= Moncalieri railway station =

Railway station in Italy

Moncalieri
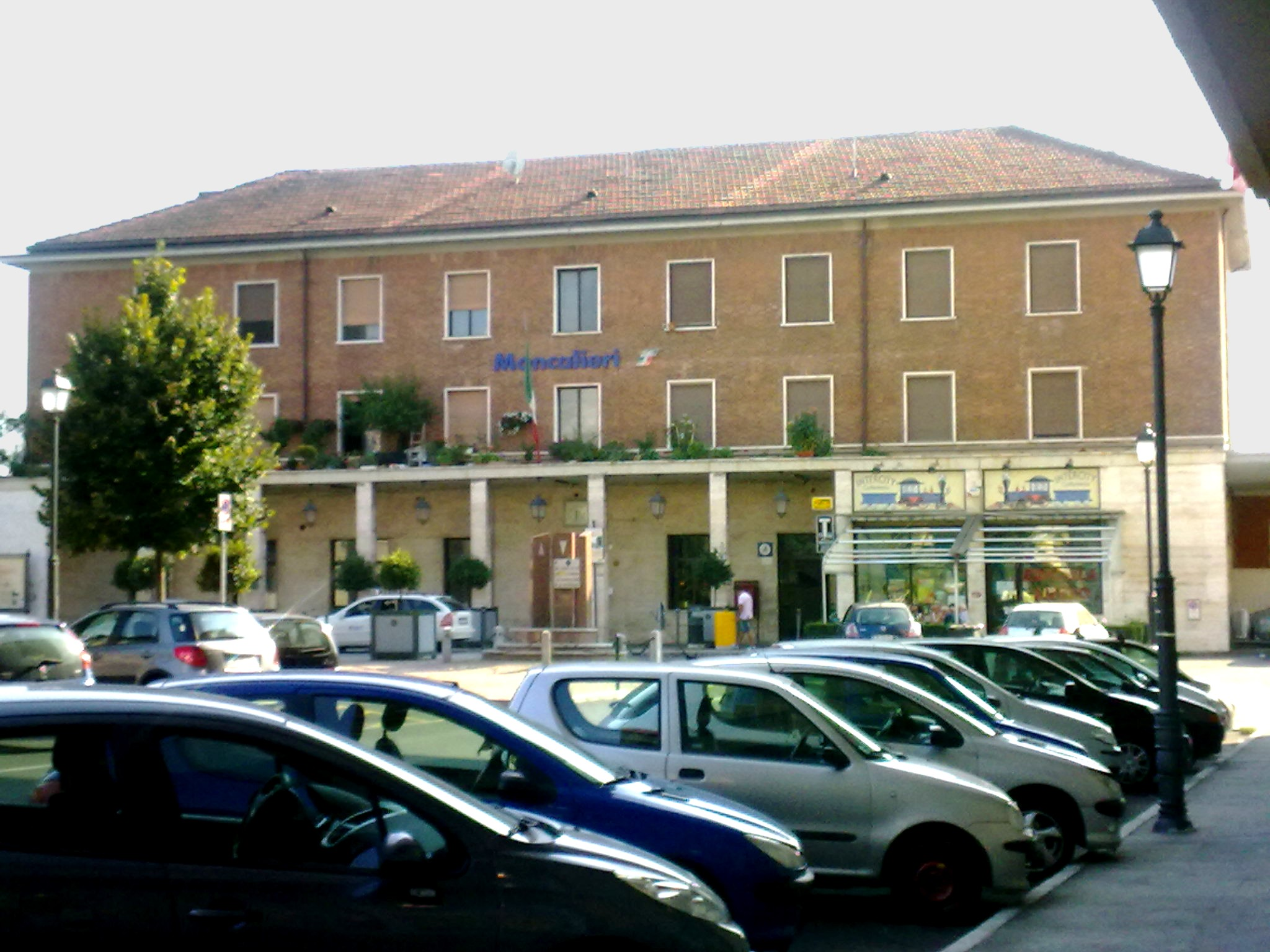

General information
- Location: Viale Stazione 7, Moncalieri; Moncalieri, Metropolitan City of Turin, Piedmont; Italy
- Coordinates: 44°59′54″N 07°40′42″E
- Owner: Rete Ferroviaria Italiana
- Operator: Rete Ferroviaria Italiana
- Lines: Turin – Genoa; Turin – Savona
- Platforms: 7
- Train operators: Trenitalia
- Connections: GTT local buses

Other information
- Classification: Silver

History
- Opened: 1848
- Closed: N/A
Location
- Location within Piedmont Location within Northern Italy Location within Italy

Moncalieri railway station (Italian: Stazione di Moncalieri) serves the town and comune of Moncalieri, in the Piedmont region of northwestern Italy.

The station became operational on 24 September 1848.

== Services ==
Preceding station	Turin SFM	Following station
Torino Lingotto towards Pont Canavese	SFM1	Trofarello towards Chieri
Torino Lingotto towards Cirié	SFM4	Trofarello towards Bra
Torino Lingotto towards Torino Aeroporto	SFM6	Trofarello towards Asti
Torino Lingotto towards Cirié	SFM7	Trofarello towards Fossano
