= Rigola Stadio railway station =

Railway station in Italy

Rigola Stadio
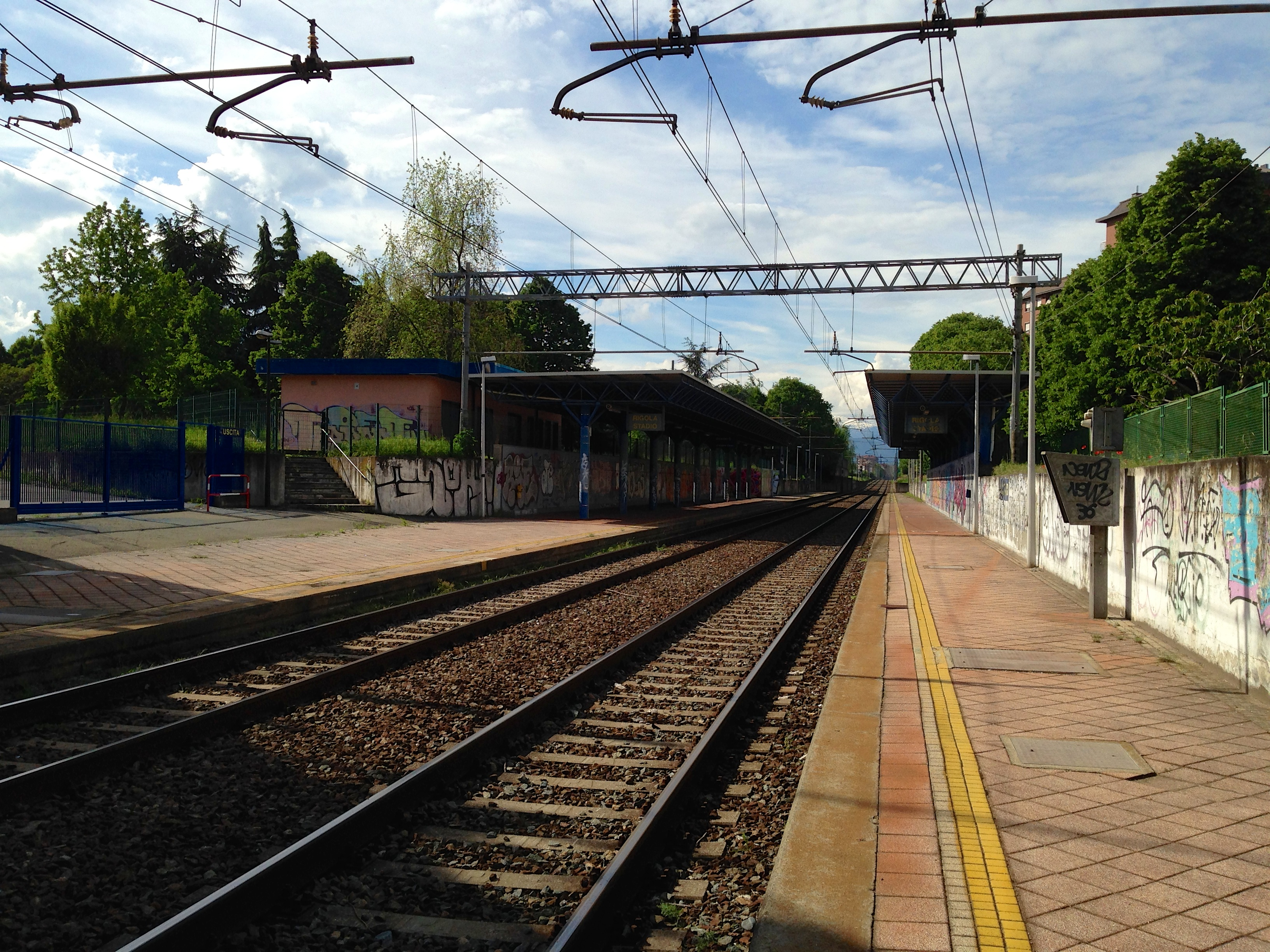

General information
- Other names: Venaria Reale Rigola Stadio
- Location: Venaria Reale; Italy
- Coordinates: 45°7′4″N 7°38′53″E
- Owner: Rete Ferroviaria Italiana
- Line: Turin–Ceres railway
- Tracks: 2
- Train operators: Trenitalia

History
- Opened: 1991

Services
Turin Metropolitan Railway Service
Location
- Location within Turin Location within Piedmont Location within Northern Italy Location within Italy

Rigola Stadio, also known as Venaria Reale Rigola Stadio, is a railway station in Venaria Reale, Italy, located near the border with the city of Turin. It is part of the Turin–Ceres railway.

It is situated near the Juventus Stadium and other amenities of the Juventus FC, such as its training center and the J-Museum. It is served by the Turin Metropolitan Railway Service.

== History ==
The station was built for the 1990 FIFA World Cup adjacent to the Delle Alpi stadium, one of the venues of the tournament. It was renovated for the 2014 UEFA Europa League final, which was played at the Juventus Stadium.

Previously operated by Gruppo Torinese Trasporti, since 2024 it is operated by Rete Ferroviaria Italiana.

== See also ==
- Juventus Stadium
- Turin Metropolitan Railway Service
- List of railway stations in Piedmont

Preceding station	Turin SFM	Following station
Venaria Reale towards Cirié	SFM4	Torino Grosseto towards Bra
Venaria Reale towards Torino Aeroporto	SFM6	Torino Grosseto towards Asti
Venaria Reale towards Cirié	SFM7	Torino Grosseto towards Fossano
