= Turin Passante railway line =

Urban railway line in Turin, Italy

The Turin railway bypass or Turin Passante railway line is a state-owned Italian railway line that runs through a tunnel in the city of Turin. It is operated by Rete Ferroviaria Italiana (RFI), which distinguishes it from the Turin-Milan "historic line," which runs through the city on a similar but surface route by calling the Turin railway bypass the passante. The Turin-Milan "historic line" was later replaced by the passante itself in the section between Turin's Stura and Lingotto stations. The passante is an integral part of the Turin metropolitan railway service and the Piedmont regional railway service.

== History ==
Originally, the railway lines converging on Turin were all built at ground level. In 1905, the City of Turin made a request to lower the tracks such that they would no longer interfere with foot, horse, and automotive traffic.

The lines impacted by the project were:

- the Turin-Genoa line, from Corso Germano Sommeiller to Turin Smistamento
- the Turin-Milan line, from Quadrivio Zappata to Corso Vittorio Emanuele II
- the Turin-Bardonecchia line, from Turin Smistamento to the "Bivio La Grangia" on Corso Fratelli Rosselli

Bivio La Grangia and Quadrivio Zappata took their names from two historic farmhouses located in their vicinity. Although the name "La Grangia" was prominently noted on the building of the control room, it was later demolished and incorporated into the Turin San Paolo station. This change was done to reduce confusion caused by the similarity with the name of the Turin mathematician Joseph-Louis Lagrange, to whom a street near Piazza Carlo Felice is dedicated. The hypothesis that it was an Italianization of the fascist period is denied by the fact that the wording "Bivio Lagrangia" already appeared in the service timetable of the Turin-Bardonecchia of 1906.

The location of the aforementioned farmhouses is reported respectively in sections 106 and 108 of the Commercial and Administrative Guide of Turin (Italian: Guida Commerciale e Amministrativa di Torino) of 1924–1925, published by G.B. Paravia & C. in June 1924, in addition to the Porta Nuova station exit to the "Quadrivio Zappata."

The works began in 1911, but were suspended during the First World War, resuming in 1923. In addition to the railway works, such as the laying of all the double track sections, a trench four kilometers long and seven meters deep was dug, two railway overpasses were built, on Corso Dante and Corso Bramante, and the railway overpass on Corso Sommeiller was rebuilt. The opening took place in 1928. The Italian State Railways (FS) also planned to lower the track height of the Porta Susa station and the track that connected it to the Turin Dora station, but the former was not done, so as to maintain freight service. The latter was not done either due to the level crossing of Corso Regina Margherita. Instead, the municipality of Turin planned to eliminate the level crossing by building an underpass, so the section between Corso Regina Margherita and the city border remained visible and without crossings: on an elevated road on Corso Principe Oddone, in a trench along almost the whole of Corso Venezia and at ground level in the area of Via Breglio. The elevated road on Corso Mortara was also built in the years 1968–1969, but this was demolished between 2005 and 2011 together with Dora station. The same fate also befell the elevated road at the beginning of Via Duchessa Jolanda – demolished to bury the tracks.

In 1979, the Piedmont Region drew up a Transport Plan which defined the Turin hub as a priority: the first work was carried out on the section from the renovated Turin Lingotto station to Trofarello with the quadrupling of the tracks. From 1984 onwards, people began to talk about the Passante, meaning a new double-track line between Turin Lingotto station and Porta Susa station. In 1987, with the construction of the new viaduct over the Stura di Lanzo river, construction work began on the quadrupling and burying of the northern section.

On 27 September 2009, the first underground track was opened between the new Turin Porta Susa station and the Turin Stura station. On 18 October, the second underground track was opened and consequently the surface track, including the Turin Dora station and the old Porta Susa station, was decommissioned.

The railway link was opened to passengers on 2 December 2012, and was built thanks to an investment of 1.4 billion euros.

On 16 June 2015, the remaining work on the surface section started, with the permitting of the construction of railway tunnels, a vehicle underpass in Piazza Statuto, the new viaduct over the Dora Riparia, new road connections and various cycle paths, which wind along the Spina Centrale and concern this section, for a total cost estimated at 25 million euros. The works were completed in June 2016. In 2018–2020, work was done on the surface arrangement of Corso Venezia, with cycle paths and protected pedestrian routes.

=== Connection project with the Turin-Ceres line ===
With the burial of the tracks, the Turin-Ceres railway, which connected to the Turin-Milan line at the Torino Dora station, was isolated from the rail network due to the difference in elevation. This was due to the excessive depth of the railway line in that section, caused by its passage under the Dora Riparia river and the Corso Regina Margherita underpass. Having rejected the idea of reconnecting the Turin-Ceres railway to the Turin-Milan line at the Torino Dora station, a connection further north was considered, under the Corso Grosseto line, with the connection taking place at the Torino Rebaudengo Fossata station. This project was approved by the city council in 2007, with the demolition of the Corso Potenza overpass to excavate the tunnel.

The plan calls for a track rerouting, starting from Via Badini Confalonieri. Instead of continuing through a tunnel towards the Madonna di Campagna station, the track will curve east to join Corso Grosseto, where the new Turin Grosseto station will be built at Via Lulli. The route continues east until it connects to the bypass at the Turin Rebaudengo Fossata station. The project requires the demolition of the Corso Potenza overpass, which will be replaced with an underpass.

Work began in September 2017, in staged so as not to disconnect the underlying tracks for the GTT depot in Venaria for trams and buses.

Commercial service on the new infrastructure began on 20 January 2024.

=== Ban on diesel trains ===
On 24 October 2009, the fire prevention system of the new Porta Susa underground station, installed about a month earlier, activated itself due to fumes released by a diesel train coming from Aosta, causing the elevators to block and the release of "water blades" in the entrance gates of the station. After this, an analysis of safety systems and emergency procedures active in the passante was conducted, from which concerns for the health of users related to the emissions of diesel trains also emerged. As a result, in agreement with passenger associations and environmental groups, a ban was placed on the transit of diesel trains on the railway link starting on 12 December 2010. Consequently, from that date the direct connections between Turin and Aosta were abolished, which could only be carried out with diesel-powered trains, as the railway from Ivrea to Aosta is not electrified. They were reinstated in 2019 thanks to the new BTR 813, a bimodal train equipped with electric motors that can be powered either by an overhead contact line or by its own diesel generators.

== Path ==
The urban section of the bypass crosses the railway area from the Turin Lingotto station to the Turin Stura station extending for almost 13 km, in addition to the connecting branch with the Turin Porta Nuova station. About 8 km of the route is underground, inside the "Ovest Quadruplicamento" tunnel, 4,448 meters long, and the "Passante" tunnel, 3,635 meters long. The metropolitan section of the bypass extends respectively to the north up to the Settimo Torinese station and to the south up to the Trofarello station.

The route replaces the Turin-Milan railway (Historic Line) between Turin Stura and continues to Turin Lingotto on an independent route. Within the Turin municipal area, the bypass passes through the districts of Falchera, Rebaudengo, Borgata Vittoria, San Donato, Aurora, Crocetta, Lingotto and Mirafiori Sud.
