= List of railway stations in Turin =

Turin is an important railway hub, with national and international connections. As of 2024 it has six railway stations for passenger service, served by trains from different operators: Trenitalia, Italo-Nuovo Trasporto Viaggiatori, and SNCF.

The hub's main infrastructure is the Turin railway link, which in the 2010s underwent expansion and renovation, allowing for the creation of the Turin Metropolitan Railway Service, which entered service in 2012. The project also included the construction of new urban stops and the renovation of others.

== International/High-Speed and National Transport ==
• The Torino Porta Nuova railway station (20 platforms): classified platinum by the RFI, is the primary station of the Turin hub, from which trains on the Turin-Milan railway, Turin-Genoa railway, Turin-Fossano-Savona railway, and the Turin-Modane railway depart. It is the Italian train station which serves the third highest number of passengers. All service categories of Trenitalia trains can be found at the station, ensuring fast connections to all of Italy. It is a transfer station for urban bus lines, the local tram network, and the metro.

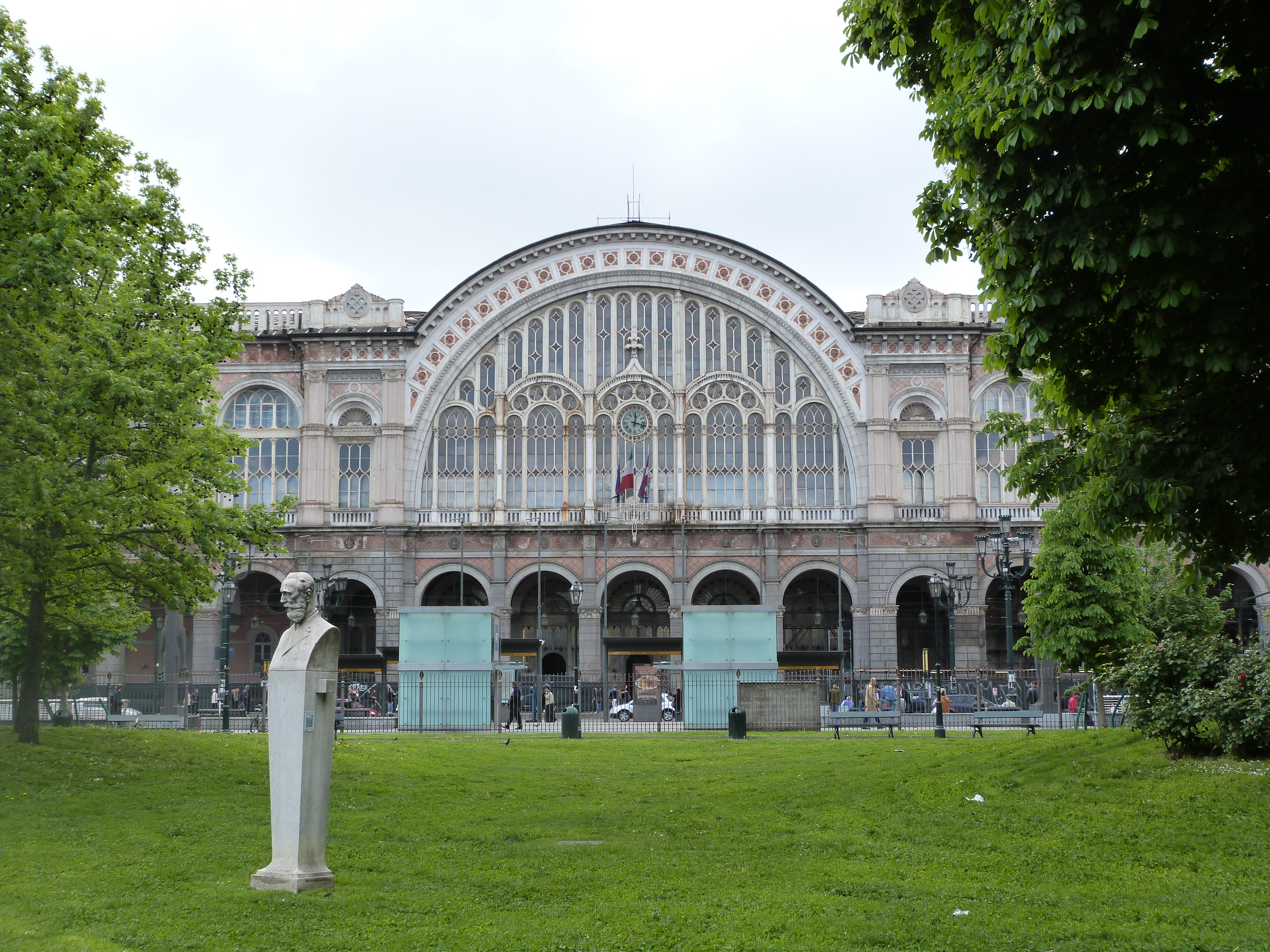
Torina Porta Nuova Train Station

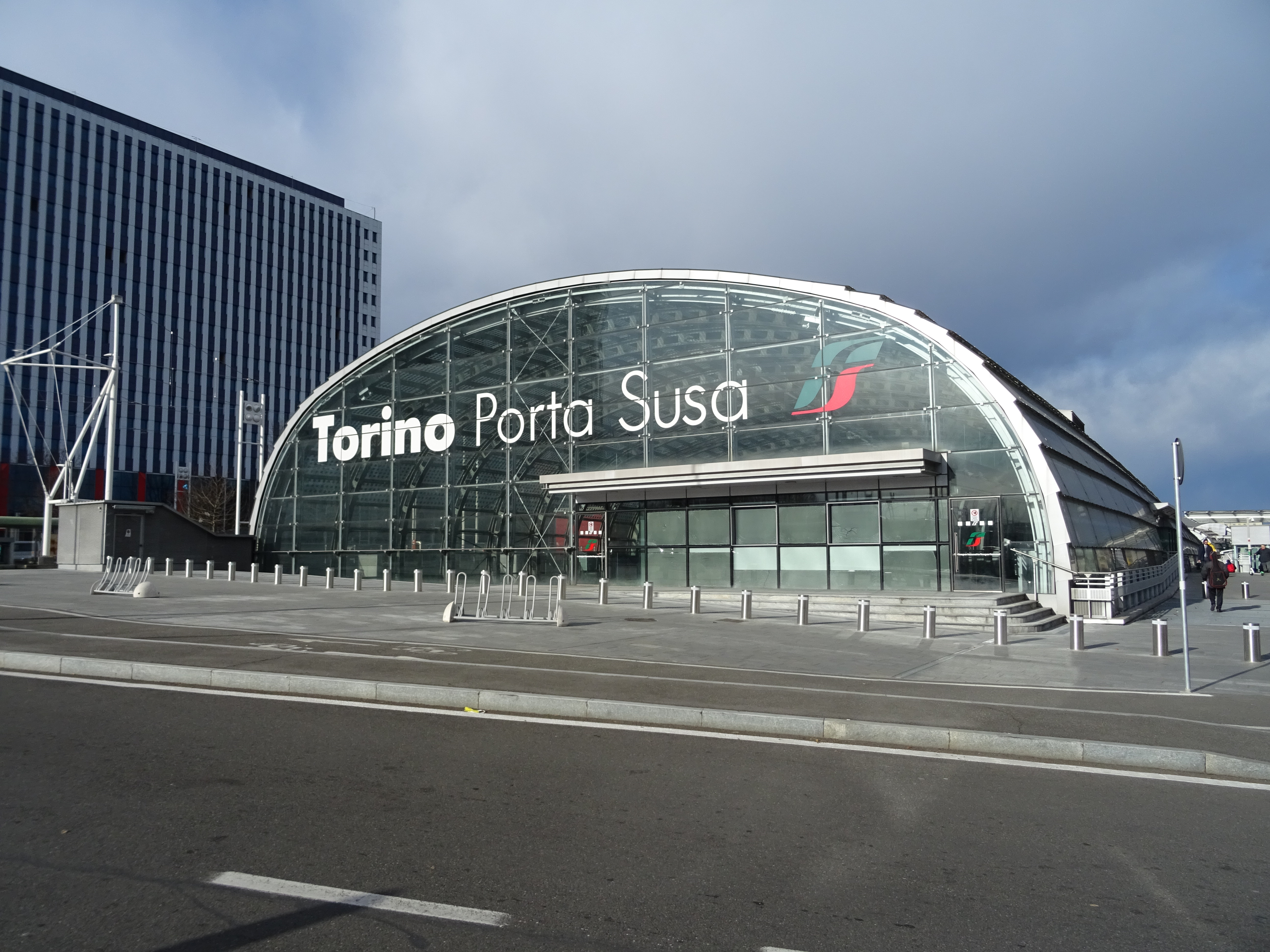
New Torino Porta Susa Station Entrance

• The Torino Porta Susa railway station (6 platforms): classified gold by RFI, is the second largest station in Turin.

In 2008 its underground section was opened to replace the above-ground old Turin Porta Susa station, from which train lines were gradually transferred to the new underground area. It is located halfway along the Turin rail link and is gaining significant importance in Turin's rail transport landscape thanks to the launch of the High-Speed Train and the Turin Metropolitan Railway Service. The new above-ground building, a glass structure shaped like a horizontal semi-cylinder, has been completed. Local and regional trains stop at the station, in addition to national services on the Turin-Milan railway. Porta Susa Underground was opened to the public on December 14, 2008, and provides interchanges with various lines of the urban bus network, trams, and subway.

== Regional, local, and metropolitan transportation ==
=== Stations in use ===
• Turin Lingotto station (13 platforms): classified as gold by RFI, it is a non-terminal station, and the third most used in Turin. Local and regional trains going to Turin Porta Nuova and Porta Susa, SFM1, SFM2, SFM4, SFM6, and SFM7 stop here. Regional services for Liguria passing through the Turin–Genoa railway and the Turin-Fossano-Savona railway also use the station. One can also transfer to various local busses.

• Torino Stura station (9 platforms): This is Turin's northernmost station. It is the gateway to Turin from the north and the terminus of the SFM6 line to Asti. It is a transfer station with various urban and suburban bus lines and with tram 4 (underground stop).

• Turin Rebaudengo Fossata station (5 platforms): This underground station has been open since December 9, 2012, and is located in the Rebaudengo neighborhood. The station is only serviced by metropolitan rail and is a transfer station for several urban bus lines.

• Turin Grosseto station (2 platforms): This is an underground stop on the Turin–Ceres railway. Only metropolitan trains stop here.

=== Planned stations or stations under construction ===
• Turin Zappata Station: this will be an underground stop on the Passante railway line, currently under construction beneath Clessidra, the area enclosed by the Zappata crossroads, where the Passante railway line, the Turin–Bardonecchia railway, and the direct line to Turin Porta Nuova meet. The area is already served by several lines of the urban surface bus and tram network, with a metro stop currently being planned.

• Turin San Paolo station, located in the Turin neighborhood of the same name. It is currently used only for sorting goods bound for the Orbassano freight yard, but there are plans to transform it into a stop for metropolitan rail lines. It is located on the Turin-Bardonecchia railway line, where the Orbassano junction and the Crocetta junction depart, allowing trains to route through this station, avoiding the need to switch at Porta Nuova.

== Abandoned stations ==
• Turin Porta Nuova Pier: this is the old Porta Nuova station, built for temporary use out of wood in 1848 before the construction of the modern Porta Nuova station.

• Turin Porta Susa: the old Porta Susa station, which opened for services in 1856 and was replaced by the modern underground Porta Susa station on October 18, 2009, but traffic had already gradually decreased since 1987 with the construction of the rail hub.

• Turin Vanchigilia: a former freight yard in the Vanchiglia area, decommissioned in 1990 following the closure of nearby industrial plants, causing a rework of Turin's railway system with the expansion of the Turin Orbassano intermodal terminal. It is now disconnected from the network due to the construction of the railway bypass.

• Turin Porta Milano: also known as "Ponte Mosca station" due to its proximity to the bridge of the same name over the Dora Riparia river, and colloquially "Cirié-Lanzo station", it was the terminus of the Turin-Ceres railway from 1869, the year of its opening, until 1987, when the terminus was moved back to the GTT Turin Dora station for the construction of the railway link.

• Turin Dora: opened in 1902. It was decommissioned after the opening of the railway link, with the passenger building demolished on March 18, 2011. It served as a regional and local rail stop.

• Turin Dora GTT: this station has been the terminus of the Turin-Ceres railway since 1990. It was closed on August 25, 2020, due to work on the new route, which will reconnect to the Turin-Milan line at the Rebaudengo-Fossata stop.

• Turin Smistamento: freight yard closed in 1985.

• Turin Valdocco: freight yard near the Turin Dora station, also known as Scalo Dora. Built before Turin Vanchiglia, it was in service from 1905 until its demolition in 2010.

• Turin Vallino: old freight yard located in Piazza Nizza, undergoing urban regeneration work.

• Maddona di Campagna station: old underground station on the Turin-Ceres line that replaced the original surface station demolished to make room for the underground section in 1990. Like the Turin Dora GTT, it was closed on August 25, 2020, for construction to reconnect to the Turin-Milan line. In 2024, it was replaced by the new Turin Grosseto station.

== Locomotive depots ==
• Turin Porta Nuova locomotive depot (decommissioned)

• Turin Locomotive Depot Smistamento (in use)

== Chronological list of stations ==
Name	Inauguration	Current state	Type	Manager
San Paolo	Unknown	In use	Goods yard	RFI
Dora (RFI) (1)	1858	Demolished	Through station, surface	RFI
Porta Nuova	1861	In use	Terminal station, surface	RFI/Grandi Stazioni
Stura	1868	In use	Through station, surface	RFI
Porta Susa (1)	1868	Dismissed	Through station, surface	N/A
Porta Milano	1868	Dismissed	Through station, surface	N/A
Lingotto	1984	In use	Through station, surface	RFI
Dora (GTT)	1988	In use	Terminal station, surface	GTT
Madonna di Campagna	1990	In use	Through station, surface	GTT
Porta Susa (2)	2008	In use	Through station, underground	RFI
Rebaudengo Fossata	2009	In use	Through station, underground	RFI
Dora (RFI) 2	TBD	Under construction	Through station, underground	RFI
Zappata	TBD	Under construction	Through station, underground	RFI
