= Torino Rebaudengo Fossata railway station =

Railway station in Italy

Coordinates: 45.0995°N 7.6863°E

Torino Rebaudengo Fossata

General information
- Location: Corso Venezia, Turin; Turin, Metropolitan City of Turin, Piedmont; Italy
- Owner: Rete Ferroviaria Italiana
- Operator: Rete Ferroviaria Italiana
- Line: Turin Passante
- Platforms: 5
- Train operators: Trenitalia
- Connections: GTT local buses

History
- Opened: 2009
Location
- Location within Turin Location within Piedmont Location within Northern Italy Location within Italy

Torino Rebaudengo Fossata railway station (Italian: Stazione di Torino Rebaudengo Fossata) serves the city and comune of Turin in the Piedmont region, northwestern Italy. The station is located at the intersection among Corso Venezia, Via Fossata and Via Lauro Rossi.

== Services ==
Preceding station	Turin SFM	Following station
Torino Stura towards Pont Canavese	SFM1	Torino Porta Susa towards Chieri
Torino Stura towards Chivasso	SFM2	Torino Porta Susa towards Pinerolo
Torino Stura towards Cirié	SFM4	Torino Porta Susa towards Bra
Torino Stura towards Cirié	SFM7	Torino Porta Susa towards Fossano
