= Torino Porta Susa railway station =

Railway station in Turin, Italy

Torino Porta Susa
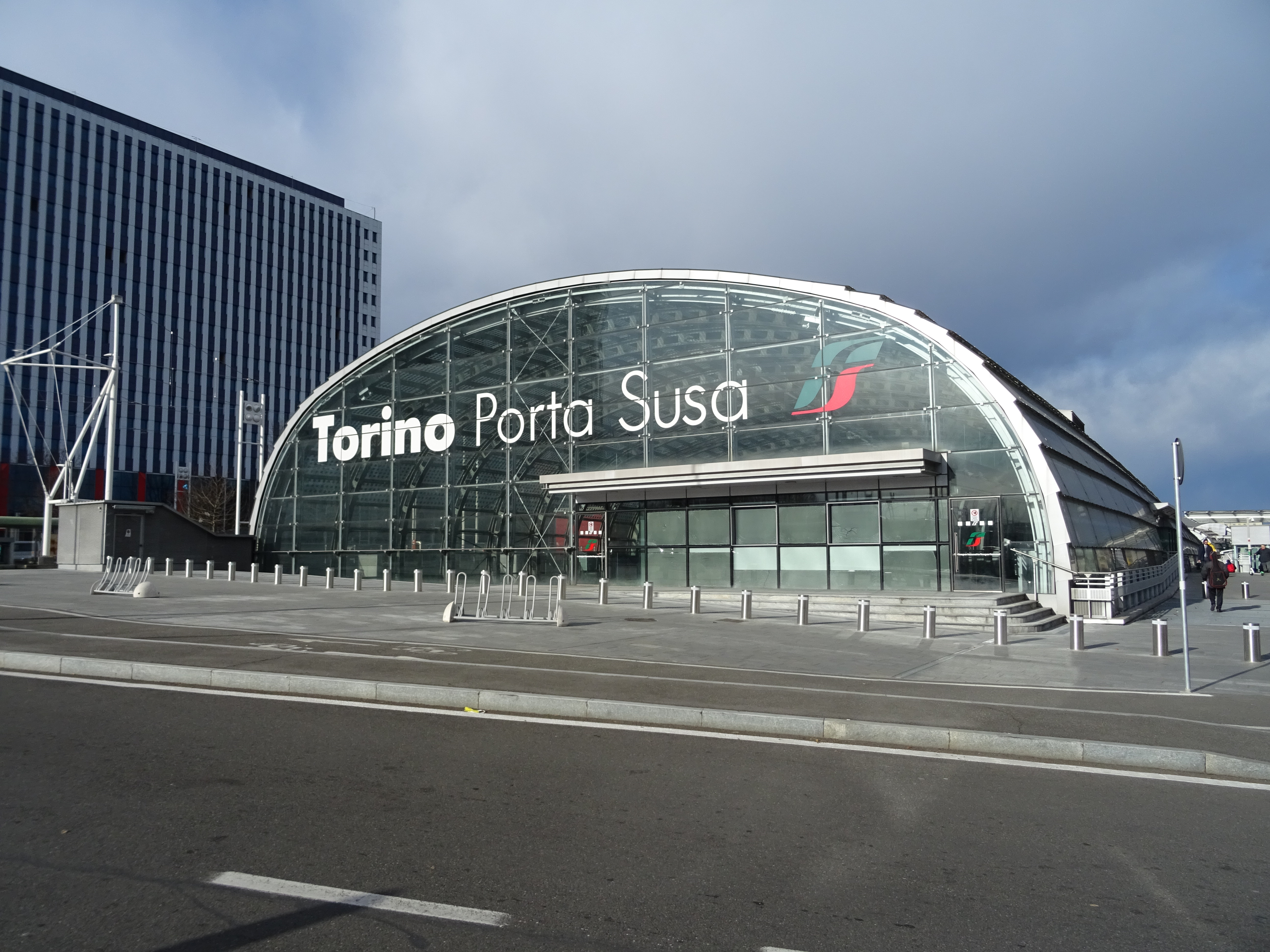
- Turin Porta Susa railway station

General information
- Location: Piazza XVIII Dicembre, Turin, Metropolitan City of Turin, Piedmont; Italy
- Coordinates: 45°04′21″N 07°39′57″E
- Owner: Rete Ferroviaria Italiana
- Operator: Rete Ferroviaria Italiana
- Platforms: 6

Construction
- Structure type: Underground

Other information
- IATA code: ITT

History
- Opened: 1868; 158 years ago
Services
Preceding station	Trenitalia	Following station
Oulx–Cesana–Claviere–Sestriere towards Paris-Lyon	Frecciarossa	Milano Centrale Terminus
Preceding station	SNCF	Following station
Oulx-Cesana-Claviere-Sestriere towards Paris-Lyon	TGV inOui	Novara towards Milan
Preceding station		Following station
Torino Porta Nuova Terminus	Torino–Salerno	Milano Centrale towards Salerno
Preceding station	Turin SFM	Following station
Torino Rebaudengo Fossata towards Pont Canavese	SFM1	Torino Lingotto towards Chieri
Torino Rebaudengo Fossata towards Chivasso	SFM2	Torino Lingotto towards Pinerolo
Torino Rebaudengo Fossata towards Cirié	SFM4	Torino Lingotto towards Bra
Torino Rebaudengo Fossata towards Torino Aeroporto	SFM6	Torino Lingotto towards Asti
Torino Rebaudengo Fossata towards Cirié	SFM7	Torino Lingotto towards Fossano
Location
- Location within Turin Location within Piedmont Location within Northern Italy Location within Italy

Torino Porta Susa (IATA: ITT) is a railway station in Turin, northern Italy; it is the second busiest mainline station in the city, after Torino Porta Nuova. It is located in Corso Inghilterra.

== History ==
The station was built in 1868 during the expansion of the city towards the west. Trains between Torino Porta Nuova and Milan stop at the station, including TGV services between Paris and Milan and other services using the Turin–Milan high-speed line.

== Reconstruction ==
In April 2006, reconstruction of the station began in conjunction with the Turin Passante regional railway. This involved quadrupling of the number of tracks that run through central Turin. At Porta Susa station, the line was widened to six tracks with new platforms being built beneath the thoroughfare Corso Inghilterra. A 300-metre long, 19-metre high glass and steel structure has been built above the tracks to create a new station, which is intended to become Turin's main hub of urban, regional and international rail traffic.

The project was developed by the Paris-based studio, Silvio d'Ascia Architecture, in collaboration with AREP and Agostino Magnaghi, after the team had won an international competition. The station was inaugurated on 14 January 2013 by Prime Minister Mario Monti. The total cost – estimated at €65 million – was borne entirely by the rail network operator, Rete Ferroviaria Italiana (RFI). Plans for the reconstruction project also included a 100-metre high office tower for the Italian State Railways, Ferrovie dello Stato.

The Turin Metro opened a metro station at Porta Susa, which provides additional connections with Porta Nuova and Lingotto.

== Train services ==
The station is served by the following services:

- High speed services (TGV)
  - Paris – Lyon – Chambéry – Turin – Milan
- High speed services (Frecciarossa)
  - Paris – Lyon – Chambéry – Turin – Milan
  - Turin – Milan – Bologna – Florence – Rome
  - Turin – Milan – Bologna – Reggio Emilia – Florence – Rome – Naples – Salerno
- High speed services (Italo)
  - Turin – Milan – Bologna – Reggio Emilia – Florence – Rome – Naples – Salerno
- High speed services (Frecciabianca)
  - Turin – Milan – Brescia – Verona – Vicenza – Padua – Venice – Trieste
- Night train (Intercity Notte)
  - Turin – Milan – Parma – Rome – Naples – Salerno
  - Turin – Milan – Parma – Reggio Emilia – Florence – Rome – Salerno – Lamezia Terme – Reggio di Calabria
- Express services (Regionale Veloce)
  - Turin – Chivasso – Santhià – Vercelli – Novara – Milan
  - Turin - Chivasso – Ivrea – Aosta
- Regional services (Treno regionale)
  - Turin – Chivasso – Santhià – Biella
  - Turin – Asti – Alessandria – Ronco – Genoa
- Turin Metropolitan services
  - (SFM1) Rivarolo – Turin – Chieri
  - (SFM2) Pinerolo – Turin – Chivasso
  - (SFM4) Turin – Alba
  - (SFM6) Turin – Asti
  - (SFM7) Fossano – Turin

== Metro services ==
Turin Metro service M1 serves the nearby Porta Susa metro station.

- M1: Fermi - Porta Susa - Porta Nuova - Lingotto

== See also ==
- Turin Metro
- Turin metropolitan railway service
- Torino Porta Nuova railway station
