= Torino Lingotto railway station =

Railway station in Turin, Italy

Torino Lingotto
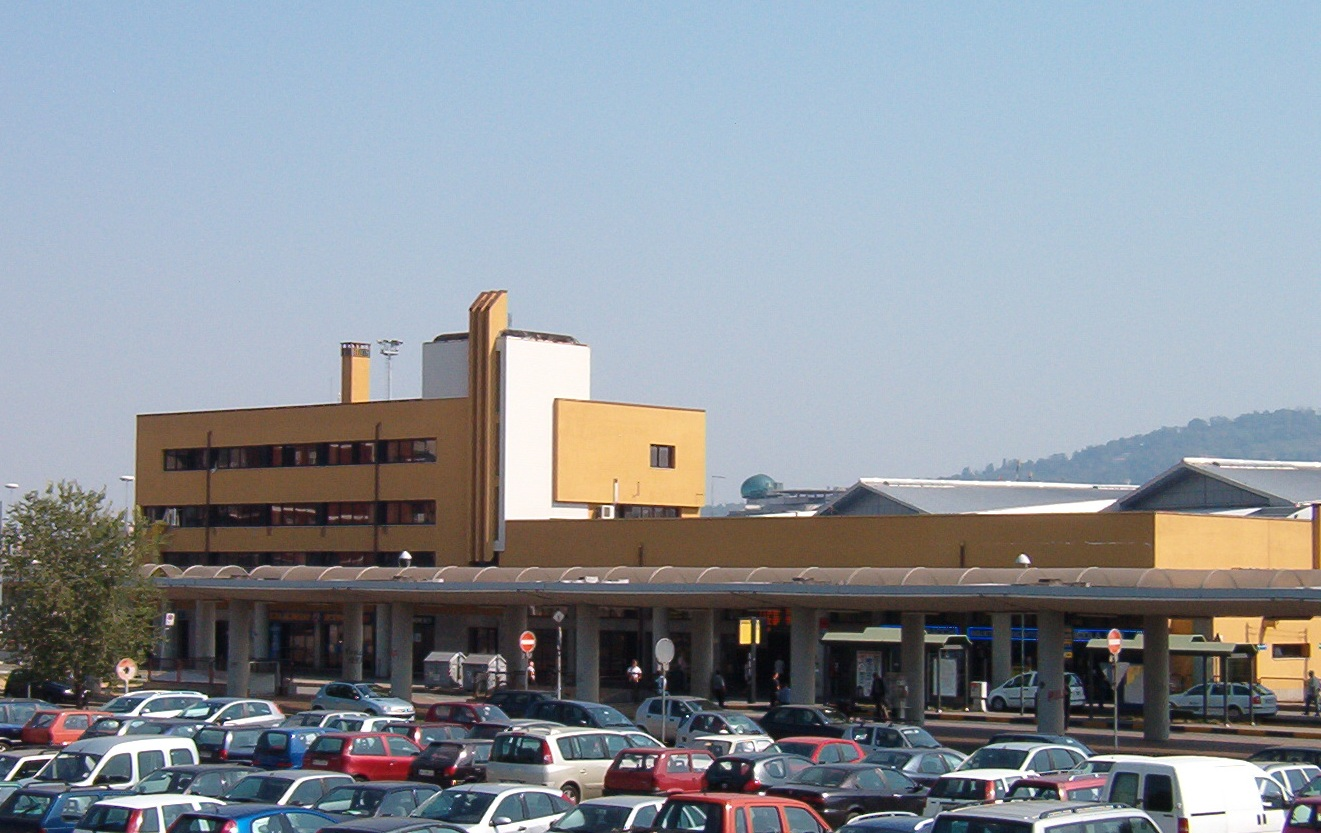
- The passenger building.

General information
- Location: Via Mario Pannunzio; 10127 Torino TO; Turin, Metropolitan City of Turin, Piedmont; Italy
- Coordinates: 45°01′36″N 07°39′25″E
- Operator: Rete Ferroviaria Italiana
- Lines: Turin–Genoa; Turin–Pinerolo; Turin–Cuneo; Turin–Savona
- Distance: 4.318 km (2.683 mi) from Torino Porta Nuova
- Train operators: Trenitalia; GTT; Arenaways
- Connections: Urban bus lines 14, 41, 63, 63/, 74

Other information
- Classification: Gold

History
- Opened: 1960; 66 years ago
Location
- Location within Turin Location within Piedmont Location within Northern Italy Location within Italy

Torino Lingotto railway station is one of the main stations serving the city and comune of Turin, capital of the region of Piedmont, northwestern Italy. The Torino Lingotto metro station is located nearby, and opened on March 6, 2011.

Opened in 1960, the station is the third most important in Turin, after Torino Porta Nuova and Torino Porta Susa. It forms part of the Turin–Genoa main line, and is also a stop on three secondary railways, which link Turin with Pinerolo, Cuneo and Savona, respectively.

The station is managed by Rete Ferroviaria Italiana (RFI). Most train services are operated by Trenitalia. Each of these companies is a subsidiary of Ferrovie dello Stato (FS), Italy's state-owned rail company. The remaining train services are operated by GTT, a public benefit corporation responsible for public transportation in the provinces of Turin, Alessandria, Cuneo and Asti, and Arenaways, an open-access railway operator that began passenger operations in November 2010.

== Location ==
Torino Lingotto railway station is situated in Via Mario Pannunzio, in the district of Lingotto, to the south east of Turin's city centre. It is near the well known former FIAT car factory also named Lingotto, and the Arco olimpico, symbol of the 2006 Winter Olympics. It is connected through a pedestrian tunnel to the Oval Lingotto, the Piedmont Region Headquarters, and the station Italia '61 of the Turin Metro line.

== History ==
The station was founded in 1960 as a railway stop without a passenger building. The facility was later transformed into a station equipped with a building suitable for accommodating both departing and arriving passengers.

With the increase in the number of trains passing through daily (from 240 to 270 in just a few years), it was decided in 1970 to extend the double-track section from Lingotto to Trofarello railway station, on the Turin-Genoa railway.

The 1960 passenger building was demolished in 1980 to make way for the current passenger building, which was opened in 1984.

== Facilities ==
The station has eleven through tracks and seven platform tracks, divided into two groups: northern section (four tracks) and southern section (three tracks).

The building can be reached through the station Italia '61 of the Turin Metro line within a 5-minute walking distance. Lingotto is another important station nearby.

== Future ==
The station is the subject of local government studies, given its growing importance to the southern part of the city.

The assumed reduction in future capacity of Torino Porta Nuova may further increase the station's importance. Local governments are working on the possible integration and synergy with the former Lingotto factory complex.

On 20 November 2007, the architect Massimiliano Fuksas submitted a preliminary project commissioned by the Piedmont Region for the redevelopment of the Via Nizza area, which previously housed the now demolished factories of Fiat Aviazione. The subsequently approved plan included construction of the new Piedmont Region Headquarters.

The area between the station, the Piedmont Region Headquarters and the Oval Lingotto will be redeveloped with the project of the new "Parco della Salute" a complex dedicated to health, research, innovation and science.

== Services ==
The station is served by the following services:

- High speed services (Frecciabianca) Turin - Allesandria - Genova - La Spezia - Pisa - Livorno - Rome
- Intercity services Turin – Asti – Alessandria – Genoa - La Spezia - Pisa - Livorno - Rome - Naples - Salerno
- Intercity services Turin – Asti – Alessandria – Bologna – Rimini – Ancona – Pescara – Foggia – Bari – Brindisi – Lecce
- Night train (Intercity Notte) Turin - Alessandria - Bolgona - Ancona - Pescara - Foggia - Bari - Brindisi - Lecce
- Night train (Intercity Notte) Turin - Genoa - La Spezia - Pisa - Livorno - Rome - Naples - Salerno
- Regional services (Treno regionale) Turin – Asti – Alessandria – Ronco – Genoa
- Regional services (Treno regionale) Turin - Chivasso - Santhià - Biella
- Turin Metropolitan services (SFM3) Bardonecchia - Bussoleno - Turin
- Turin Metropolitan services (SFM3) Susa - Bussoleno - Turin
- Turin Metropolitan services (SFM1) Rivarolo - Turin - Chieri
- Turin Metropolitan services (SFM2) Pinerolo - Turin - Chivasso
- Turin Metropolitan services (SFM4) Turin - Alba
- Turin Metropolitan services (SFM6) Turin - Asti
- Turin Metropolitan services (SFM7) Fossano - Turin

Preceding station	Turin SFM	Following station
Torino Porta Susa towards Pont Canavese	SFM1	Moncalieri towards Chieri
Torino Porta Susa towards Chivasso	SFM2	Moncalieri towards Pinerolo
Torino Porta Susa towards Cirié	SFM4	Moncalieri towards Bra
Torino Porta Susa towards Cirié	SFM7	Moncalieri towards Fossano

== Interchange and connections ==
The station offers interchange with urban bus lines 14, 41, 63, 63/ and 74. It also offers a connection to the Lingotto metro station.

== See also ==
- List of railway stations in Turin
- History of rail transport in Italy
- Rail transport in Italy
- Railway stations in Italy
- Turin Metropolitan Railway Service
- Lingotto (Turin Metro)
