= Trofarello railway station =

Railway station in Italy

Trofarello
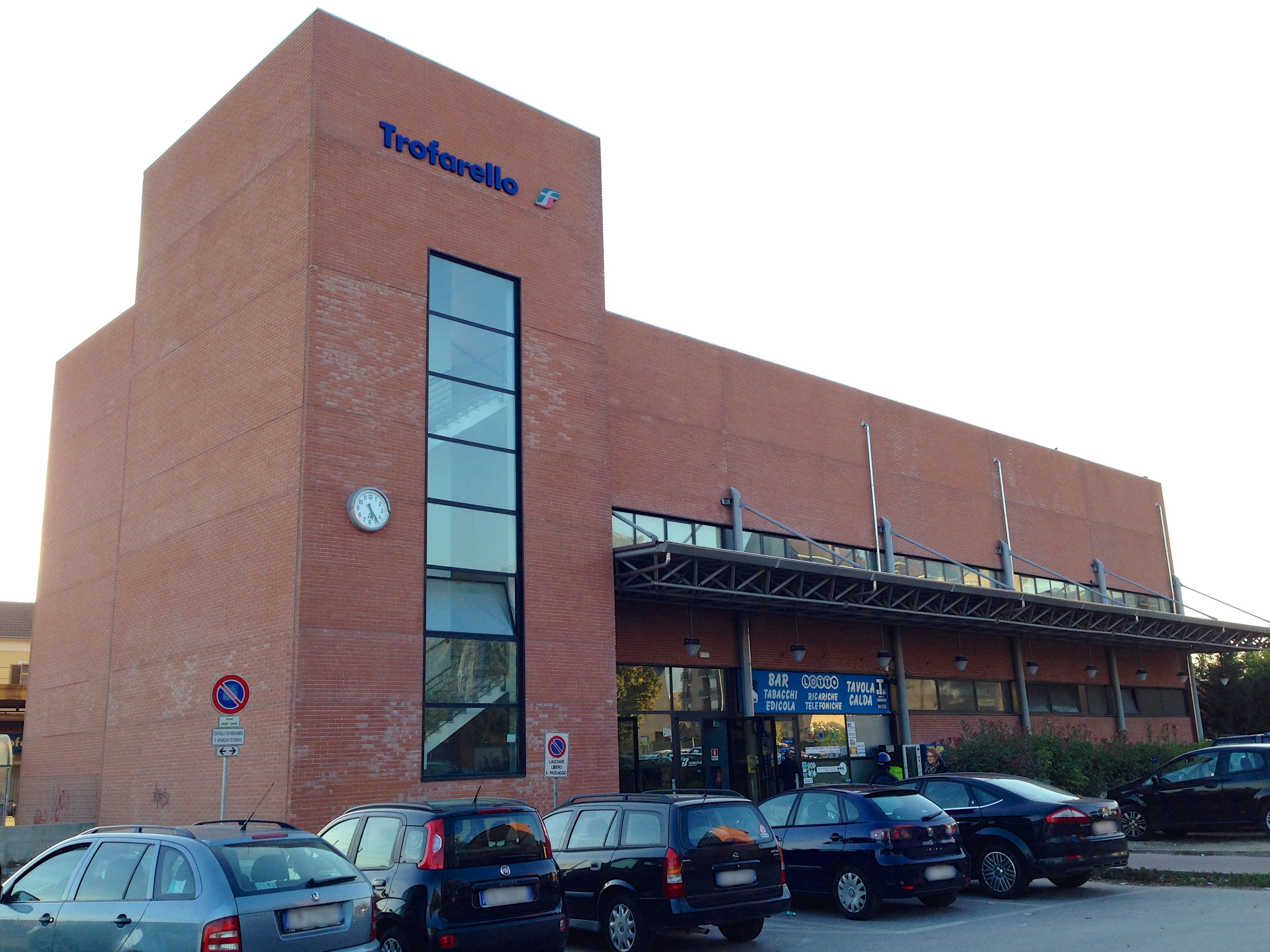

General information
- Location: Trofarello, Metropolitan City of Turin, Piedmont; Italy
- Coordinates: 44°58′49″N 07°44′07″E
- Owner: Rete Ferroviaria Italiana
- Operator: Rete Ferroviaria Italiana
- Lines: Trofarello – Chieri; Turin – Genoa; Turin – Fossano - Savona
- Train operators: Trenitalia

Other information
- Classification: Silver

History
- Opened: 1849
Location
- Location within Piedmont Location within Northern Italy Location within Italy

Trofarello railway station (Italian: Stazione di Trofarello) serves the town and comune of Trofarello, in the Piedmont region, northwestern Italy. The station is located at the end of Via Roma, near the large Piazza Europa.

== Services ==
Preceding station	Turin SFM	Following station
Moncalieri towards Pont Canavese	SFM1	Chieri Terminus
Moncalieri towards Cirié	SFM4	Villastellone towards Bra
Moncalieri towards Cirié	SFM7	Villastellone towards Fossano
