= Torino Stura railway station =

Railway station in Italy

Torino Stura
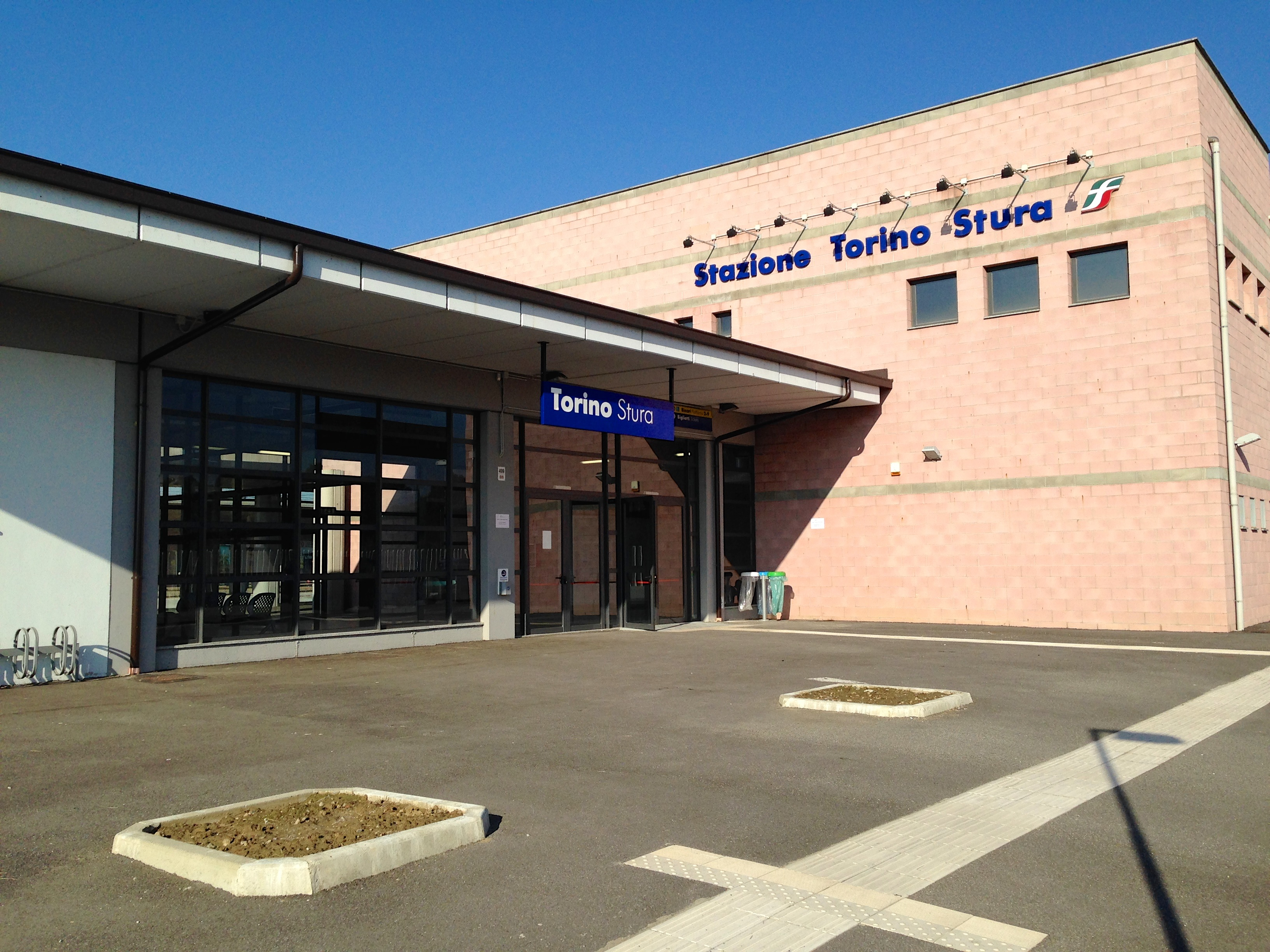

General information
- Location: Corso Romania 501, Turin; Turin, Metropolitan City of Turin, Piedmont; Italy
- Coordinates: 45°07′19″N 07°42′46″E
- Owner: Rete Ferroviaria Italiana
- Operator: Rete Ferroviaria Italiana
- Lines: Turin – Milan; Turin Passante railway
- Platforms: 9
- Train operators: Trenitalia
- Connections: Local buses
Location
- Location within Turin Location within Piedmont Location within Northern Italy Location within Italy

Torino Stura railway station (Italian: Stazione di Torino Stura) serves the town and comune of Turin, in the Piedmont region, northwestern Italy. It is located on the Corso Romania.

Since 2012 it serves lines SFM1, SFM2 and SFM4, part of the Turin metropolitan railway service.

== Services ==
| Preceding station | Turin SFM | Following station |
|---|---|---|
| Settimo towards Pont Canavese | SFM1 | Torino Rebaudengo Fossata towards Chieri |
| Settimo towards Chivasso | SFM2 | Torino Rebaudengo Fossata towards Pinerolo |
| Terminus | SFM4 | Torino Rebaudengo Fossata towards Bra |
| Terminus | SFM7 | Torino Rebaudengo Fossata towards Fossano |
