= Torino Aeroporto railway station =

Railway station serving Turin airport

Torino Aeroporto

General information
- Other names: Caselle Aeroporto
- Location: Caselle Torinese; Italy
- Coordinates: 45°11′28″N 7°38′30″E
- Owner: Rete Ferroviaria Italiana
- Line: Turin–Ceres railway
- Tracks: 4
- Train operators: Trenitalia
- Connections: Turin Airport

History
- Opened: 2001

Services
Turin Metropolitan Railway Service
Location
- Location within Piedmont Location within Northern Italy Location within Italy

Torino Aeroporto is a railway station in Caselle Torinese, a town in the metropolitan area of Turin, Italy, serving its airport.

It opened in 2001 as Caselle Aeroporto and it was initially operated by Gruppo Torinese Trasporti. Since 2024 the station is operated by Rete Ferroviaria Italiana instead.

== Services ==
The station is served by lines SFM4 and SFM7 of the Turin Metropolitan Railway Service, operated by Trenitalia, which connect the airport to the city centre. Since December 2024 the station is also the terminus of line SFM6, which connects the airport to the city of Asti.

== See also ==
- Turin Airport
- Turin Metropolitan Railway Service
- List of railway stations in Piedmont

Preceding station	Turin SFM	Following station
San Maurizio Canavese towards Cirié	SFM4	Caselle Torinese towards Bra
Terminus	SFM6	Caselle Torinese towards Asti
San Maurizio Canavese towards Cirié	SFM7	Caselle Torinese towards Fossano
