= Turin–Ceres railway =

Railway line in Italy

Turin–Ceres railway (OPEN NOW, NEEDS UPDATE)
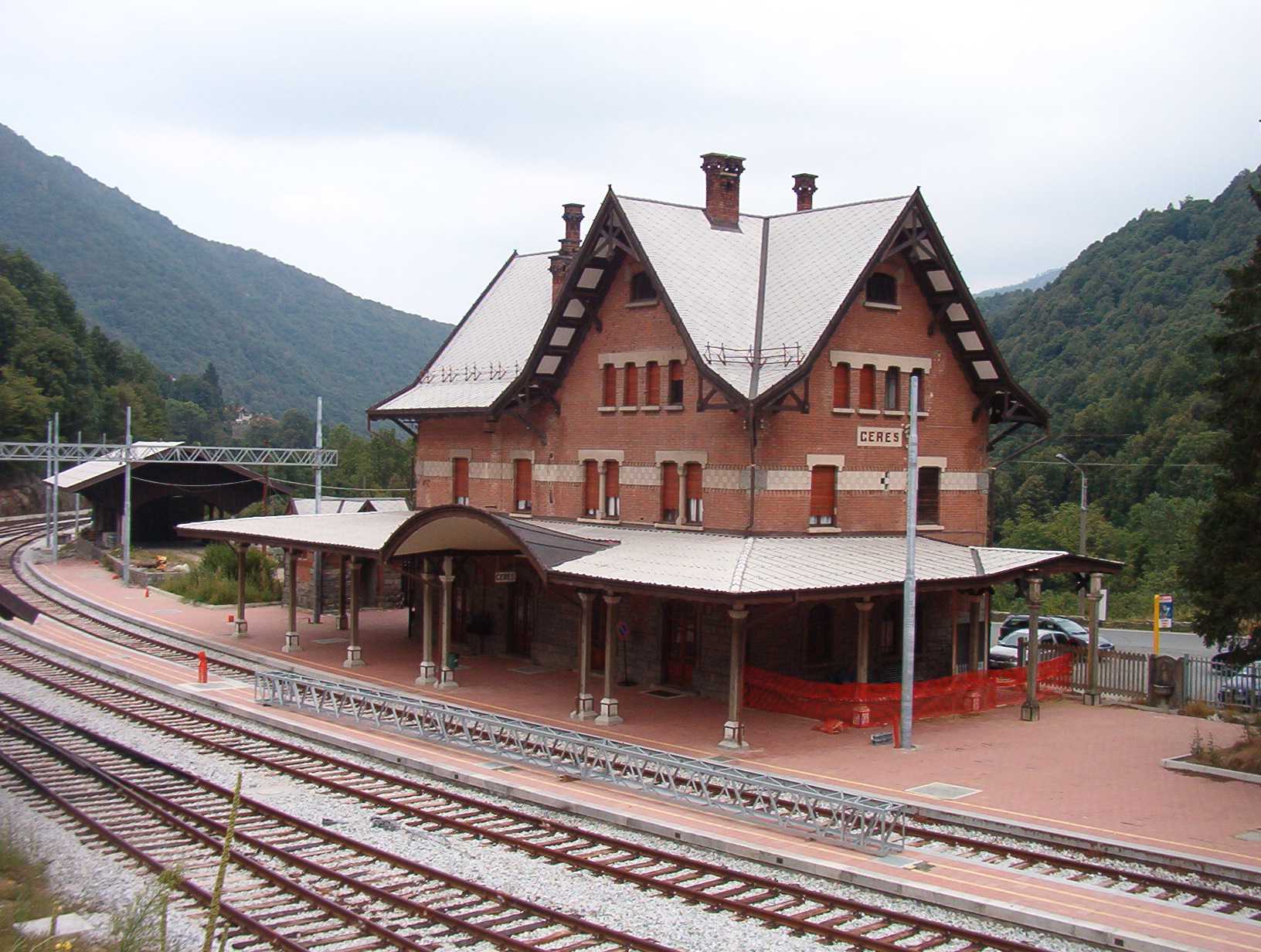
- The station of Ceres, built, like all the others in the mountain stretch of the railway, in Swiss style in the late 19th-early 20th century

Overview
- Locale: Metropolitan City of Turin, Italy
- Termini: Torino Porta Susa; Ceres

History
- Opened: 1868

Technical
- Electrification: 3,000 V DC

The Ferrovia Torino-Ceres (also known as Torino-Valli di Lanzo) is a commuter railway in the Metropolitan City of Turin (northern Italy) which is currently managed by the Gruppo Torinese Trasporti (GTT).

A first stretch of the railway, reaching Venaria Reale, was inaugurated in 1868. In 1869 the rails reached Cirié, for a total of 21.243 km and five stations. In 1916 it arrived to Ceres, for a total length of some 44 km. In 1920 it was electrified at 4,000 V direct current. Subsequently, it was standardized at 3 kV, as the rest of italian network.

The current service starts from Torino Dora station in Turin, although a significant project is in the pipeline for the next years. In order to improve the interchange network among the major railway lines, GTT has established to connect the Turin-Ceres railway to the Turin-Milan railway in the near future. The two railways will link to each other in Torino Rebaudengo Fossata station, still in Turin territory, and the Torino Dora station will be discontinued (at least as part of the Ferrovia Torino-Ceres).

A through station linked to Turin International Airport by escalators opened for the 2006 Winter Olympic Games and represents the first rail connection between Turin and its airport.

In January 2026, the line began work on technological upgrades that cost over €80 million.

== See also ==
- Turin metropolitan railway service
