= Line SFM4 =

Railway line in Turin, Italy

Line 4

Overview
- Service type: Commuter rail
- Status: Operational
- Locale: Metropolitan City of Turin
- First service: 9 December 2012
- Current operator(s): Trenitalia

Route
- Termini: Cirié; Alba
- Stops: 24

Technical
- Rolling stock: Due Piani bilevel rail cars
- Track gauge: 1,435 mm (4 ft 8 1/2 in)
- Track owner(s): Turin Metropolitan Railway Service

Line SFM4 is part of the Turin Metropolitan Railway Service. It connects the Cirié station with the Alba railway station using the Turin-Ceres railway, the Turin railway link, the Carmagnola-Bra railway and the Cavallermaggiore-Alessandria railway.

The trains, 31 in total per day, run hourly (two-hourly on holidays). The main interchange hubs are Turin Lingotto and Turin Porta Susa, both stations offer a connection to Turin Metro (Lingotto and Porta Susa metro stations respectively).

== History ==
The line was opened on 9 December 2012.

In autumn 2016, electrification works were carried out between Bra station and Alba station, at the end of which a direct connection between Alba and Turin was made possible. In addition, on weekdays except Saturdays, two pairs of trains are available to and from Turin Porta Nuova railway station, thus connecting the city of Alba to the historic centre of Turin.

Until 20 January 2024, before the activation of the connection with Ciriè along the Turin-Ceres railway, the line terminated at the Turin Stura station.

== Communes it serves ==
While Line SFM4 is completely located in Piedmont, it serves both the Metropolitan City of Turin and the province of Cuneo.

The northern part of Line SFM4 serves the following communes in the Metropolitan City of Turin:

- Cirié
- San Maurizio Canavese
- Caselle Torinese
- Borgaro Torinese
- Venaria Reale (with Rigola Stadio station serving Juventus Stadium)
- Turin
- Moncalieri
- Trofarello
- Villastellone
- Carmagnola

The southern part of Line SFM4 serves the following communes in the province of Cuneo:

- Sommariva del Bosco
- Sanfrè
- Bra
- Pocapaglia
- Santa Vittoria d'Alba
- Monticello d'Alba
- Alba

== Gallery ==
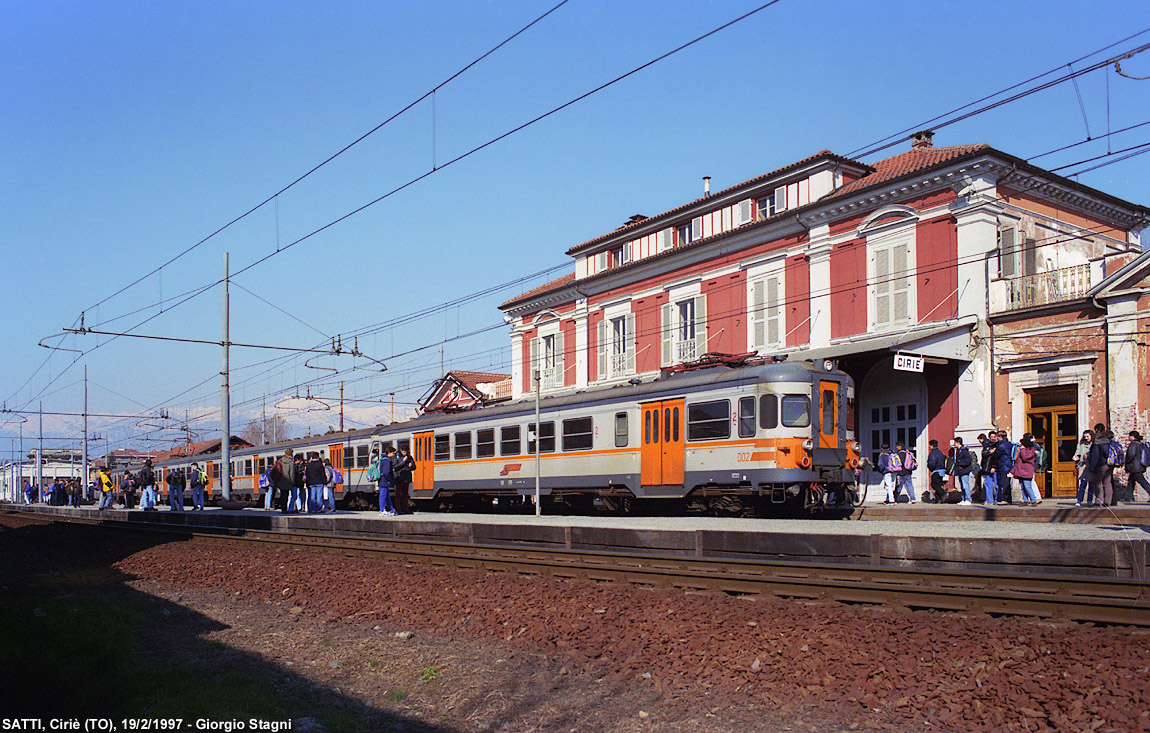
Cirié station

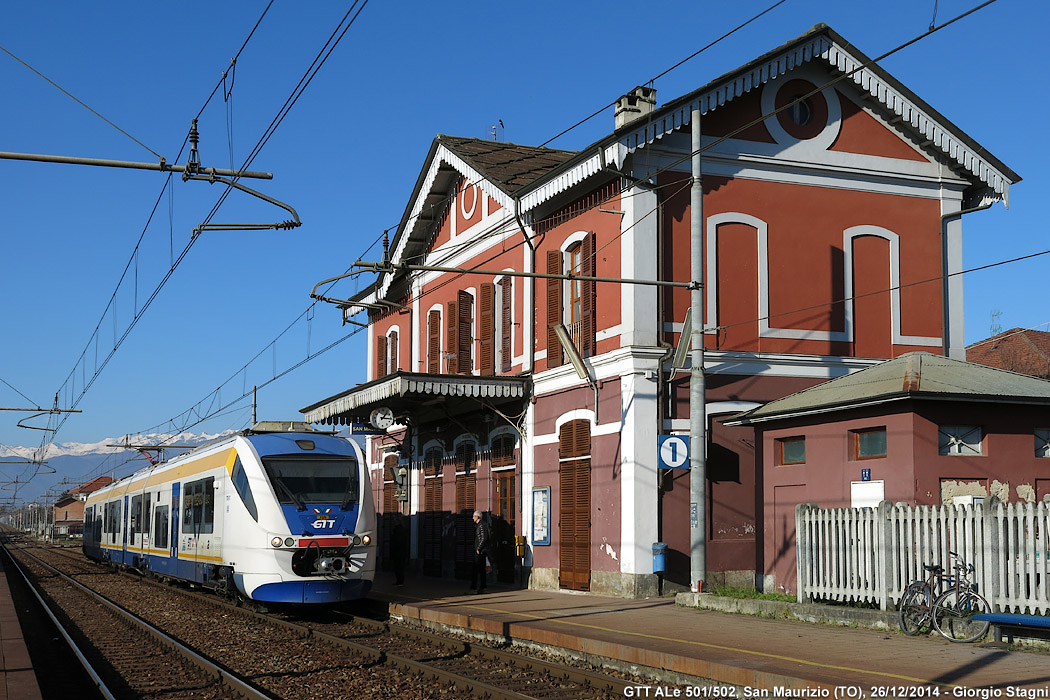
San Maurizio Canavese station

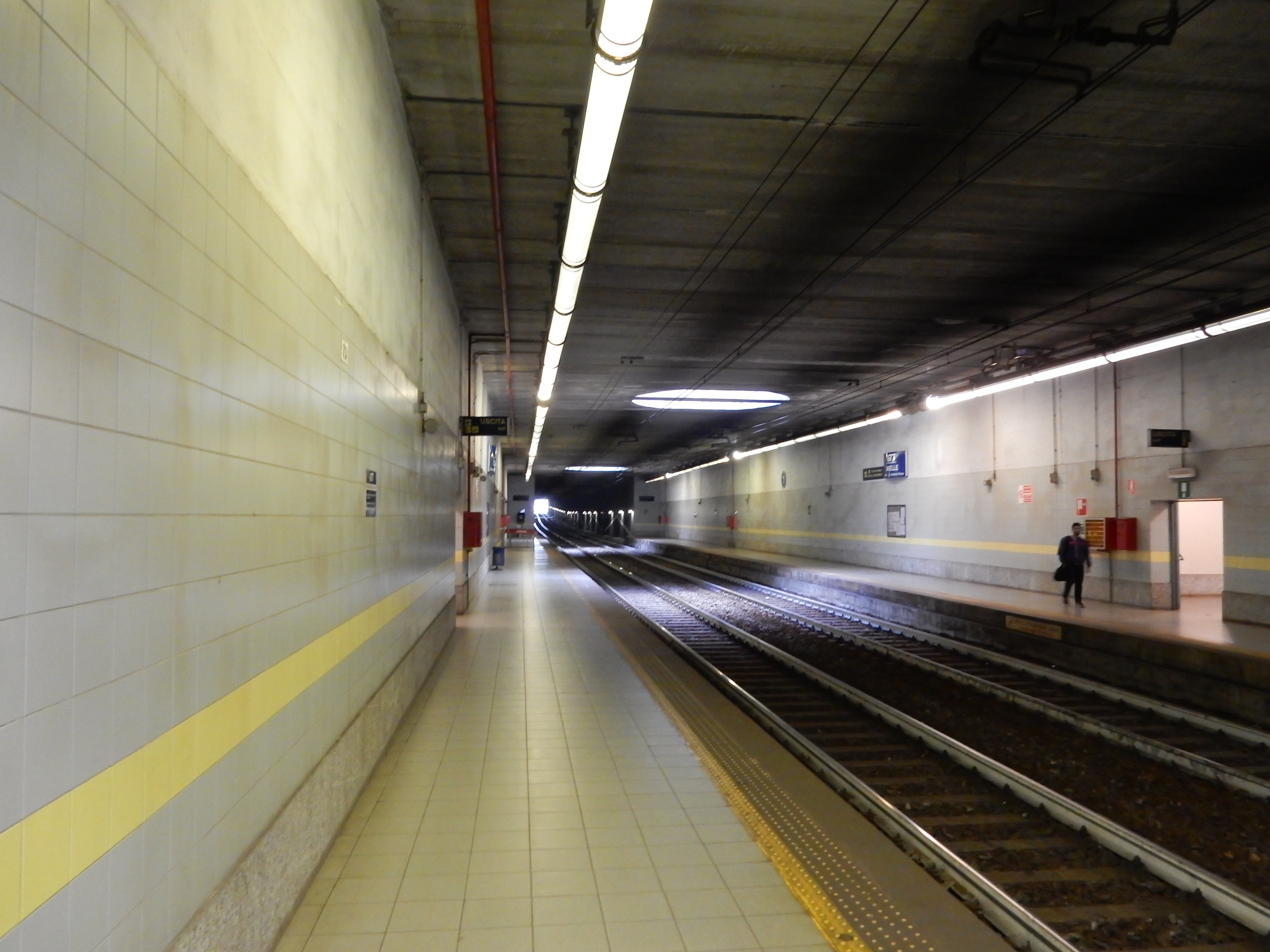
Side platforms of Caselle Torinese station

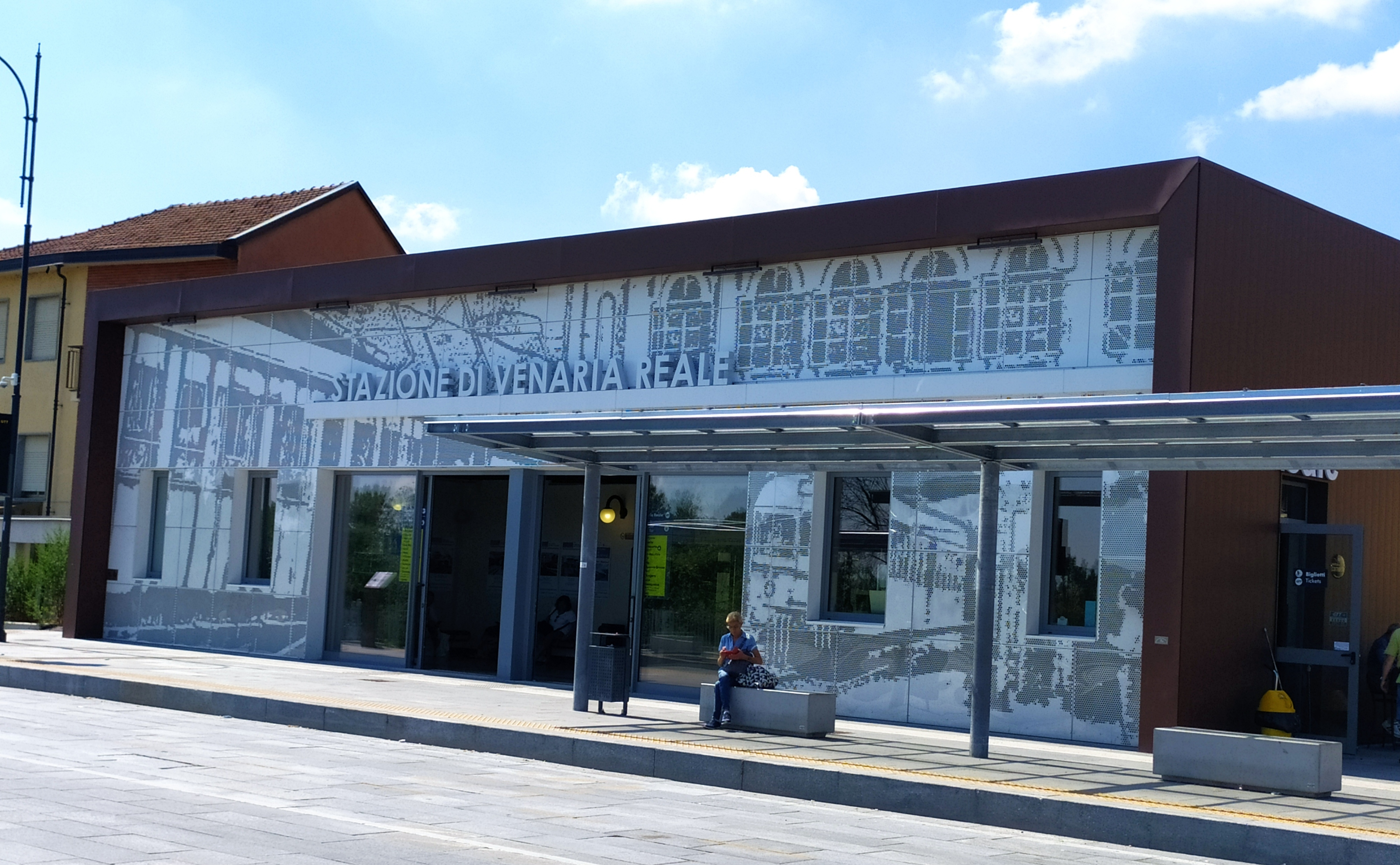
New facade of Venaria Reale station

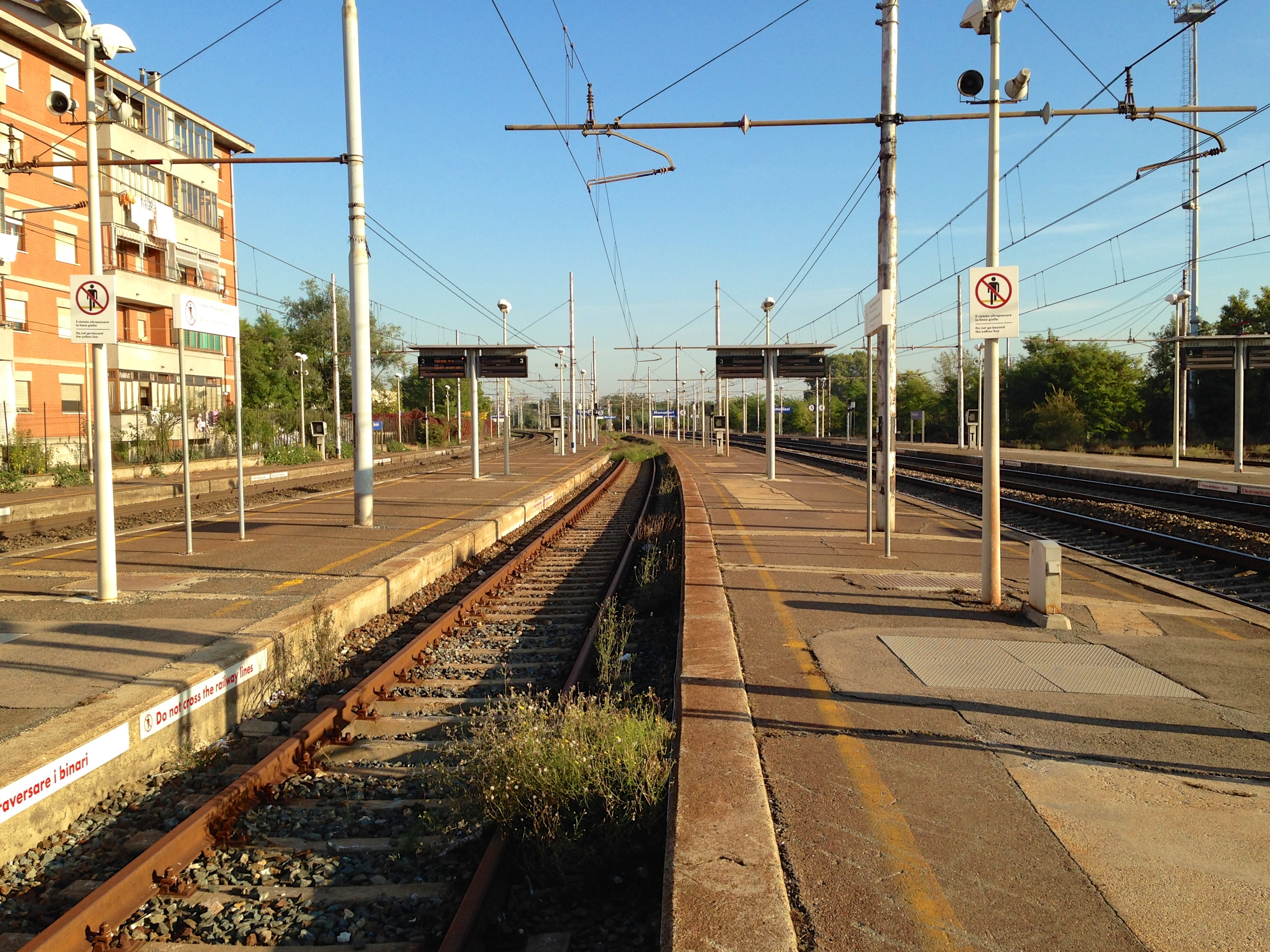
Moncalieri station

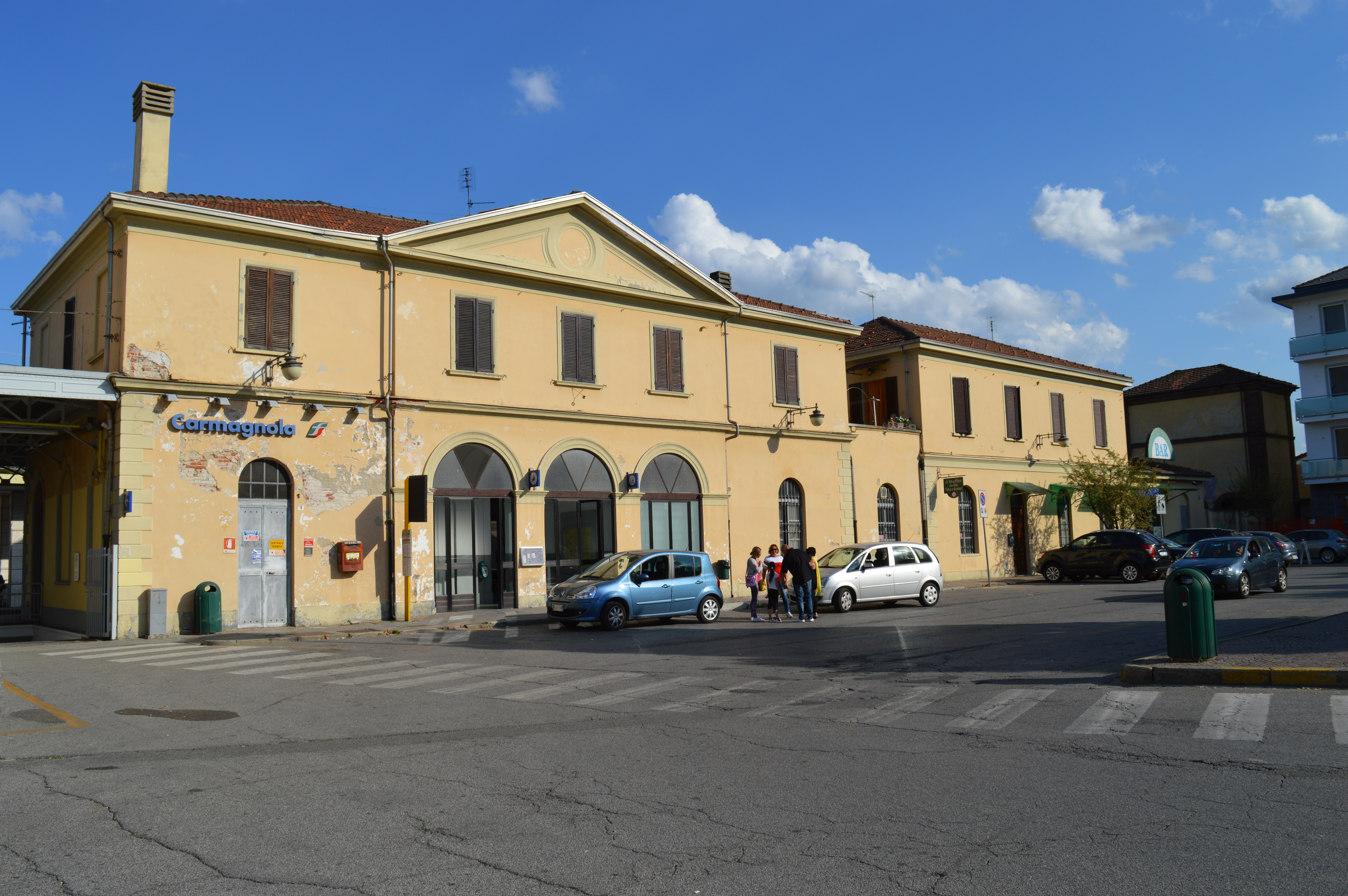
Carmagnola station entrance

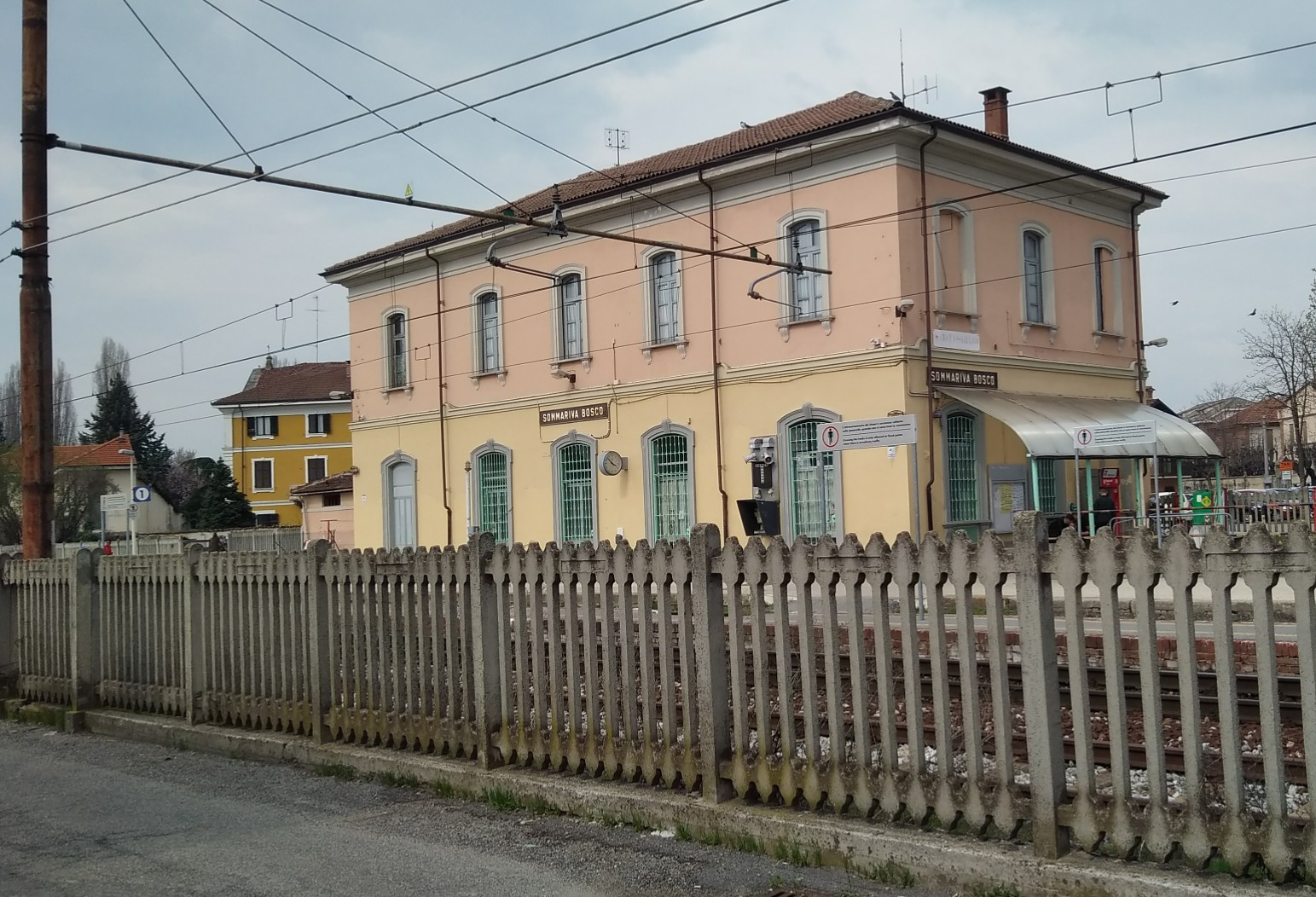
Sommariva del Bosco station, only served by Line SFM4

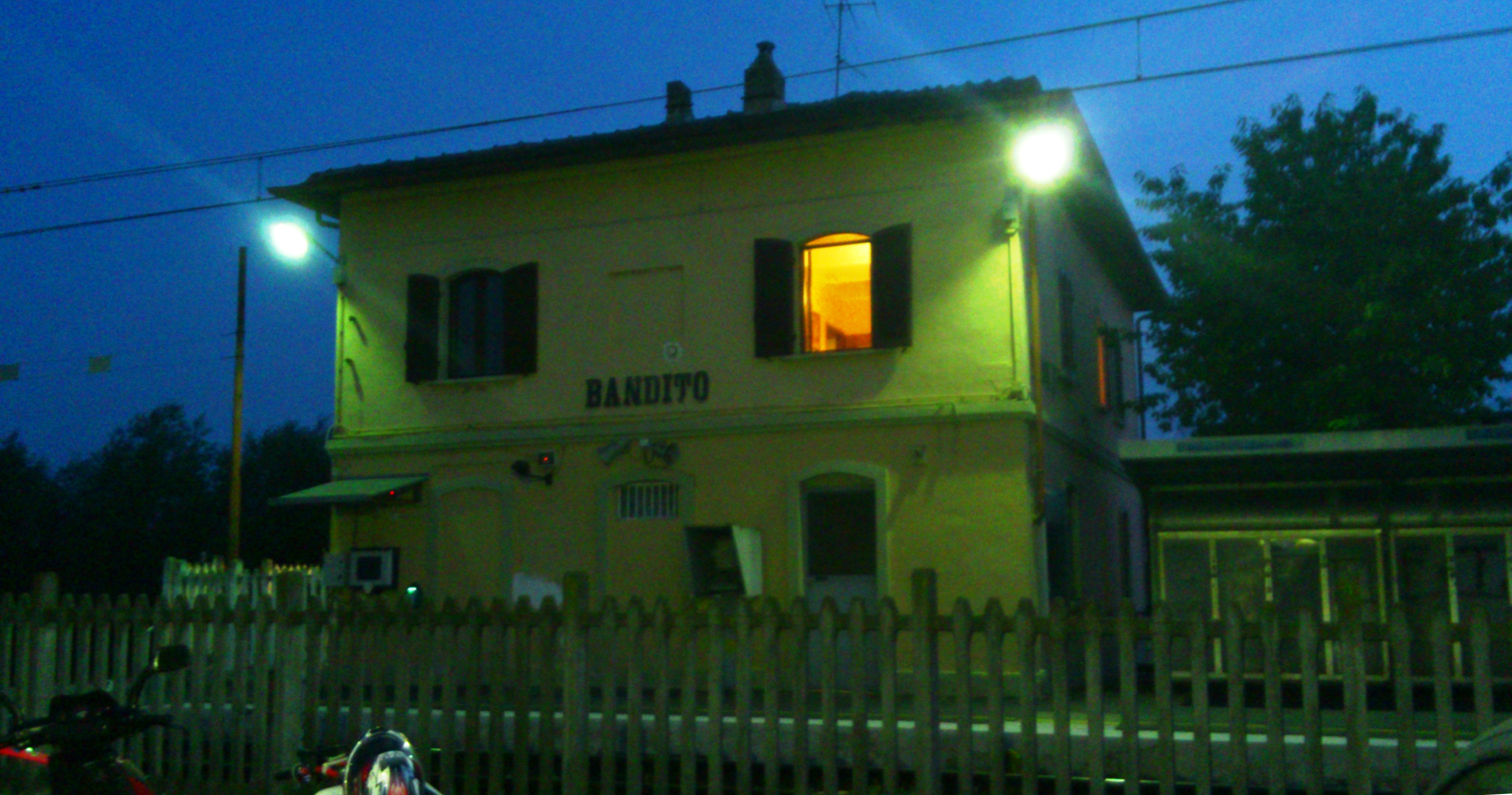
Bandito station, located in the commune of Bra

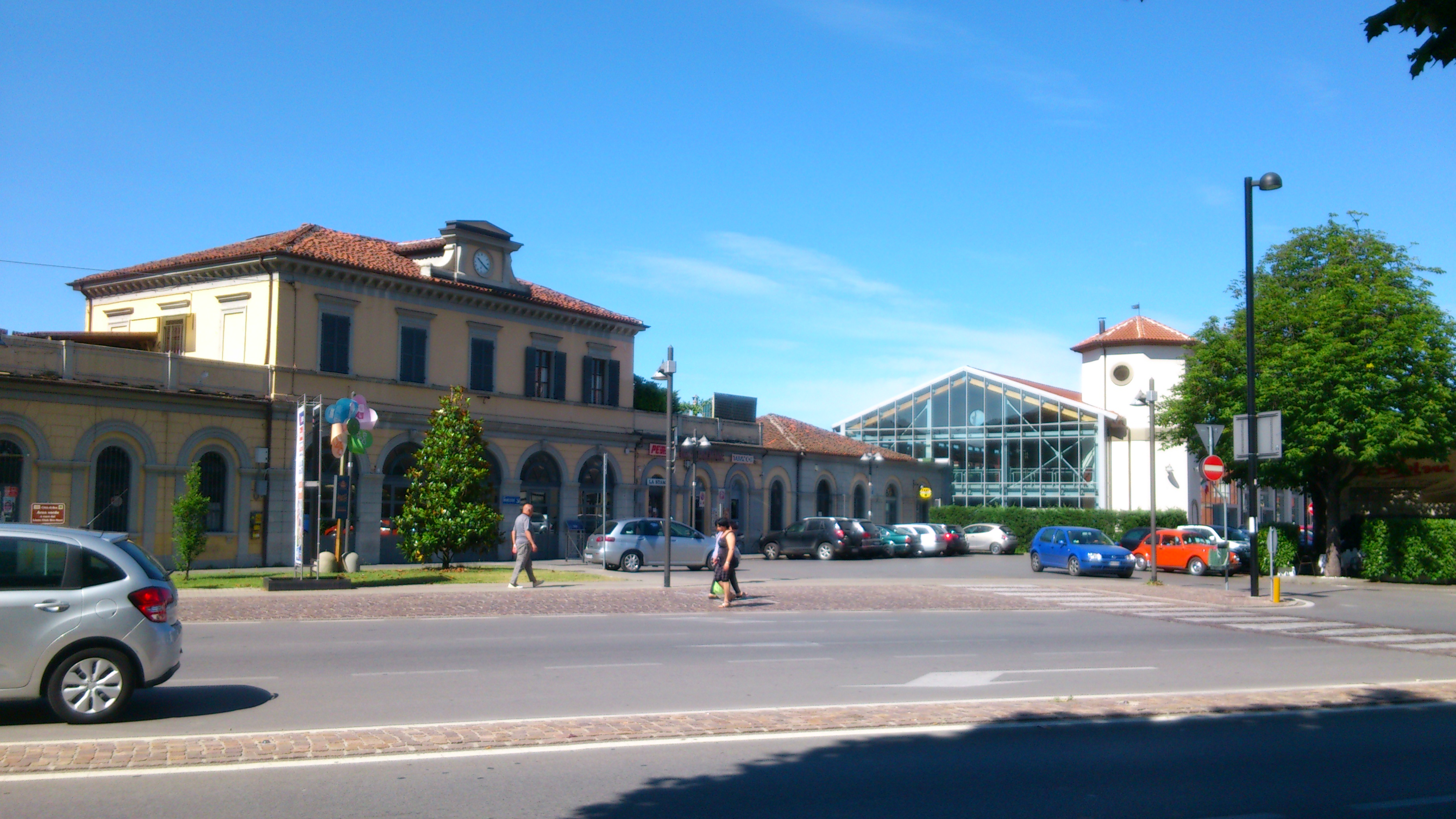
Bra station
