= Asti railway station =

Railway station in Asti, Italy

Asti
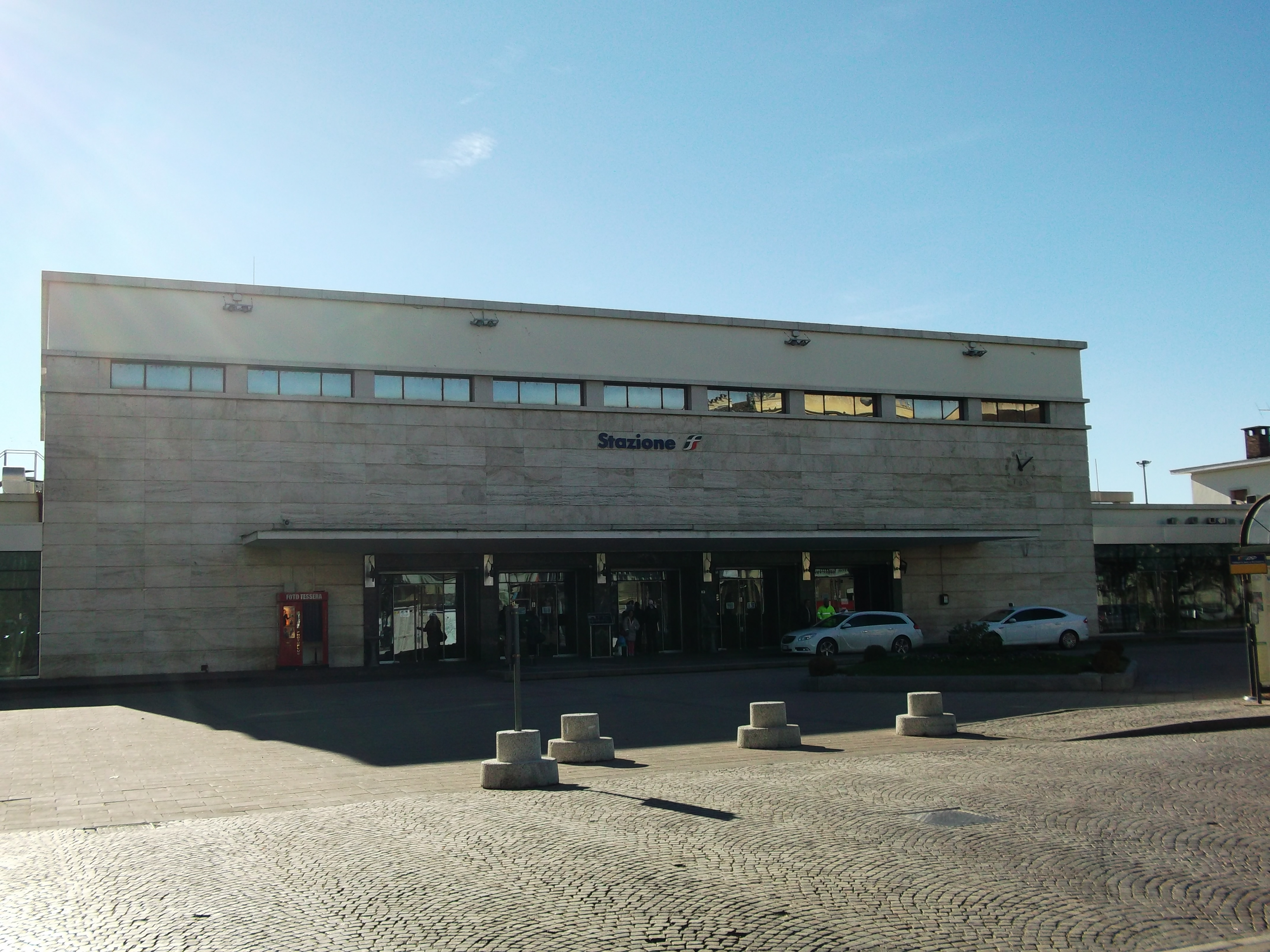
- Asti railway station

General information
- Location: Piazza Guglielmo Marconi; 14100 Asti AT; Asti, Asti, Piedmont; Italy
- Coordinates: 44°53′42″N 08°12′28″E
- Operator: Rete Ferroviaria Italiana; Centostazioni
- Lines: Turin–Genoa; Asti–Genoa; Castagnole–Asti–Mortara; Chivasso–Asti
- Distance: 55.794 km (34.669 mi) from Torino Porta Nuova
- Train operators: Trenitalia
- Connections: Urban and suburban buses

Other information
- Classification: Gold

History
- Opened: 15 November 1849; 176 years ago
Location
- Location within Piedmont Location within Northern Italy Location within Italy

Asti railway station (Italian: Stazione di Asti) serves the city and comune of Asti, in the Piedmont region, of northwestern Italy. Opened in 1849, the station forms part of the Turin–Genoa and Castagnole–Asti–Mortara railways, and is also a junction for two other lines, to Genoa and Chivasso.

The station is currently managed by Rete Ferroviaria Italiana (RFI). However, the commercial area of the passenger building is managed by Centostazioni. Train services are operated by Trenitalia. Each of these companies is a subsidiary of Ferrovie dello Stato Italiane (FS), Italy's state-owned rail company.

== History ==
The station was opened on 15 November 1849, upon the inauguration of the Trofarello–Asti section of the Turin–Genoa railway.

== Features ==
=== Structures ===
The passenger building made up of three components, distinct from each other, and connected by a glass tunnel. The main part of the building is a rectangular structure and comprises two levels, of which only the ground floor is open to the public. There are some shops and business services in the glass house connecting the main body with the two side buildings. These buildings are very similar to each other: rectangular in shape, on two levels, and constructed of whitewashed masonry.

=== Yards ===
The station yard consists of eight tracks, one of which (number four) has no platform. All of the other tracks, ranging from one through eight, have a platform protected by a long wrought iron canopy. These platforms are connected by an underpass. Each is equipped with several monitors that display information about arrival and departure of trains.

There are many other tracks, not electrified, that are dedicated to goods service. The station also has a goods yard, and a major locomotive depot with a turntable.

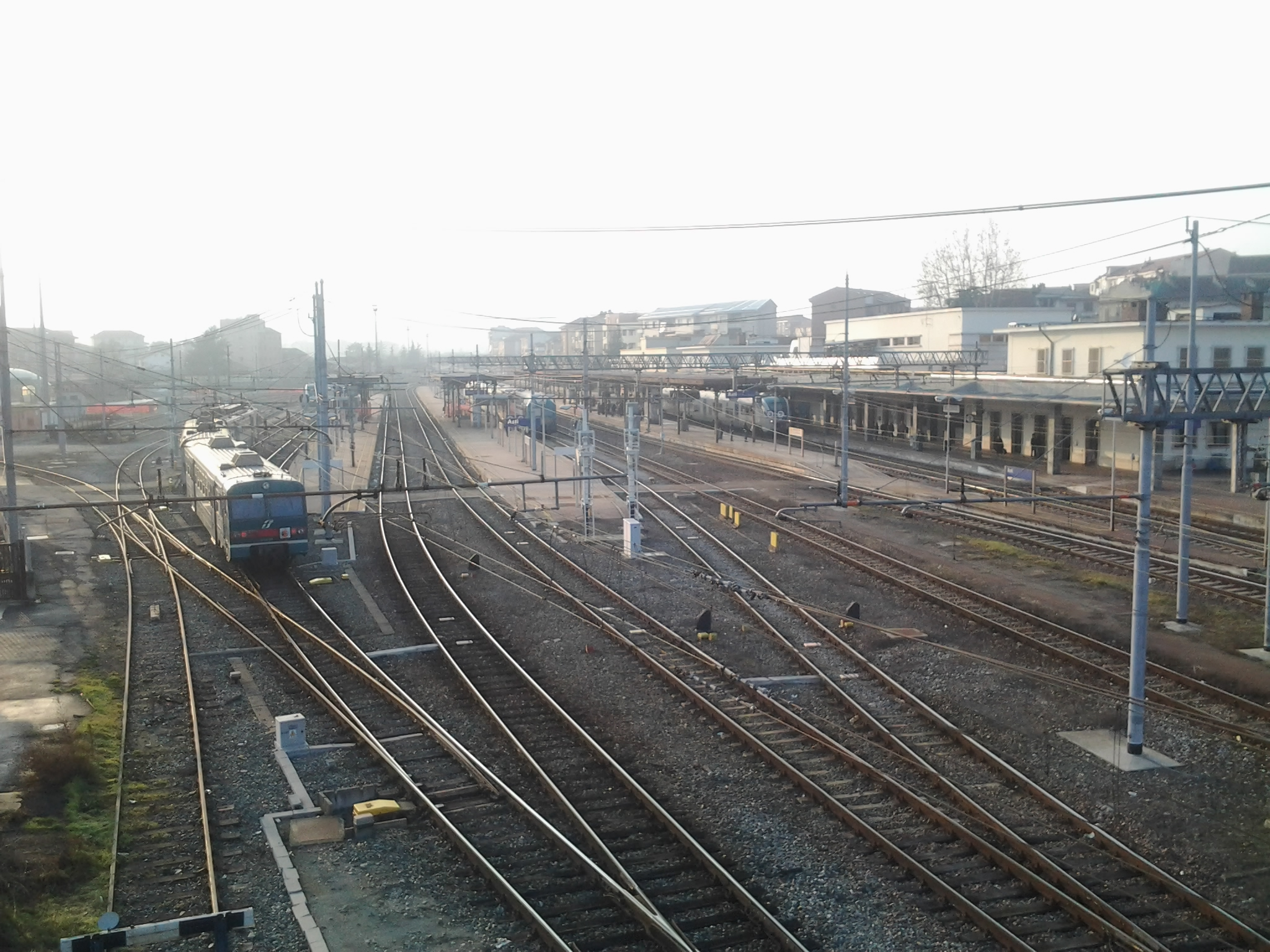
View over Asti railway station tracks

=== Renovations ===
In 2006, work was completed on the renovation of the passenger building. The work was co-financed by RFI and Centostazioni to the extent of €2.8 million, and comprised the following: renovation of the atrium, replacement of flooring, replacement of windows, renovation of the waiting room, removal of architectural barriers, installation of tactile paving, restoration of the exterior facade, and the transfer of the toilets from the eastern to the western side of the building.

Associated renovations to the square in front of the passenger building were funded by the comune, with a budget of €204,000. These renovations involved the breaking down of architectural barriers, the installation of additional street furniture, and the remodelling of interchange areas.

== Passenger and train movements ==
The station has around 6 million passenger movements each year. There are about 163 trains per day.

The trains stopping at Asti are InterCity, express and regional trains. Their main destinations are Turin, Alessandria and Acqui Terme.

== Interchange ==
In front of the passenger building is a small parking lot and a sign indicating telephone numbers for taxis, with also city bus stops.

The station also has an extra-urban buses terminal. There are many service provider like GTT and Giachino and the main destination are small nearly towns, especially in the province.

== See also ==
- History of rail transport in Italy
- List of railway stations in Piedmont
- Rail transport in Italy
- Railway stations in Italy

Preceding station	Turin SFM	Following station
San Damiano d'Asti towards Torino Aeroporto	SFM6	Terminus
