= Villastellone =

- Comune
- Comune di Villastellone
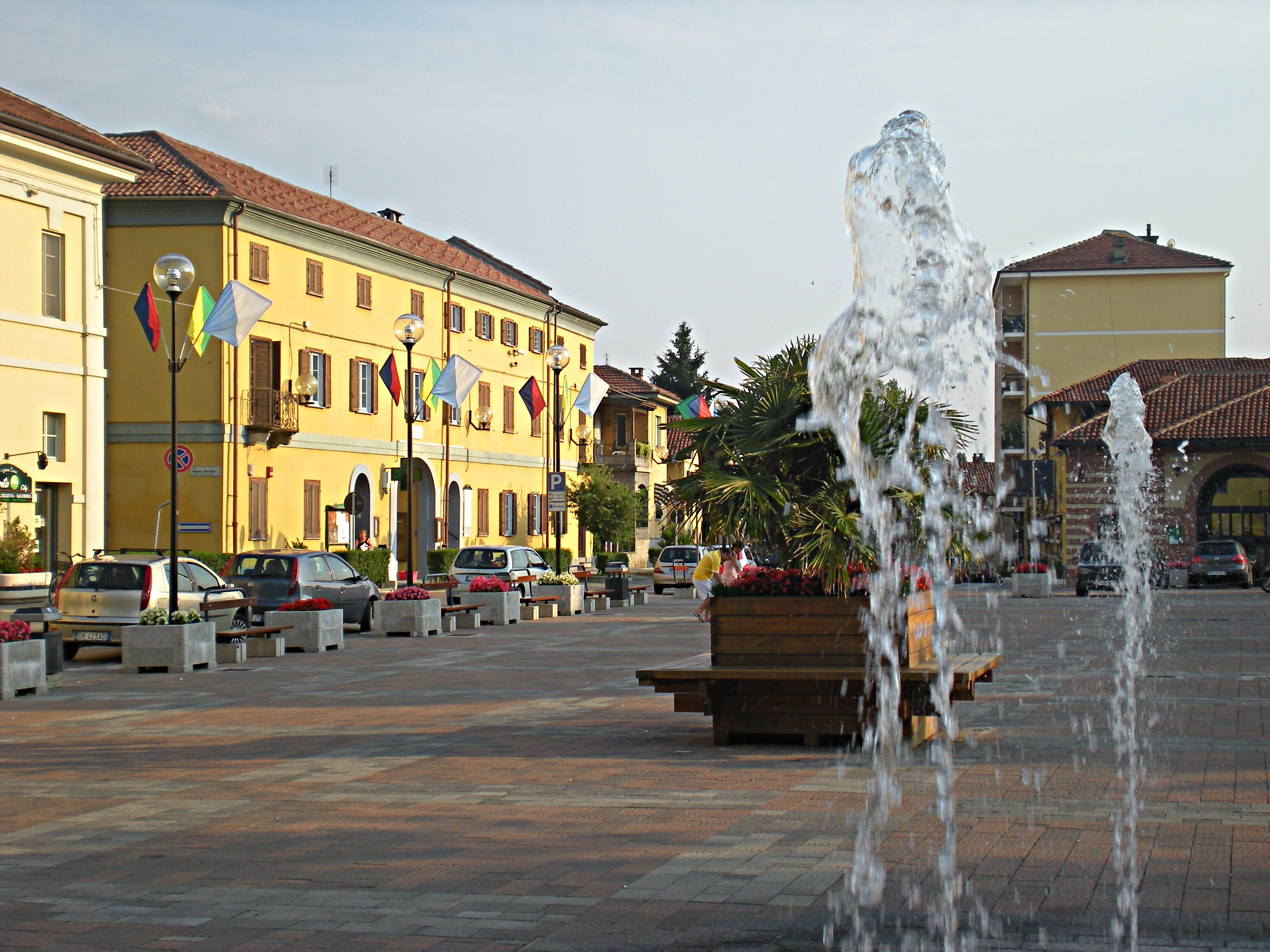

- Coat of arms

- Location within Italy Location within Piedmont
- Coordinates: 44°55′N 7°45′E
- Country: Italy
- Region: Piedmont
- Metropolitan city: Turin (TO)
- Frazioni: Borgo Cornalese, Tetti Mauritti, Cascina Monache, Fortepasso, Fontanacervo

Government
  - Mayor: Francesco Principi

Area
  - Total: 19.88 km^{2} (7.68 sq mi)
- Elevation: 234 m (768 ft)

Population (1 January 2024)
  - Total: 4,374
  - Density: 220.0/km^{2} (569.8/sq mi)
- Demonym: Villastellonese(i)
- Time zone: UTC+1 (CET)
  - Summer (DST): UTC+2 (CEST)
- Postal code: 10029
- Dialing code: 011
- Patron saint: St. Anne
- Saint day: 26 July

Villastellone is a comune (municipality) in the Metropolitan City of Turin in the Italian region Piedmont, located about 15 km south of Turin.

Villastellone borders the following municipalities: Moncalieri, Cambiano, Santena, Poirino, Carignano, and Carmagnola. It is home to a "castle", a Baroque villa attributed to Filippo Juvarra built on a pre-existing medieval fortification starting from 1735.
