= Alba railway station =

Railway station in Italy

Alba
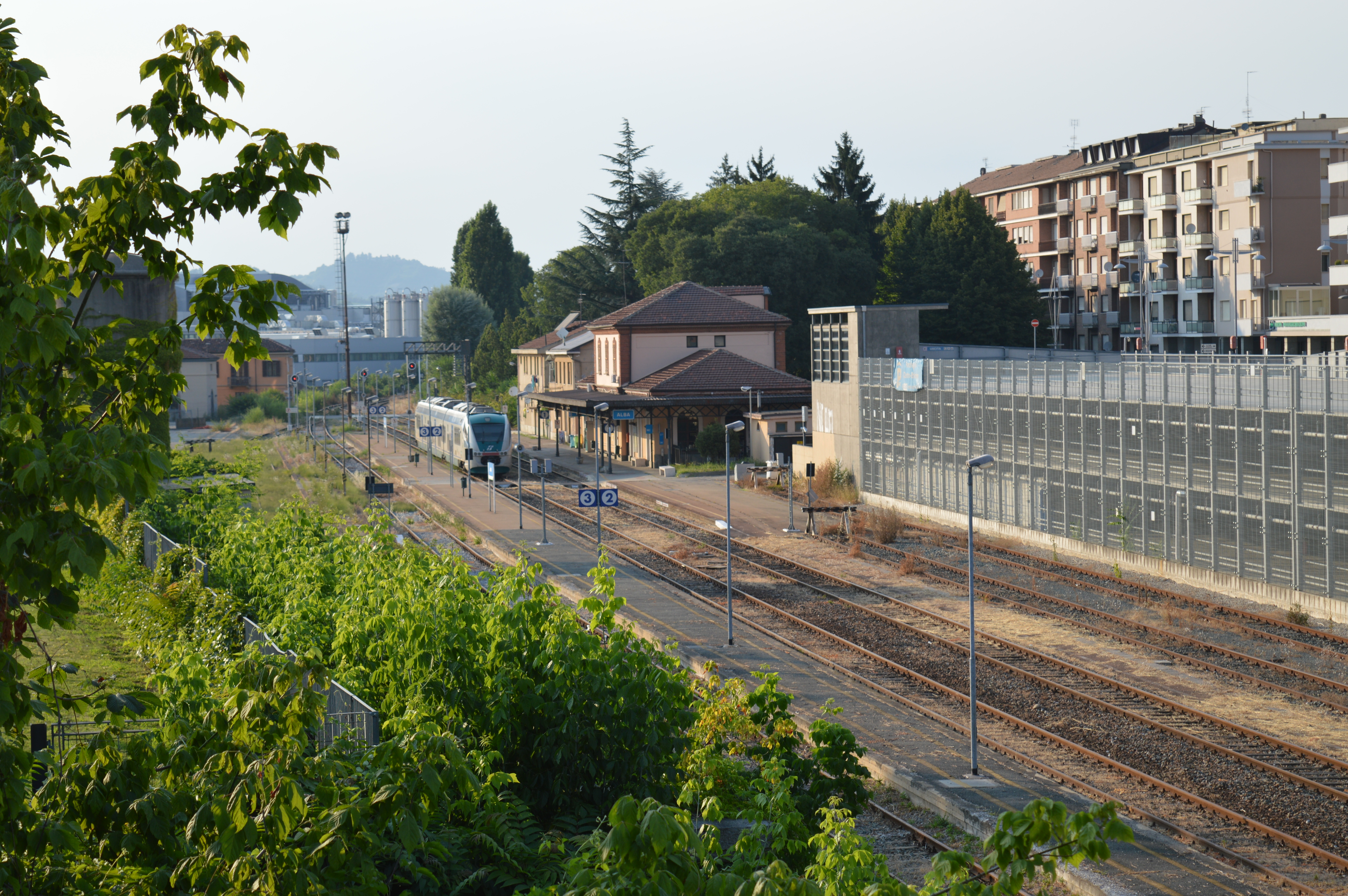

General information
- Location: Piazza Trento e Trieste 1, Alba; Alba, Cuneo, Piedmont; Italy
- Coordinates: 44°41′52″N 08°01′51″E
- Owner: Rete Ferroviaria Italiana
- Operator: Rete Ferroviaria Italiana
- Line: Alessandria - Cavallermaggiore
- Train operators: Trenitalia
- Connections: Local buses

Other information
- Classification: Silver

History
- Opened: 20 October 1864; 161 years ago
Location
- Location within Piedmont Location within Northern Italy Location within Italy

Alba railway station (Italian: Stazione di Alba) serves the town and comune of Alba, in the Piedmont region of northwestern Italy.

== History ==
The Alba station opened for service in 1865, as part of the Canelli to Bra line extension.

The station was closed for 12 years, along with a suspension of the rest of the Alba-Asti railway line, from 2010 to 2023, due to repairs and improvements. After the suspension was lifted, service resumed for Alba to Asti. In 2024, new overnight service from Rome to Alba was announced.
