= Line SFM7 =

Railway line in Turin, Italy

Line 7

Overview
- Service type: Commuter rail
- Status: Operational
- Locale: Metropolitan City of Turin, province of Cuneo
- First service: 9 June 2013
- Successor: Trenitalia

Route
- Termini: Cirié; Fossano
- Stops: 19

Technical
- Track gauge: 1,435 mm (4 ft 8 1/2 in)
- Track owner: Turin Metropolitan Railway Service

Line SFM7 is a commuter rail line that is part of the Turin Metropolitan Railway Service, and connects Cirié station with Fossano station, using the Turin-Ceres railway, the Turin railway link and the Turin-Fossano-Savona railway. The trains, 34 in total per day, run every hour (two-hourly on holidays). The main interchange hubs are Turin Lingotto and Turin Porta Susa stations.

The line was opened on 9 June 2013. Rolling stock used are MDVC carriages, MDVE carriages, and Vivalto bi-level coaches.

Until 20 January 2024, before the activation of the connection with Cirié along the Turin-Ceres railway, the line terminated at the Turin Stura station.

== Communes it serves ==
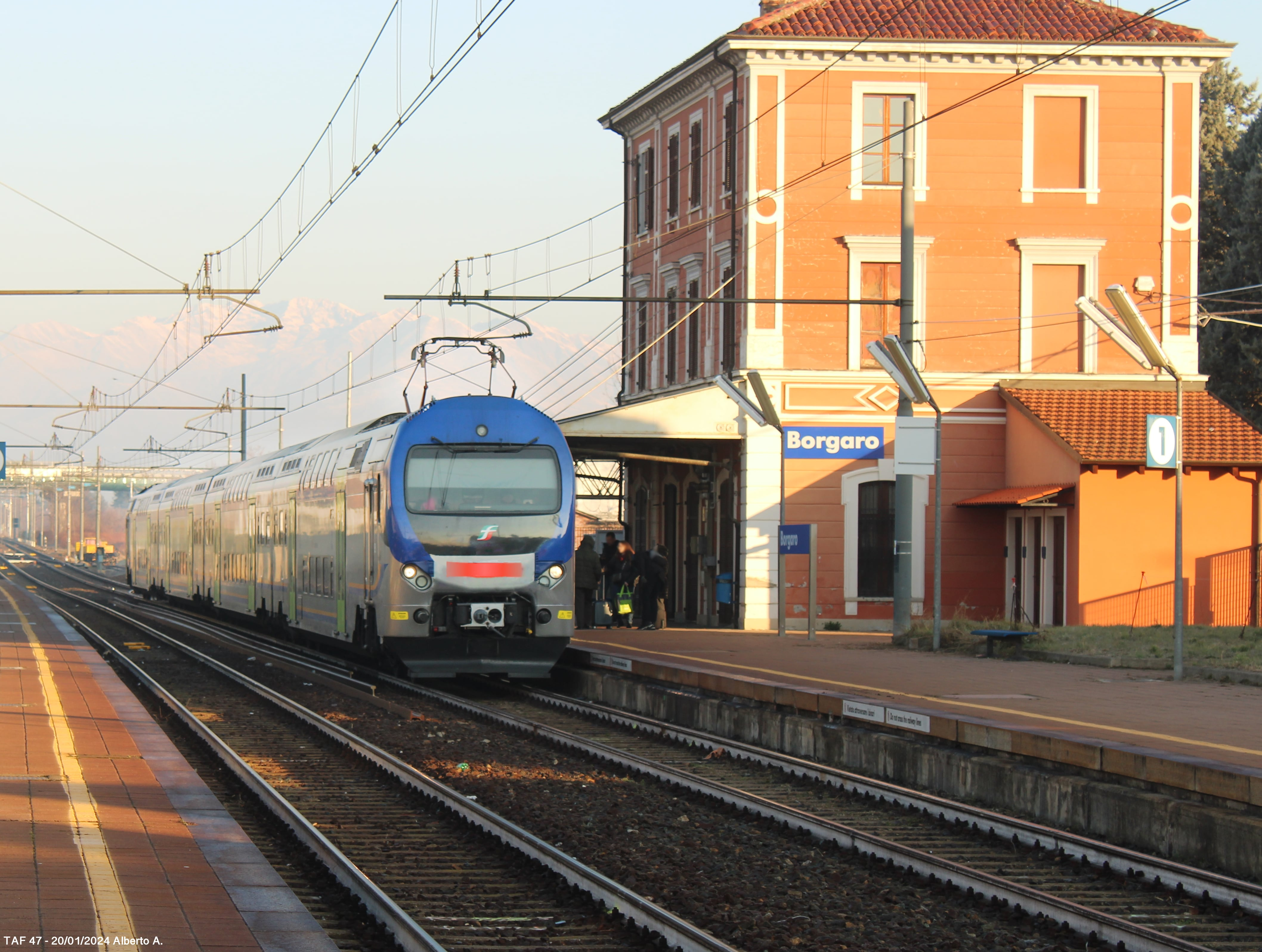
Borgaro station, being served by a TAF 47 Line SFM7 train

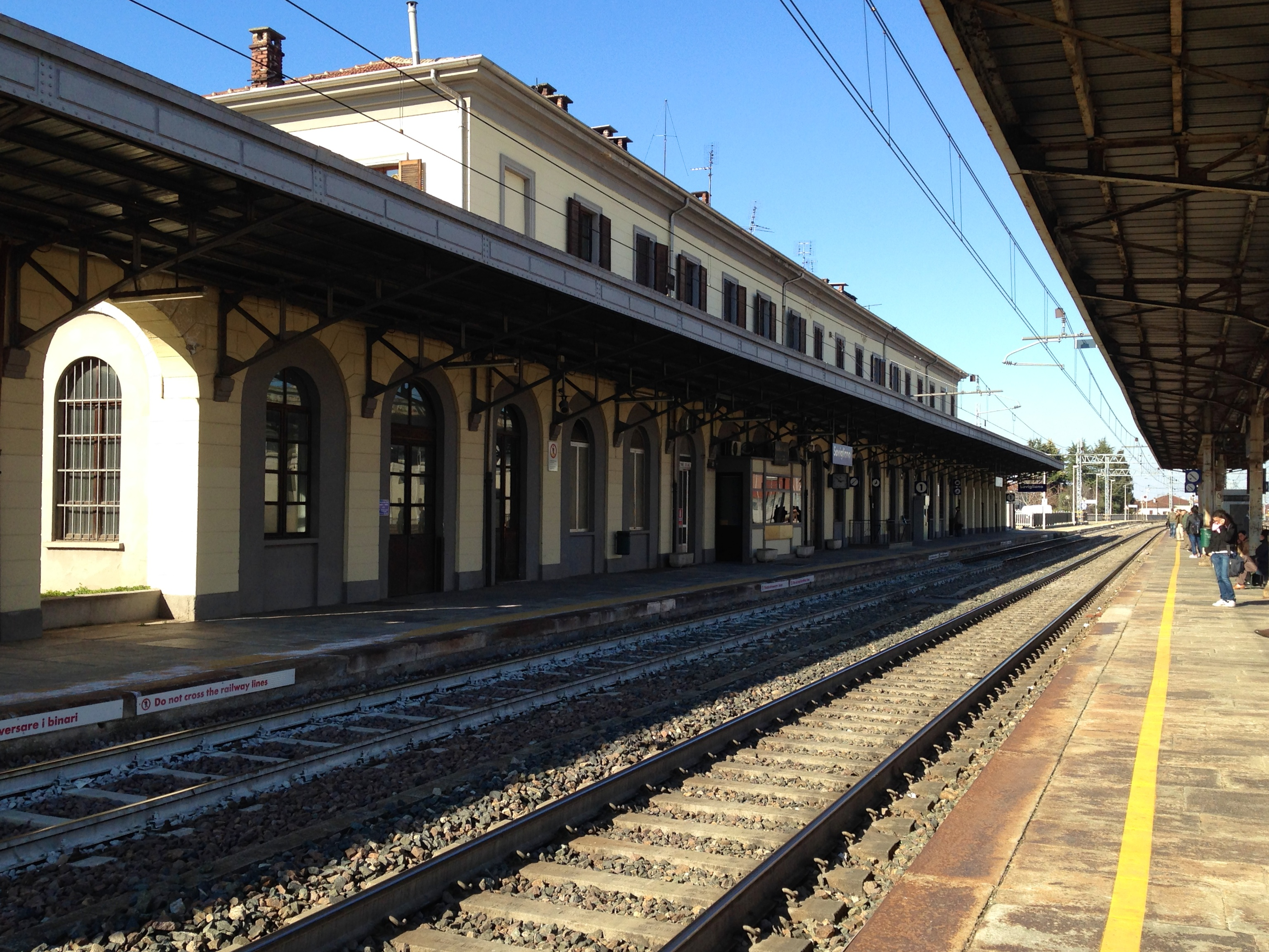
Savigliano railway station, the penultimate station of Line SFM7 towards Fossano

While Line SFM7 is completely located in Piedmont, it serves both the Metropolitan City of Turin and the province of Cuneo.

The northern part of the line serves the following communes in the Metropolitan City of Turin:

- Cirié
- San Maurizio Canavese
- Caselle Torinese
- Borgaro Torinese
- Venaria Reale (with Rigola Stadio station serving Juventus Stadium)
- Turin
- Moncalieri
- Trofarello
- Villastellone
- Carmagnola

The southern part of the line serves the following communes in the province of Cuneo:

- Racconigi
- Cavallermaggiore
- Savigliano
- Fossano
