= Chieri railway station =

Railway station in Italy

Chieri
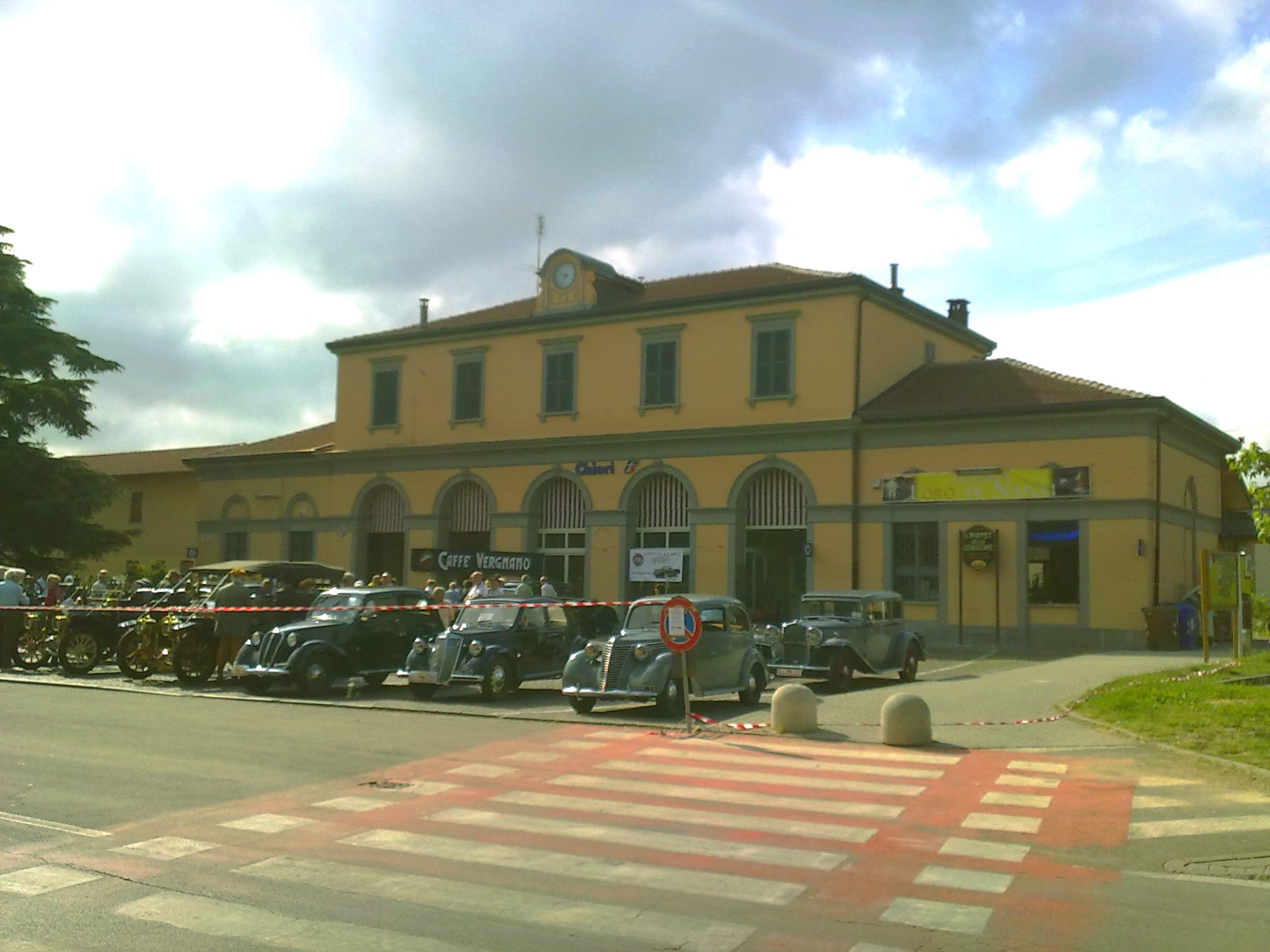

General information
- Location: Piazza Don Bosco 1, Chieri; Chieri, Metropolitan City of Turin, Piedmont; Italy
- Coordinates: 45°00′23″N 7°49′24″E
- Owner: Rete Ferroviaria Italiana
- Operator: Rete Ferroviaria Italiana
- Line: Trofarello – Chieri
- Platforms: 2
- Train operators: Trenitalia
- Connections: VIGO Urban Line 1 buses

Other information
- Classification: Bronze

History
- Opened: 1874
Location
- Location within Piedmont Location within Northern Italy Location within Italy

Chieri railway station (Italian: Stazione di Chieri) serves the town and comune of Chieri, in the Piedmont region of northwestern Italy.

== Services ==
Preceding station	Turin SFM	Following station
Trofarello towards Pont Canavese	SFM1	Terminus
