= Turin Metropolitan Railway Service =

Commuter rail system in Turin, Italy

Turin Metropolitan Railway Service SFM

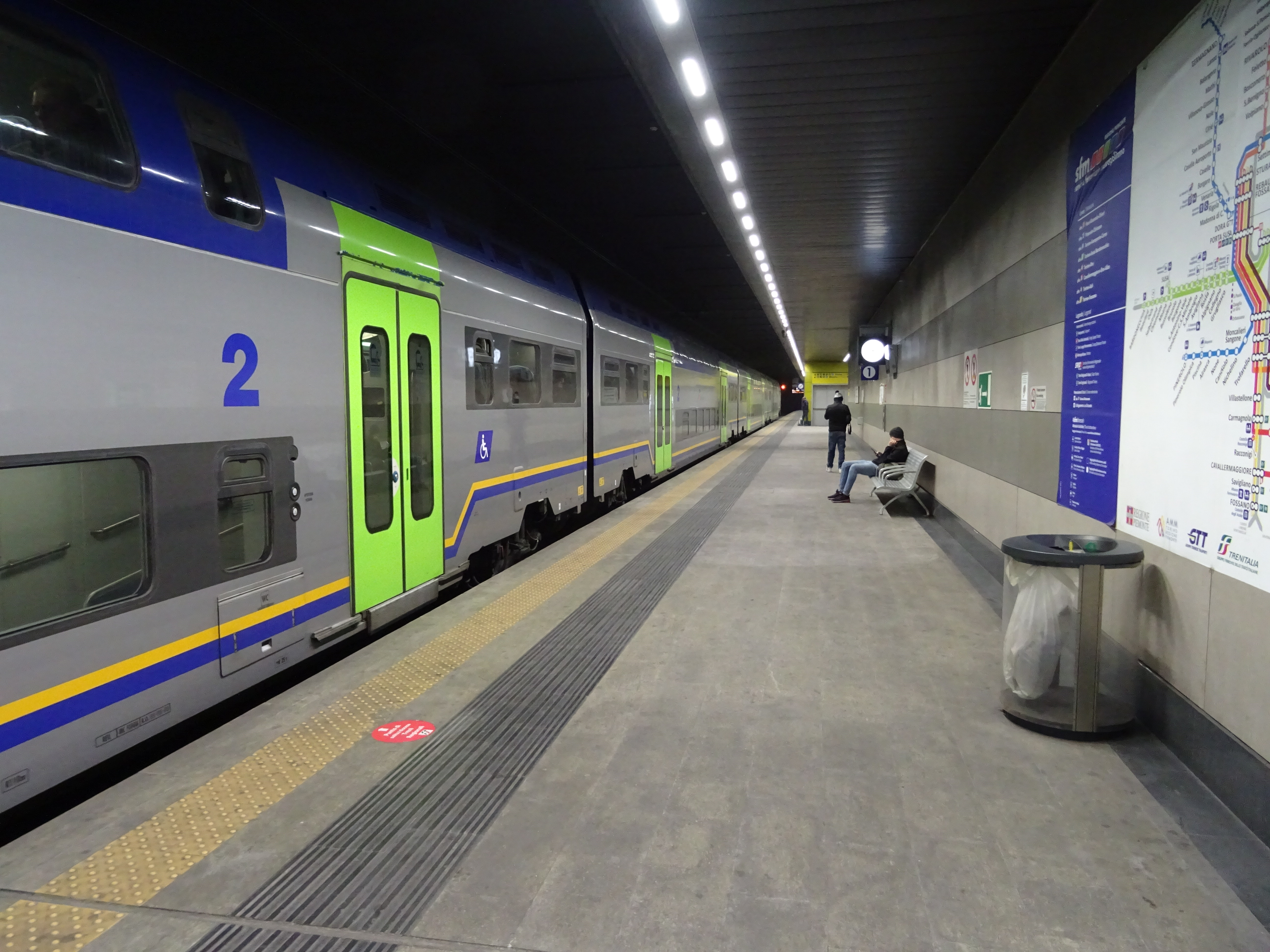

Overview
- Locale: (Piedmont) Metropolitan City of Turin
- Transit type: Commuter rail
- Number of lines: 6
- Number of stations: 93
- Website: http://www.sfmtorino.it/

Operation
- Began operation: 9 December 2012
- Operators: Trenitalia, GTT (in the past)
- Infrastructure managers: RFI, GTT (in the past)

Technical
- System length: 455 km (283 mi)
- Track gauge: 1,435 mm (4 ft 8 1/2 in) standard gauge
System map

The Turin Metropolitan Railway Service (Italian: Servizio Ferroviario Metropolitano), simply known as SFM, is a commuter rail system serving the metropolitan area of Turin, Italy. The system comprises 6 lines operated by Trenitalia, serving 93 stations.

The core of the system is the passante ferroviario, a tunnel running 8 km through the city from north to south at a maximum depth of 18 meters. The tunnel allows passengers to travel from Torino Stura station to Torino Lingotto station in 15 minutes.

== Network ==
Line	Terminals	Year opened	Last extension	Length	Stations	Operator
Line SFM1	Rivarolo – Chieri	2012	2013	75 kilometres (47 mi)	19	GTT
Line SFM2	Chivasso – Pinerolo	2012		62 kilometres (39 mi)	15	Trenitalia
Line SFM3	Bardonecchia/Susa – Torino Porta Nuova	2012		95 kilometres (59 mi)	19	Trenitalia
Line SFM4	Cirié – Alba	2012	2024	60 kilometres (37 mi)	17	Trenitalia
Line SFM6	Torino Aeroporto – Asti	2013	2024	75 kilometres (47 mi)	17	Trenitalia
Line SFM7	Cirié – Fossano	2013	2024	75 kilometres (47 mi)	12	Trenitalia
Line SFMA	Ceres - Cirié	2024		45 kilometres (28 mi)	21	GTT
Former services
Line SFMB	Cavallermaggiore – Bra	2013	2020 (line suppressed)	13 kilometres (8.1 mi)	3	Trenitalia

== History ==
- 1999: The project was born from a proposal by the Piedmont Region to make the best use of the railway infrastructure works being carried out in the city. (the "railway bypass").
- 2006: The Turin Metropolitan Mobility Agency resumes planning after the future SFM lines have been transferred to the management of the Agency itself.
- 4 December 2012: The service is officially presented at the Mole Antonelliana in the presence of the President and Councillor for Transport of the Piedmont Region, the Mayor of Turin representing the 60 municipalities reached by the SFM and the top management of Ferrovie dello Stato and GTT.
- 9 December 2012: Activation with five metropolitan railway lines, 1, 2, 3, 4, A, following the modernization of the Turin Passante Ferroviario (quadrupling of the tracks, burying and construction of intermediate stops). The service is based on a daily traffic of 256 trains per day through 75 stations.
- February 1, 2013: The official portal of the service is born.
- June 9, 2013: The SFM 7 (Turin-Fossano) and SFM B (Cavallermaggiore-Bra-Alba) lines are established . The service now covers 85 stations and 326 trains.
- 19 August 2013: The tender notice for the construction of the Rebaudengo - Grosseto interconnection project was published for a total amount of 180 million Euro.
- October 14, 2013: The New Integrated Single-Journey Ticket is born. A single travel ticket in the U - A - B areas (respectively €2, €2.50, €3) to use all means of transport: SFM - Metro - Tram - Bus
- December 15, 2013: SFM 6 (Turin-Asti) is born. The service changes to 8 lines on 93 stations, 358 trains and 500 km.
- February 12, 2014: Agreements signed for the financing of the infrastructure works necessary for the activation of the SFM5 Orbassano - Torino Stura for a total amount of 18.5 million Euro.
- 10 September 2017: the SFM 3 line is extended to the French station of Modane, with 14 pairs of trains to and from Turin.
- On March 13, 2020, the SFM B line was eliminated, switching to 'SFR', the line is suspended until further notice. From September 14, 2020, it will be replaced by 6 pairs of buses from Monday to Saturday.
- On 25 August 2020, the railway section between the Torino Dora GTT and Madonna di Campagna stations was decommissioned for the completion of the works on the tunnel under Corso Grosseto, which will serve as an underground connection to the Torino-Ceres railway (SFM A line), which has been isolated since 2009, after the surface railway was buried.
- On 1 January 2021, the Canavesana railway, part of the SFM1 line, will be managed by Trenitalia, which will initially operate the Minuetto and Pop trains on the line. The arrival of the Vivalto and Rock trains is also expected later.
- On January 19, 2024, the extensions of the SFM lines 4 and 7 to Cirié were inaugurated at the same time as the reopening of the Turin-Ceres railway, which is now interconnected with the passante ferroviario.

=== Infrastructure ===
The major intervention required by SFM is the construction of the railway underpass, which replaced the historic line on the same surface route, and was activated in December 2012. The reconnection between the SFM A line and the railway underpass is planned, having been cut off at Turin Dora Station by the lowering of the track level of the TO-MI railway by 14 m (46 ft). In addition to this infrastructure, two new stations will be built along the new connecting route under Corso Grosseto and the current stations will be redeveloped.

A technological intervention is planned in the bypass to allow a 4-minute spacing between trains.

=== Tickets ===
Tickets for SFM are integrated with the GTT urban service, meaning you can use any public transport (bus, tram, metro and railways) within the urban area of Turin for the entire validity of the ticket. There are 3 types of tickets available that can be purchased at all authorised GTT retailers, newsagents and tobacconists:

Integrated A (cost €3.50) urban area and first belt. Valid for 100 minutes on the GTT urban and suburban network, on the metro (1 journey only) and on the Trenitalia and GTT railway lines. Integrated B (cost €4.00) urban area, first and second belt. Valid for 120 minutes on the GTT urban and suburban network, on the metro (1 journey only), on the Trenitalia and GTT railway lines and on the extra-urban bus lines managed by Extra.To. Both tickets are now sold only in chip-on-paper format, replacing the old magnetic stripe format.

=== Network Evolution ===
Mappa animata dell'evoluzione della rete

The network from December 2012 to June 2013.

The network from June 2013 to December 2013.

The network since December 2013.

The September 2017 network.

== Future Projects ==
The map of future system that sees the birth of the new line 5 and, with the tunnel in Corso Grosseto, the extension of line 4 to Ceres and the extension of line 2 towards Torre Pellice at the end of all upgrade works

Line	Terminals	Estimated Completion	Project Type	Status
Line SFM6	Asti - Turin Airport	October 1, 2024	Extension	Works in Progress
SFM5	Torino Stura - Orbassano	2025	New line	Works in Progress
Line SFM3	Bardonecchia - Turin Airport	2027	Extension	Works in Progress
SFM8	Chivasso - Turin Lingotto	2027	New Line	In Progress
Line SFM7	Cirié - Ceres	-	Extension	Works in Progress

== Rolling stock ==
- : Minuetto (GTT)
- : TAF (Trenitalia)
- : MDVC and Vivalto (Trenitalia)
- : Due Piani (Trenitalia)
- : Minuetto (GTT)
