= Fossano railway station =

Railway station in Italy

Fossano
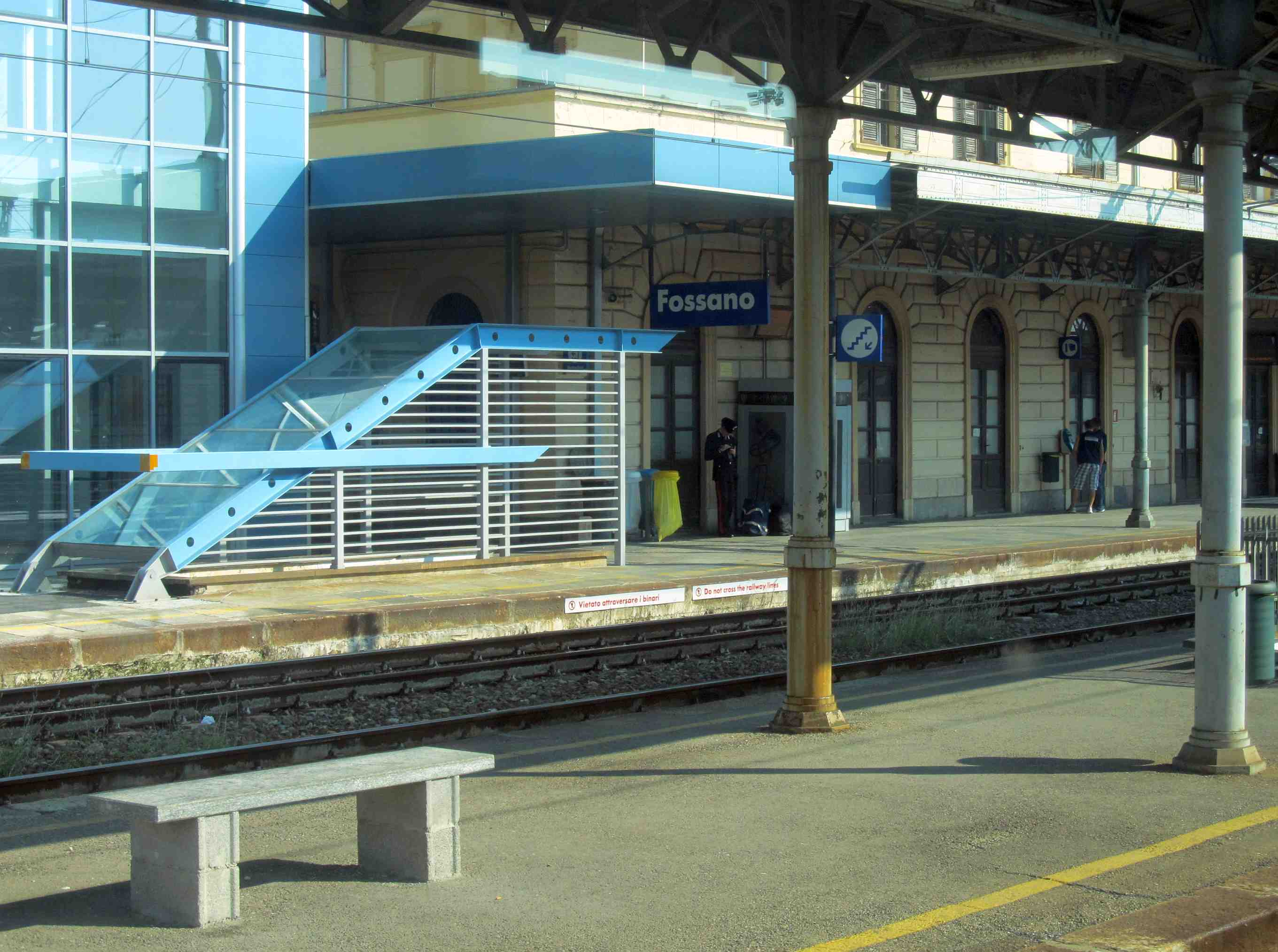

General information
- Location: Piazza Kennedy, 2; 12045 Fossano CN; Fossano, Cuneo, Piedmont; Italy
- Coordinates: 44°33′01″N 07°43′05″E
- Operator: RFI
- Lines: Turin–Savona; Fossano–Cuneo
- Distance: 50.541 km (31.405 mi) from Torino Porta Nuova; 50.491 km (31.374 mi) from Cuneo
- Platforms: 4
- Tracks: 7
- Train operators: Trenitalia
- Connections: Suburban buses

Other information
- Classification: Silver

History
- Opened: 1853; 173 years ago

Services
Preceding station	Turin SFM	Following station
Savigliano towards Cirié	SFM7	Terminus
Location
- Location within Piedmont Location within Northern Italy Location within Italy

Fossano railway station (Italian: Stazione di Fossano) is the railway station serving the comune of Fossano, in the Piedmont region of northwestern Italy. It is the junction of the Turin–Savona and Fossano–Cuneo railways.

The station is managed by Rete Ferroviaria Italiana (RFI), while train services are operated by Trenitalia. Both companies are subsidiaries of Ferrovie dello Stato (FS), Italy's state-owned rail company.

== History ==
The station was opened on 15 December 1853, upon the inauguration of the track from Savigliano to Fossano of the Turin–Savona railway.

== Features ==
Seven tracks of which are equipped with platforms, pass through the station.

== Train services ==
The station is served by the following services:

- Express services (Regionale veloce) Turin - Fossano - San Giuseppe di Cairo – Savona
- Express services (Regionale veloce) Fossano - Cuneo
- Regional services (Treno regionale) Fossano - San Giuseppe di Cairo
- Regional services (Treno regionale) Fossano - Limone
- Turin Metropolitan services (SFM7) Fossano - Turin

== See also ==
- History of rail transport in Italy
- List of railway stations in Piedmont
- Rail transport in Italy
- Railway stations in Italy
