= Sant'Antonino–Vaie railway station =

Railway station in Italy

S.Antonino Vaie
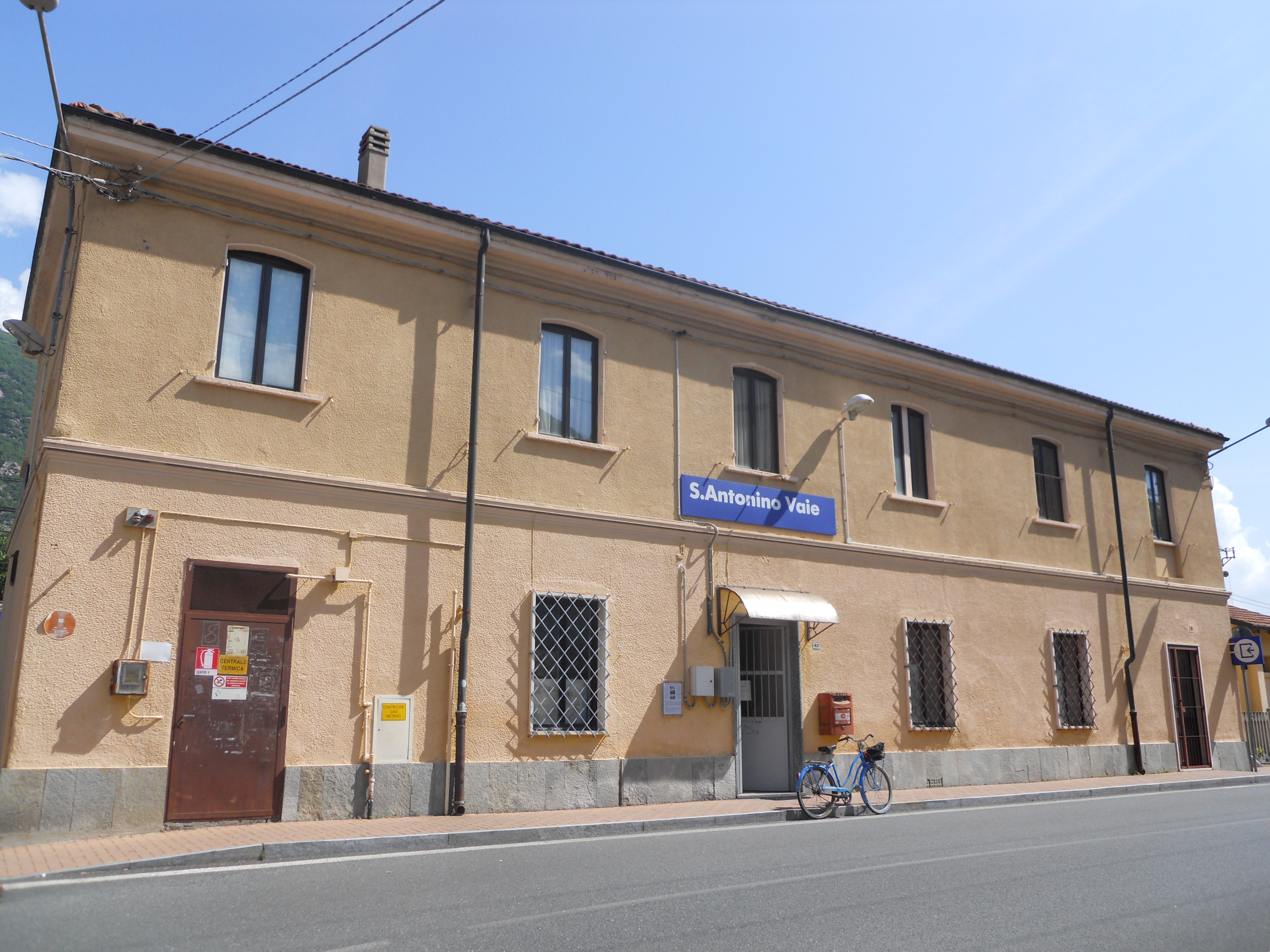
- Sant'Antonino-Vaie railway station

General information
- Location: Via Roma, 65, Sant'Antonino di Susa; Sant'Antonino di Susa, Metropolitan City of Turin, Piedmont; Italy
- Coordinates: 45°6′34″N 7°16′30″E
- Owner: Rete Ferroviaria Italiana
- Operator: Rete Ferroviaria Italiana
- Line: Turin-Modane railway
- Platforms: 2
- Tracks: 2
- Train operators: Trenitalia

Other information
- Classification: Silver

Services
| Preceding station | Turin SFM | Following station |
|---|---|---|
| Bussoleno towards Bardonecchia or Susa | SFM3 | Avigliana towards Torino Porta Nuova |
| Borgone towards Susa | SFM3 | Condove-Chiusa San Michele towards Torino Porta Nuova |
Location
- Location within Piedmont Location within Northern Italy Location within Italy

Sant'Antonino–Vaie (Italian: Stazione di Sant'Antonino–Vaie) is a railway station in Sant'Antonino di Susa, Italy. The station is located on the Turin-Modane railway. The train services are operated by Trenitalia.

== Train services ==
The station is served by the following services:

- Turin Metropolitan services (SFM3) Bardonecchia – Bussoleno – Turin
- Turin Metropolitan services (SFM3) Susa – Bussoleno – Turin
