= Alpignano railway station =

Railway station in Italy

Alpignano
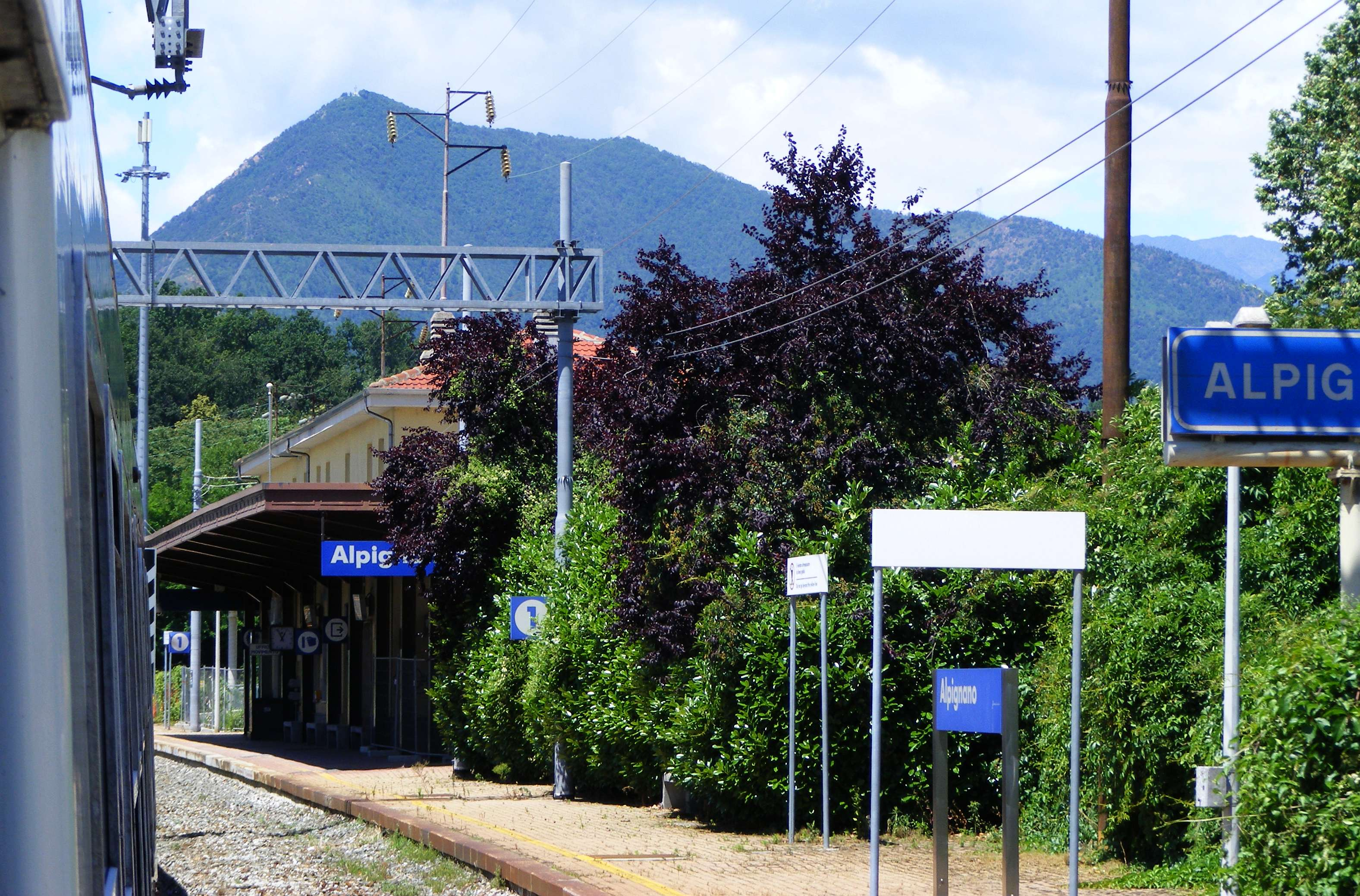
- The station (in the background the mount Musinè)

General information
- Location: Viale Vittoria 1, Alpignano; Alpignano, Metropolitan City of Turin, Piedmont; Italy
- Coordinates: 45°05′29″N 07°31′26″E
- Owner: Rete Ferroviaria Italiana
- Operator: Rete Ferroviaria Italiana
- Line: Turin – Modane
- Platforms: 2
- Tracks: 2
- Train operators: Trenitalia

Other information
- Classification: Silver

Services
Preceding station	Turin SFM	Following station
Rosta towards Bardonecchia or Susa	SFM3	Collegno towards Torino Porta Nuova
Location
- Location within Piedmont Location within Northern Italy Location within Italy

Alpignano railway station (Italian: Stazione di Alpignano) serves the town and comune of Alpignano, in the Piedmont region of northwestern Italy. The station is located on the Turin-Modane railway. The train services are operated by Trenitalia.

== Train services ==
The station is served by the following services:

- Turin Metropolitan services (SFM3) Bardonecchia - Bussoleno - Turin
- Turin Metropolitan services (SFM3) Susa - Bussoleno - Turin
