= Sant'Ambrogio railway station =

Railway station in Sant'Ambrogio di Torino, Italy

S.Ambrogio
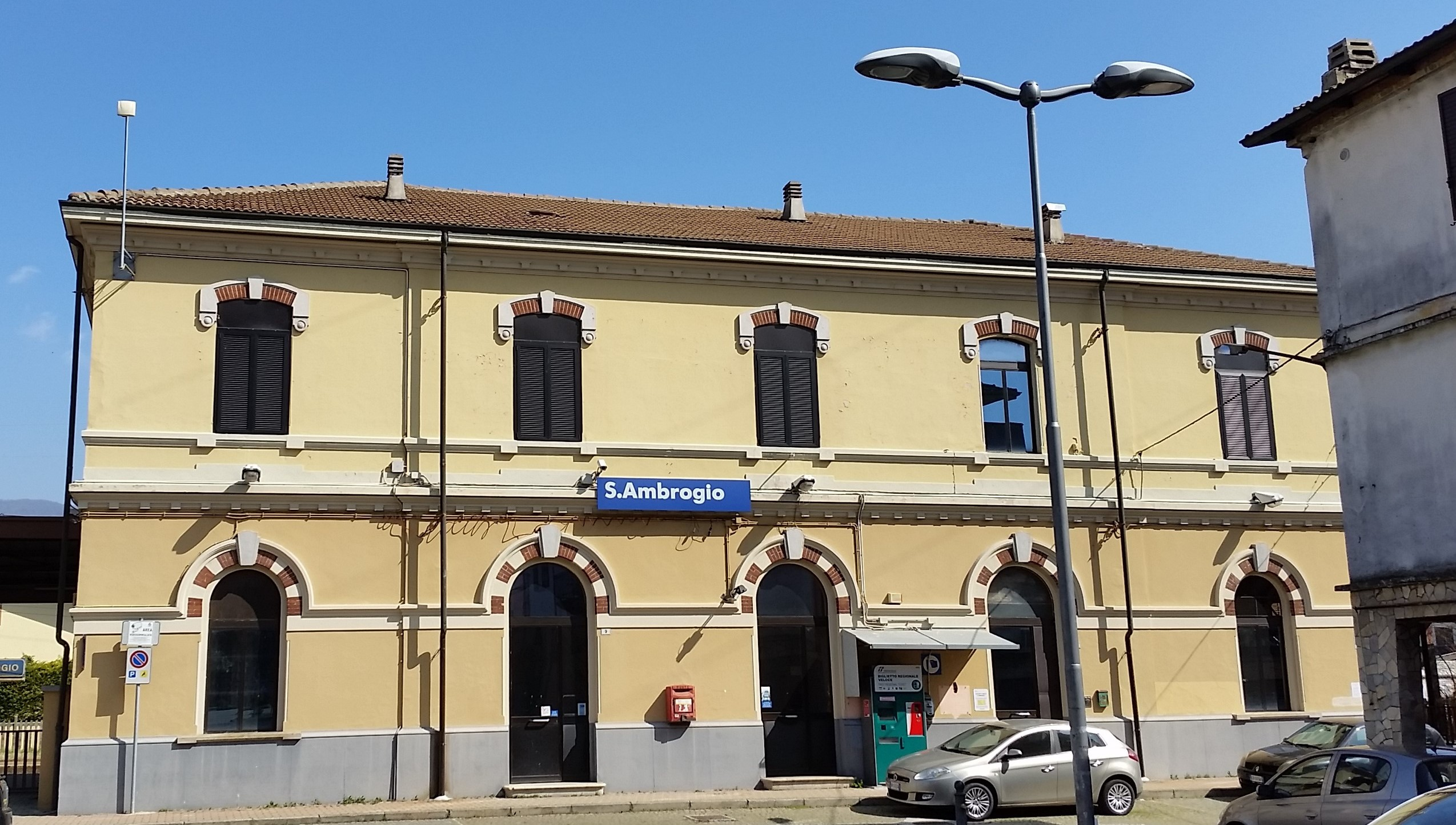
- Sant'Ambrogio railway station

General information
- Location: Piazza della Stazione, 5, Sant'Ambrogio di Torino; Sant'Ambrogio di Torino, Metropolitan City of Turin, Piedmont; Italy
- Coordinates: 45°6′4″N 7°21′40″E
- Owner: Rete Ferroviaria Italiana
- Operator: Rete Ferroviaria Italiana
- Line: Turin-Modane railway
- Platforms: 2
- Tracks: 2
- Train operators: Trenitalia

Other information
- Classification: Silver

History
- Opened: 1863; 163 years ago

Services
Preceding station	Turin SFM	Following station
Condove-Chiusa San Michele towards Bardonecchia or Susa	SFM3	Avigliana towards Torino Porta Nuova
Condove-Chiusa San Michele towards Susa	SFM3	Avigliana towards Torino Porta Nuova
Location
- Location within Piedmont Location within Northern Italy Location within Italy

Sant'Ambrogio (Italian: Stazione di Sant'Ambrogio) is a railway station in Sant'Ambrogio di Torino. The station is located on the Turin-Modane railway. The train services are operated by Trenitalia.

== Train services ==
The station is served by the following services:

- Turin Metropolitan services (SFM3) Bardonecchia - Bussoleno - Turin
- Turin Metropolitan services (SFM3) Susa - Bussoleno - Turin
