= Borgone railway station =

Railway station in Borgone Susa, Piedmont, Italy

Borgone
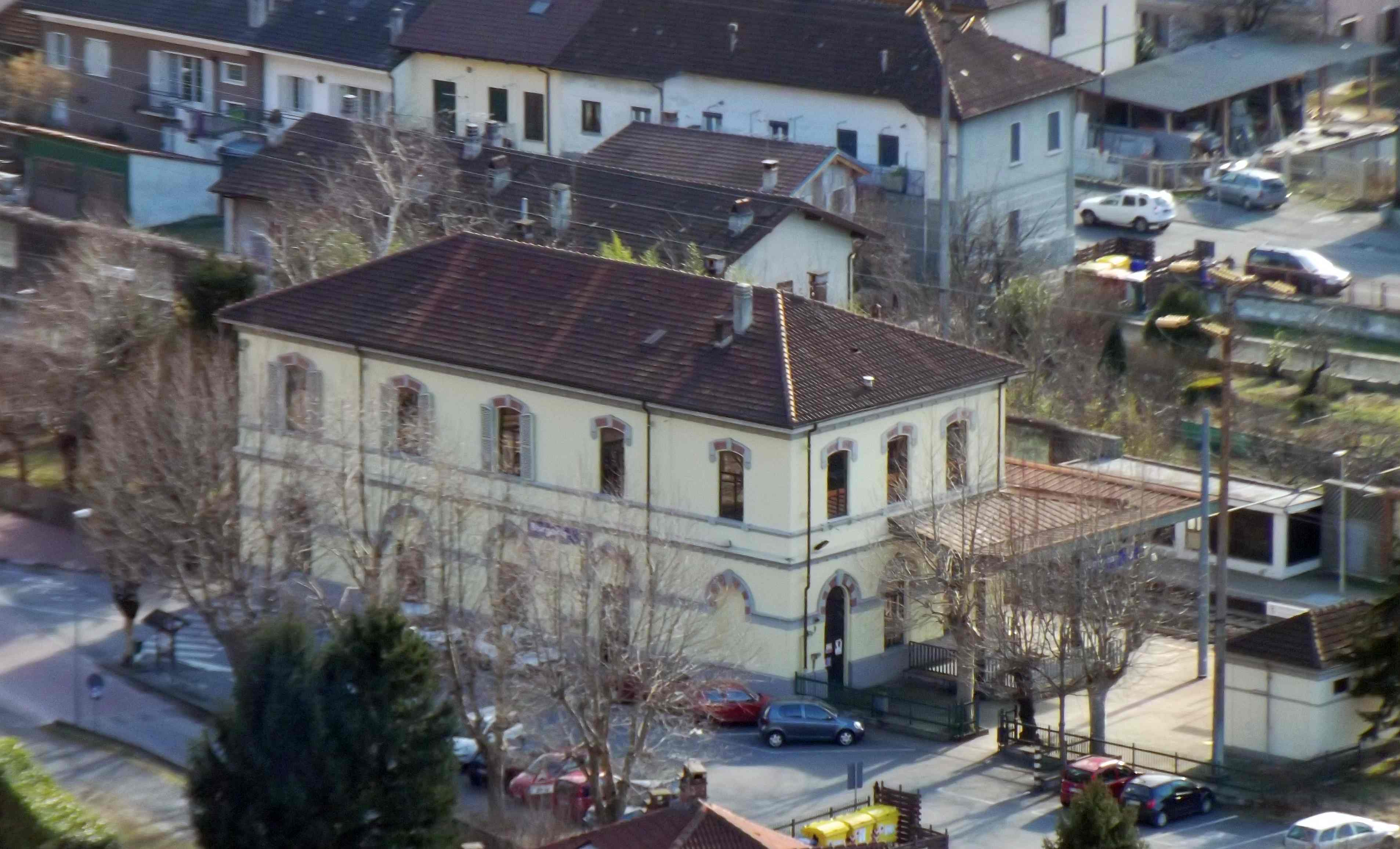
- Borgone railway station

General information
- Location: Via Tacca, 3, Borgone Susa, Metropolitan City of Turin, Piedmont; Italy
- Coordinates: 45°7′26″N 7°14′12″E
- Owner: Rete Ferroviaria Italiana
- Operator: Rete Ferroviaria Italiana
- Line: Turin-Modane railway
- Platforms: 2
- Tracks: 2
- Train operators: Trenitalia

Other information
- Classification: Silver

Services
| Preceding station | Turin SFM | Following station |
|---|---|---|
| Condove-Chiusa San Michele towards Bardonecchia or Susa | SFM3 | Avigliana towards Torino Porta Nuova |
Location
- Location within Piedmont Location within Northern Italy Location within Italy

Borgone (Italian: Stazione di Borgone) is a railway station in Borgone Susa in the Italian region Piedmont. The station is located on the Turin-Modane railway. The train services are operated by Trenitalia.

== Train services ==
The station is served by the following services:

- Turin Metropolitan services (SFM3) Bardonecchia - Bussoleno - Turin
- Turin Metropolitan services (SFM3) Susa - Bussoleno - Turin
