= Bruzolo di Susa railway station =

Railway station in Italy

Bruzolo
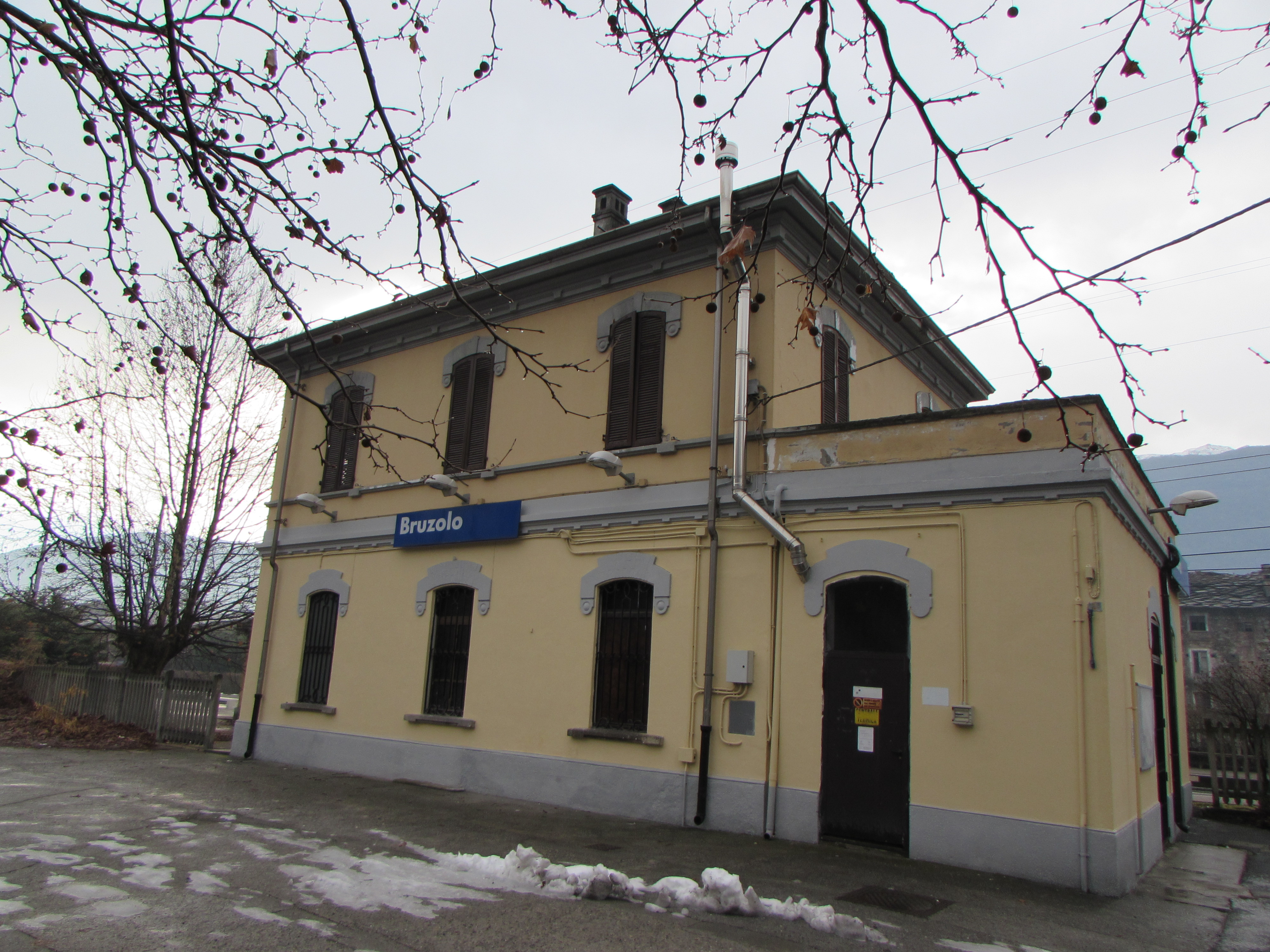
- Bruzolo di Susa railway station

General information
- Location: Viale Stazione, 4, Bruzolo, Metropolitan City of Turin, Piedmont; Italy
- Coordinates: 45°7′52″N 7°12′02″E
- Owner: Rete Ferroviaria Italiana
- Operator: Rete Ferroviaria Italiana
- Line: Turin-Modane railway
- Platforms: 2
- Tracks: 2
- Train operators: Trenitalia

Other information
- Classification: Bronze

Services
Preceding station	Turin SFM	Following station
Bussoleno towards Bardonecchia or Susa	SFM3	Borgone towards Torino Porta Nuova
Location
- Location within Piedmont Location within Northern Italy Location within Italy

Bruzolo di Susa (Italian: Stazione di Bruzolo) is a railway station in Bruzolo, in the Italian region of Piedmont. The station is located on the Turin-Modane railway. The train services are operated by Trenitalia.

== Train services ==
The station is served by the following services:

- Turin Metropolitan services (SFM3) Bardonecchia - Bussoleno - Turin
- Turin Metropolitan services (SFM3) Susa - Bussoleno - Turin
