= Grugliasco railway station =

Railway station in Italy

Grugliasco
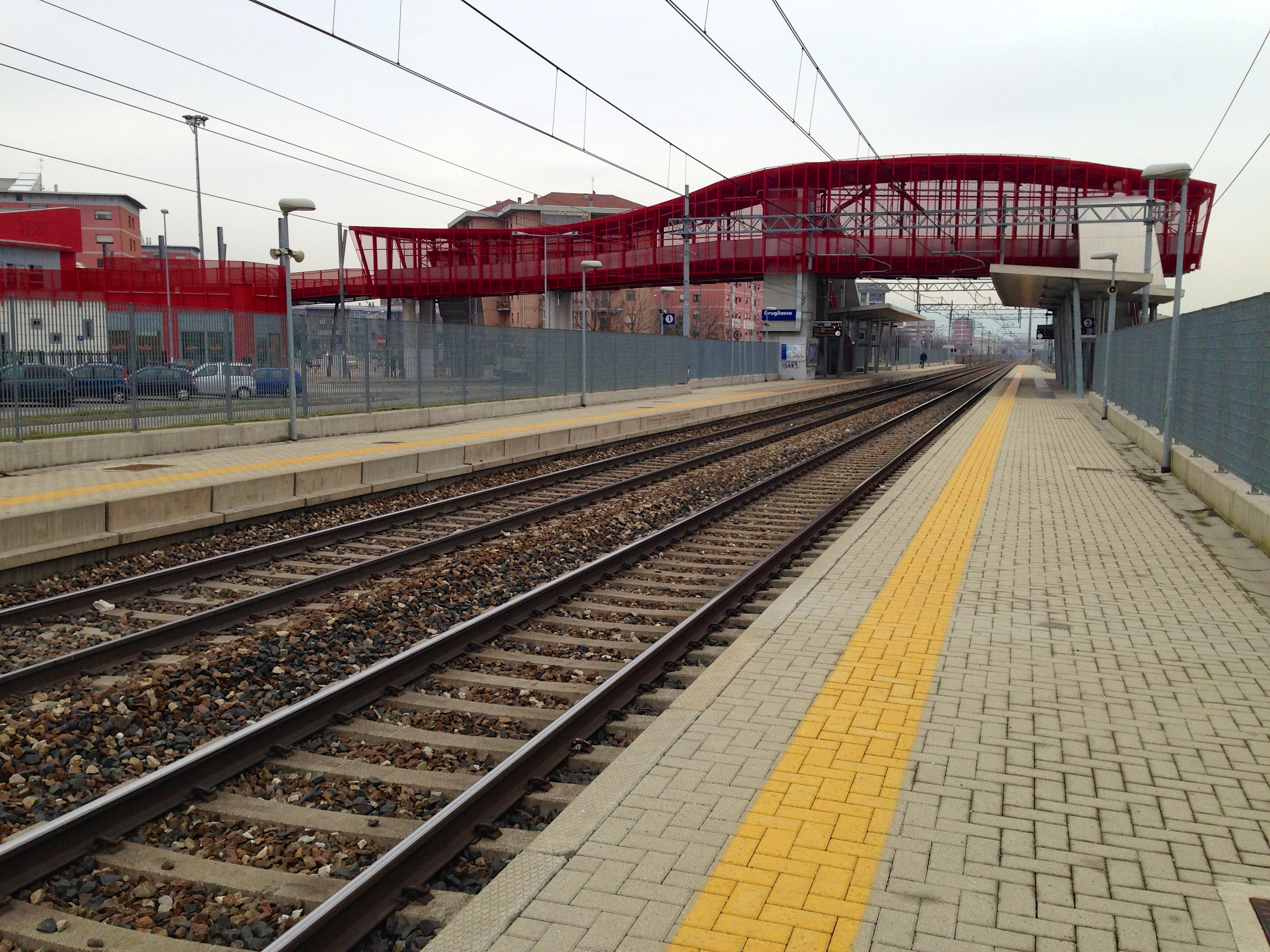
- Grugliasco railway station

General information
- Location: C.so Adriatico, Grugliasco; Grugliasco, Metropolitan City of Turin, Piedmont; Italy
- Coordinates: 45°04′05″N 7°35′56″E
- Owner: Rete Ferroviaria Italiana
- Operator: Rete Ferroviaria Italiana
- Line: Turin-Modane railway
- Platforms: 2
- Tracks: 2
- Train operators: Trenitalia

Other information
- Classification: Silver

History
- Opened: 13 December 2011; 14 years ago

Services
Preceding station	Turin SFM	Following station
Collegno towards Bardonecchia or Susa	SFM3	Torino Porta Nuova Terminus
Location
- Location within Piedmont Location within Northern Italy Location within Italy

Grugliasco (Italian: Stazione di Grugliasco) is a railway station in Grugliasco, in the Italian region of Piedmont. The station is located on the Turin-Modane railway. The train services are operated by Trenitalia.

== Train services ==
The station is served by the following services:

- Turin Metropolitan services (SFM3) Bardonecchia - Bussoleno - Turin
- Turin Metropolitan services (SFM3) Susa - Bussoleno - Turin
