= Rosta railway station =

Railway station in Italy

Rosta
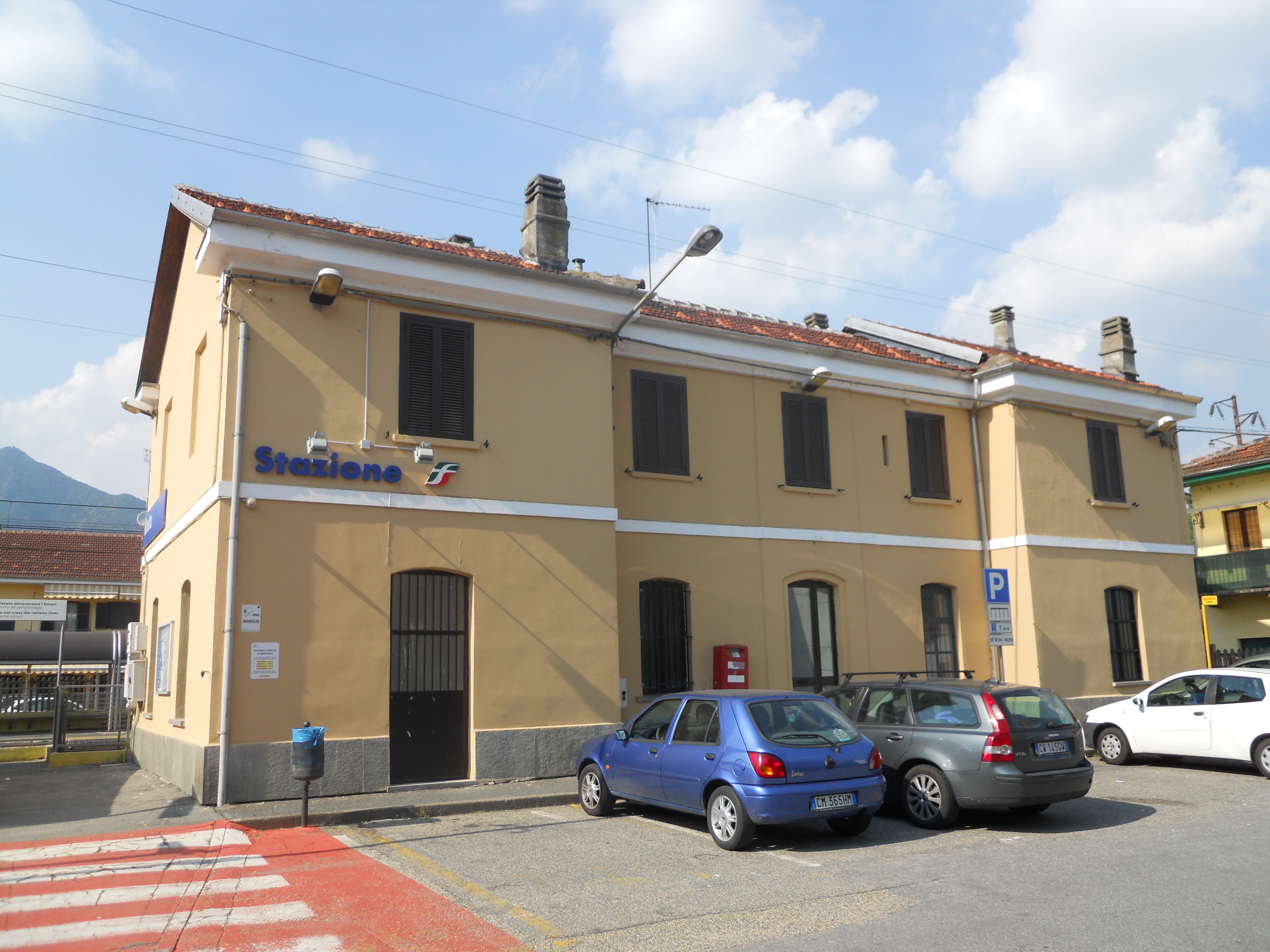
- Rosta railway station

General information
- Location: Via Stazione, 92, Rosta; Rosta, Metropolitan City of Turin, Piedmont; Italy
- Coordinates: 45°04′41″N 7°27′41″E
- Owner: Rete Ferroviaria Italiana
- Operator: Rete Ferroviaria Italiana
- Line: Turin-Modane railway
- Platforms: 2
- Tracks: 2
- Train operators: Trenitalia

Other information
- Classification: Silver

History
- Opened: 1 June 1908; 118 years ago

Services
Preceding station	Turin SFM	Following station
Avigliana towards Bardonecchia or Susa	SFM3	Alpignano towards Torino Porta Nuova
Location
- Location within Piedmont Location within Northern Italy Location within Italy

Rosta (Italian: Stazione di Rosta) is a railway station in the comune of Rosta, in the Italian region of Piedmont. The station is located on the Turin-Modane railway. The train services are operated by Trenitalia.

== Train services ==
The station is served by the following services:

- Turin Metropolitan services (SFM3) Bardonecchia - Bussoleno - Turin
- Turin Metropolitan services (SFM3) Susa - Bussoleno - Turin
