= Collegno railway station =

Railway station in Piedmont, Italy

Collegno
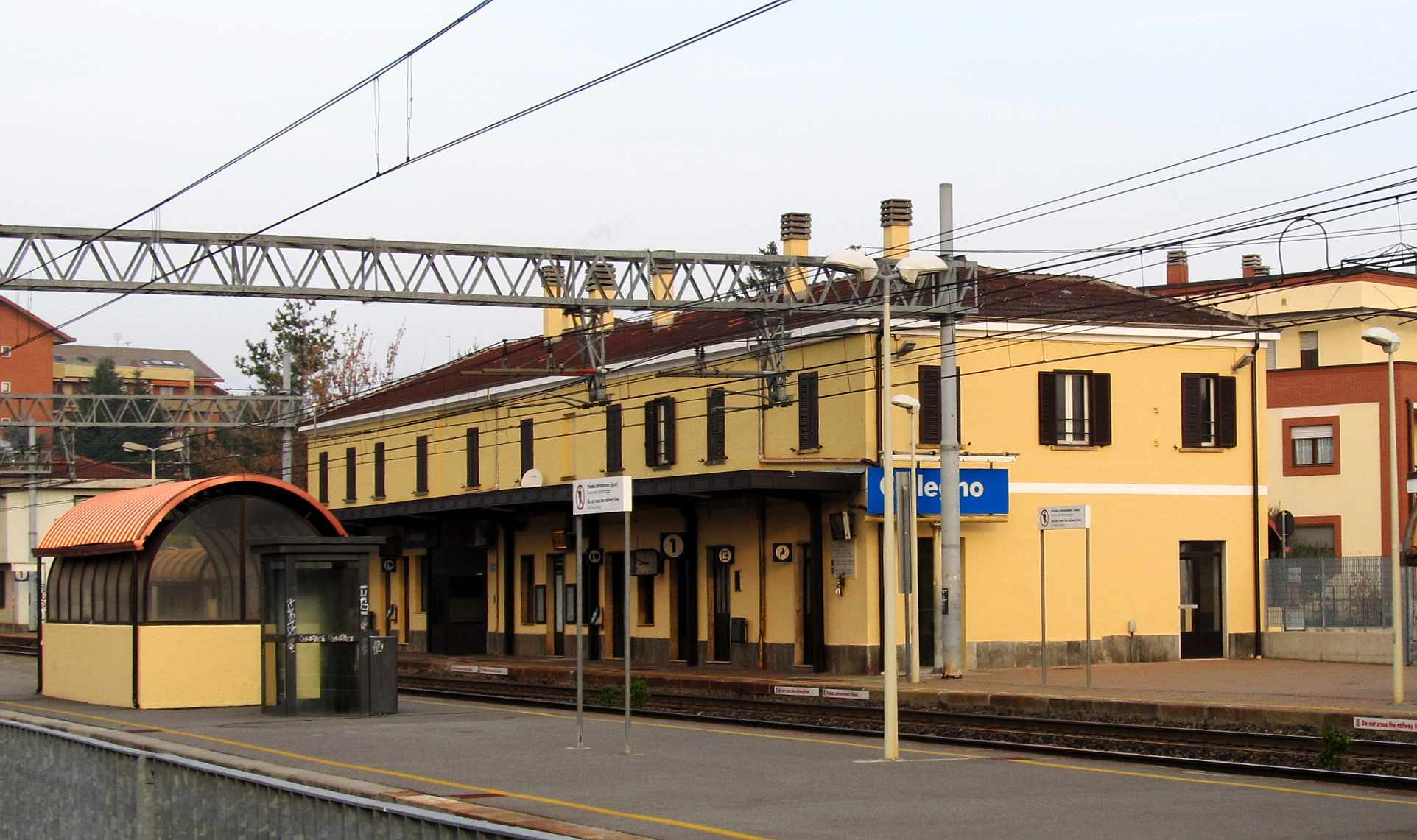
- Collegno railway station

General information
- Location: Via G. Collegno, 1, Collegno; Collegno, Metropolitan City of Turin, Piedmont; Italy
- Coordinates: 45°04′43″N 7°34′27″E
- Owner: Rete Ferroviaria Italiana
- Operator: Rete Ferroviaria Italiana
- Line: Turin-Modane railway
- Platforms: 3
- Tracks: 3
- Train operators: Trenitalia

Other information
- Classification: Silver

Services
Preceding station	Turin SFM	Following station
Alpignano towards Bardonecchia or Susa	SFM3	Grugliasco towards Torino Porta Nuova
Location
- Location within Piedmont Location within Northern Italy Location within Italy

Collegno (Italian: Stazione di Collegno) is a railway station in Collegno. The station is located on the Turin–Modane railway. The train services are operated by Trenitalia.

This station would serve as an interchange with the Turin Metro with the extension of Line 1 to Cascine Vica in 2023.

== Train services ==
The station is served by the following services:

- Turin Metropolitan services (SFM3) Bardonecchia - Bussoleno - Turin
- Turin Metropolitan services (SFM3) Susa - Bussoleno - Turin
