= Salbertrand railway station =

Railway station in Italy

Salbertrand

General information
- Location: Via Stazione 14, Salbertrand; Salbertrand, Metropolitan City of Turin, Piedmont; Italy
- Coordinates: 45°04′25″N 6°53′16″E
- Owner: Rete Ferroviaria Italiana
- Operator: Rete Ferroviaria Italiana
- Line: Turin-Modane
- Train operators: Trenitalia

Other information
- Classification: Bronze

History
- Opened: 16 October 1871; 154 years ago

Services
Preceding station	Turin SFM	Following station
Oulx-Cesana-Claviere-Sestriere towards Bardonecchia	SFM3	Chiomonte towards Torino Porta Nuova
Location
- Location within Piedmont Location within Northern Italy Location within Italy

Salbertrand (Italian: Stazione di Salbertrand) is a railway station in Salbertrand. The station opened on 16 October 1871. It is located along the Turin-Modane railway. Train services running through the station are operated by Trenitalia.

== Train services ==
The station is served by the following services:

- Turin Metropolitan services (SFM3) Bardonecchia - Bussoleno - Turin
