= Meana railway station =

Railway station in Meana di Susa, Italy

Meana

General information
- Location: Via Pian Barale, 9, Meana; Meana di Susa, Metropolitan City of Turin, Piedmont; Italy
- Coordinates: 45°07′28″N 7°03′35″E
- Owner: Rete Ferroviaria Italiana
- Operator: Rete Ferroviaria Italiana
- Line: Turin-Modane railway
- Train operators: Trenitalia

Other information
- Classification: Bronze

Services
Preceding station	Turin SFM	Following station
Chiomonte towards Bardonecchia	SFM3	Bussoleno towards Torino Porta Nuova
Location
- Location within Piedmont Location within Northern Italy Location within Italy

Meana (Italian: Stazione di Meana) is a railway station in the Meana di Susa comune (municipality) in the Italian region of Piedmont. The station is located on the Turin-Modane railway. The train services are operated by Trenitalia.

== Train services ==
The station is served by the following services:

- Turin Metropolitan services (SFM3) Bardonecchia - Bussoleno - Turin
