= Condove–Chiusa San Michele railway station =

Railway station in Piedmont, Italy

Condove–Chiusa S.Michele
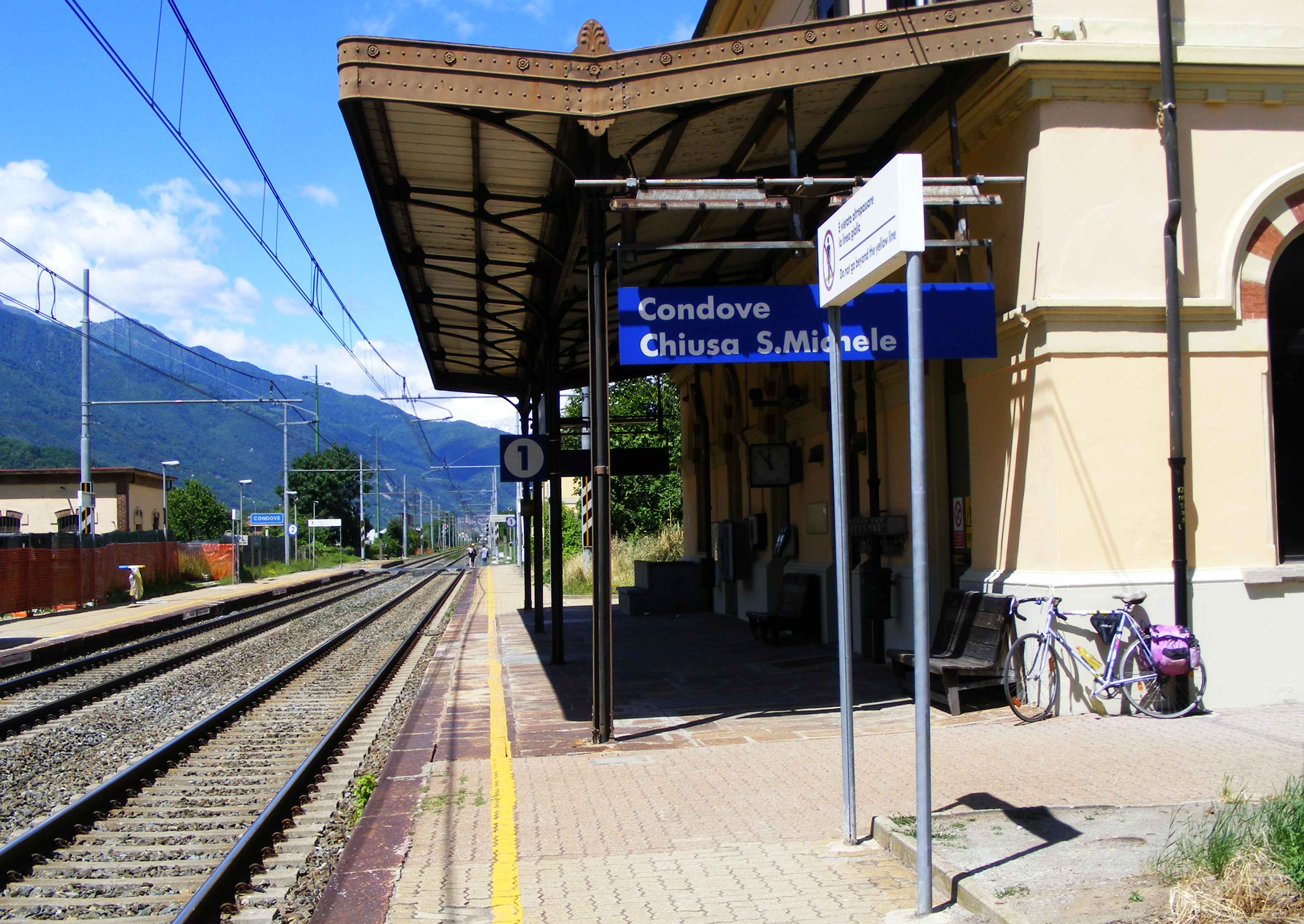
- Condove-Chiusa San Michele railway station

General information
- Location: Via Stazione, 4, Chiusa San Michele, Metropolitan City of Turin, Piedmont
- Coordinates: 45°6′24″N 7°19′00″E
- Owner: Rete Ferroviaria Italiana
- Operator: Rete Ferroviaria Italiana
- Line: Turin–Modane railway
- Platforms: 2
- Tracks: 2
- Train operators: Trenitalia

Other information
- Classification: Silver

Services
Preceding station	Turin SFM	Following station
Sant'Antonino-Vaie towards Bardonecchia or Susa	SFM3	Sant'Ambrogio towards Torino Porta Nuova
Location
- Location within Piedmont Location within Northern Italy Location within Italy

Condove–Chiusa San Michele (Italian: Stazione di Condove–Chiusa San Michele) is a railway station in Italy's Chiusa San Michele comune (municipality) and serving the Condove comune.

The station is located on the Turin–Modane railway. The train services are operated by Trenitalia.

== Train services ==
The station is served by the following services:

- Turin Metropolitan services (SFM3) Bardonecchia - Bussoleno - Turin
- Turin Metropolitan services (SFM3) Susa - Bussoleno - Turin
