= Chiomonte railway station =

Railway station in Italy

Chiomonte

General information
- Location: Via Stazione 11, Chiomonte; Chiomonte, Metropolitan City of Turin, Piedmont; Italy
- Coordinates: 45°07′12″N 6°59′19″E
- Owner: Rete Ferroviaria Italiana
- Operator: Rete Ferroviaria Italiana
- Line: Turin-Modane railway
- Train operators: Trenitalia

Other information
- Classification: Bronze

Services
Preceding station	Turin SFM	Following station
Salbertrand towards Bardonecchia	SFM3	Meana towards Torino Porta Nuova
Location
- Location within Piedmont Location within Northern Italy Location within Italy

Chiomonte (Italian: Stazione di Chiomonte) is a railway station in Chiomonte. The station is located on the Turin-Modane railway. Train services at the station are operated by Trenitalia.

== Train services ==
The station is served by Turin Metropolitan services (SFM3) Bardonecchia - Bussoleno - Turin.
