= Oulx–Cesana–Claviere–Sestriere railway station =

Railway station in Italy

Oulx–Cesana–Claviere–Sestriere
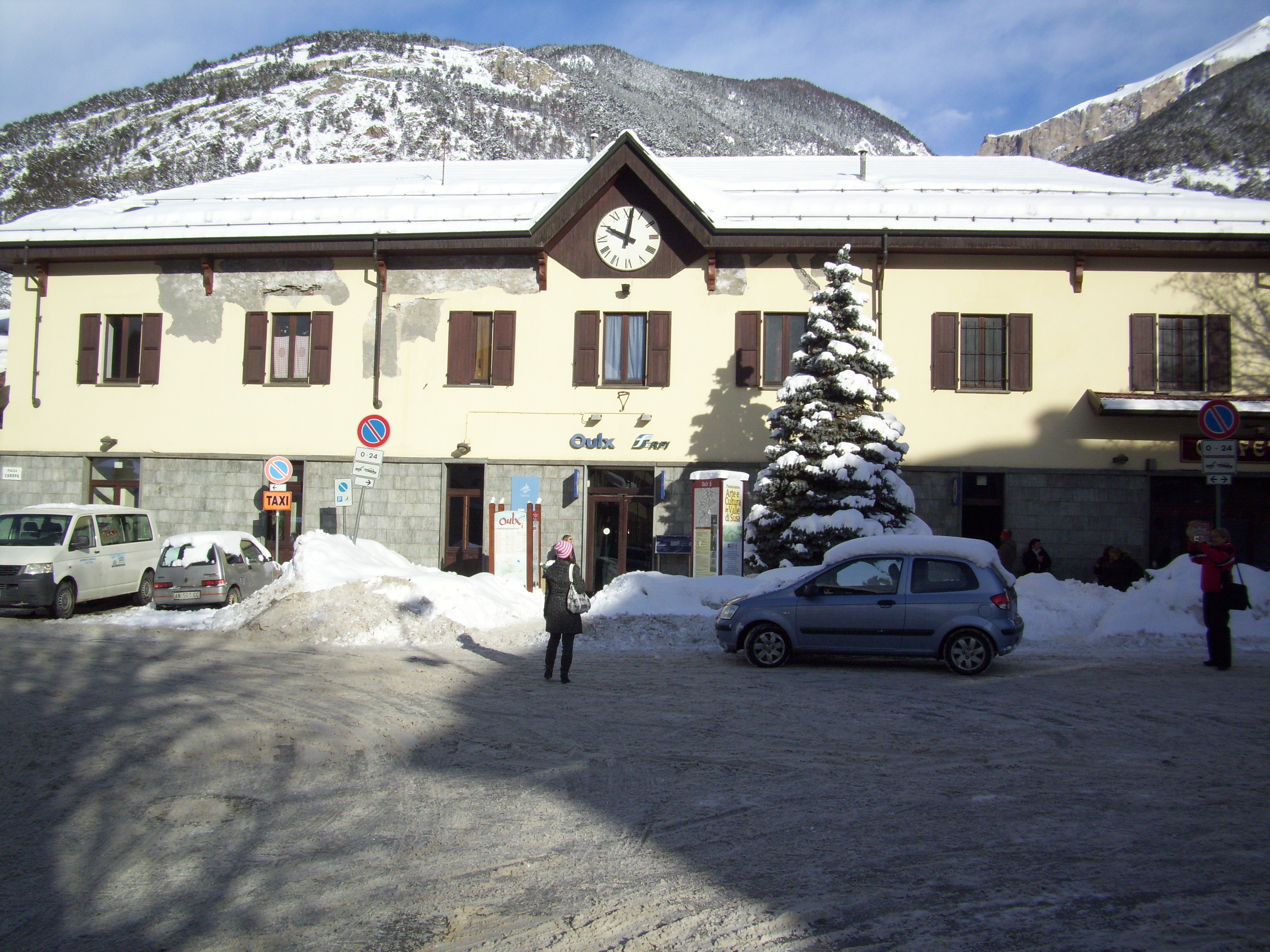
- Oulx-Cesana-Claviere-Sestriere railway station

General information
- Location: Piazza Europa 5, Oulx; Oulx, Metropolitan City of Turin, Piedmont; Italy
- Coordinates: 45°02′19″N 6°49′53″E
- Owner: Rete Ferroviaria Italiana
- Operator: Rete Ferroviaria Italiana
- Line: Turin–Modane
- Train operators: Trenitalia; SNCF

Other information
- Classification: Silver

Services
Preceding station	Trenitalia	Following station
Modane towards Paris-Lyon	Frecciarossa	Torino Porta Susa towards Milano Centrale
Preceding station	SNCF	Following station
Bardonecchia towards Paris-Lyon	TGV inOui	Torino Porta Susa towards Milan
Preceding station	Turin SFM	Following station
Beaulard towards Bardonecchia	SFM3	Salbertrand towards Torino Porta Nuova
Location
- Location within Piedmont Location within Northern Italy Location within Italy

Oulx–Cesana–Claviere–Sestriere (Italian: Stazione di Oulx) is a railway station in the Oulx comune (municipality) in the Italian region of Piedmont. The station is located on the Turin–Modane railway. The train services are operated by Trenitalia and SNCF.

== Train services ==
The station is served by the following services:

- High speed services (TGV & Frecciarossa) Paris – Lyon – Chambéry – Turin – Milan
- Turin Metropolitan services (SFM3) Bardonecchia – Bussoleno – Turin

== Bus services ==
- Bus to Briançon
- Bus to Sestriere
- Bus to Montgenevre
- Bus to Sauze
