= Avigliana railway station =

Railway station in Italy

Avigliana
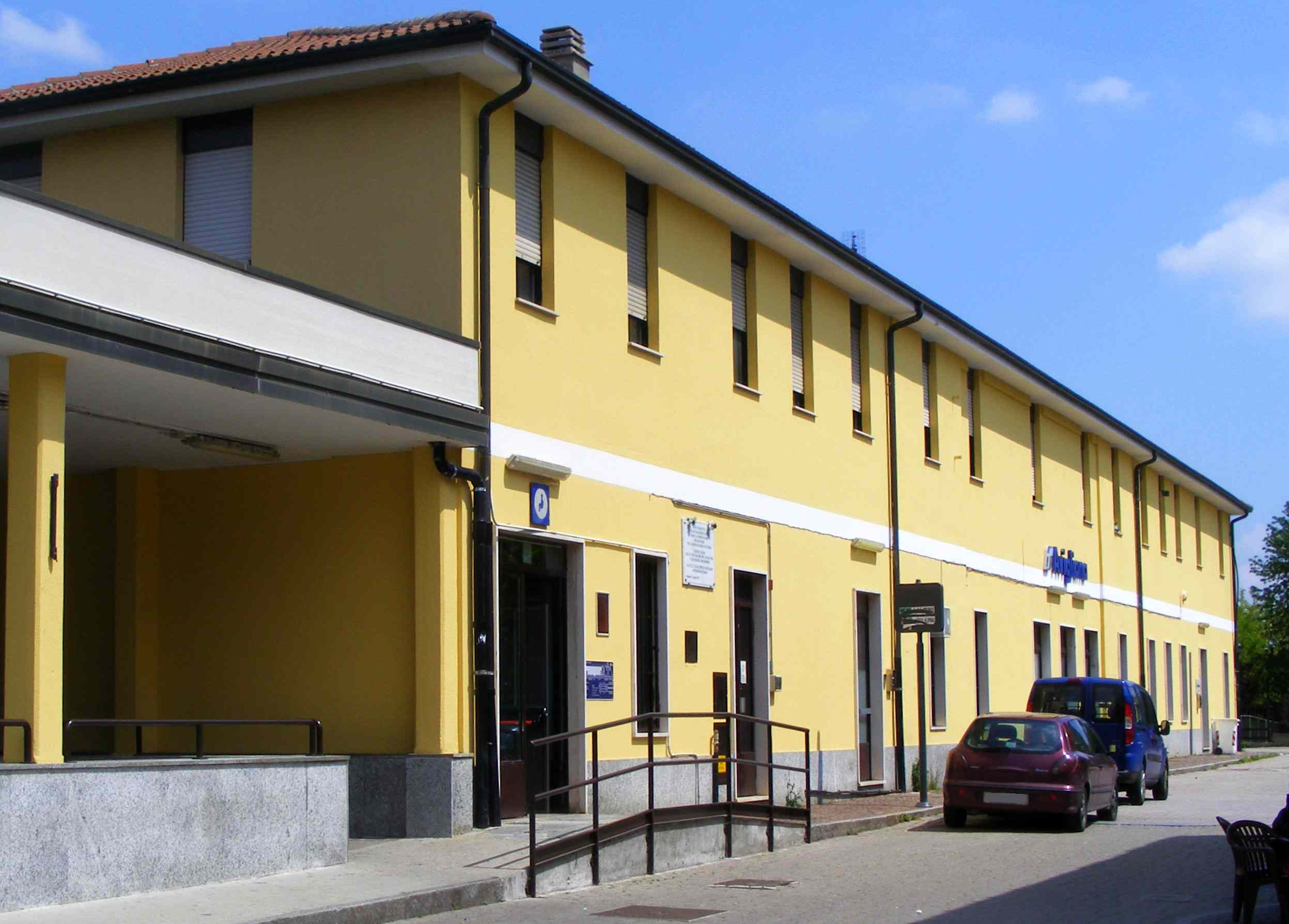

General information
- Location: Piazza Stazione 5, Avigliana; Avigliana, Metropolitan City of Turin, Piedmont; Italy
- Coordinates: 45°05′07″N 07°24′04″E
- Owner: Rete Ferroviaria Italiana
- Operator: Rete Ferroviaria Italiana
- Line: Turin-Modane
- Platforms: 3
- Tracks: 4
- Train operators: Trenitalia

Other information
- Classification: Silver

Services
Preceding station	Turin SFM	Following station
Sant'Antonino-Vaie towards Bardonecchia or Susa	SFM3	Rosta towards Torino Porta Nuova
Location
- Location within Piedmont Location within Northern Italy Location within Italy

Avigliana railway station (Italian: Stazione di Avigliana) serves the town and comune of Avigliana, in the Piedmont region of northwestern Italy. The station is located on the Turin-Modane railway. The train services are operated by Trenitalia.

== Train services ==
The station is served by the following services:

- Turin Metropolitan services (SFM3) Bardonecchia - Bussoleno - Turin
- Turin Metropolitan services (SFM3) Susa - Bussoleno - Turin
