= Beaulard railway station =

Railway station in Italy

Beaulard

General information
- Location: Beaulard, Metropolitan City of Turin, Piedmont; Italy
- Coordinates: 45°02′47″N 6°45′37″E
- Owner: Rete Ferroviaria Italiana
- Operator: Rete Ferroviaria Italiana
- Line: Turin-Modane
- Train operators: Trenitalia

Other information
- Classification: Bronze

Services
Preceding station	Turin SFM	Following station
Bardonecchia Terminus	SFM3	Oulx-Cesana-Claviere-Sestriere towards Torino Porta Nuova
Location
- Location within Piedmont Location within Northern Italy Location within Italy

Beaulard (Italian: Stazione di Beaulard) is a railway station in Beaulard, Piedmont, in Turin (Torino), Italy. The station is located on the Turin-Modane railway and the train services are operated by Trenitalia.

== Train services ==
The station is served by the following services:

- Turin Metropolitan services (SFM3) Bardonecchia - Bussoleno - Turin
