= Bussoleno railway station =

Railway station in Bussoleno, Italy

Bussoleno
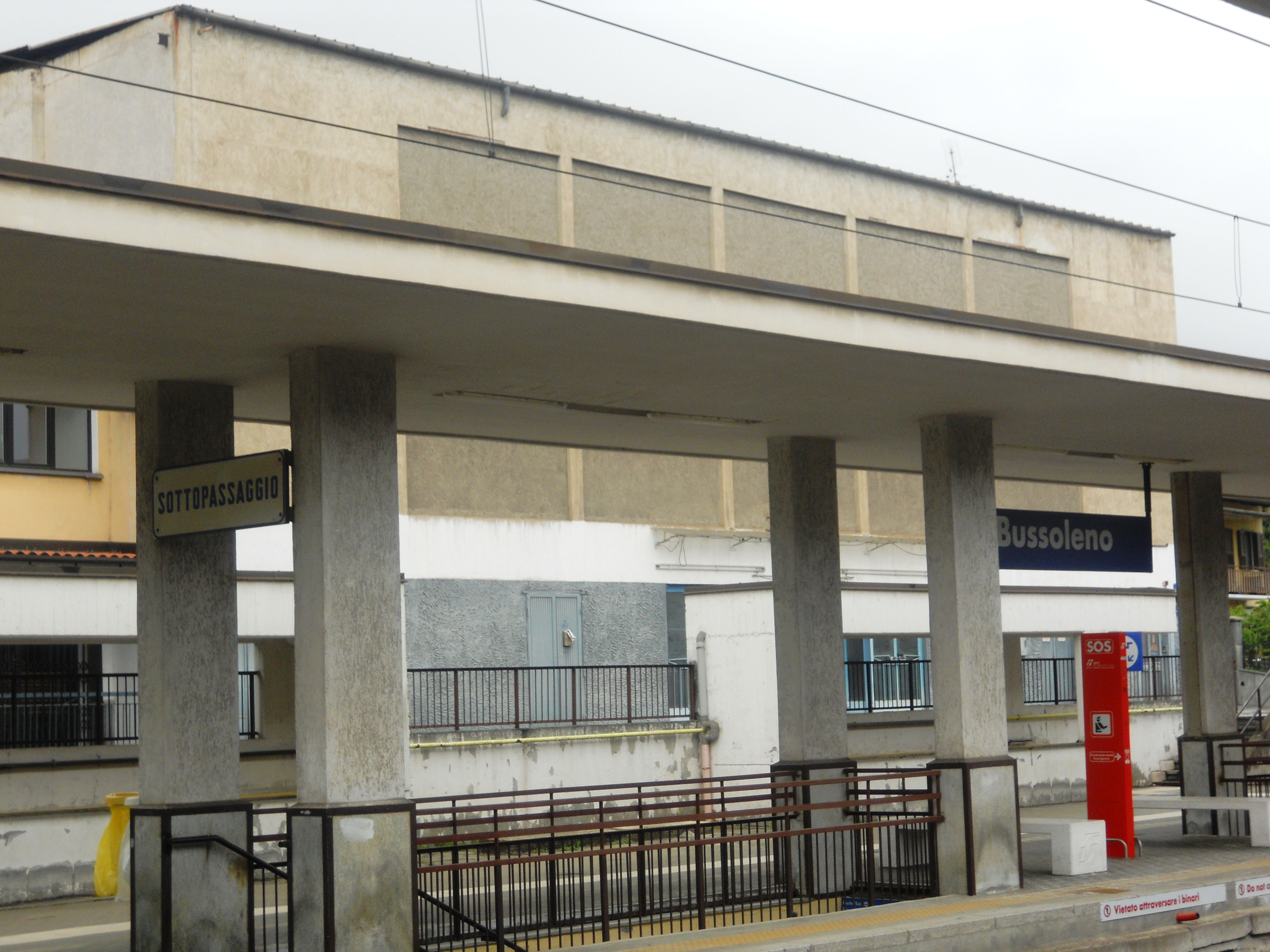
- Bussoleno railway station

General information
- Location: Strada Susa, 2A, Bussoleno; Bussoleno, Metropolitan City of Turin, Piedmont; Italy
- Coordinates: 45°08′24″N 7°08′39″E
- Owner: Rete Ferroviaria Italiana
- Operator: Rete Ferroviaria Italiana
- Line: Turin-Modane railway + Bussoleno-Susa branch
- Platforms: 4
- Tracks: 4
- Train operators: Trenitalia

Other information
- Classification: Silver

History
- Opened: 22 May 1854; 172 years ago

Services
Preceding station	Turin SFM	Following station
Meana towards Bardonecchia	SFM3	Bruzolo di Susa towards Torino Porta Nuova
Susa Terminus	SFM3	Bruzolo di Susa towards Torino Porta Nuova
Location
- Location within Piedmont Location within Northern Italy Location within Italy

Bussoleno (Italian: Stazione di Bussoleno) is a railway station in the Bussoleno comune (municipality) in the Italian region of Piedmont. The station is located on the Turin-Modane railway. The train services are operated by Trenitalia.

== Train services ==
The station is served by the following services:

- Turin Metropolitan services (SFM3) Bardonecchia - Bussoleno - Turin
- Turin Metropolitan services (SFM3) Susa - Bussoleno - Turin
