= Snow country (disambiguation) =

Snow Country is a 1948 novel by Kawabata Yasunari. Snow country or Snow Country may also refer to:

== Region ==
- Snow country (Japan) (豪雪地帯), a heavy snowfall zone in northern and western Japan
- Big snow country, a region in Michigan

== Art, entertainment, and media ==
- Snow Country (film) (雪国, Yukiguni), a 1957 Japanese film
- Snow stories of North Etsu Province or Snow Country Tales: Life in the other Japan (Japanese: Hokuetsu Seppu), a late Edo-period encyclopedic work of human geography describing life in the Uonuma area of Japan's old Echigo Province, by Jeffrey Hunter with Rose Lesser

== See also ==
- Snocountry
