= Rosta, Piedmont =

Rosta
- Comune
- Comune di Rosta
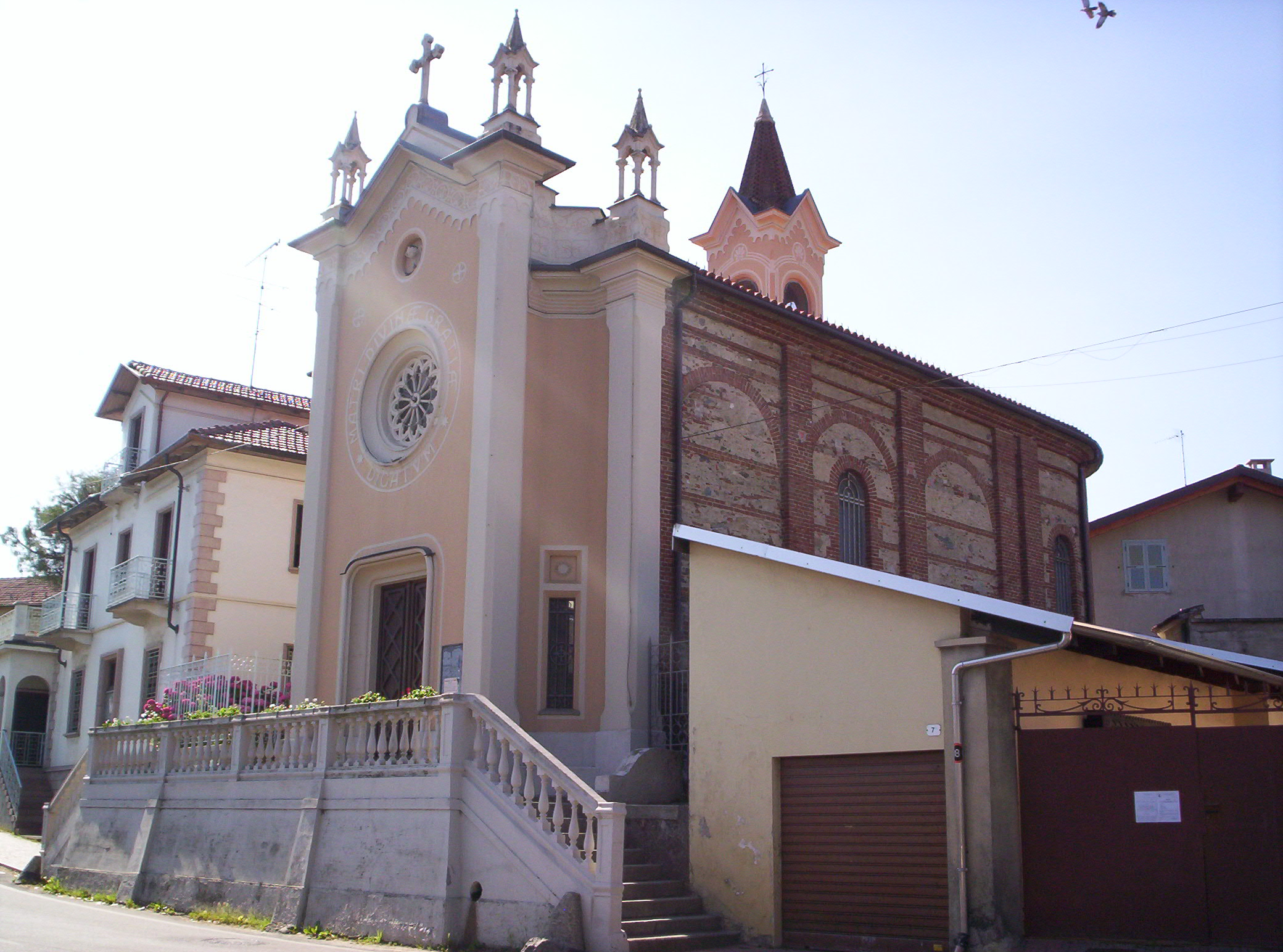

- Coat of arms

- Location within Italy Location within Piedmont
- Coordinates: 45°4′N 7°28′E
- Country: Italy
- Region: Piedmont
- Metropolitan city: Turin (TO)

Government
  - Mayor: Andrea Tragaioli

Area
  - Total: 9.0 km^{2} (3.5 sq mi)
- Elevation: 399 m (1,309 ft)

Population (30 September 2011)
  - Total: 4,685
  - Density: 520/km^{2} (1,300/sq mi)
- Demonym: Rostesi
- Time zone: UTC+1 (CET)
  - Summer (DST): UTC+2 (CEST)
- Postal code: 10090
- Dialing code: 011
- Patron saint: St. Michael Archangel
- Website: Official website

Rosta is a comune (municipality) in the Metropolitan City of Turin in the Italian region Piedmont, located about 20 kilometres (12 mi) west of Turin.

Sights include the Abbey of Sant'Antonio di Ranverso. It was part of the comune of Rivoli until 1694.

The comune is served by Rosta railway station on the Turin-Modane railway.

== Twin towns – sister cities ==
Rosta is twinned with:

- Bad Krozingen, Germany
- Bale, Croatia
- Bojnice, Slovakia
