= Turin railway station =

Turin railway station may refer to:

- Torino Lingotto railway station
- Torino Porta Nuova railway station, the main railway station in Turin, Italy
- Torino Porta Susa, the second busiest mainline station in the city

== See also ==
- List of railway stations in Turin
