= Vertical Challenge =

Series of downhill ski and snowboard races

The Vertical Challenge (VC) began in 1991 and is a series of free casual downhill ski and snowboard races held on mountains throughout the northeastern United States during the winter season. Participants are divided by skier/snowboarder, male/female, and age as they compete for gold, silver, and bronze medals in each category.

In addition to the races themselves, the event holds a concurrent festival. The crew play games with the attending families and the VC’s corporate partners offer samples, contests, and other elements designed to be of interest to the attendees and communicate the sponsors’ brand messages. A DJ plays music and makes announcements.

== Event description ==
On the day of the event, participants fill out registration forms to sign up for the race in a certain category and receive a numbered race bib. The first 100 registered racers receive a commemorative t-shirt. Registration begins at 7:30 AM.

From 11AM-1PM, skiers and snowboarders take their run down the racecourse. The designated trail is usually rated green (easier) or blue (more difficult) so racers of all abilities can participate. Usually there are two courses set up next to each other to keep the line moving quickly, but when there is not enough room, one course is used.

The racecourse closes at 1:30 PM. The results are tabulated for each category of racer so awards can be given out. Before this time, prizes are given away in a lodge at the mountain, or rarely outside if the weather is nice, during the "Vertical Victory Party." After the final tallies are made, medals are awarded.

=== Schedule ===
7:30AM: Registration begins 11AM-1PM: Race course is open 2:30PM: Vertical Victory Party and Awards 3:30PM: Event Concludes

== Awards ==
Awards are given to the top three racers in each category. Everybody who receives an award qualifies to go to the finals to race again at the end of the season. Pictures are usually taken of anybody who wins a medal.

=== Categories ===
Each age group is divided as follows into four different categories based on skier or snowboarder and male or female: age 6 and younger, age 7-9, age 10-12, age 13-14, age 15-17, age 18-25, age 26-35, age 36-45, age 46-55, age 56-65, age 66-70, age 71-75, and age 76 and older.

=== Special awards ===
A special award that is given to two different children at each event is the Dewey Bear. This is awarded based on which young child the Crew sees trying hard during the race, possibly falling, along with other qualitative aspects, such as cuteness or first time participating. The children who receive this award generally do not place high enough for a medal in their category unless there are not enough other competitors to beat them. The recipients qualify for the finals along with the medal winners during the season. In addition, anybody who has won a Dewey Bear during any season of the VC is eligible to go to the finals to enter into a drawing for a Mama and Papa Bear which are each six feet tall. Additionally, in 2007, Chewey Dog was added, carrying the same qualifications of Dewey. Therefore, at most events, only one Dewey is given away along with one Chewey.

Two other awards that are given separate from the medals are the skier and snowboarder trophies. These are a couple of carved, bronze-colored trophies with the appropriate athlete on them for who receives each one. While these used to be given away to the fastest skier and snowboarder, and sometimes still take that role, they have taken on almost the same qualifications as the Dewey Bears, with the exception that these can be given away to an older racer.

== Prizes ==
Many of the prizes given away are from the event sponsors’ companies. These include hats, t-shirts, sweatshirts, bags, skis, helmets, skis, and snowboards.

== Charity ==
The Vertical Challenge has traditionally made charitable contributions in two areas. The crew encourage young participants to return to their homes and raise money for the Make-A-Wish Foundation.

In addition, since 2014, the tour has worked with King Pine Resort and the Cynthia’s Challenge effort to raise funds each March to support children and their families through the ease of financial burden associated with specialty medical needs.

== Business aspects ==
The Vertical Challenge was originally known as the Mountain Dew Vertical Challenge in recognition of the beverage brand’s sponsor support. It has always been held at resorts that serve Pepsi products as part of that sponsor agreement. The name changed to the more generic “Vertical Challenge” in 2017, though Pepsi continued to be significantly involved in the tour.

In 2018, Vertical Challenge, LLC assumed ownership and operation of the tour from SnoCountry.

== Season schedule ==
The current schedule is available at www.ski-vc.com
