= Modane station =

Railway station in France

Modane
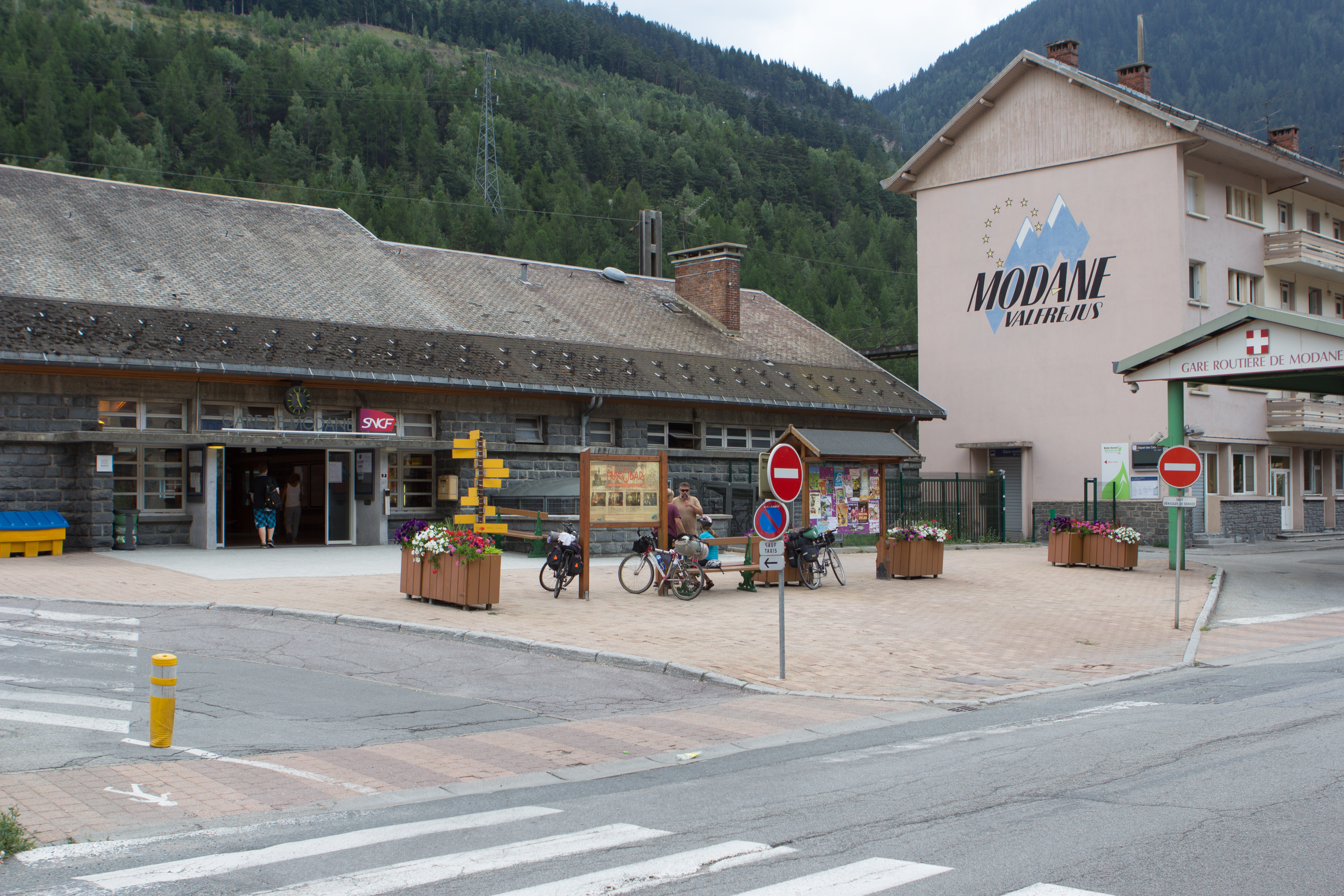
- Modane railway station

General information
- Location: Modane, Savoie, Rhône-Alpes, France
- Coordinates: 45°11′35″N 6°39′32″E
- Line: Culoz–Modane railway
- Platforms: 3

Other information
- Station code: 87742007

History
- Opened: 17 September 1871

Services
| Preceding station | SNCF | Following station |
|---|---|---|
| Saint-Jean-de-Maurienne towards Paris-Lyon | TGV inOui | Bardonecchia towards Milan |
| Preceding station | Trenitalia | Following station |
| Saint–Jean–de–Maurienne towards Paris-Lyon | Frecciarossa | Oulx–Cesana–Claviere–Sestriere towards Milano Centrale |
| Preceding station | TER Auvergne-Rhône-Alpes | Following station |
| Saint-Michel-Valloire towards Chambéry | 53 | Terminus |
Location

Modane is a railway station located in Modane, Savoie, France. The station was opened on 17 September 1871 and is located on the Culoz–Modane railway. The train services are operated by SNCF.

On 10 September 2017, Turin metropolitan railway service extended Line SFM3 to Modane. This service is only offered on Sundays and public holidays.

== Train services ==
The station is served by the following services:

- High speed services (TGV) Paris - Chambéry - Turin - Milan
- High speed services (TGV) Paris - Chambéry - Modane
- Regional services (TER Auvergne-Rhône-Alpes) Chambéry - Modane

The station is an intermediate stop on the Milan–Paris Frecciarossa operated by Trenitalia France.
