= Torino Porta Milano railway station =

Railway station in Turin, Italy

Coordinates: 45.0800°N 7.6854°E

Torino Porta Milano, also referred to as Torino Ponte Mosca or Cirié-Lanzo, was a railway station in Turin, northern Italy.

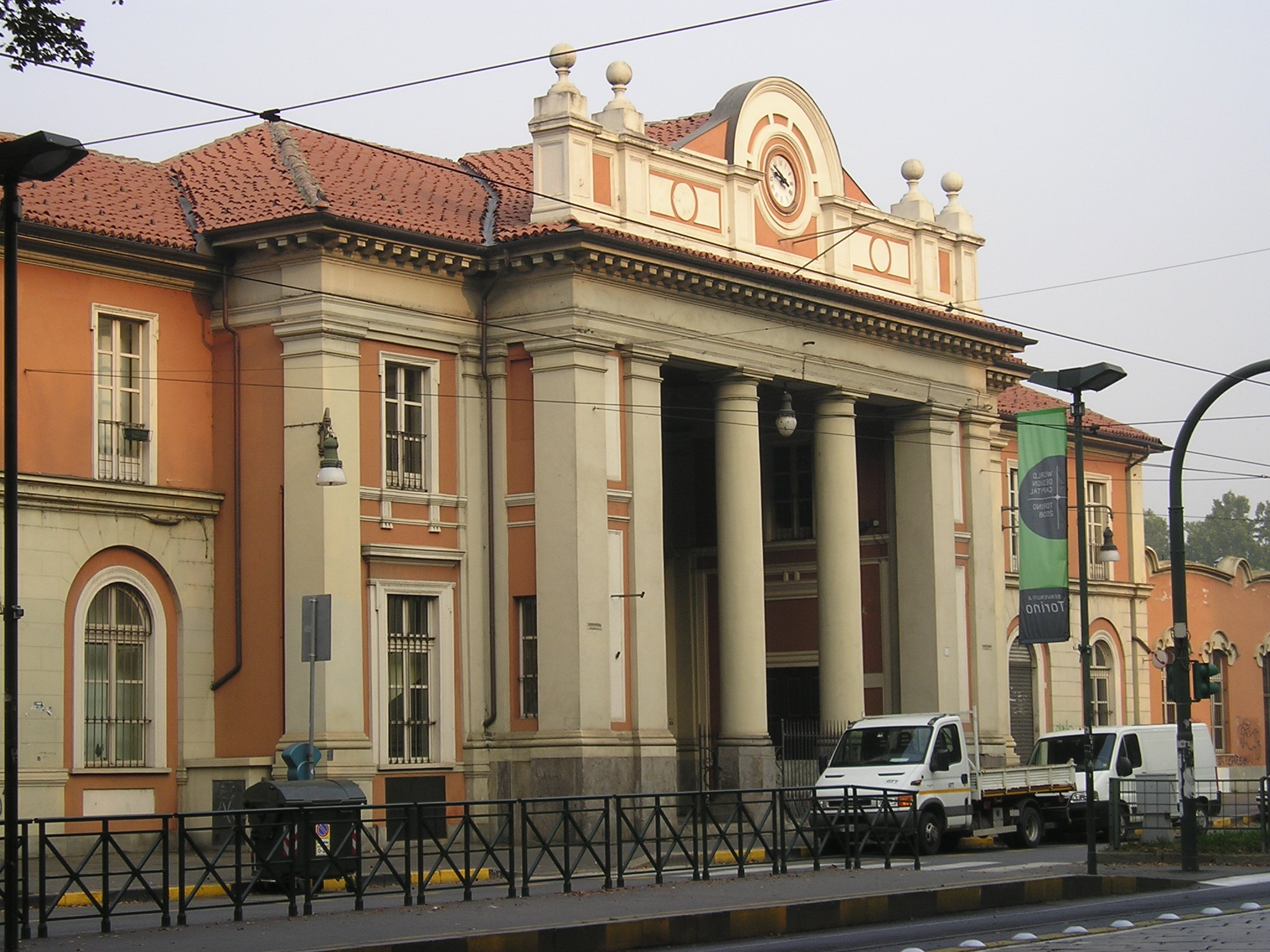
Facade, seen from Corso Giulio Cesare

It was the terminus station for the Turin-Ceres line. While unused today, the building can be found on Corso Giulio Cesare, in the Borgo Dora neighbourhood near the city's Porta Palazzo market.

== History ==
Torino Porta Milano was inaugurated on February 28, 1869, to serve travellers to the Lanzo Valleys. Trains also passed through the area of Venaria Reale and the Turin Airport. In 1986, work began to modernize the line which included plans to link with the passante ferroviaria, a tunnel passing underneath the city. The altered line now ends at Torino Dora station, rendering unusable the remaining the section which included Porta Milano. The station closed its doors in June 1986.

== See also ==
- Turin metropolitan railway service
