= Salbertrand =

- Comune
- Comune di Salbertrand
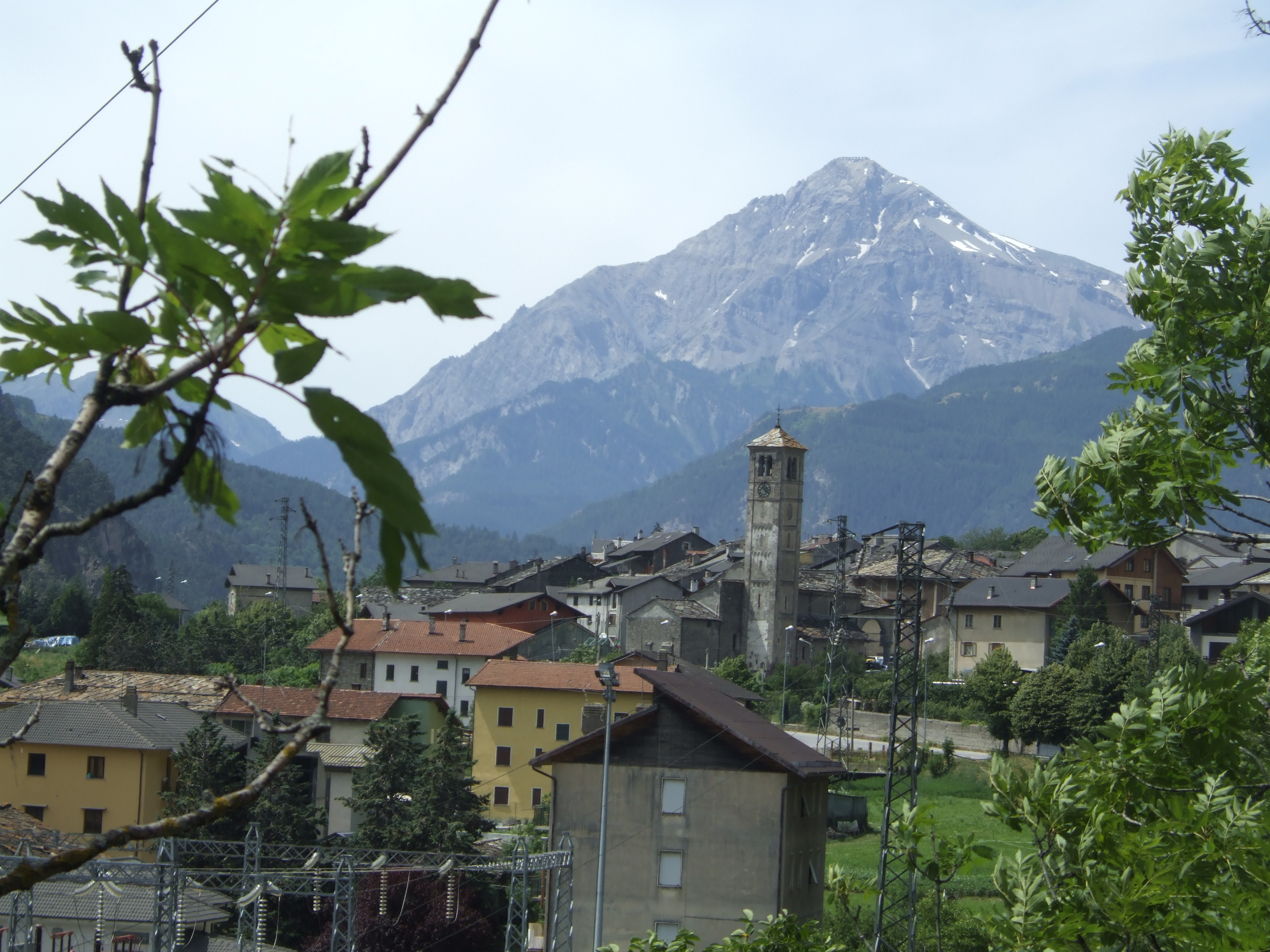

- Location within Italy Location within Piedmont
- Coordinates: 45°4′20″N 6°53′3″E
- Country: Italy
- Region: Piedmont
- Metropolitan city: Turin (TO)

Area
  - Total: 40.9 km^{2} (15.8 sq mi)
- Elevation: 1,032 m (3,386 ft)

Population (Dec. 2004)
  - Total: 522
  - Density: 12.8/km^{2} (33.1/sq mi)
- Demonym: Salbertrandesi
- Time zone: UTC+1 (CET)
  - Summer (DST): UTC+2 (CEST)
- Postal code: 10050
- Dialing code: 0122
- Website: Official website

Salbertrand (Occitan: Salberträn; Italian: Salabertano) is a comune (municipality) in the Metropolitan City of Turin in the Italian region Piedmont, about 60 km (37 mi) west of Turin. At 31 December 2004 it had a population of 522 and an area of 40.9 km^{2} (15.8 sq mi). It has a railway station on the Turin-Modane railway.

Salbertrand borders the following municipalities: Exilles, Oulx and Pragelato.

== Population history ==
Historical population

Year	Pop.	±%
1861	1,398	—
1871	1,383	−1.1%
1881	1,389	+0.4%
1901	1,172	−15.6%
1911	1,060	−9.6%

Year	Pop.	±%
1921	927	−12.5%
1931	804	−13.3%
1936	789	−1.9%
1951	707	−10.4%
1961	639	−9.6%

Year	Pop.	±%
1971	554	−13.3%
1981	460	−17.0%
1991	441	−4.1%
2001	466	+5.7%

Source: Data from ISTAT
