= Beaulard =

Italian Town

Coordinates: 45.0425°N 6.7554°E

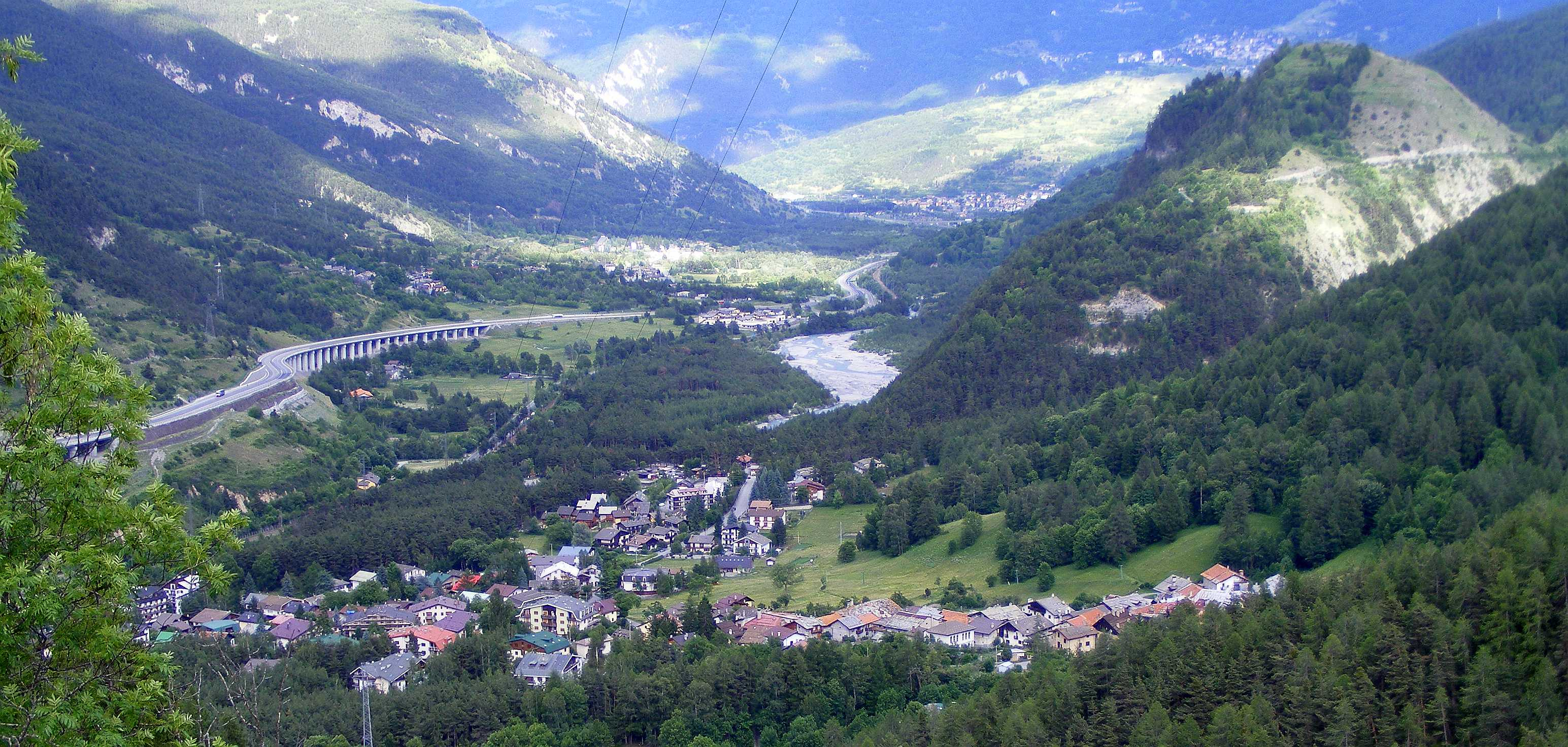
Panorama of Beaulard

Beaulard is a frazione of the comune of Oulx, Metropolitan City of Turin, Piedmont, Italy. It had been a separate commune before 1928.

Evolution of the territory of Oulx. The former commune of Beaulard is #3.

It has a railway station.
