= Borgone Susa =

Borgone Susa Borgon (Piedmontese) Burgùn (Arpitan) Bourgon (French)
- Comune
- Comune di Borgone Susa
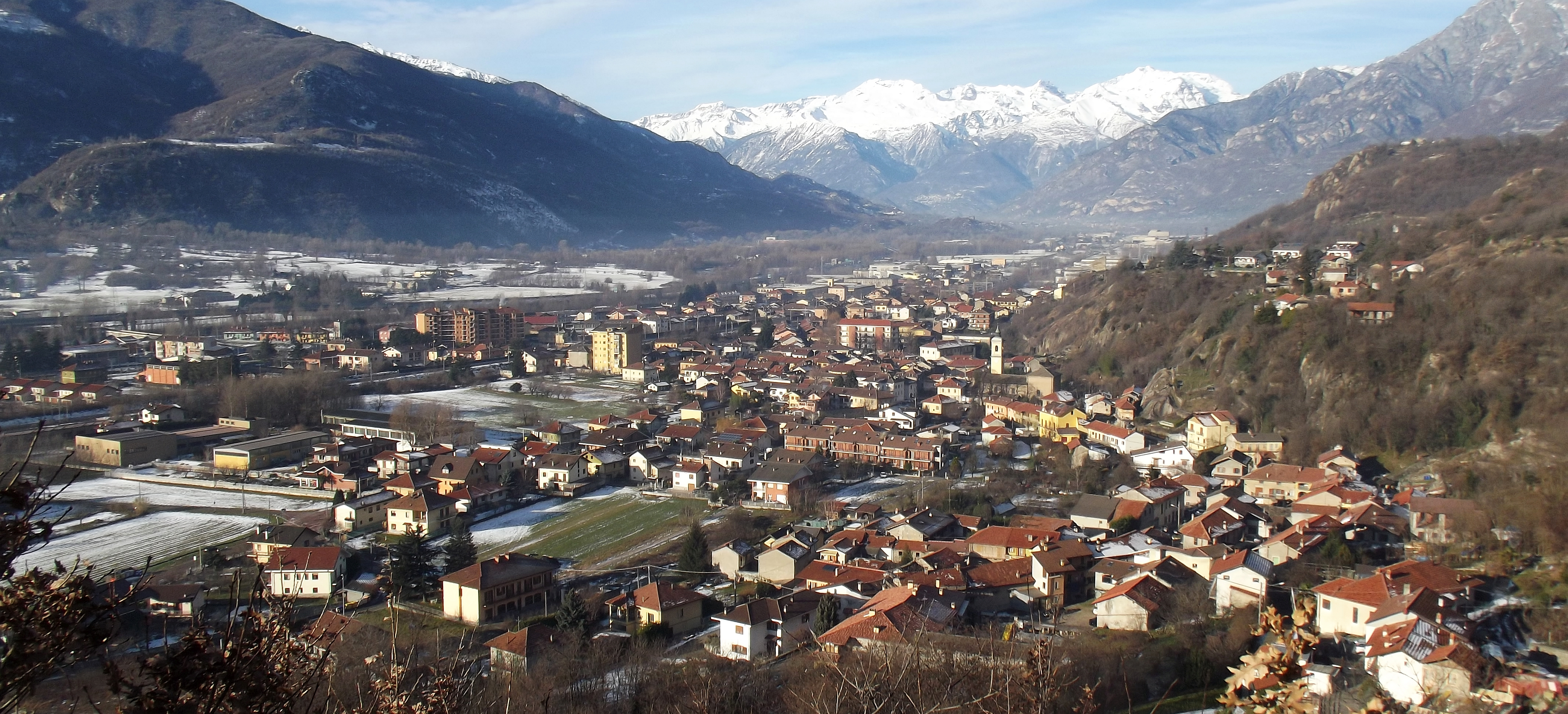

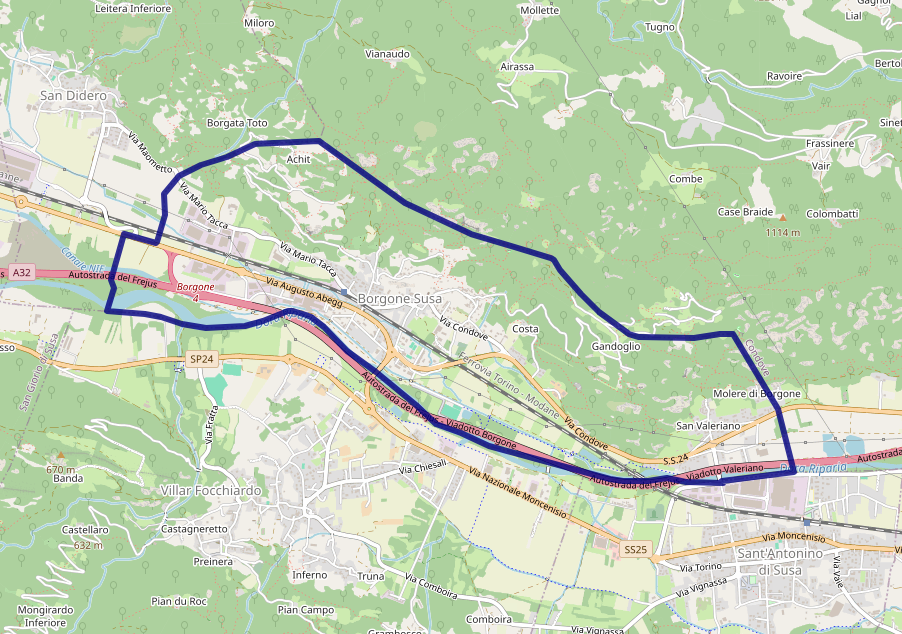

- Location within Italy Location within Piedmont
- Coordinates: 45°7′N 7°14′E
- Country: Italy
- Region: Piedmont
- Metropolitan city: Turin (TO)

Government
  - Mayor: Paolo Alpe

Area
  - Total: 4.96 km^{2} (1.92 sq mi)
- Elevation: 394 m (1,293 ft)

Population (30 November 2017)
  - Total: 2,200
  - Density: 440/km^{2} (1,100/sq mi)
- Demonym: Borgonesi
- Time zone: UTC+1 (CET)
  - Summer (DST): UTC+2 (CEST)
- Postal code: 10050
- Dialing code: 011
- Patron saint: St. Valerian
- Saint day: December 6
- Website: Official website

Borgone Susa (Piedmontese: Borgon, Arpitan: Burgùn, French: Bourgon) is a comune (municipality) in the Metropolitan City of Turin in the Italian region of Piedmont. It is located in the Val di Susa about 35 kilometres (22 mi) west of Turin.
