= Alpignano =

Alpignano Alpignan (Piedmontese)
- Comune
- Comune di Alpignano
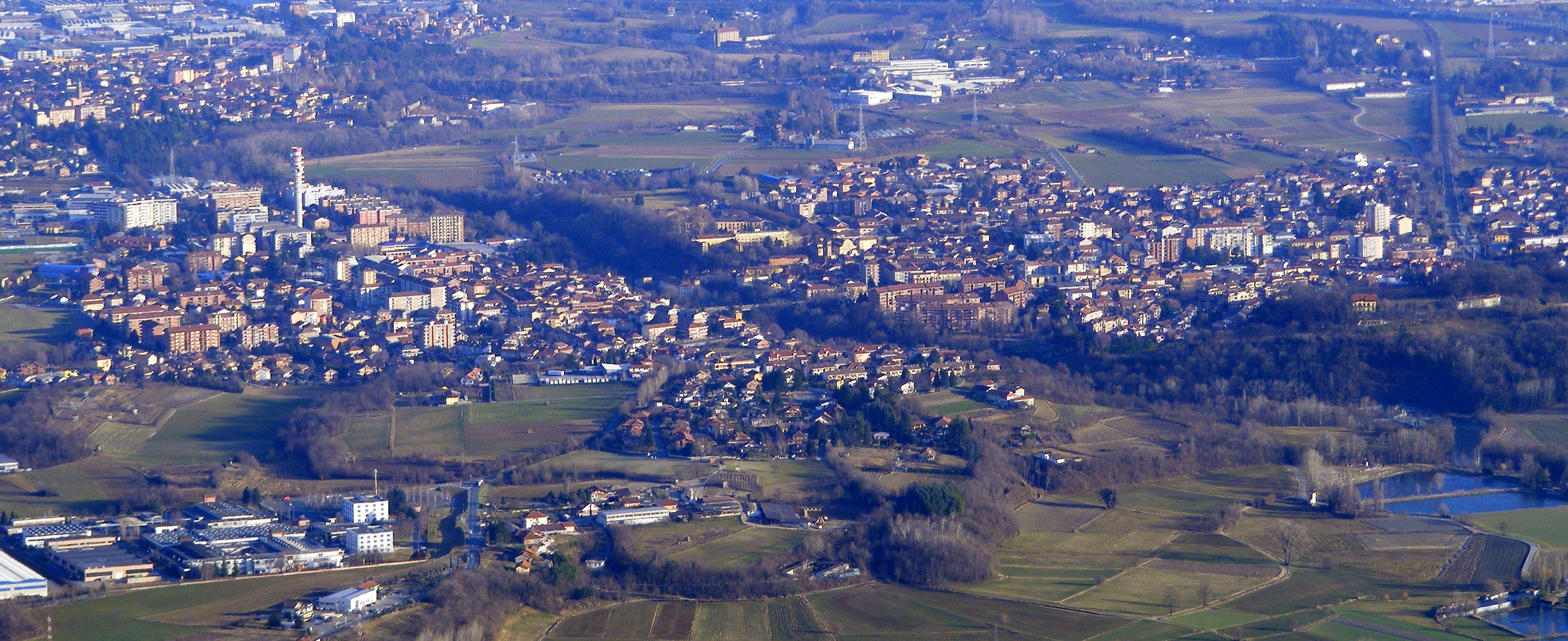
- Alpignano from mount Musinè

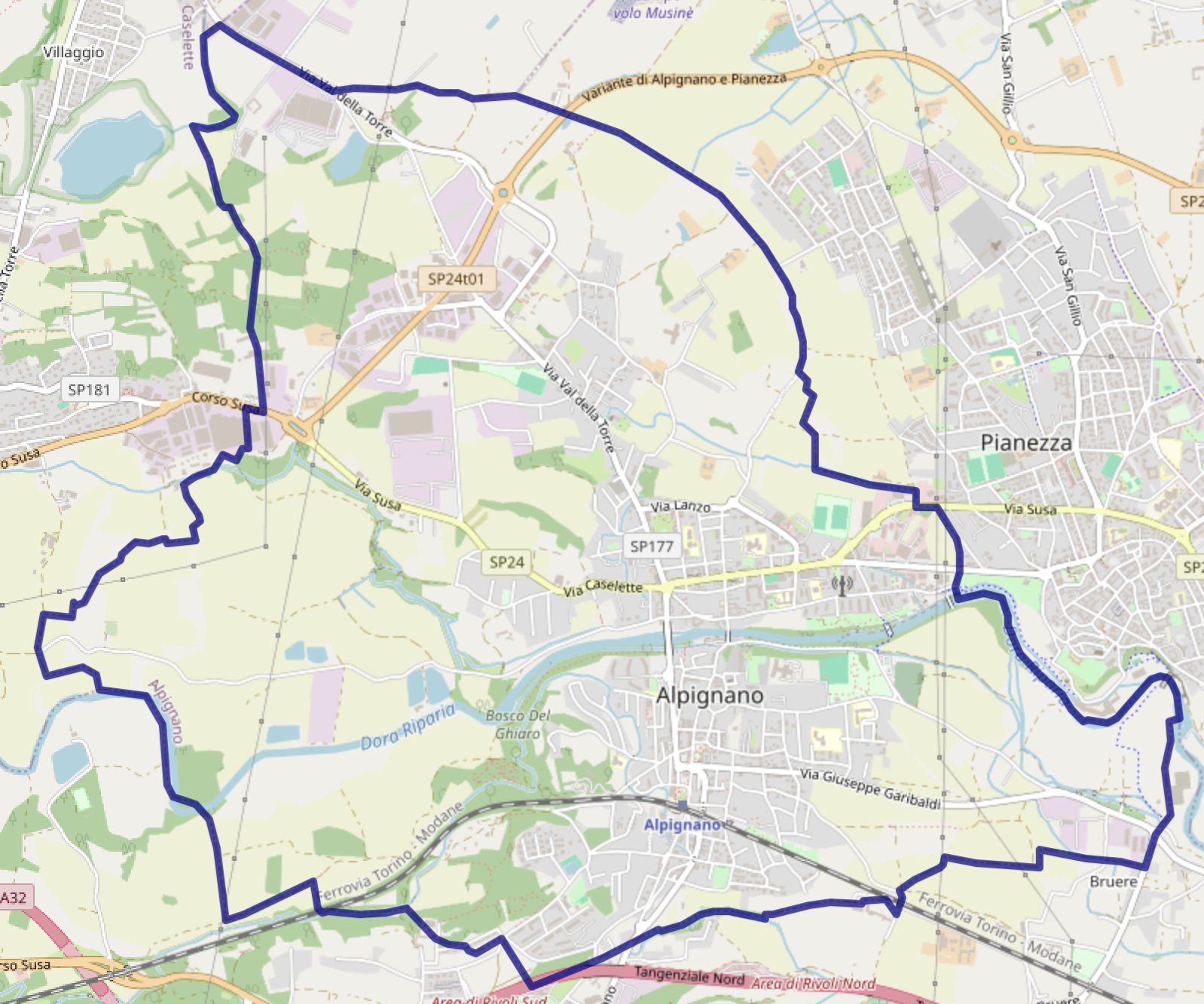

- Location of Alpignano in Italy Alpignano (Piedmont)
- Coordinates: 45°6′N 7°31′E
- Country: Italy
- Region: Piedmont
- Metropolitan city: Turin (TO)

Government
  - Mayor: Steven Giuseppe Palmieri

Area
  - Total: 11.92 km^{2} (4.60 sq mi)
- Elevation: 330 m (1,080 ft)

Population (31 August 2018)
  - Total: 16,710
  - Density: 1,402/km^{2} (3,631/sq mi)
- Demonym: Alpignanesi
- Time zone: UTC+1 (CET)
  - Summer (DST): UTC+2 (CEST)
- Postal code: 10091
- Dialing code: 011
- Patron saint: St. James
- Saint day: 25 July
- Website: Official website

Alpignano (Italian: [alpiɲˈɲaːno]; Piedmontese: Alpignan [alpiˈɲɑŋ]) is a comune (municipality) in the Metropolitan City of Turin in the Italian region Piedmont, located about 15 kilometres (9 mi) west of Turin on the Dora Riparia in the Val di Susa plain.

== Twin towns – sister cities ==
Alpignano is twinned with:

- Riverside, California, United States
- Fontaine, France
