= Snocountry =

SnoCountry, Inc., a not-for-profit ski and snowboard conditions reporting entity, began as the New England Ski Areas Council (NESAC) in October 1968. The original staff of two people was based in the garage of a private home in Woodstock, Vermont. SnoCountry Mountain Reports was the first and is now the largest snow conditions reporting service in the world.

SnoCountry provides snow conditions reports for alpine skiing, cross-country skiing, snowboarding, and snow tubing, along with resort information, to a vast array of media including a national network of radio (over 400 AM and FM stations) and television stations as well as numerous web sites. Open Snow, The Associated Press, Liftopia and The Weather Channel's LocalNow are among those that use SnoCountry Mountain Reports' conditions feeds. Ski and snowboard conditions are reported to a weekly audience of millions.

For the 2022/23 winter season SnoCountry is introducing the following: SnoCountry TV [formerly SnoCountry Snapshot and The Snow Report TV, presented by SnoCountry. SnoCountry TV airs on over 40 TV stations up and down the East Coast. Also new in 2023 is SnoCountry Radio - SnoCountry has launched a live streaming radio station, available on the SnoCountry App or through the website (Snocountry.com). In partnership with RFC Media, the 24-hour station features a crossover blend of upbeat music touching on pop, rock, country and more balanced for extended listening. Fans will not only hear today's biggest music but also the great legendary artists that add the right depth and variety. SnoCountry Radio represents the outdoor lifestyle, giving you every type of music you'd want for a great day on [or off] the slopes!

About SnoCountry: SnoCountry is a not-for-profit industry-owned promotional association that collects and distributes snow conditions, weather, resort events and activities to thousands of affiliates, websites, mobile apps and major Search Engines. SnoCountry also broadcasts thousands of radio ski reports on more than 400 stations throughout the winter season, providing over 2 million impressions every week. Digitally, SnoCountry reaches upwards of 1 million skiers and snowboarders annually through SnoCountry.com, hundreds of conditions widgets on websites throughout the U.S., email newsletters and Social Media. SnoCountry TV episodes airs in 35+ major Northeast metropolitan markets on a weekly basis. New in 2023 is our streaming radio station - SnoCountry Radio – see the link at www.snocountry.com.
