= Susa railway station =

Railway station in Italy

Susa
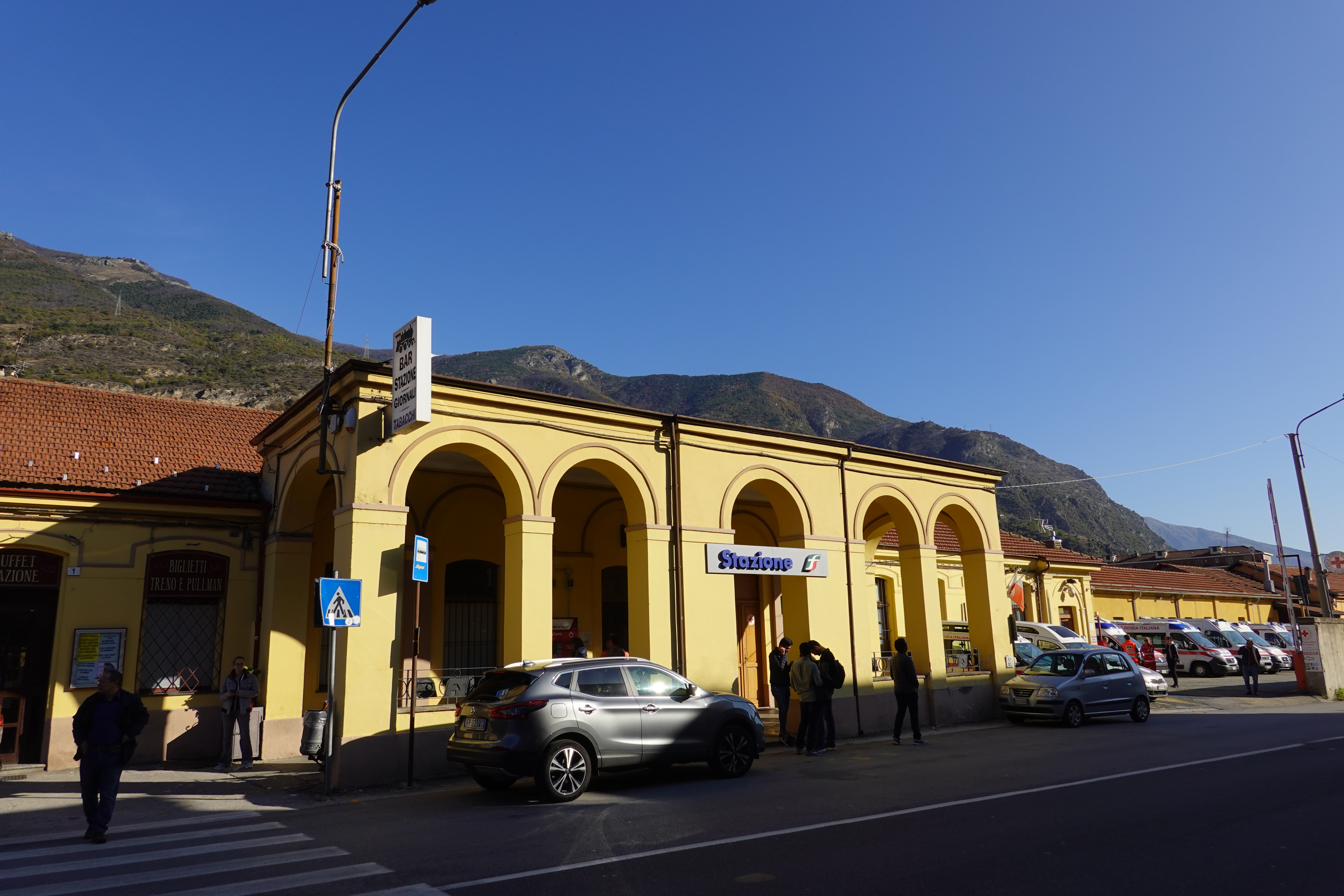
- Susa railway station

General information
- Location: Corso Stati Uniti, 1, Susa; Susa, Metropolitan City of Turin, Piedmont; Italy
- Coordinates: 45°08′19″N 7°03′14″E
- Owner: Rete Ferroviaria Italiana
- Operator: Rete Ferroviaria Italiana
- Line: Turin-Modane railway + Bussoleno-Susa branch
- Platforms: 1
- Tracks: 1
- Train operators: Trenitalia

Other information
- Classification: Silver

History
- Opened: 25 May 1854; 172 years ago

Services
Preceding station	Turin SFM	Following station
Terminus	SFM3	Bussoleno towards Torino Porta Nuova
Location
- Location within Piedmont Location within Northern Italy Location within Italy

Susa (Italian: Stazione di Susa) is a railway station in Susa, Piedmont. The station is located on the Bussoleno-Susa branch of the Turin-Modane railway. The train services are operated by Trenitalia.

== Train services ==
The station is served by the following services:

- Turin Metropolitan services (SFM3) Susa - Bussoleno - Turin
