= Bardonecchia railway station =

Railway station in Italy

Bardonecchia
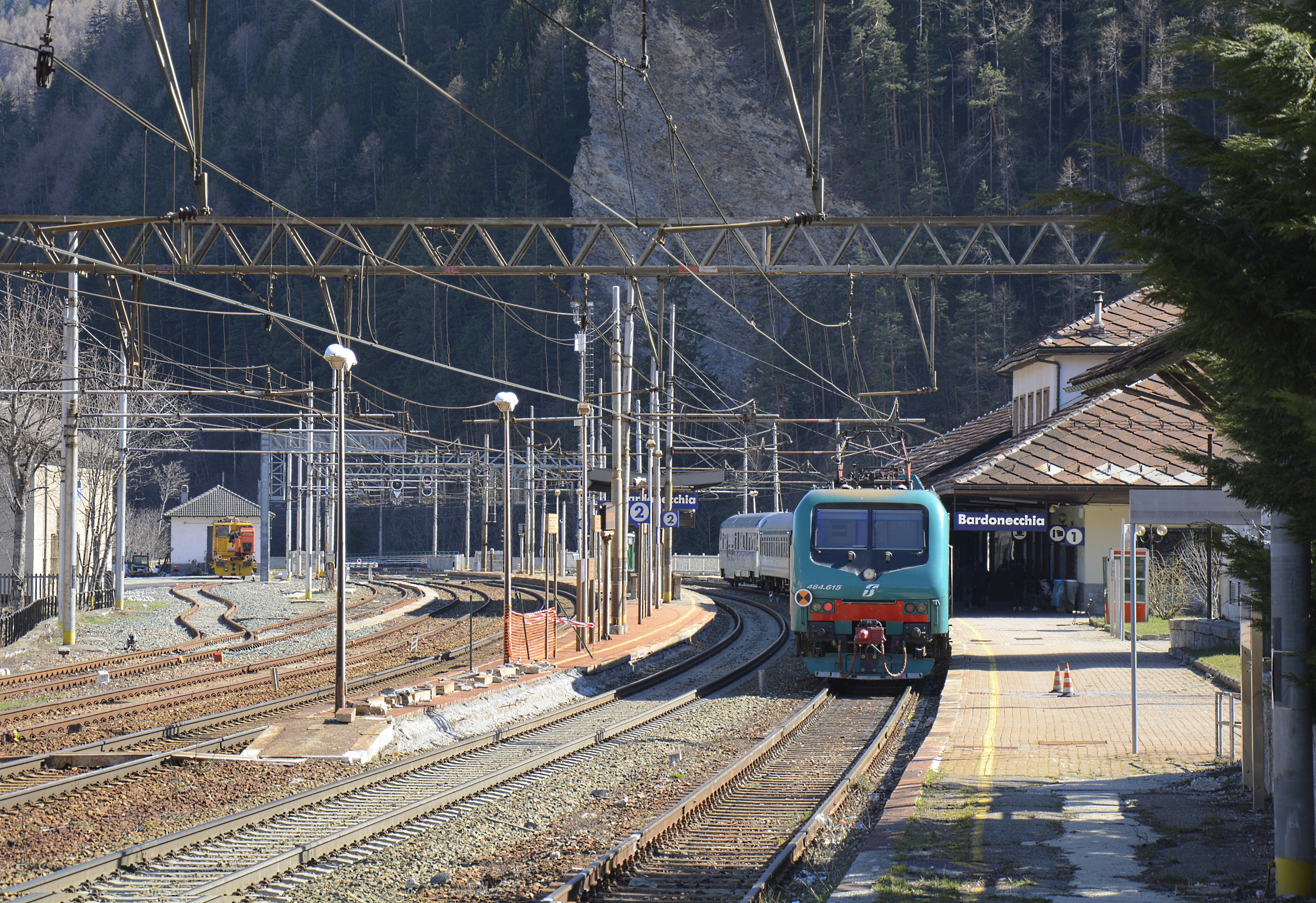

General information
- Location: Piazza Europa 6, Bardonecchia; Bardonecchia, Metropolitan City of Turin, Piedmont; Italy
- Coordinates: 45°04′36″N 06°42′36″E
- Owner: Rete Ferroviaria Italiana
- Operator: Rete Ferroviaria Italiana
- Line: Turin-Modane
- Train operators: Trenitalia; SNCF

Other information
- Classification: Silver

History
- Opened: 16 October 1871; 154 years ago
Location
- Location within Piedmont Location within Northern Italy Location within Italy

Bardonecchia railway station (Italian: Stazione di Bardonecchia) serves the town and comune of Bardonecchia, in the Piedmont region of northwestern Italy. The station is a through station of the Turin-Modane railway. The train services are operated by Trenitalia and SNCF.

Since 2012 it has served line SFM3, part of the Turin metropolitan railway service.

== Train services ==
The station is served by the following services:

- High speed services (TGV) Paris - Chambéry - Turin - Milan
- Turin Metropolitan services (SFM3) Bardonecchia - Bussoleno - Turin

On 11 December 2022, the station became a scheduled stop on the Milan–Paris Frecciarossa, with one train per day in each direction.

Preceding station	SNCF	Following station
Modane towards Paris-Lyon	TGV inOui	Oulx-Cesana-Claviere-Sestriere towards Milan
Preceding station	Turin SFM	Following station
Terminus	SFM3	Beaulard towards Torino Porta Nuova
