= Line SFM3 =

Railway line in Turin, Italy

Line 3

Overview
- Service type: Commuter rail
- Status: Operational
- Locale: Metropolitan City of Turin
- First service: 9 December 2012
- Current operator(s): Trenitalia

Route
- Termini: Torino Porta Nuova; Bardonecchia & Susa
- Stops: 19

Technical
- Rolling stock: MDVC, MDVE, Vivalto
- Track gauge: 1,435 mm (4 ft 8 1/2 in)
- Track owner(s): Turin Metropolitan Railway Service

Line SFM3 is part of the Turin Metropolitan Railway Service. It links Turin to Bardonecchia and Susa.

The line was opened on 9 December 2012. Service was extended into France at Gare de Modane on 10 September 2017, and was offered on Sundays and public holidays. The extension has been discontinued in early 2020.
