= Turin–Modane railway =

Railway line in Italy and France

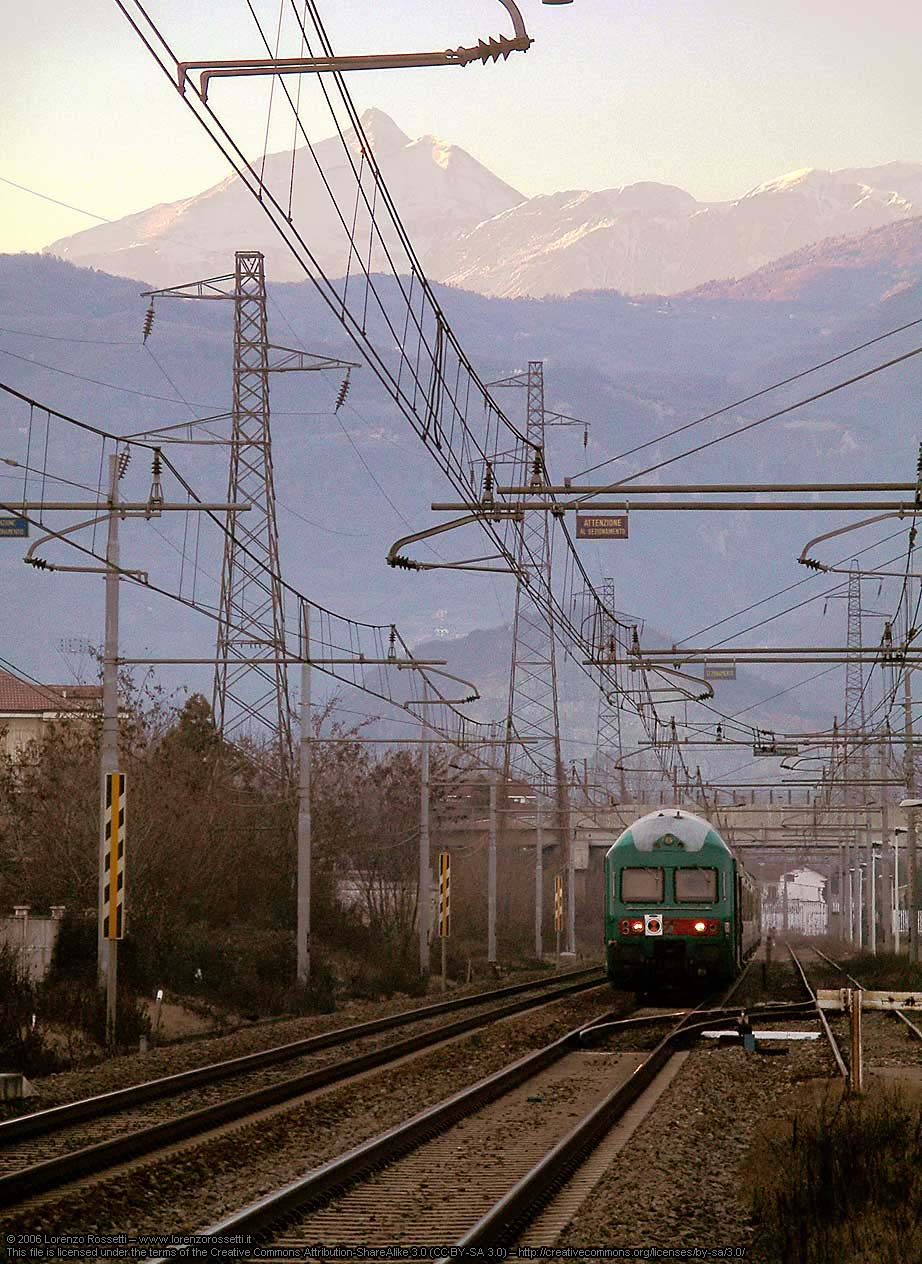
- An Italian train running through the Fréjus railway.

Fréjus Rail Tunnel: Entrance from the Italian side.

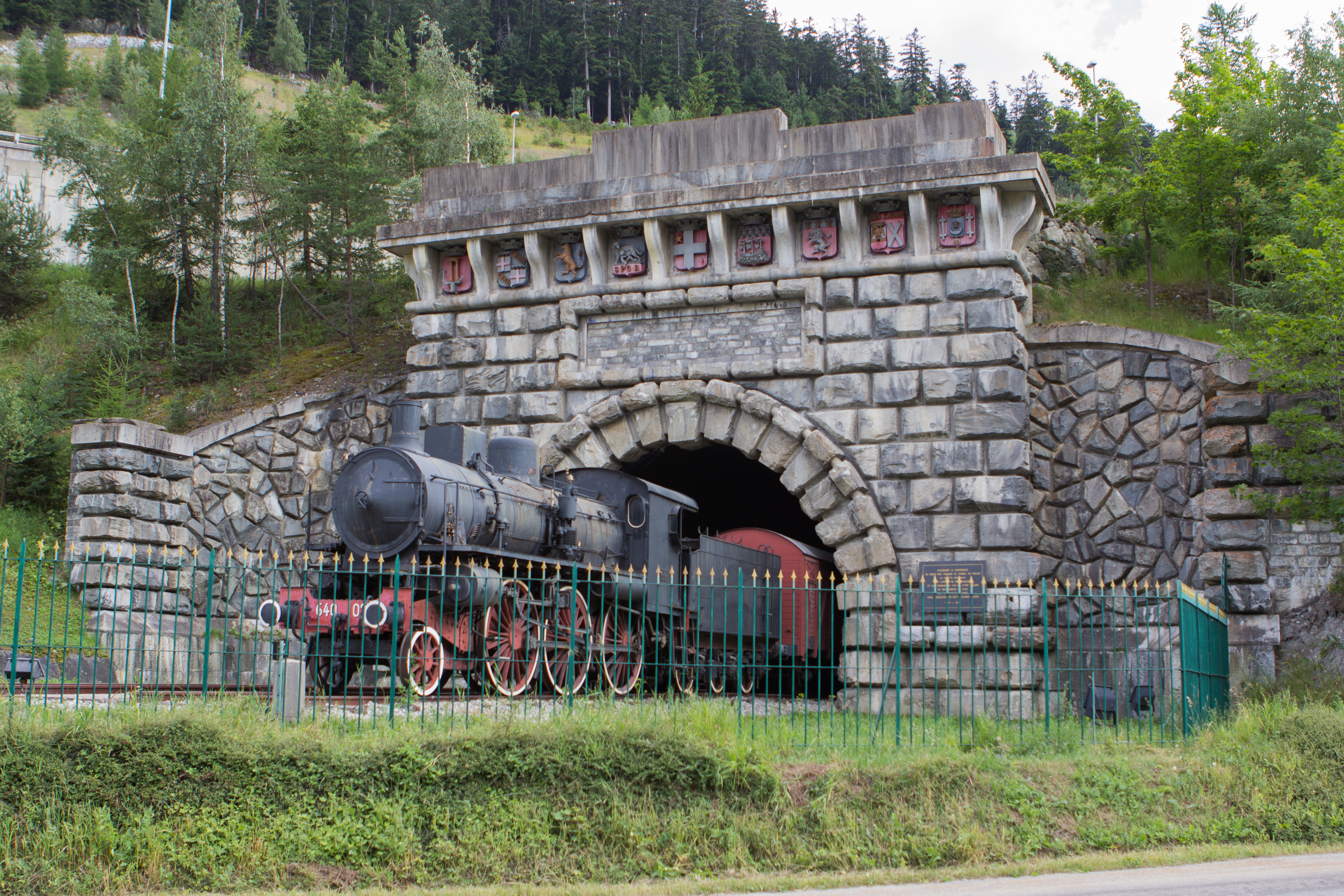
A FS class 740 at the former entrance to the Mont Cenis railway tunnel on the French side Modane Savoie France

The Turin–Modane railway is the international rail connection from Turin, Italy to Modane, France. It passes through the Susa Valley and the Fréjus Rail Tunnel. Together with the French Culoz–Modane railway it is often called "Fréjus Railway" or "Mont Cenis Railway". A major landslide in August 2023 forced its closure for over a year.

Despite running under the Fréjus Pass, it is sometimes called the Mont Cenis Railway because, from antiquity until the Fréjus Rail Tunnel was opened in 1871, most people used the Mont Cenis Pass to get between France and Italy. From 1868 to 1871 the temporary Mont Cenis Pass Railway ran over the Mont Cenis pass to link the French and Italian railways.

== History ==
The Victor Emmanuel Railway, which included both the Culoz–Modane railway across Savoy and the Turin–Modane railway across Piedmont, was largely built in the 1850s by the Kingdom of Sardinia and named after its king, Victor Emmanuel II. Until 1860 Sardinia included both Savoy and Piedmont. The line from Turin to Susa was inaugurated on 22 May 1854. Work on the tunnel began on 31 August 1857 and was completed in September 1871. Work had begun on the line between Bussoleno and Bardonecchia in 1867 and was completed at the same time as the tunnel. The tunnel and line were opened on 16 October 1871. By that time, the Savoy side of the tunnel had become part of France. The decision of the engineers to begin the line at Bussoleno in order to reduce the gradient on the climb near Meana was much criticized for bypassing the city of Susa, which was left isolated on a short branch line. The opening of the tunnel also led to the closure of the short-lived Mont Cenis Pass Railway. In 1865 the line became part of the network of the Società per le strade ferrate dell'Alta Italia (Upper Italian Railways, SFAI) on its foundation in 1865 and was taken over by the Rete Mediterranea (Mediterranean Network) in 1885. Finally in 1905 it became part of the Ferrovie dello Stato network.

The line, originally a single track, was doubled in 1908 between Zappa Junction and Collegno in 1909, between Beaulard and Salbertrand in 1911, between Collegno and Alpignano in 1912, between Alpignano and Avigliana, between Avigliana and Bussoleno in 1915, and between Bussoleno and Salbertrand in 1984. Electrification at three phase was completed between 1912 and 1920, but this system was converted to 3,000 volts direct current in 1961.

=== 1917 derailment ===
On 12 December 1917, a troop train containing 800-1000 French soldiers returning home on leave from fighting in North East Italy, having passed along this line and through the Fréjus Rail Tunnel into France, derailed at speed near Saint-Michel-de-Maurienne, killing several hundred soldiers.

== Features ==
The Turin–Modane railway line is 103 kilometres (64 mi) long, fully electrified and double track. It has the standard Italian automatic block signalling system. The mountain section starts at Bussoleno and the two tracks take different routes. Much of the uphill line to Bardonecchia runs through tunnel between Bussoleno and Salbertrand, while the line running downhill from Bardonecchia, has a lower proportion in tunnel and takes a slightly lower route. West of Salbertrand the two tracks follow the same route. The uphill line was designed with S-shaped tunnels in order to reduce the gradient, increasing its length. Between Bussoleno and Salbertrand the two tracks are at the same level at the intermediate stations, except at Exilles, where the platforms are on different levels. This station is no longer in regular use, being separated by the valley from the village of Exilles and its fort. It can still be used if required for historical trains, or to pick up or drop off groups. On the western edge of Bardonecchia is the mouth of the tunnel, with a monumental gateway, enclosed by two round towers, all topped by battlements. In the nearby village of Rochemolles there are signs of the first entrance to the tunnel; it is now bricked up but it has some holes where the tracks inside can be seen.

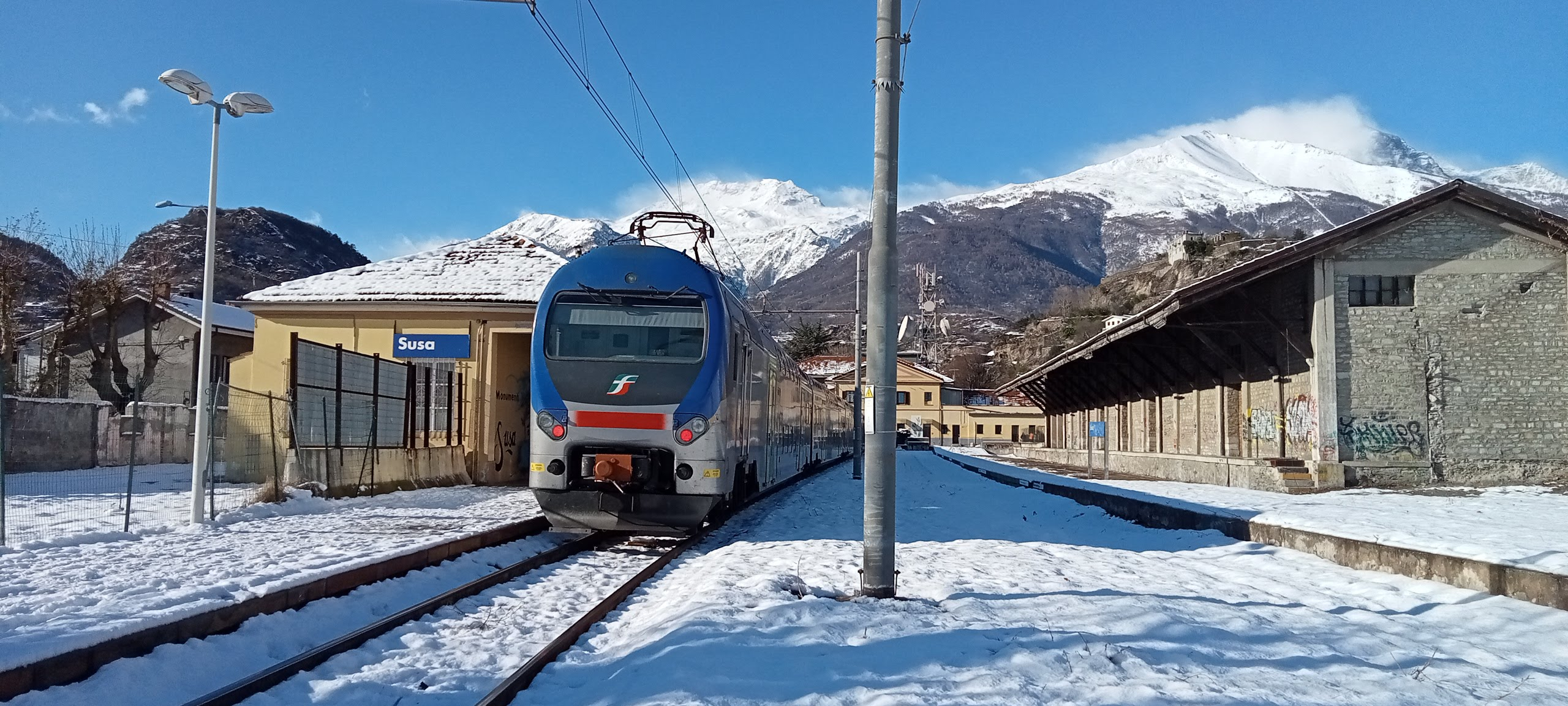
A Treno ad alta frequentazione in Susa on the 9th of December 2021.

Since 2002, regional train services have ended at Bardonecchia; previously they crossed the border through the tunnel to Modane. This is to allow the enlargement of the tunnel to allow the passage of container trains. Now only TGV and Frecciarossa trains reach Modane from Italy. Instead of regional trains, there is a replacement bus service to carry passengers to Modane, although this is a limited service. Freight traffic is still well supported. In particular, special freight trains constitute the Alpine rolling road. Low flat wagons carry trucks through the Alps. These trains are fitted with a passenger carriage for the transport of truck drivers. Four pairs of daily trips each day connect Turin Orbassano goods yard and the French terminal at Aiton at the bottom of the Maurienne Valley.

The highest point of the line is 1,338 metres (4,390 ft), inside the Frejus tunnel. The maximum slope is 3.0%, and the tunnels have a width of 2.72 metres (8 ft 11 in) and a height of 3.96 or 4.11 metres (13 ft 0 in or 13 ft 6 in).

== Future ==
The line is intended to be superseded for long-distance travel by the Turin–Lyon high-speed railway through the Mont d'Ambin base tunnel, currently under construction.

== See also ==
- List of highest railways in Europe

== See also ==
- List of railway lines in Italy
