= Torino Porta Nuova railway station =

Railway station in Turin, Italy

Torino Porta Nuova
- View of the station building.

General information
- Location: Corso Vittorio Emanuele II 10125, Turin; Italy
- Coordinates: 45°03′45″N 7°40′44″E
- Owner: Rete Ferroviaria Italiana
- Operator: Grandi Stazioni
- Lines: Turin–Milan (high speed); Turin–Milan (traditional); Turin–Genoa; Turin–Modane, France; Turin–Torre Pellice; Turin Metro Line M1
- Platforms: 20

Other information
- IATA code: TPY

History
- Opened: 1861
Location
- Location within Turin Location within Piedmont Location within Northern Italy Location within Italy

Torino Porta Nuova railway station (IATA: TPY) is the main railway station of Turin, northern Italy. It is the third busiest station in Italy after Rome Termini and Milan Central, with about 192,000 journeys per day and 70 million travellers a year and a total of about 350 trains per day. Porta Nuova is a terminal station, with trains arriving perpendicularly to the facade. The station is located in Corso Vittorio Emanuele II, right in front of Piazza Carlo Felice (in the South side of the city centre).

Trains between Turin and Milan start or finish at the station, including services using the Turin–Milan high-speed line. A metro station, which is part of Turin Metro (Metropolitana di Torino) line 1, opened in 2007.

== History ==
Construction of the station began in 1861 under the direction of Alessandro Mazzucchetti. The original structure included a clear distinction between the departure area (near Via Nizza) and the arrival area (near Via Paolo Sacchi). The departure area consisted of a large saloon, decorated with columns, stucco work and frescoes depicting the crests of 135 Italian cities showing their distance in kilometers from Turin. This building housed the ticket office, three waiting rooms (one for each of the three classes of railway travel), the Royal Hall and a cafe restaurant.

The station was first opened to the public in December 1864, though construction would not be fully completed until 1868. There was no official opening ceremony at the time, partly because the capital of Italy had just been moved from Turin to Florence. An official opening ceremony inaugurating the station was performed on 4 February 2009. The name Porta Nuova ("New Gate" in English) refers to an old city gate once standing nearby, right along the South side of the old city walls, at the bottom of present-day Via Roma (once called Via Nuova): after the walls were torn down at the beginning of the 19th century, the gates themselves were demolished – with the exception was Porta Palatina – but their old names kept being used as local place names (other examples are Porta Susa and Porta Palazzo).

Enzo Ferrari attended "Bar del Nord" in Porta Nuova, where he met those connected with automobiles and racing when he was working in Turin as a young man, circa 1918–1919.

A station of the Turin Metro (Metropolitana di Torino) named Porta Nuova opened under the main station on 5 October 2007.

== Station upgrades ==
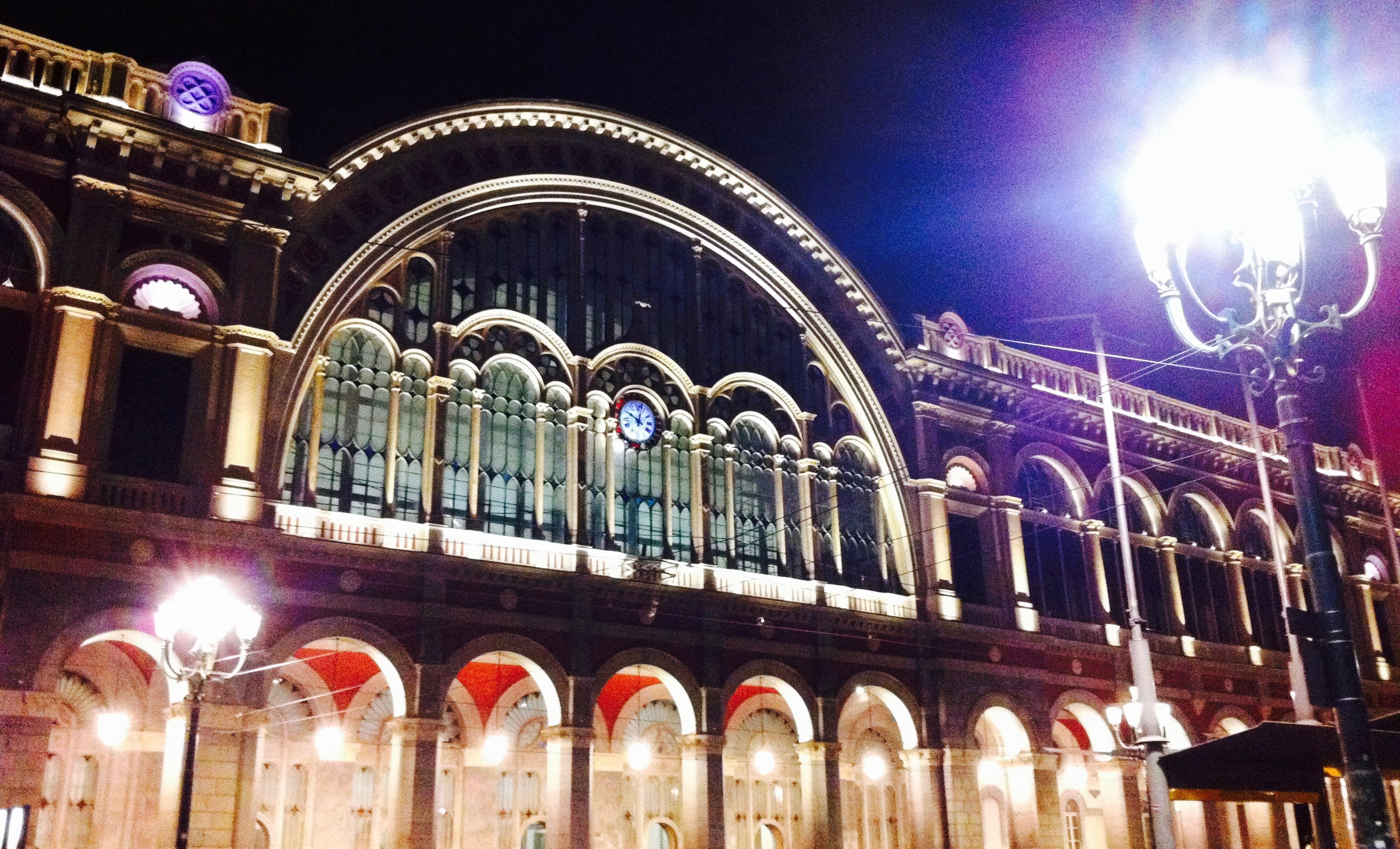
Station facade, after renovations

The station was included in a nationwide program of upgrades to the main Italian stations, by Grandi Stazioni, a subsidiary of Ferrovie dello Stato. In the first stage of renovations completed on February 4, 2009, 44,146 square metres (475,184 sq ft) of the 92,747-square-metre (998,320 sq ft) area of the station buildings was redeveloped. The areas allocated to services for passengers, dining, shopping, culture and leisure was increased considerably. In January 2013, restoration work continued on the facade and interior, preserving historical elements from the 19th century, including its distinctive red colour. After nearly 4 years of work, scaffolding came down and the building was unveiled to the public, featuring a new, coloured LED lighting scheme. In December 2016, Unieuro, a large-scale electronics and domestic appliances retailer, opened a 1,400 m^{2} (15,069 sq ft) location within the station. Work continues in 2017 on upgrades to the track area, including the addition of more fully accessible platforms.

== Structure ==
The station is built on several levels. An underground level is occupied by local divisions of FS and businesses. The platforms are on the ground floor, along with passenger lounges and associated services for passengers and commercial activities. On the upper floors are offices and a post office.

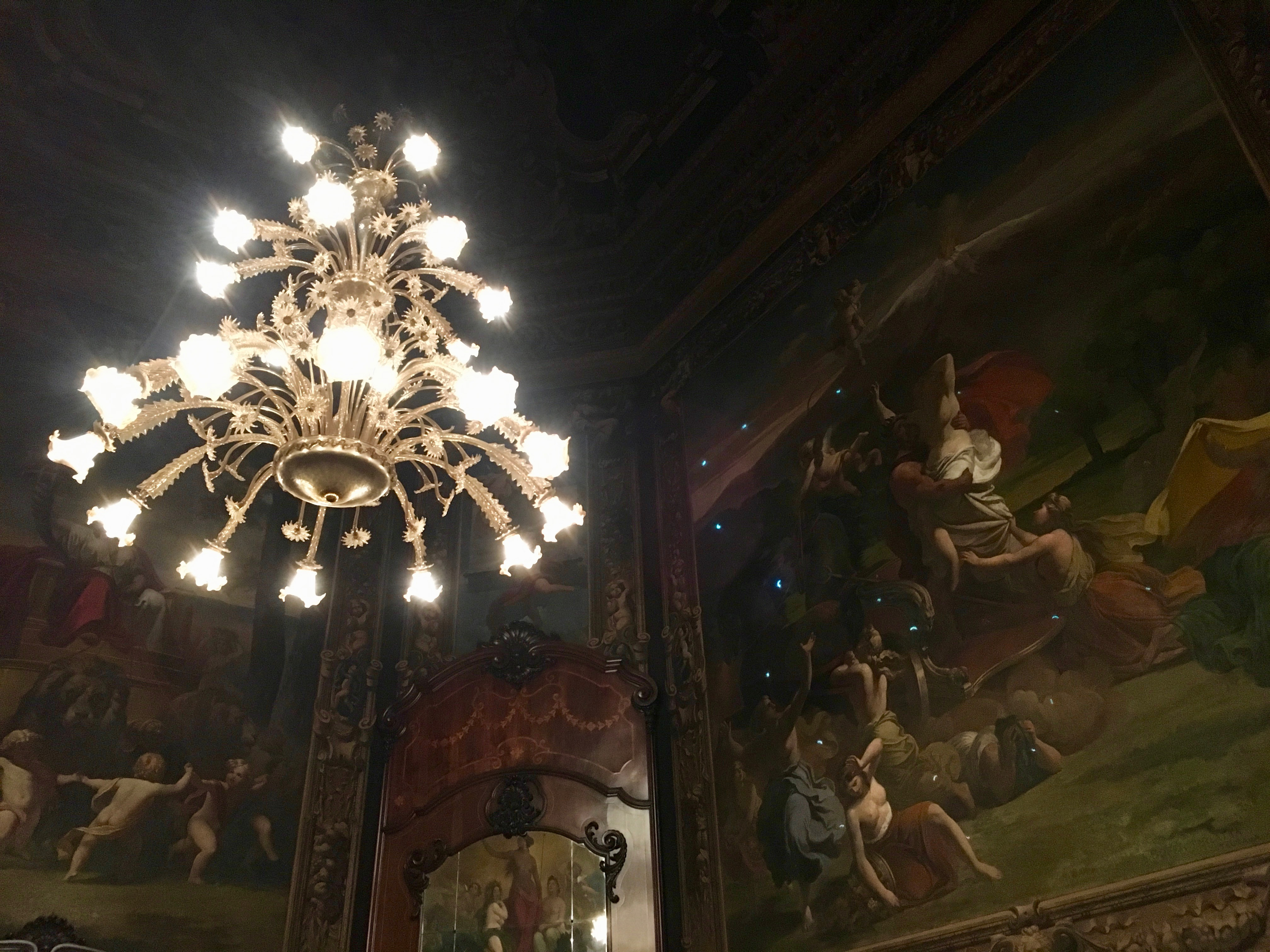
One corner of the Gonin Room

=== The Gonin Room ===
In a corridor off the central gallery of the station, a former first-class waiting room where members of the Royal Savoy family awaited their trains, is still visible today. Modest in size, at 75 m^{2} (810 sq ft), the room is well preserved, featuring original furniture consisting of armchairs, tables, and mirrors. It is not open to the general public, except on special occasions.

The room's name is derived from Francesco Gonin, the artist who painted its frescoes. The paintings, still well maintained, represent the elements of nature - Earth, Water, and Fire. The four corners of the room feature imagery depicting the four continents of Europe, Asia, Africa and the Americas. More impressive is the use of trompe-l'œil effect by Gonin, who wanted to give visitors the impression of a ceiling open to the sky.

== Train services ==
The station is served by the following services:

- High speed services (Frecciarossa) Turin – Milan – Bologna – Florence – Rome
- High speed services (Frecciarossa) Turin – Milan – Reggio Emilia – Bologna – Florence – Rome – Naples – Salerno
- High speed services (Italo) Turin - Milan - Reggio Emilia - Bologna - Florence - Rome - Naples - Salerno
- High speed services (Frecciabianca) Turin - Milan - Brescia - Verona - Vicenza - Padua - Venice - Trieste
- High speed services (Frecciabianca) Turin - Parma - Bologna - Ancona - Pescara - Foggia - Bari - Brindisi - Lecce
- High speed services (Frecciabianca) Turin - Alessandria - Genova - La Spezia - Pisa - Livorno - Rome
- Intercity services Turin – Asti – Alessandria – Genoa - La Spezia - Pisa - Livorno - Rome - Naples - Salerno
- Intercity services Turin – Asti – Alessandria – Bologna – Rimini – Ancona – Pescara – Foggia – Bari – Brindisi – Lecce
- Night train (Intercity Notte) Turin - Alessandria - Bologna - Ancona - Pescara - Foggia - Bari - Brindisi - Lecce
- Night train (Intercity Notte) Turin - Genoa - La Spezia - Pisa - Livorno - Rome - Naples - Salerno
- Night train (Intercity Notte) Turin - Milan - Parma - Rome - Naples - Salerno
- Night train (Intercity Notte) Turin - Milan - Parma - Reggio Emilia - Florence - Rome - Salerno - Lamezia Terme - Reggio di Calabria
- Express services (Regionale Veloce) Turin – Chivasso – Santhià – Vercelli – Novara – Milan
- Express services (Regionale Veloce) Turin - Chivasso – Ivrea – Aosta
- Regional services (Treno regionale) Turin – Asti – Alessandria – Ronco – Genoa
- Turin Metropolitan services (SFM3) Bardonecchia - Bussoleno - Turin
- Turin Metropolitan services (SFM3) Susa - Bussoleno - Turin

== See also ==
- Turin Metro
- Turin metropolitan railway service
- Torino Porta Susa railway station
- History of rail transport in Italy
- List of railway stations in Piedmont
- Rail transport in Italy
- Railway stations in Italy
