= Outline of Turin =

Overview of and topical guide to Turin

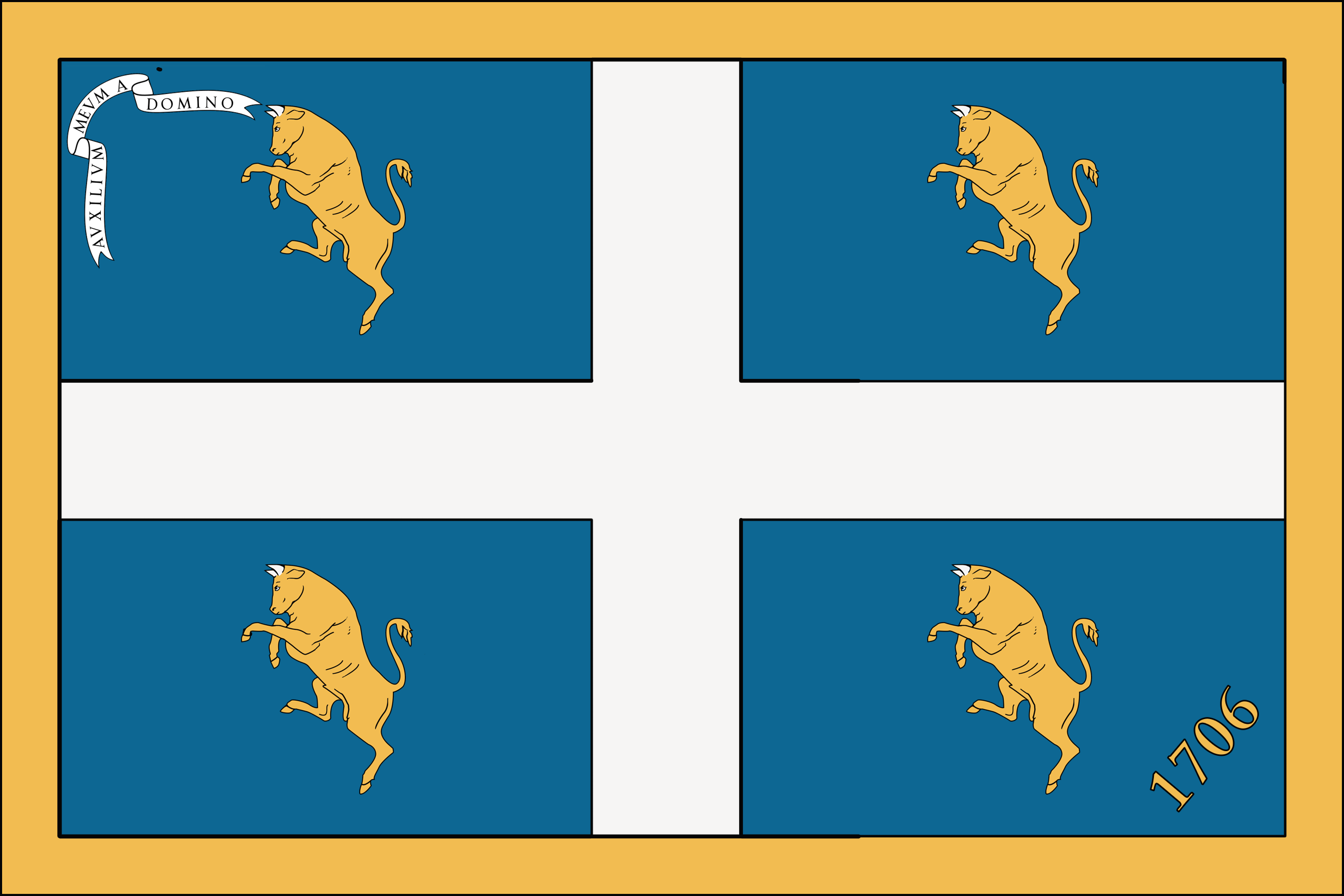
Flag of Turin

Coat of arms of Turin

The following outline is provided as an overview of and topical guide to Turin:

Turin – important business and cultural centre, and capital city of the Piedmont region in northern Italy. The city has a rich culture and history, being known for its numerous art galleries, restaurants, churches, palaces, opera houses, piazzas, parks, gardens, theatres, libraries, museums and other venues. Turin is well known for its Renaissance, Baroque, Rococo, Neo-classical, and Art Nouveau architecture. Many of Turin's public squares, castles, gardens and elegant palazzi such as the Palazzo Madama, were built between the 16th and 18th centuries. The city used to be a major European political center. From 1563, it was the capital of the Duchy of Savoy, then of the Kingdom of Sardinia ruled by the Royal House of Savoy, and the first capital of the unified Italy (the Kingdom of Italy) from 1861 to 1865. The city hosts some of Italy's best universities, colleges, academies, lycea and gymnasia, such as the University of Turin, founded in the 15th century, and the Turin Polytechnic. Even though much of its political significance and importance had been lost by World War II, Turin became a major European crossroad for industry, commerce and trade, and is part of the famous "industrial triangle" along with Milan and Genoa. Turin is ranked third in Italy, after Milan and Rome, for economic strength.

== General reference ==
- Pronunciation: English: /tjʊəˈrɪn/ ture-IN or /ˈtjʊərɪn/ TURE-in, Piedmontese: [tyˈriŋ]; Italian: Torino, pronounced [toˈriːno]; Latin: Augusta Taurinorum, then Taurinum.
- Common English name(s): Turin
- Official English name(s): City of Turin
- Adjectival(s): Turinese
- Demonym(s): Turinese

== Geography of Turin ==
Geography of Turin

- Turin is:
  - a city
    - capital of Piedmont
    - capital of the Metropolitan City of Turin
- Population of Turin: 4,392,526
- Area of Turin: 25,402 km^{2} (9,808 sq mi)
- Atlas of Turin

=== Location of Turin ===
Turin (Italy)
- Turin is situated within the following regions:
  - Northern Hemisphere and Eastern Hemisphere
  - Eurasia
    - Europe (outline)
      - Western Europe
      - Southern Europe
        - Italian Peninsula
          - Italy (outline)
            - Northern Italy
              - Northwest Italy
                - Piedmont
                  - Turin metropolitan area
                    - Metropolitan City of Turin
- Time zone(s):
  - Central European Time (UTC+01)
  - Central European Summer Time (UTC+02)

=== Environment of Turin ===
- Climate of Turin

=== Landforms of Turin ===
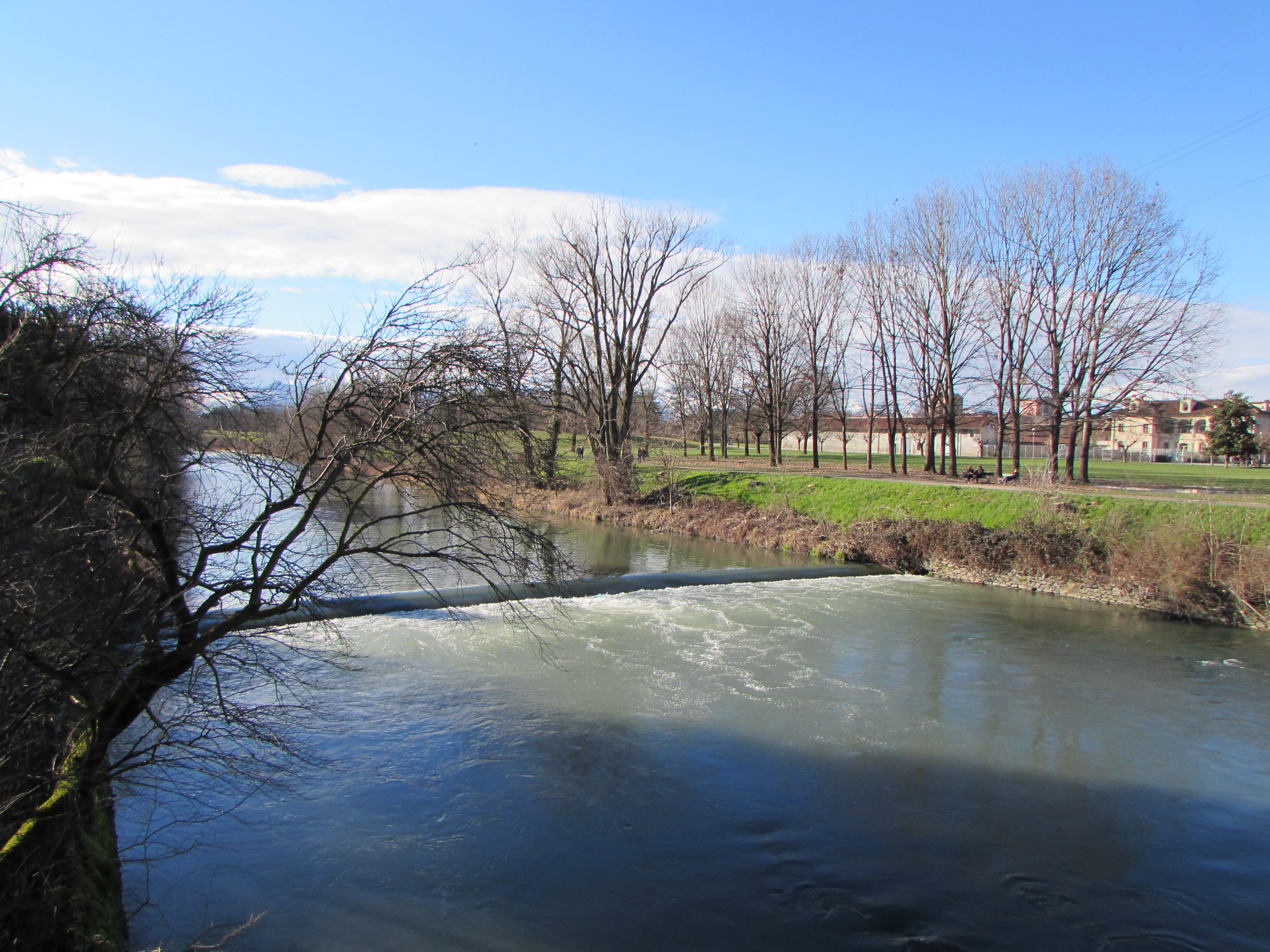
The Dora Riparia river at Parco della Pellerina in Turin

- Hills in Turin
  - Superga
- Rivers in Turin
  - Dora Riparia
  - Po River
- Valleys in Turin
  - Susa Valley

=== Areas of Turin ===
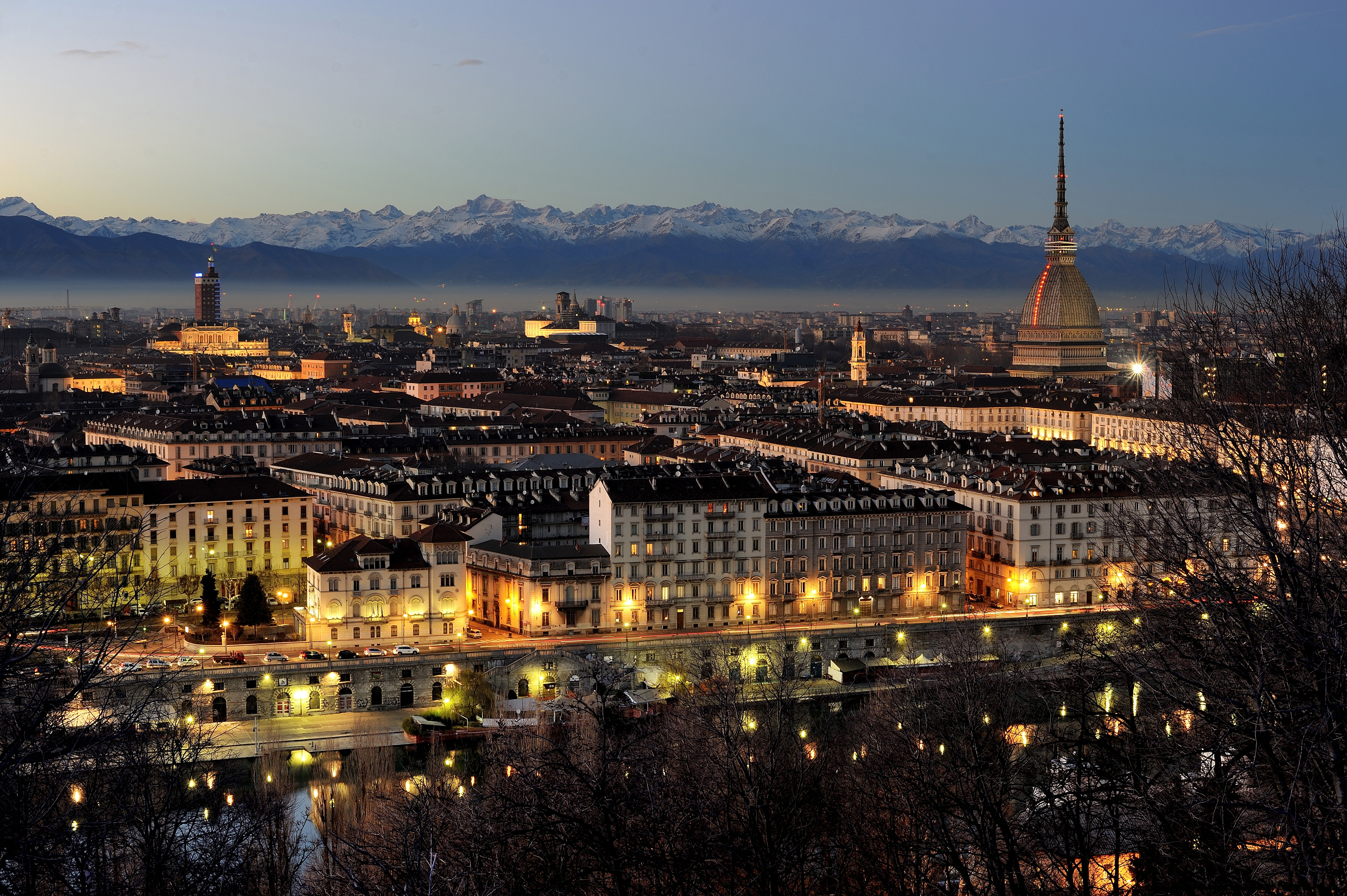
Turin during the blue hour, as seen from Monte dei Cappuccini

==== Districts of Turin ====
- Aurora
- Lingotto

==== Neighborhoods in Turin ====
Neighborhoods in Turin

- Madonna di Campagna
- Valdocco

=== Locations in Turin ===
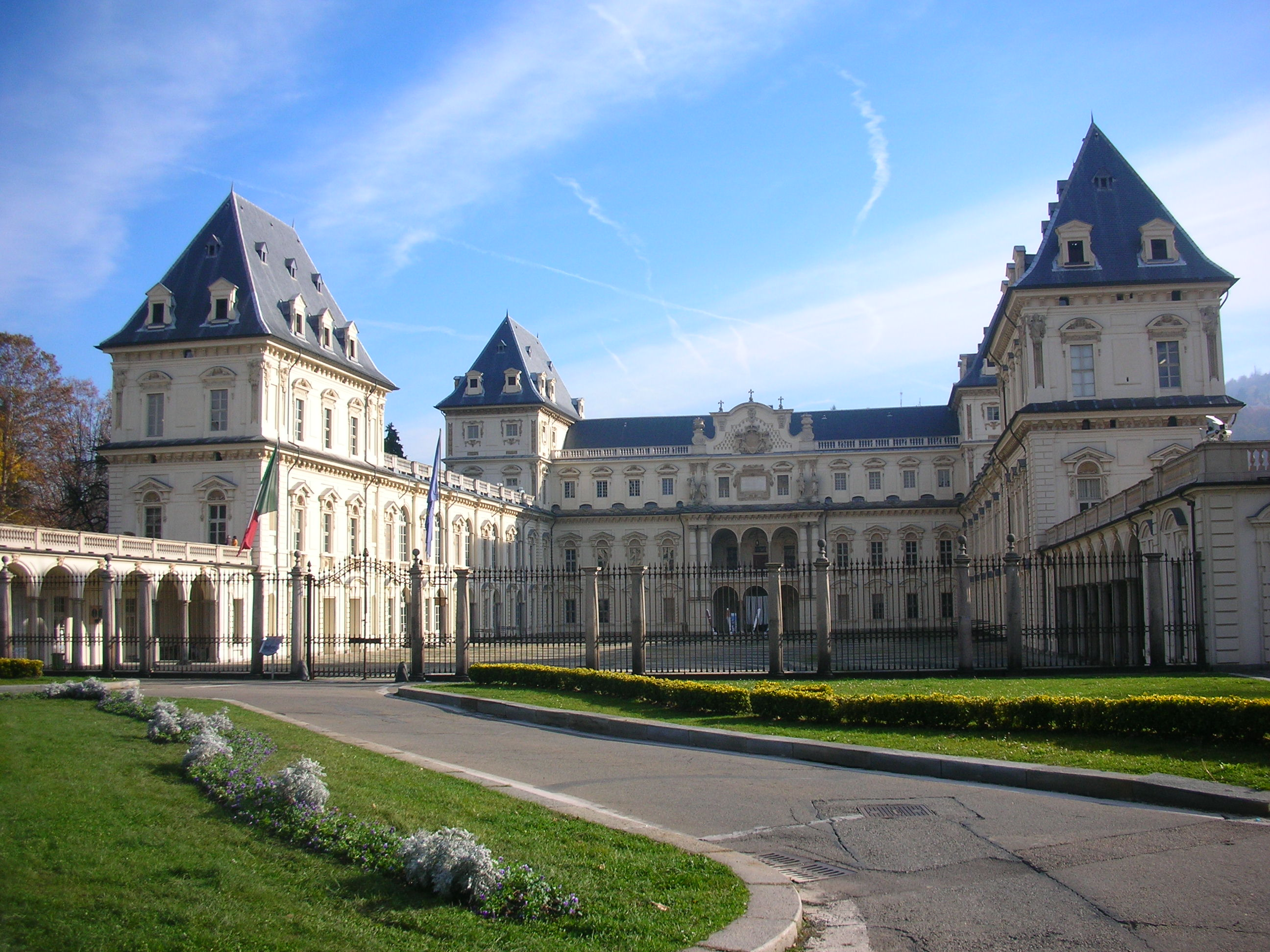
Castello del Valentino

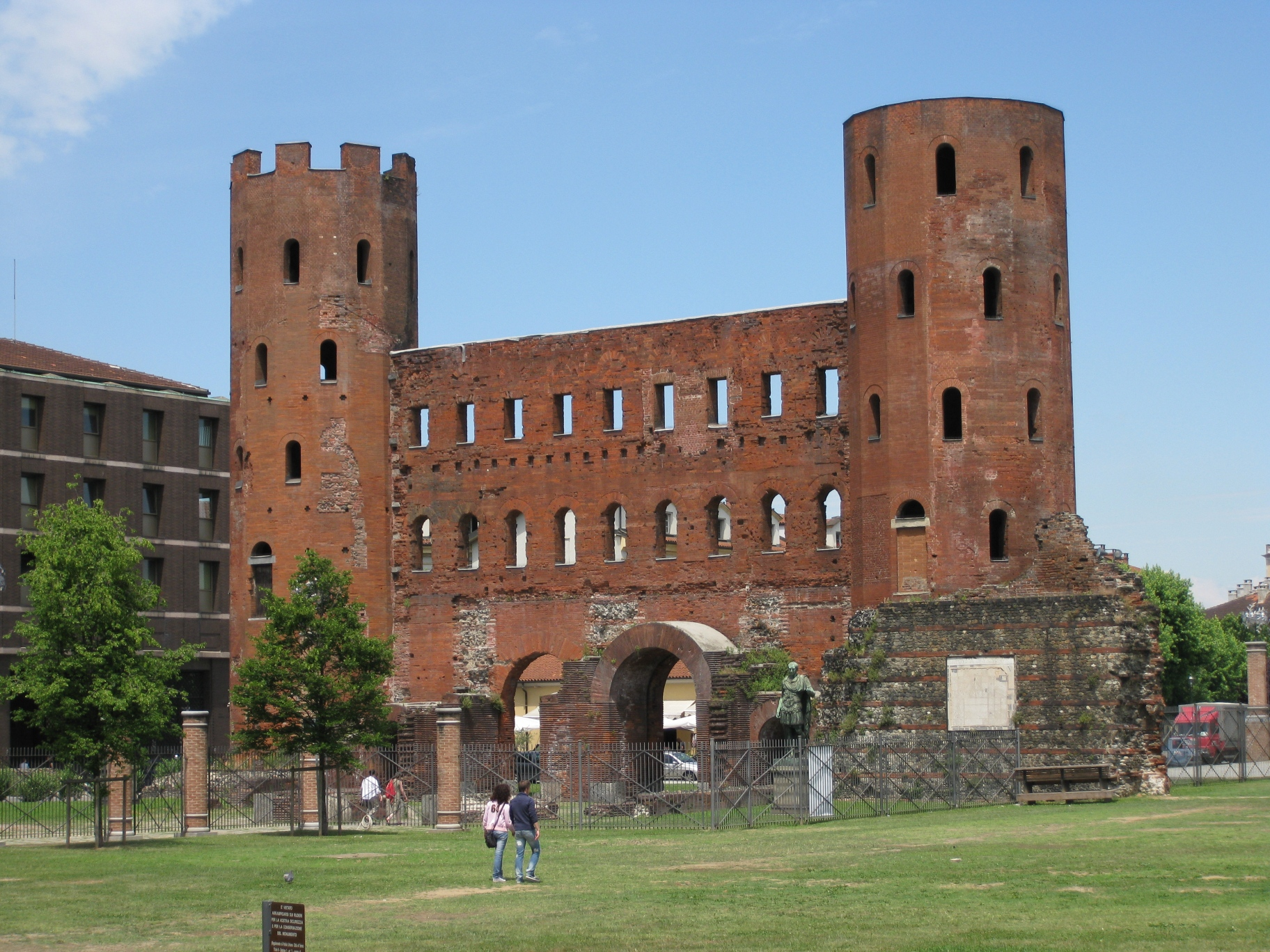
The Palatine Towers

Museo Nazionale dell'Automobile

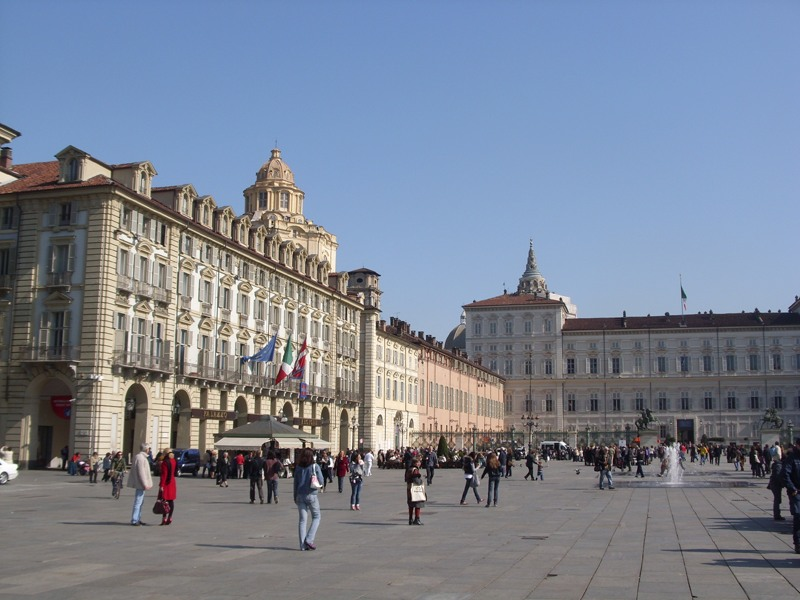
Piazza Castello

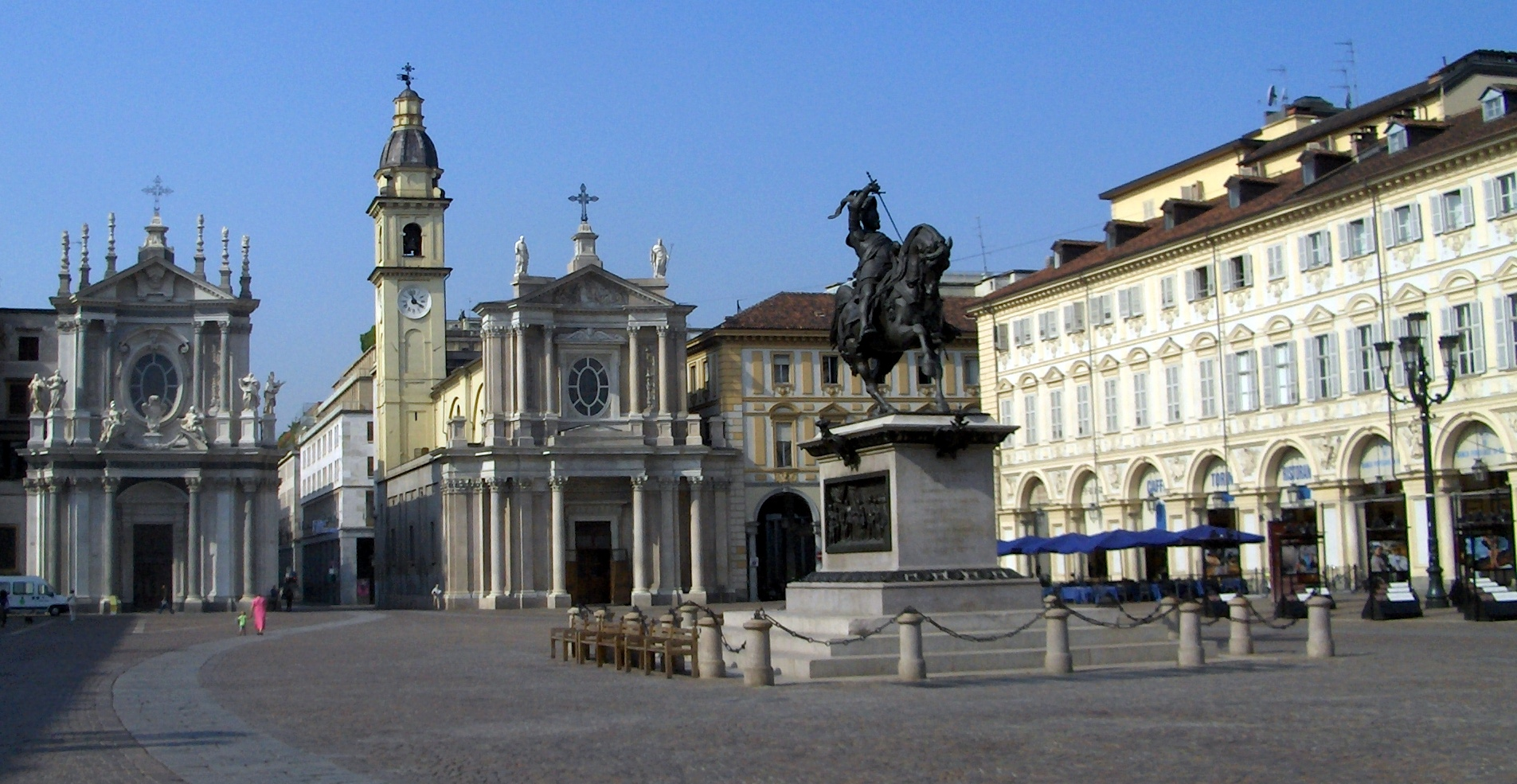
Piazza San Carlo

- Biblioteca Civica Centrale
- Mole Antonelliana
- Ponte Mosca
- Turin National University Library

==== Ancient monuments in Turin ====
- Palatine Towers

==== Exhibition halls in Turin ====
- New Exhibition Hall
- Torino Esposizioni

==== Monuments in Turin ====
- Equestrian monument of Emmanuel Philibert
- Monument to Vittorio Emanuele II

==== Museums and galleries in Turin ====
- Accorsi - Ometto Museum
- Egyptian Museum
  - Turin Papyrus Map
  - Turin King List
  - Judicial Papyrus of Turin
  - Turin Erotic Papyrus
- Museo Nazionale dell'Automobile
- Museum of Human Anatomy Luigi Rolando
- Museum of Oriental Art
- Museum of the Risorgimento
- Sabauda Gallery
- Turin City Museum of Ancient Art
- Turin Museum of Natural History

==== Parks and gardens in Turin ====
- Orto Botanico dell'Università di Torino
- Parco del Valentino

==== Public squares in Turin ====
Piazzas in Turin

- Piazza Carlo Felice
- Piazza Castello
- Piazza San Carlo
- Piazza Statuto
- Piazza Vittorio Veneto

==== Religious sites in Turin ====
- Santuario della Consolata

==== Villas and palaces in Turin ====
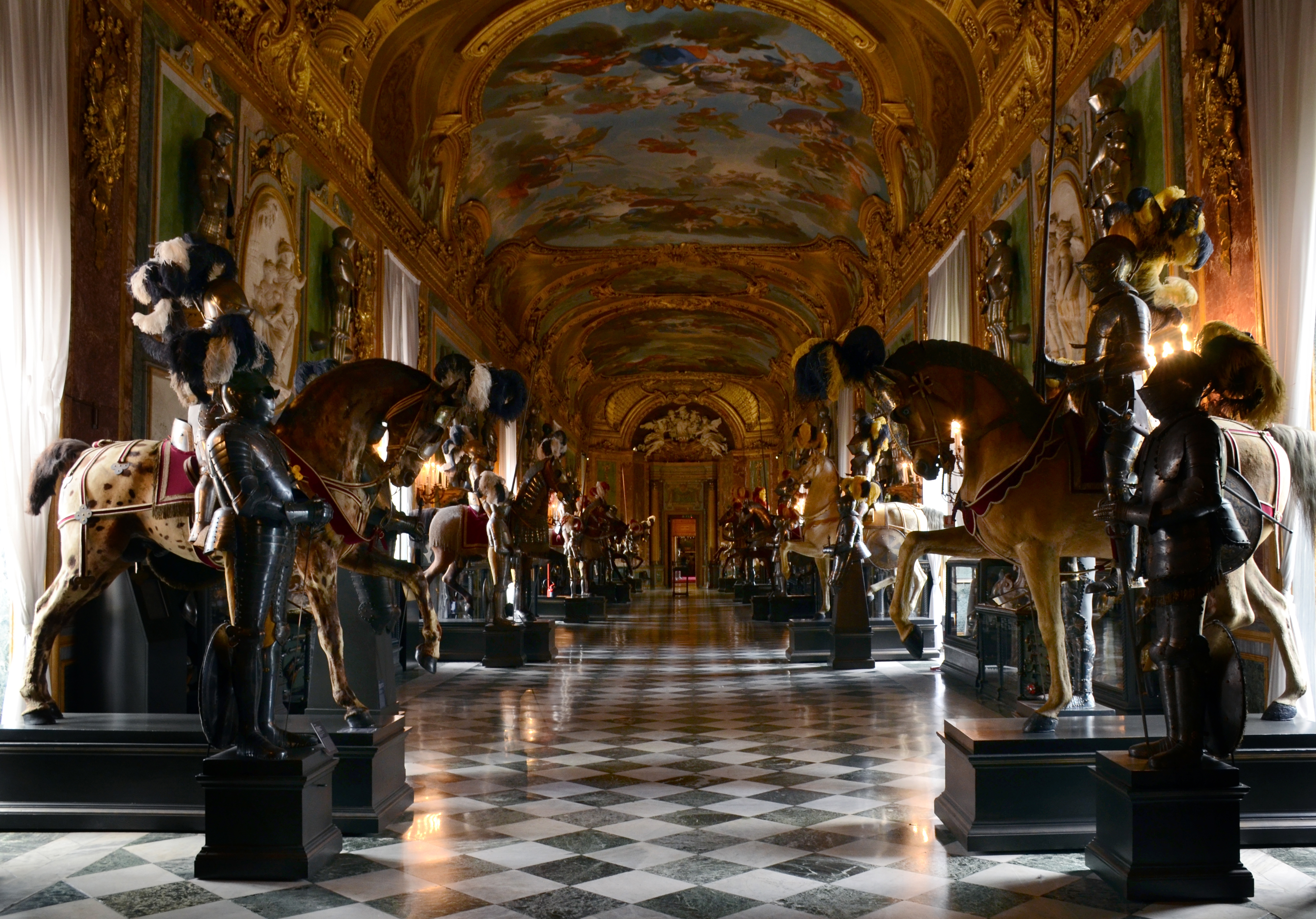
Royal Armoury of Turin

- Casa Fenoglio-Lafleur
- Castello del Valentino
- Palazzo Carignano
- Palazzo Chiablese
- Palazzo Gualino
- Palazzo Madama
- Royal Palace of Turin
  - Royal Armoury of Turin
  - Royal Library of Turin
    - Portrait of a Man in Red Chalk
- Villa della Regina

=== Demographics of Turin ===
Demographics of Turin

== Government and politics of Turin ==
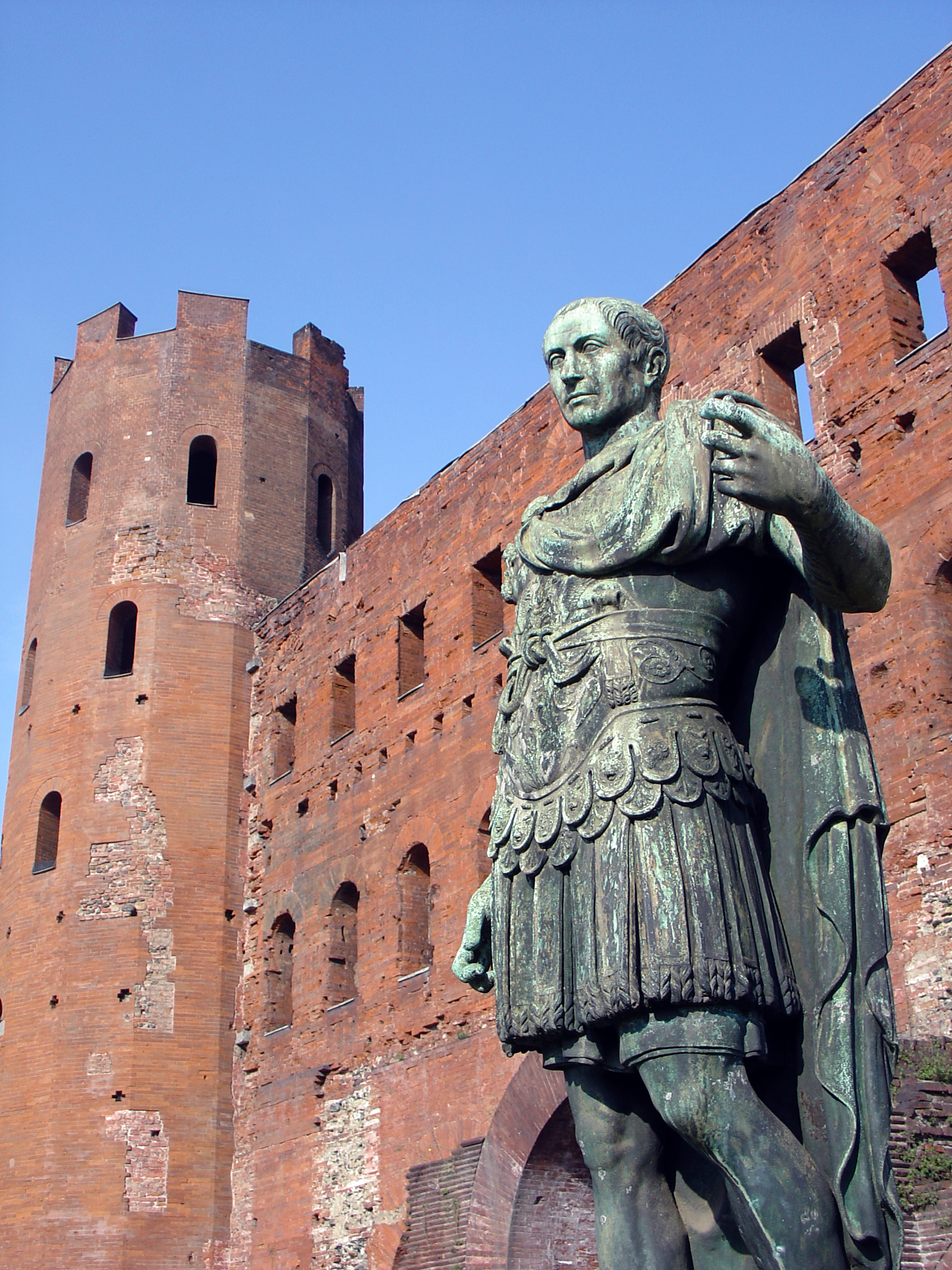
Bronze statue of Julius Caesar, founder of Julia Augusta Taurinorum, with the Palatine Towers in the background

Government and politics of Turin

- Elections in Turin
  - Turin municipal election, 2016
- Government of Turin
  - List of mayors of Turin

== History of Turin ==
History of Turin

=== History of Turin, by period or event ===
- Timeline of Turin
- Province of Turin
- Treaty of Turin (1381)
- Treaty of Turin (1733)
- Treaty of Turin (1816)
- Treaty of Turin (1860)

=== History of Turin, by subject ===
- 1922 Turin Massacre
- Battle of Turin
- Siege of Turin

== Culture of Turin ==
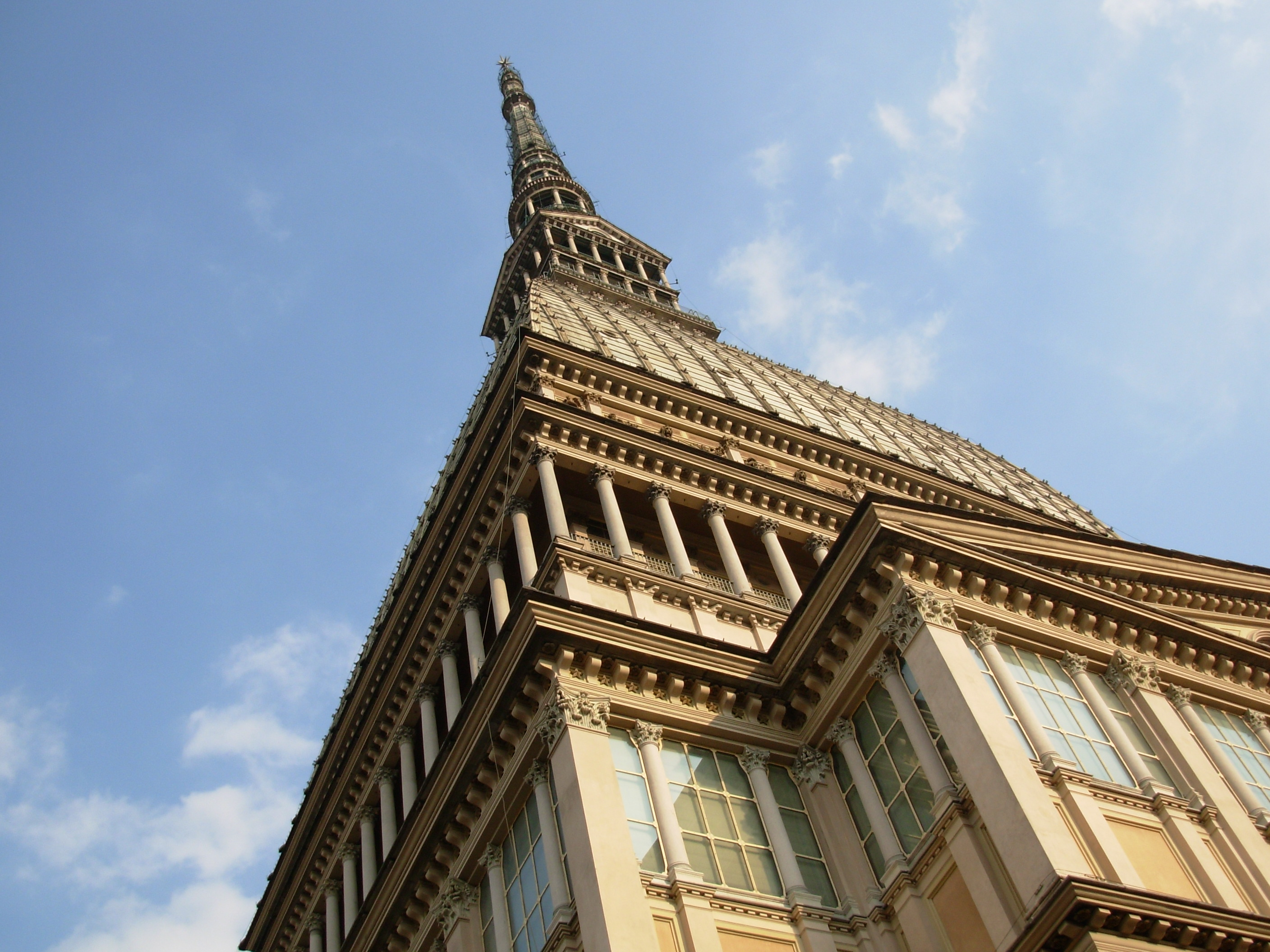
Mole Antonelliana, an example of eclectic architecture

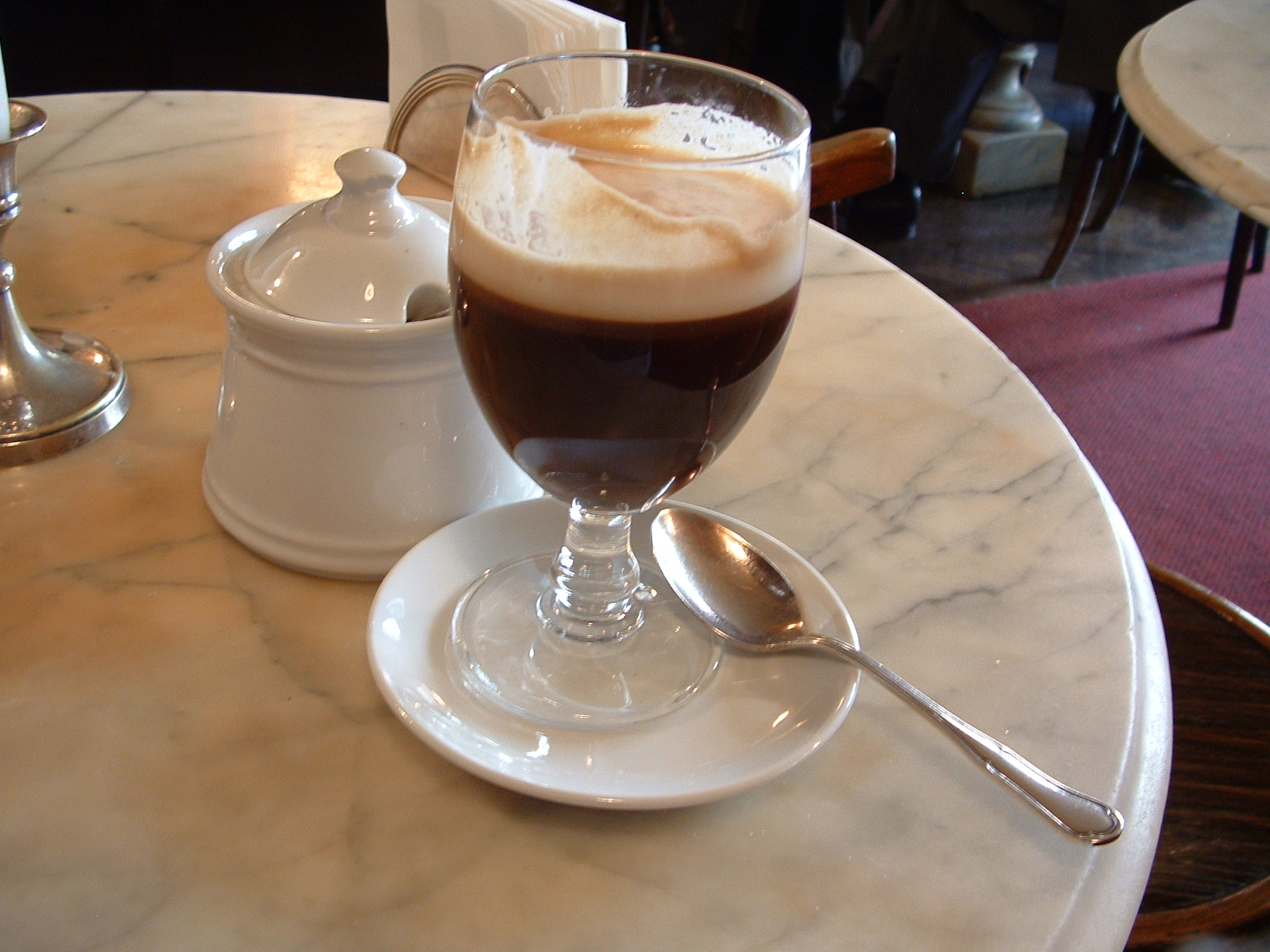
Bicerin, a traditional hot drink originally from Turin

Culture of Turin

- Architecture of Turin
  - Skyscrapers in Turin
    - Piedmont Region Headquarters
    - Torre Intesa Sanpaolo
    - Torre Littoria
- Cuisine of Turin
  - Bicerin
- Languages of Turin
  - Piedmontese language
- Media in Turin
  - Newspapers
    - La Stampa
  - Radio stations in Turin
- People from Turin
- Symbols of Turin

=== Art in Turin ===
==== Cinema of Turin ====
- Italian Environmental Film Festival
- National Museum of Cinema
- Torino Film Festival

==== Music of Turin ====
Teatro Regio

- RAI National Symphony Orchestra
- Turin Conservatory

==== Theatre of Turin ====
- Teatro Carignano
- Teatro Regio

=== Events and traditions in Turin ===
- Prima Esposizione Internazionale d'Arte Decorativa Moderna
- Terra Madre Salone del Gusto
- Turin Auto Show
- Turin International Book Fair
- VIEW Conference

=== Religion in Turin ===
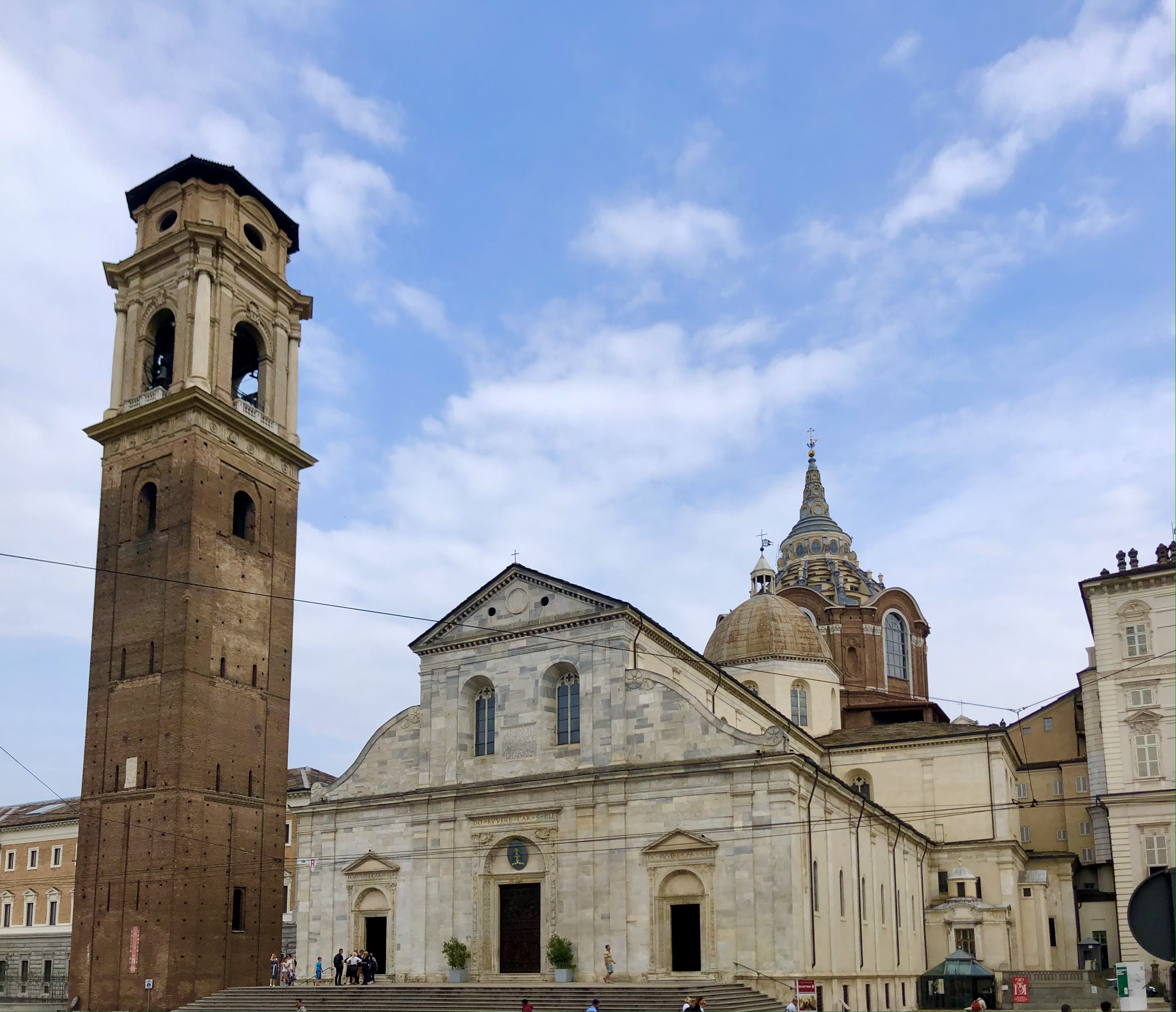
Turin Cathedral

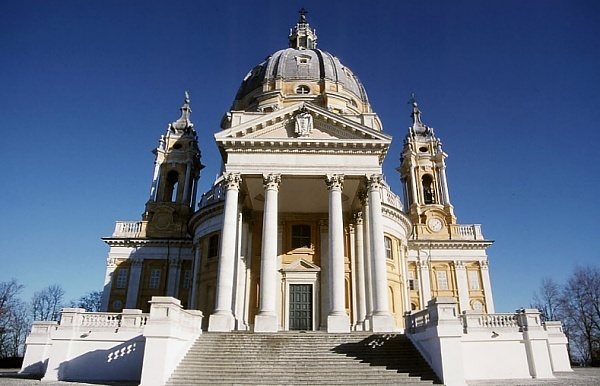
Basilica of Superga

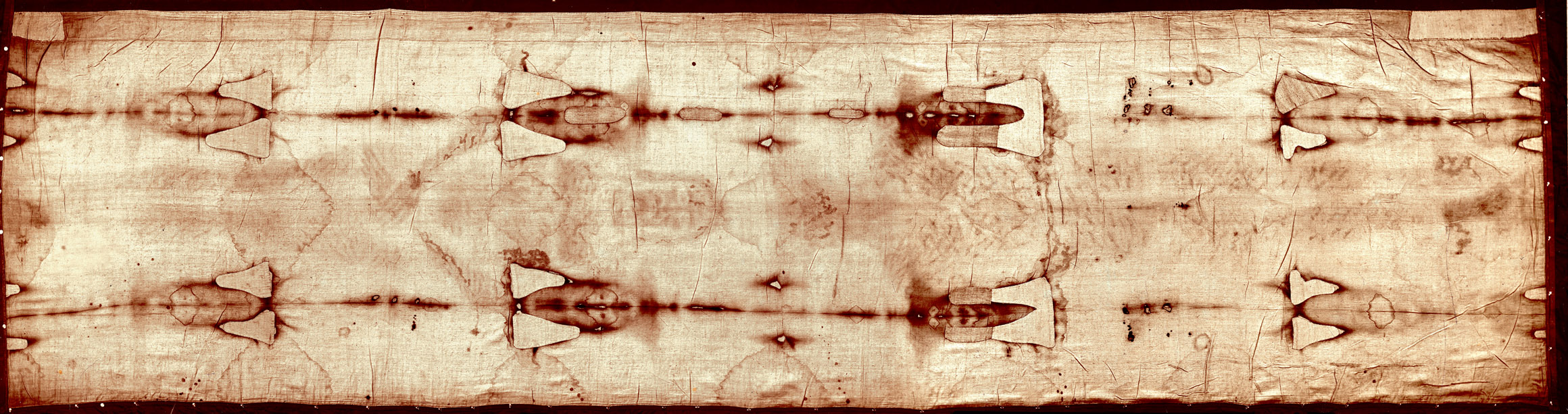
The Shroud of Turin, kept in the Chapel of the Holy Shroud in Turin

- Christianity in Turin
  - Catholicism in Turin
    - Roman Catholic Archdiocese of Turin
- Judaism in Turin
  - History of the Jews in Turin

==== Churches in Turin ====
- Turin Cathedral
  - Chapel of the Holy Shroud
    - Shroud of Turin
      - History of the Shroud of Turin
- Basilica of Corpus Domini
- Basilica of Our Lady Help of Christians, Turin
- Basilica of Superga
- Church of San Lorenzo
- Gran Madre di Dio
- Madonna del Pilone
- Monte dei Cappuccini
- San Carlo Borromeo
- San Dalmazzo
- San Filippo Neri
- San Francesco d'Assisi
- Santa Teresa
- Santuario della Consolata

=== Sports in Turin ===
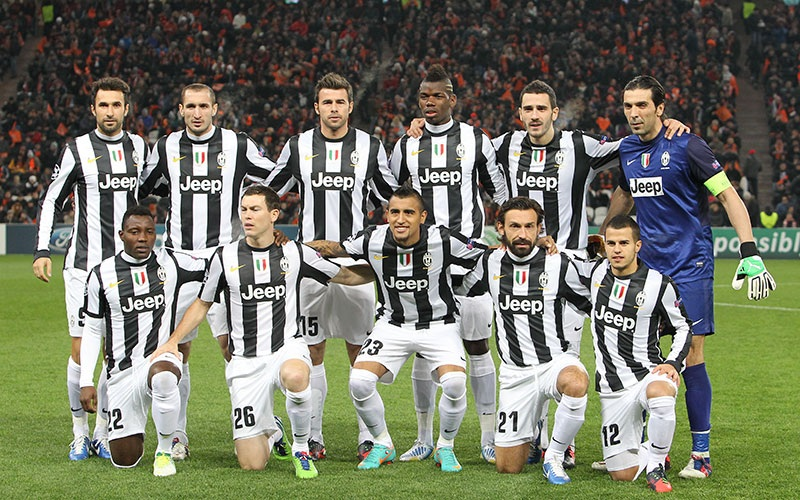
The Juventus FC team in 2012

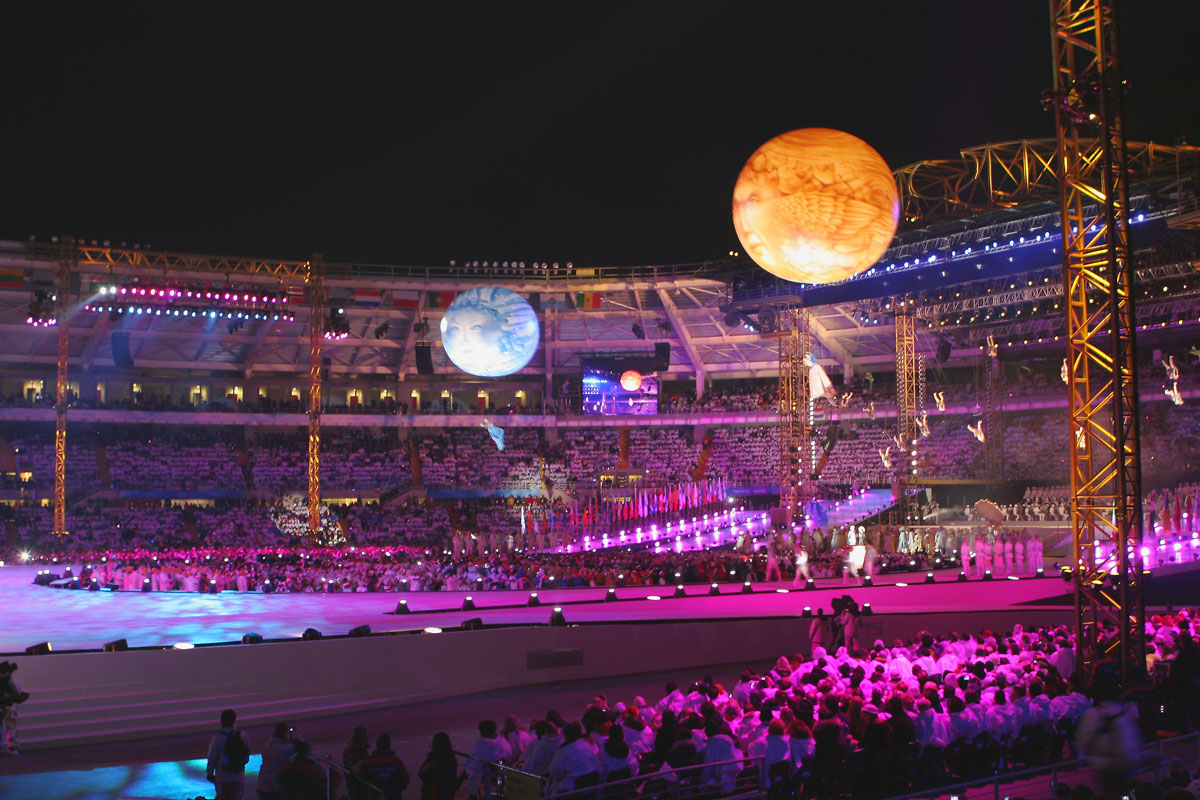
2006 Winter Olympics, the opening ceremony

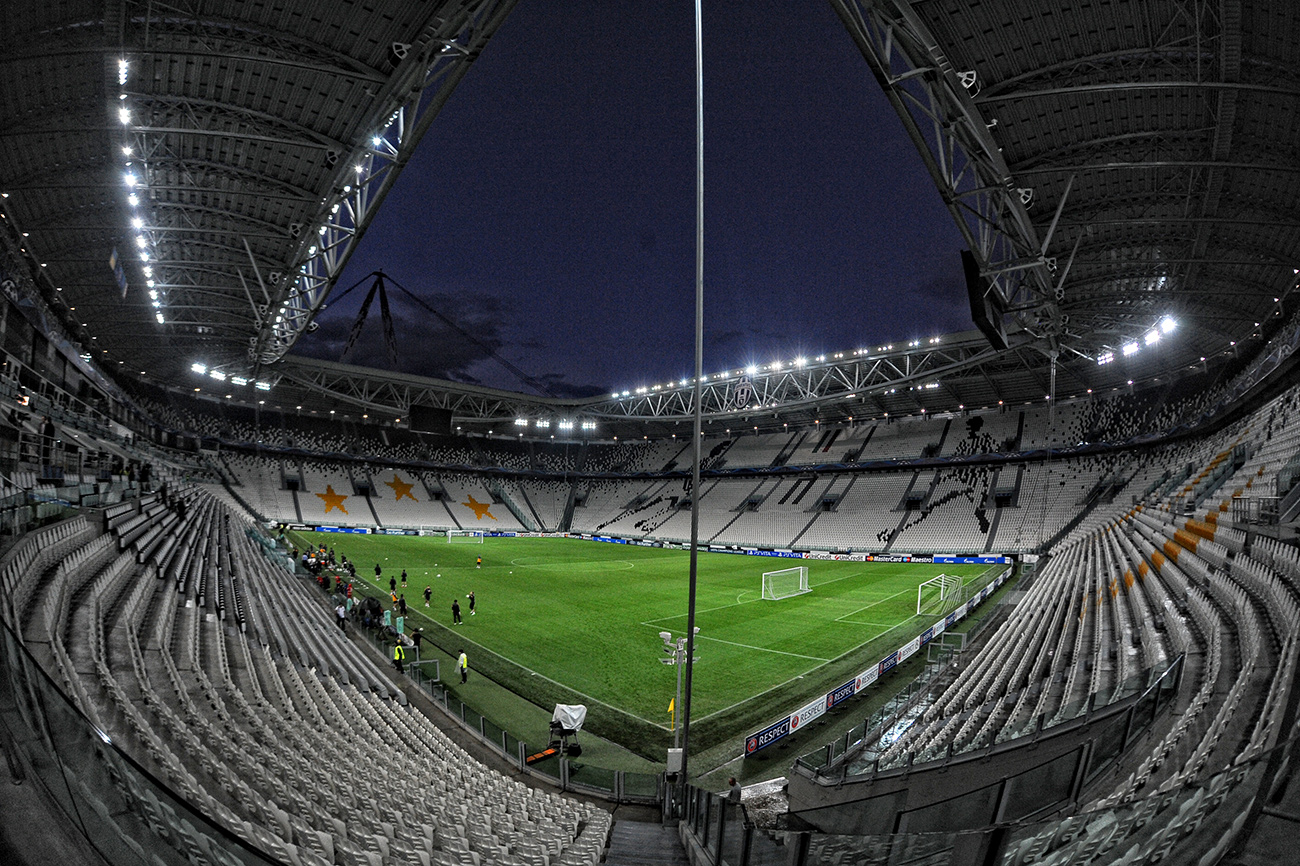
Juventus Stadium

Sports in Turin

- Basketball in Turin
  - Auxilium Pallacanestro Torino
- Football in Turin
  - Association football in Turin
    - Juventus FC
      - Juventus F.C.–A.C. Milan rivalry
      - Juventus F.C. and the Italy national football team
      - Juventus F.C. ultras
      - History of Juventus F.C.
      - List of Juventus F.C. players
    - Torino F.C.
  - Derby della Mole
- Olympics in Turin
  - 2006 Winter Olympics
    - 2006 Winter Olympics medal table
    - Palasport Olimpico and Stadio Comunale area in Turin
- Running in Turin
  - Turin Marathon
- Sports venues in Turin
  - Juventus Stadium
  - Oval Lingotto
  - Pala Alpitour
  - PalaTorino
  - Stadio Filadelfia
  - Stadio Olimpico Grande Torino
  - Torino Palavela

== Economy and infrastructure of Turin ==
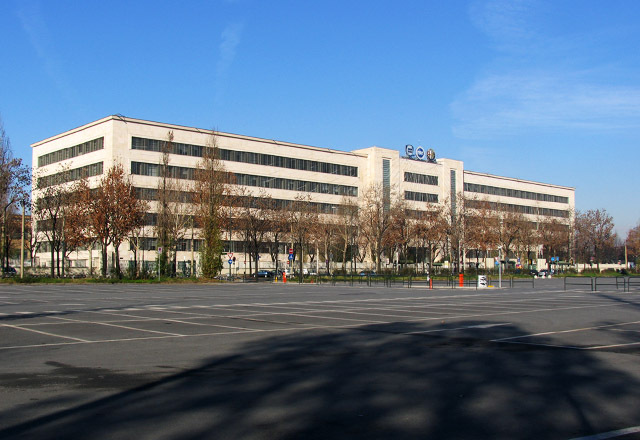
The Fiat Mirafiori plant, where the Maserati Levante is produced and assembled by Maserati

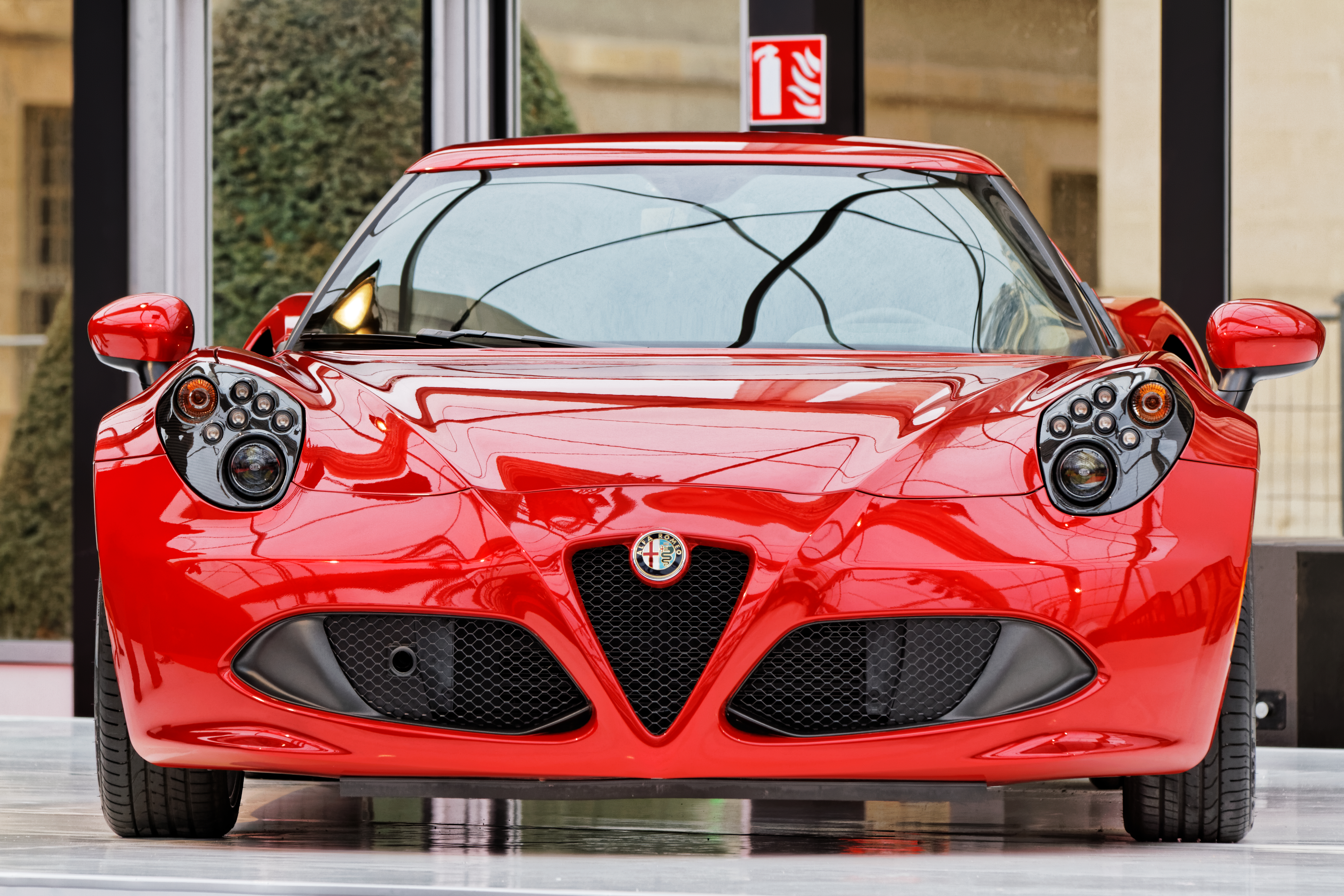
Alfa Romeo 4C, a mid-engined, lightweight, sports car

Economy of Turin

- Aerospace industry
  - Avio
- Automotive industry in Turin
  - Abarth
  - Fiat Automobiles
    - Alfa Romeo
    - Lancia
    - Maserati
  - Iveco
- Banking in Turin
  - Intesa Sanpaolo
- Restaurants and cafés in Turin
  - Caffè Fiorio
    - Società del Whist
- Tourism in Turin
  - Residences of the Royal House of Savoy
  - Shroud of Turin

=== Transportation in Turin ===
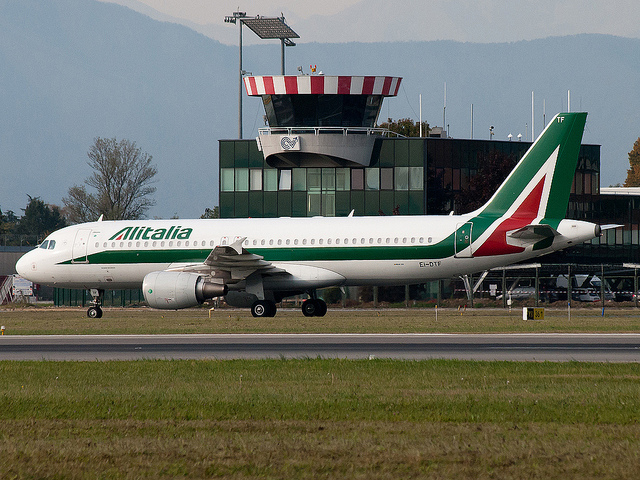
Alitalia Airbus A320 taxiing at Turin Airport in front of the control tower

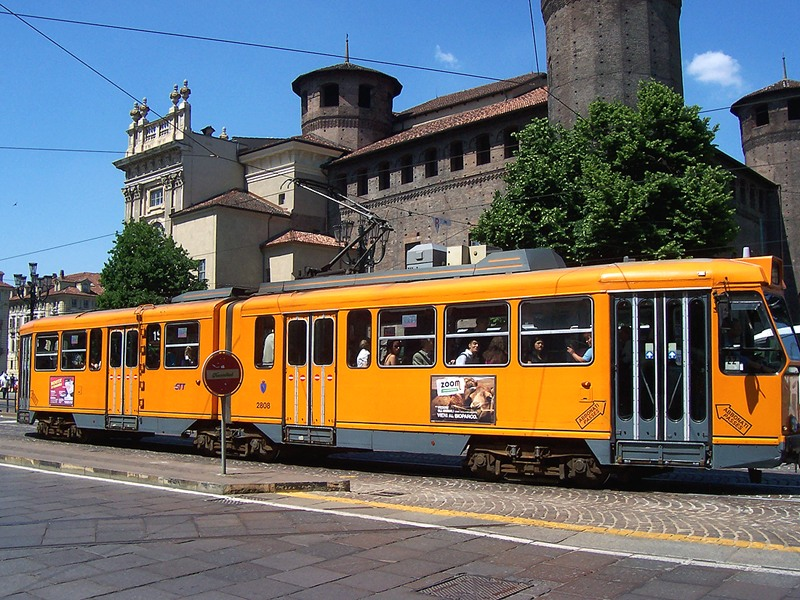
Tram in Piazza Castello

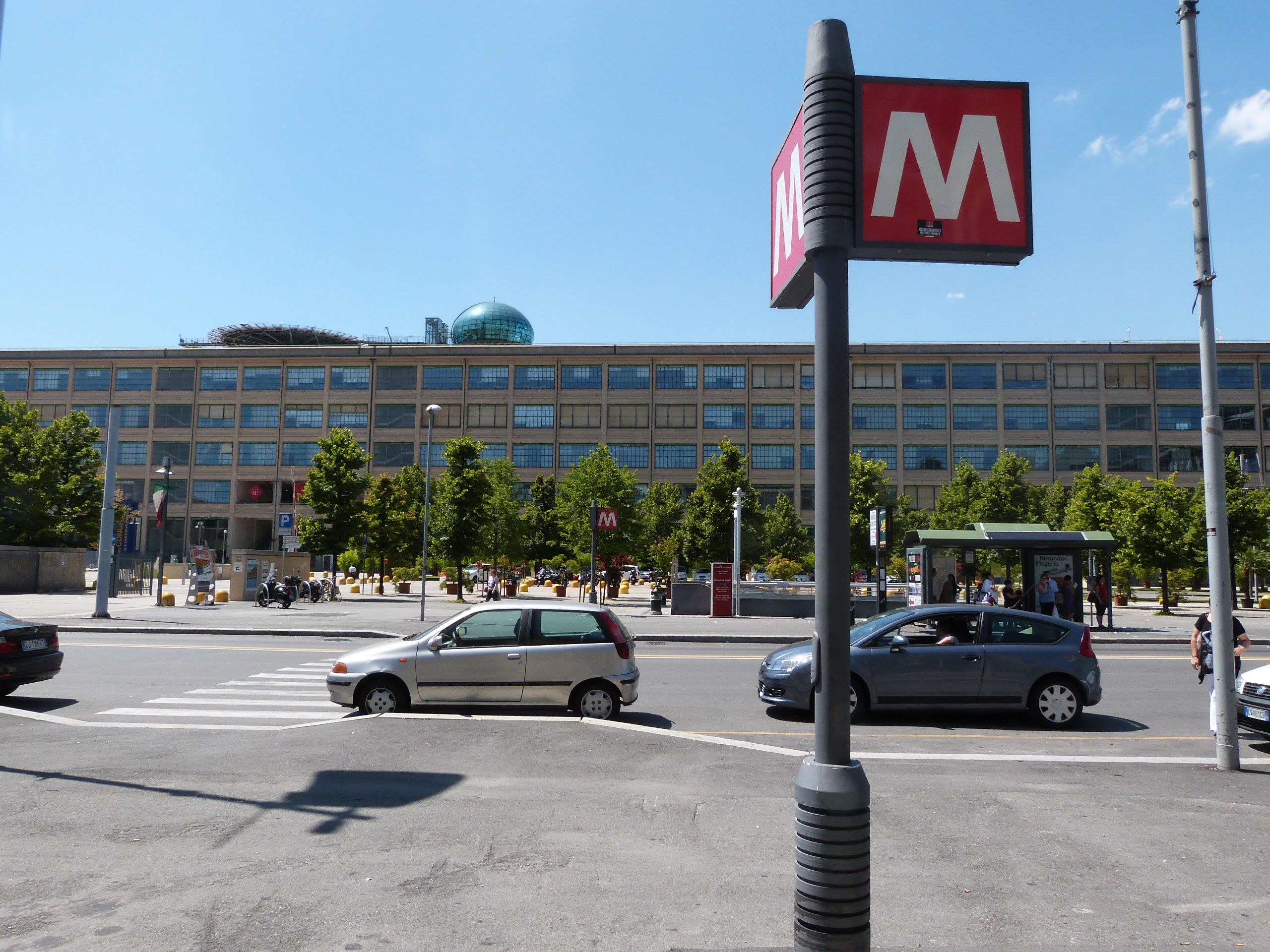
Lingotto metro station

Transportation in Turin

- Gruppo Torinese Trasporti
- Società Azionaria Gestione Aeroporto Torino

Airports in Turin

- Turin-Aeritalia Airport
- Turin Airport

==== Rail transport in Turin ====
Turin metropolitan railway service

- Line SFM1
- Line SFM2
- Line SFM3
- Line SFM4
- Line SFM7
- Line SFMA
- Line SFMB
- Railway stations in Turin
  - Torino Lingotto railway station
  - Torino Porta Nuova railway station
  - Torino Porta Susa railway station
  - Torino Stura railway station
- Trams in Turin
  - Sassi–Superga tramway

===== Turin Metro =====
Turin Metro

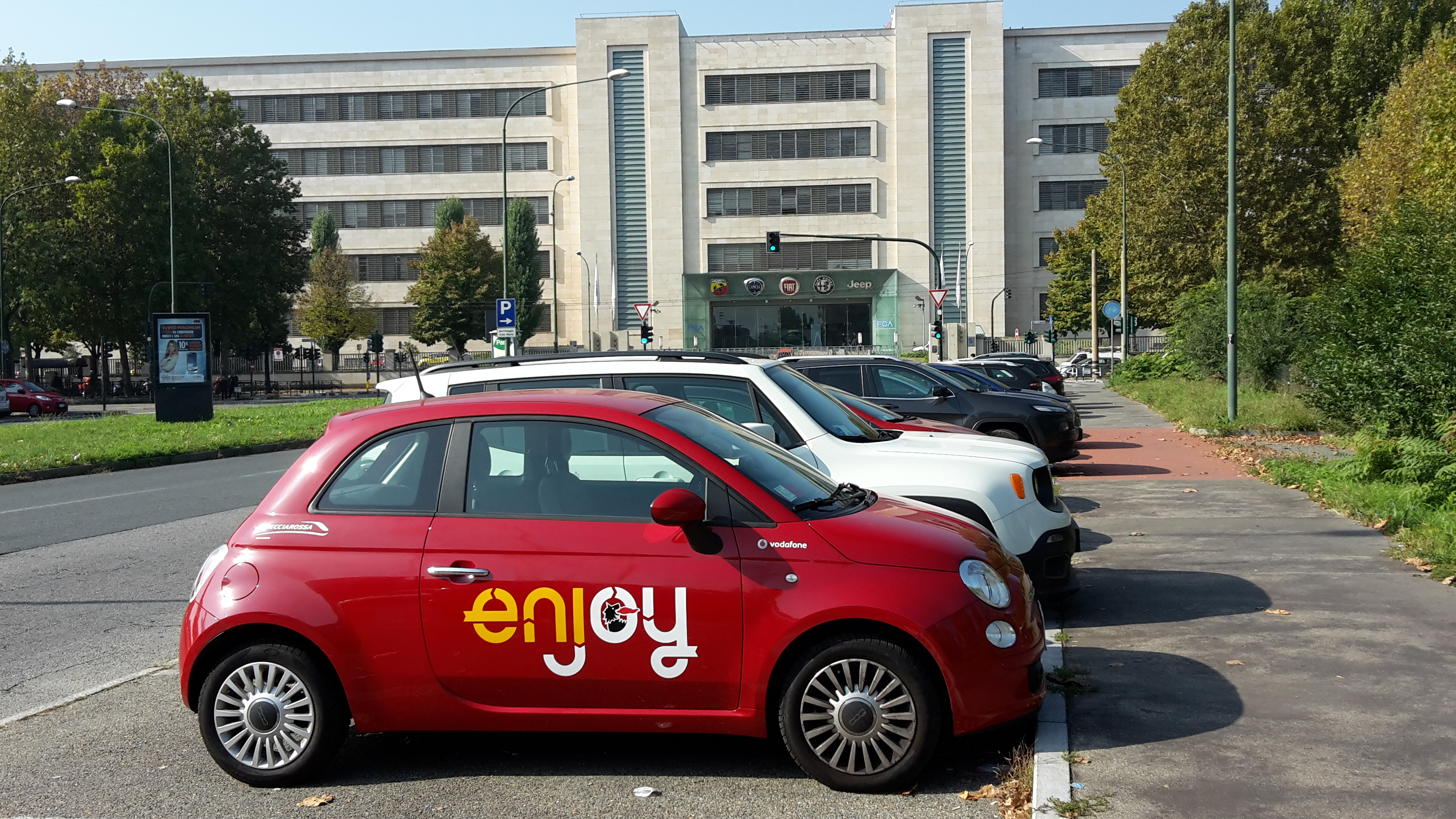
Enjoy Fiat 500 at Turin Mirafiori

- List of Turin metro stations

===== Car sharing in Turin =====
- car2Go (Smart)
- Enjoy (Fiat 500)
- BlueTorino (Bluecar)

===== Public bicycle sharing system in Turin =====
- ToBike

== Education in Turin ==
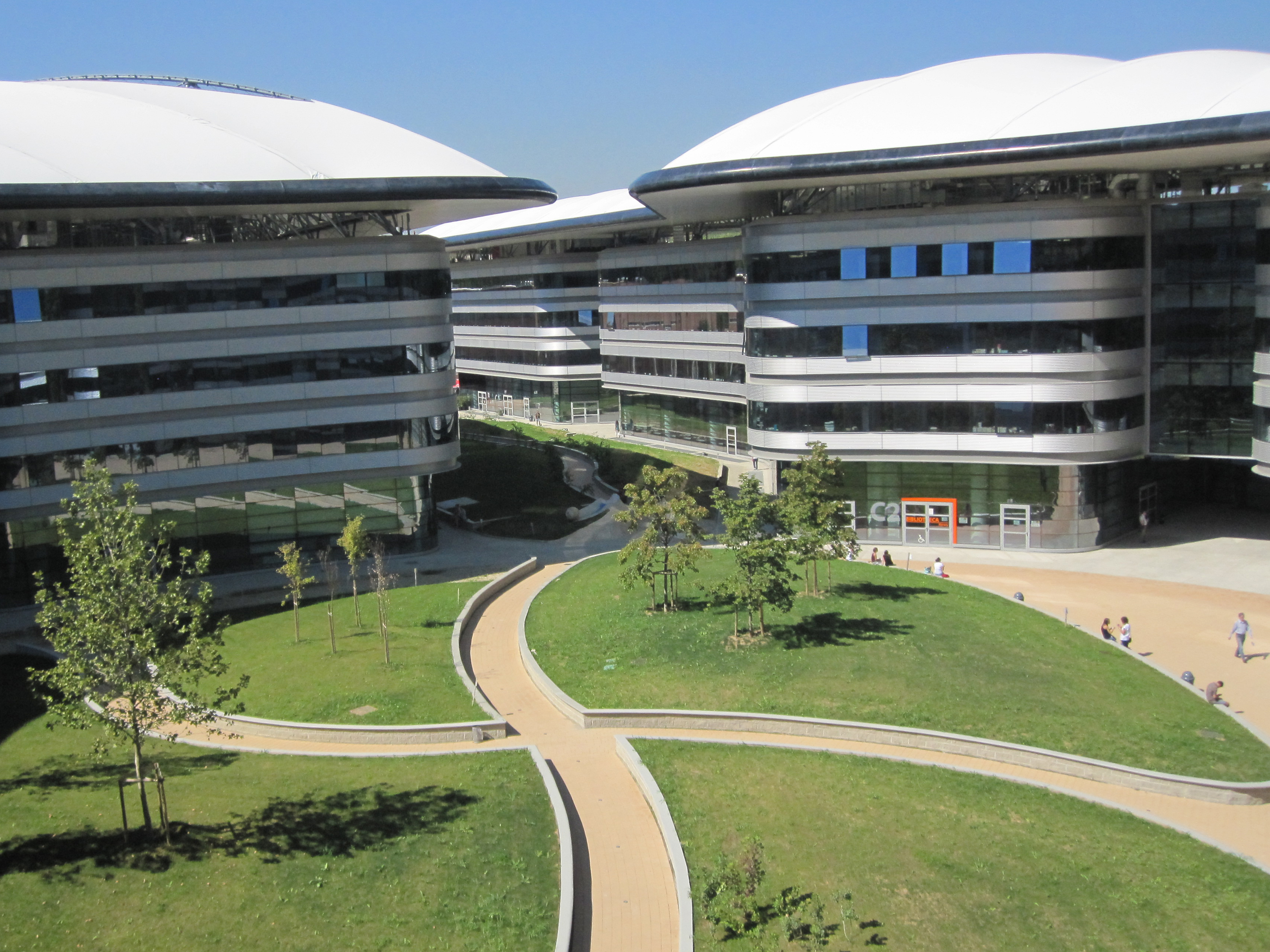
University of Turin - Campus Luigi Einaudi, home of the University of Turin Department of Law

Education in Turin

- Public education in Turin
  - Universities in Turin
    - University of Turin
      - University of Turin Department of Law
        - Department of Law people
    - Polytechnic University of Turin (partly-public)
  - High schools in Turin
    - Liceo classico Cavour

== Healthcare in Turin ==
Hospitals in Turin

- CTO Hospital

== See also ==
- Outline of geography
