= Joseph-Célestin Dumonthier =

French gunsmith and inventor

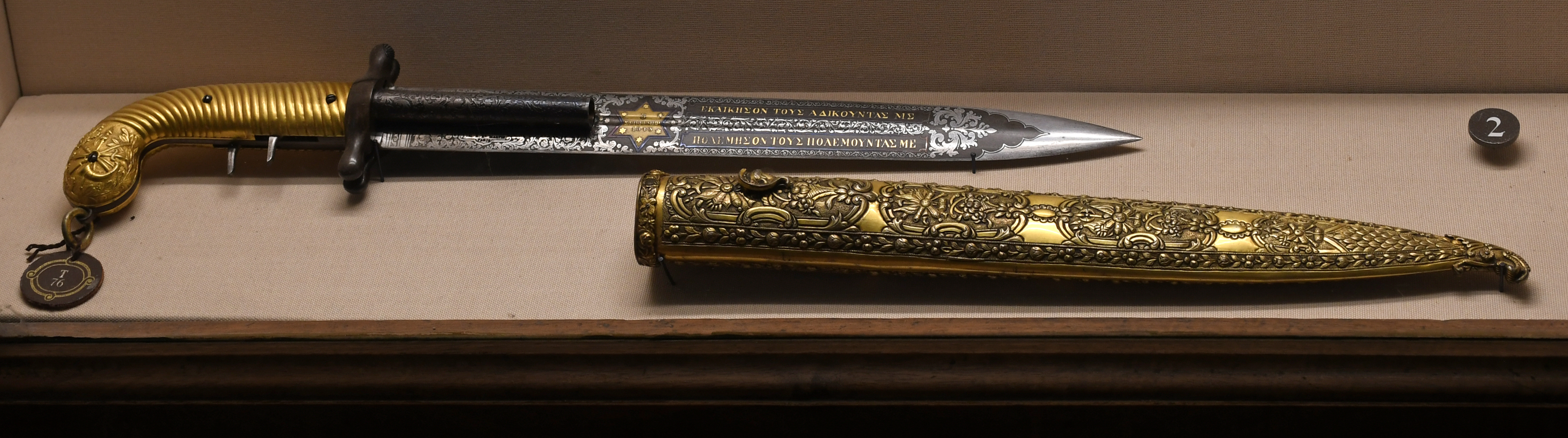
Decorated hunting knife with caplock firearm by Dumonthier et Chartron in the Royal Armoury of Turin

Joseph-Célestin Dumonthier was a French gunsmith and inventor active in the late 19th century. He was known for novelty firearms such as a gun built into a walking stick, patented in 1876, or a bladed revolver, patented in 1840.
