= Sports in Turin =

Sports in Turin have a rich heritage as the home to two historically significant football teams: Juventus FC (founded in 1897) and Torino FC (founded in 1906). Juventus has the larger fan base, especially in southern Italy and worldwide, while Torino enjoys a more localised support. The two clubs contest the oldest derby in Italy, the Derby della Mole or the Turin derby.

== Football (soccer) ==
Juventus is Italy's most successful football club and one of the most winning teams in the world. It ranks twelfth in the list of the world's clubs with the most official international titles (sixth between European clubs). and was the first in association football history — remaining the only one in the world (as of 2022, after the first UEFA Europa Conference League final) — to have won all possible official continental competitions and the world title.

The Stadio delle Alpi, one of the host stadiums for the 1990 FIFA World Cup, was demolished in 2006 to make way for Juventus' owned ground, the Juventus Stadium, inaugurated in 2011. The other city's club, Torino, currently uses the Stadio Olimpico, property of the Comune of Turin, one of the host stadiums for the 1934 FIFA World Cup and the venue of the XX Winter Olympics.

Torino FC was founded by breakaways from Juventus and was one of the most formidable teams in the Serie A during the 1940s (before and after World War II), hence the nickname Il Grande Torino ("The Great Torino"). In 1949, in the Superga air disaster, a plane carrying almost the whole Torino F.C. team (at that time the most important team in Italy and known as the Grande Torino) crashed into the Basilica of Superga in the Turin hills. Valentino Mazzola was among those who perished in the accident.

== Other sports ==
The C.U.S. Torino volleyball team won the domestic league four times and, in the 1979–80 season, the Volleyball European Champion's Cup. It was the first team from western Europe to win this competition. In the 1990s the team was dismantled as a result of financial issues. There is also the largest rugby team of the city by the same name, CUS Torino.

The most important basketball team is the Auxilium Torino, founded in 2009, playing in the Italian LBA since 2015–16 Season. In 2018 Auxilium Torino went to win its first Italian Basketball Cup ever.

== Events ==
Turin hosted the 2006 Winter Olympics from 10 February 2006, through 26 February 2006. Turin, with a population of over 865,000 and a metropolitan area of 1.7 million, is the largest city to have ever hosted a Winter Olympics and was the largest metropolitan area to host them at the time. The title of largest metropolitan area to host the Winter Olympics fell to Vancouver, British Columbia, Canada, (2.3 million) when that city hosted the XXI Olympic Winter Games.

Other events hosted by the city include the Universiade (1933 IUG; summer: 1959 and 1970; winter: 2007), 1934 European Athletics Championships, 1979 European Cup (athletics), 1997 IAAF World Cross Country Championships, 2008 Rhythmic Gymnastics European Championships and the 2009 European Athletics Indoor Championships.

In recognition of its rich sporting tradition, the City was awarded with the title of European Capital of Sport 2015. The candidature sees the City strongly committed to increasing sports activities and at the forefront of new technologies thanks to an agreement signed with the Interfaculty School of Motor Sciences of Turin aimed to the dissemination of the project We-Sport.

The FISA (International Rowing Federation) was founded in Turin in 1892.

Turin was also the home of the Valentino Park motor racing circuit.

The Juventus Stadium hosted the 2014 UEFA Europa League Final. This was the first time the city hosted a seasonal UEFA club competition's single-match final.

Turin will host the 2025 Special Olympics World Winter Games.
