= Line SFMB =

Commuter rail line in Piedmont, Italy

Line B

Overview
- Service type: Commuter rail
- Status: Operational
- Locale: Province of Turin
- First service: 9 June 2013
- Current operator(s): Trenitalia

Route
- Termini: Cavallermaggiore; Bra
- Stops: 3

Technical
- Rolling stock: Minuetto
- Track gauge: 1,435 mm (4 ft 8 1/2 in)
- Track owner(s): Turin Metropolitan Railway Service

Line SFMB was a commuter rail line that is part of the Turin Metropolitan Railway Service, and links Cavallermaggiore to Bra.

The line was opened on 9 June 2013.
