= Società del Whist =

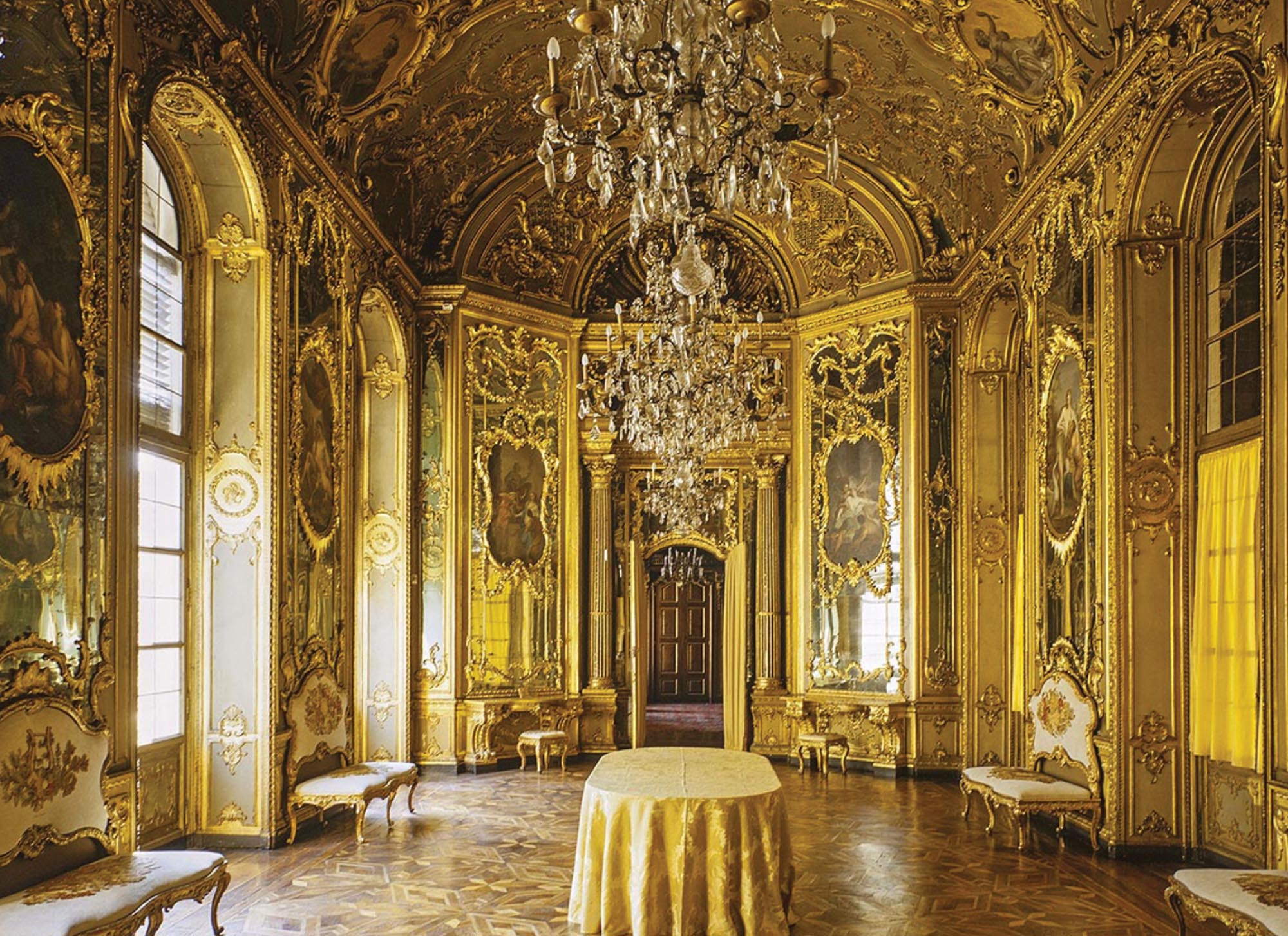
Whist Club Turin interior

La Società del Whist, modelled broadly on the gentleman's clubs of London and their Parisian analogues, was founded in March 1841 in the fashionable Caffè Fiorio in Turin, Italy, by Count Cavour and a number of his friends.

By contrast to previous clubs formed among Turin’s social elite, the Whist Club admitted upper middle class professionals—bankers, lawyers and academics—alongside the titled aristocracy. Nevertheless, at least ten of the forty founding members had ancestors who had belonged to the city's Patriottica Nobile Società del Casino: a club which had been not only strictly limited to the nobility but in effect to its more exclusive echelons, virtually excluding those whose titles post-dated 1722.

In 1947 it merged with the Accademia Filarmonica.
