= Porta Palatina =

Roman Age city gate in Turin, Italy

Coordinates: 45.0750°N 7.6847°E

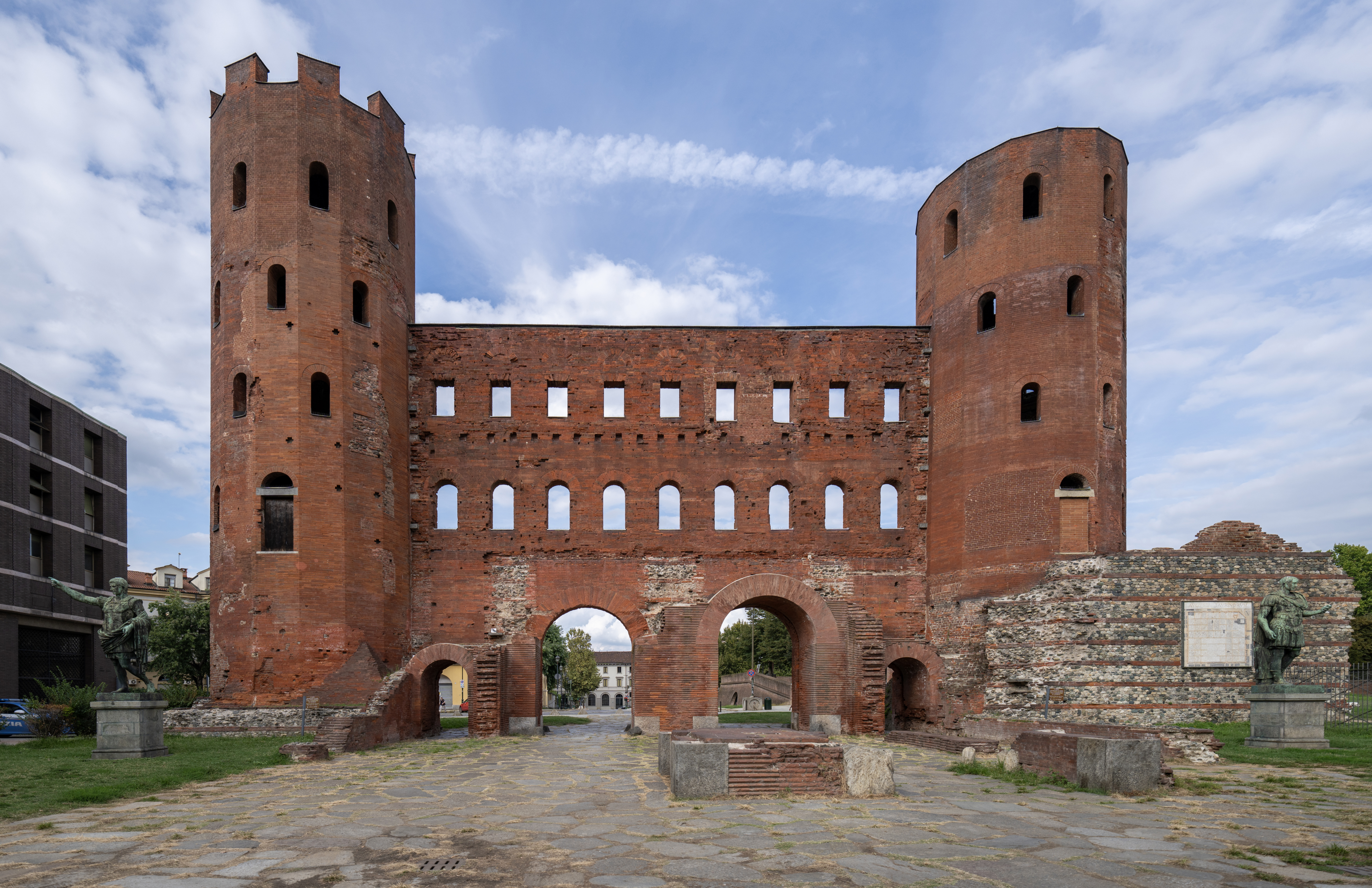
The Palatine Gate

The Palatine Gate (Italian: Porta Palatina; Piedmontese: Pòrta Palatin-a) is a Roman Age city gate located in Turin, Italy. The gate provided access through the city walls of Julia Augusta Taurinorum (modern Turin) from the North side and, as a result, it constituted the Porta Principalis Dextra of the old town.

The Palatine Gate represents the primary archaeological evidence of the city's Roman phase. It is one of the world's best-preserved 1st-century AD Roman gateways. Together with the ancient theatre's remains, located a short distance away, it is part of the so-called Archaeological Park, which opened in 2006.

== Etymology ==
The name Porta Palatina literally refers to a palazzo ('palace') placed near the gate, but it is not clear what palace is here referred to.

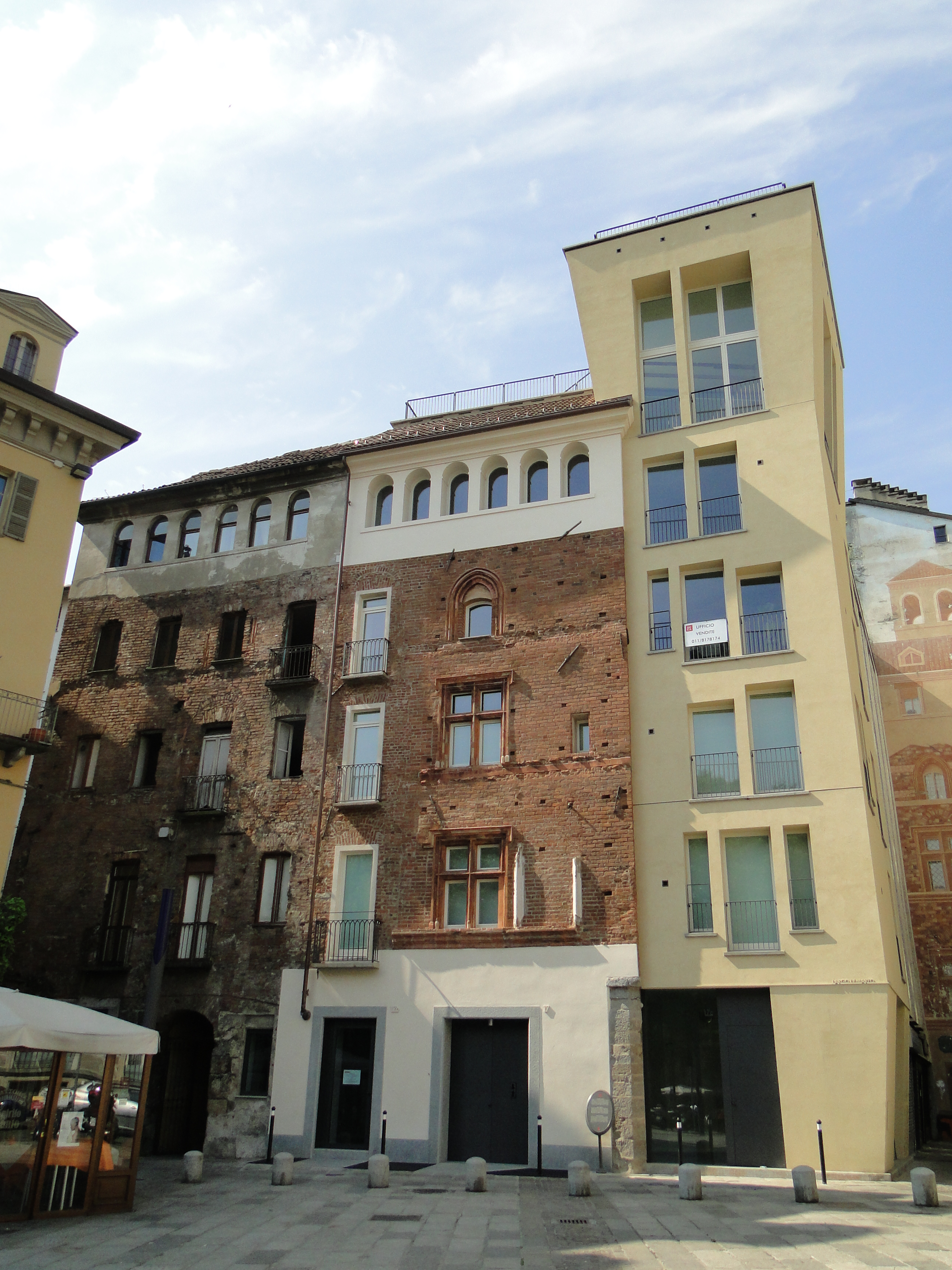
The former House of the Senate

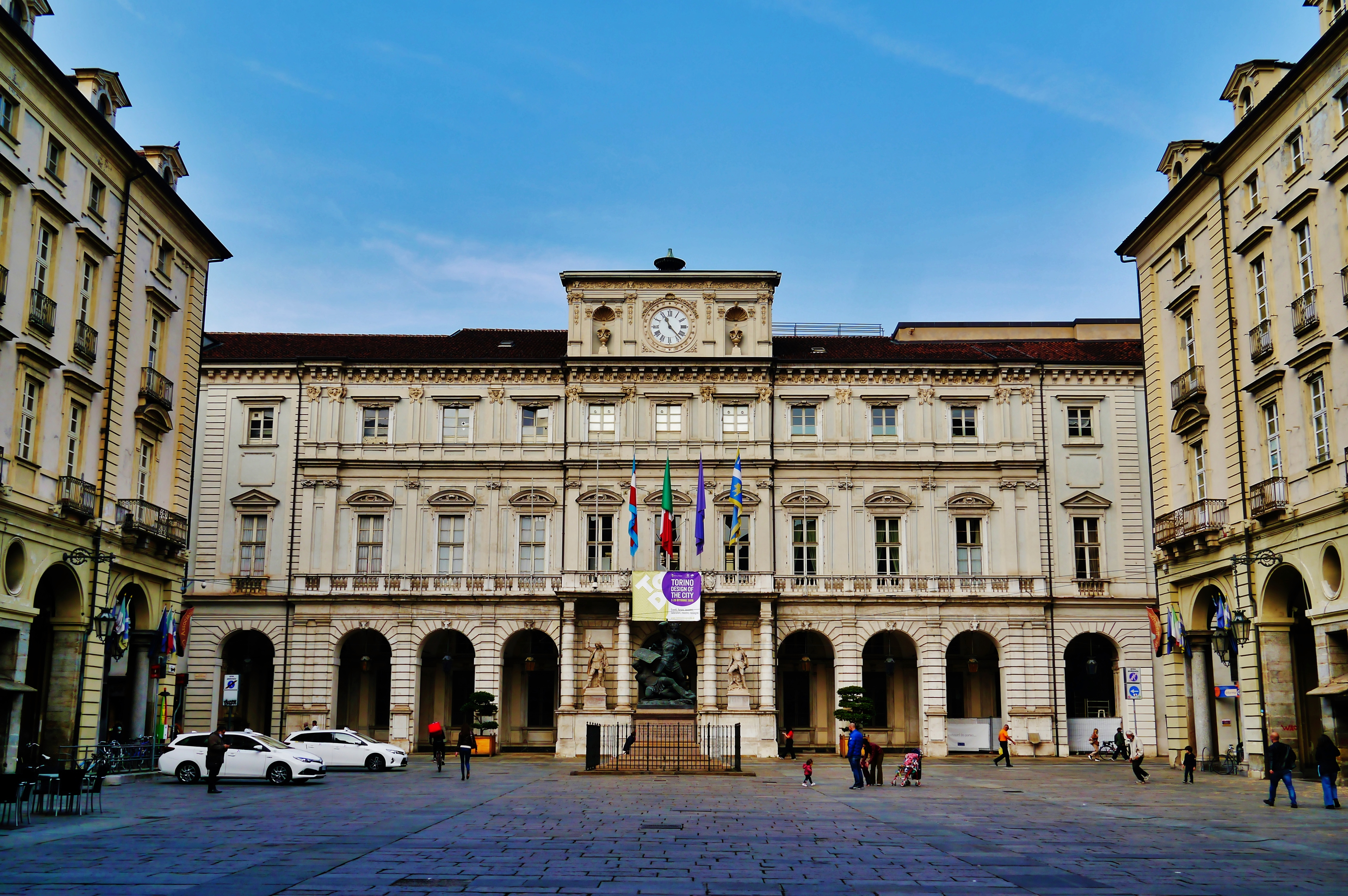
Palazzo di Città, the City Hall of Turin

The most trusted theory suggests that it might be either the former Casa del Senato (House of the Senate), a medieval palace located very close to the Palatine Gate, inside the city walls, (Note: This palace is thought to have hosted some notable historical figures, such as Charlemagne (in 773), Charles the Bald, Lothair (in 947), and Frederick Barbarossa. However, we have no documentation confirming these events with certainty.) or perhaps the Palazzo di Città (City Palace), the city hall of Turin, placed not far from the gate as well (though a little farther than the old House of the Senate).

A second theory hints to the presence of an alleged adjacent amphitheatre built near present-day Borgo Dora, a historical neighbourhood developing right outside the old city walls (north of the Porta Palatina). (Note: The presence of an amphitheatre is suggested by the particular conformation of the nearby Via Borgo Dora, which features an elliptical track that could be the residual evidence of a circus.) This facility might rapidly have fallen into disrepair and, as a result, it might simply have been dubbed palazzo by the ancients.

Over the centuries, however, the Palatine Gate was also known by some other names, such as Porta Comitale (Count's Gate, allegedly referring to a count's residence), Porta Doranea or Porta Doranica (since it led to the Dora river) and later as Porta Palazzo (a clear synonym of Porta Palatina). (Note: To this day, the name Porta Palazzo lives on in the nearby mercato di Porta Palazzo, the historical open market of the neighbourhood which is also the biggest one of its kind in Europe.)

== Features ==
The Porta Principalis Dextra served as an access to the cardo maximus, currently identified in Via Porta Palatina and Via San Tommaso. Its impressive remains are currently visible at the center of an open area, today's Piazza Cesare Augusto.

Quite similar to the ancient Porta Decumana, built into the medieval structure of the present-day Palazzo Madama, the Palatine Gate represents an example of a typical Roman gate facing a cavaedium (quadrangular courtyard on the inside of the city walls), the remains of which are placed in front of the gate. (Note: Small traces of a statio are left to testify the presence of the cavaedium, which was about twelve yards wide as we can assume nowadays.) Erected on a square base, the two angular towers are more than thirty metres high and feature a sixteen-sided structure. The central body, namely the interturrio, is about twenty metres long and is characterized by two orders of windows, the lower one composed of arch windows and the upper one made up of jack arch windows. The underlying portion features four entryways: the central ones are larger and taller and are vehicle accessible, while the two entryways to the sides are narrower and shorter and serve as pedestrian passageways. The grooves along the entryways' inner walls suggest the original presence of the so-called cateractae, an alleged system of gate gratings operated from the upper floor.

On the ground near the gate is still part of the guardhouse added in the Roman period, on which one can see the furrows on the stones caused by the transit of wagons.

The pair of bronze statues depicting Augustus Caesar and Julius Caesar are not the original statues but copies from the last, radical restoration of 1934. However, they are objects of discussion as they were incorrectly placed in the internal area occupied by the statio and not outside the gate, where they would possibly have more relevance.

== History ==
=== From antiquity to the 16th century ===
Built in the 1st century during the Augustan Age or the Flavian Age, the Porta Principalis Dextra may predate the construction of the city walls and was perhaps built on the location of an earlier Republican Age gate. (Note: Surveys carried out between 1936 and 1938 revealed the remnants of structures that lead to assume the presence of an earlier Republican Age gate.)

This facility served as a city gate for a long time and was turned into a castrum in the 11th century, although it lost the internal structure of the cavaedium over the centuries. In 1404, after centuries of incursions and partial decay, the western tower was rebuilt, and both towers were completed with battlements for defensive purposes.

=== The 18th century ===
The Palatine Gate was supposed to be torn down in the early 18th century, pursuant to the urban renewal process started by Vittorio Amedeo II. However, the dismantling was not implemented thanks to the intervention of the architect and engineer Antonio Bertola, who convinced the duke to preserve the ancient architectural work.

In 2006, the City of Turin started a restoration of the archaeological area, with the intent to improve the park, make the towers accessible to the public, and build an underground parking for the carts of the nearby Porta Palazzo open market.

== Sources ==
- Torricella, Giuseppe – Torino e le sue vie, Turin, Le Livre Précieux, 1971.
- Cardoza, A. e Symcox, G. – Storia di Torino, Turin, Einaudi, 2006.
- Luisa Papotti, La Porta Palatina. L'intervento di restauro degli anni novanta, in Liliana Mercando (a cura di), Archeologia a Torino. Dall'età preromana all'Alto Medioevo, Umberto Allemandi & C., Turin, 2003, pp. 89–96.
- Claudio Franzoni, Le mura di Torino: riuso e "potenza delle tradizioni", in Enrico Castelnuovo (a cura di), Torino. Prima capitale d'Italia, I luoghi dell'arte, Istituto della Enciclopedia Italiana Treccani, Rome, 2010, pp. 13–22.
- Gruppo Archeologico Torinese, Guida archeologica di Torino, Turin, p. 102.
- Politecnico di Torino Dipartimento Casa-Città, Beni culturali ambientali nel Comune di Torino, Società degli Ingegneri e degli Architetti in Torino, Torino 1984, p. 286.
