= Economy of Turin =

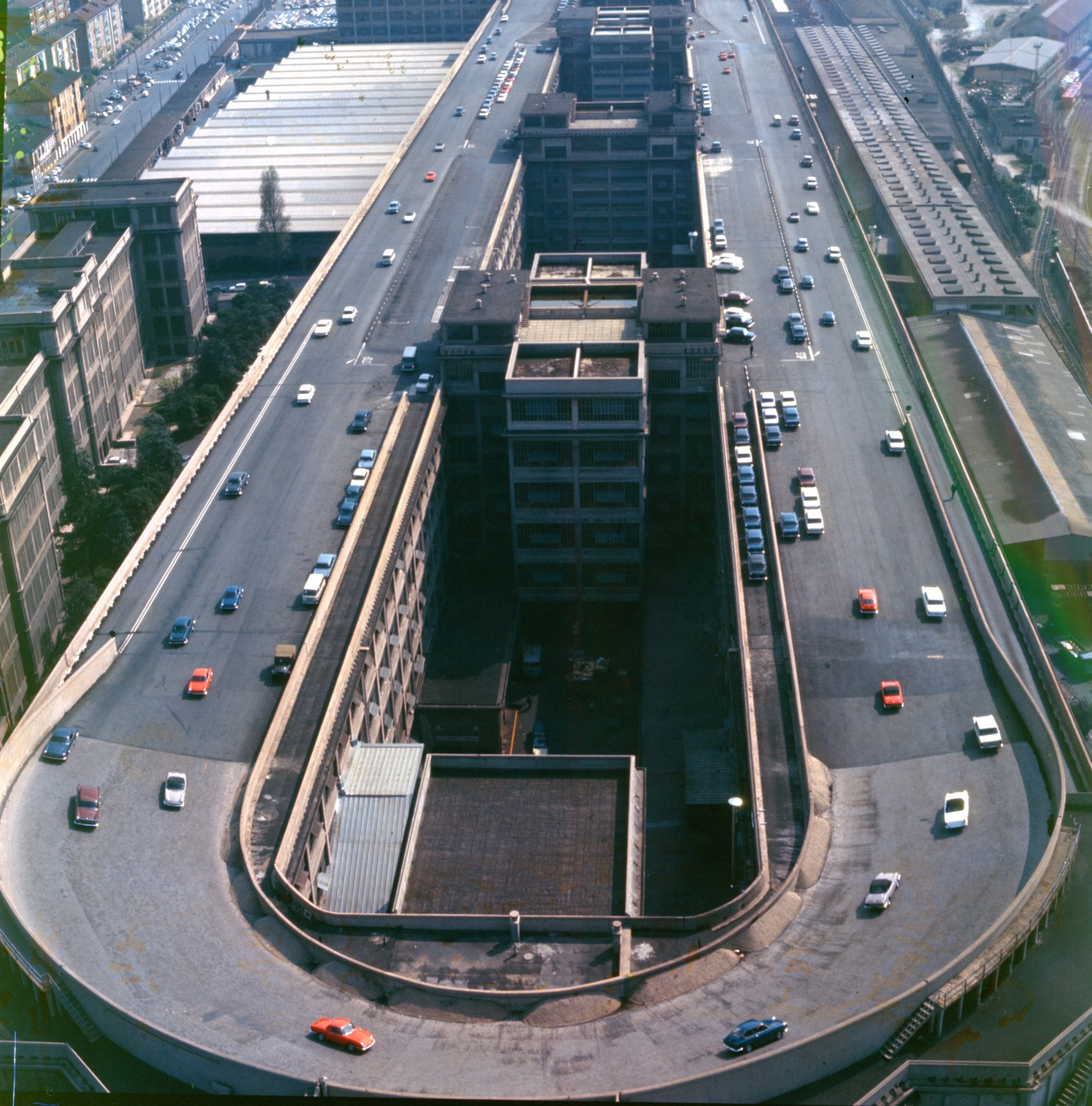
Rooftop test track at Fiat's Lingotto factory, 1966.

Turin is Italy's fourth largest economic center after Rome, Milan and Naples. In 2004, Turin produced a GDP of €25.4 billion, 2.2% of the national figure. The Turin greater metropolitan area produced €44 billion, 3.8% of the Italian GDP. Turin's taxable income was 12.455 billion euros.

== Industry ==
Lavazza headquarter Nuvola, 2017.

The Province of Turin, is Italy's second largest export market (in terms of value of exports) with a share of 5.2% of the national total. Its industries include manufacturing and engineering; production of confectionery and chocolate; and banking and telecommunications. There has also been growth in construction, tourism and service industries.

Founded in 1826, Caffarel (the inventor of gianduja) is the oldest chocolate factory in the world.

Other prominent companies in the area include: Fiat, Seat Pagine Gialle, EIAR (now RAI), Olivetti, Lavazza, Cirio, Reale Mutua Assicurazioni, Toro Assicurazioni Lancia, Italdesign Giugiaro, Ghia, Italgas, Bertone, Pininfarina, Martini & Rossi, Seven, Kappa, Superga, Carlo Pignatelli.

National banks with a presence in Turin include Intesa Sanpaolo and UniCredit Group.

In 2006, there were 231,645 businesses registered in the Province of Turin and 112,255 in the city. These numbers represent just under 50% of all those in the Piedmont region and 4% of the Italian total.

There were 21,987 foreign entrepreneurs, with the majority being non-EU.

Difficulties which industry in Turin has faced include a long phase of industrial restructuring; a crisis in Fiat; and transfer of production to developing nations.

=== Automotive ===
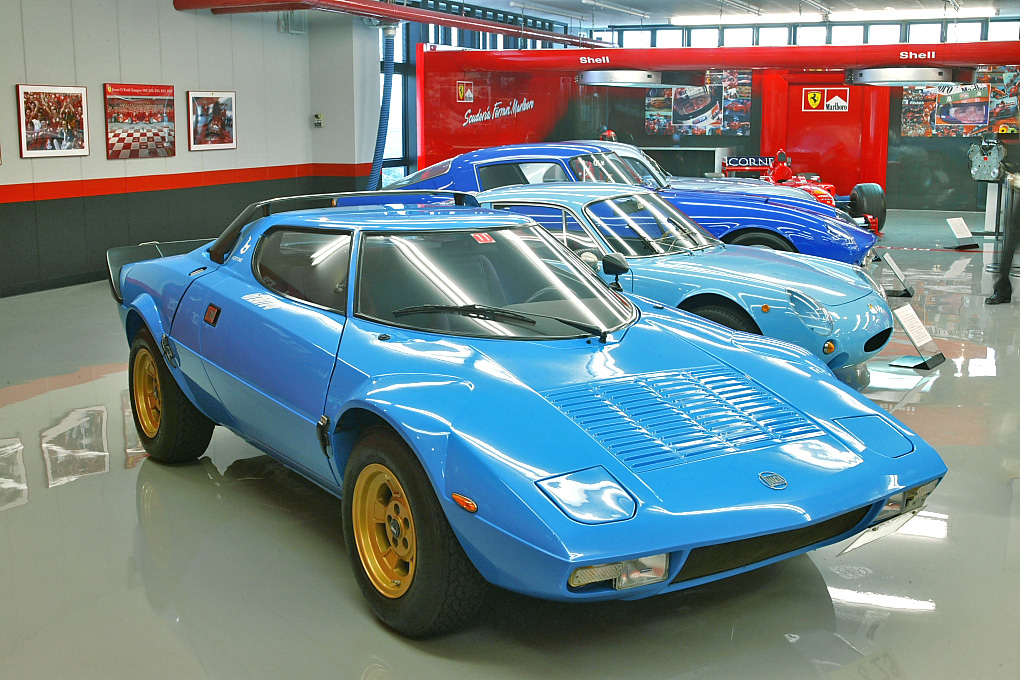
Bertone's Lancia Stratos, 1973.

Data from 2006 indicated that growth in Italian GDP at that time was due to resumption of exports of cars from the Fiat Group. Associated automotive industries also benefited. Such automotive companies include Iveco, Alfa Romeo, Abarth and Lancia, Pininfarina, Bertone and Giugiaro).

General Motors, while breaking a commercial and productive alliance with Fiat, continued research in the testing of diesel engines.

The automotive components industry has expanded and modernised in response to Fiat's success. There is a network of over 350 companies.

The Turin Chamber of Commerce's "From Concept to Car" project, involving 145 companies aimed to promote the excellence of the sector throughout the world.

== Tertiary sector ==
Beginning in the 1980s, tertiary sector industry in Turin has grown in importance.

=== Banking ===
Grattacielo Intesa Sanpaolo, 2015.

Turin hosts the headquarter of the Intesa Sanpaolo banking group, the second largest banking group in Italy measured by market capitalization. 'Fondazione CRT', Reale Mutua Assicurazioni, Alleanza Toro and Fondiaria Sai are also present.

=== Innovative technology ===
In Turin, there are programs, for example, the 'New Turin Economy Project' working to assist collaboration in the private technology sector. Companies and institutions involved include: Polytechnic Institute Mario Boella, Istituto Galileo Ferraris and the Centro ricerche Fiat (CRF, Fiat Research Center), Torino Wireless and the Ministry of University and Research, TILab (formerly CSELT). There is a concentration of such companies at Environment Park and Virtual Reality & Multi Media Park.

In January 2009, Reply S.p.A. acquired the Motorola research centre in Turin in order to initiate research and development programmes governing Machine to Machine (M2M), the Internet of Things and cloud computing: all innovative technologies based on the exchange of information and interaction between networked devices, for automating mission critical processes.

=== Tourism ===
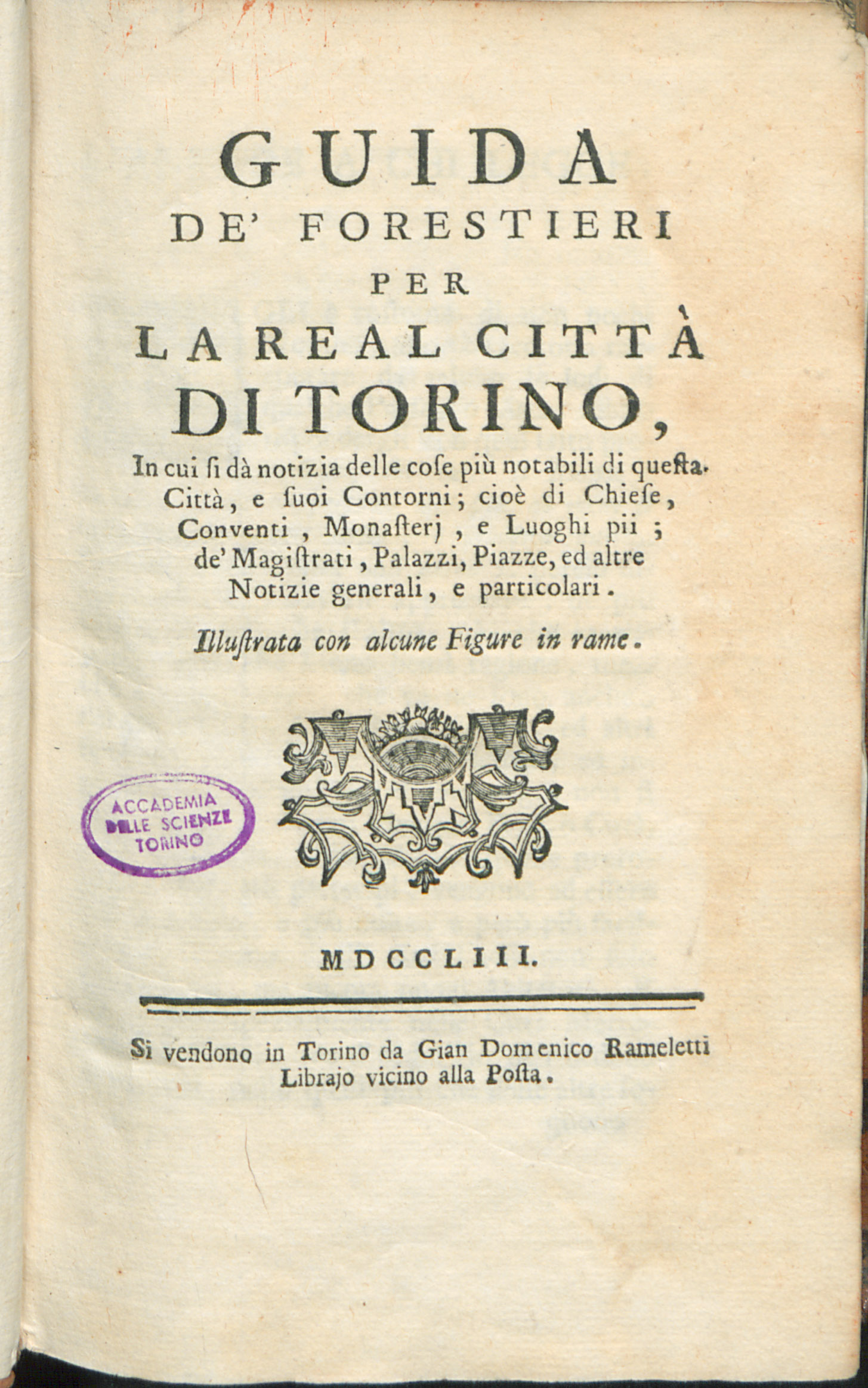
Guida de' forestieri, 1753 ("The original book". Biblioteca Digitale BEIC.)

Already a destination for the Grand Tour, Turin was one of the first Italian cities in history to have a tourist organization; for example, for the three hundred years of the miracle of the SS. Sacramento, the bookseller Giovanni Gaspare Craveri published the Guida de 'forestieri ("Foreigners' guide"). Craveri's guide subdivides the visit of the city in four days and describes in great detail also the surroundings. That of Craveri was followed by other guides, always edited by Turinese people proud of their city; for example in 1781 Onorato Derossi published his Nuova guida per la città di Torino ("New Guide for the city of Turin".)

The 2006 Winter Olympics contributed to Turin's progress after a period of economic doldrums. However, some were not sure of its effect.

"Giorgetto Giugiaro, whose classic industrial designs range from Canon cameras to VW [said], "Turin is a modest city intent on doing things,"... "If the villas we have in La Collinas were in Milan, people would call them the Beverly Hills of Europe. But our problem is that we are not able to talk about what we have." Giugiaro told me about a friend who owns two Rolls-Royces but won't take them out, for fear of showing off. "So he drives around town in an ordinary car and leaves his Rolls in the garage." The city's Versace store had to close because locals wouldn't be caught dead in such ostentatious clothes, and Hermès has to stock plain white paper shopping bags so patrons can carry its understated luxury home without risking any fashion statements along the way."

In 2008, the Turin area was visited by 5.3 million tourists.

== Recent changes ==
The conversion of large urban areas, previously occupied by factories has contributed to recent economic growth.

Large public works such as Passante Ferroviario di Torino and the metro, have also reshaped the city.

Since 2000, Turin, as a place of origin of Italian cinema has housed the National Museum of Cinema at Mole Antonelliana. In 2008, with 532,196 visitors, it reached the thirteenth most visited place among Italian museums. Cineporto, a multipurpose facility dedicated to high-tech film productions and the Lumiq Studios, which produces film, television and advertising.
