= Line SFMA =

Local public transport system in Turin, Italy

Line A

Overview
- Service type: Commuter rail
- Status: Temporarily suspended
- Locale: Metropolitan City of Turin
- First service: 9 December 2012
- Current operator(s): Trenitalia
- Former operator(s): Gruppo Torinese Trasporti

Route
- Termini: Torino DoraDora; Ceres
- Stops: 20

Technical
- Rolling stock: Minuetto
- Track gauge: 1,435 mm (4 ft 8 1/2 in)
- Track owner(s): Turin Metropolitan Railway Service

Line SFMA was part of the Turin Metropolitan Railway Service. It links Turin (at Dora GTT station) via Turin Caselle airport, Venaria Reale and nearby Allianz Stadium. The line was opened on 9 December 2012.

From 25 August 2020, the Torino Dora and Madonna di Campagna stations were decommissioned, truncating the line to Venaria, to allow for the construction of a tunnel connecting Line SFMA to the rest of Turin's railway network. The shuttle bus SF2 would replace SFMA service to those stations

The line was then suspended on 13 June 2023 due to the start of infrastructural and technological upgrading works.

It was then reinaugurated on 20 January 2024, with Trenitalia operating trains on the Germagnano-Cirié section.

During this time, Rete Ferroviaria Italiana conducted upgrades to the loading gauge of the line, causing Line SFMA to be briefly suspended again from 17 to 23 June 2024.

At the end of the school year, on 16 June 2025, service on Line SFMA was stopped again, to allow for further upgrades, including grade separation. The line is scheduled to reopen on 6 September, with full Germagnano-Ceres service returning in 2026.

== Future development ==
A railway tunnel is planned to be built under Corso Grosseto, a major east-west artery in the city, to link the current Turin-Ceres line with Porta Susa station. The duration of the construction is estimated to be three years, but will happen in stages to minimise impact on local residents and business owners. Once completed, the 2.7 km (1.7 mi) long tunnel will include its own underground station, which will replace the current Madonna di Campagna station. Two overpasses on Corso Grosseto will be demolished, and replaced by a signalled intersection. In order to reduce traffic, a 400-metre (1,300 ft) underpass will also be built under Largo Grosseto.

On 14 December 2017 the demolition of the Corso Grosseto overpasses was halted due to the discovery of asbestos within the structure. This could delay the demolition work by two months.
