= Palasport Olimpico and Stadio Comunale area in Turin =

Coordinates: 45.0414°N 7.6521°E

The facilities that were used for the 2006 Winter Olympics are located in various places in and around the city of Turin in the Italian region of Piedmont. The recently completed Torino Palasport Olimpico, which is hosting the ice hockey competitions, is located in the Santa Rita community in southern Turin, which is very close to the Olympic District. The new Palasport Olimpico will be built outside the old Stadio Comunale in the area in front of it. This centrally located area is easily accessible by several modes of public transportation.

An international competition was held to design the new Palasport Olimpico, which is the larger of the two ice hockey venues, to renovate the Stadio Comunale, which hosts the opening and closing ceremonies, and to rebuild the surrounding area. The design competition was won by a group of Tokyo-based architects, led by Plowed Isozaki.

In its conception, the chief concern for architects was to redefine the urban space as this part of the city transitions from the European Athletics Championships in 1934 to a new configuration that would host the 2006 Winter Olympics.
