= Monument to Vittorio Emanuele II (Turin) =

Coordinates: 45.0656°N 7.6709°E

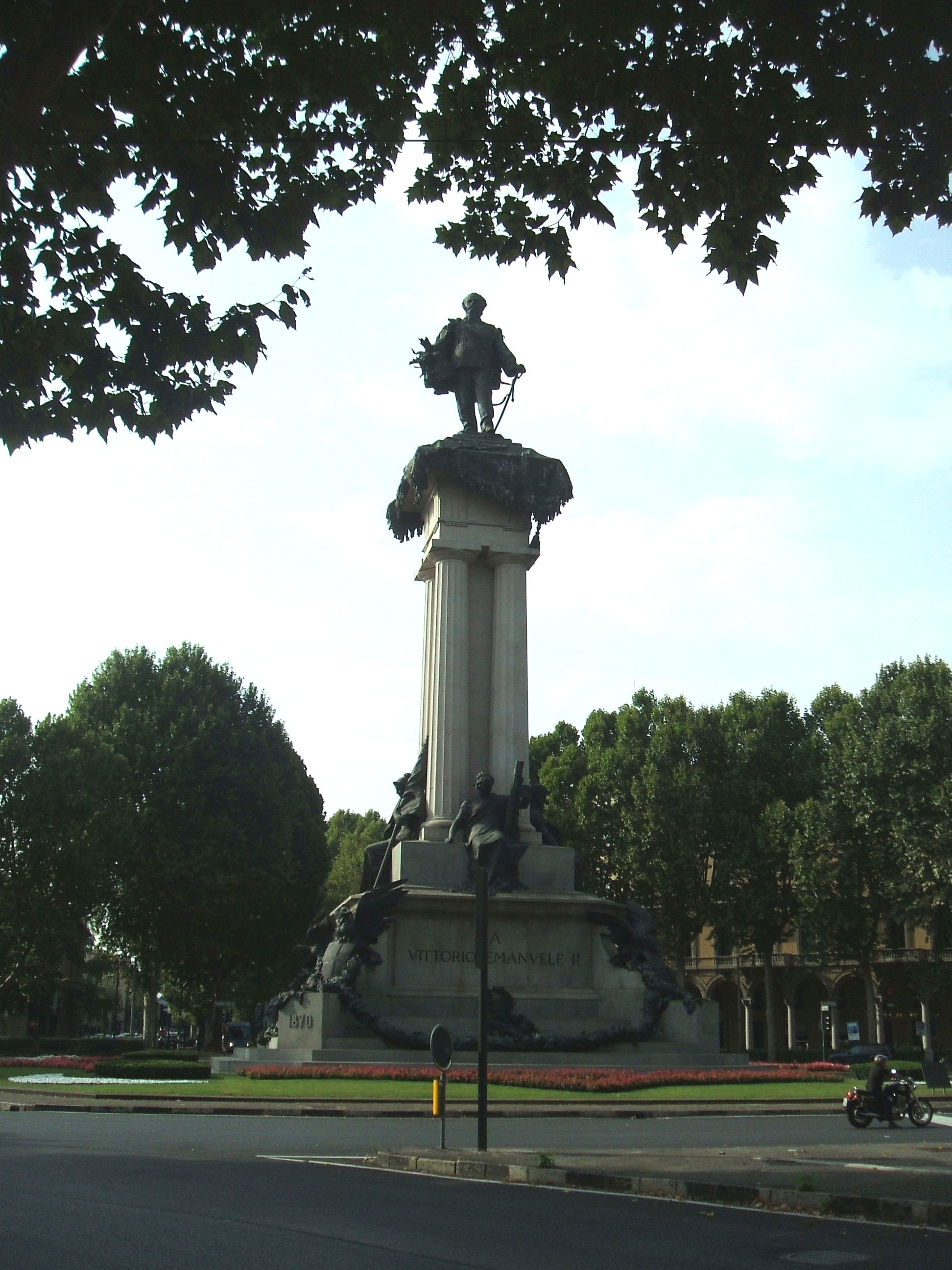
The monument seen from Corso Vittorio

The Monument to Vittorio Emanuele II is a statuary monument atop a set of columns, honoring the first King of Italy, and located in Turin, in the Largo of the same name, at the junction between Corso Vittorio Emanuele II and Corso Galileo Ferraris.

It is dedicated to Vittorio Emanuele II, the first king of Italy. It was wanted by his son, King Umberto I, and paid him at his own expense. The monument, in bronze and granite, is the work of architect Pietro Costa. It was erected between 1882 and 1899, through many contracts with the Turin municipal government.

It was inaugurated on September 9, 1899, twenty years after the death of the king. The festivities were great on the day of the inauguration; Corso Vittorio Emanuele II and Rome were illuminated at party.

The king's statue rises majestically on tall Doric columns. In the sculptural groups at the base of the monument are unity, brotherhood, work and freedom. The monument reaches a considerable height of 39 meters. Its height is popularly called "the King on the Roofs" or "Barba Vigiu".
