= Caffè Fiorio =

Café in Turin, Italy

Coordinates: 45°4′12.77″N 7°40′58.58″E

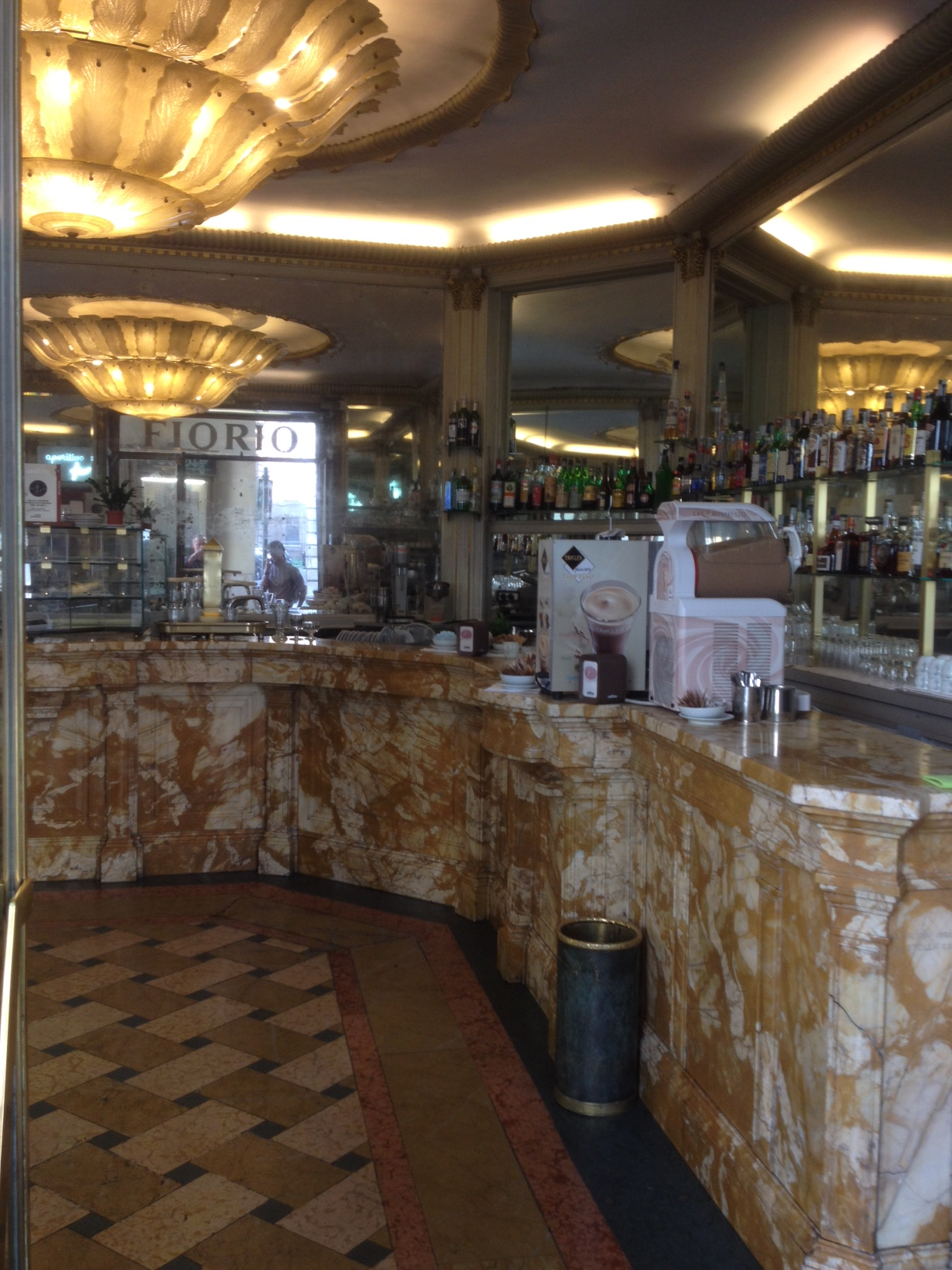
The coffee bar at cafe Fiorio in Turin Italy.

The Caffè Fiorio is a historic café in Turin, northern Italy, located at Via Po 8.

Founded in 1780, Fiorio became a fashionable meeting place for the artistic, intellectual and political classes of the capital of the Kingdom of Sardinia. Frequented by Urbano Rattazzi, Massimo D'Azeglio, Giovanni Prati, Camillo Benso Conte di Cavour (who founded the Whist Club here), Giacinto Provana di Collegno, Cesare Balbo and Friedrich Nietzsche, it became known as "the café of the Machiavellis and of the pigtails."
