= Madonna di Campagna =

Quarter of Turin, Piedmont, Italy

Coordinates: 45°6′N 7°40′E

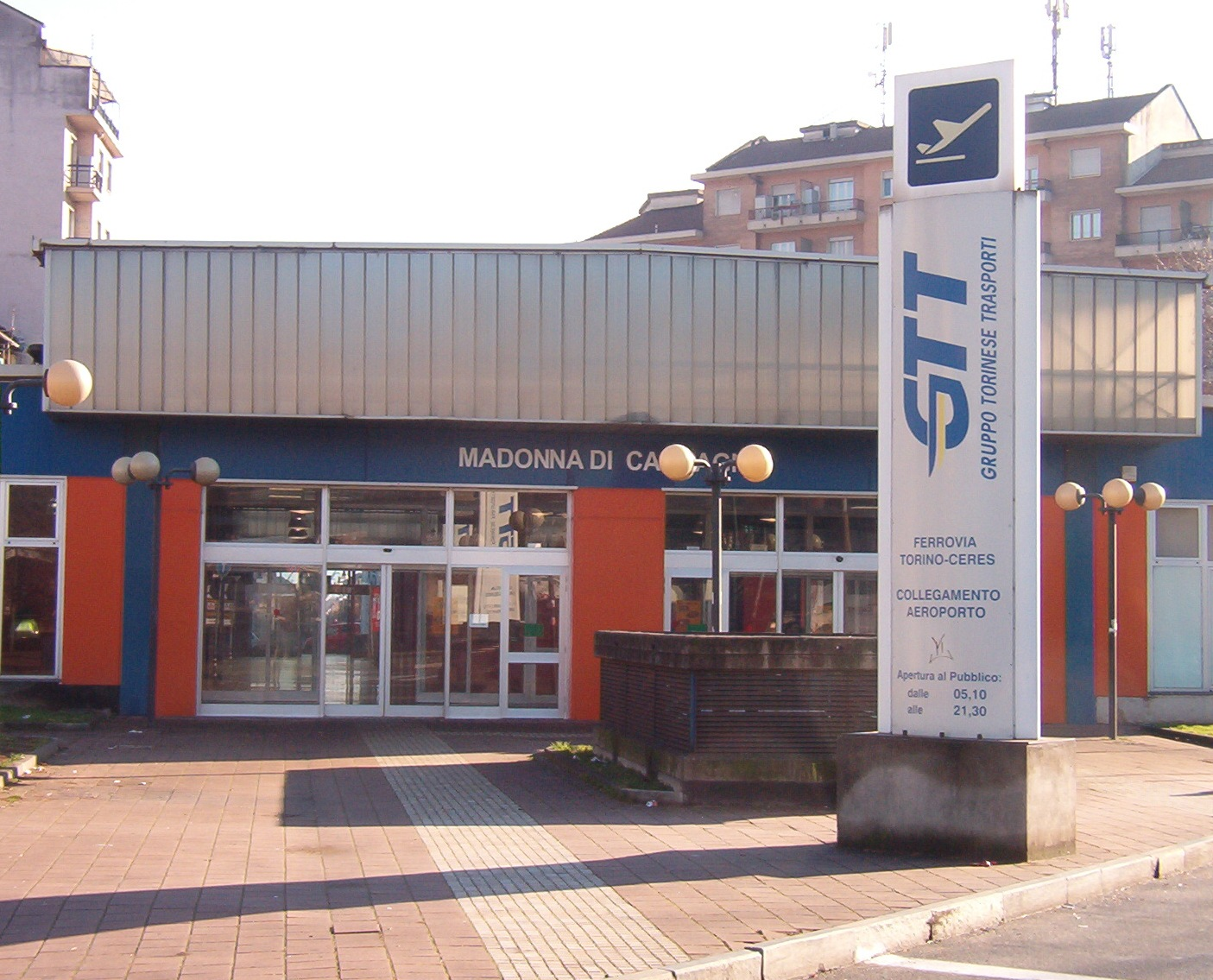
Madonna di Campagna subway station on the Torino-Aeroporto-Ceres line.

Madonna di Campagna is a quarter of Turin, Piedmont, Italy.

Madonna di Campagna station lies within the quarter on Turin's Airport Line.
