= Royal Armoury of Turin =

Museum in Turin, Italy

Coordinates: 45.0709°N 7.6868°E

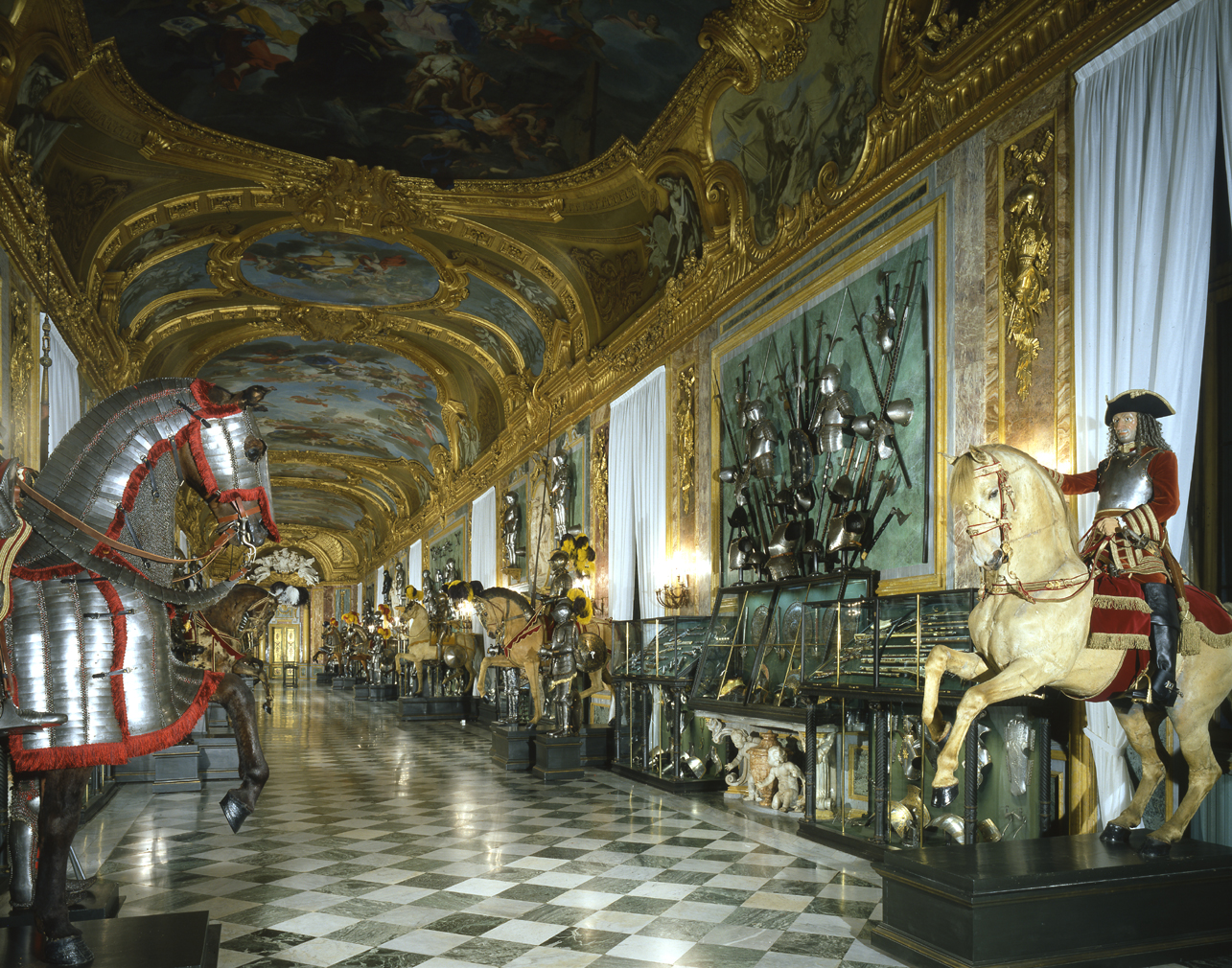
Galleria Beaumont

The Royal Armoury of Turin (Italian: Armeria Reale) is one of the world's most important collections of arms and armour, formed in Turin by the Savoy family. The museum is now part of the Musei Reali di Torino, the royal site that has unified the Royal Palace, the Sabauda Gallery, the Archaeological Museum, the Royal Library and the Armoury. The whole site has been included on the UNESCO World Heritage list since 1997.

== History ==
The Royal Armoury was founded by Charles Albert, king of Sardinia, and opened to the public in 1837. Since then it has been housed in the Galleria Beaumont, built on the site of a previous gallery connecting the Royal Palace to Palazzo Madama. Designed by Filippo Juvarra in 1733, it was decorated by the court painter Claudio Francesco Beaumont (hence its name) in 1738–1743, whose oil paintings on the ceiling depict Stories of Aeneas. The gallery was completed after 1762 by Benedetto Alfieri, who also designed the nearby stairway as an access to the State offices (Segreterie di Stato). Until 1832, several large paintings from the royal collections were displayed on the walls of this gallery. The paintings were then moved to Palazzo Madama, the first seat of the public collection called Reale Galleria (now Sabauda Gallery). King Charles Albert decided to place his collection of arms and armour inside this gallery; most of them came from Turin’s and Genoa’s arsenals, as well as from the museums housed since the 18th century in the Palazzo dell’Università. The royal collection included prehistoric and medieval objects, weapons and armour used by the dukes (later kings) of Savoy, but also many prestigious diplomatic gifts. Charles Albert enriched such collection through the acquisition of single pieces on the market (mainly in Paris) and of whole private collections, such as the one formed by the set designer Alessandro Sanquirico in Milan (1833) and the Martinengo della Fabbrica collection from Brescia (1839). In 1836, the king asked Pelagio Palagi to redesign an adjacent room in order to make it the seat of the Medagliere, i.e. a large collection of medals, coins and seals. The room's Greek-style furniture was specifically meant to preserve and display this collection, as well as antiques and other precious objects belonging to the royal family. The Medagliere was closely connected with the Royal Library still housed on the ground floor. Palagi also designed the so-called Rotonda at the other end of the Galleria Beaumont, on the site of a former theatre (later ballroom) once connected to Palazzo Madama through a further gallery which was demolished in 1809. The Rotonda became an extension of the original Armoury: arms, flags and other objects connected with the military history of the kingdom of Sardinia after the 18th century were then displayed in showcases in this room. The collection includes weapons formerly owned by Napoleon and by the kings of Italy, since the Savoy family gained that title after the unification of the country in 1861. European and American swords, guns and rifles are now displayed alongside oriental arms and armour acquired by or donated to the kings.

== Collections ==
Among the objects belonging to the collection are the sword of San Maurizio, one of the most important relics owned by the Savoy family, made in the 13th century and still preserved with its 15th-century impressed, gilded and painted leather case; a 14th-century enamel horse bit from Naples; a 16th-century pistol which belonged to the emperor Charles V; precious armour such as count Girolamo Martinengo's corsaletto (breastplate), dating from c. 1540, Henry II’s parade shield (c. 1556 – 1559), and the war and jousting armour made by the Milanese armourer Pompeo della Cesa around 1590; extremely rich arms such as the hunting musket decorated in ivory by the German engraver Adam Sadeler around 1600; the sword used by Napoleon during his campaign in Egypt; guns and rifles owned by Charles Albert of Sardinia and by the kings of Italy Victor Emmanuel II and Umberto I; a Russian model Smith & Wesson revolver dating from the late 19th century.

== See also ==
- Musée de l'Armée
- Royal Armouries
- Royal Armoury of Madrid
