= San Benigno Canavese railway station =

Railway station in Piedmont, Italy

S.Benigno Canavese

General information
- Location: Strada Provinciale di San Giusto, San Benigno Canavese; San Benigno Canavese, Turin, Piedmont; Italy
- Coordinates: 45.2186°N 7.7822°E
- Owner: Rete Ferroviaria Italiana
- Operator: Rete Ferroviaria Italiana
- Line: Settimo – Pont Canavese
- Platforms: 2
- Train operators: Trenitalia
- Connections: Local buses
Location
- Location within Northern Italy

San Benigno Canavese railway station (Italian: Stazione di San Benigno Canavese) serves the town and comune of San Benigno Canavese, in the Piedmont region, northwestern Italy.

Since 2012 it serves line SFM1, part of the Turin metropolitan railway service.

== Services ==
Preceding station	Turin SFM	Following station
Bosconero towards Pont Canavese	SFM1	Volpiano towards Chieri
