= Rivarolo Canavese railway station =

Railway station in Italy

Rivarolo Canavese
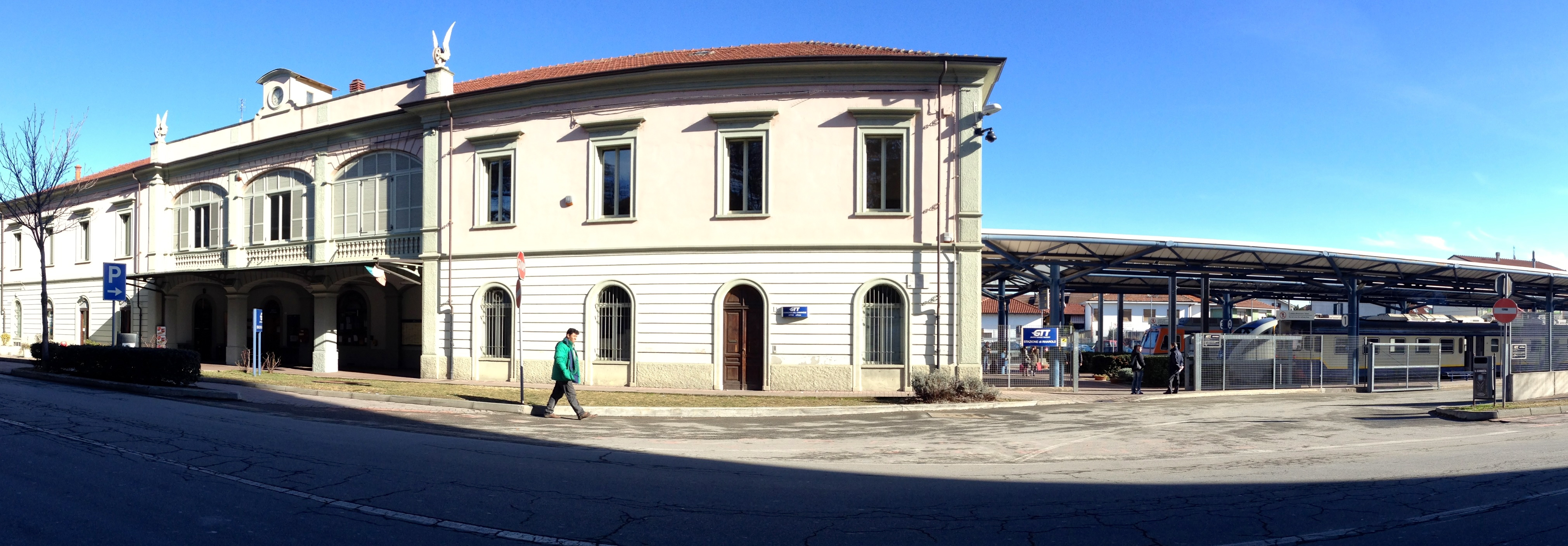

General information
- Location: Corso Torino, Rivarolo Canavese; Rivarolo Canavese, Turin, Piedmont; Italy
- Coordinates: 45.3284°N 7.7262°E
- Owner: Rete Ferroviaria Italiana
- Operator: GTT
- Line: Settimo – Pont Canavese
- Platforms: 4
- Train operators: GTT
- Connections: Local buses
Location
- Location within Northern Italy

Rivarolo Canavese railway station (Italian: Stazione di Rivarolo Canavese) serves the town and comune of Rivarolo Canavese, in the Piedmont region, northwestern Italy.

Since 2012 it serves line SFM1, part of the Turin metropolitan railway service.

== Services ==
Preceding station	Turin SFM	Following station
Favria towards Pont Canavese	SFM1	Feletto towards Chieri
