= Bosconero railway station =

Railway station in Bosconero, Italy

Bosconero
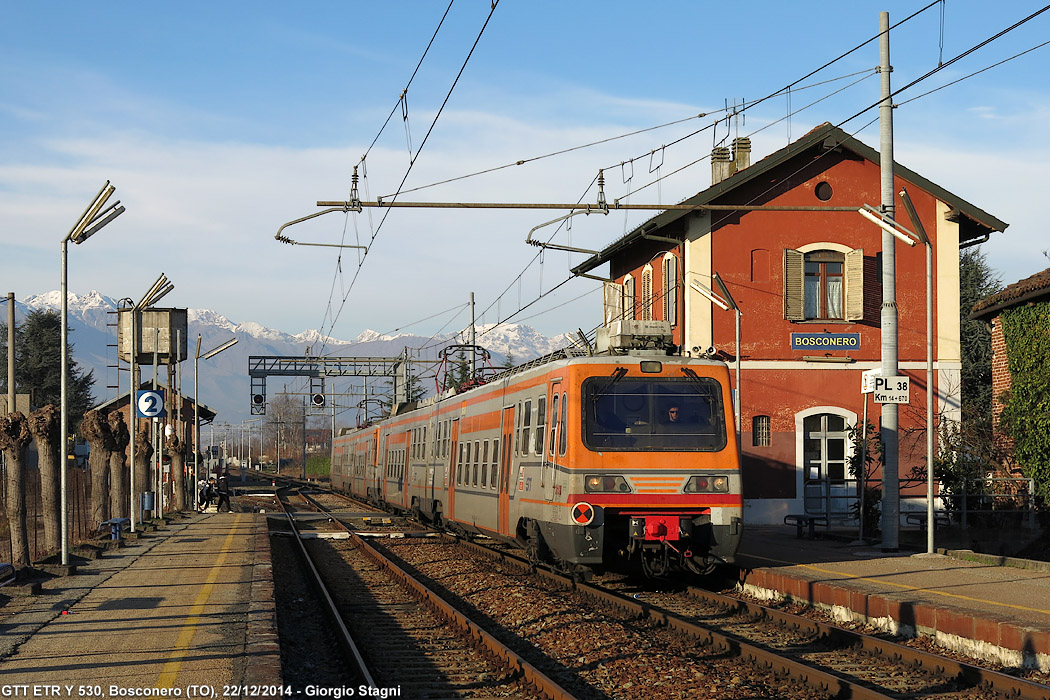

General information
- Location: Via Torino, Bosconero; Bosconero, Turin, Piedmont; Italy
- Coordinates: 45.2675°N 7.7619°E
- Owner: Rete Ferroviaria Italiana
- Operator: Rete Ferroviaria Italiana
- Line: Settimo – Pont Canavese
- Platforms: 2
- Train operators: Trenitalia
- Connections: Local buses
Location
- Location within Northern Italy

Bosconero railway station (Italian: Stazione di Bosconero) serves the town and comune of Bosconero, in the Piedmont region, northwestern Italy.

Since 2012 it serves line SFM1, part of the Turin metropolitan railway service.

== Services ==
Preceding station	Turin SFM	Following station
Feletto towards Pont Canavese	SFM1	San Benigno towards Chieri
