= Feletto railway station =

Railway station in Feletto, Italy

Feletto

General information
- Location: Via Avenati, Feletto; Feletto, Turin, Piedmont; Italy
- Coordinates: 45.3037°N 7.7438°E
- Owner: Rete Ferroviaria Italiana
- Operator: Rete Ferroviaria Italiana
- Line: Settimo – Pont Canavese
- Platforms: 2
- Train operators: Trenitalia
- Connections: Local buses
Location
- Location within Northern Italy

Feletto railway station (Italian: Stazione di Feletto) serves the town and comune of Feletto, in the Piedmont region, northwestern Italy.

Since 2012 it serves line SFM1, part of the Turin metropolitan railway service.

== Services ==
Preceding station	Turin SFM	Following station
Rivarolo Canavese towards Pont Canavese	SFM1	Bosconero towards Chieri
