= Foglizzo =

- Comune
- Comune di Foglizzo
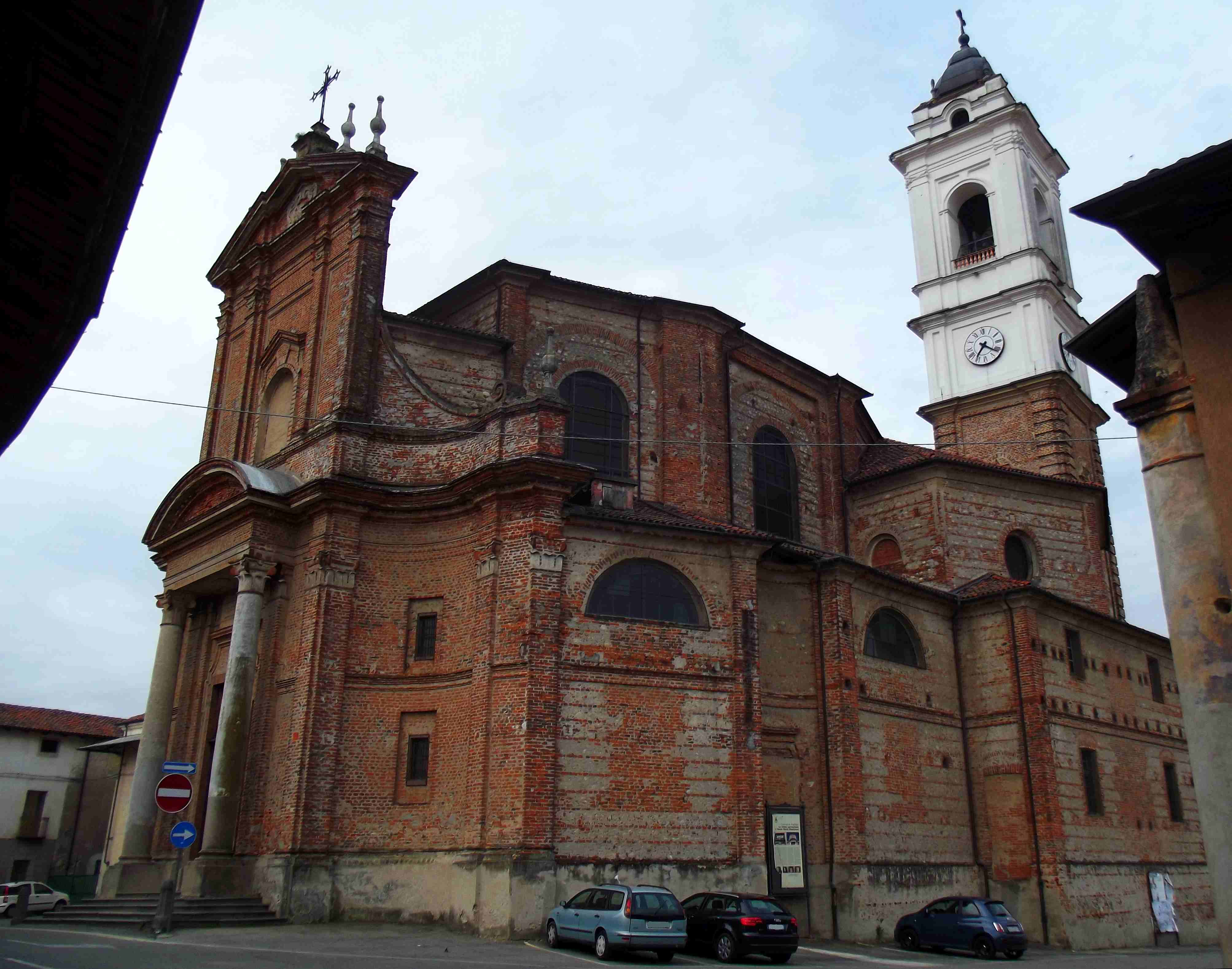
- Church of Santa Maria Maddalena.

- Coat of arms

- Location within Italy Location within Piedmont
- Coordinates: 45°16′N 7°49′E
- Country: Italy
- Region: Piedmont
- Metropolitan city: Turin (TO)

Government
  - Mayor: Fulvio Gallenca

Area
  - Total: 15.64 km^{2} (6.04 sq mi)
- Elevation: 247 m (810 ft)

Population (30 November 2017)
  - Total: 2,337
  - Density: 149.4/km^{2} (387.0/sq mi)
- Demonym: Foglizzesi
- Time zone: UTC+1 (CET)
  - Summer (DST): UTC+2 (CEST)
- Postal code: 10090
- Dialing code: 011
- Website: Official website

Foglizzo is a comune (municipality) in the Metropolitan City of Turin in the Italian region Piedmont, located about 25 kilometres (16 mi) northeast of Turin. It is part of the Canavese historical region.

Foglizzo borders the following municipalities: San Giorgio Canavese, San Giusto Canavese, Caluso, Bosconero, San Benigno Canavese, and Montanaro. It is mentioned for the first time in an 882 document, when it was owned by the bishop of Vercelli. Later it was a possessions of the counts of Biandrate and, from 1631, of the Dukes of Savoy. Foglizzo Castle, perhaps of Roman origins, is located in the town, and was turned into a noble residence in the 17th and 18th centuries.

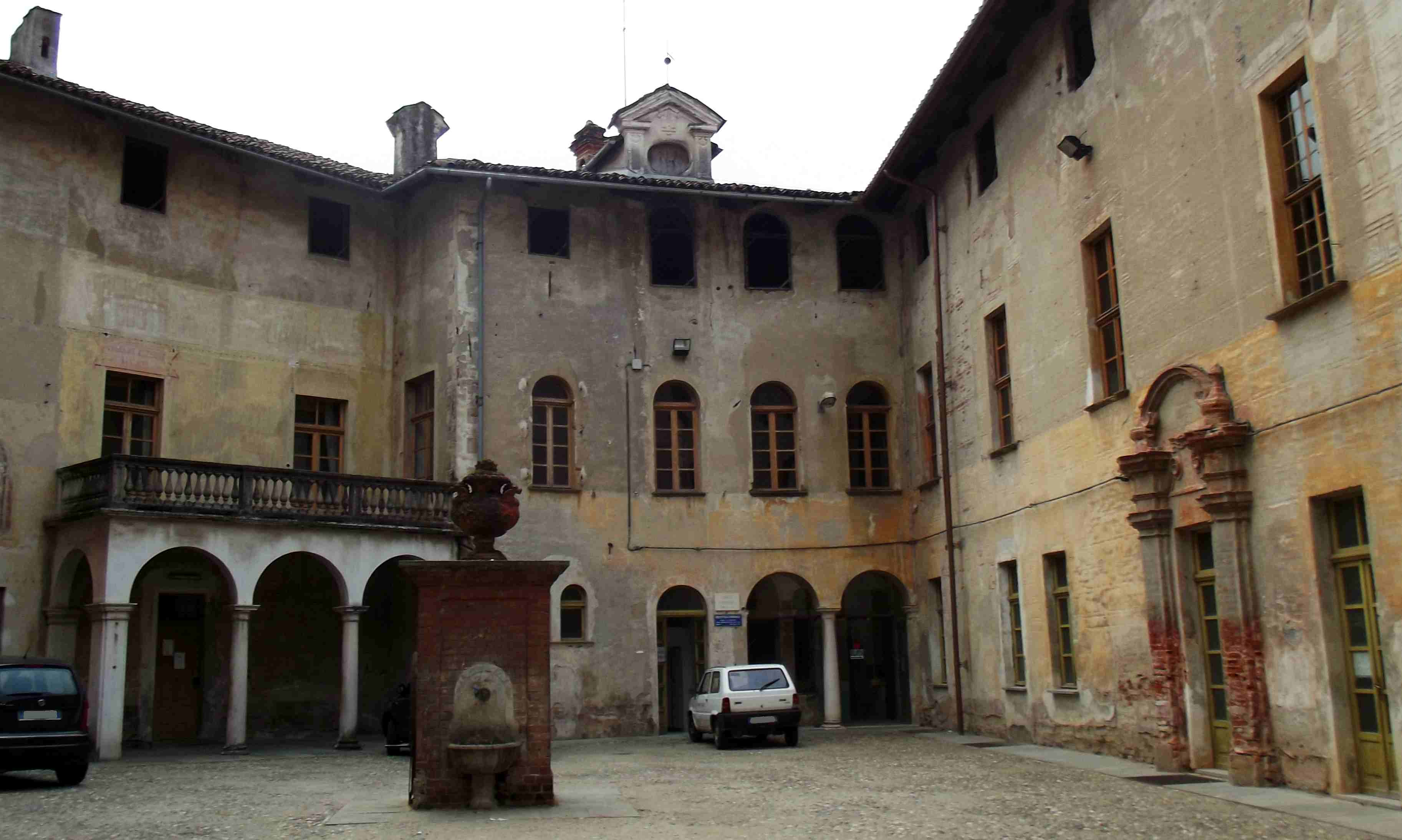
Castle's courtyard
