= Volpiano railway station =

Railway station in Volpiano, Italy

Volpiano
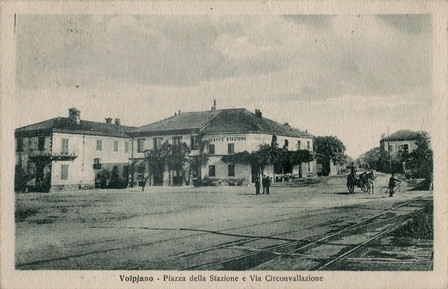

General information
- Location: Piazza Mazzini, Volpiano; Volpiano, Turin, Piedmont; Italy
- Coordinates: 45.2004°N 7.7797°E
- Owner: Rete Ferroviaria Italiana
- Operator: Rete Ferroviaria Italiana
- Line: Settimo – Pont Canavese
- Platforms: 2
- Train operators: Trenitalia
- Connections: Local buses

History
- Opened: 1866; 154 years ago.
Location
- Location within Northern Italy

Volpiano railway station (Italian: Stazione di Volpiano) serves the town and comune of Volpiano, in the Piedmont region, northwestern Italy.

Since 2012 it serves line SFM1, part of the Turin metropolitan railway service.

== Services ==
| Preceding station | Turin SFM | Following station |
|---|---|---|
| Terminus | SFM1 | Settimo Torinese towards Chieri |
