= Brandizzo =

- Comune
- Comune di Brandizzo
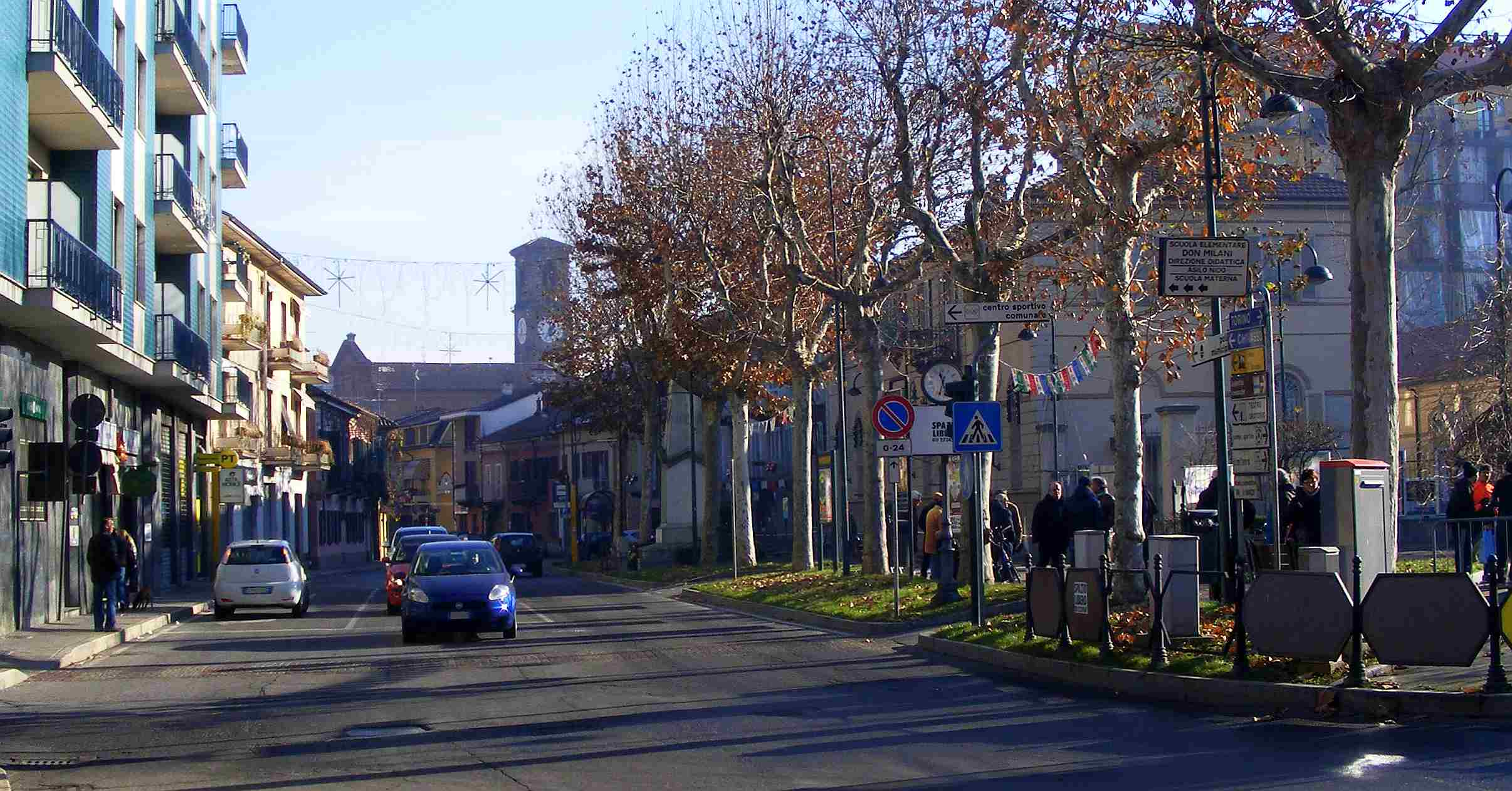

- Coat of arms

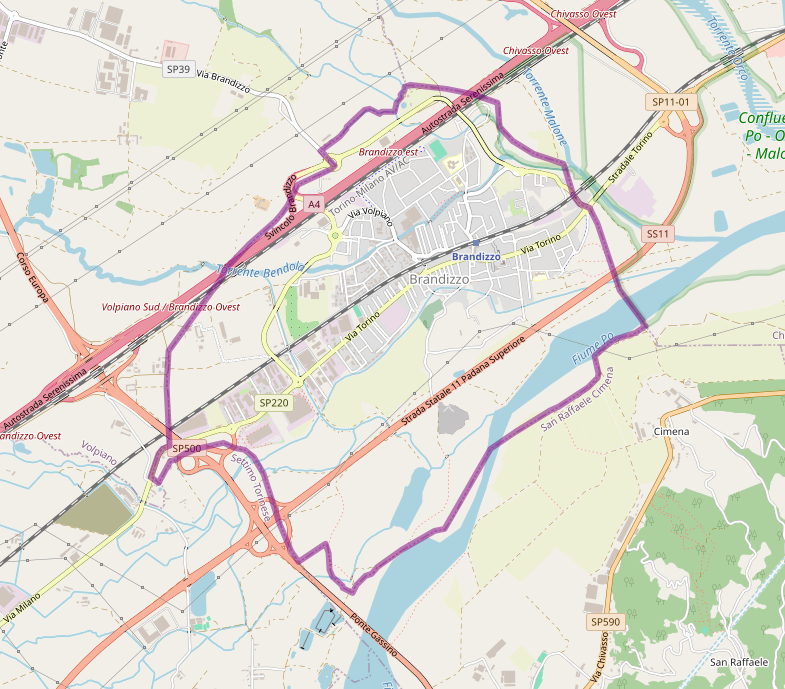

- Location within Italy Location within Piedmont
- Coordinates: 45°11′N 7°50′E
- Country: Italy
- Region: Piedmont
- Metropolitan city: Turin (TO)

Government
  - Mayor: Paolo Bodoni

Area
  - Total: 6.29 km^{2} (2.43 sq mi)
- Elevation: 187 m (614 ft)

Population (31-12-2021)
  - Total: 9,100
  - Density: 1,400/km^{2} (3,700/sq mi)
- Demonym: Brandizzese(i)
- Time zone: UTC+1 (CET)
  - Summer (DST): UTC+2 (CEST)
- Postal code: 10032
- Dialing code: 011
- Website: Official website

Brandizzo (Piedmontese: Brandiss) is a comune (municipality) in the Metropolitan City of Turin in the Italian region of Piedmont, located about 15 kilometres (9 mi) northeast of Turin.

Brandizzo borders the following municipalities: Chivasso, Volpiano, Settimo Torinese, and San Raffaele Cimena.

Brandizzo railway station connects the town to Turin city centre.
