= San Giorgio Canavese Castle =

Castle in San Giorgio Canavese, Piedmont, Italy

- Castello di San Giorgio Canavese
- San Giorgio Canavese, Piedmont, Italy
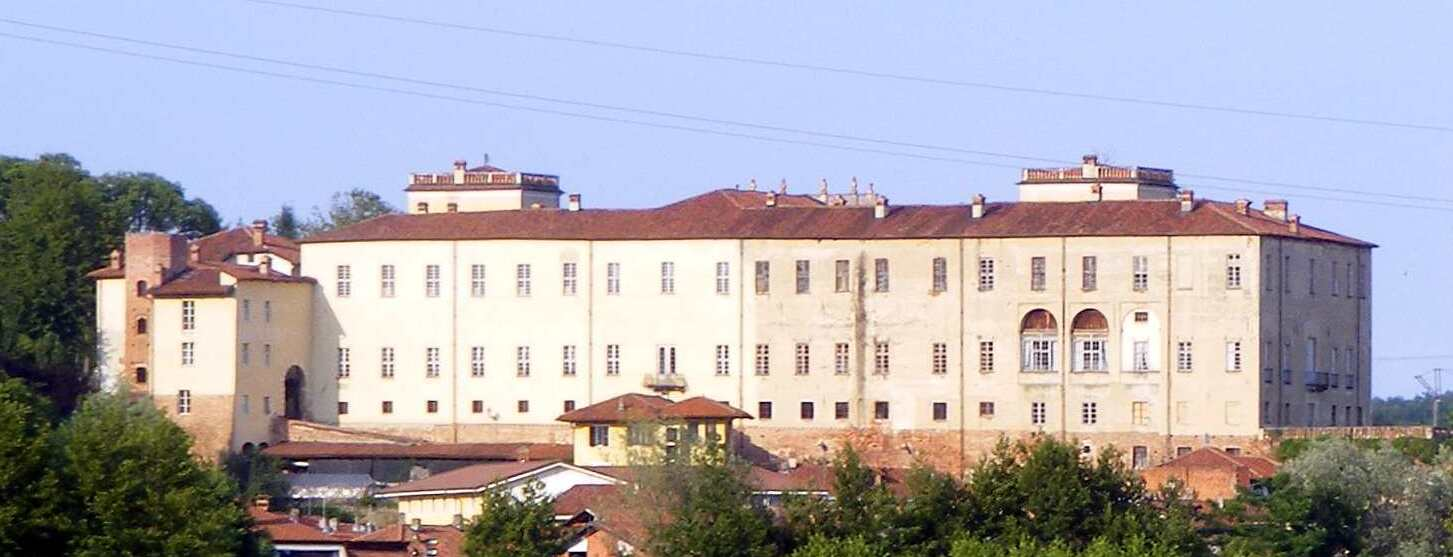
- San Giorgio Canavese Castle in 2013

Site information
- Type: Castle

Location
- Coordinates: 45°20′14.11″N 7°47′52.63″E

San Giorgio Canavese Castle (Italian: Castello di San Giorgio Canavese) is a castle located in San Giorgio Canavese, Piedmont, Italy.

== History ==
The castle dates back at least to the 12th century and belonged for much of its history to the Biandrate family. Over time, multiple constructions were built on the hill where it stands, forming a complex of castles rather than a single fortress.

The castle is made up by two distinct sections: an older part from the 12th-14th centuries, built on the ruins of an even earlier castle destroyed by the militias of the Lombard League in 1168 and of which only a few traces remain, and a more recent section from the 15th-16th centuries.

In the 17th and early 18th century, significant modifications, especially sponsored by Guido Aldobrandini of the Foglizzo branch of the Biandrate family, gave the castle a unified structure in its "new" part, with the removal of all its towers. The western side was aligned and made straight, while the eastern side was enhanced with a grand façade.

Meanwhile, the "old" section of the castle underwent modifications by Baldassarre Ferdinando of the Lusigliè branch of the Biandrate family. Until the late 17th century, the structure was in good condition, consisting of two buildings connected by a gallery that separated a noble courtyard from a rustic one. Between the late 17th and early 18th centuries, the castle was further unified: its western building was demolished and replaced by a new construction, while the eastern building was expanded and modified, incorporating the former northern rustic courtyard. The last remaining tower was reduced in height to align with Guido Aldobrandino’s new construction, resulting in two contiguous but distinct buildings. However, the entire "old" section of the castle was demolished at the beginning of the 19th century, and replaced by an English garden.
