= Koseč =

- Location in Slovenia
- Coordinates: 46°15′7.33″N 13°37′26.52″E
- Country: Slovenia
- Traditional region: Slovenian Littoral
- Statistical region: Gorizia
- Municipality: Kobarid

Area
  - Total: 5.65 km^{2} (2.18 sq mi)
- Elevation: 629.1 m (2,064 ft)

Population (2002)
  - Total: 68

Koseč (pronounced [kɔˈsɛtʃ]; Italian: Cossis) is a small settlement above Drežnica in the Municipality of Kobarid in the Littoral region of Slovenia.

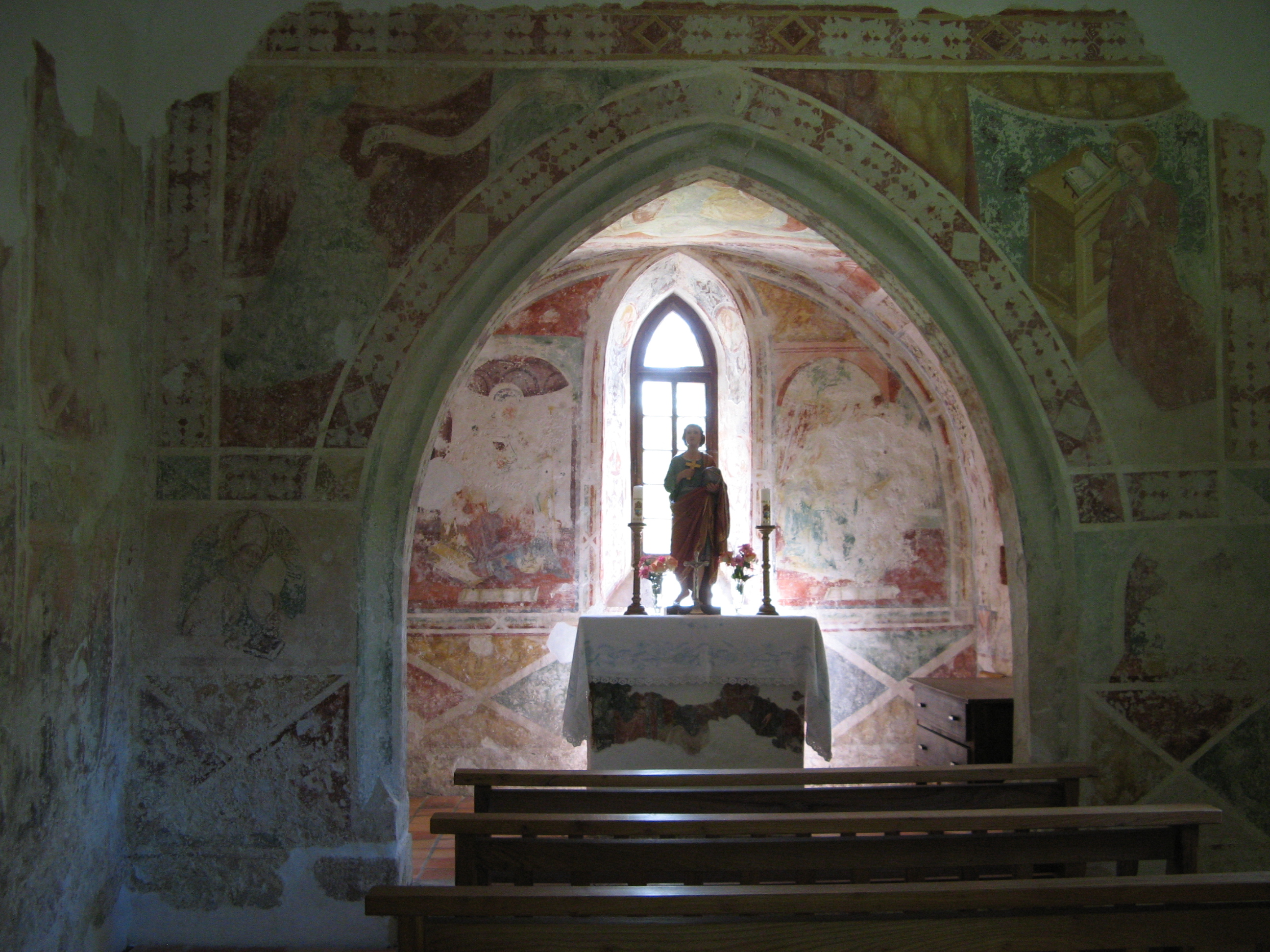
Interior of Saint Justus' Church

A small church in the settlement dedicated to Saint Justus dates to the second half of the 14th century, making it one of the oldest surviving churches in the Soča area. It is built of travertine and its interior is covered in frescos from the late 15th century.
