= Bosconero =

- Comune
- Comune di Bosconero
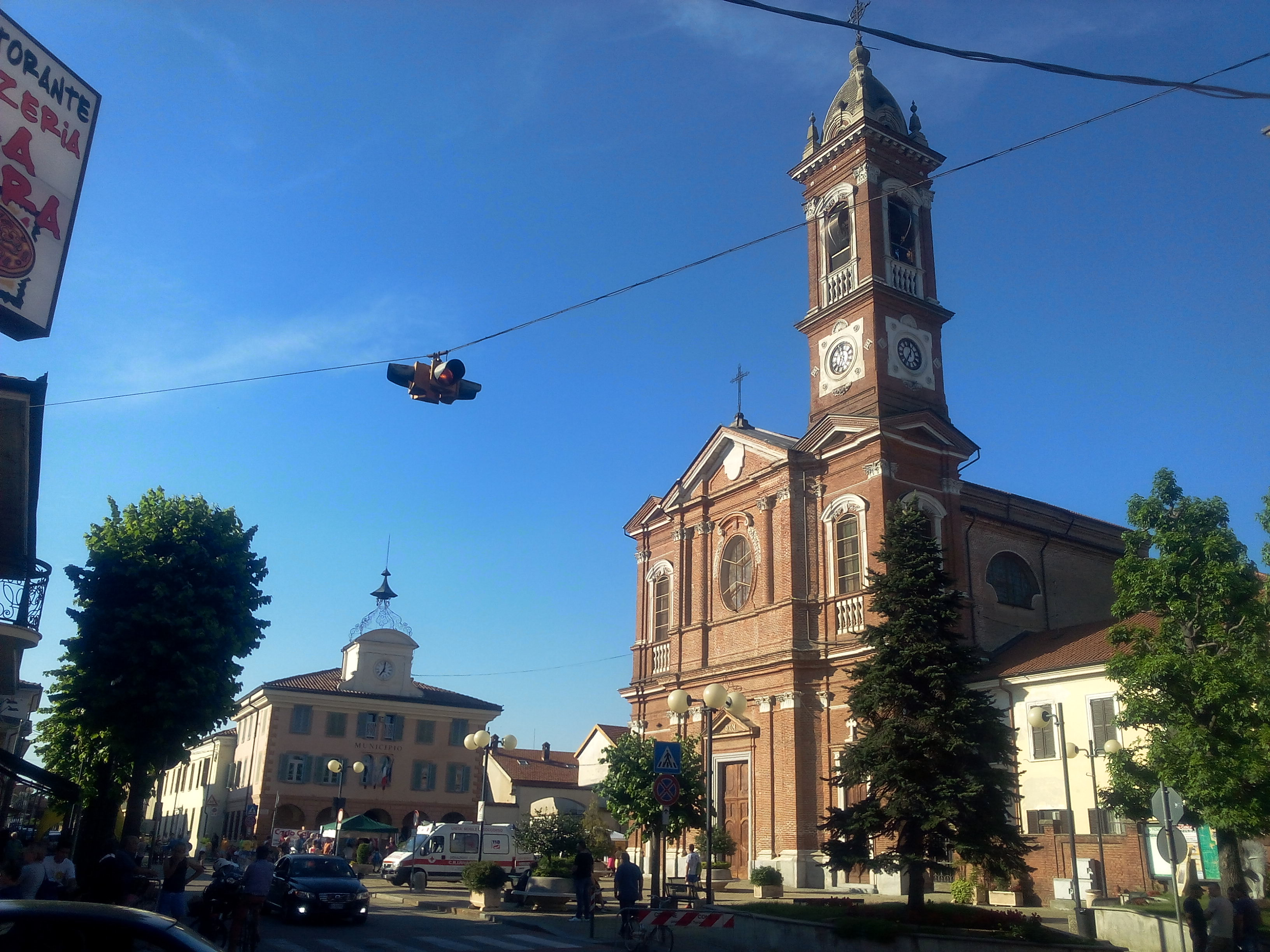

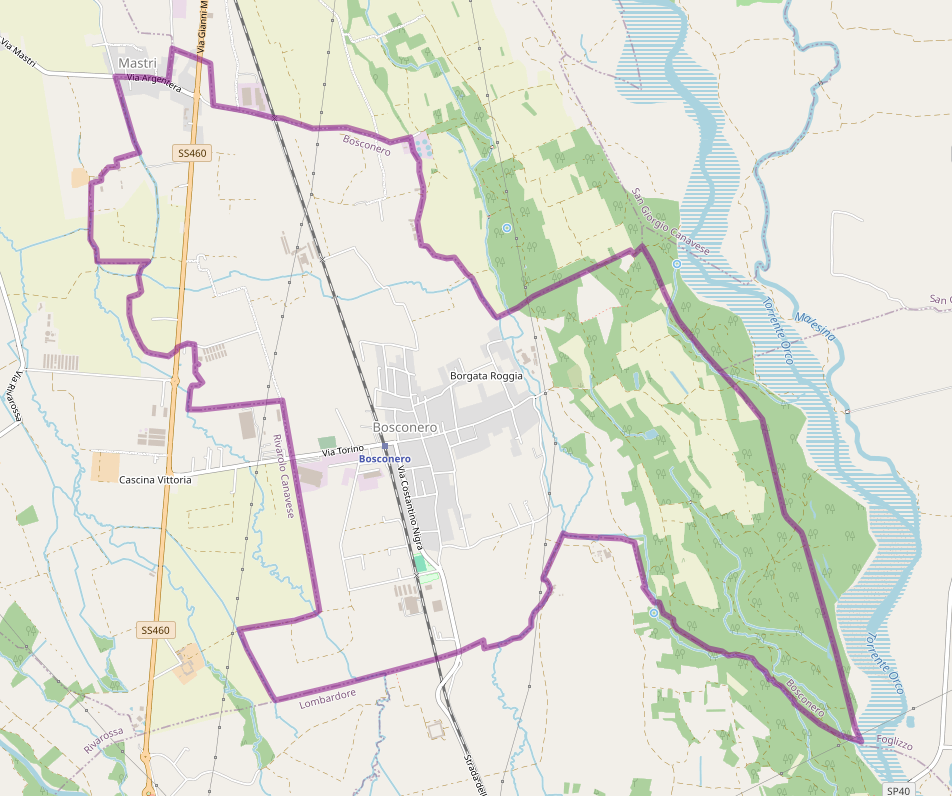

- Location within Italy Location within Piedmont
- Coordinates: 45°16′05″N 7°45′54″E
- Country: Italy
- Region: Piedmont
- Metropolitan city: Turin (TO)
- Frazioni: Mastri

Government
  - Mayor: Paola Forneris

Area
  - Total: 10.92 km^{2} (4.22 sq mi)
- Elevation: 239 m (784 ft)

Population (30 November 2017)
  - Total: 3,147
  - Density: 288.2/km^{2} (746.4/sq mi)
- Demonym: Bosconeresi
- Time zone: UTC+1 (CET)
  - Summer (DST): UTC+2 (CEST)
- Postal code: 10080
- Dialing code: 011
- Website: Official website

Bosconero Italian pronunciation: [boskoˈneːro] is a comune (municipality) in the Metropolitan City of Turin in the Italian region Piedmont, located about 25 kilometres (16 mi) north of Turin.

Bosconero borders the following municipalities: Rivarolo Canavese, San Giusto Canavese, Feletto, Foglizzo, San Benigno Canavese, and Lombardore.
