= Settimo Torinese railway station =

Railway station in Italy

Settimo
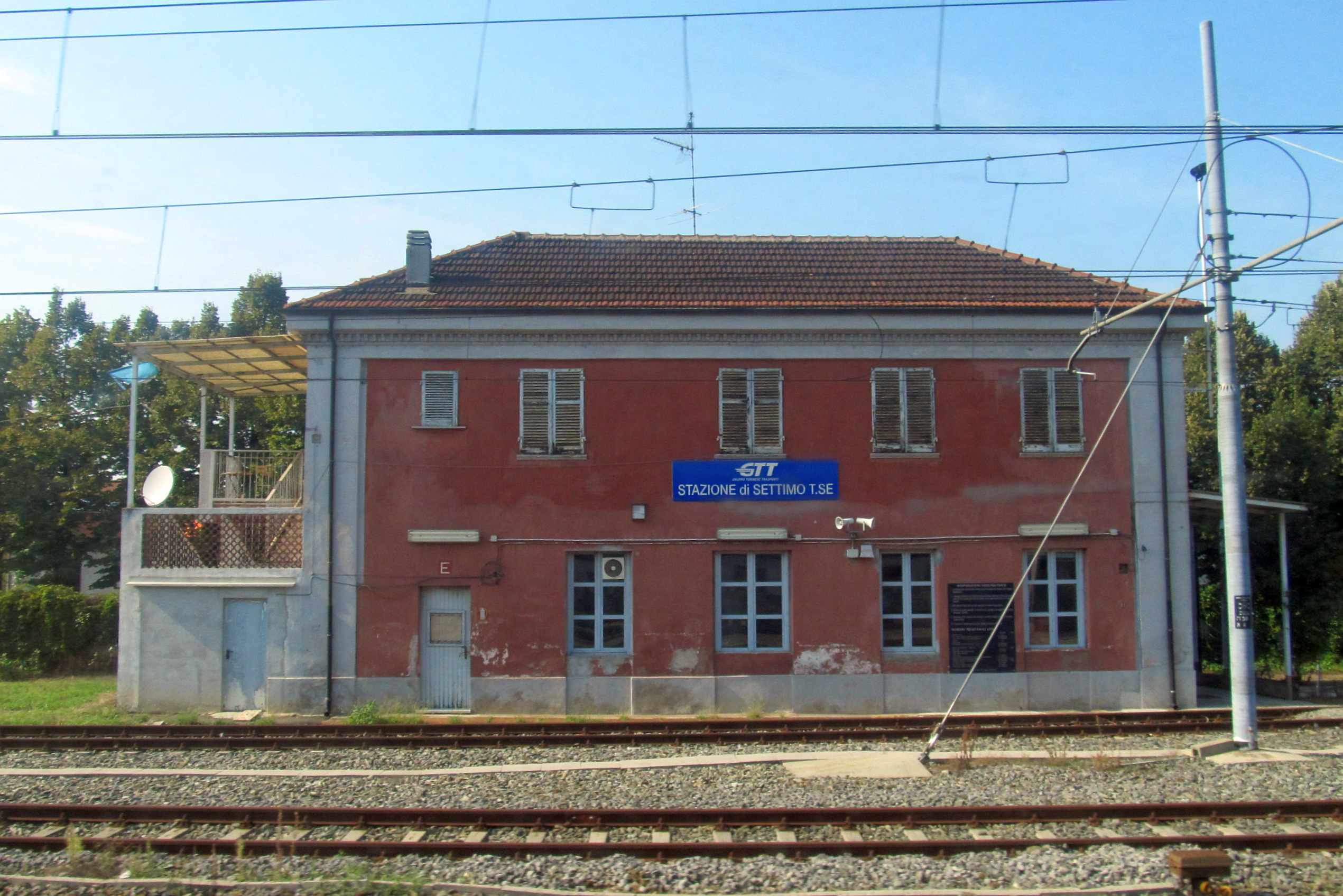

General information
- Location: Piazza Luigi Pagliero 2, Settimo Torinese; Settimo Torinese, Metropolitan City of Turin, Piedmont; Italy
- Coordinates: 45°08′17″N 07°45′54″E
- Owner: Rete Ferroviaria Italiana
- Operator: Rete Ferroviaria Italiana
- Lines: Turin – Milan; Settimo – Pont Canavese
- Distance: 17 km (11 mi) from Torino Porta Nuova
- Platforms: 6
- Train operators: Trenitalia
- Connections: Local buses

Other information
- Classification: Silver

History
- Opened: 1856
Location
- Location within Piedmont Location within Northern Italy Location within Italy

Settimo railway station (Italian: Stazione di Settimo) serves the town and comune of Settimo Torinese, in the Piedmont region, northwestern Italy. Opened in 1856, the station is a through station of the Turin-Milan railway and is a terminal of the Settimo-Pont Canavese railway.

Since 2012 it serves lines SFM1 and SFM2, part of the Turin metropolitan railway service.

== Services ==
Preceding station	Turin SFM	Following station
Volpiano towards Pont Canavese	SFM1	Torino Stura towards Chieri
Brandizzo towards Chivasso	SFM2	Torino Stura towards Pinerolo
