= Cortereggio =

The hamlet of Cortereggio (Cortress in Piedmontese) is located within the municipality of San Giorgio Canavese, in the province of Turin, and currently has 229 inhabitants. The settlement is situated south of the municipal seat, about 5 kilometres away, at an altitude of 245 meters above sea level, in an entirely flat area next to the Orco Stream. The main roads leading to Cortereggio connect it to the nearby towns of Lusigliè and San Giusto Canavese. Archival documentation and the toponym itself (Curtis Regia) confirm the early medieval origin of the settlement of Cortereggio.

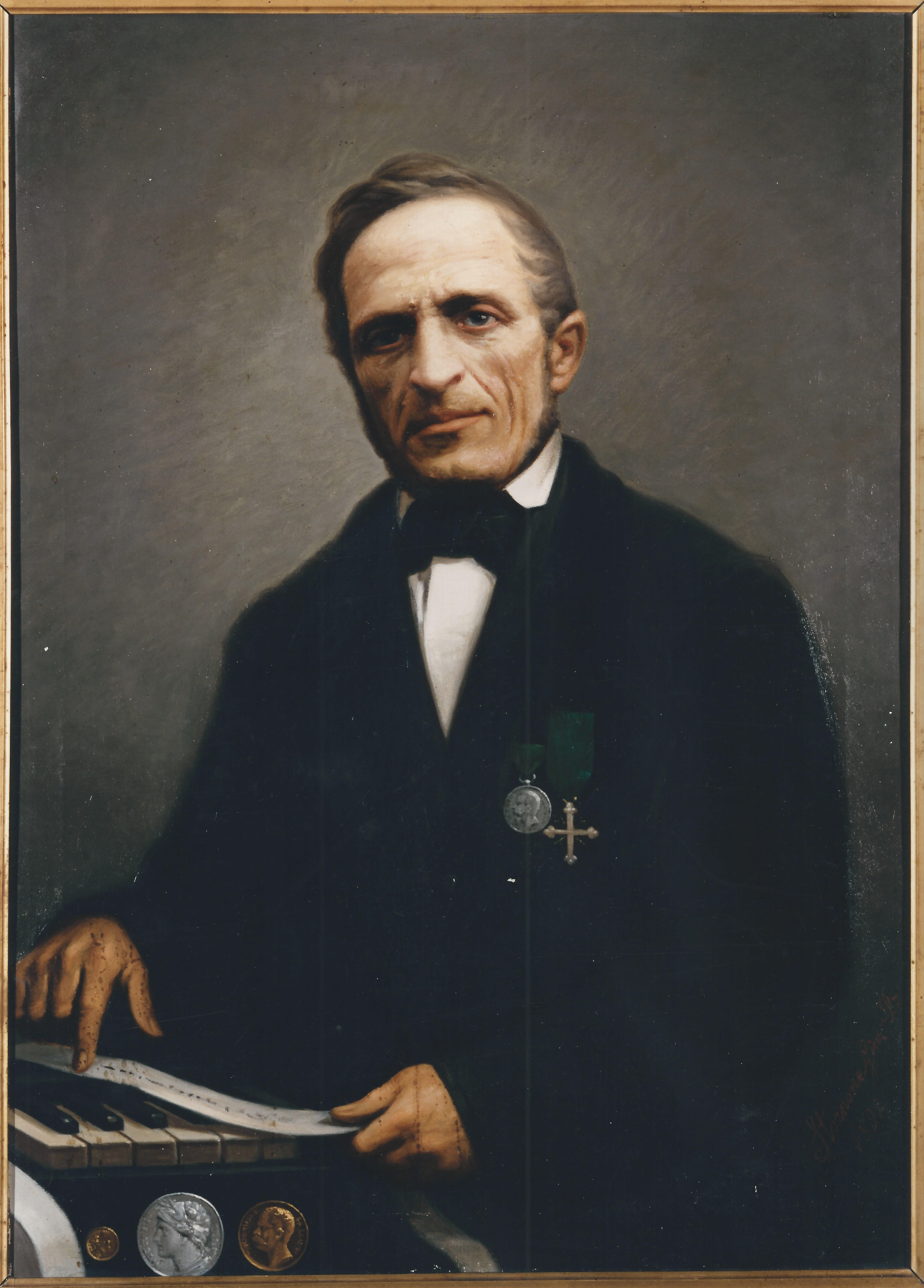
Antonio Michela Zucco

The village of Cortereggio is characterized by a very compact urban structure with an orthogonal layout. The narrow streets are lined with numerous farmhouses with arcades, wood sheds, and barns that extend along the roadside, followed by courtyards, stables, and residential parts further inside. At the centre of the hamlet is the church dedicated to the Nativity of the Virgin Mary, which was long a semi-autonomous chaplaincy under the jurisdiction of the archpriest of San Giorgio. On the feast of the Nativity of the Virgin, the patroness of the local church, there is a procession where young women of the village carry "caritore," characteristic flower-decorated cones, on their heads. Cortereggio also celebrates the patronal feast of Saint Lucina, which falls on June 30; it is celebrated on the last Sunday of June or the first Sunday of July with a procession through the village streets, carrying an effigy of the martyr saint.

Currently, the territory of Cortereggio, like that of the main town San Giorgio, is part of the diocese of Ivrea, but until 1805 the spiritual jurisdiction over Cortereggio was exercised by the abbot nullius of San Benigno di Fruttuaria.

The most famous citizen of Cortereggio was Antonio Michela Zucco, born here on February 1, 1815, and who died in Quassolo on December 24, 1886. From a young age, he conceived the idea of a universal alphabet "that would increasingly bring people together in their relationships, interests, and expressions of their feelings". From theoretical studies, he moved to practical application and in 1863 first presented his stenography system "using an instantaneous syllabic process for universal use with a small portable keyboard device" at the Second Pedagogical Congress (Milan, Palazzo Brera). Thus, the Michela Machine was born.

At the San Giorgio Canavese Civic Museum “Nòssi Ràis” the Michela Machine and the mechanism of the clock made in the eighteenth century by the watchmaker Domenico Massa for the bell tower of Cortereggio are preserved.

== The Piattella canavesana of Cortereggio ==
Cortereggio is a production area for the Piattella canavesana of Cortereggio (faseul ëd Cortress in Piedmontese), a local variety of bean. It is described as a "white, kidney-shaped bean, quite flat - hence the name piattella - with a very thin skin due to the low concentration of calcium in the soil. The piattelle were an important economic resource for local families, who sold them to customers throughout Canavese. Traditionally, they were sown together with corn, whose plants acted as supports for the legume plants”. Starting in the 1980s, production was gradually abandoned, and cultivation was maintained only for family use by a few local farmers. In 1981, however, farmer Mario Boggio delivered a few kilogrammes of this bean to the germplasm bank at the Faculty of Agricultural Sciences of the University of Turin, to preserve the seed. Thanks to Mario Boggio's foresight, the cultivation of the piattella has been revived by the farmers of Cortereggio, who have formed an association to recover and promote this ancient crop. Since 2010, the Piattella canavesana of Cortereggio has been a Slow Food Presidium.

== See also ==
- San Giorgio Canavese

== Bibliography ==
- Bertolotti Antonino, Passeggiate nel Canavese, Ivrea, Curbis, 1868, vol. II, pp. 72–96.
- Fassino Gianpaolo, Presìdi Slow Food e buone pratiche di comunità. Il caso della Piattella canavesana di Cortereggio, in Quando il cibo si fa benessere. Alimentazione e qualità della vita, edited by Paolo Corvo and Gianpaolo Fassino, Milano, Franco Angeli, 2015, pp. 191–205.
- Guida ai Presìdi Slow Food: per scoprire i prodotti che raccontano l'Italia, le osterie che li cucinano, mangiare e dormire dai produttori, Bra, Slow Food, 2012, p. 174.
