= Malgrà Castle =

Castle in Piedmont, Italy

- Castello di Malgrà
- Rivarolo Canavese, Piedmont, Italy
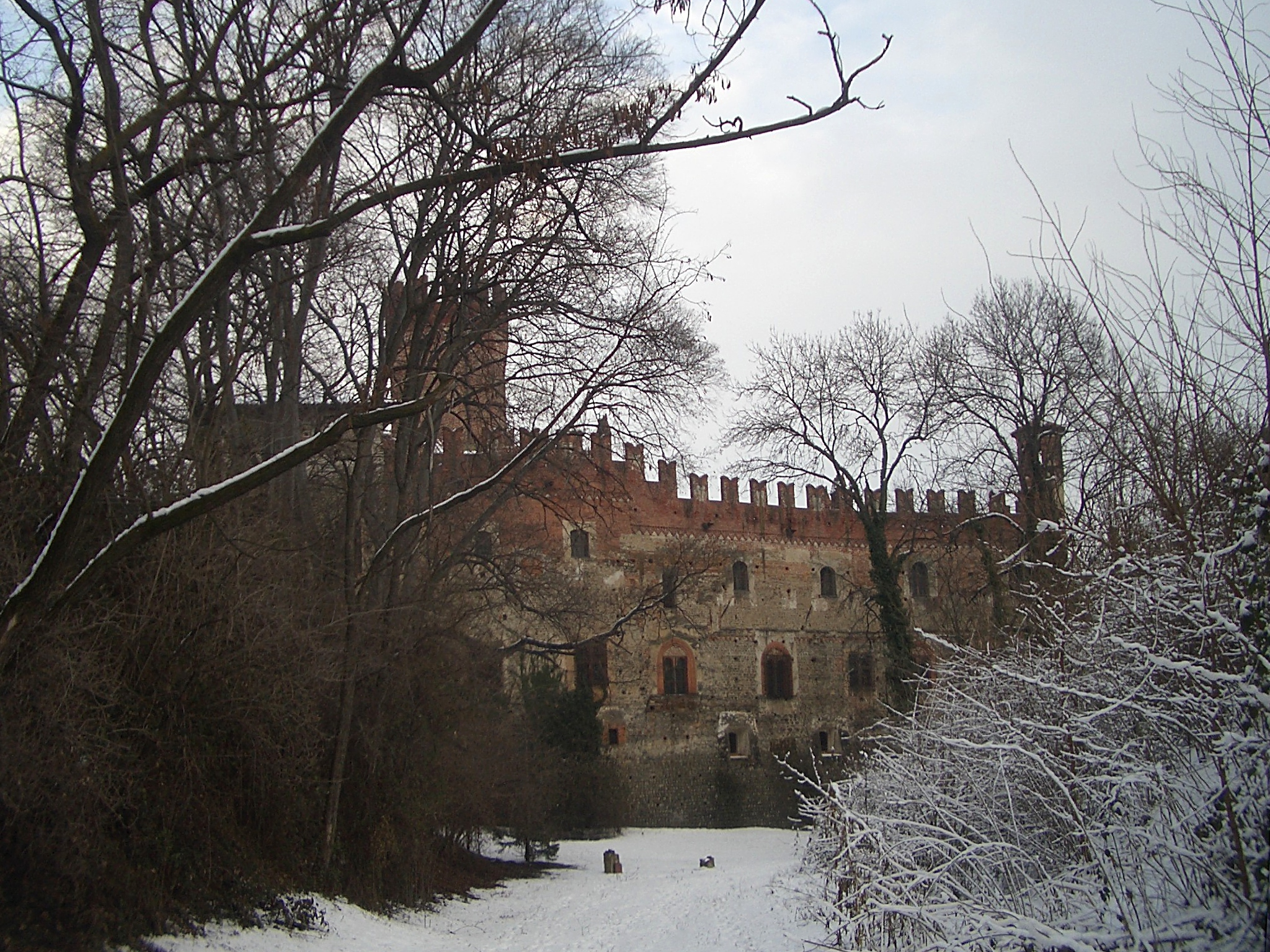
- Malgrà Castle

Site information
- Type: Castle
- Owner: Municipality of Rivarolo Canavese

Location
- Location in Italy
- Coordinates: 45°19′47.6″N 7°43′47.64″E

Site history
- Built: 14th century
- Built by: Counts of San Martino
- Materials: Stone, brick

Malgrà Castle (Italian: Castello di Malgrà) is a castle located in Rivarolo Canavese, Piedmont, Italy.

== History ==
The castle was built in the 14th century by the Counts of San Martino as a military structure but later transformed into a noble residence. Initially, the building consisted of two separate wings and a tall defensive keep. Over time, expansions included the addition of an extra floor to the west wing and the enhancement of the structure with frescoes above the main entrance and beneath the porch inside the courtyard.

At the beginning of the 17th century, the complex was acquired by the Gria family and later by the Cortina di Favria family. From the 17th century onwards, the northern wing was adapted to include large halls with floral-decorated vaulted ceilings, which are now used for temporary exhibitions. The architect Boggio di San Giorgio designed the elegant staircase leading to the first-floor corridor, characterized by large arched windows overlooking the surrounding countryside.

Towards the end of the 19th century, the castle underwent a major restoration works under the direction of Alfredo d’Andrade and his collaborator Carlo Nigra.

== Gallery ==
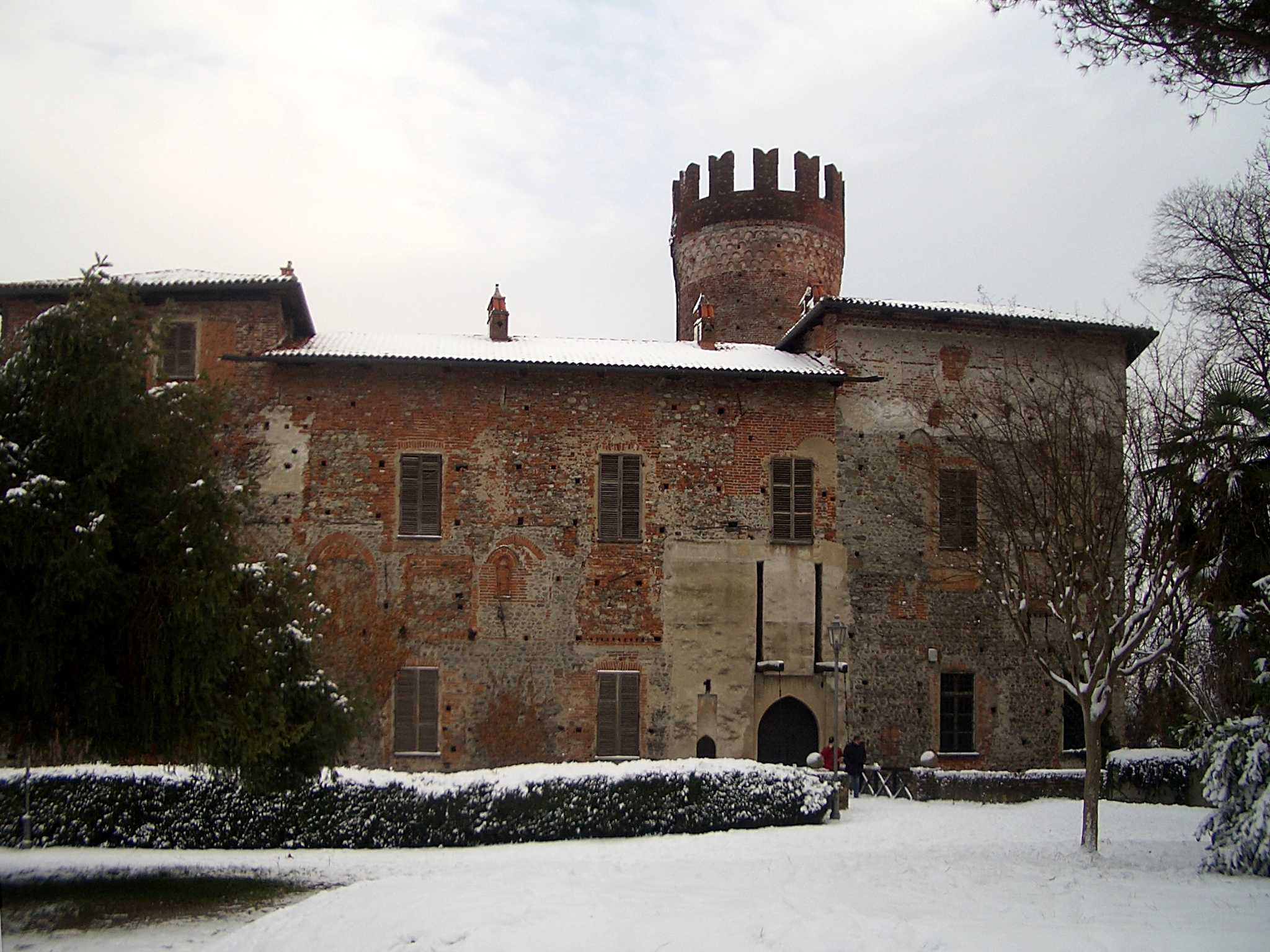

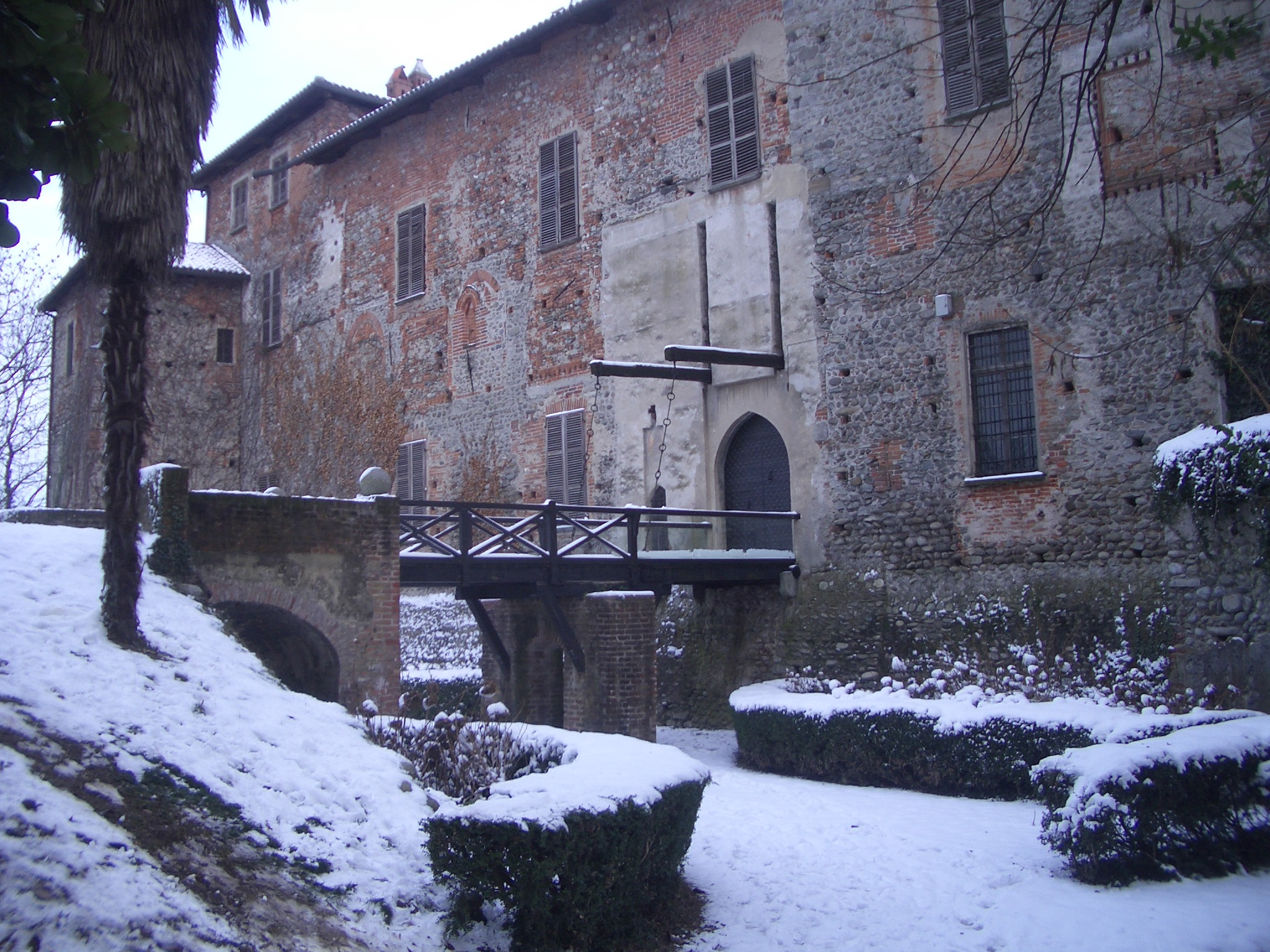
