= Brandizzo railway station =

Railway station in Italy

Brandizzo
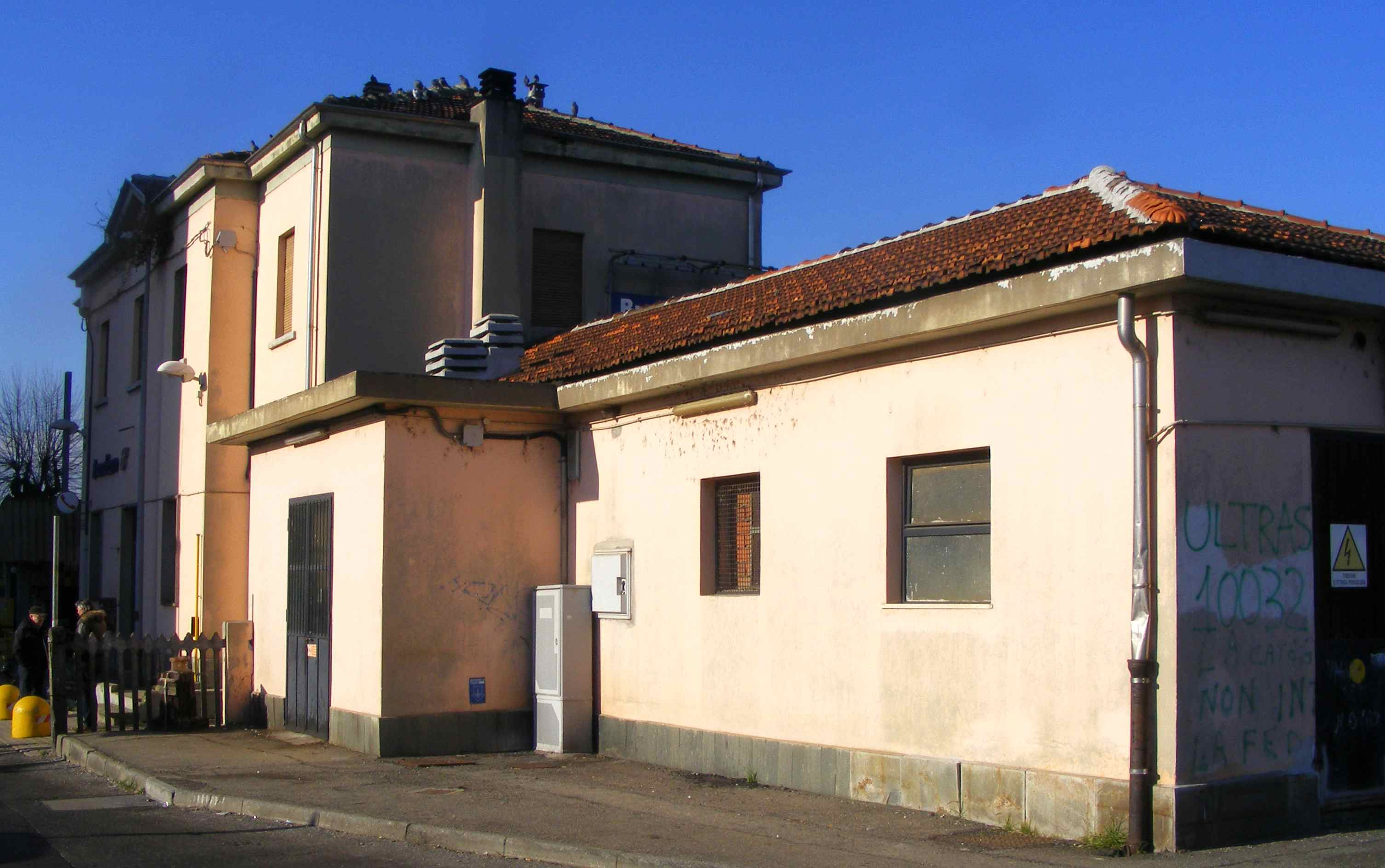

General information
- Location: Piazza Stazione 1, Brandizzo; Brandizzo, Metropolitan City of Turin, Piedmont; Italy
- Coordinates: 45.1788°N 7.8412°E
- Owner: Rete Ferroviaria Italiana
- Operator: Rete Ferroviaria Italiana
- Line: Turin – Milan
- Train operators: Rete Ferroviaria Italiana
- Connections: Local buses
Location
- Location within Piedmont Location within Northern Italy Location within Italy

Brandizzo railway station (Italian: Stazione di Brandizzo) serves the town and comune of Brandizzo, in the Piedmont region, of northwestern Italy.

== History ==
The station was activated in 1856, as part of the first section of the Turin-Novara line.

Since 2012 it has been on the SFM2 line of the Turin metropolitan railway service. Trains on this line pass through Turin city centre.

Soon after midnight on 31 August 2023, an empty passenger train being used to transport wagons between stations ran over a team of track maintenance workers. The impact killed five people, while two others were taken to the hospital despite being unharmed.

== Structures and plants ==
The station consists of two through platforms.

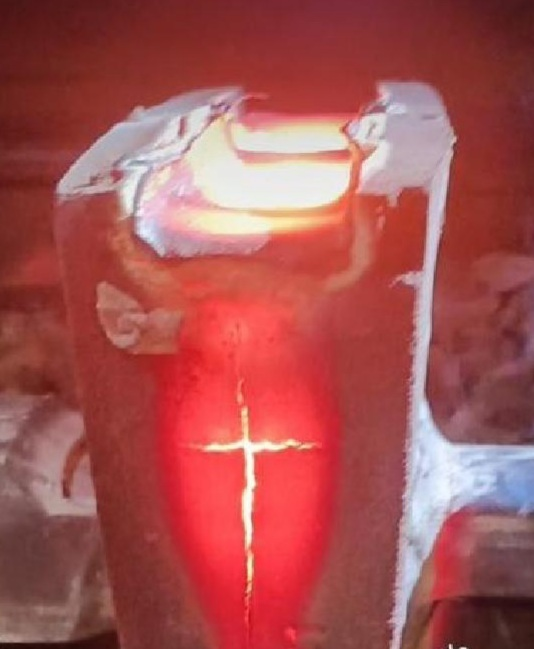
La croce fu attribuita ad un operaio a seguito dell'incidente

== Services ==
Preceding station	Turin SFM	Following station
Chivasso Terminus	SFM2	Settimo towards Pinerolo

== Exchanges ==
Near the station there are stops for various lines of the extra-urban bus network.
