= Giorgio di Biandrate =

Italian Roman Catholic saint

The Blessed Giorgio di Biandrate, or Giorgio da Orazio di Biandrate (died 1483) was a member of the family of the counts of San Giorgio Canavese in north-west Italy. His body is interred in the parish church of San Giorgio Canavese. A memorial tablet, set in the passageway between the north entrance to the church and the choir, records the miracles which he is said to have performed both before and after his death.
