= Foglizzo Castle =

Castle in Piedmont, Italy

- Castello di Foglizzo
- Foglizzo, Piedmont, Italy
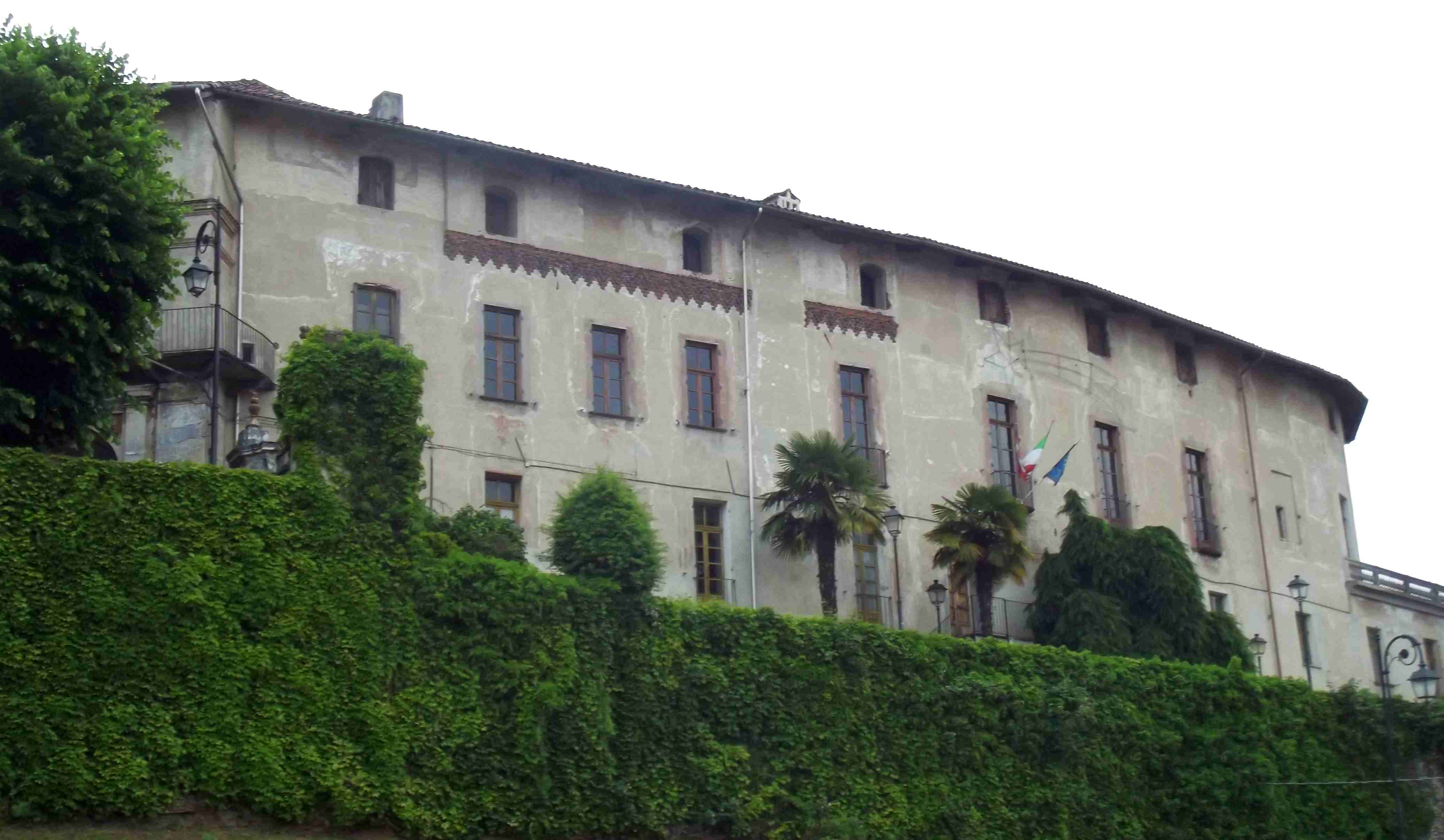
- Foglizzo Castle in 2014

Site information
- Type: Castle

Location
- Coordinates: 45°16′19.2″N 7°49′23.52″E

Foglizzo Castle (Italian: Castello di Foglizzo) is a castle located in Foglizzo, Piedmont, Italy.

== History ==
The origins of Foglizzo Castle likely date back to the late ancient period. In particular, during the Middle Ages, the castle served as both a defensive stronghold and a refuge, owing to its strategic position overlooking the village of Foglizzo and the surrounding plains.

In 1140, Emperor Conrad III of Germany granted Guido III Biandrate possession of Foglizzo. Guido III, a captain of the imperial militias in Novara.

In 1234, Guido's grandson, Pietro I, became the founder of the Foglizzo branch of the Biandrate family. He was granted dominion over Foglizzo, Balangero, and Mathi by the Marquess of Montferrat. During this period, the Biandrate family initiated the reconstruction of the castle, featuring an imposing perimeter wall. Later, houses were built against this fortification, forming a "ricetto" (a fortified shelter for villagers), which disappeared in the 18th century.

The northwest wing of the castle, characterized by brick corbels, is the main surviving structure from the 14th century. In the 15th century, an additional three-story building was constructed on the northeast side, originally featuring a loggia, which was enclosed in the 19th century.

The most significant architectural modifications took place in the 16th century. Guido Biandrate, known as "the Senior," and his nephew transformed the fortress into a lavish Renaissance residence. In the 17th century, the southern wing was built, incorporating two pre-existing towers.

By the 18th century, the castle had lost its military function and was converted into a countryside residence, as the Biandrate family had permanently settled in Turin. After the Biandrate family sold the castle to Turin-based merchant family, the municipality of Foglizzo purchased the building in 1855. From then on, the castle became a central hub for the town's administration and social life. It housed schools until 1970 and continues to serve as the seat of the municipal offices, the town library, and medical facilities.
