= San Michele Arcangelo, Rivarolo Canavese =

Church building in Rivarolo Canavese, Italy

Coordinates: 45°20′00″N 7°43′34″E

San Michele Arcangelo (St Michael Archangel) is a Baroque-style, Roman Catholic church located in the town of Rivarolo Canavese, a town in the Metropolitan City of Turin, region of Piedmont, Italy.

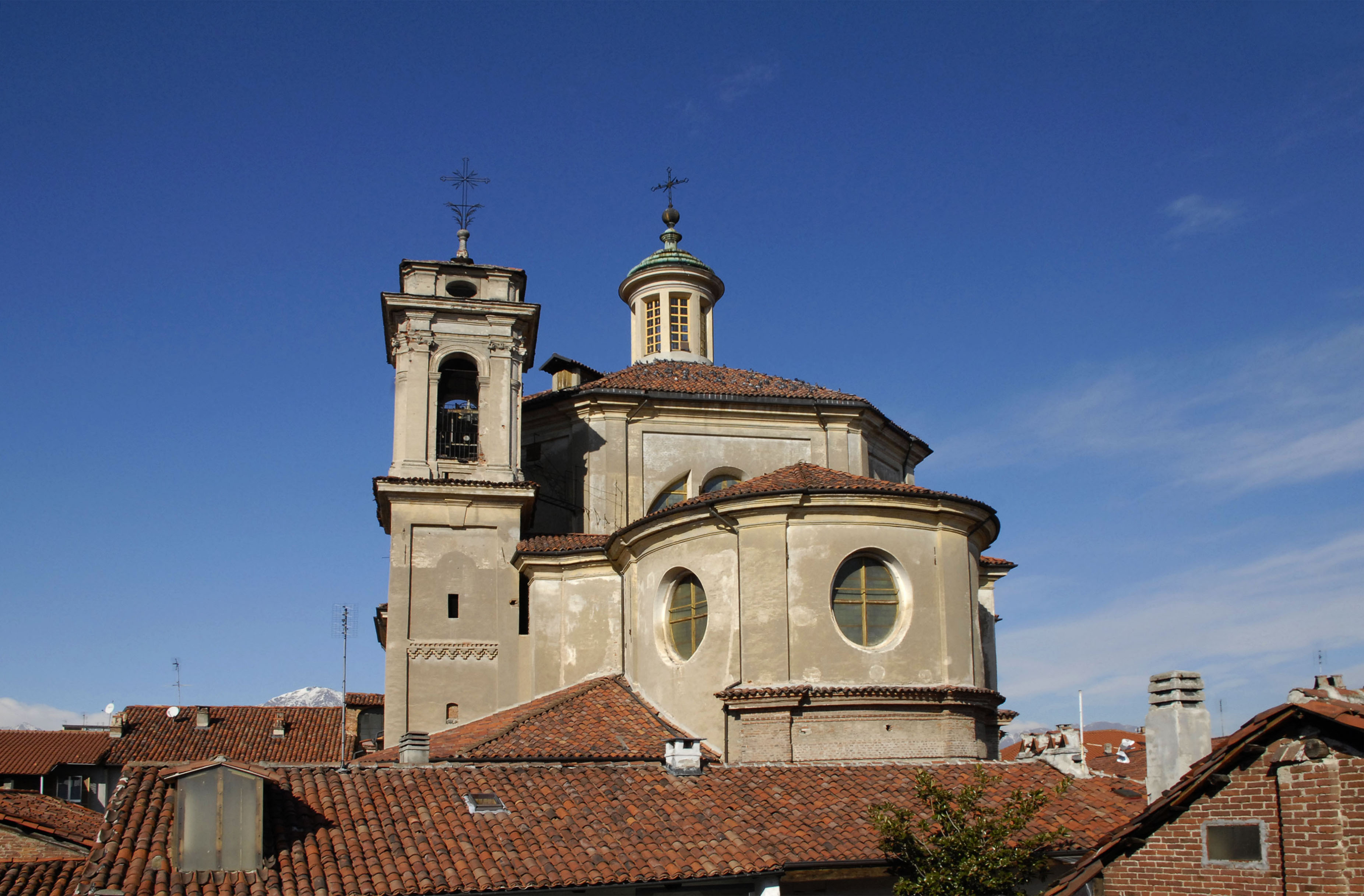
Dome and belltower

This church was designed by the architect Bernardo Vittone and completed in 1759. However, there are notes that suggest a much earlier origin to a religious edifice at the site, dating to before the year 100, perhaps under the Lombard kingdom of Italy. The present church is made mostly from brick with some stone elements such as the capitals of columns and pilasters. The layout is octagonal with a central dome. There are two lateral chapels that lobulate from the central nave. The altar is flanked by wooden statues. The facade has a Borrominesque play of concave and convex elements. The portal has an interrupted typmanum. Adjacent to the dome is a belltower.
