= Volpiano =

- Comune
- Comune di Volpiano
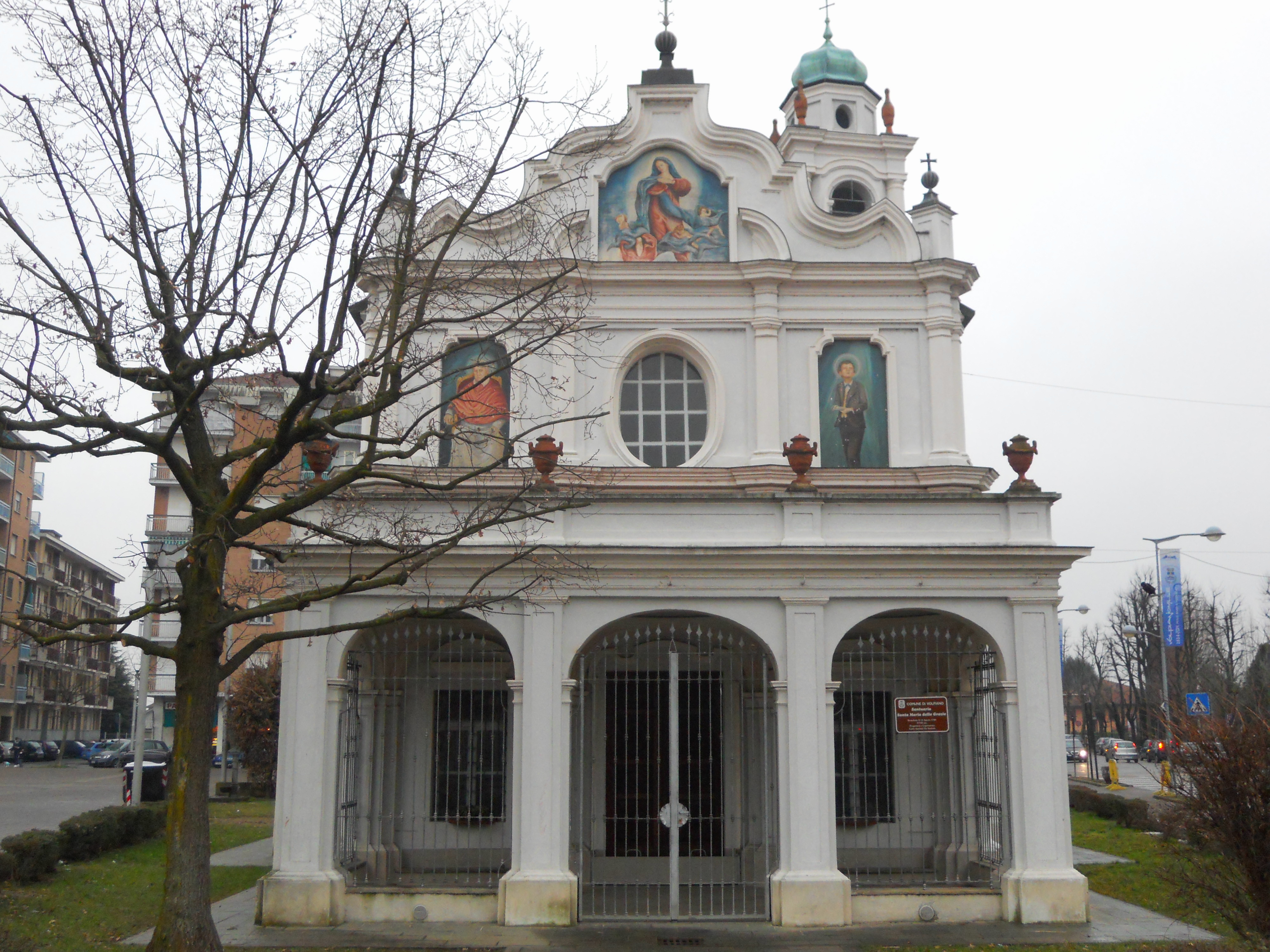
- Sanctuary of Santa Maria delle Grazie.

- Coat of arms

- Location within Italy Location within Piedmont
- Coordinates: 45°12′N 7°47′E
- Country: Italy
- Region: Piedmont
- Metropolitan city: Turin (TO)
- Frazioni: Cascine Di Malone

Government
  - Mayor: Emanuele De Zuanne

Area
  - Total: 32.4 km^{2} (12.5 sq mi)
- Elevation: 219 m (719 ft)

Population (31 January 2011)
  - Total: 15,128
  - Density: 467/km^{2} (1,210/sq mi)
- Demonym: Volpianesi
- Time zone: UTC+1 (CET)
  - Summer (DST): UTC+2 (CEST)
- Postal code: 10088
- Dialing code: 011
- Patron saint: Santi Pietro e Paolo
- Saint day: 29 giugno
- Website: Official website

Volpiano is a comune (municipality) in the Metropolitan City of Turin, in the Italian region Piedmont. The city is located about 15 km north-east of Turin.

== Economy ==
It is an industrial (fuel, transportation, electronic, for example ) and agricultural (wheat, corn) center in the lower Canavese. Companies based in Volpiano include:

- Osella
- SPEA
- Sparco

== Transport ==
- Autostrada A5
- Volpiano railway station
- Settimo Torinese–Pont Canavese railway

== Twin towns ==
Volpiano is twinned with:

- Castries, Hérault, France (2010)
