= Justus of Trieste =

Italian saint (d. 293)

Saint Justus of Trieste
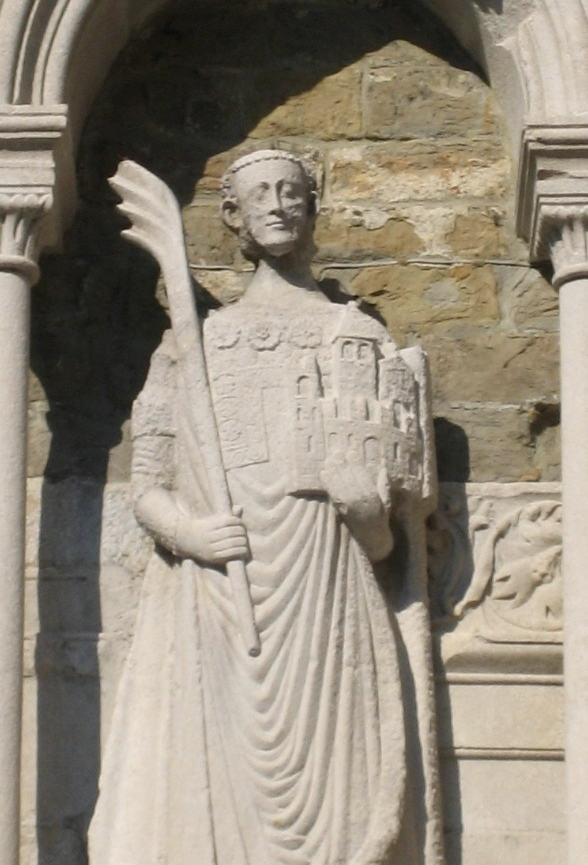
- Saint Justus on the bell tower of Trieste Cathedral

Martyr
- Died: 293; Gulf of Trieste
- Venerated in: Eastern Orthodox Church; Roman Catholic Church
- Canonized: Pre-Congregation
- Feast: 2 November
- Attributes: Spear, flowers across his chest and holding a palm and cathedral
- Patronage: Labin, Croatia; Misilmeri, Sicily; San Giusto Canavese, Italy

Saint Justus of Trieste (also Justus the Martyr, Just of Trieste; Italian: San Giusto di Trieste, San Giusto martire; Slovene: Sveti Just Tržaški, Sv. Just mučenik; died on 2 November 293) is a saint venerated in the Eastern Orthodox Church and Roman Catholic Church.

== Biography ==
According to his passio (account of his trial and death), he was a citizen of Trieste in Italy, known for his works and charities. When charges of being a Christian were brought against him by his fellow citizens, he was tried according to Roman law. Since he refused to sacrifice to the Roman gods, he was found guilty of sacrilegium and sentenced to death by drowning. According to a local tradition, he was thrown from a small boat into the Gulf of Trieste, off of the present-day promontory of Sant'Andrea.

On the night of Justus' death the presbyter (priest or bishop) Sebastian was told in a dream that Justus' body had been washed ashore in spite of the weights meant to hold it down. Sebastian gathered his fellow believers and they went searching for the body, which they found on what is today Riva Grumula. Justus was then buried not far from the shore where he had been found. In late antique times the area near Piazza Hortis in Trieste was a cemeterial one and there is a good possibility that the former basilica of the Holy Martyrs at the corner of Via Ciamician and Via Duca d'Aosta was built on Justus' tomb.

In the Middle Ages, the body of Justus was translated to a chapel adjacent to the church of Mary Mother of God (the present-day Duomo), attested since the 6th century. When, in the 10th or 11th century, the chapel was joined to the church, the cathedral, though dedicated to Mary Mother of God, became known as the Cathedral of Saint Justus.

== Veneration ==
He is the patron saint of the city and diocese of Trieste. He is also patron saint of Albona (in Istria), San Giusto Canavese and Misilmeri in Sicily.

His feast day is 2 November, but the celebration of it is postponed for liturgical reasons until the following day, and thus 3 November is often given as the date of the feast. Fittingly the destroyer Audace became the first Italian ship to enter the port of Trieste on the feast day in 1918.

Early representations of the saint are limited to Trieste itself, and in particular to the cathedral. They are: the silk icon in the treasury of the cathedral, the 12th century mosaic in the left apse, where Justus is shown with Saint Servulus, the Romanesque statue on the bell tower, a series of frescoes discovered in the cathedral in 1959, the miniature in the 14/15c breviary of the Chapter of the Cathedral of Trieste.

== Sources and external links ==
- Ekkart Sauser (2000). "Justus of Trieste". In Bautz, Traugott (ed.). Biographisch-Bibliographisches Kirchenlexikon (BBKL) (in German). Vol. 17. Herzberg: Bautz. col. 741. ISBN 3-88309-080-8.
- Santebeati.it: San Giusto di Trieste (in Italian)
- Acta Sanctorum November I, p. 428-430, Passio edited by Guilielmus Van Hooff. The editor used MS Lat. cl. IX, 28 (=2798) of the Biblioteca Marciana in Venice, MS Lat. 330 of the Staatsbibliothek in Vienna, and a transcript of the Passio from an unidentified codex.
- Stefano di Brazzano, Passio sancti Iusti martyris. Text drawn from various codices with introduction, notes, and translation to Italian. In: Atti e Memorie della Societa' Istriana di Archeologia e Storia Patria 98 (1998) 58–85.
- Luciana Cuppo, "Passio sancti Iusti martyris: A Late Antique Statement of Roman Identity vis-a-vis Domination from the East". In: Identity and Alterity in Hagiography and the Cult of Saints, eds. Ana Marinkovic and Trpimir Vedris (Hagiotheca: Zagreb 2010) 37–58.
