= San Giusto Canavese =

- Comune
- Comune di San Giusto Canavese
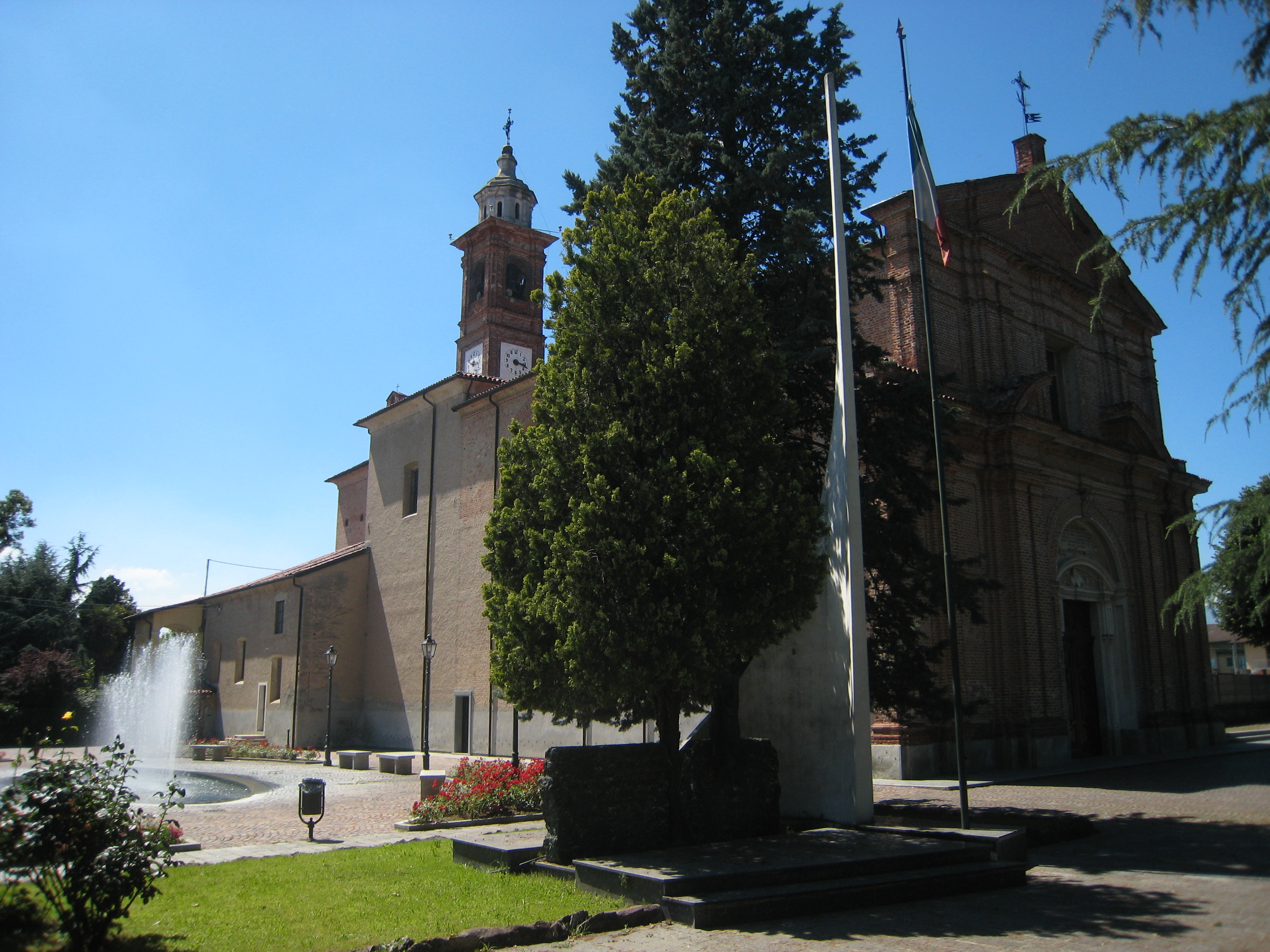
- Church of Saints Fabian and Sebastian.

- Coat of arms

- Location within Italy Location within Piedmont
- Coordinates: 45°19′N 7°49′E
- Country: Italy
- Region: Piedmont
- Metropolitan city: Turin (TO)

Government
  - Mayor: Teresa Boggio

Area
  - Total: 9.6 km^{2} (3.7 sq mi)
- Elevation: 264 m (866 ft)

Population (31 December 2010)
  - Total: 3,383
  - Density: 350/km^{2} (910/sq mi)
- Demonym: Sangiustesi
- Time zone: UTC+1 (CET)
  - Summer (DST): UTC+2 (CEST)
- Postal code: 10090
- Dialing code: 0124
- Website: Official website

San Giusto Canavese (known as 'L Zerb in Canavese dialect, turned in modern dialect as San Giust) is an Italian municipality with 3,273 inhabitants in the metropolitan city of Turin in the Piedmont region.

San Giusto Canavese borders the following municipalities: San Giorgio Canavese, Feletto, Foglizzo, and Bosconero.

== History ==
San Giusto Canavese is a young municipality whose territory historically belonged to the neighboring municipality of San Giorgio. Before gaining independence, San Giusto was indeed a hamlet of San Giorgio with the name "Gerbo Grande di San Giorgio." In fact, its inhabitants are still traditionally called "gerbolini" (they are also nicknamed with the popular Piedmontese term 'Tirapere,' meaning 'Stone-throwers' in Italian).

After at least two centuries of disputes and battles against the neighboring municipality, fought with slings and stones, on 9 October 1778, King Vittorio Amedeo III issued the decree of dismemberment, and Gerbo Grande thus gained independence from San Giorgio with the name "Cantone del Gerbo Grande."

Just under a year later, on 3 September 1779, King Vittorio Amedeo III, with a royal decree, recognized the new municipality with the name San Giusto, chosen by the inhabitants as their protector. In 1862, the name of the municipality was definitively changed to San Giusto Canavese by the decree of King Vittorio Emanuele II to avoid confusion with other "San Giusto" locations in Italy.

The contrast between the communities of San Giorgio and Gerbo Grande was rooted both in political-religious aspects and within the class struggle since the people of San Giusto were mainly farmers, traders, and small landowners, while the people of San Giorgio were represented by nobles (Biandrate lineage) and artisans from the castle district of Biandrate. The aspiration of the Gerbolini (inhabitants of Gerbo, or 'L Zerb) was to achieve both the independence of their municipality and their parish. To achieve this, they carried out a bloody and sometimes violent struggle that divided the two communities (San Giusto and San Giorgio), which are only 3 kilometers apart, and gave the Sangiustesi the nickname 'Tirapere,' based on the type of "weapons" they used in battle.

After achieving administrative independence, even while paying hefty taxes to the Kingdom of Sardinia (money collected through a collection among Sangiustesi household heads), the struggle continued fiercely to obtain their own parish and priest. The reasons were linked to the fact that the authorities of San Giorgio prevented San Giusto from having a priest in order to channel the faithful (and their offerings) to their own parish. The community of San Giusto, now more numerous than San Giorgio, had been working for about fifty years to build a new Baroque church (the Church of Saints Fabiano and Sebastiano), but the bishop, under pressure from the noble Sangiorgesi, did not recognize it.

An emblematic episode of this rivalry, which actually occurred in 1750 during religious processions for the blessing of the fields, was the theft of the crucifix from the church of San Giorgio, carried out by a group of Gerbolini on the border of the two towns. This gesture created a strong impression throughout Canavese and gave rise to the nickname 'Rubacristi' (Christ-thieves) for the inhabitants of San Giusto. The Gerbolini responded to the nickname given to them by the people of San Giorgio by calling them 'Mangia-Cristiani' (Christian-eaters), referring to the case of "Jena," a butcher sentenced to death for numerous crimes and accused of making sausages with the flesh of his young victims.

After heated discussions, well-documented in the records of the time, the curia granted a priest to San Giusto, and the relic was returned, but the nicknames remained.

Scant and incomplete are the traces of the inhabitants of the plain of San Giusto before the 18th century. The oldest artifact found in the area is a trough for watering animals, bearing the date 1606. Its sole value lies in the fact that it has been in the same location for many decades, testifying to the connection between the Sangiustesi and the work of farmers and breeders, still significantly present in the social life of the village today.

Regarding the first evidence of human settlement in the area, there is a document mentioned, drafted by the counts of Biandrate in 1174. It attests to the bequest by Guido di Biandrate of a Mansio and the corresponding lands and adjacent woods located in the region called Ruspaglie (southeast of San Giusto Canavese) to the Knights Templar.

== Society ==
=== Demographic evolution ===
The demographic evolution of the country has generally followed that of the entire Canavese region, with a decrease during the years of economic boom, linked to migration towards the city of Turin and the gradual abandonment of rural areas, followed by an increase starting from the 1980s. In the last ten years, the favorable combination of being a town (without districts with apartment buildings), where 95% of homes have a garden, and having companies in its territory that employ hundreds of workers in the tertiary sector (Telecittà Studios) has led to a significant increase in residents.

== Urban Structure ==
The structure of the settlement is, to say the least, peculiar: the construction of the buildings did not proceed outward from the original core but rather from the four corners of an imaginary square, converging towards the center, which is constituted by the Baroque church of Saints Fabiano and Sebastiano.

This particular method of urban planning, starting from the 1800s, allowed for the creation of residences with vegetable gardens and gardens, interspersed with squares and numerous parks, connected by very wide avenues with tree-lined side streets. The purpose of this urban plan was indeed to "fill" the large empty space that existed between the four "hamlets," located at the four corners of this enormous open area, to connect them to the central Baroque church, built starting from 1697. The final result, comparable to the enlightened ideals of a "Garden City," presents a town with a large area but low population density, a result of the almost complete absence of popular neighborhoods with apartment buildings.

The settlement appears to consist mostly of buildings constructed from 1850 onward, although strolling through the tree-lined streets, one comes across some eighteenth-century rural houses. Architecturally distinctive is the long tree-lined avenue that cuts the town in half in a north-south direction, consisting of three alternating varieties of "Prunus" with leaves and flowers of different colors. There is also a grassy side street separated from the main road by 50-centimeter-deep ditches, a legacy of the area's agricultural past.

The incorporation of extensive portions of the countryside within the town has resulted in the presence, still visible today, of numerous votive columns within the settlement and many open irrigation ditches on the sides of the streets. The historical center is not present in a classical form but in the form of a lawn (Gerbido) measuring 50 m x 80 m, left to remind of the rural origins of the settlement and called Piazza Vittorio Veneto.

== Key Historical Attraction ==
Facing the square are the oldest buildings: the Baroque church, the eighteenth-century sacristy with a completely frescoed vault, and, slightly shifted, the old wing of the Municipal Palace, housing the council hall from the early nineteenth century. In the center of the town opens the large park of an eighteenth-century private villa, while, leaving the town towards Cortereggio (a hamlet of San Giorgio Canavese), you come across another eighteenth-century villa, currently serving as a nursing home. To the south of the settlement is the area called the Commenda, where in the 1200s, the Knights Templar owned a mansio. What remains visible is the church of San Giacomo di Ruspaglia, already located in the territory of the neighboring town but dependent on the parish of San Giusto. Of the farmhouse of the Commenda, the main building of the mansio, only indications and legends remain.

== Religious Tradition ==
The major religious traditions include the celebration of the Madonna della Contrada, the procession of the Madonna delle Vacche, and the rosary at the chapel of "Marengh".

The celebration of the Madonna della Contrada takes place around mid-September at the votive column in the Contrada neighborhood. On the third Sunday of September, a Mass is held at the Church of Saints Fabiano and Sebastiano, followed by a procession in honor of the Madonna to the votive column of Contrada. This celebration is preceded by nine days of evening rosaries at the same votive column. The origins of this devotion can be traced back to the middle of World War II when the inhabitants of Contrada made a vow to build a votive column and celebrate the Madonna every year if all the sons engaged in the war returned home alive. At the end of the war, gradually all the sons of the Contrada's residents returned, except one who was lost during the terrible Russian retreat of 1943 and declared missing. Around 1948, this son returned home from the Siberian lands, where he had been a prisoner of war for five years. In gratitude, the residents of Contrada built the votive column dedicated to the Madonna. The votive column, expanded over the years to the size of a chapel, is managed by the inhabitants of Contrada.

The procession of the Madonna delle Vacche, on the other hand, commemorates a vow dating back to 1752. In that year, a terrible epidemic was devastating the herds of the Gerbo's inhabitants. To ward off the severe famine, all the heads of families in the town vowed to the Madonna to end the epidemic. Two days later, the epidemic ceased, sparing the rest of the herds. Since then, every year on that specific day, all the inhabitants gather for the evening Mass at the Church of Saints Fabiano and Sebastiano and participate in the procession through the streets of the town. This vow has been passed down and honored until today, in times of peace as well as in times of war, and has received permission from the Pope to grant a Plenary Indulgence (the forgiveness of all sins) to those who participate in the ritual.

The chapel of "Marengh", built by Giovanni Maria Petrini in 1804 on the main road towards San Giorgio C.se in honor of the Sorrowful Virgin, underwent various challenges over the centuries (it was even set on fire). Thanks to the zeal of Don Biagio Petrini (son of Geometer Petrini), the votive shrine was restored and adorned with exquisite stuccos and paintings. Since 1965, the chapel has been reconsecrated, and in May, the rosary is recited for four evenings. In September, the actual celebration takes place with three evenings of rosary recitation and a Sunday afternoon Mass. This chapel is now privately owned and managed by the descendants of the Petrini family.

== Events ==
The events that traditionally enliven the town of San Giusto are concentrated in September with "Stèmber al Zerb" (September in Gerbido), in March with "Carnevalone Sangiustese", and in June with sports events.

The program of "Stèmber al Zerb", which serves as a complement to the religious celebration of the Madonna della Contrada, begins on the third Saturday of September with the traditional evening Mass at the Contrada Votive Column, followed by the Filarmonica Sangiustese concert held in front of the same column the following afternoon. The following week features three evenings (Saturday, Sunday, and Monday) themed around cuisine (barbecue, fish dinner, polenta) and dances at the Pluriuso hall.

The "Carnevalone", held during Lent, involves animated floats and walking groups and traditionally concludes the carnival festivities.

In the spring and summer months, tournaments such as football (Memorial Massimiliano Sansoè), beach volleyball, Open Sports Days, and mini-Olympics are concentrated at the Dr. Franco Cerutti Municipal Sports Center.

== Sports ==
The numerous sports facilities in the town have facilitated the development of a significant sports activity.

At PalaZerb, the sports hall of San Giusto Canavese, the following organizations are based:

1. JUDO CLUB YAMA ARASHI: Boasting a strong sporting tradition at both national and regional levels, the club achieved various national titles in the 1990s with athlete Lara Boggio. Today, it maintains a Judo school with several dozen young participants. For years, the main event for Judo Club has been the Memorial Galasso, a regionally significant tournament.
2. ASD SANGIUSTESE VOLLEY: Established in 1998, the organization includes a Senior Women's team, a Senior Men's team, an Under-15 Women's team, and an Under-13 Women's team. The Senior Men's team won the Provincial CSI title in 2003/2004 and 2004/2005.

At the Dr. Franco Cerutti Municipal Sports Center, named after San Giusto native Franco Cerutti, who played a key role in the construction of this modern gathering place in the late 1960s, the following organizations are based:

1. TENNIS CLUB SANGIUSTESE: Manages a synthetic tennis court and a clay tennis court, organizes tennis courses, amateur tournaments, and participates in the Coppa Italia tennis competition with two teams.
2. ATLETICO 1912 SANGIUSTESE: Very active at the youth level, the club plays at the Franco Cerutti Stadium in San Giusto Canavese, authorized for Lega Pro matches of the FIGC.

Traditionally, in the month of June, all Sangiustese sports associations organize an Open Sports Day to encourage young people to engage in sports activities.
