= San Benigno Canavese =

- Comune
- Comune di San Benigno Canavese
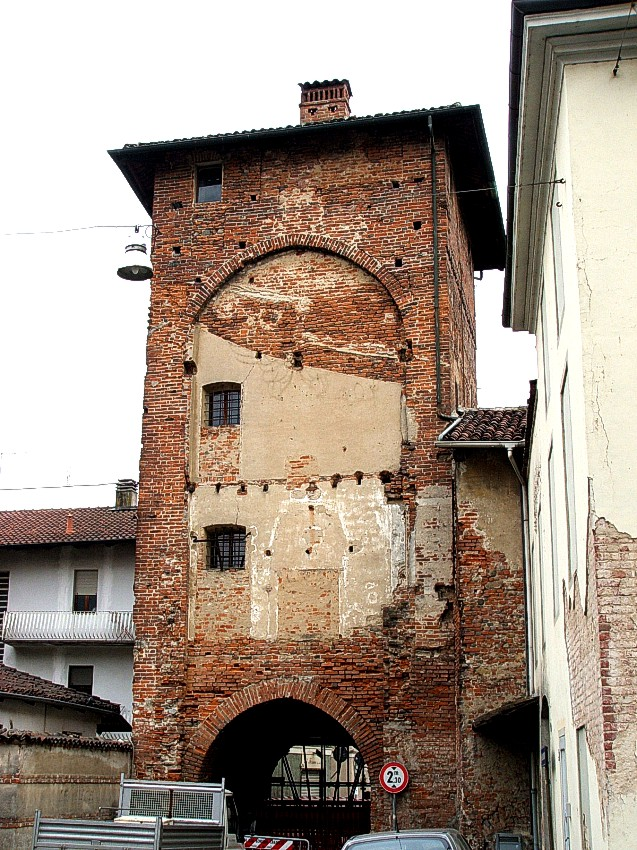
- The Ricetto gate.

- Coat of arms

- Location within Italy Location within Piedmont
- Coordinates: 45°13′26″N 7°46′57″E
- Country: Italy
- Region: Piedmont
- Metropolitan city: Turin (TO)
- Frazioni: Cascina Mure, Cascina Bruciata

Government
  - Mayor: Giorgio Culasso

Area
  - Total: 22.2 km^{2} (8.6 sq mi)
- Elevation: 194 m (636 ft)

Population (Dec. 2004)
  - Total: 5,307
  - Density: 239/km^{2} (619/sq mi)
- Demonym: Sambenignesi
- Time zone: UTC+1 (CET)
  - Summer (DST): UTC+2 (CEST)
- Postal code: 10080
- Dialing code: 011
- Patron saint: San Tiburzio
- Saint day: July 14
- Website: Official website

San Benigno Canavese (Piedmontese: San Balègn) is a comune (municipality) in the Metropolitan City of Turin in the Italian region Piedmont, located about 20 km (12 mi) northeast of Turin, whose territory is bordered by the Malone and Orco rivers.

== Main sights ==
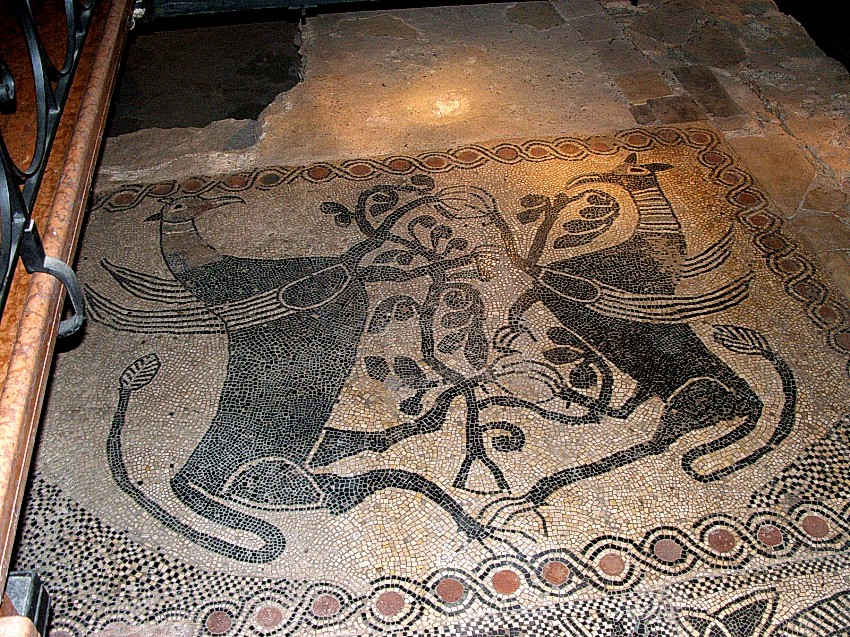
Griffons Mosaic

- Fruttuaria Abbey (founded in 1003). Of the original Romanesque edifice, only the bell tower remains today.
- Griffons Mosaic, considered amongst the most notable example of mosaic art in Piedmont.
- Ricetto ("Fortified store", 15th century), of which one of the three gates and a corner tower are visible today.
- San Benigno Canavese railway station
