= Rivarolo Canavese =

- Comune
- Comune di Rivarolo Canavese
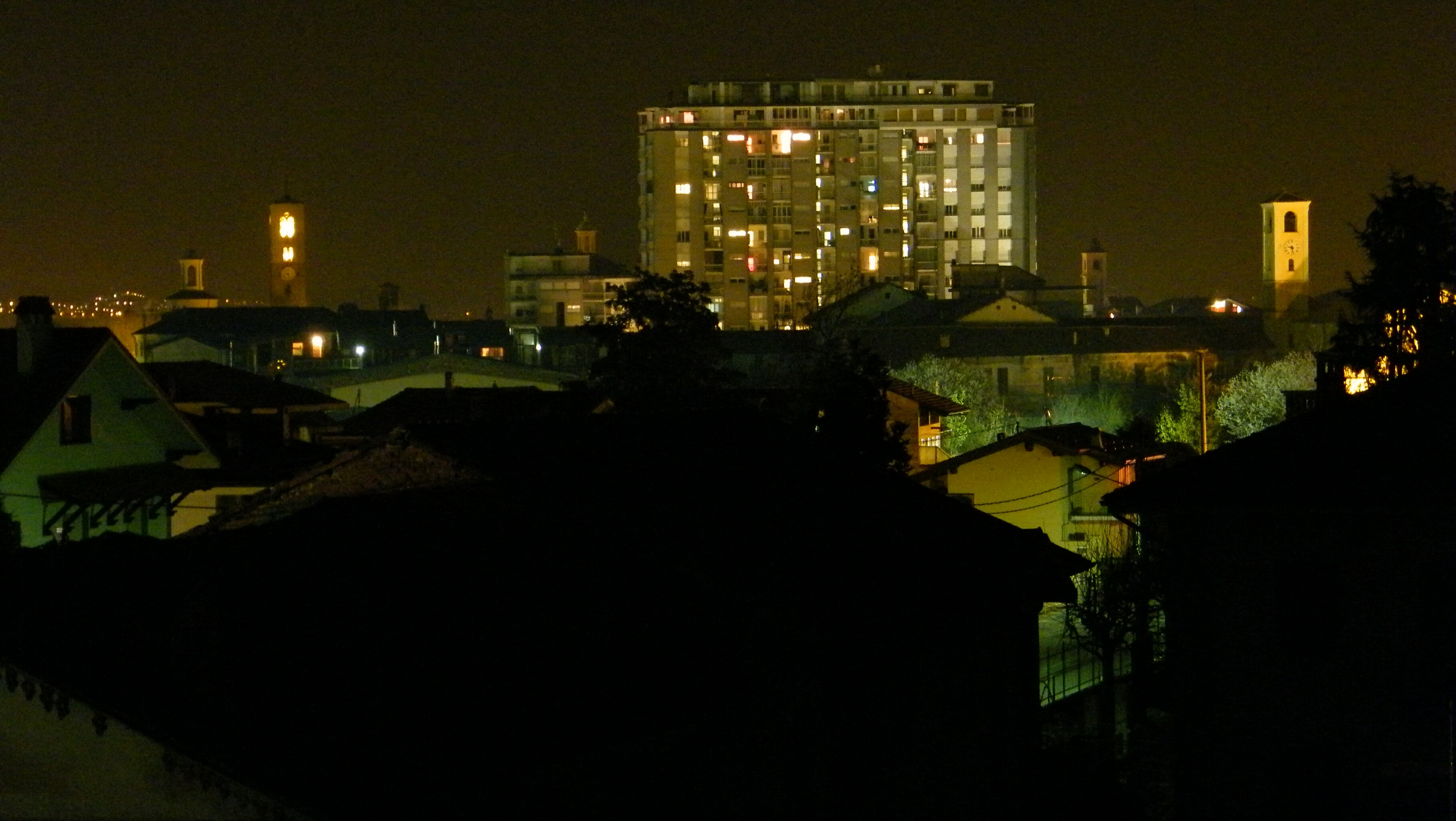
- Rivarolo Canavese by night

- Coat of arms

- Location within Italy Location within Piedmont
- Coordinates: 45°20′N 7°43′E
- Country: Italy
- Region: Piedmont
- Metropolitan city: Turin (TO)
- Frazioni: Argentera, Bonaudi, Paglie, Pasquaro, Praglie, Sant'Anna, Vesignano

Government
  - Mayor: Alberto Rostagno

Area
  - Total: 32.25 km^{2} (12.45 sq mi)
- Elevation: 304 m (997 ft)

Population (31 December 2015)
  - Total: 12,488
  - Density: 387.2/km^{2} (1,003/sq mi)
- Demonym: Rivarolesi
- Time zone: UTC+1 (CET)
  - Summer (DST): UTC+2 (CEST)
- Postal code: 10086
- Dialing code: 0124
- Patron saint: Saint James
- Saint day: 25 July
- Website: www.rivarolocanavese.it

Rivarolo Canavese is a comune (municipality) in the Metropolitan City of Turin in the Italian region of Piedmont, located about 30 kilometres (19 mi) north of Turin.

== Main sights ==
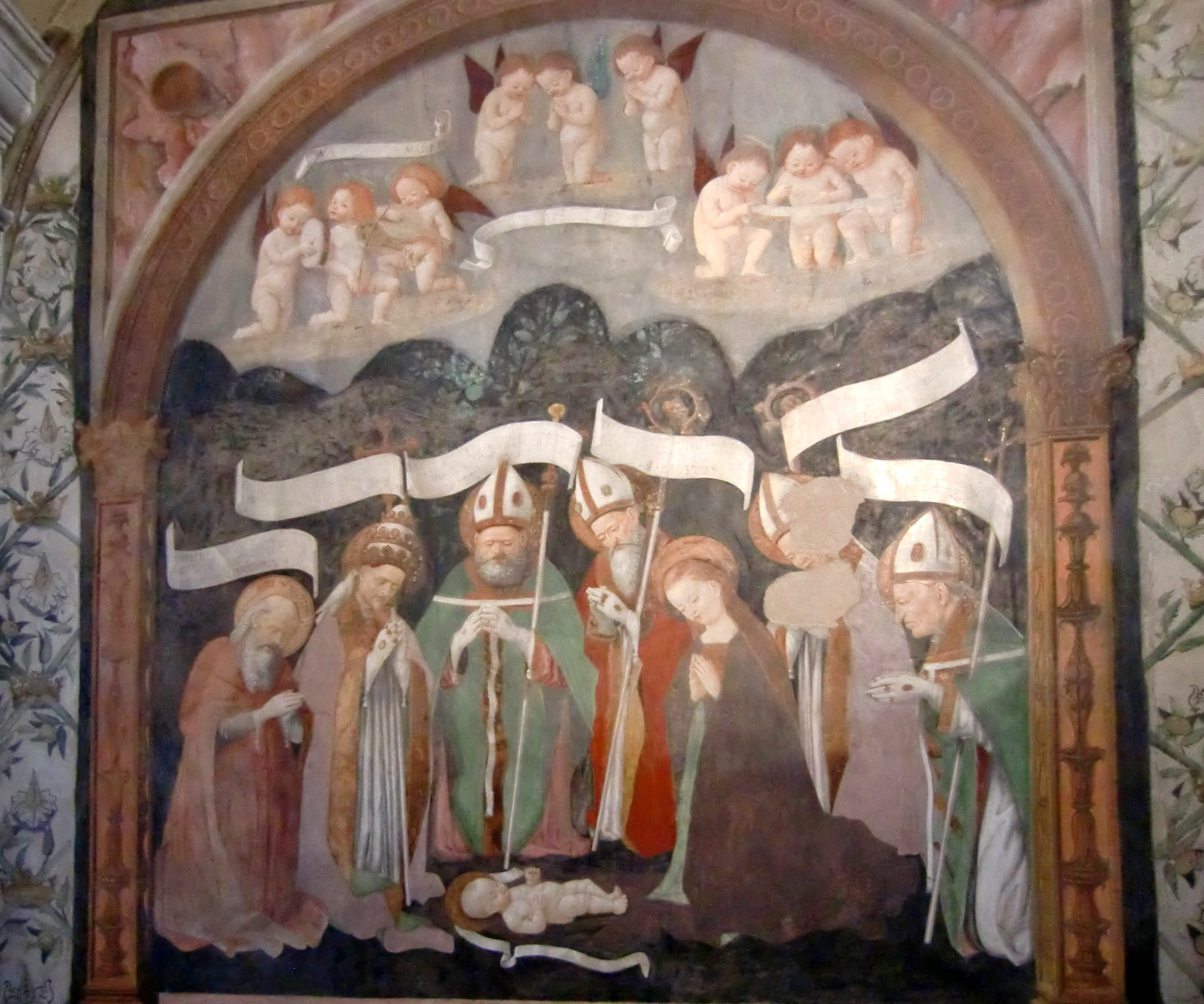
Adoration of the Child

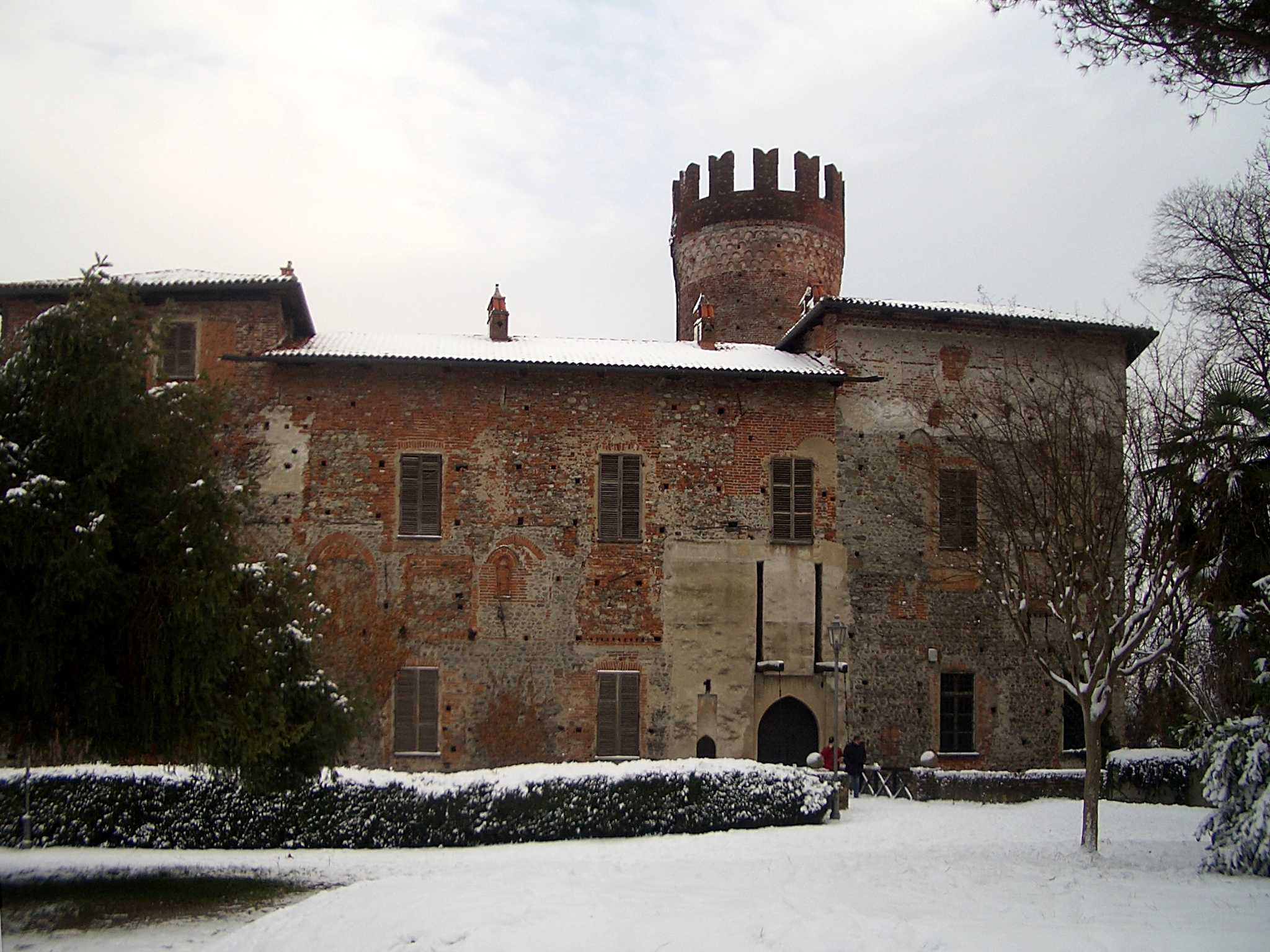
The Castle of Malgrà

- Malgrà Castle (14th century), built by the counts of San Martino who at the time ruled the Canavese.
- San Michele Arcangelo: this church was built in 1759 using a design by Bernardo Antonio Vittone. It has an octagonal dome decorated with stucco.
- Church and convent of San Francesco. It houses a fresco of the Adoration of the Child by Giovanni Martino Spanzotti.

== Twin towns ==
- Sunchales, Argentina, since 2000
