= San Giorgio Canavese =

- Comune
- Comune di San Giorgio Canavese
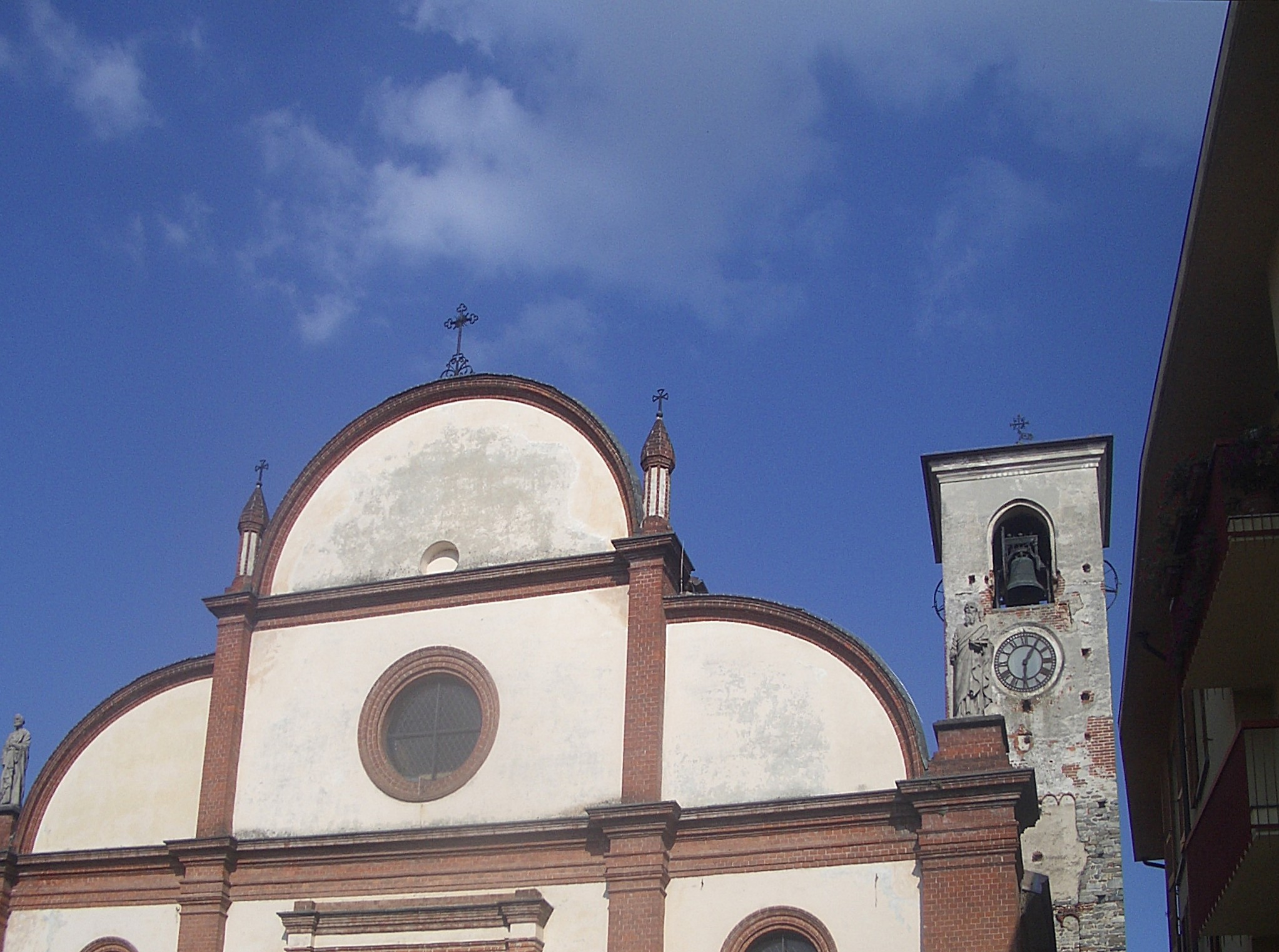
- Parish church.

- Coat of arms

- Location within Italy Location within Piedmont
- Coordinates: 45°20′N 7°48′E
- Country: Italy
- Region: Piedmont
- Metropolitan city: Turin (TO)
- Frazioni: Cortereggio

Government
  - Mayor: Andrea Zanusso

Area
  - Total: 20.36 km^{2} (7.86 sq mi)
- Elevation: 300 m (980 ft)

Population (31 December 2010)
  - Total: 2,721
  - Density: 133.6/km^{2} (346.1/sq mi)
- Demonym: Sangiorgesi
- Time zone: UTC+1 (CET)
  - Summer (DST): UTC+2 (CEST)
- Postal code: 10090
- Dialing code: 0124
- Patron saint: Saint George
- Saint day: 23 April
- Website: Official website

San Giorgio Canavese is a town and comune in the Metropolitan City of Turin in the region of Piedmont, northern Italy.

The main attraction is the castle, once a possession of the Novarese counts of Biandrate.

Near San Giorgio in San Giusto, there was a Pininfarina factory.

The body of Giorgio di Biandrate is interred in the town's church.

== Economy ==
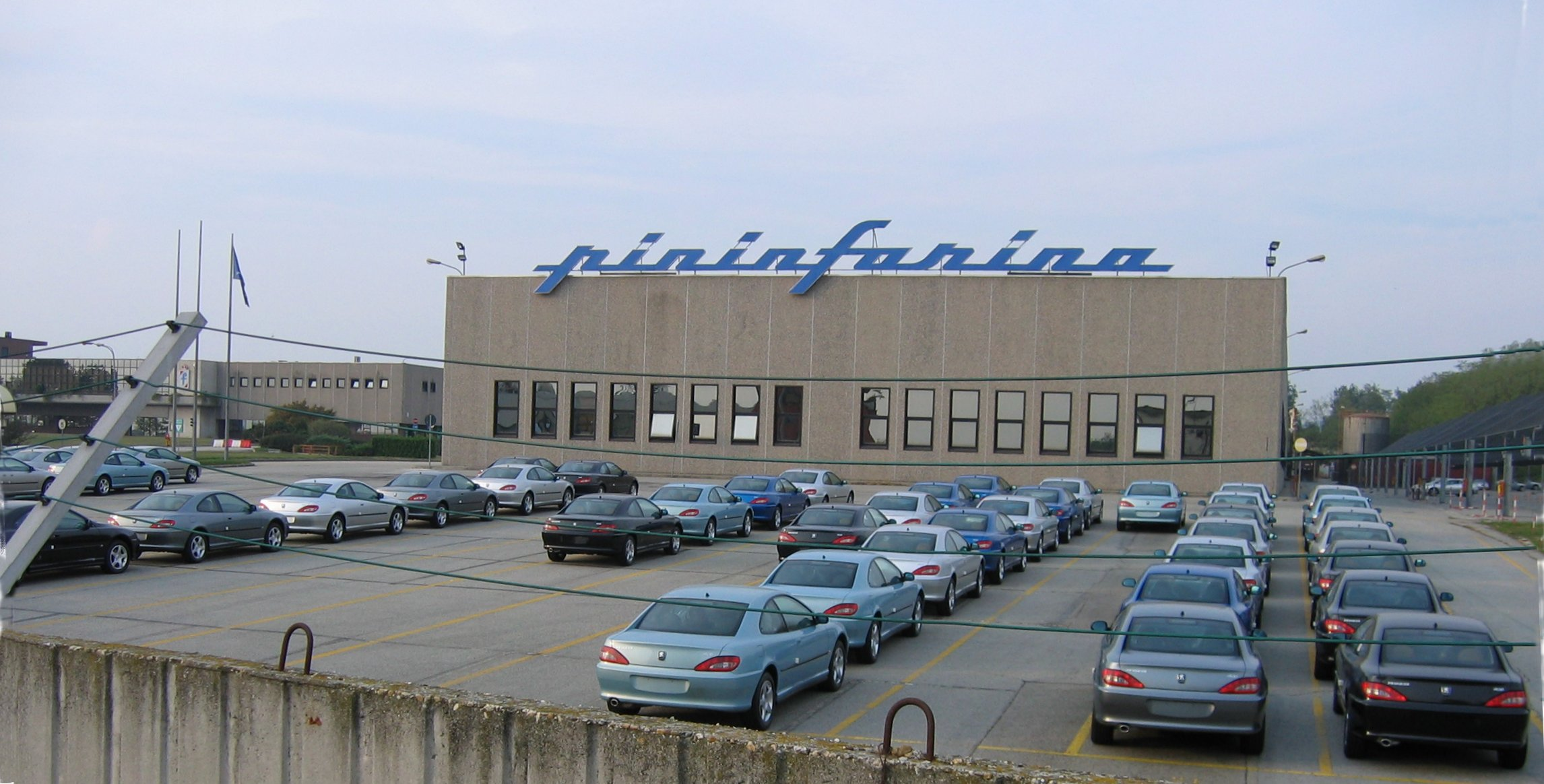
Pininfarina factory at the time it produced Peugeot 406 Coupe.

In San Giorgio Canavese, there was a Pininfarina car factory. The factory has produced several car models, including Ferrari Testarossa and Peugeot 406 Coupé.

== Twin towns ==
San Giorgio Canavese is twinned with:

- Campello sul Clitunno, Perugia, Italy

== Localities ==
- Cortereggio
