= Settimo Torinese–Pont Canavese railway =

Railway line in Italy

Settimo Torinese-Pont Canavese railway

Overview
- Status: Operational
- Locale: Italy
- Termini: Settimo Torinese; Pont Canavese

Service
- Operator(s): TI

History
- Opened: 1865

Technical
- Line length: 74 km (46 mi)
- Track gauge: 1,435 mm (4 ft 8 1/2 in) standard gauge
- Electrification: Electrified at 3000 V DC (Settimo-Rivarolo)

The Settimo Torinese–Pont Canavese railway is a railway linking the comuni (municipalities) of Settimo Torinese and Pont Canavese in the Metropolitan City of Turin in Piedmont, north Italy.

Settimo railway station is an interchange with the Turin-Milan railway, owned by Trenitalia.

== History ==
The Settimo–Pont Canavese railway was, amongst other infrastructures, part of a plan to improve the Piedmontese economy started by Doc. Carlo Demaria, mayor Giuseppe Recrosio and entrepreneurs Giuseppe Chiesa and Fortunato Pistono. Construction started in 1856 by Società Anonima della Strada Ferrata del Canavese. The section to Rivarolo, built to the unusual modified Iberian track gauge of 1,650 mm (5 ft 5 in), was opened in 1865.

Due to the line not being profitable enough, Società Anonima per la Strada Ferrata e le Tranvie del Canavese took over the construction of the railway, rebuilding it from scratch to standard gauge 1,435 mm (4 ft 8 1/2 in). In 1906 the line was completed, successfully contributing to the area's economical development.

On 1 March 2002, the Settimo–Rivarolo section of the line was fully electrified.

The Cuorgnè–Pont Canavese section of the line was closed due to a flood in 2000. It reopened on 7 July 2004.
