= Line SFM1 =

Line 1

Overview
- Service type: Commuter rail
- Status: Operational
- Locale: Metropolitan City of Turin
- First service: 9 December 2012
- Current operator(s): Gruppo Torinese Trasporti

Route
- Termini: Pont Canavese; Chieri
- Stops: 19

Technical
- Track gauge: 1,435 mm (4 ft 8 1/2 in)
- Track owner(s): Turin Metropolitan Railway Service

Line SFM1 is part of the Turin Metropolitan Railway Service. It links Pont Canavese to Chieri, and passes through the city centre.

Service began on 9 December 2012.

Following a 15% increase in ridership since the route was launched in 2012, three four-car Alstom Coradia Meridian EMU trains entered service on route SFM1 in January 2014.
