= List of railway stations in Piedmont =

This is the list of the railway stations in Piedmont owned by:

- Rete Ferroviaria Italiana (RFI), a branch of the Italian state company Ferrovie dello Stato;
- Gruppo Torinese Trasporti (GTT);
- Società Subalpina Imprese Ferroviarie (SSIF), which manages the Italian part of the Domodossola-Locarno railway line;
- Ferrovienord (FNM).

== RFI stations ==
Station	Locality	Province	Category
Acqui Terme	Acqui Terme	Alessandria	Silver
Agliano-Castelnuovo Calcea	Agliano Terme	Asti	Bronze
Airasca	Airasca	Turin	Bronze
Alba	Alba	Cuneo	Silver
Albonese	Albonese	Novara	Bronze
Alessandria	Alessandria	Alessandria	Gold
Alice Belcolle	Alice Bel Colle	Alessandria	Bronze
Alpignano	Alpignano	Turin	Silver
Arona	Arona	Novara	Silver
Arquata Scrivia	Arquata Scrivia	Alessandria	Silver
Asti	Asti	Asti	Gold
Avigliana	Avigliana	Turin	Silver
Bagnasco	Bagnasco	Cuneo	Bronze
Baldichieri-Tigliole	Baldichieri d'Asti	Asti	Bronze
Balzola	Balzola	Alessandria	Bronze
Bandito	Bandito	Cuneo	Bronze
Bardonecchia	Bardonecchia	Turin	Silver
Baveno	Baveno	Verbano-Cusio-Ossola	Bronze
Bazzana	Bazzana	Asti	Bronze
Beaulard	Beaulard	Turin	Bronze
Beinette	Beinette	Cuneo	Bronze
Belgirate	Belgirate	Verbano-Cusio-Ossola	Bronze
Bellinzago	Bellinzago Novarese	Novara	Bronze
Bergamasco	Bergamasco	Alessandria	Bronze
Bianzè	Bianzè	Vercelli	Bronze
Bibiana	Bibiana	Turin	Bronze
Biella San Paolo	Biella	Biella	Silver
Biella-Chiavazza	Biella	Biella	Bronze
Bistagno	Bistagno	Alessandria	Bronze
Bolzano Novarese	Bolzano Novarese	Novara	Bronze
Borgo Lavezzaro	Borgo Lavezzaro	Novara	Bronze
Borgo Revel	Borgo Revel	Turin	Bronze
Borgo San Dalmazzo	Borgo San Dalmazzo	Cuneo	Bronze
Borgo San Martino	Borgo San Martino	Alessandria	Bronze
Borgo Ticino	Borgo Ticino	Novara	Bronze
Borgo Vercelli	Borgo Vercelli	Vercelli	Bronze
Borgofranco	Borgofranco d'Ivrea	Turin	Bronze
Borgomanero	Borgomanero	Novara	Silver
Borgone	Borgone Susa	Turin	Silver
Borgoratto	Borgoratto Alessandrino	Alessandria	Bronze
Borgosesia	Borgosesia	Vercelli	Bronze
Bra	Bra	Cuneo	Silver
Brandizzo	Brandizzo	Turin)	Silver
Bricherasio	Bricherasio	Turin	Bronze
Briona	Briona	Novara	Bronze
Brozolo	Brozolo	Turin)	Bronze
Bruno	Bruno	Asti	Bronze
Bruzolo di Susa	Bruzolo	Turin	Bronze
Buronzo	Buronzo	Vercelli	Bronze
Busca	Busca	Cuneo	Bronze
Bussoleno	Bussoleno	Turin	Silver
Calamandrana	Calamandrana	Asti	Bronze
Caltignaga	Caltignaga	Novara	Bronze
Caluso	Caluso	Turin	Silver
Cambiano-Santena	Cambiano	Turin	Bronze
Candelo	Candelo	Biella	Bronze
Candia Canavese	Candia Canavese	Turin	Bronze
Candiolo	Candiolo	Turin	Silver
Canelli	Canelli	Asti	Bronze
Carentino	Carentino	Alessandria	Bronze
Carmagnola	Carmagnola	Turin	Silver
Carpignano Sesia	Carpignano Sesia	Novara	Bronze
Casale Monferrato	Casale Monferrato	Alessandria	Silver
Casaleggio	Casaleggio	Novara	Bronze
Cassine	Cassine	Alessandria	Bronze
Castagnole delle Lanze	Castagnole delle Lanze	Asti	Silver
Castell'Alfero	Castell'Alfero	Asti	Bronze
Castellazzo-Casalcermelli	Castellazzo Bormida	Alessandria	Bronze
Castelletto Ticino	Castelletto sopra Ticino	Novara	Bronze
Castello d'Annone	Castello di Annone	Asti	Bronze
Castelnuovo Belbo	Castelnuovo Belbo	Asti	Bronze
Castelrosso	Castelrosso	Turin	Bronze
Cavagnolo-Brusasco	Cavagnolo	Turin	Bronze
Cavallermaggiore	Cavallermaggiore	Cuneo	Silver
Centallo	Centallo	Cuneo	Silver
Ceva	Ceva	Cuneo	Silver
Chieri	Chieri	Turin	Bronze
Chiomonte	Chiomonte	Turin	Bronze
Chiusano-Cossombrato	Chiusano d'Asti	Asti	Bronze
Chivasso	Chivasso	Turin	Gold
Cocconato	Cocconato	Asti	Bronze
Collegno	Collegno	Turin	Silver
Comignago	Comignago	Novara	Bronze
Condove-Chiusa San Michele	Condove	Turin	Silver
Cossato	Cossato	Biella	Bronze
Costigliole d'Asti	Costigliole d'Asti	Cuneo	Bronze
Costigliole Saluzzo	Costigliole Saluzzo	Cuneo	Bronze
Crescentino	Crescentino	Vercelli	Silver
Cressa-Fontaneto	Cressa	Novara	Bronze
Cuneo	Cuneo	Cuneo	Gold
Cuneo Gesso	Cuneo	Cuneo	Bronze
Cunico-Scandeluzza	Cunico	Asti	Bronze
Cureggio	Cureggio	Novara	Bronze
Cuzzago	Cuzzago	Verbano-Cusio-Ossola	Bronze
Domodossola	Domodossola	Verbano-Cusio-Ossola	Gold
Dormelletto	Dormelletto	Novara	Bronze
Dormelletto Paese	Dormelletto	Novara	Bronze
Eca Nasagò	Eca Nasagò	Cuneo	Bronze
Fara	Fara Novarese	Novara	Bronze
Felizzano	Felizzano	Alessandria	Bronze
Fontanetto Po	Fontanetto Po	Vercelli	Bronze
Fossano	Fossano	Cuneo	Silver
Frugarolo-Boscomarengo	Frugarolo	Alessandria	Bronze
Garbagna	Garbagna Novarese	Novara	Bronze
Garessio	Garessio	Cuneo	Bronze
Gattinara	Gattinara	Vercelli	Bronze
Ghemme	Ghemme	Novara	Bronze
Ghislarengo	Ghislarengo	Vercelli	Bronze
Giarole	Giarole	Alessandria	Bronze
Gozzano	Gozzano	Novara	Bronze
Gravellona Toce	Gravellona Toce	Verbano-Cusio-Ossola	Bronze
Grignasco	Grignasco	Novara	Bronze
Grugliasco	Grugliasco	Turin	Silver
Incisa Scapaccino	Incisa Scapaccino	Asti	Bronze
Isola d'Asti	Isola d'Asti	Asti	Bronze
Ivrea	Ivrea	Turin	Silver
Lauriano	Lauriano	Turin	Bronze
Lesa	Lesa	Novara	Bronze
Lesegno	Lesegno	Cuneo	Bronze
Limone	Limone Piemonte	Cuneo	Silver
Livorno Ferraris	Livorno Ferraris	Vercelli	Silver
Luserna San Giovanni	Luserna San Giovanni	Turin	Bronze
Madonna del Pilone	Madonna del Pilone	Cuneo	Bronze
Magliano-Crava-Morozzo	Magliano Alpi	Cuneo	Bronze
Manta	Manta	Cuneo	Bronze
Marano Ticino	Marano Ticino	Novara	Bronze
Margarita	Margarita	Cuneo	Bronze
Meana	Meana di Susa	Turin	Bronze
Meina	Meina	Novara	Bronze
Merana	Merana	Alessandria	Bronze
Mercenasco	Mercenasco	Turin	Bronze
Mergozzo	Mergozzo	Verbano-Cusio-Ossola	Bronze
Molare	Molare	Alessandria	Bronze
Mombaldone-Roccaverano	Mombaldone	Alessandria	Bronze
Mombaruzzo	Mombaruzzo	Asti	Bronze
Momo	Momo	Novara	Bronze
Moncalieri	Moncalieri	Turin	Silver
Moncalieri Sangone	Moncalieri	Turin	Bronze
Moncalvo	Moncalvo	Asti	Bronze
Mondovì	Mondovì	Cuneo	Silver
Mongardino	Mongardino	Asti	Bronze
Montanaro	Montanaro	Turin	Silver
Montechiaro d'Asti	Montechiaro d'Asti	Asti	Bronze
Montechiaro-Denice	Montechiaro d'Acqui	Alessandria	Bronze
Montegrosso	Montegrosso d'Asti	Asti	Bronze
Monteu da Po	Monteu da Po	Turin	Bronze
Monticello d'Alba	Monticello d'Alba	Cuneo	Bronze
Montiglio-Murisengo	Montiglio Monferrato	Asti	Bronze
Morano sul Po	Morano sul Po	Alessandria	Bronze
Motta di Costigliole	Motta di Costigliole	Asti	Bronze
Mussotto	Mussotto	Cuneo	Bronze
Neive	Neive	Cuneo	Bronze
Nibbia	Nibbia	Novara	Bronze
Nichelino	Nichelino	Turin	Bronze
Nizza Monferrato	Nizza Monferrato	Asti	Silver
None	None	Turin	Silver
Novara	Novara	Novara	Gold
Novi Ligure	Novi Ligure	Alessandria	Silver
Nucetto	Nucetto	Cuneo	Bronze
Oleggio	Oleggio	Novara	Silver
Omegna	Omegna	Verbano-Cusio-Ossola	Silver
Omegna-Crusinallo	Omegna	Verbano-Cusio-Ossola	Bronze
Ormea	Ormea	Cuneo	Bronze
Ornavasso	Ornavasso	Verbano-Cusio-Ossola	Bronze
Orta-Miasino	Orta San Giulio	Novara	Bronze
Oulx-Cesana-Claviere-Sestriere	Oulx	Turin	Silver
Ovada	Ovada	Alessandria	Silver
Ovada Nord	Ovada	Alessandria	Bronze
Oviglio	Oviglio	Alessandria	Bronze
Ozzano Monferrato	Ozzano Monferrato	Alessandria	Bronze
Palazzolo Vercellese	Palazzolo Vercellese	Vercelli	Bronze
Pallanzeno	Pallanzeno	Verbano-Cusio-Ossola	Bronze
Penango	Penango	Asti	Bronze
Pessione	Pessione	Turin	Bronze
Pettenasco	Pettenasco	Novara	Bronze
Pianfei	Pianfei	Cuneo	Bronze
Piedimulera	Piedimulera	Verbano-Cusio-Ossola	Bronze
Pieve Vergonte	Pieve Vergonte	Verbano-Cusio-Ossola	Bronze
Pievetta	Pievetta	Cuneo	Bronze
Pinerolo	Pinerolo	Turin	Silver
Pinerolo Olimpica	Pinerolo	Turin	Silver
Piscina di Pinerolo	Piscina	Turin	Silver
Pocapaglia	Pocapaglia	Cuneo	Bronze
Pombia	Pombia	Novara	Bronze
Pontecurone	Pontecurone	Alessandria	Bronze
Ponti	Ponti	Alessandria	Bronze
Portacomaro	Portacomaro	Asti	Bronze
Porto Varallo Pombia	Varallo Pombia	Novara	Bronze
Pozzolo Formigaro	Pozzolo Formigaro	Alessandria	Bronze
Prasco-Cremolino	Prasco	Alessandria	Bronze
Prato Sesia	Prato Sesia	Novara	Bronze
Predosa	Predosa	Alessandria	Bronze
Premosello-Chiovenda	Premosello-Chiovenda	Verbano-Cusio-Ossola	Bronze
Priola	Priola	Cuneo	Bronze
Quarona	Quarona	Vercelli	Bronze
Racconigi	Racconigi	Cuneo	Silver
Rigola Stadio	Venaria Reale	Turin	
Rigoroso	Rigoroso	Alessandria	Bronze
Rivalta Scrivia	Rivalta Scrivia	Alessandria	Bronze
Robilante	Robilante	Cuneo	Bronze
Roccagrimalda	Rocca Grimalda	Alessandria	Bronze
Roccavione	Roccavione	Cuneo	Bronze
Rocchetta Tanaro-Cerro	Rocchetta Tanaro	Asti	Bronze
Rodallo	Rodallo	Turin	Bronze
Romagnano Sesia	Romagnano Sesia	Novara	Silver
Rosta	Rosta	Turin	Silver
Rovasenda	Rovasenda	Vercelli	Bronze
Rovasenda Alta	Rovasenda	Vercelli	Bronze
Sant'Ambrogio	Sant'Ambrogio di Torino	Turin	Silver
Sant'Anna-Robella	Robella	Asti	Bronze
Sant'Antonino di Saluggia	Sant'Antonino di Saluggia	Vercelli	Bronze
Sant'Antonino-Vaie	Sant'Antonino di Susa	Turin	Silver
San Damiano d'Asti	San Damiano d'Asti	Asti	Bronze
San Germano Vercellese	San Germano Vercellese	Vercelli	Bronze
San Giacomo	San Giacomo	Alessandria	Bronze
San Giorgio Casale	San Giorgio Monferrato	Alessandria	Bronze
San Giuliano Piemonte	San Giuliano Nuovo	Alessandria	Bronze
San Paolo Solbrito	San Paolo Solbrito	Asti	Bronze
San Sebastiano Po	San Sebastiano da Po	Turin	Bronze
Santo Stefano Belbo	Santo Stefano Belbo	Cuneo	Bronze
Santa Vittoria	Santa Vittoria d'Alba	Cuneo	Bronze
Salbertrand	Salbertrand	Turin	Bronze
Sale Langhe	Sale delle Langhe	Cuneo	Bronze
Saliceto	Saliceto	Cuneo	Bronze
Saluggia	Saluggia	Vercelli	Bronze
Salussola	Salussola	Biella	Bronze
Saluzzo	Saluzzo	Cuneo	Silver
Sandigliano	Sandigliano	Biella	Bronze
Sanfrè	Sanfrè	Cuneo	Bronze
Santhià	Santhià	Vercelli	Silver
Savigliano	Savigliano	Cuneo	Silver
Serralunga-Cereseto	Serralunga di Crea	Alessandria	Bronze
Serravalle d'Asti	Serravalle d'Asti	Asti	Bronze
Serravalle Scrivia	Serravalle Scrivia	Alessandria	Silver
Settime-Cinaglio-Mombarone	Settime	Asti	Bronze
Settimo	Settimo Torinese	Turin	Silver
Sillavengo	Sillavengo	Novara	Bronze
Sizzano	Sizzano	Novara	Bronze
Solero	Solerno	Alessandria	Bronze
Sommariva del Bosco	Sommariva del Bosco	Cuneo	Silver
Spigno	Spigno Monferrato	Alessandria	Bronze
Spinetta	Spinetta Marengo	Alessandria	Bronze
Strambino	Strambino	Turin	Silver
Stresa	Stresa	Verbano-Cusio-Ossola	Silver
Strevi	Strevi	Alessandria	Bronze
Suno	Suno	Novara	Bronze
Susa	Susa	Turin	Silver
Terzo-Montabone	Terzo	Alessandria	Bronze
Tonco-Alfiano	Tonco	Asti	Bronze
Torino Aeroporto	Caselle Torinese	Turin	
Torino Lingotto	Turin	Turin	Gold
Torino Porta Nuova	Turin	Turin	Platinum
Torino Porta Susa	Turin	Turin	Gold
Torino Stura	Turin	Turin	Bronze
Torrazza Piemonte	Torrazza Piemonte	Turin	Bronze
Torre Pellice	Torre Pellice	Turin	Bronze
Tortona	Tortona	Alessandria	Silver
Trappa	Trappa	Cuneo	Bronze
Trecate	Trecate	Novara	Silver
Trinità-Bene Vagienna	Trinità	Cuneo	Bronze
Trino Vercellese	Trino	Vercelli	Silver
Trofarello	Trofarello	Turin	Silver
Tronzano	Tronzano	Vercelli	Bronze
Valenza	Valenza	Alessandria	Silver
Valmadonna	Valmadonna	Alessandria	Bronze
Vaprio d'Agogna	Vaprio d'Agogna	Novara	Bronze
Varallo Pombia	Varallo Pombia	Novara	Bronze
Varallo Sesia	Varallo	Vercelli	Bronze
Verbania-Pallanza	Verbania	Verbano-Cusio-Ossola	Silver
Vercelli	Vercelli	Vercelli	Gold
Vergnasco	Vergnasco	Biella	Bronze
Vernante	Vernante	Cuneo	Bronze
Verolengo	Verolengo	Turin	Bronze
Verzuolo	Verzuolo	Cuneo	Bronze
Vespolate	Vespolate	Novara	Bronze
Vicoforte-San Michele	Vicoforte	Cuneo	Bronze
Vigliano d'Asti	Vigliano d'Asti	Asti	Bronze
Vigliano-Candelo	Vigliano Biellese	Biella	Bronze
Vignale	Novara	Novara	Bronze
Villadossola	Villadossola	Verbano-Cusio-Ossola	Bronze
Villafranca-Cantarana	Villafranca d'Asti	Asti	Silver
Villanova d'Asti	Villanova d'Asti	Asti	Silver
Villastellone	Villastellone	Turin	Silver
Visone	Visone	Alessandria	Bronze
Vogogna Ossola	Vogogna	Verbano-Cusio-Ossola	Bronze

== GTT stations ==
Station	Locality	Province
Balangero	Balangero	Turin
Borgaro	Borgaro Torinese	Turin
Bosconero	Bosconero	Turin
Campore	Cuorgnè	Turin
Caselle	Caselle Torinese	Turin
Ceres	Ceres	Turin
Cirié	Cirié	Turin
Cuorgnè	Cuorgnè	Turin
Favria	Favria	Turin
Feletto	Feletto	Turin
Funghera	Germagnano	Turin
Germagnano	Germagnano	Turin
Lanzo	Lanzo Torinese	Turin
Losa	Pessinetto	Turin
Madonna di Campagna	Turin	Turin
Mathi	Mathi	Turin
Mezzenile	Mezzenile	Turin
Nole	Nole	Turin
Pessinetto	Pessinetto	Turin
Pont Canavese	Pont Canavese	Turin
Rivarolo Canavese	Rivarolo Canavese	Turin
Salassa	Salassa	Turin
San Benigno Canavese	San Benigno Canavese	Turin
San Maurizio	San Maurizio Canavese	Turin
Torino Dora	Turin	Turin
Traves	Traves	Turin
Valperga	Valperga	Turin
Venaria	Venaria Reale	Turin
Villanova-Grosso	Villanova Canavese	Turin
Volpiano	Volpiano	Turin

== SSIF stations ==
Station	Locality	Province
Buttogno	Santa Maria Maggiore	Verbano-Cusio-Ossola
Coimo	Druogno	Verbano-Cusio-Ossola
Creggio	Trontano	Verbano-Cusio-Ossola
Domodossola (SSIF)	Domodossola	Verbano-Cusio-Ossola
Druogno	Druogno	Verbano-Cusio-Ossola
Folsogno-Dissimo	Re	Verbano-Cusio-Ossola
Gagnone-Orcesco	Druogno	Verbano-Cusio-Ossola
Isella-Olgia	Re	Verbano-Cusio-Ossola
Malesco	Malesco	Verbano-Cusio-Ossola
Marone	Trontano	Verbano-Cusio-Ossola
Masera	Masera	Verbano-Cusio-Ossola
Prestinone	Craveggia	Verbano-Cusio-Ossola
Re	Re	Verbano-Cusio-Ossola
Ribellasca	Re	Verbano-Cusio-Ossola
Santa Maria Maggiore	Santa Maria Maggiore	Verbano-Cusio-Ossola
Trontano	Trontano	Verbano-Cusio-Ossola
Verigo	Trontano	Verbano-Cusio-Ossola
Villette	Villette	Verbano-Cusio-Ossola
Zornasco	Malesco	Verbano-Cusio-Ossola

== FNM stations ==
Station	Locality	Province
Galliate	Galliate	Novara
Novara Nord	Novara	Novara
Ponte Ticino	Galliate	Novara

== See also ==
- Railway stations in Italy
- Ferrovie dello Stato
- Rail transport in Italy
- High-speed rail in Italy
- Transport in Italy
