= Romagnano Sesia railway station =

Railway station in Piedmont, Italy

Romagnano Sesia
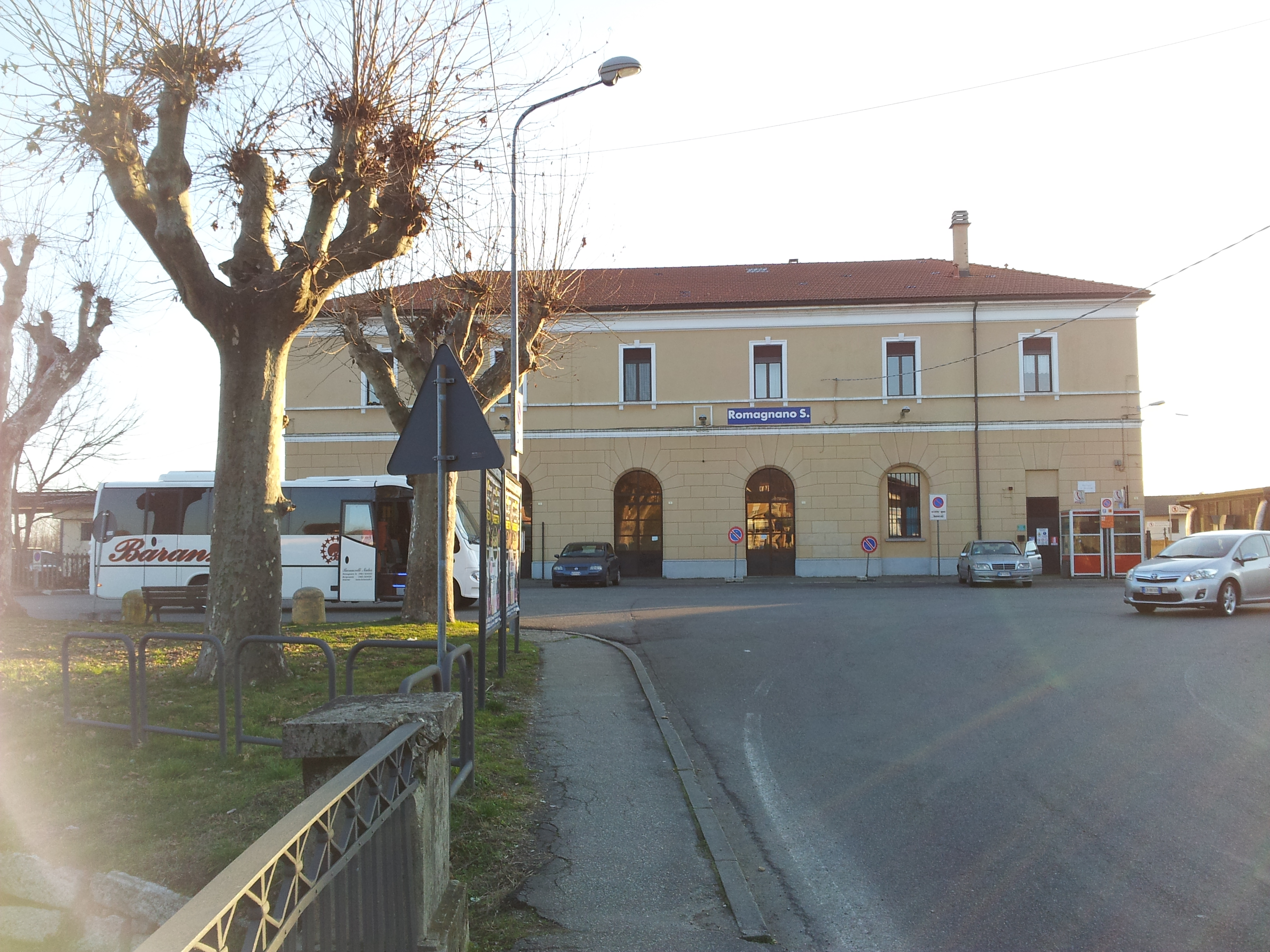
- The passenger building.

General information
- Location: Piazza Brodolini, 2; 28078 Romagnano Sesia NO; Romagnano Sesia, Novara, Piedmont; Italy
- Coordinates: 45°37′48″N 08°23′05″E
- Operator: Rete Ferroviaria Italiana
- Lines: Novara–Varallo; Santhià–Arona
- Distance: 29.004 km (18.022 mi) from Novara; 34.393 km (21.371 mi) from Santhià
- Platforms: 3
- Tracks: 6
- Train operators: Trenitalia
- Connections: Suburban buses

Construction
- Platform levels: 55 cm

Other information
- Classification: Bronze

History
- Opened: 22 February 1883; 143 years ago
Location
- Location within Piedmont Location within Northern Italy Location within Italy

Romagnano Sesia railway station (Italian: Stazione di Romagnano Sesia) is the train station serving the comune of Romagnano Sesia, in the Piedmont region of northwestern Italy. It is the junction of the Novara–Varallo and Santhià–Arona (suspended from 17 June 2012).

The station is currently managed by Rete Ferroviaria Italiana (RFI), while the passenger building is managed by the comune. The station is served only by historic trains, in the service of tourism, in planned dates. Regular passenger services were suspended from 15 September 2014, by decision of the Piedmont Region. Train services are operated by Fondazione FS and Trenitalia. Both companies are subsidiaries of Ferrovie dello Stato (FS), Italy's state-owned rail company.

== History ==
The station was opened on 22 February 1883, upon the inauguration the first part of the Novara–Varallo railway, from Vignale to Romagnano Sesia.

== Features ==
Six tracks, five of which are equipped with platforms, pass through the station.

== Train services ==
The station is served by the following services:

- Historic train (Treno storico) Novara - Varallo Sesia

== See also ==
- History of rail transport in Italy
- List of railway stations in Piedmont
- Rail transport in Italy
- Railway stations in Italy
