= Salussola railway station =

Railway station in Italy

Salussola
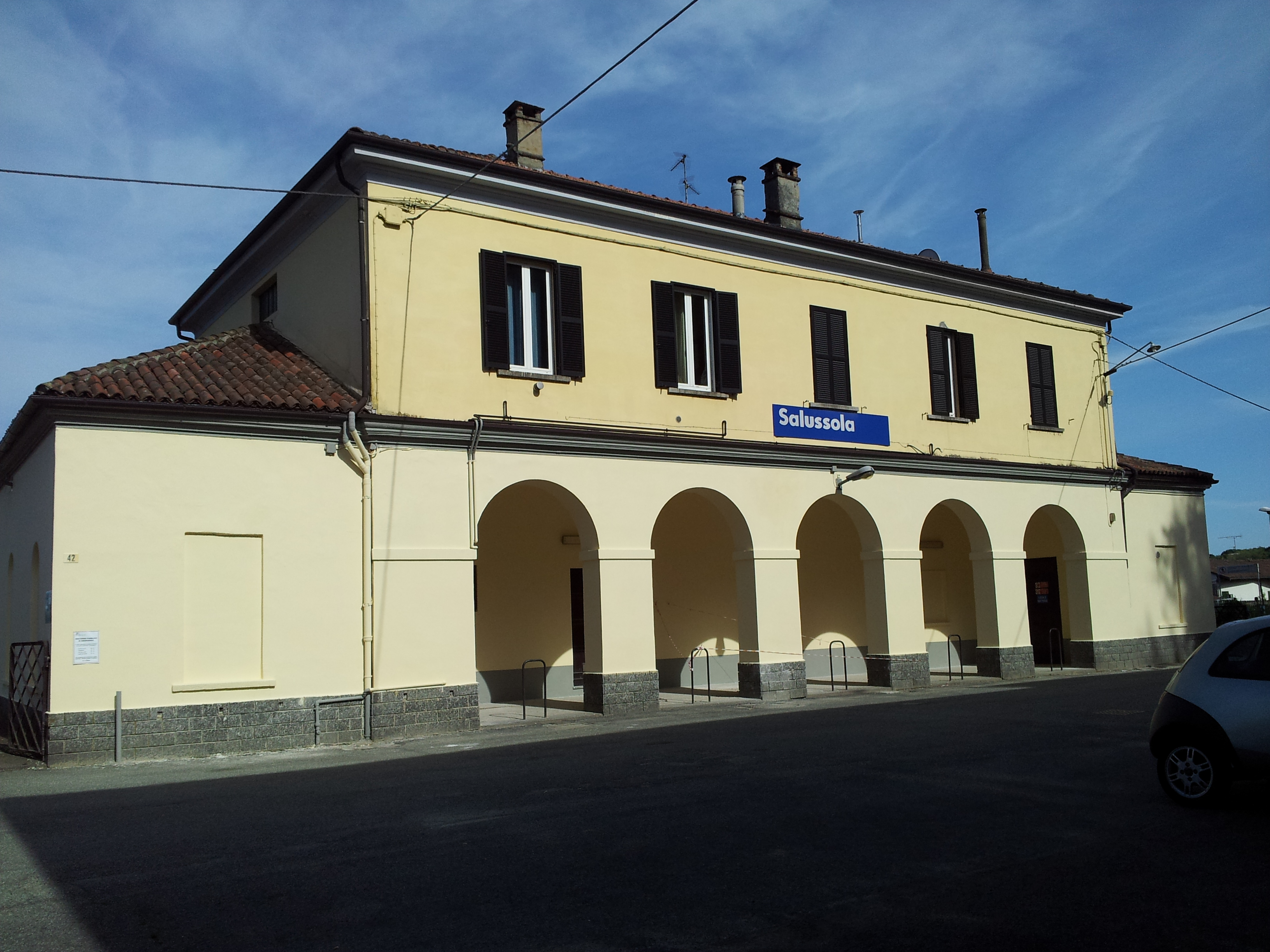
- The passenger building.

General information
- Location: Via Stazione, 42; 13885 Salussola BI; Salussola, Biella, Piedmont; Italy
- Coordinates: 45°26′42″N 08°06′53″E
- Operator: Rete Ferroviaria Italiana
- Line: Santhià–Biella
- Distance: 11.166 km (6.938 mi) from Santhià
- Platforms: 2
- Train operators: Trenitalia

Other information
- Classification: Bronze

History
- Opened: 8 September 1856; 169 years ago
Location
- Location within Piedmont Location within Northern Italy Location within Italy

Salussola railway station (Italian: Stazione di Salussola) is the train station serving the comune of Salussola, in the Piedmont region, northwestern Italy. It is the junction of the Santhià–Biella railway.

The station is currently managed by Rete Ferroviaria Italiana (RFI). Train services are operated by Trenitalia. Each of these companies is a subsidiary of Ferrovie dello Stato (FS), Italy's state-owned rail company.

== History ==
The station was opened on 8 September 1856, upon the inauguration of the Santhià–Biella railway.

From 10 July 1951, with the end of the concession to the "Società Strade Ferrate di Biella (SFB)" company, the management of the railway line passed to the state and the exercise of the stations was assumed by Ferrovie dello Stato.

In the year 2000, the plant management passed to Rete Ferroviaria Italiana, which classified the station under the category "Bronze".

== Features ==
The station's two tracks are both equipped with platforms.

== Train services ==
The station is served by the following service(s):

- Regional services (Treno regionale) Santhià - Biella San Paolo

== See also ==
- History of rail transport in Italy
- List of railway stations in Piedmont
- Rail transport in Italy
- Railway stations in Italy
