= Gattinara railway station =

Railway station in Italy

Gattinara
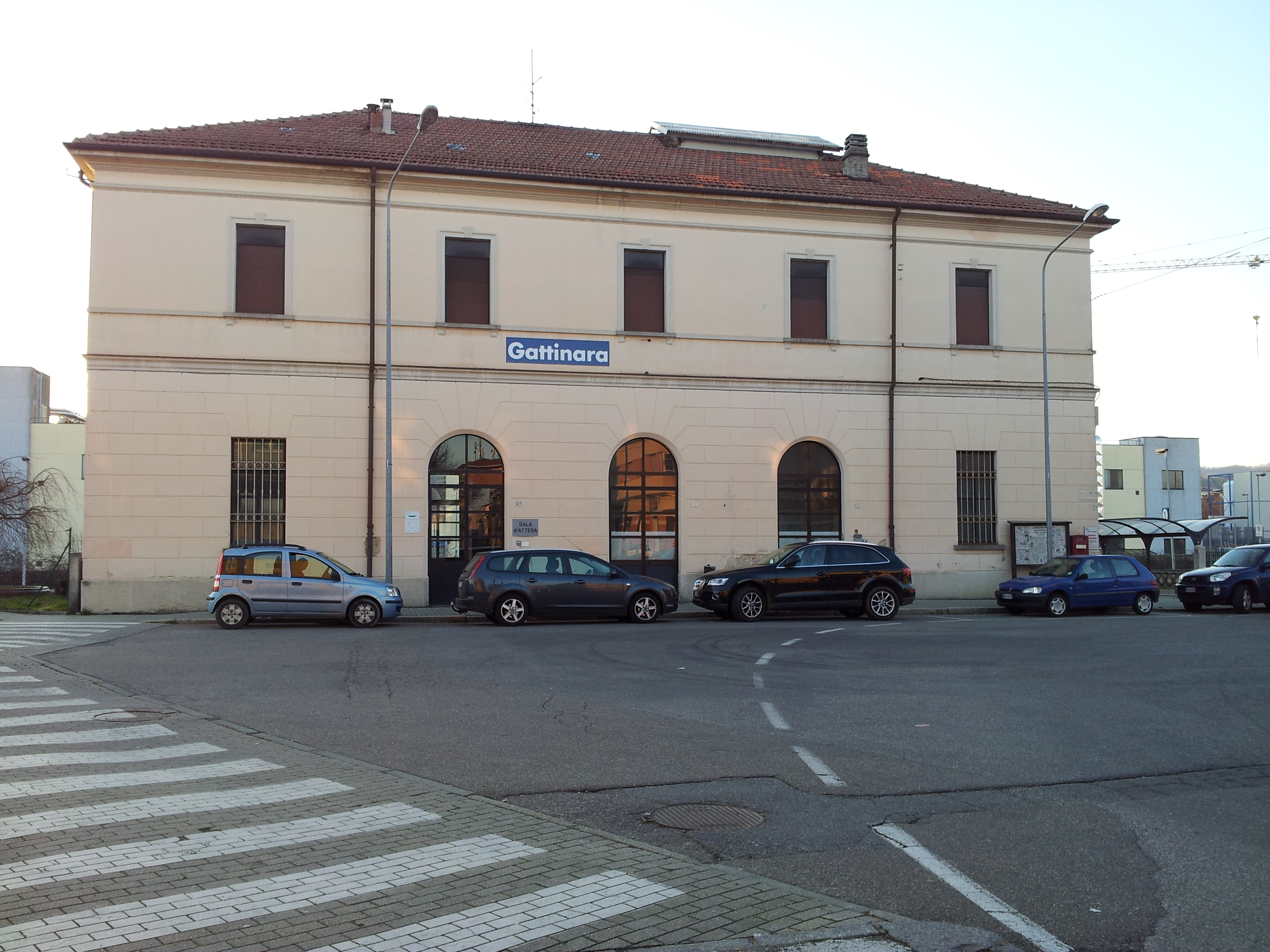
- Side station parking.

General information
- Location: Viale Roma, 15; 13045 Gattinara VC; Gattinara, Vercelli, Piedmont; Italy
- Coordinates: 45°36′41″N 08°21′52″E
- Operator: Rete Ferroviaria Italiana
- Line: Santhià–Arona
- Distance: 31.230 km (19.405 mi) from Santhià
- Platforms: 2
- Train operators: Trenitalia
- Connections: Suburban buses

Other information
- Classification: Bronze

History
- Opened: 16 January 1905; 121 years ago
Location
- Location within Piedmont Location within Northern Italy Location within Italy

Gattinara railway station (Italian: Stazione di Gattinara) is the train station serving the comune of Gattinara, in the Piedmont region of northwestern Italy. It is the junction of the Santhià–Arona.

The station has remained without traffic since 17 June 2012, because of the suspension of service on the railway, following a decision of the Piedmont Region. The station was managed by Rete Ferroviaria Italiana (RFI). Train services were operated by Trenitalia. Each of these companies is a subsidiary of Ferrovie dello Stato (FS), Italy's state-owned rail company.

== History ==
The station was opened on 16 January 1905, upon the inauguration the first part of the Santhià–Arona railway, from Santhià to Borgomanero.

== Features ==
Two tracks of which are equipped with platforms.

== See also ==
- History of rail transport in Italy
- List of railway stations in Piedmont
- Rail transport in Italy
- Railway stations in Italy
