= Garessio railway station =

Railway station in Italy

Garessio
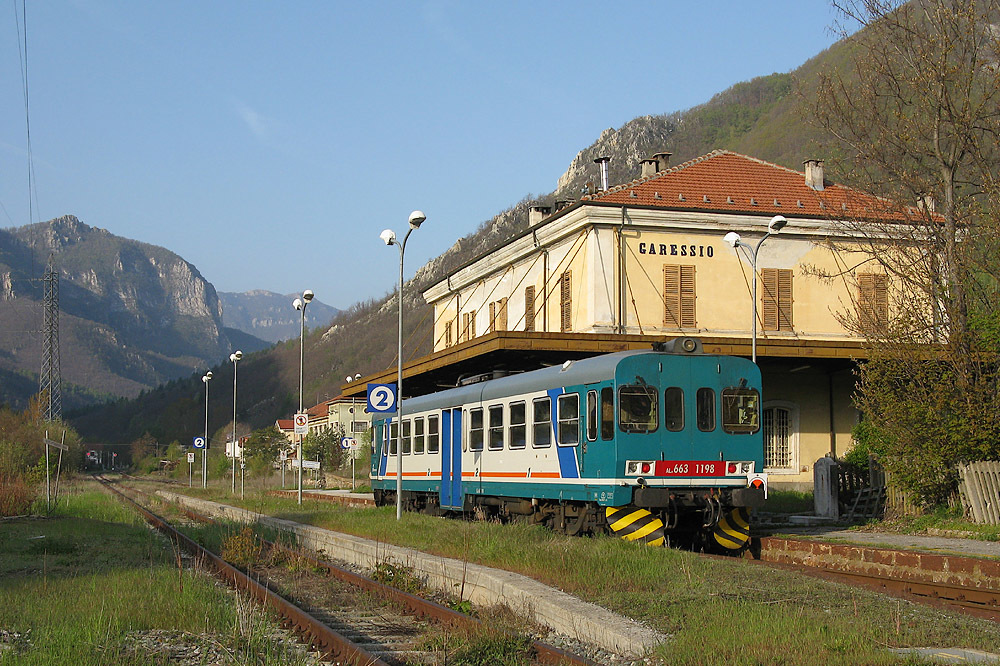
- Side station railway

General information
- Location: Viale Marro, 18; 12075 Garessio CN; Garessio, Cuneo, Piedmont; Italy
- Coordinates: 44°12′02″N 08°00′59″E
- Operator: Rete Ferroviaria Italiana
- Line: Ceva–Ormea
- Distance: 24.311 km (15.106 mi) from Ceva
- Platforms: 2
- Tracks: 2
- Train operators: Trenitalia
- Connections: Suburban buses

Other information
- Classification: Bronze

History
- Opened: 15 July 1890; 136 years ago
Location
- Location within Piedmont Location within Northern Italy Location within Italy

Garessio railway station (Italian: Stazione di Garessio) is the train station serving the comune of Garessio, in the Piedmont region of northwestern Italy. It is the junction of the Ceva–Ormea.

The station is managed by Rete Ferroviaria Italiana (RFI) and the passenger building by the comune. The station is served only by historic trains, in the service of tourism, on planned dates. The regular service has been suspended from 12 June 2012, by decision of the Piedmont Region. Train services are operated by Fondazione FS and Trenitalia. Each of these companies is a subsidiary of Ferrovie dello Stato (FS), Italy's state-owned rail company.

== History ==
The station was opened on 15 July 1890, upon the inauguration of the track from Priola to Garessio of the Ceva–Ormea railway.

== Features ==
Two tracks equipped with platform.

== Train services ==
The station is served by the following services:

- Historic train (Treno storico) Turin - Ceva - Ormea

== See also ==
- History of rail transport in Italy
- List of railway stations in Piedmont
- Rail transport in Italy
- Railway stations in Italy
