= Ormea railway station =

Railway station in Italy

Ormea
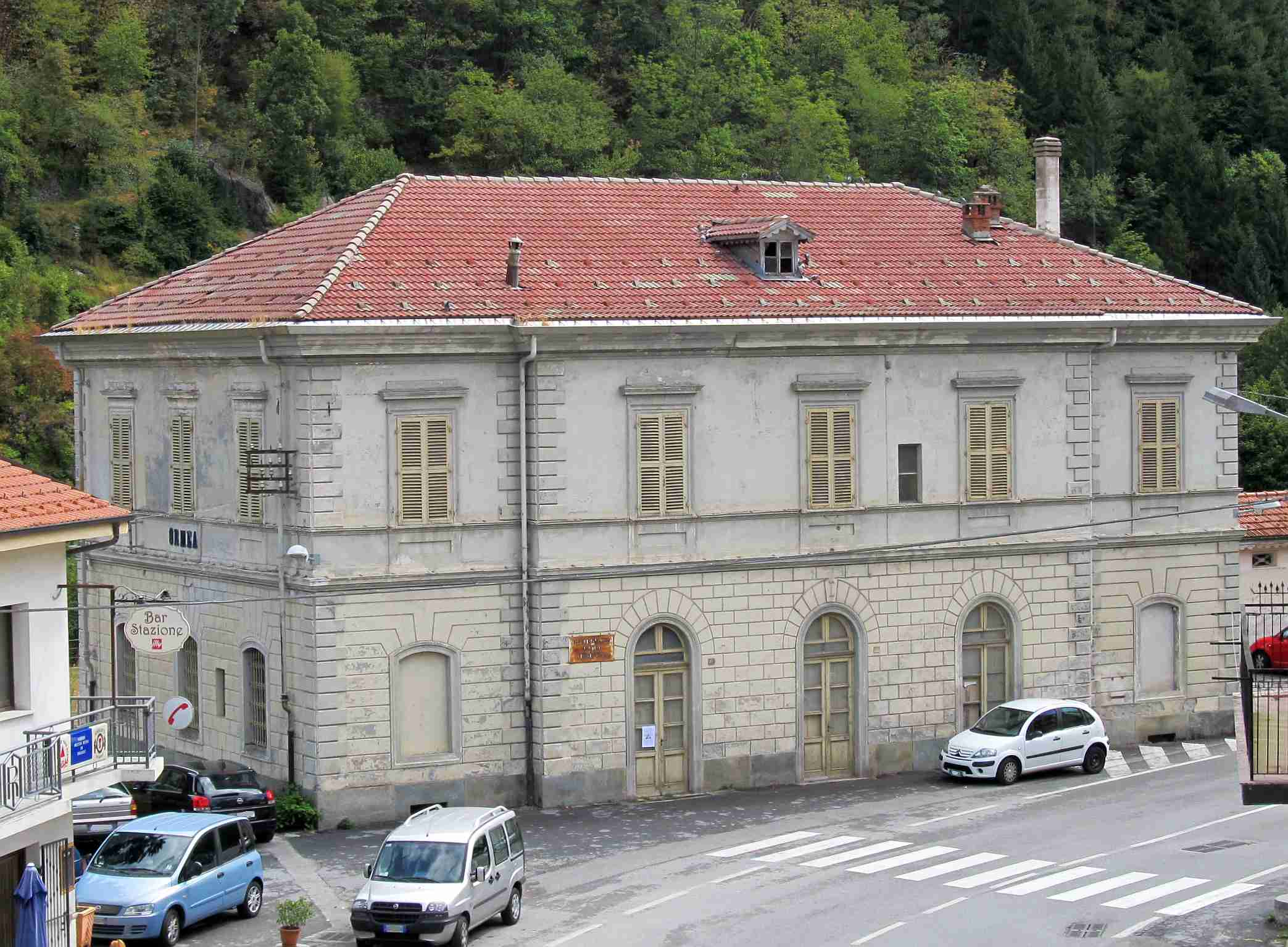
- The passenger building.

General information
- Location: Via stazione 12078 Ormea CN; Ormea, Cuneo, Piedmont; Italy
- Coordinates: 44°09′00″N 07°54′51″E
- Operator: Rete Ferroviaria Italiana
- Line: Ceva–Ormea
- Distance: 35.432 km (22.016 mi) from Ceva
- Platforms: 1
- Train operators: Trenitalia
- Connections: Suburban buses

Other information
- Classification: Bronze

History
- Opened: 15 February 1893; 133 years ago
Location
- Location within Piedmont Location within Northern Italy Location within Italy

Ormea railway station (Italian: Stazione di Ormea) is the train station serving the comune of Ormea, in the Piedmont region of northwestern Italy. It is the junction terminus of the Ceva–Ormea.

The station is currently managed by Rete Ferroviaria Italiana (RFI), while the passenger building is managed by the comune. The station is served only by historic trains, in the service of tourism, on planned dates. The ordinary service has been suspended since 12 June 2012 following a decision of the Piedmont Region. Train services are operated by Fondazione FS Italiane and Trenitalia. Both companies are subsidiaries of Ferrovie dello Stato (FS), Italy's state-owned rail company.

== History ==
The station was opened on 15 February 1893, upon the inauguration the tract from Trappa to Ormea of the Ceva–Ormea railway.

== Features ==
Two tracks, one of which is equipped with platform.

== Train services ==
The station is served by the following services:

- Historic train (Treno storico) Turin - Ceva - Ormea

== See also ==
- History of rail transport in Italy
- List of railway stations in Piedmont
- Rail transport in Italy
- Railway stations in Italy
