= Candelo railway station =

Railway station in Italy

Candelo
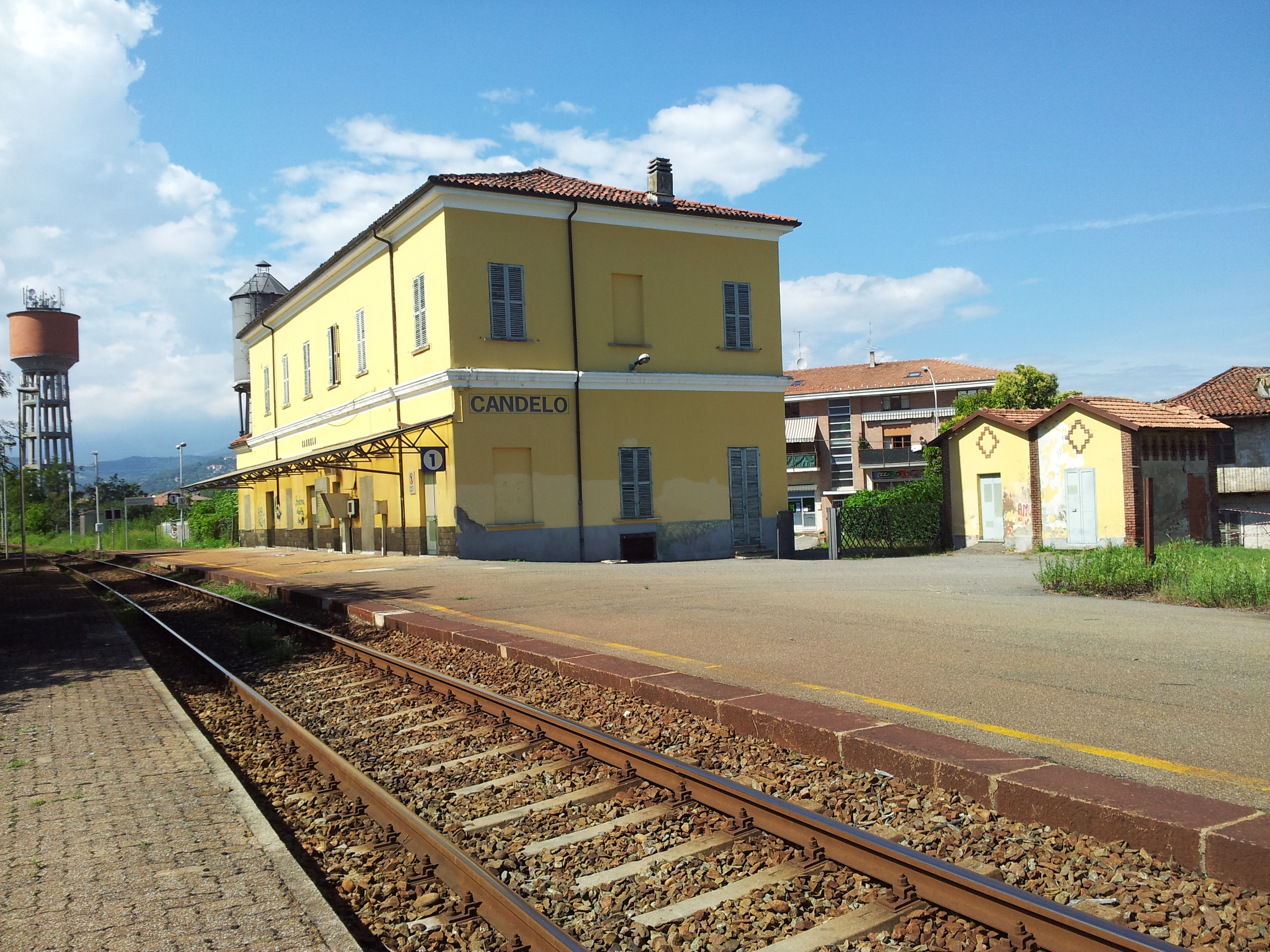

General information
- Location: Via Marconi, 79; 13878 Candelo; Candelo, Biella, Piedmont; Italy
- Coordinates: 45°32′50″N 08°06′01″E
- Operator: Rete Ferroviaria Italiana
- Line: Santhià–Biella railway
- Distance: 23.789 km (14.782 mi) from Santhià
- Platforms: 1
- Train operators: Trenitalia

Other information
- Classification: Bronze

History
- Opened: 8 September 1856; 169 years ago
Location
- Location within Piedmont Location within Northern Italy Location within Italy

Candelo railway station (Italian: Stazione di Candelo) is a train station serving the comune of Candelo, in the Piedmont region of northwestern Italy. The train services are operated by Trenitalia at this station located on the Santhià–Biella railway.

The station is currently managed by Rete Ferroviaria Italiana (RFI), a subsidiary of Ferrovie dello Stato (FS), Italy's state-owned rail company.

== History ==
The station was opened on 8 September 1856, upon the inauguration of the Santhià–Biella railway. It was originally equipped with three tracks.

From 10 July 1951, with the end of the concession to the "Società Strade Ferrate di Biella (SFB)" company, the management of the railway line passed to the state and the exercise of the stations was assumed by Ferrovie dello Stato.

From 2006 the station was declassified to a railway stop, and remains in operation, but with only one track and one platform.

In the year 2000, the plant management passed to Rete Ferroviaria Italiana, which is classified in the category "Bronze".

== Train services ==
The station is served by the following service(s):

- Regional services (Treno regionale) Santhià - Biella San Paolo only on weekends and holidays

== See also ==
- History of rail transport in Italy
- List of railway stations in Piedmont
- Rail transport in Italy
- Railway stations in Italy
