= Casaleggio railway station =

Railway station in Casaleggio Novara, Italy

Casaleggio
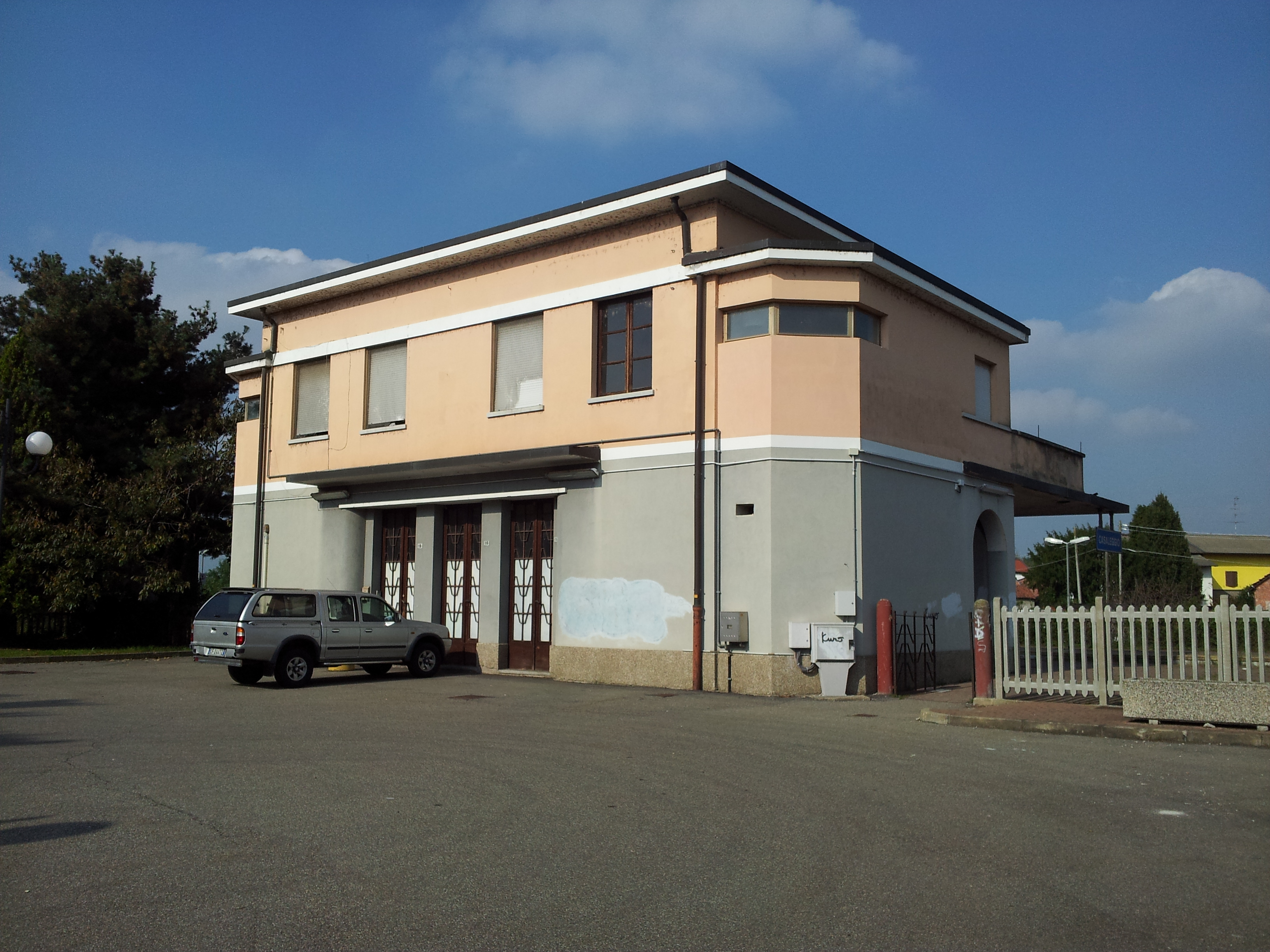
- The passenger building.

General information
- Location: Via Roma, 18; 28060 Casaleggio NO; Casaleggio, Novara, Piedmont; Italy
- Coordinates: 45°29′28″N 08°29′25″E
- Operator: Rete Ferroviaria Italiana
- Line: Biella–Novara
- Distance: 12.083 km (7.508 mi) from Novara
- Platforms: 2
- Tracks: 2
- Train operators: Trenitalia
- Connections: Suburban buses

Other information
- Classification: Bronze

History
- Opened: 18 May 1939; 87 years ago
Location
- Location within Piedmont Location within Northern Italy Location within Italy

Casaleggio railway station (Italian: Stazione di Casaleggio) is the train station serving the comune of Casaleggio, in the Piedmont region of northwestern Italy. It serves as the junction of the Biella–Novara.

The station is currently managed by Rete Ferroviaria Italiana (RFI). However, the passenger building is private residence. Train services are operated by Trenitalia. Each of these companies is a subsidiary of Ferrovie dello Stato (FS), Italy's state-owned rail company.

== History ==
The station was opened on 18 May 1939 along with the rest of the line, but did not become operational until 20 July 1940 because of the need to complete several systems and a lack of rolling stock.

From 21 January 1961, in advance to the end of the concession to the "Società Ferrovia Biella-Novara (SFBN)" company, the management of the railway line passed to the state and the exercise of the stations was assumed by Ferrovie dello Stato.

In the year 2000, the plant management passed to Rete Ferroviaria Italiana, which is classified in the category "Bronze".

== Features ==
Two tracks of which are equipped with platforms.

== Train services ==
The station is served by the following service(s):

- Regional services (Treno regionale) Biella San Paolo - Novara

== See also ==
- History of rail transport in Italy
- List of railway stations in Piedmont
- Rail transport in Italy
- Railway stations in Italy
