= Vignale railway station =

Railway station in Italy

Vignale
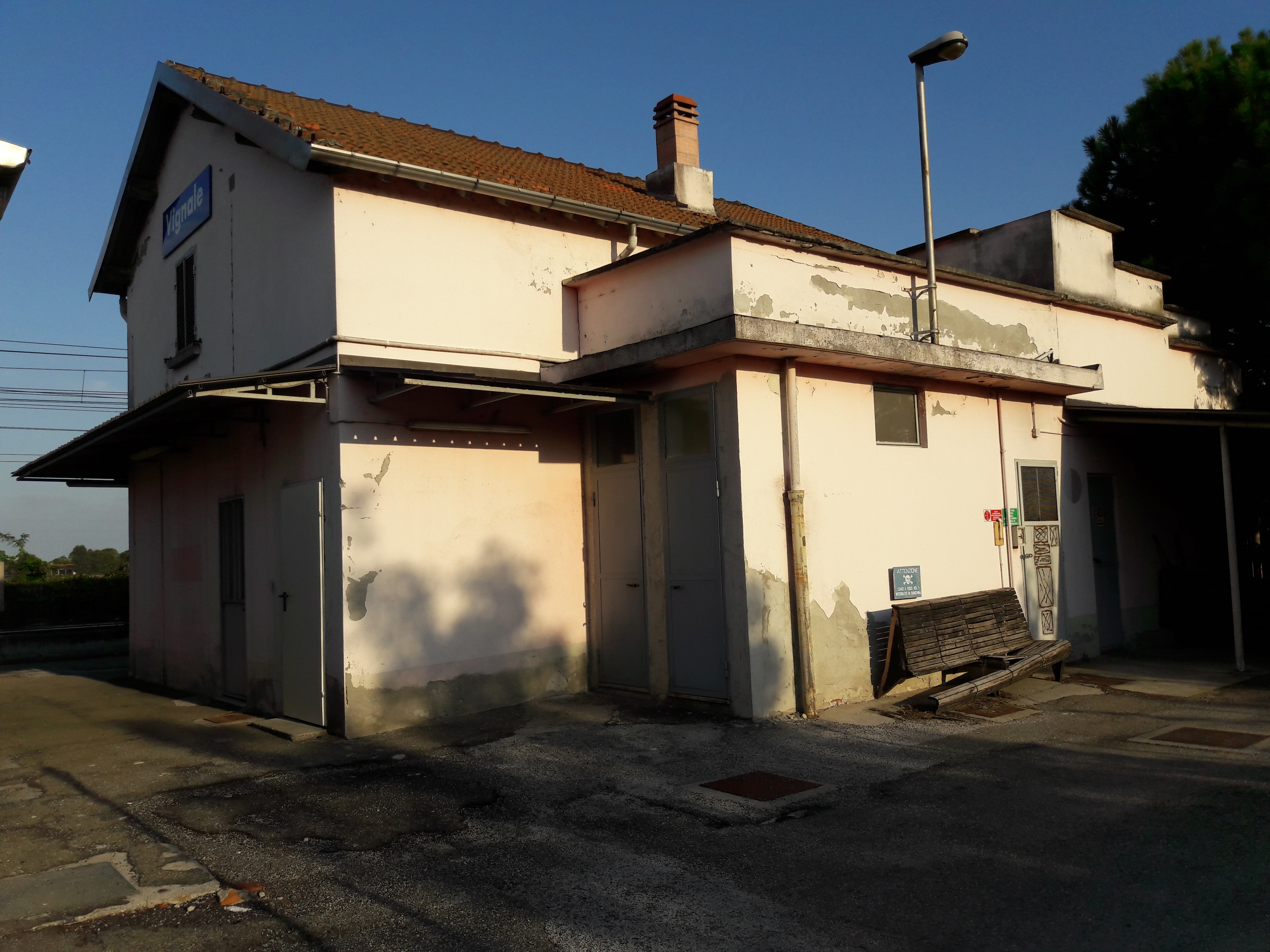
- The passenger building.

General information
- Location: Corso Risorgimento, 290; 28100 Vignale NO; Vignale, Novara, Piedmont; Italy
- Coordinates: 45°28′44″N 08°36′46″E
- Operator: Rete Ferroviaria Italiana
- Lines: Novara–Arona; Novara–Domodossola; Novara–Varallo
- Distance: 3.275 km (2.035 mi) from Novara
- Platforms: 2
- Tracks: 2
- Train operators: Trenitalia
- Connections: Suburban buses

Other information
- Classification: Bronze

History
- Opened: 1855; 171 years ago
Location
- Location within Piedmont Location within Northern Italy Location within Italy

Vignale railway station (Italian: Stazione di Vignale) is the railway station serving the comune of Novara, in the Piedmont region, northwestern Italy. It is the junction of the Novara–Arona, Novara–Domodossola and Novara–Varallo

The station is currently managed by Rete Ferroviaria Italiana (RFI). Train services are operated by Trenitalia. Each of these companies is a subsidiary of Ferrovie dello Stato (FS), Italy's state-owned rail company.

== History ==
The station was opened on 14 June 1855, upon the inauguration the third part of the Alessandria–Novara–Arona railway, from Novara to Arona.

== Features ==
Two tracks of which are equipped with platforms.

== Train services ==
The station is served by the following services:

- Regional services (Treno regionale) Novara - Arona

== See also ==
- History of rail transport in Italy
- List of railway stations in Piedmont
- Rail transport in Italy
- Railway stations in Italy
