= Borgosesia railway station =

Railway station in Italy

Borgosesia
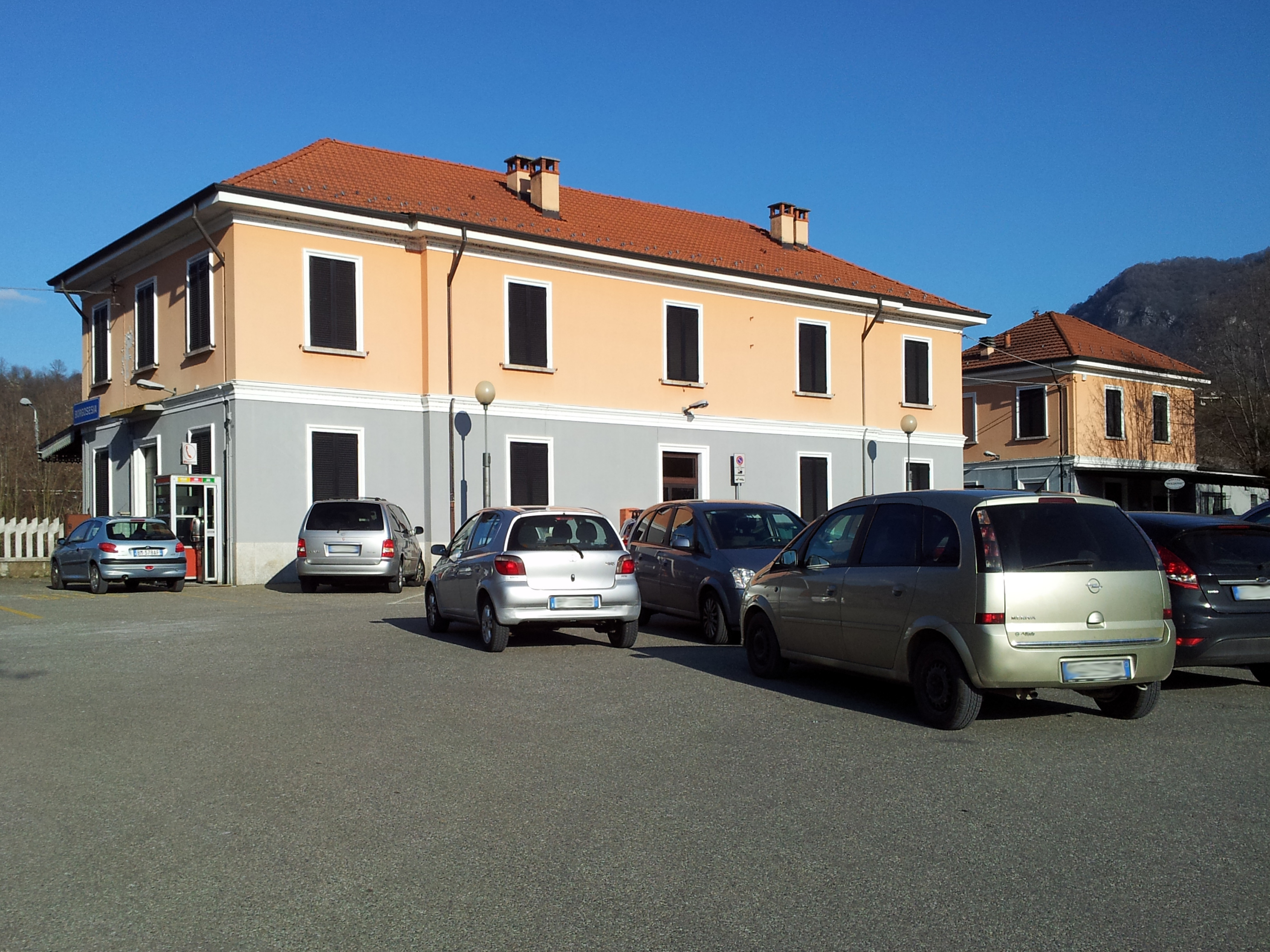
- Side station parking.

General information
- Location: Viale Duca d’Aosta, 101; 13011 Borgosesia VC; Borgosesia, Vercelli, Piedmont; Italy
- Coordinates: 45°42′58″N 08°16′59″E
- Operator: Rete Ferroviaria Italiana
- Line: Novara–Varallo
- Distance: 41.812 km (25.981 mi) from Novara
- Platforms: 2
- Tracks: 3
- Train operators: Trenitalia
- Connections: Suburban buses

Other information
- Classification: Bronze

History
- Opened: 6 November 1885; 140 years ago
Location
- Location within Piedmont Location within Northern Italy Location within Italy

Borgosesia railway station (Italian: Stazione di Borgosesia) is the train station serving the comune of Borgosesia, in the Piedmont region of northwestern Italy. It serves as the junction of the Novara–Varallo.

The station is managed by Rete Ferroviaria Italiana (RFI) and the passenger building by the comune. The station is served only by historic trains, in the service of tourism, in planned dates. The service ordinary passengers It has been suspended from 15 September 2014, by decision of the Piedmont Region. Train services are operated by Fondazione FS and Trenitalia. Each of these companies is a subsidiary of Ferrovie dello Stato (FS), Italy's state-owned rail company.

== History ==
The station was opened on 6 November 1885, upon the inauguration the third part of the Novara–Varallo railway, from Grignasco to Borgosesia.

== Features ==
Three tracks, two of which are equipped with platforms.

== Train services ==
The station is served by the following services:

- Historic train (Treno storico) Novara - Varallo Sesia

== See also ==
- History of rail transport in Italy
- List of railway stations in Piedmont
- Rail transport in Italy
- Railway stations in Italy
