= Santhià–Arona railway =

Railway line in Italy

Overview
- Status: no traffic
- Owner: Rete Ferroviaria Italiana
- Termini: Santhià railway station; Arona railway station
- Stations: 8 station

Service
- Type: Heavy rail
- Operator(s): Trenitalia

History
- Opened: 18 May 1906

Technical
- Line length: 65 km (40 mi)
- Number of tracks: 1
- Track gauge: 1,435 mm (4 ft 8 1/2 in) standard gauge

The Santhià–Arona railway is a railway line in Piedmont, Italy. It was inaugurated from 1905 to 1906.

== Suspension and reopening ==
The service on the railway was suspended from 17 June 2012, by decision of the Piedmont Region. At the time of its closure, the line was served by sixteen trains per day on weekdays and six on weekends, with an average use of fifty passengers per train.

At a meeting in September 2019, a representative of the regional council declared that reopening the line was not financially viable, costing 3.4 million euros more than a bus replacement service. In response, an association for the Turin-Switzerland line stated that the council's decisions, while correct from an accounting perspective, threatened the socioeconomic development of the region.

In January 2022, it was reported that the regional government was prioritising the reopening of the line in talks with FS. In November 2022, it was announced that the line would be reopened by 2024–25, following a campaign by Alberto Gusmeroli, a deputy for the Piedmont 2 constituency.

== Stations ==
=== Santhià ===
Opened in 1856, Santhià railway station sits at the junction of the Turin–Milan, Santhià–Biella and Santhià–Arona railway lines.

=== Rovasenda Alta ===
Rovasenda Alta railway station interchanges with the Biella–Novara railway through the nearby Rovasenda railway station.

=== Romagnano Sesia ===
Romagnano Sesia railway station interchanges with the Novara–Varallo railway.

=== Arona ===
Arona railway station sits at the junction of the Domodossola–Milan, Arona–Novara and Santhià–Arona railway lines.

== See also ==
- List of railway lines in Italy
