= Cossato railway station =

Railway station in Piedmont, Italy

Cossato
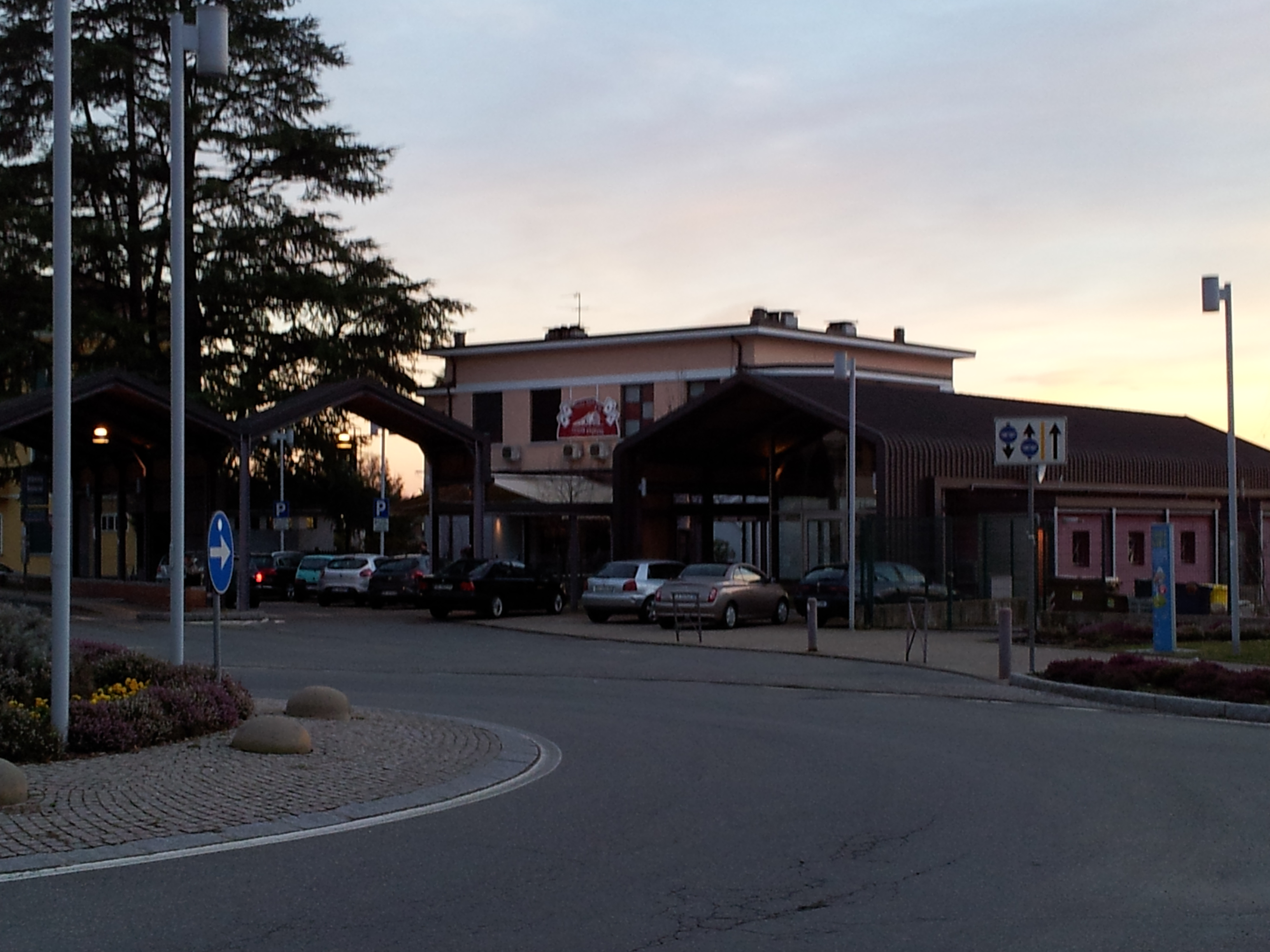
- The passenger building.

General information
- Location: Via Pajetta, 12; 13836 Cossato BI; Cossato, Biella, Piedmont; Italy
- Coordinates: 45°33′51″N 08°10′33″E
- Operator: Rete Ferroviaria Italiana
- Line: Biella–Novara
- Distance: 40.347 km (25.070 mi) from Novara
- Platforms: 2
- Tracks: 3
- Train operators: Trenitalia
- Connections: Suburban buses

Other information
- Classification: Bronze

History
- Opened: 18 May 1939; 87 years ago
Location
- Location within Piedmont Location within Northern Italy Location within Italy

Cossato railway station (Italian: Stazione di Cossato) is the train station serving the town and comune of Cossato, in the Piedmont region of northwestern Italy. It is the junction of the Biella–Novara.

The station is currently managed by Rete Ferroviaria Italiana (RFI), the passenger building is managed by comune and the train services are operated by Trenitalia. Each of these companies is a subsidiary of Ferrovie dello Stato (FS), Italy's state-owned rail company.

== History ==
The station was opened along with the rest of the line from 18 May 1939, becoming however operation only since 20 July 1940 because of the need to complete several systems and the absence of the rolling stock.

From 21 January 1961, in advance to the end of the concession to the "Società Ferrovia Biella-Novara (SFBN)" company, the management of the railway line passed to the state and the exercise of the stations was assumed by Ferrovie dello Stato.

In the year 2000, the plant management passed to Rete Ferroviaria Italiana, which is classified in the category "Bronze".

== Features ==
Three tracks of which are equipped with platforms.

== Train services ==
The station is served by the following service(s):

- Regional services (Treno regionale) Biella San Paolo - Novara

== Gallery ==
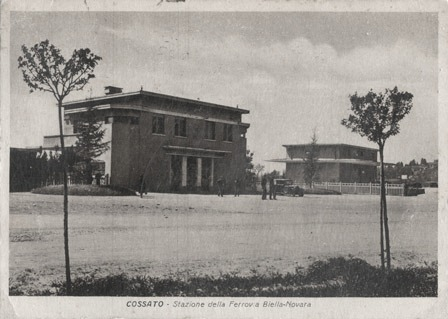
The station in an epoch postcard

== See also ==
- History of rail transport in Italy
- List of railway stations in Piedmont
- Rail transport in Italy
- Railway stations in Italy
