= Mondovì railway station =

Railway station in Italy

Mondovì
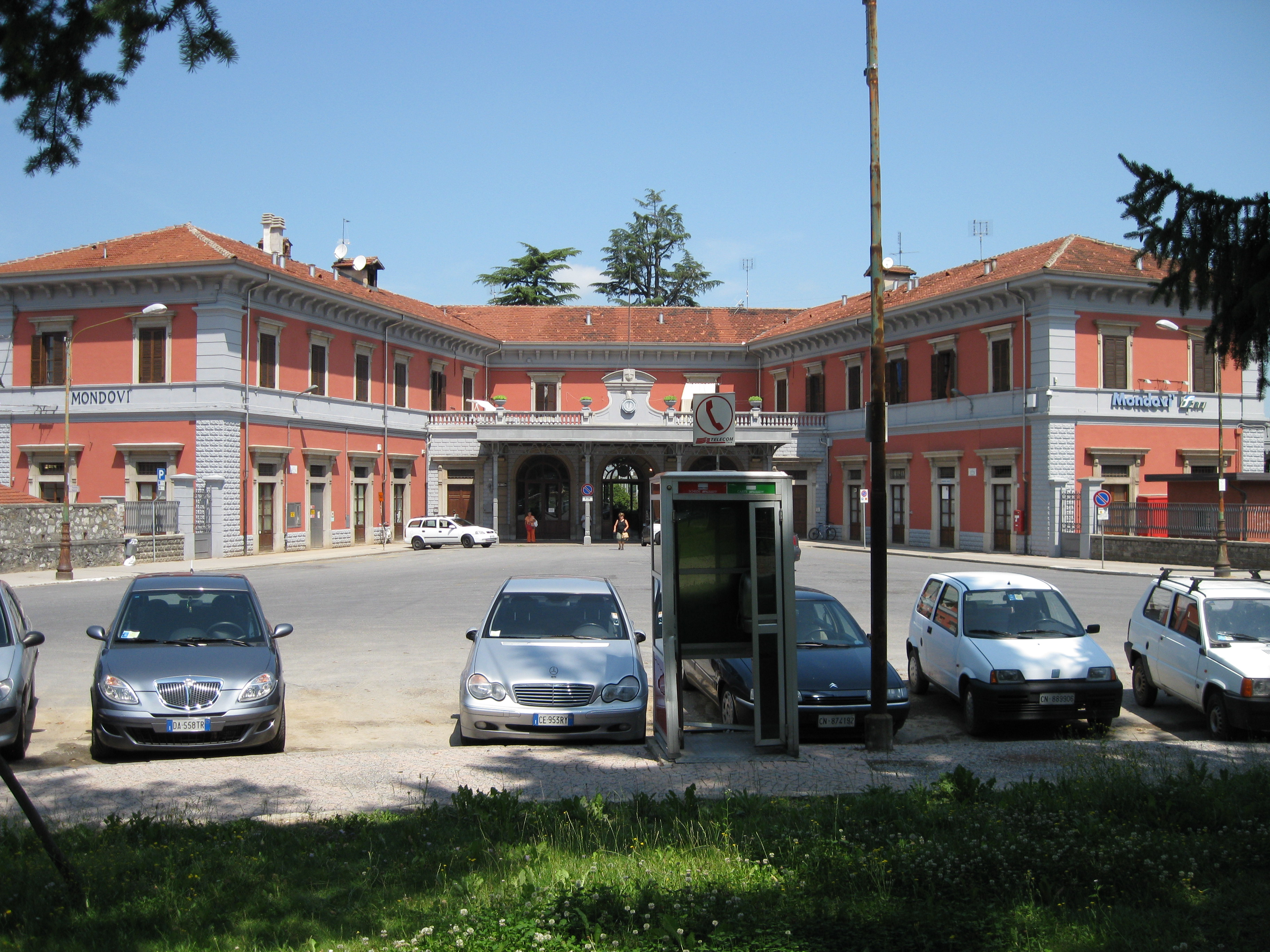
- The passenger building.

General information
- Location: Piazza F. Centro, 1; 12084 Mondovì CN; Mondovì, Cuneo, Piedmont; Italy
- Coordinates: 44°23′53″N 07°48′57″E
- Operator: RFI
- Lines: Turin–Savona; Cuneo–Mondovì; Mondovì–Bastia Mondovì
- Distance: 18.985 km (11.797 mi) from Torino Porta Nuova; 23.905 km (14.854 mi) from Cuneo
- Tracks: 7
- Train operators: Trenitalia
- Connections: Suburban buses

Other information
- Classification: Silver

History
- Opened: 1933; 93 years ago
Location
- Location within Piedmont Location within Northern Italy Location within Italy

Mondovì railway station (Italian: Stazione di Mondovì) is the railway station serving the comune of Mondovì, in the Piedmont region of northwestern Italy. It is the junction of the Turin–Savona and Cuneo–Mondovì railways.

The station is managed by Rete Ferroviaria Italiana (RFI), while train services are operated by Trenitalia. Both companies are subsidiaries of Ferrovie dello Stato (FS), Italy's state-owned rail company.

== History ==
The station was opened from 1933, with the tract Fossano–Ceva railway.

== Features ==
Seven tracks of which are equipped with platforms, pass through the station.

== Train services ==
The station is served by the following services:

- Express services (Regionale veloce) Turin - Fossano - San Giuseppe di Cairo - Savona
- Regional services (Treno regionale) Fossano - San Giuseppe di Cairo
- Tourist services (Treno storico) Turin - Ceva - Ormea

== See also ==
- History of rail transport in Italy
- List of railway stations in Piedmont
- Rail transport in Italy
- Railway stations in Italy
