= Carpignano Sesia railway station =

Railway station in Carpignano Sesia, Italy

Carpignano Sesia
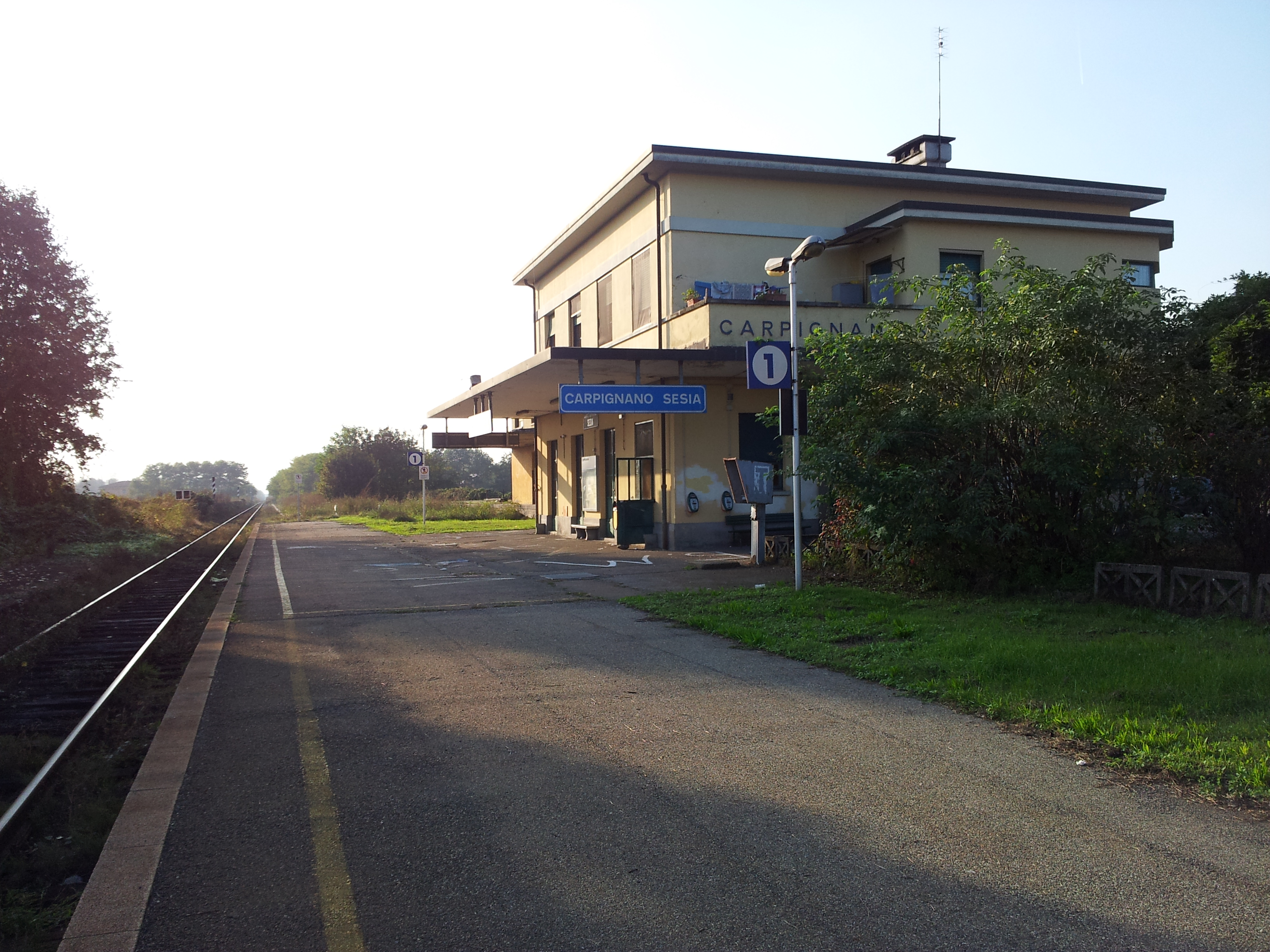
- Carpignano Sesia station railway.

General information
- Location: Piazzale 25 Aprile, 2; 28064 Carpignano Sesia NO; Carpignano Sesia, Novara, Piedmont; Italy
- Coordinates: 45°31′44″N 08°25′22″E
- Operator: Rete Ferroviaria Italiana
- Line: Biella–Novara railway
- Distance: 18.997 km (11.804 mi) from Novara
- Platforms: 1
- Train operators: Trenitalia

Other information
- Classification: Bronze

History
- Opened: 18 May 1939; 87 years ago
Location
- Location within Piedmont Location within Northern Italy Location within Italy

Carpignano Sesia railway station (Italian: Stazione di Carpignano Sesia) is a railway station serving the comune of Carpignano Sesia, in the Piedmont region of northwestern Italy. The station is located on the Biella–Novara railway. The train services are operated by Trenitalia.

The station is currently managed by Rete Ferroviaria Italiana (RFI), a subsidiary of Ferrovie dello Stato (FS), Italy's state-owned rail company.

== History ==
The line was opened on 18 May 1939, however the station only become operational on 20 July 1940 because of the need to complete several systems and a lack of rolling stock. It was originally equipped with two tracks.

From 21 January 1961, in advance to the end of the concession to the "Società Ferrovia Biella-Novara (SFBN)" company, the management of the railway line passed to the state and the operation of the station was assumed by Ferrovie dello Stato.

From 1992 the station was declassified to a railway stop, and remains in operation, but with only one track and one platform.

In the year 2000, the plant management passed to Rete Ferroviaria Italiana, which is classified in the category "Bronze".

== Train services ==
The station is served by the following service(s):

- Regional services (Treno regionale) Biella San Paolo - Rovasenda - Novara

== Gallery ==
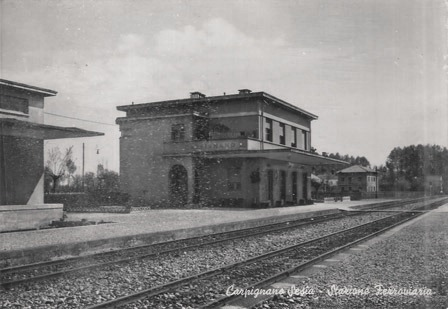
The station in an epoch postcard

== See also ==
- History of rail transport in Italy
- List of railway stations in Piedmont
- Rail transport in Italy
- Railway stations in Italy
