= Biella San Paolo railway station =

Railway station in Biella, Italy

Biella San Paolo
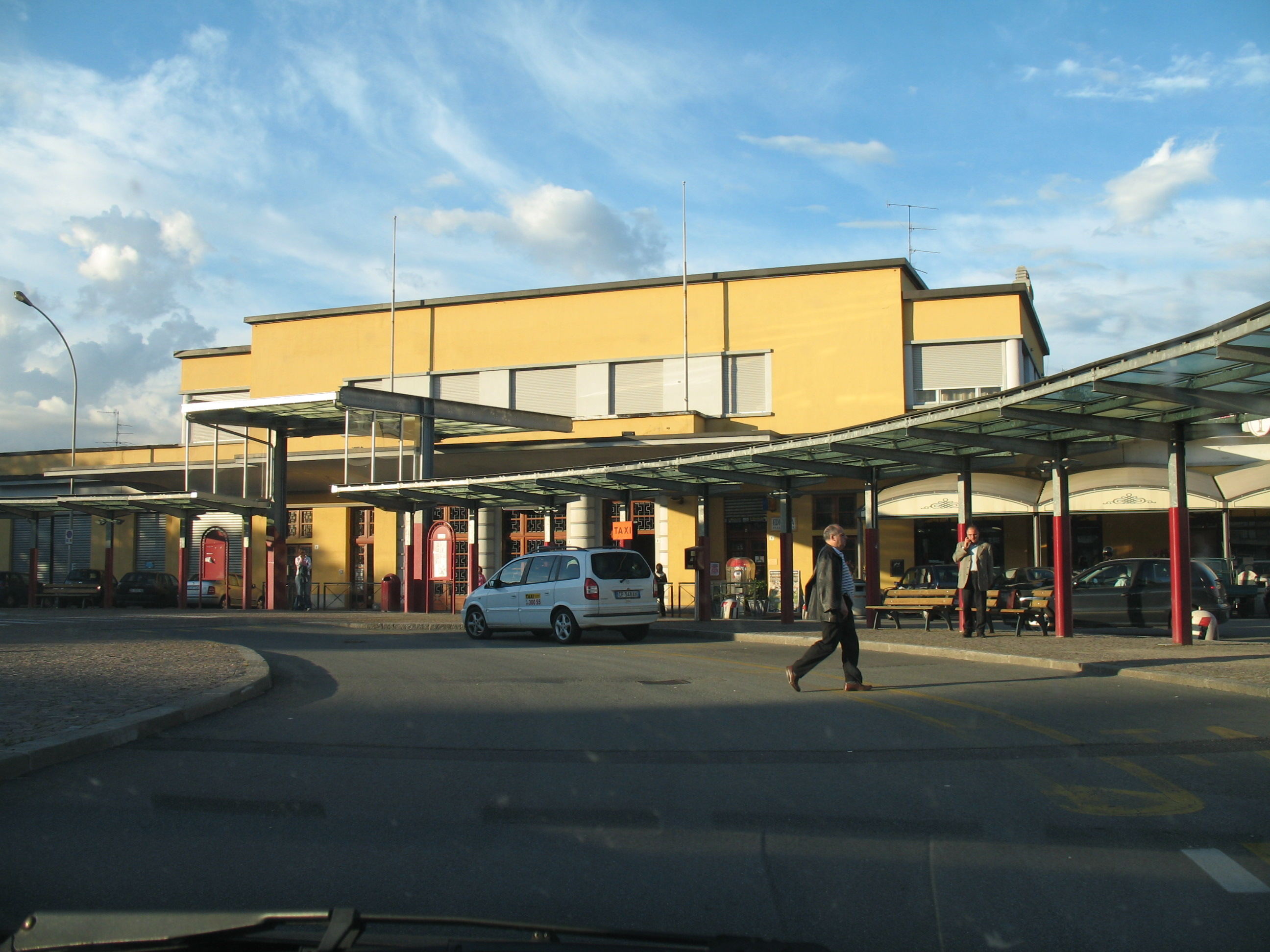
- The passenger building.

General information
- Location: Piazza San Paolo; 13900 Biella BI; Biella, Biella, Piedmont; Italy
- Coordinates: 45°33′26″N 08°04′02″E
- Operator: Rete Ferroviaria Italiana; Centostazioni
- Lines: Biella–Novara; Santhià–Biella
- Distance: 26.724 km (16.606 mi) from Santhià; 50.766 km (31.545 mi) from Novara
- Platforms: 3
- Tracks: 4
- Train operators: Trenitalia
- Connections: Urban (lines 1, 2, 4) and suburban (lines 18, 19, 20, 57) buses

Other information
- Classification: Silver

History
- Opened: 18 May 1939; 87 years ago
Location
- Location within Piedmont Location within Northern Italy Location within Italy

Biella San Paolo railway station is the main station serving the town and comune of Biella, in the Piedmont region, northwestern Italy. It is the junction of the Biella–Novara and Santhià–Biella railways.

The station is managed by Rete Ferroviaria Italiana (RFI) and the commercial area of the passenger building by Centostazioni. Train services are operated by Trenitalia. Each of these companies is a subsidiary of Ferrovie dello Stato Italiane (FS), Italy's state-owned rail company.

A second station, the Biella Chiavazza railway station, is in the district of Chiavazza, a short distance along the line towards Novara.

== History ==
The station was opened along with the rest of the line from 18 May 1939, by the which inaugural convoy would descend Benito Mussolini, becoming however operation only since 20 July 1940 because of the need to complete several systems and the absence of the rolling stock.

The 23 February 1958 was inaugurated the variant of track between Candelo and Biella that allowed him to leave the station to Piazza Vittorio Veneto, opened in 1856 and railway terminus Samthià–Biella railway, considered to be exceeded. The day after the station Biella San Paolo was the terminus of the lines to Novara and Santhià.

From 21 January 1961, in advance to the end of the concession to the "Società Ferrovia Biella-Novara (SFBN)" company, the management of the railway line passed to the state and the exercise of the stations was assumed by Ferrovie dello Stato.

In the year 2000, the plant management passed to Rete Ferroviaria Italiana, which is classified in the category "Silver".

Recently, the station has been affected by modernization works for the deployment of an ACEI train control system, the lengthening of station platforms, and the construction of a 40 metres (130 ft) railway bridge serving tracks 2-3-4. About €7 million was spent, jointly funded by RFI and the Region of Piedmont.

In September 2008, a local health unit analysis had revealed small amounts of asbestos, originating from Balangero in the 1970s, in some stones at the station, but this was though not to cause particular danger to the health of travelers and workers.

== Features ==
Four tracks, three of which are equipped with platforms, pass through the station.

== Passenger movements ==
The station has about 1.2 million passenger movements each year.

== Train services ==
The station is served by the following services:

- Regional services (Treno regionale) Turin - Chivasso - Santhià - Biella
- Regional services (Treno regionale) Santhià - Biella San Paolo
- Regional services (Treno regionale) Biella San Paolo - Novara

Until 2013, the station was served by direct links, including:

- Torino Porta Nuova railway station, regional train (weekdays only), until 11 December 2011
- Milano Porta Garibaldi railway station, regional train (weekdays only), from 11 December 2011 to 15 December 2013
- Pavia railway station, regional train (out on Sunday evenings, back on Friday nights - service suspended during summer months), until 15 December 2013
- Albenga railway station (service operated only in summer), until 15 December 2013

In the past, the station was served daily express trains to Genoa. This service was suppressed 1° June 1986, for reduction of passengers.

== See also ==
- History of rail transport in Italy
- List of railway stations in Piedmont
- Rail transport in Italy
- Railway stations in Italy
