= Casale Monferrato railway station =

Railway station in Piedmont, Italy

Casale Monferrato
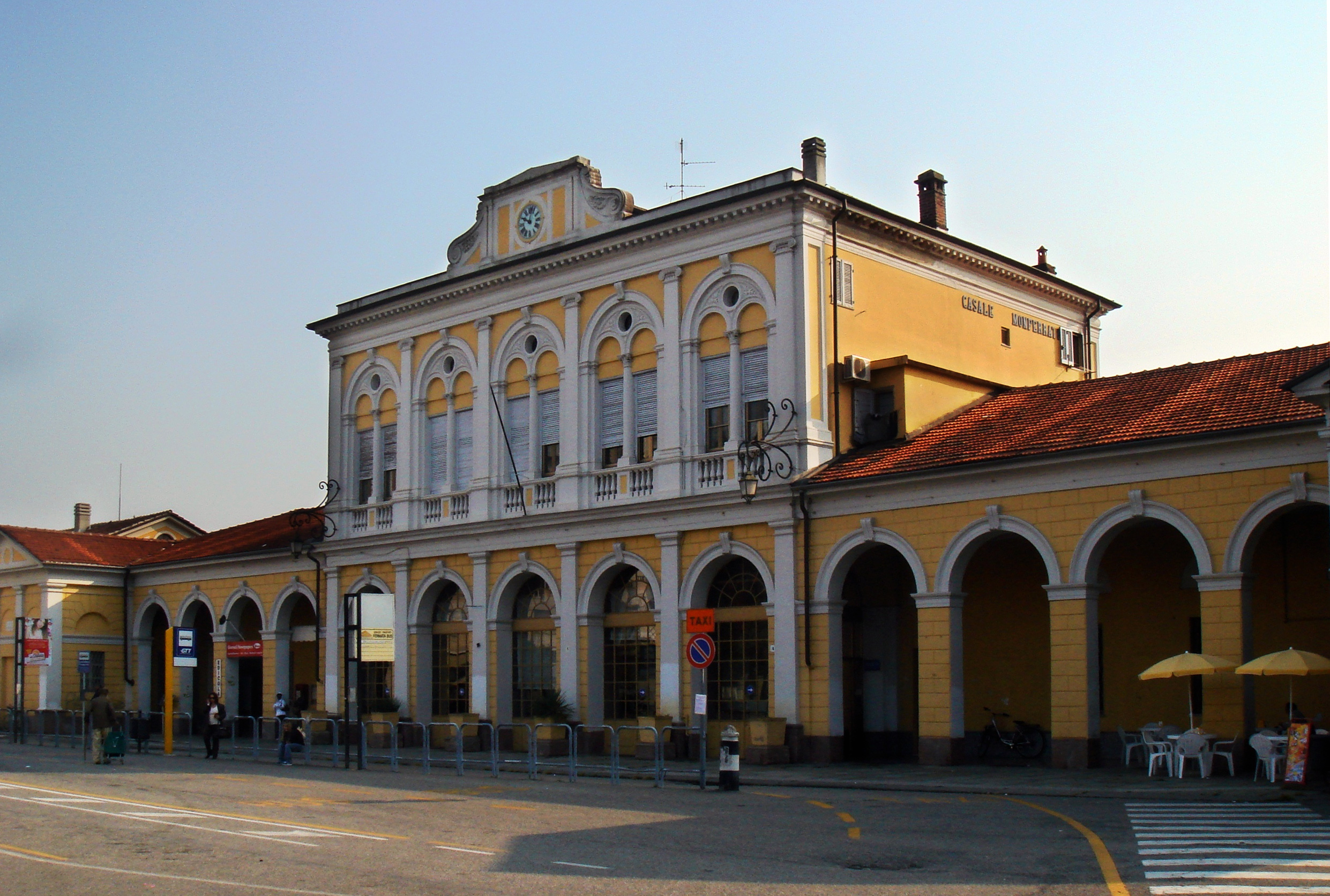

General information
- Location: Piazza Vittorio Veneto, 5; 15033 Casale Monferrato AL; Casale Monferrato, Province of Alessandria, Piedmont; Italy
- Coordinates: 45°8′2″N 8°27′35″E
- Operator: Rete Ferroviaria Italiana
- Lines: Asti–Mortara; Chivasso–Alessandria; Vercelli–Casale Monferrato
- Distance: 65.168 km (40.494 mi) from Castagnole delle Lanze
- Train operators: Trenitalia

Other information
- Classification: Silver

History
- Opened: 22 March 1857; 169 years ago
Location
- Location within Piedmont Location within Northern Italy Location within Italy

Casale Monferrato railway station is the main station of the town of Casale Monferrato, in the Piedmont region of northwestern Italy, and is now the only train station in town at which passenger trains stop.

== Overview ==
It is located in Piazza Vittorio Veneto, close to the city's principal public gardens, and to the east of the city centre. The station previously provided access to three railway lines: Asti – Mortara, Vercelli–Casale Monferrato and Chivasso–Alessandria: of these only the last remains active. The station was opened on 22 March 1857, upon the inauguration of the Vercelli–Casale–Valenza railway. On 6 July 1870 the line between Mortara and Asti opened; it was extended to Castagnole six days later. In April 1887, completion of track between Castelrosso and Casale Popolo brought about a direct connection to Chivasso. The station was opened on 22 March 1857; 169 years ago, upon the inauguration of the Vercelli–Casale–Valenza railway. On 6 July 1870 the line between Mortara and Asti opened; it was extended to Castagnole six days later. In April 1887, completion of track between Castelrosso and Casale Popolo brought about a direct connection to Chivasso.

Today the station is managed by Rete Ferroviaria Italiana which classifies it under the silver category. Services provided include a ticket office, a bar, a news-stand and toilets. The platforms are connected by a pedestrian underpass. Parking and bus services are available close to the station.

== Gallery ==
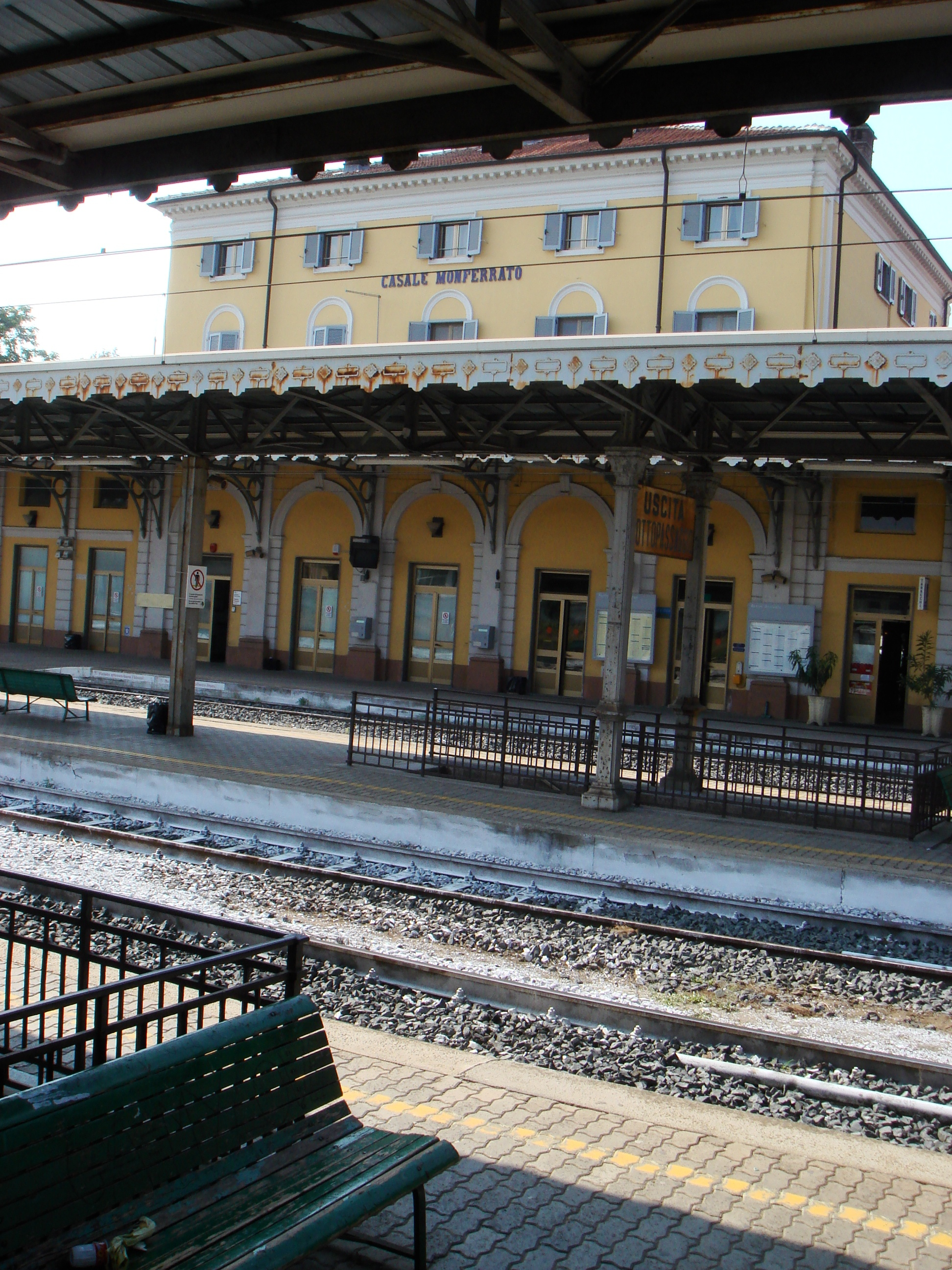
View of platforms

== See also ==
- History of rail transport in Italy
- List of railway stations in Piedmont
- Rail transport in Italy
- Railway stations in Italy
