= Druogno =

- Comune
- Comune di Druogno
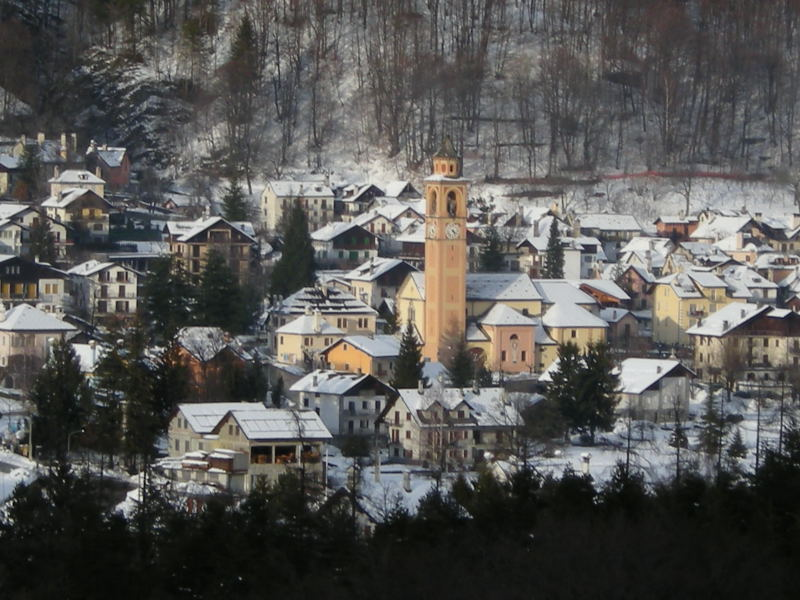

- Location within Italy Location within Piedmont
- Coordinates: 46°8′N 8°28′E
- Country: Italy
- Region: Piedmont
- Province: Province of Verbano-Cusio-Ossola (VB)

Government
  - Mayor: Marco Zanoletti

Area
  - Total: 29.0 km^{2} (11.2 sq mi)
- Elevation: 836 m (2,743 ft)

Population (Dec. 2004)
  - Total: 955
  - Density: 32.9/km^{2} (85.3/sq mi)
- Time zone: UTC+1 (CET)
  - Summer (DST): UTC+2 (CEST)
- Postal code: 28030
- Dialing code: 0324

Druogno (Lombard: Dravegn) is a comune (municipality) in the Province of Verbano-Cusio-Ossola in the Italian region Piedmont, located about 130 kilometres (81 mi) northeast of Turin and about 25 kilometres (16 mi) north of Verbania. As of 31 December 2004, it had a population of 955 and an area of 29.0 square kilometres (11.2 mi^{2}).

Druogno borders the following municipalities: Masera, Santa Maria Maggiore, Trontano.

View of the town of Albogno in Druogno

== Demographic evolution ==
Historical population

Year	Pop.	±%
1861	1,077	—
1871	1,173	+8.9%
1881	1,082	−7.8%
1901	884	−18.3%
1911	930	+5.2%

Year	Pop.	±%
1921	948	+1.9%
1931	942	−0.6%
1936	914	−3.0%
1951	958	+4.8%
1961	950	−0.8%

Year	Pop.	±%
1971	935	−1.6%
1981	935	+0.0%
1991	980	+4.8%
2001	961	−1.9%

Source: Data from ISTAT
