= Masera =

- Comune
- Comune di Masera
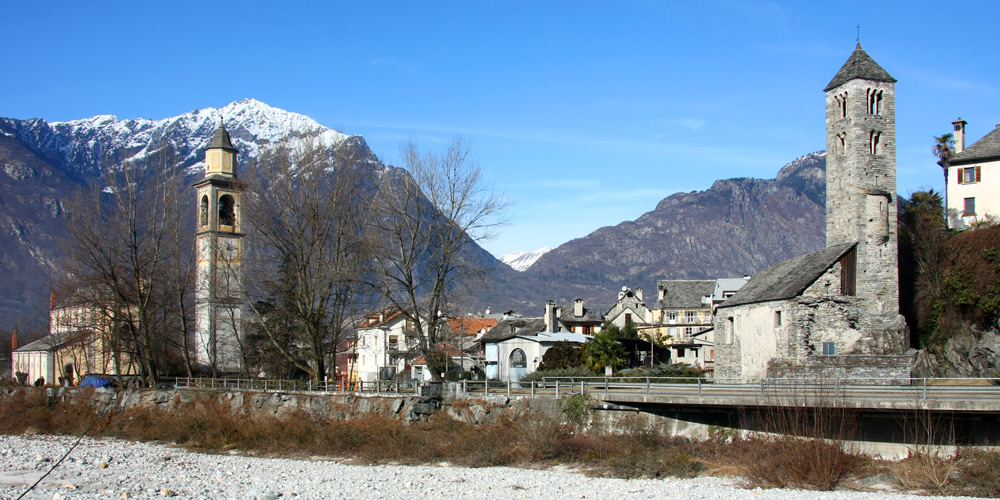

- Location within Italy Location within Piedmont
- Coordinates: 46°10′N 8°18′E
- Country: Italy
- Region: Piedmont
- Province: Province of Verbano-Cusio-Ossola (VB)

Area
  - Total: 20.1 km^{2} (7.8 sq mi)

Population (Dec. 2004)
  - Total: 1,483
  - Density: 73.8/km^{2} (191/sq mi)
- Demonym: Maseresi
- Time zone: UTC+1 (CET)
  - Summer (DST): UTC+2 (CEST)
- Postal code: 28855
- Dialing code: 0324

Masera is a comune (municipality) in the Province of Verbano-Cusio-Ossola in the Italian region Piedmont, located about 130 kilometres (81 mi) northeast of Turin and about 30 kilometres (19 mi) northwest of Verbania. As of 31 December 2004, it had a population of 1,483 and an area of 20.1 square kilometres (7.8 mi^{2}).

Masera borders the following municipalities: Crevoladossola, Domodossola, Druogno, Montecrestese, Santa Maria Maggiore, Trontano.

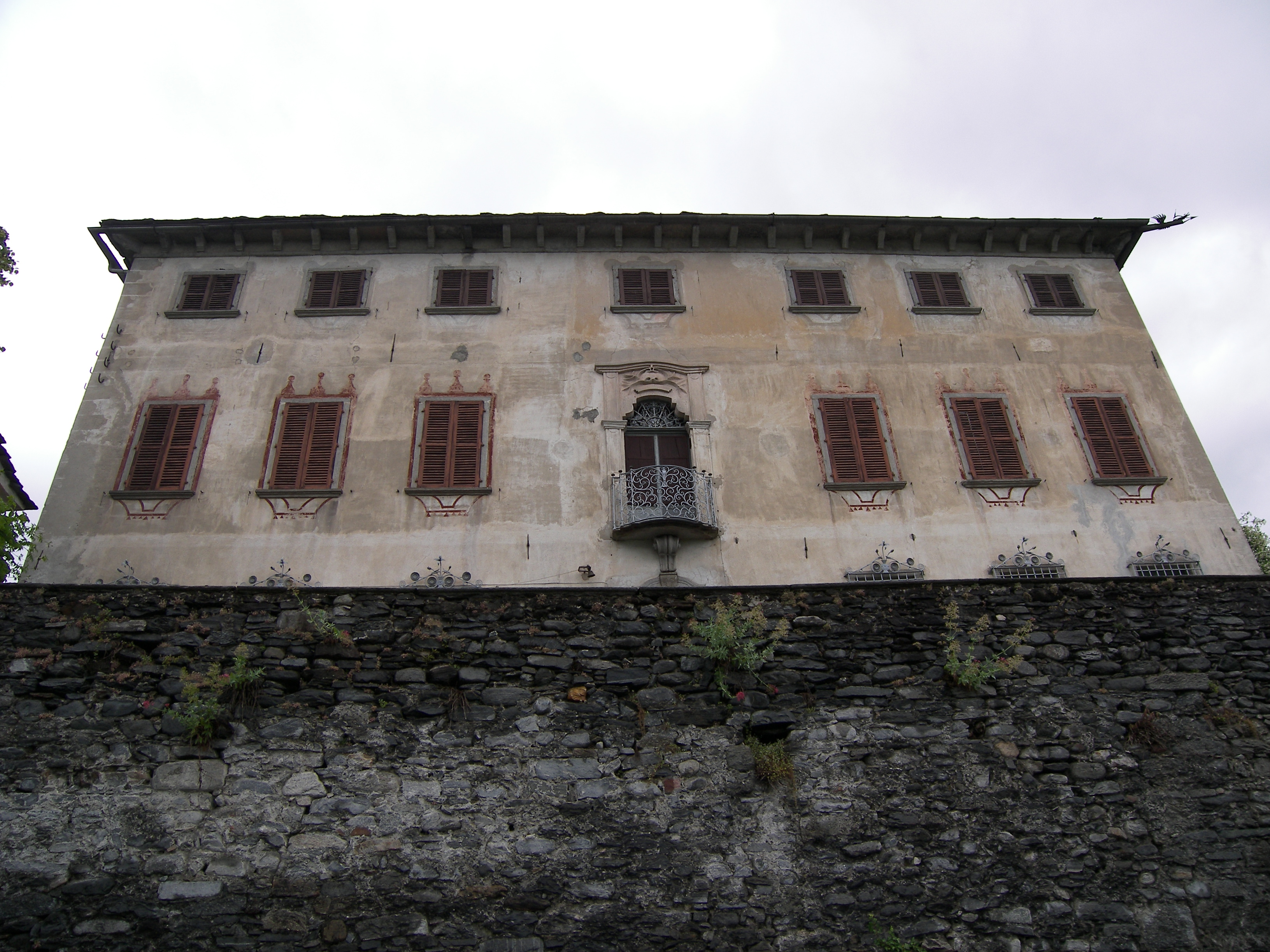
The Farina house built in 1683

== Demographic evolution ==
Historical population

Year	Pop.	±%
1861	994	—
1871	1,098	+10.5%
1881	1,121	+2.1%
1901	1,060	−5.4%
1911	1,028	−3.0%

Year	Pop.	±%
1921	1,165	+13.3%
1931	1,132	−2.8%
1936	1,175	+3.8%
1951	1,232	+4.9%
1961	1,253	+1.7%

Year	Pop.	±%
1971	1,236	−1.4%
1981	1,199	−3.0%
1991	1,257	+4.8%
2001	1,429	+13.7%

Source: Data from ISTAT
