= Ceva railway station =

Railway station in Italy

Ceva
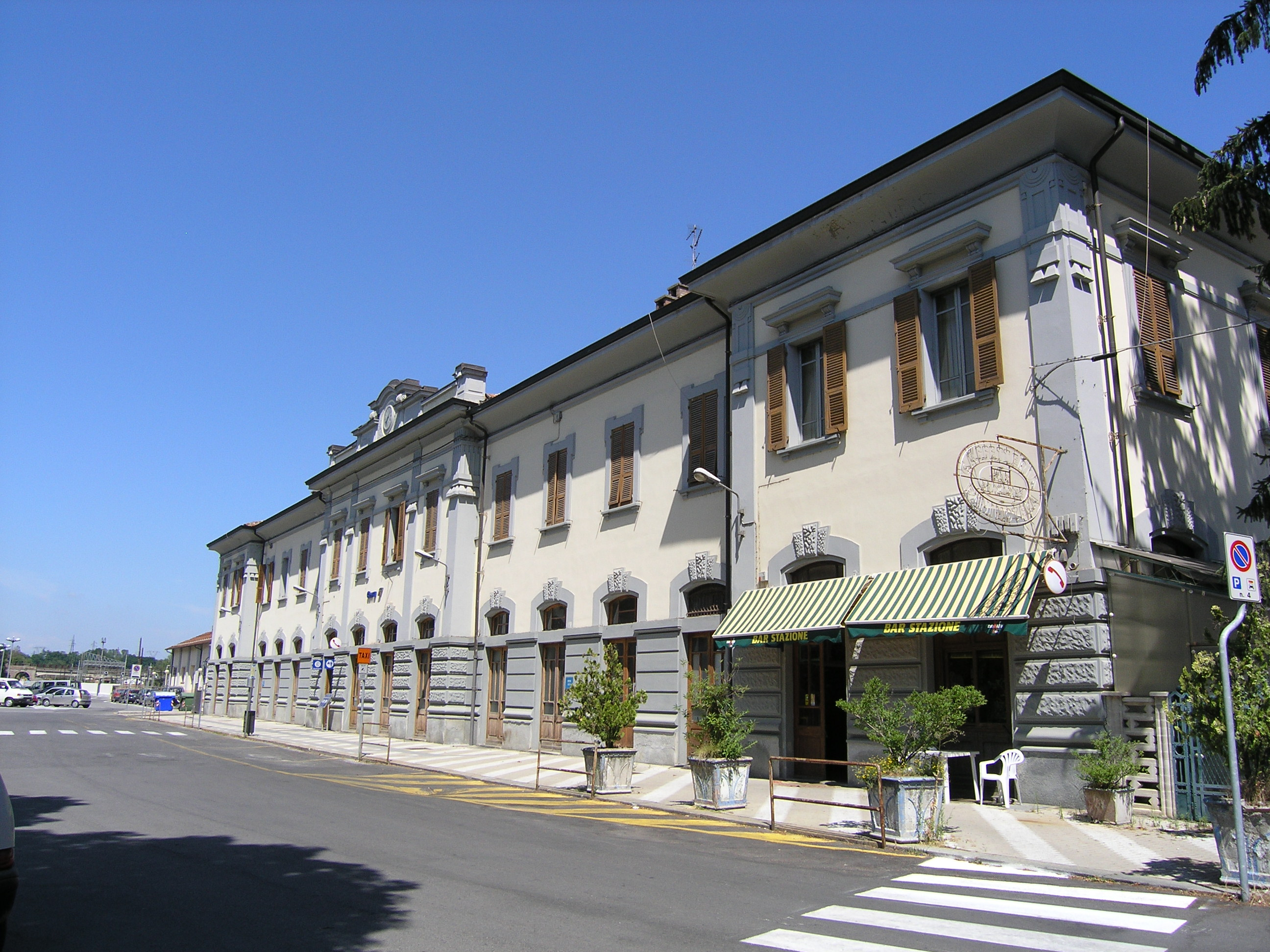
- The passenger building.

General information
- Location: Piazza Stazione, 4; 12073 Ceva CN; Ceva, Cuneo, Piedmont; Italy
- Coordinates: 44°23′22″N 08°01′54″E
- Operator: RFI
- Lines: Turin–Savona; Ceva–Ormea; Bra–Ceva
- Distance: 38.156 km (23.709 mi) from Torino Porta Nuova
- Tracks: 6
- Train operators: Trenitalia
- Connections: Suburban buses

Other information
- Classification: Silver

History
- Opened: 1874; 152 years ago
Location
- Location within Piedmont Location within Northern Italy Location within Italy

Ceva railway station (Italian: Stazione di Ceva) is the railway station serving the comune of Ceva, in the Piedmont region of northwestern Italy. It is the junction of the Turin–Savona and Ceva–Ormea railways.

The station is currently managed by Rete Ferroviaria Italiana (RFI), while the train services are operated by Trenitalia. Both companies are subsidiaries of Ferrovie dello Stato (FS), Italy's state-owned rail company.

== History ==
The station was opened on 28 September 1874, upon the inauguration of the track from Ceva to Savona of the Turin–Savona railway.

The line Bra–Ceva closed in 1994. Passenger services on the line to Ormea suspended from 17 June 2012 and reopened from 11 September 2016 as a tourist railway.

== Train services ==
The station is served by the following service(s):

- Express services (Regionale veloce) Turin - Fossano - San Giuseppe di Cairo - Savona
- Regional services (Treno regionale) Fossano - San Giuseppe di Cairo
- Historic train (Treno storico) Turin - Ceva - Ormea
