= Bazzana =

Bazzana is a surname. Notable people with the surname include:

- Alessandro Bazzana (born 1984), Italian cyclist
- Kevin Bazzana (born 1963), Canadian historian and biographer
- Marcello Bazzana (1953–2011), Italian ski jumper
- Nicolás Bazzana (born 1996), Argentine footballer
- Travis Bazzana (born 2002), Australian baseball player
