= Trontano =

- Comune
- Comune di Trontano
- Location within Italy Location within Piedmont
- Coordinates: 46°7′20″N 8°20′0″E
- Country: Italy
- Region: Piedmont
- Province: Province of Verbano-Cusio-Ossola (VB)

Area
  - Total: 58.0 km^{2} (22.4 sq mi)
- Elevation: 520 m (1,710 ft)

Population (Dec. 2004)
  - Total: 1,684
  - Density: 29.0/km^{2} (75.2/sq mi)
- Time zone: UTC+1 (CET)
  - Summer (DST): UTC+2 (CEST)
- Postal code: 28859
- Dialing code: 0324

Trontano is a comune (municipality) in the Province of Verbano-Cusio-Ossola in the Italian Piedmont region, located about 120 kilometres (75 mi) northeast of Turin and about 25 kilometres (16 mi) northwest of Verbania. As of 31 December 2004, it had a population of 1,684 and an area of 58.0 square kilometres (22.4 mi^{2}).

Trontano borders the following municipalities: Beura-Cardezza, Cossogno, Domodossola, Druogno, Malesco, Masera, Premosello-Chiovenda, Santa Maria Maggiore.

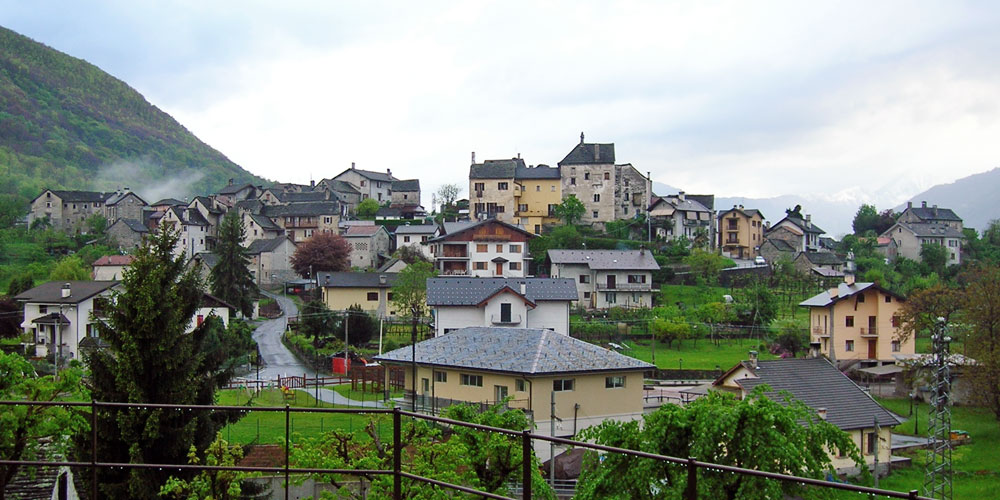
view of The town

== Demographic evolution ==
Historical population

Year	Pop.	±%
1861	1,235	—
1871	1,342	+8.7%
1881	1,353	+0.8%
1901	1,205	−10.9%
1911	1,306	+8.4%

Year	Pop.	±%
1921	1,388	+6.3%
1931	1,492	+7.5%
1936	1,621	+8.6%
1951	1,575	−2.8%
1961	1,541	−2.2%

Year	Pop.	±%
1971	1,591	+3.2%
1981	1,711	+7.5%
1991	1,654	−3.3%
2001	1,710	+3.4%

Source: Data from ISTAT
