= Turin–Fossano–Savona railway =

Railway line in Italy

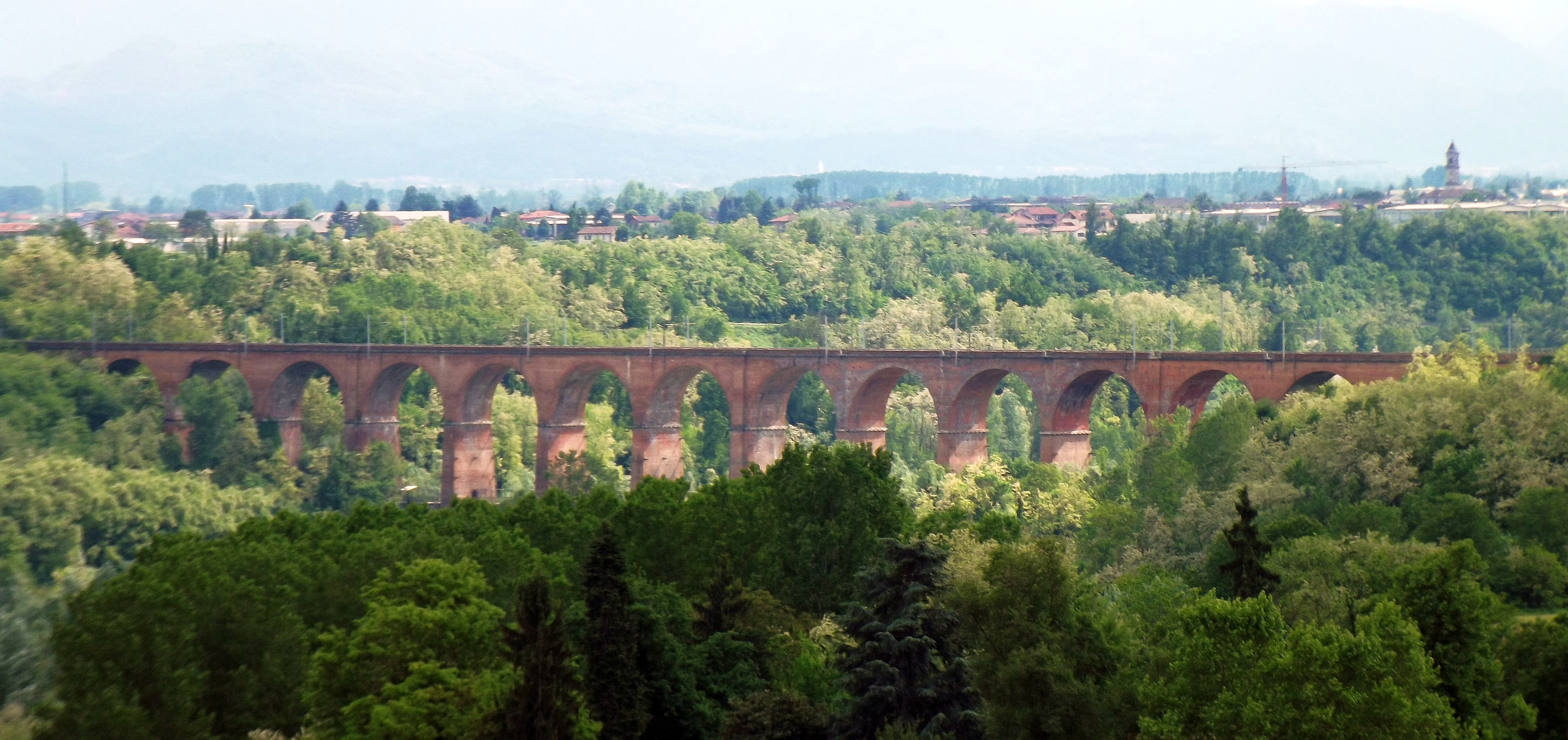

Overview
- Status: in use
- Owner: RFI
- Locale: Italy
- Termini: Turin; Savona
- Stations: 17 station, 6 stops

Service
- Type: Heavy rail
- Operator: Trenitalia

History
- Opened: 24 September 1848; 7 February 1954

Technical
- Line length: 153 km (95 mi)
- Num of tracks: 2 (Turin–Ceva); 1 (Ceva–Savona)
- Track gauge: 1,435 mm (4 ft 8 1/2 in) standard gauge
- Operating speed: 160 km/h (99 mph)

The Turin–Fossano–Savona railway is a major Italian railway that links the cities of Turin and Savona. The railway is double track up to Ceva, standard gauge and fully electrified at 3 kV DC. It connects the cities of Trofarello, Carmagnola, Cavallermaggiore, Savigliano, Fossano, Mondovì, Ceva and San Giuseppe di Cairo.

== History ==
The railway was opened in stages between 1848 and 1954.

Tract	Inauguration
Turin–Trofarello	24 September 1848
Trofarello–Savigliano	16 March 1853
Savigliano–Fossano	15 December 1853
Ceva–Savona (for Ferrania)	28 September 1874
San Giuseppe di Cairo–Altare	14 November 1923
Fossano–Ceva	28 October 1933
Altare–Savona	7 February 1954

== See also ==
- List of railway lines in Italy

== Bibliography ==
- RFI - Fascicolo Linea 8 (Torino–San Giuseppe di Cairo)
- RFI - Fascicolo Linea 75 (San Giuseppe di Cairo–Savona)
- Franco Dell'Amico, Due valichi per Savona, in "I Treni Oggi" n. 61 (giugno 1986), pp. 16–22.
- Rebagliati Franco, Dell'Amico Franco, Siri Mario, I centoventi anni della linea ferroviaria Torino-Savona (1874-1994), Alzani Editore
