= Santhià–Biella railway =

Railway line in Italy

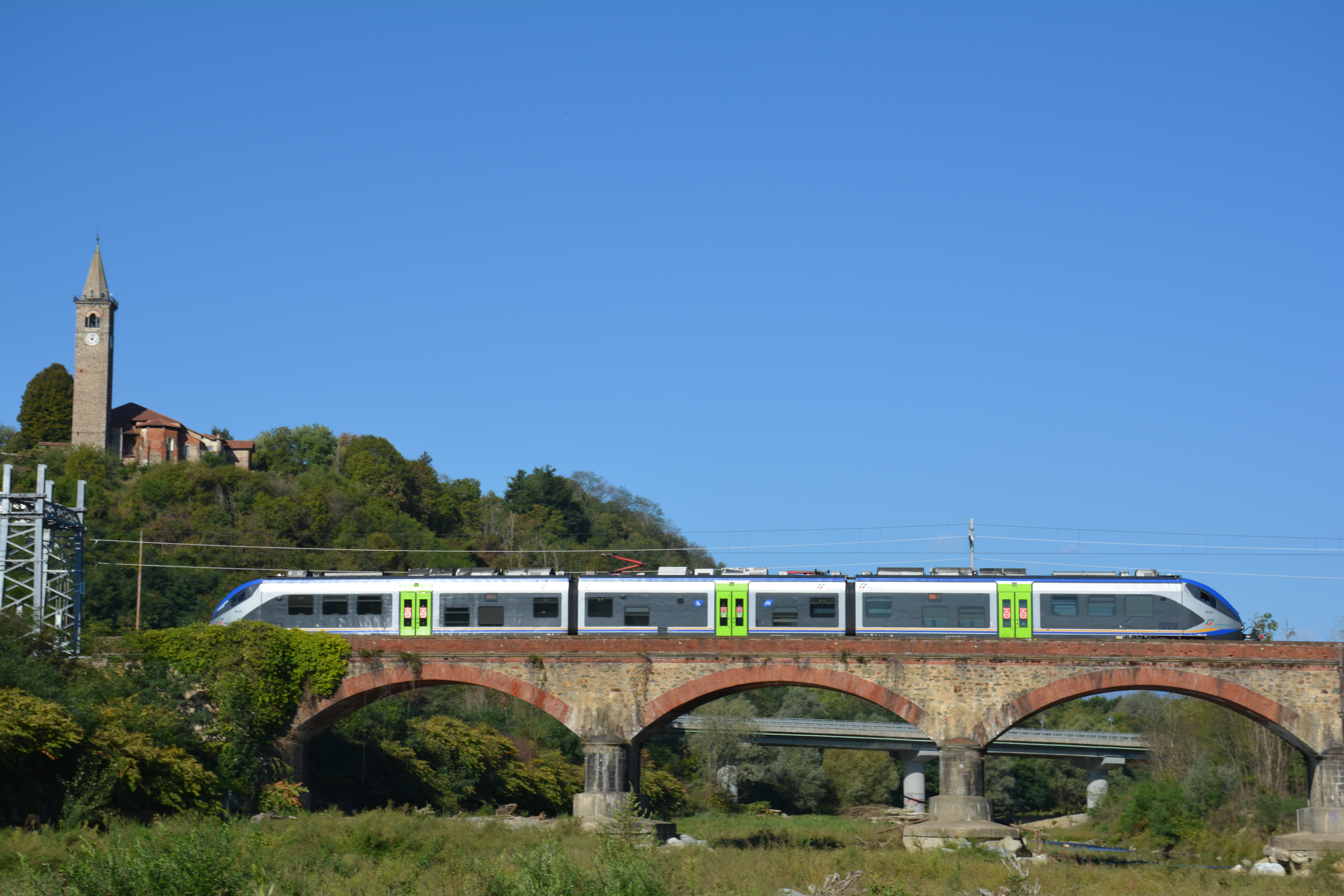
- The railway bridge over the torrent Elvo. In transit an electric Minuet train

Overview
- Status: in use
- Owner: RFI
- Locale: Piedmont, Italy
- Termini: Santhià railway station; Biella San Paolo railway station
- Stations: 1 station 3 stops

Service
- Type: Heavy rail
- Operator(s): Trenitalia

History
- Opened: 8 September 1856

Technical
- Line length: 27 km (17 mi)
- Number of tracks: 1
- Track gauge: 1,435 mm (4 ft 8 1/2 in) standard gauge
- Electrification: 3 kV DC
- Operating speed: 130 km/h (81 mph)

The Santhià–Biella railway is a regional railway line of Piedmont in Italy, that connects Biella to Santhià railway node for Turin.

== History ==
The railway was inaugurated from 8 September 1856.

Since 10 July 1951, with the end of the concession to the "Società Strade Ferrate di Biella (SFB)" company, the management of the railway line passed to the state and the exercise was assumed by Ferrovie dello Stato.

In the year 2000, the entire line management passed to Rete Ferroviaria Italiana.

== See also ==
- List of railway lines in Italy
