= Ceva–Ormea railway =

Railway line in Italy

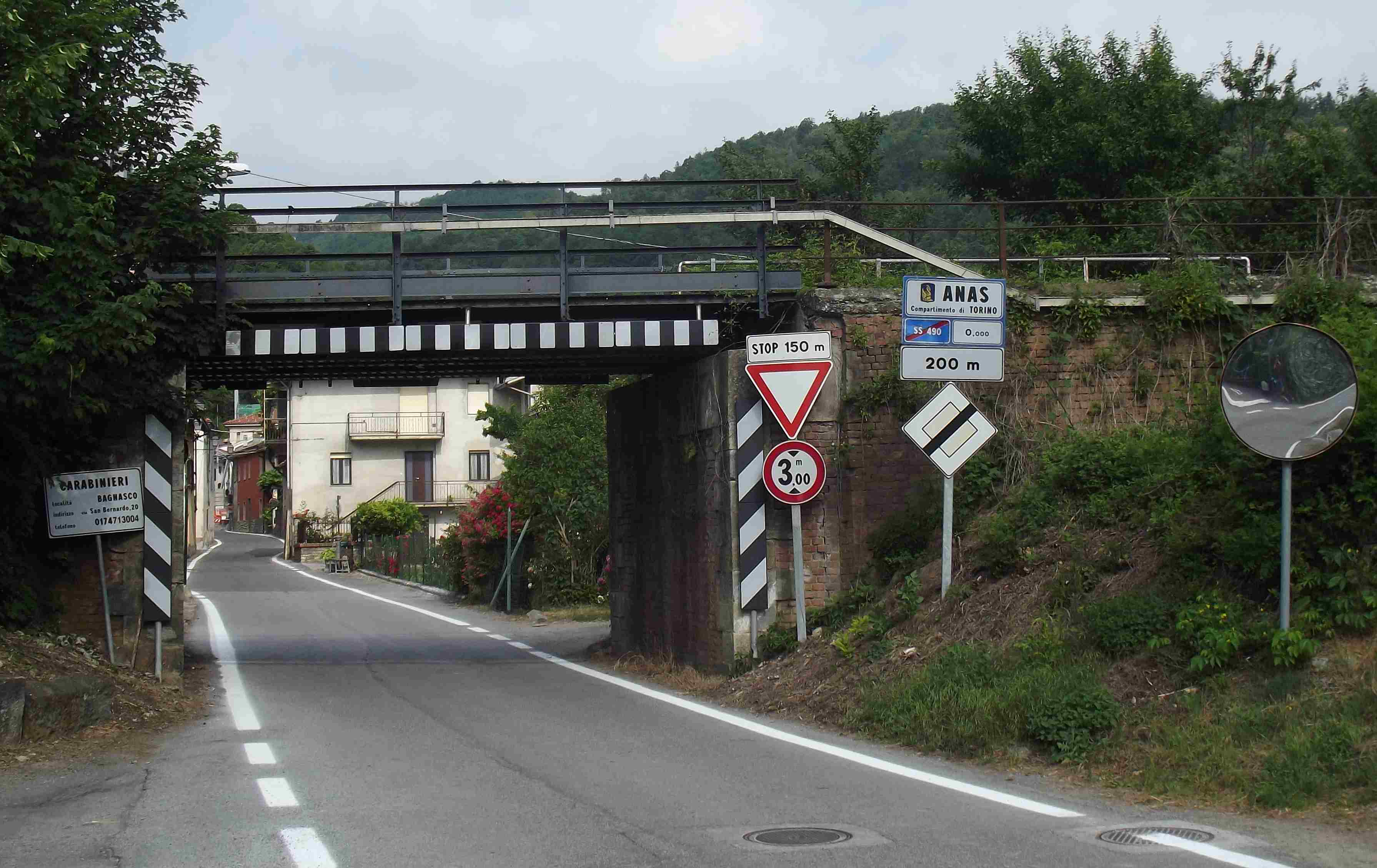
- The railway bridge in Bagnasco

Overview
- Status: in use
- Owner: RFI
- Locale: Piedmont, Italy
- Termini: Ceva; Ormea
- Stations: 2 station 6 stops

Service
- Type: Heavy rail
- Operator(s): Trenitalia

History
- Opened: February 15, 1893

Technical
- Line length: 35 km (22 mi)
- Number of tracks: 1
- Track gauge: 1,435 mm (4 ft 8 1/2 in) standard gauge
- Electrification: no

The Ceva–Ormea railway is a local railway line of Piedmont in Italy, situated in the province of Cuneo, that connect Ormea to Ceva railway node, crossing the high valley of Tanaro. From 2016 is used only as a tourist railway.

The tourist service is performed by historic trains of Fondazione FS, operated by Trenitalia, on specific dates. Regular traffic was suspended from 17 June 2012, by decision of the Piedmont Region.

== History ==
The railway was opened from 1889 to 1893.

Tract	Inauguration
Ceva–Priola	15 September 1889
Priola–Garessio	15 July 1890
Garessio–Trappa	15 April 1891
Trappa–Ormea	15 February 1893

== See also ==
- List of railway lines in Italy

== Bibliography ==
- RFI - Fascicolo Linea 8
