= Biella–Novara railway =

Railway line in Italy

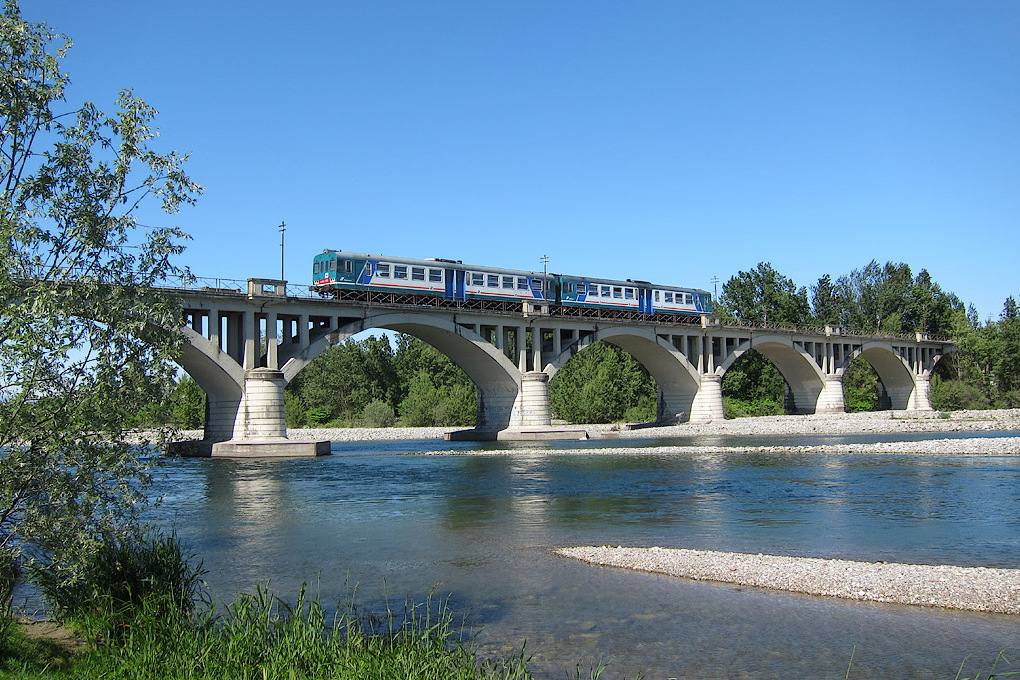
- The railway bridge over the river Sesia. In transit two Aln 663

Overview
- Status: in use
- Owner: RFI
- Locale: Piedmont, Italy
- Termini: Biella San Paolo railway station; Novara railway station
- Stations: 3 station 6 stops

Service
- Type: Heavy rail
- Operator(s): Trenitalia

History
- Opened: 18 May 1939

Technical
- Line length: 51 km (32 mi)
- Number of tracks: 1
- Track gauge: 1,435 mm (4 ft 8 1/2 in) standard gauge
- Operating speed: 90 km/h (56 mph)

The Biella–Novara railway is a regional railway line of Piedmont in Italy, that connects Biella to Novara railway node for Milan and Alessandria, serving some countries of the province of Vercelli and Novara.

== History ==
The railway was inaugurated from 18 May 1939 with the presence of Benito Mussolini, becoming however operational only since 20 July 1940 because of the need to complete several systems and the absence of the rolling stock.

From 21 January 1961, in advance of the end of the concession to the "Società Ferrovia Biella-Novara (SFBN)" company, the management of the railway line passed to the state and the exercise was assumed by Ferrovie dello Stato.

In the year 2000, the entire line management passed to Rete Ferroviaria Italiana.

== See also ==
- List of railway lines in Italy

== Bibliography ==
- RFI - Fascicolo Linea 14
