= Novara–Varallo railway =

Regional railway line in Piedmont, Italy

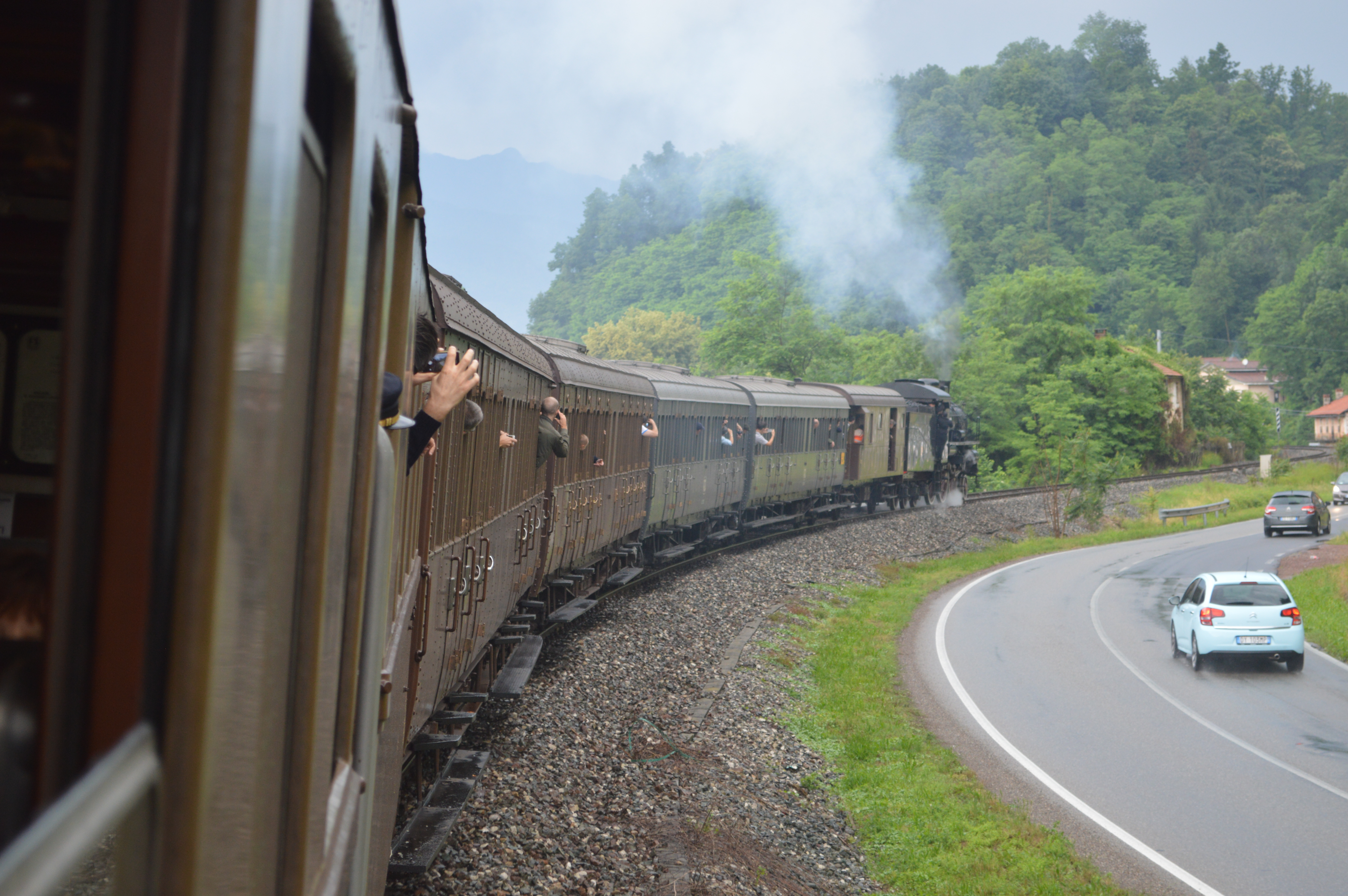
- The trip on the historic train, near Borgosesia

Overview
- Status: in use
- Owner: RFI
- Locale: Piedmont, Italy
- Termini: Novara; Varallo Sesia
- Stations: 3 station 7 stops

Service
- Type: Heavy rail
- Operator(s): Trenitalia

History
- Opened: 12 April 1886

Technical
- Line length: 54 km (34 mi)
- Number of tracks: 1
- Track gauge: 1,435 mm (4 ft 8 1/2 in) standard gauge
- Electrification: 3000 V CC from Novara to Vignale
- Operating speed: 90–120 km/h (56–75 mph)

The Novara–Varallo railway is a regional railway line of Piedmont in Italy, that connect Varallo to Novara railway node, crossing Valsesia. Since 2015, it is used only as a tourist railway and for freight service in the tract Novara-Romagnano Sesia.

The tourist service is performed by historic trains of Fondazione FS, operated by Trenitalia, on specific dates. Regular passenger service was suspended from 15 September 2014, by decision of the Piedmont Region.

== History ==
The railway was opened from 1883 to 1886.

Tract	Inauguration
Novara–Vignale	14 June 1855
Vignale–Romagnano Sesia	22 February 1883
Romagnano Sesia–Grignasco	6 November 1884
Grignasco–Borgosesia	6 November 1885
Borgosesia–Varallo	12 April 1886

== See also ==
- List of railway lines in Italy
