= Santhià railway station =

Railway station in Italy

Santhià
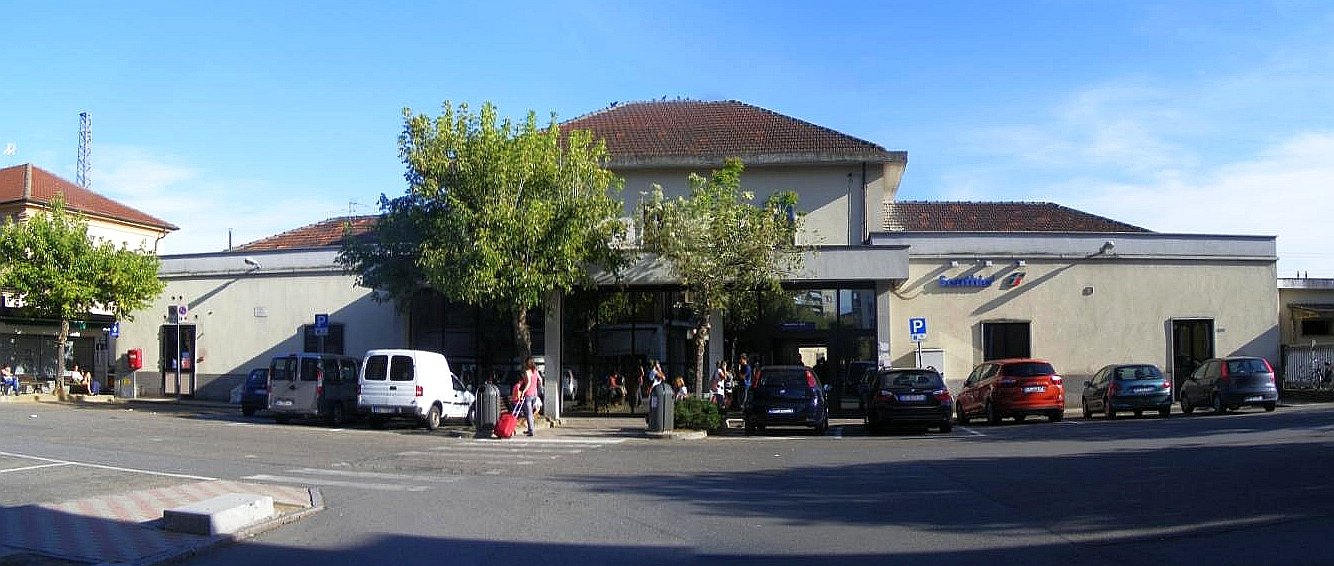
- The passenger building.

General information
- Location: Piazza Verdi, 5; 13900 Santhià VC; Santhià, Vercelli, Piedmont; Italy
- Coordinates: 45°21′50″N 08°10′48″E
- Operator: Rete Ferroviaria Italiana
- Lines: Turin–Milan; Santhià–Biella; Santhià–Arona
- Distance: 57.933 km (35.998 mi) from Torino Porta Nuova
- Platforms: 5
- Train operators: Trenitalia
- Connections: Suburban buses

Other information
- Classification: Silver

History
- Opened: 1856; 170 years ago
Location
- Location within Piedmont Location within Northern Italy Location within Italy

Santhià railway station is the main station serving the comune of Santhià, in the Piedmont region, northwestern Italy. It is the junction of the Turin–Milan, Santhià–Biella and Santhià–Arona railways.

The station is currently managed by Rete Ferroviaria Italiana (RFI). Train services are operated by Trenitalia. Each of these companies is a subsidiary of Ferrovie dello Stato (FS), Italy's state-owned rail company.

== History ==
The station was opened from 1856, with Turin–Milan railway.

== Features ==
Five tracks of which are equipped with platforms, pass through the station.

== Train services ==
The station is served by the following services:

- Express services (Regionale Veloce) Turin - Chivasso – Santhià – Vercelli – Novara – Milan
- Regional services (Treno regionale) Turin - Chivasso - Santhià - Biella
- Regional services (Treno regionale) Chivasso - Santhià - Vercelli - Novara
- Regional services (Treno regionale) Santhià - Biella San Paolo

== Bus services ==
Since 17 June 2012 the train service to Arona has been suspended and replaced by a bus service.

== See also ==
- History of rail transport in Italy
- List of railway stations in Piedmont
- Rail transport in Italy
- Railway stations in Italy
