= Maria Adriana Prolo =

Italian historian

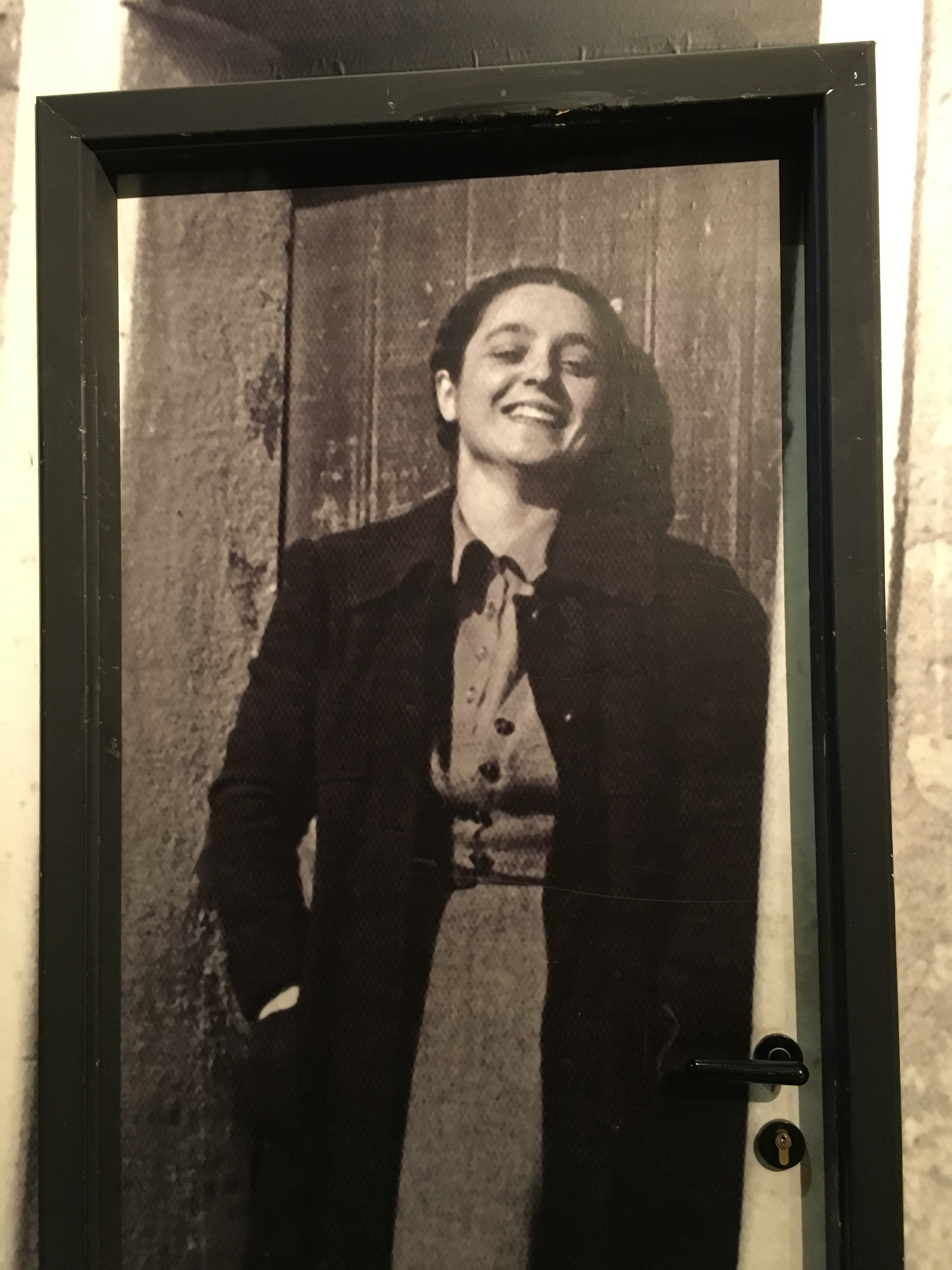
- Born: May 1908; Romagnano Sesia
- Died: February 20, 1991 (aged 82)
- Occupations: Librarian, film historian

Maria Adriana Prolo (1908–1991) was a historian of Italian film. She studied pioneering narratives in silent film, founded the National Museum of Cinema in Turin, and was an active member of International Federation of Film Archives. She was one of the first people, with Einar Lauritzen and Henri Langlois, to have the idea of founding a museum dedicated to film and its conservation.

== Biography ==
Born in Romagnano Sesia in May 1908, Prolo was the last of three sisters in a middle-class family with many cultural interests. She graduated early from the Facoltà di Magistero in Turin and began to work immediately at the Biblioteca Reale. There she began her research and attended courses in librarianship, archiving, and palaeography. Through her literary studies, she published Saggio sulla cultura femminile subalpina dalle origini al 1860 in 1937.

Her article "Torino cinematografica prima e durante la guerra" was published in 1938 by the journal Bianco e nero, and it increased her interest in cinema research. The article was dedicated to Turinese film production and the cinema periodicals of the time.

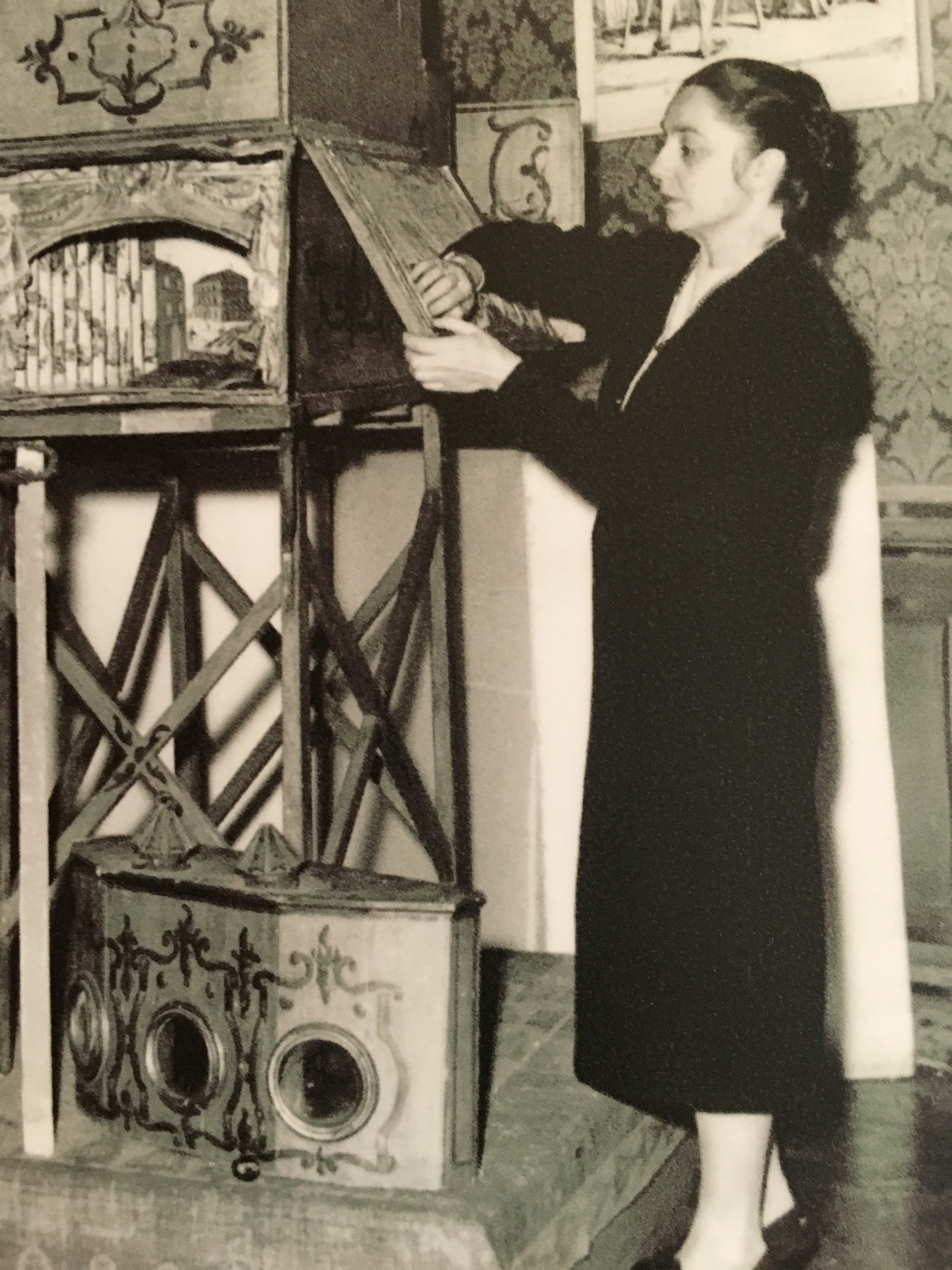

Her first idea to found a museum of cinema goes back to 1941, when she began to collect and conserve documents and materials of Turinese cinema. In 1953, the Associazione Culturale Museo del cinema, which proposed to "collect, conserve, and expose to the public all the materials that refer to the documentation and history of cultural, artistic, technical, and industrial activity of cinematography and photography."

Prolo died on February 20, 1991.

== Bibliography ==
- Abu-Fadil, Magda (August 17, 2017). "Turin Cinema Museum Projects Industry's Rich History". HuffPost.
- TROPE, ALISON (2001). "LE CINÉMA POUR LE CINÉMA: Making a Museum of the Moving Image". The Moving Image: The Journal of the Association of Moving Image Archivists. 1 (1): 29–67. ISSN 1532-3978. JSTOR 41167041.
- Robinson, David (2006). "Film Museums I Have Known and (Sometimes) Loved". Film History. 18 (3): 237–260. ISSN 0892-2160. JSTOR 3815479.
- "Il Museo del Cinema omaggia la fondatrice Maria Adriana Prolo a 30 anni dalla scomparsa" (in Italian). February 20, 2021.
- Bertetto, Paolo (October 1991). "In Memoriam: Maria Adriana Prolo (1908–1991) – ProQuest". Bulletin FIAF (in French) (43): 14–16.
