= Giuseppe Mazzola =

Italian painter (1748–1838)

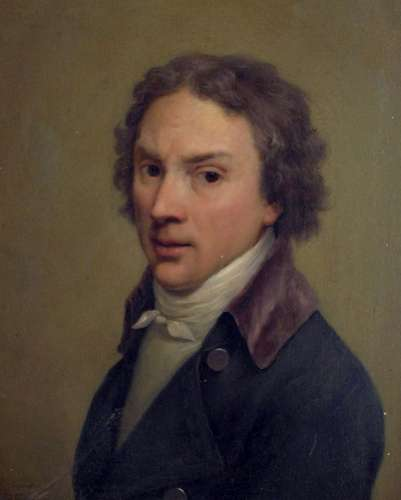
Self-portrait of Giuseppe Mazzola (1748–1838)

Giuseppe Mazzola (December 5, 1748 – November 24, 1838) was an Italian painter born in Valduggia.

== Biography ==
He studied briefly with Martin Knoller, then in the Academy of Parma, and later under Anton Raphael Mengs. He was the successor of Knoller as teacher of painting at the Brera Academy as well as conservator of the Pinacoteca. He lost his right hand at 40 years of age, and began painting with left hand. Among his works are an Assumption of the Virgin for the parish church of Grignasco; a St Phillip for the church of Biella; and a Resurrection for the Rotonda of Somasco.
