= National Museum of Cinema =

Italian motion picture museum

Coordinates: 45.0689°N 7.6931°E

- Museo Nazionale del Cinema
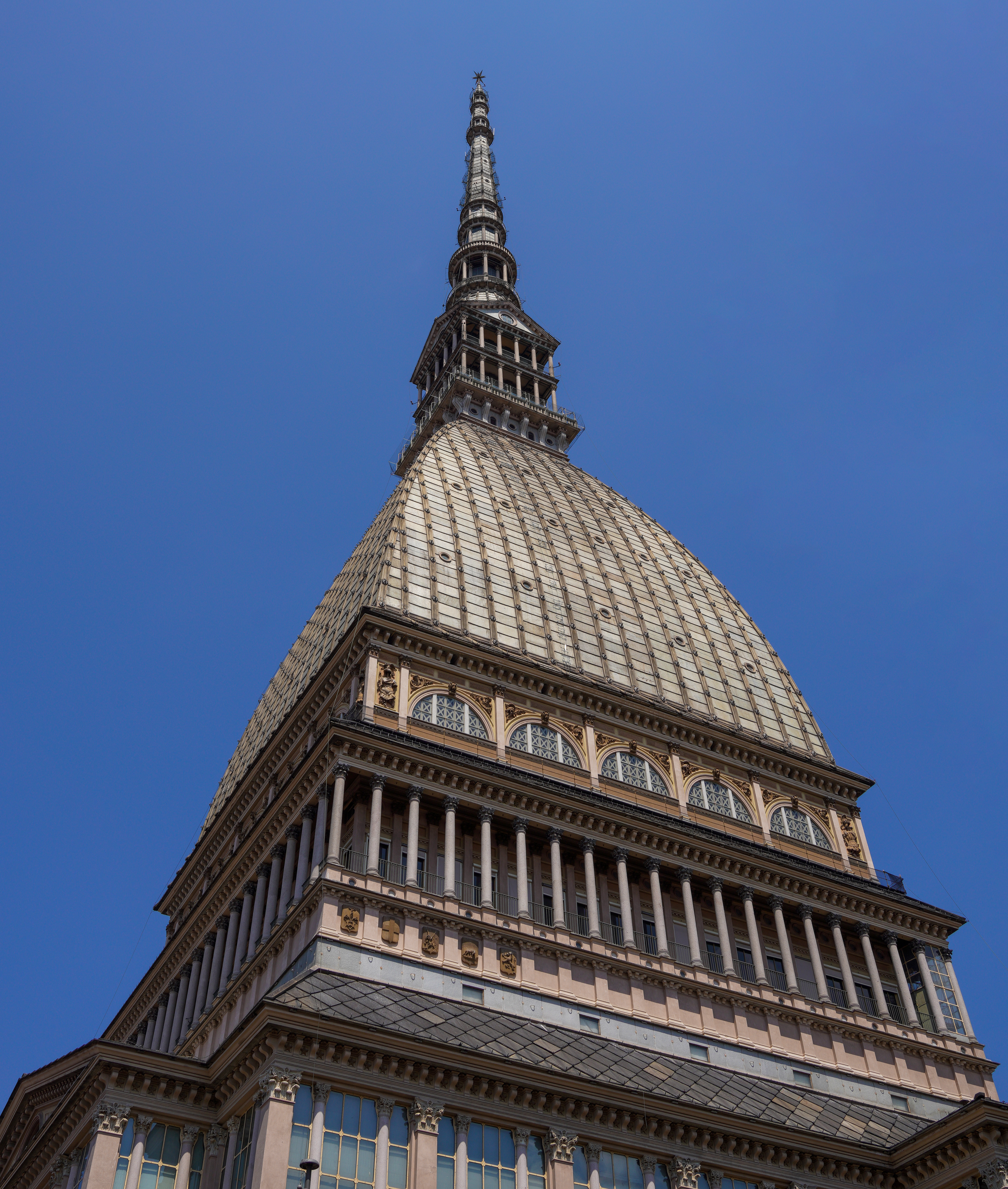
- Established: 1958
- Location: Mole Antonelliana, Via Montebello 20, - Turin, Italy
- Type: Motion picture
- Visitors: 674,243 (2019)
- Founder: Maria Adriana Prolo
- Website: Official website

The National Museum of Cinema (Italian: Museo Nazionale del Cinema) located in Turin, Italy, is a motion picture museum inside the Mole Antonelliana tower. It is operated by the Maria Adriana Prolo Foundation, and the core of its collection is the result of the work of the historian and collector Maria Adriana Prolo. It was housed in the Palazzo Chiablese.

In 2008, with 532,196 visitors, it reached the thirteenth place among the most visited Italian museums.

== Exhibition ==
The museum houses pre-cinematographic optical devices such as magic lanterns, earlier and current film technologies, stage items from early Italian movies and other memorabilia.

Along the exhibition path of about 35.000 square feet (3.200 m^{2}) on five levels, it is possible to visit some areas devoted to the different kinds of film crew, and in the main hall, fitted in the temple hall of the Mole (which was a building originally intended as a synagogue), a series of chapels representing several film genres.

The museum keeps a huge and growing collection of film posters, stocks, and a library: at present it includes 20,000 devices, paintings and printed artworks, more than 80,000 pictures, over 300,000 film posters, 12,000 movie reels and 26,000 books (as of February 2006). A movie screen located in the Massimo multiplex, near to the museum, is reserved to retrospectives and other museum initiatives. The museum hosts several film festivals, the major and most prestigious of them being the Torino Film Festival.

Inside the museum there is also a panoramic elevator (opened in 2000) with transparent glass walls, that cover its 75 meters ride in 59 seconds, in the single open space span of the building, without middle floors, up to the "small temple" which gives a 360 degrees panoramic view of the city. It is the museum with the biggest vertical extension of the world.

== Gallery ==
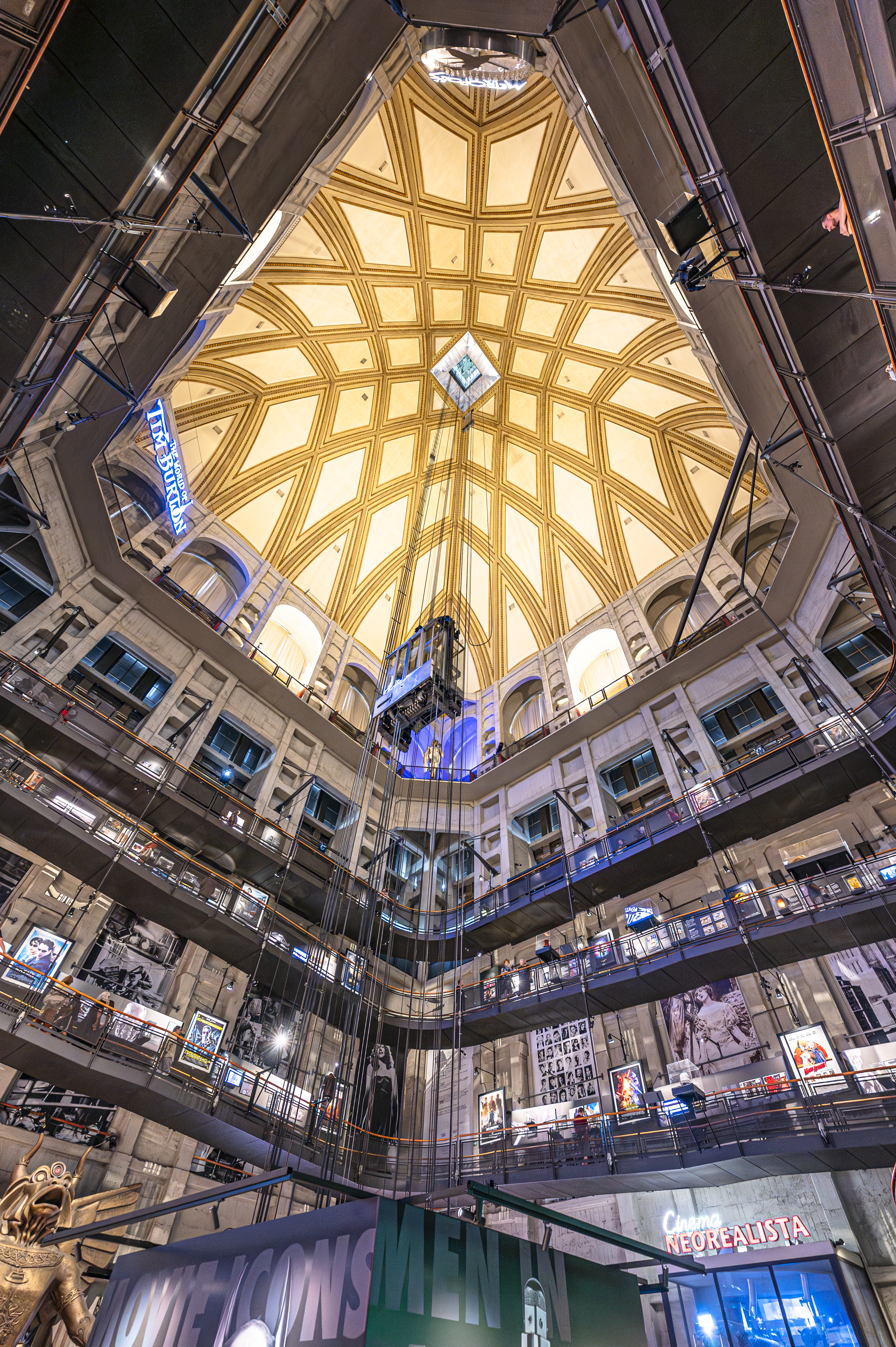
Interior view of the Mole Antonelliana with the panoramic elevator

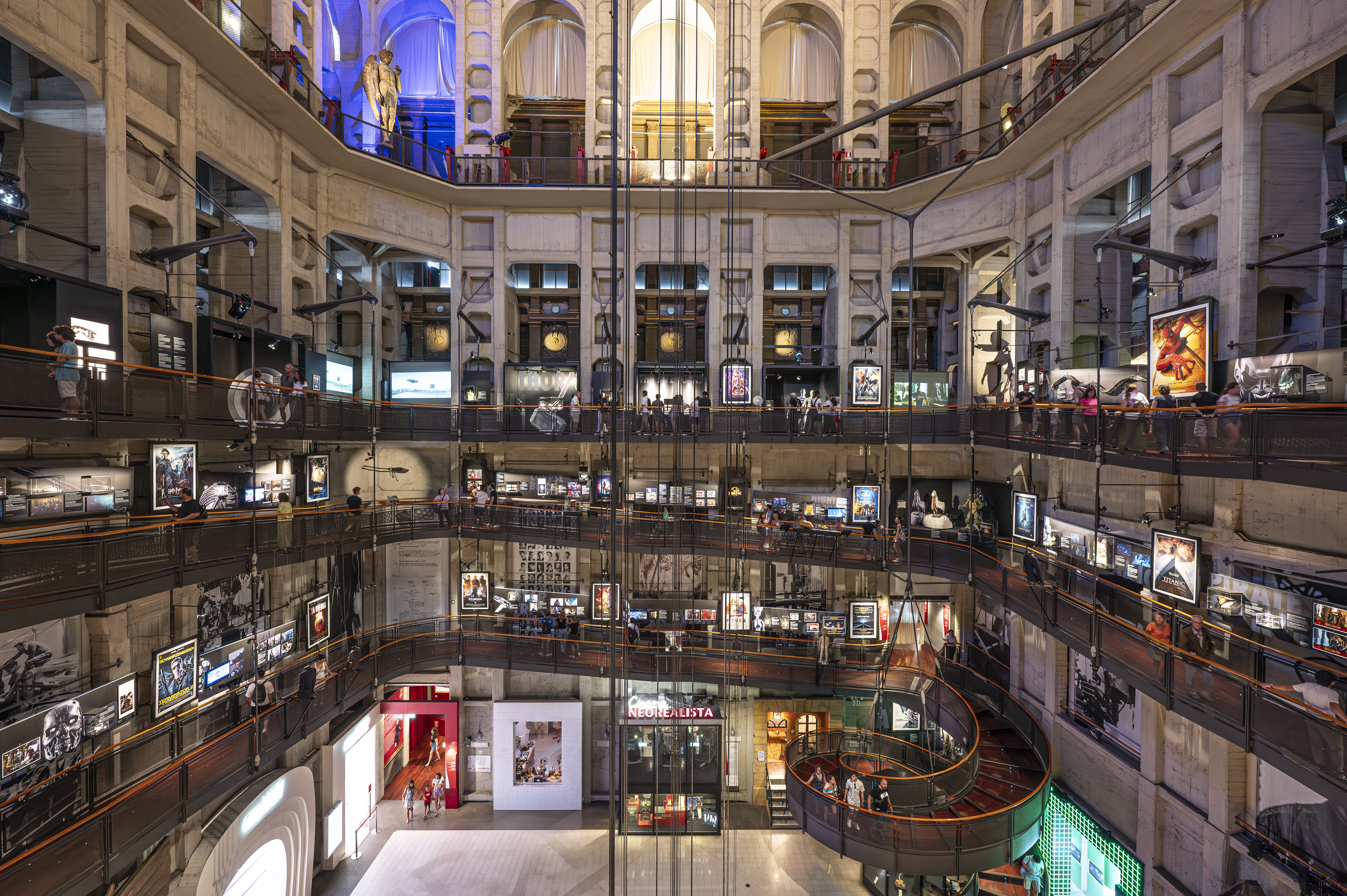
Rotunda

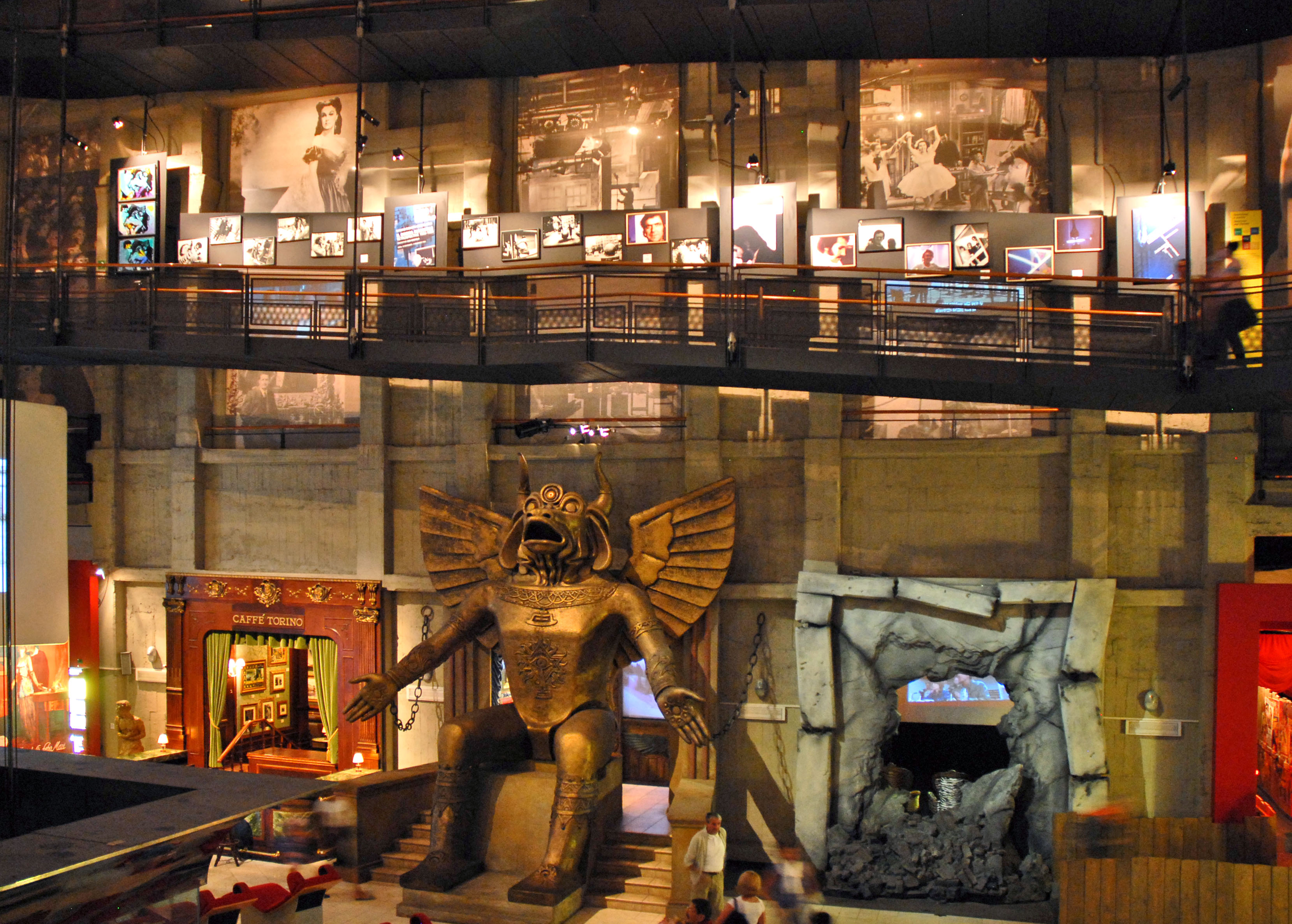
Statue of Moloch from the film "Cabiria" from Giovanni Pastrone

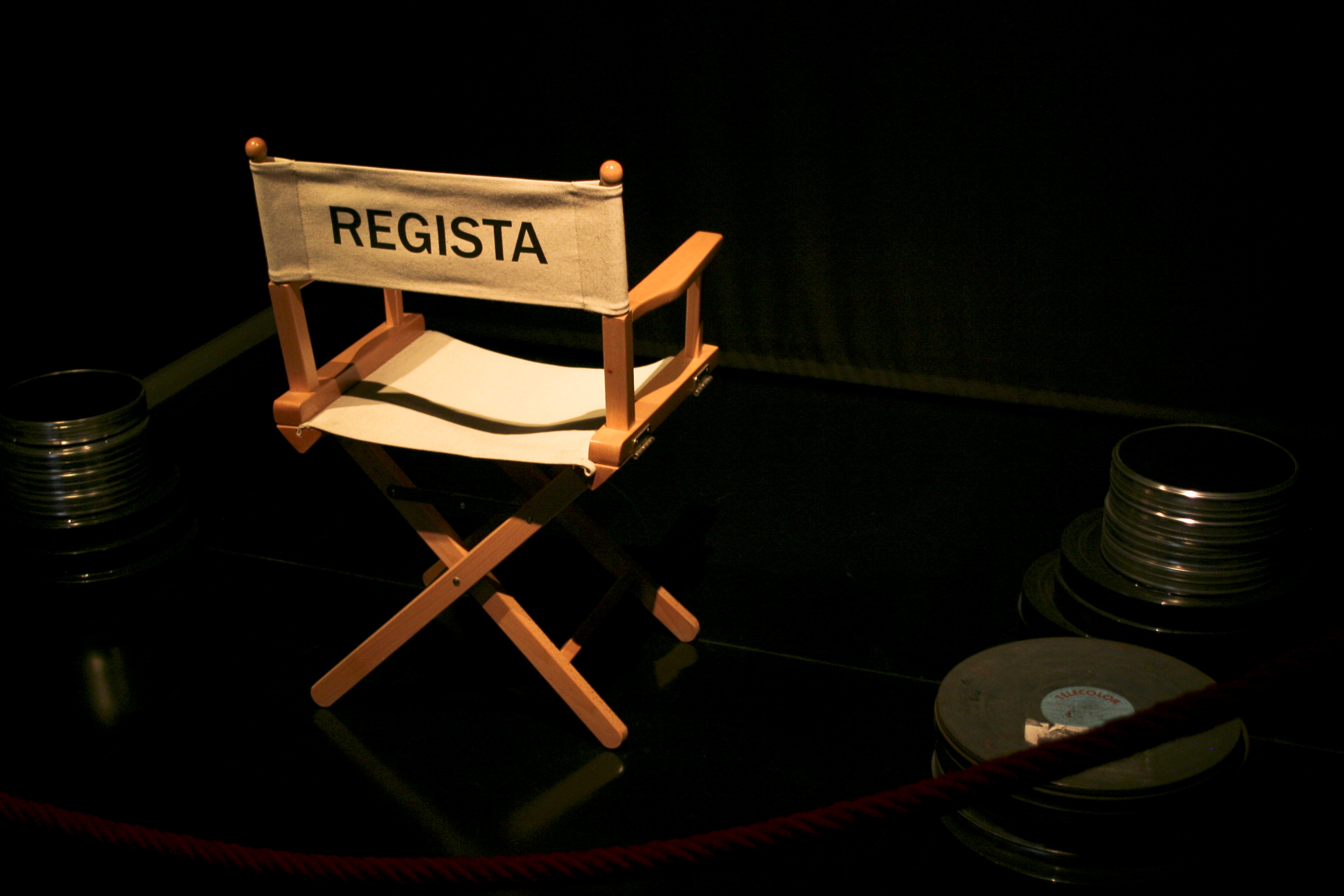
Director's chair

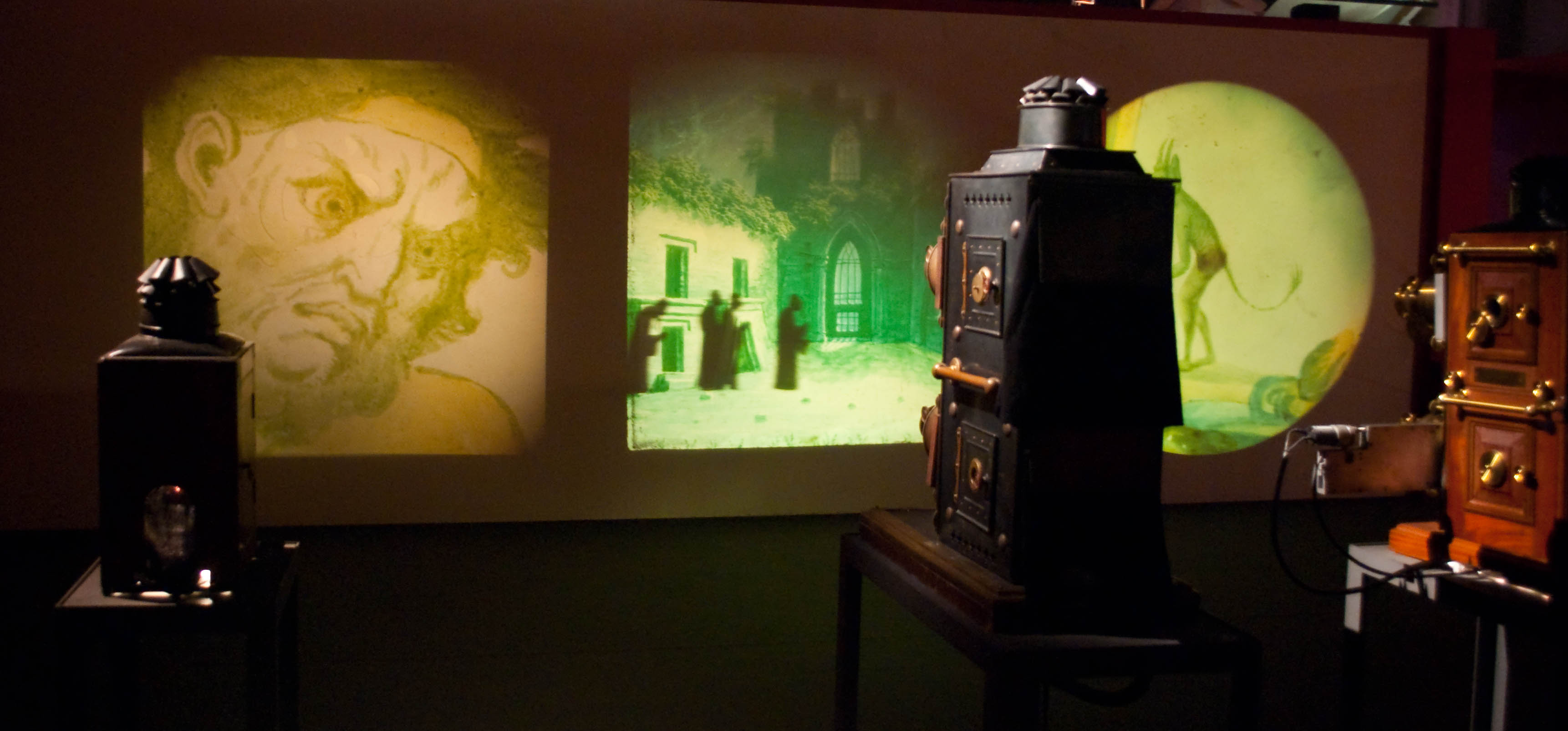

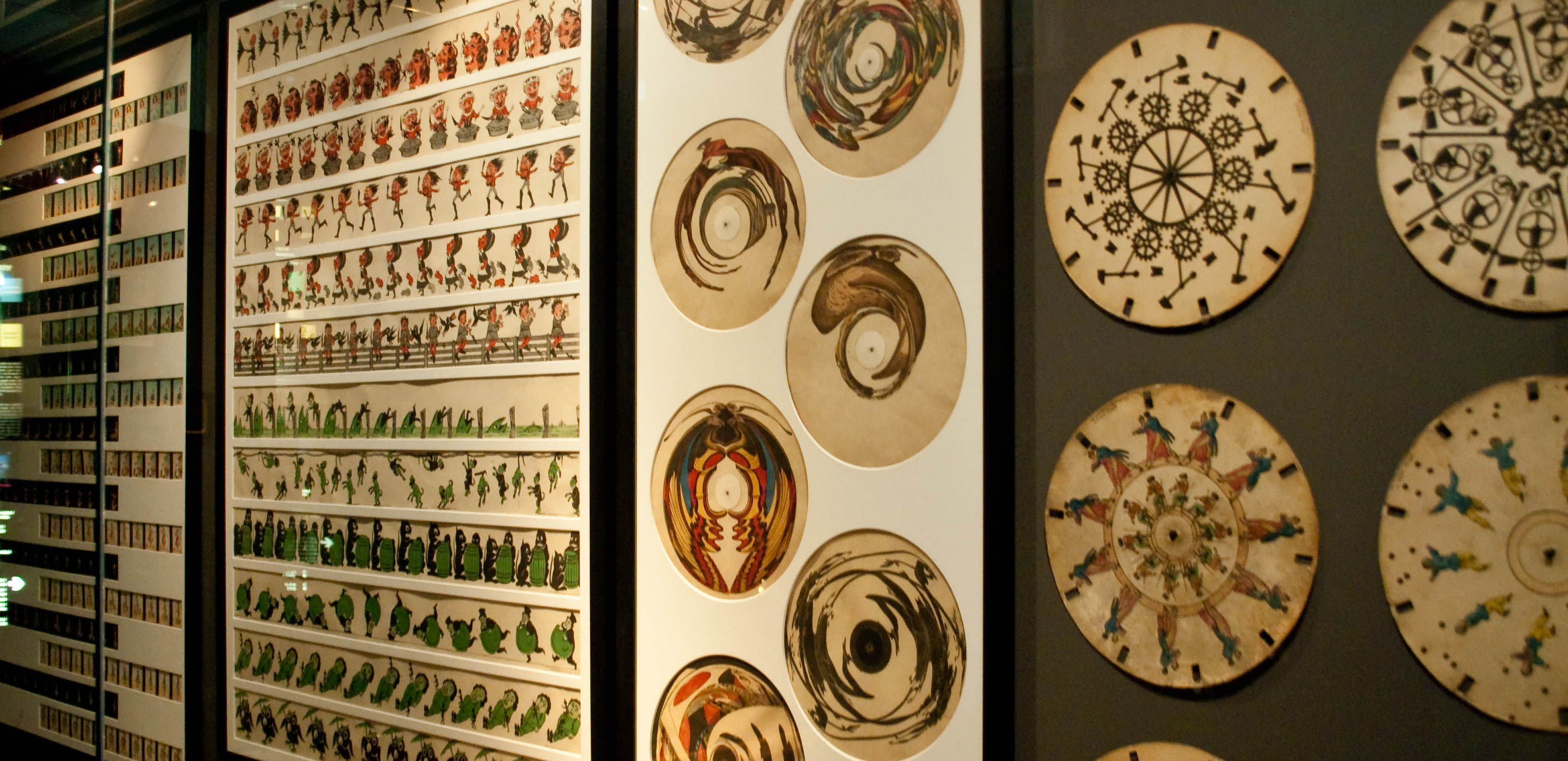

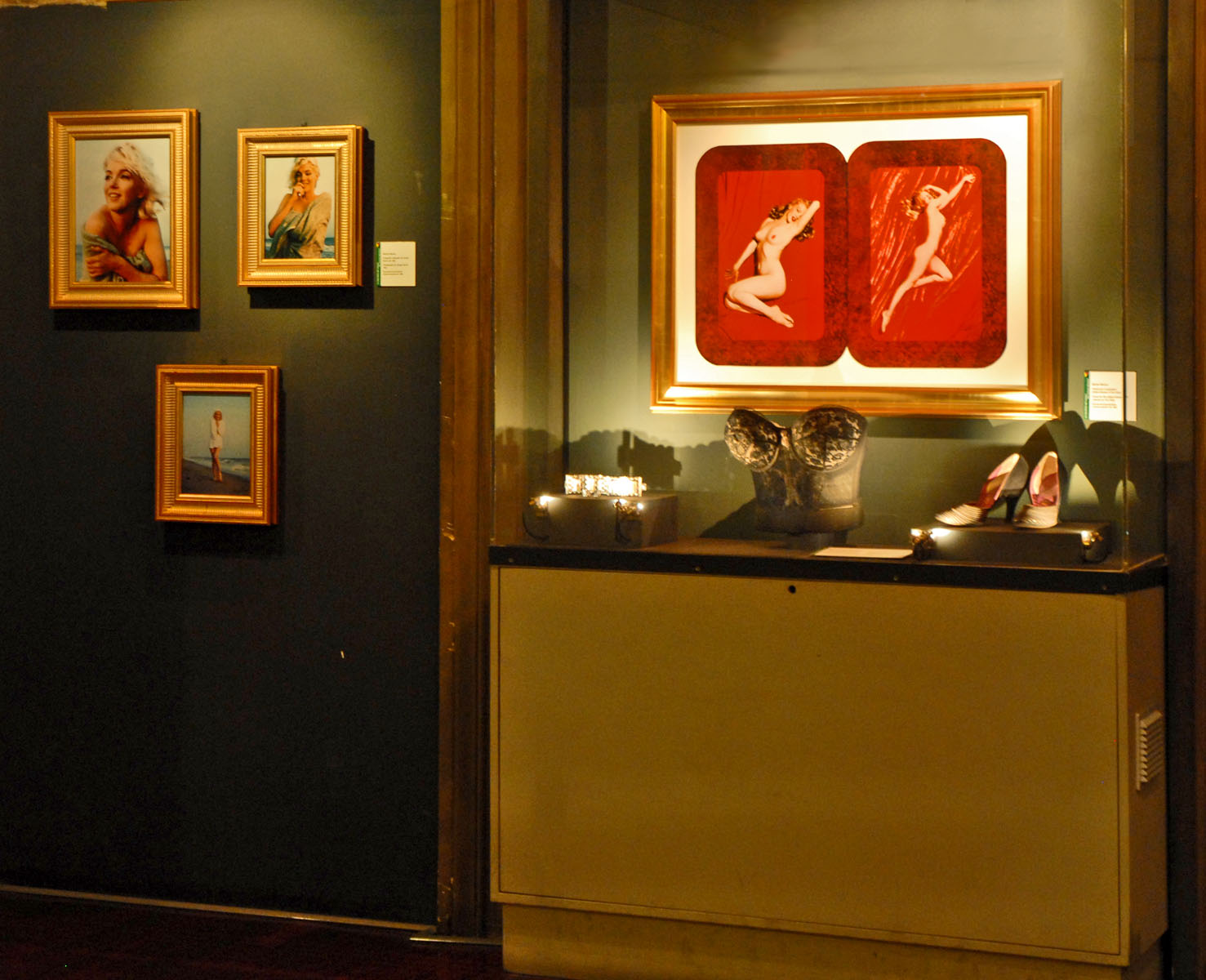
Marilyn Monroe's photos and objects

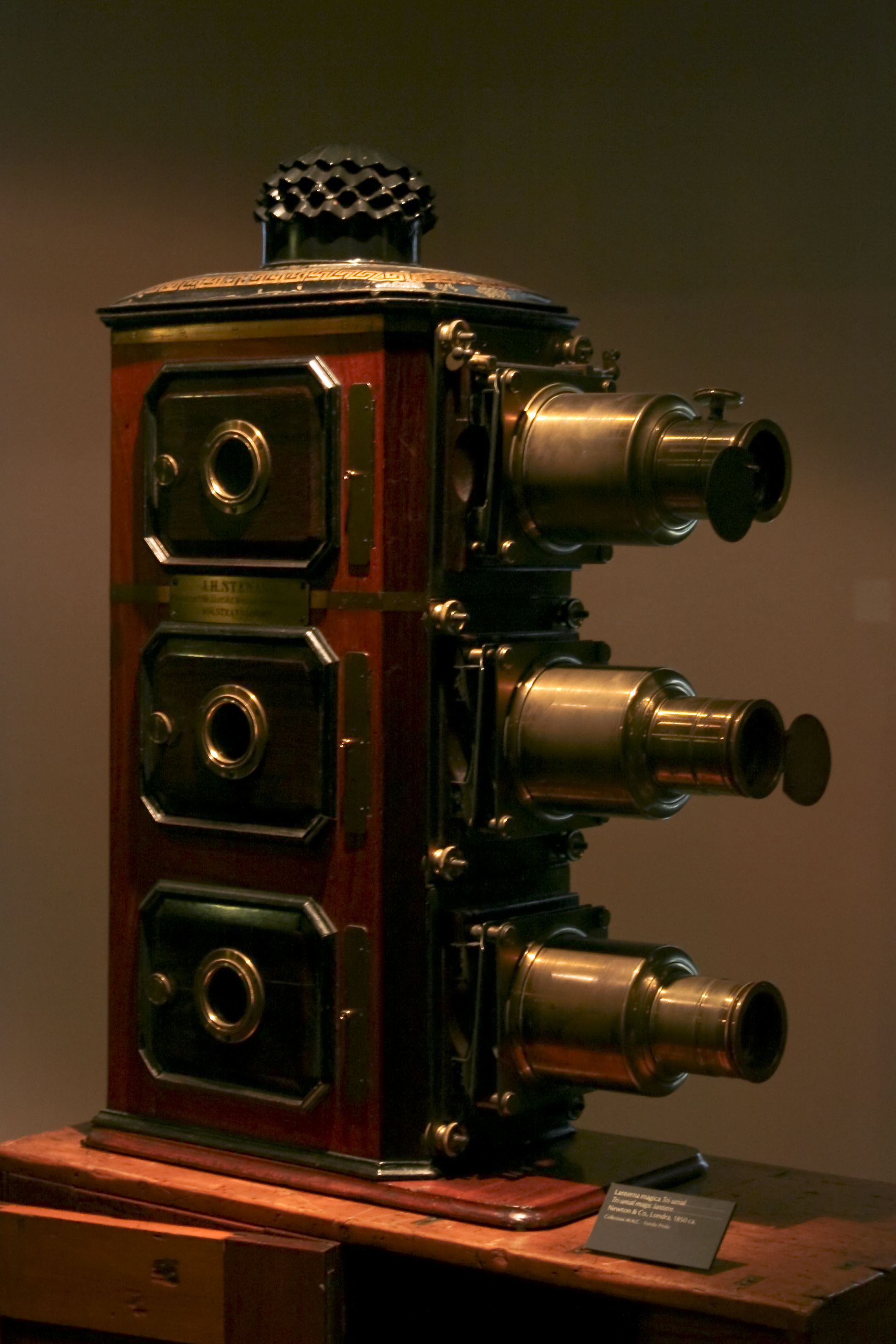
Magic lantern

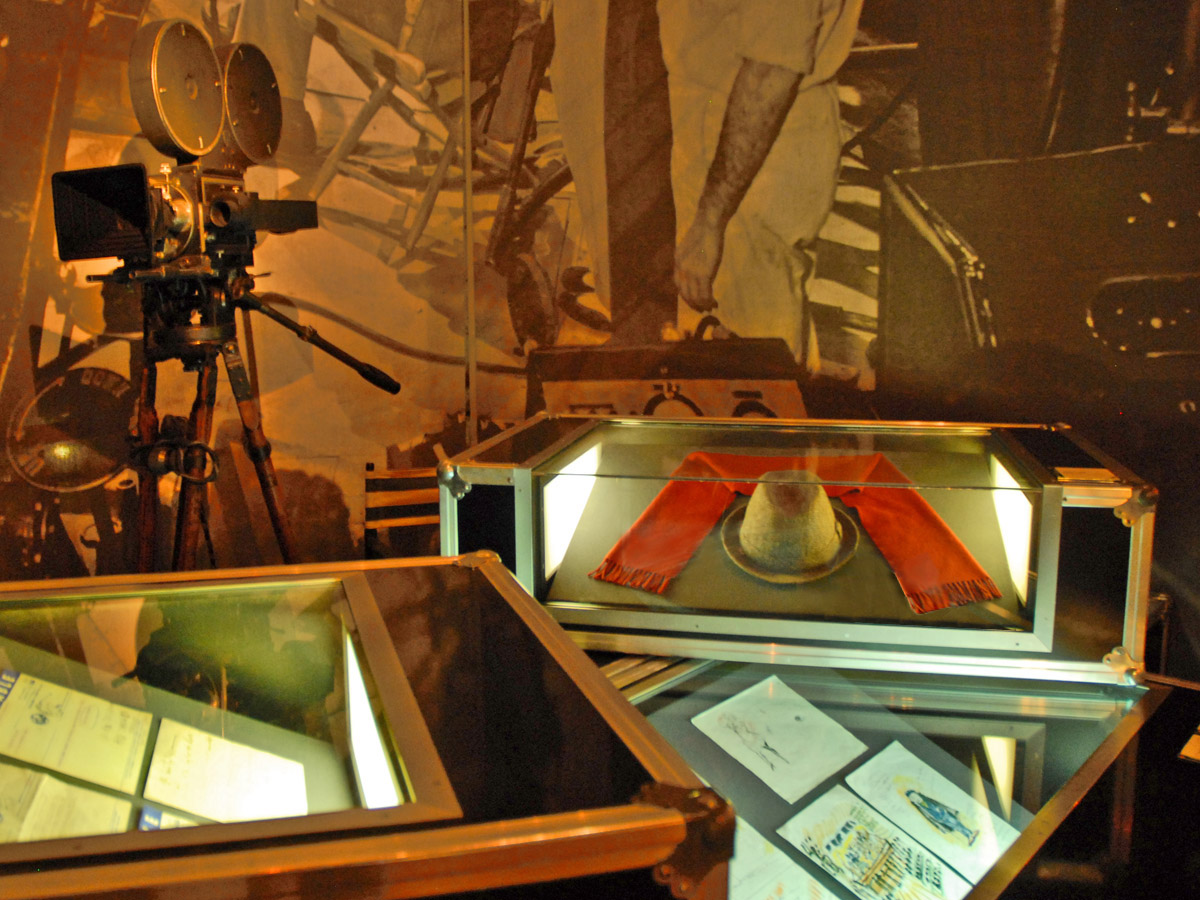
Federico Fellini's hat, red scarf, drawings and letters

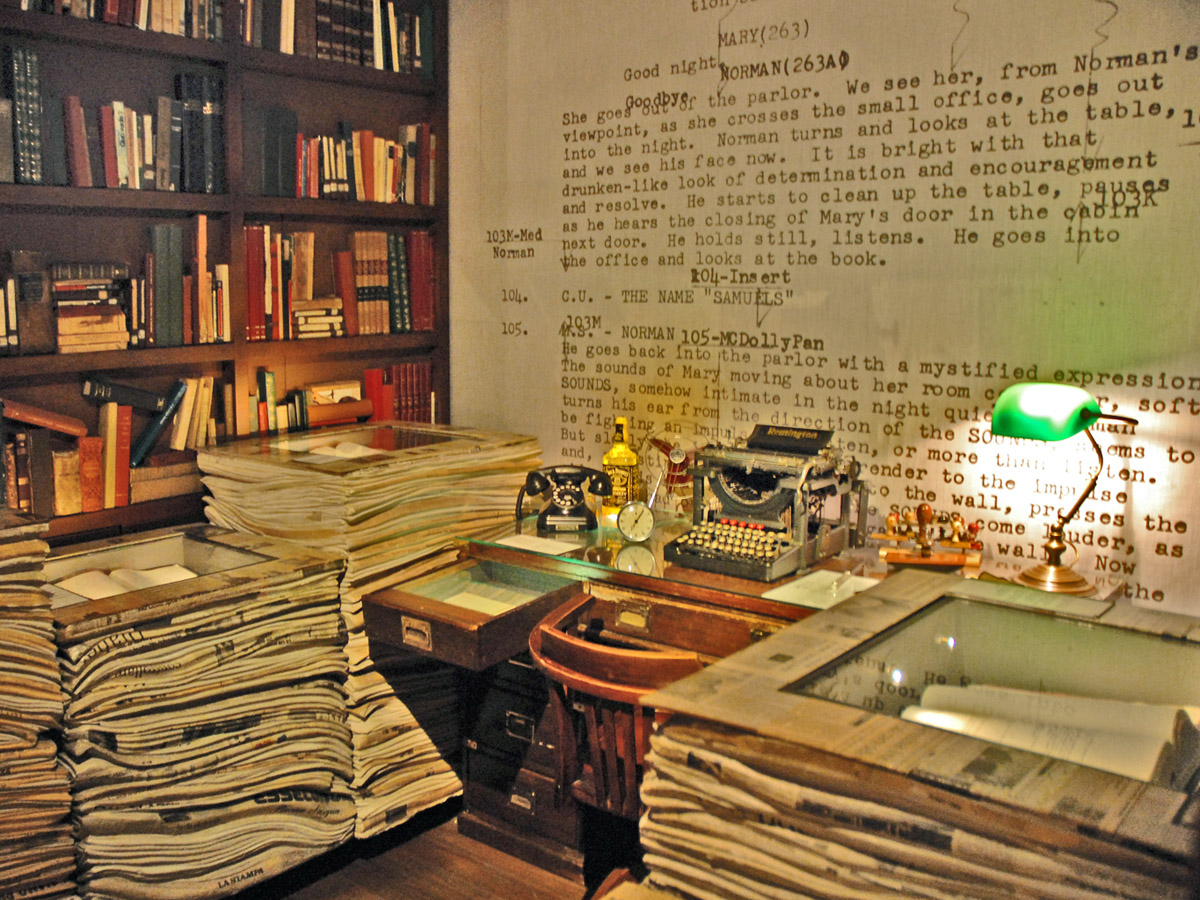
Space scenario in honor of Woody Allen

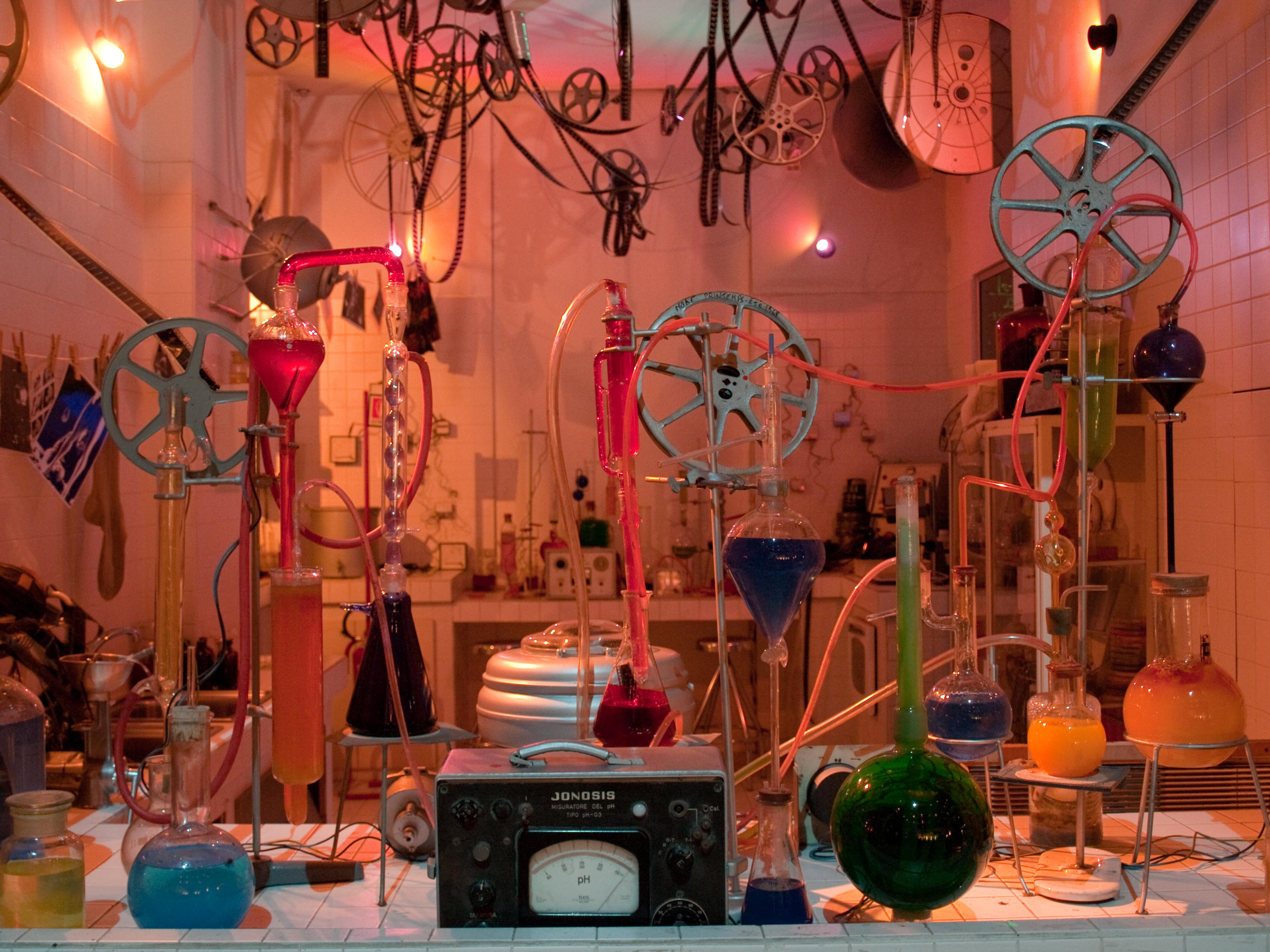
Red lab

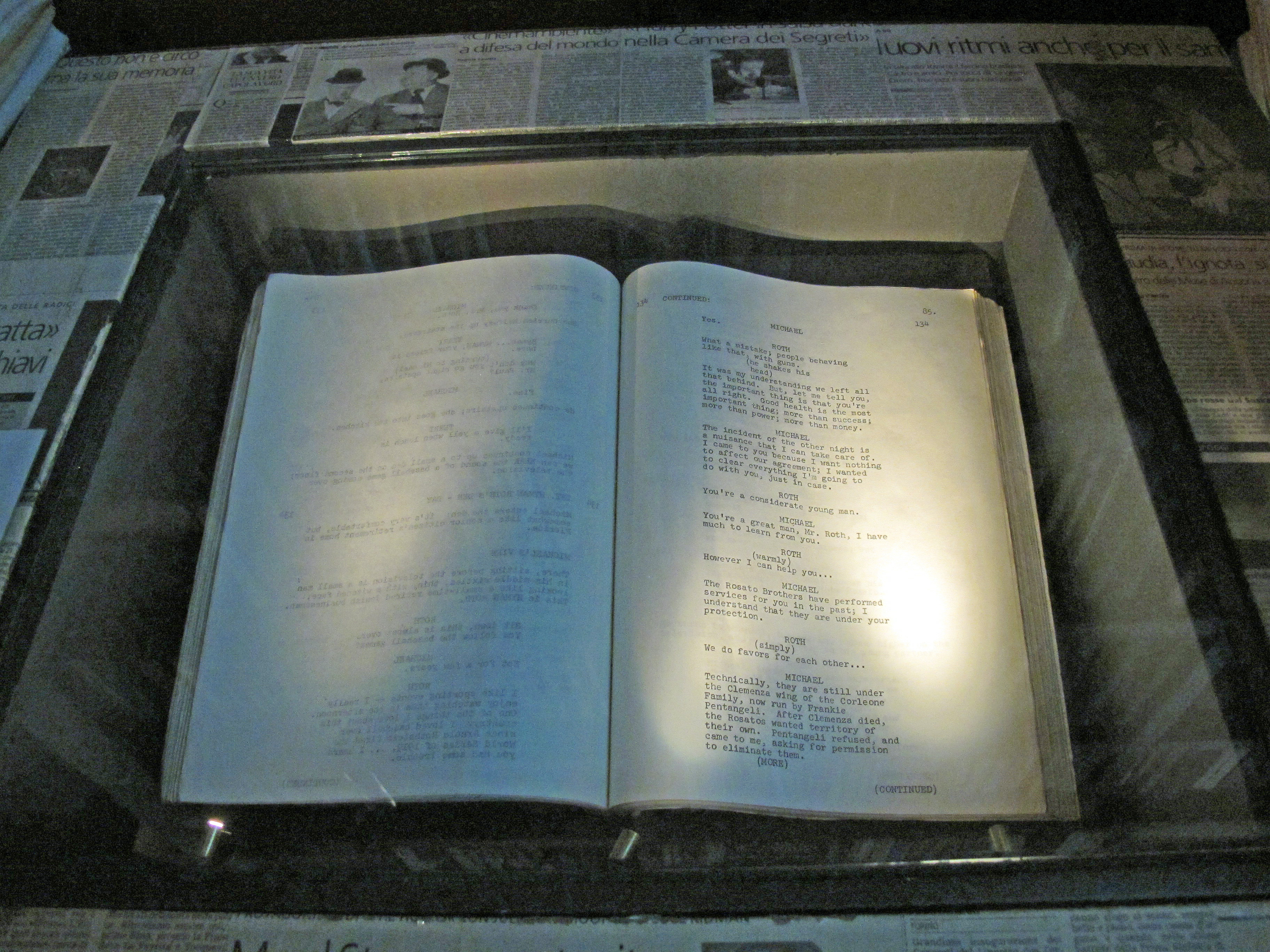
The Godfather Part II screenplay

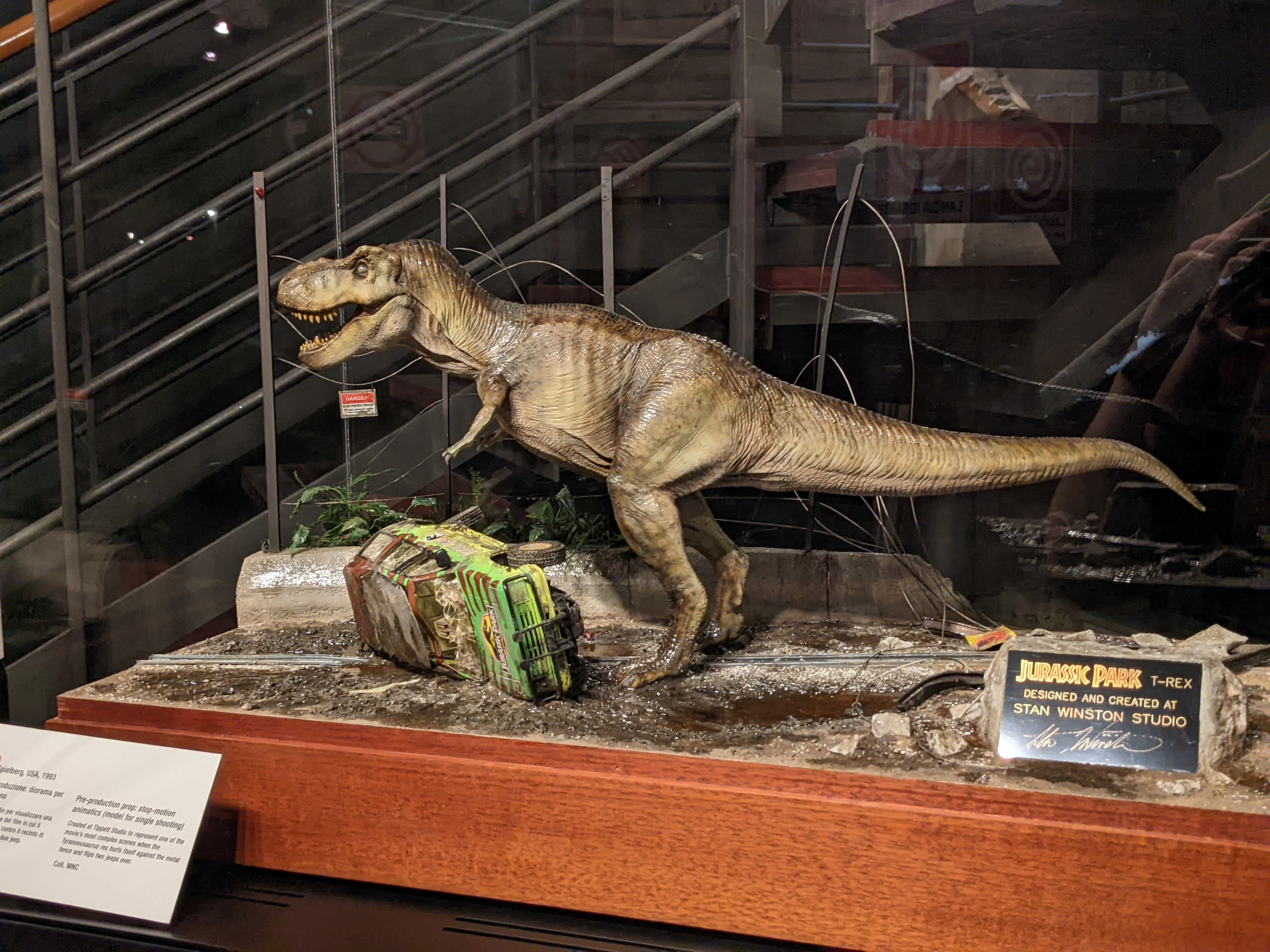
Jurassic Park pre-production stop-motion diorama by Tippett Studio

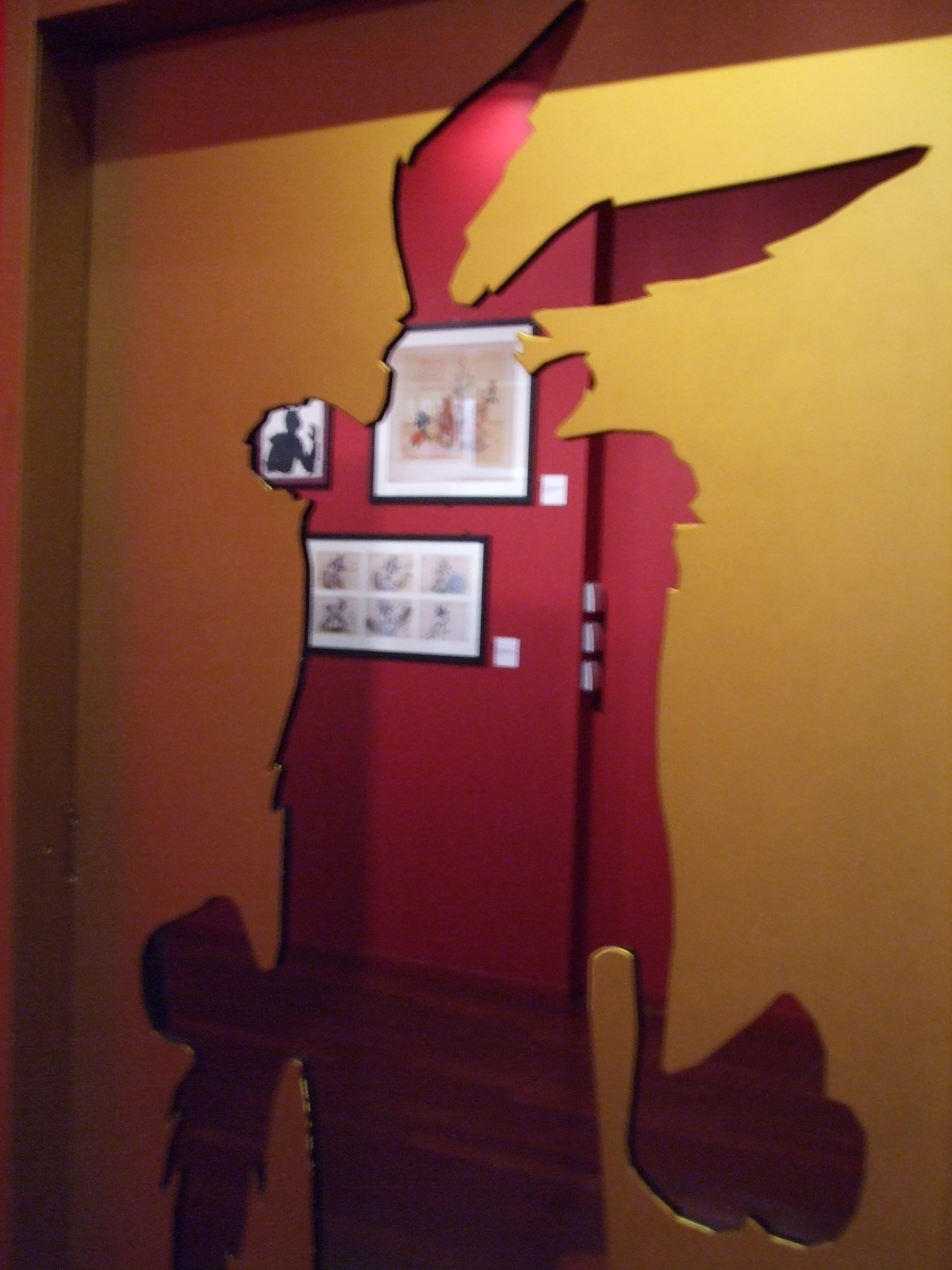
Wile E. Coyote

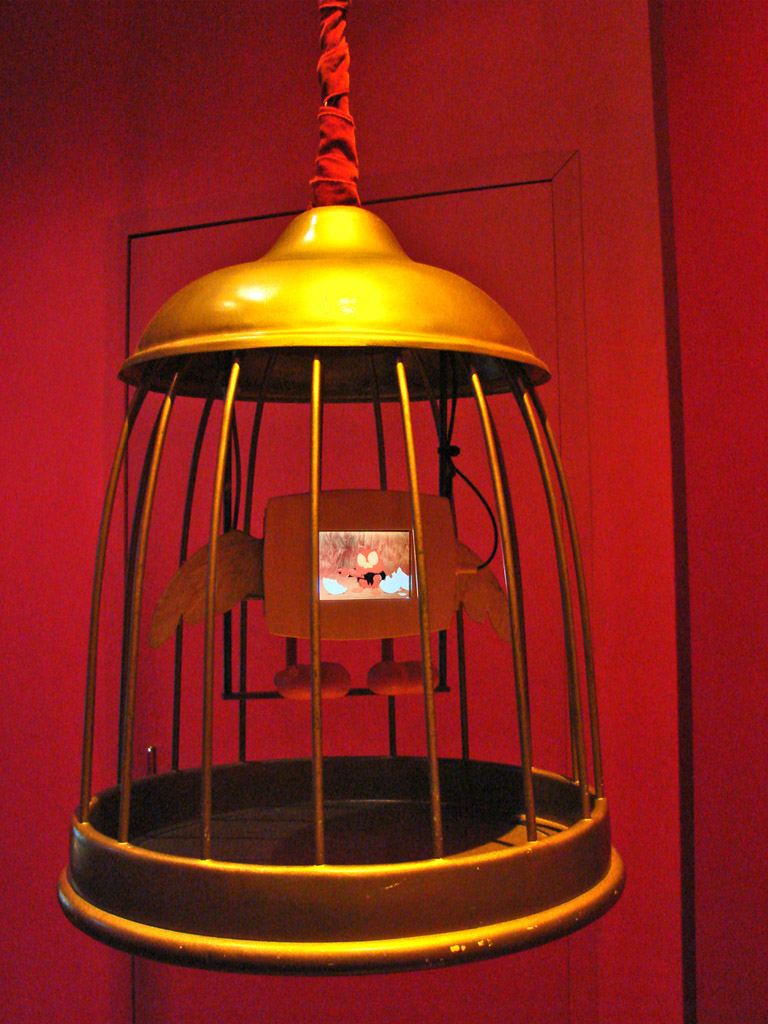
Tweety's cage

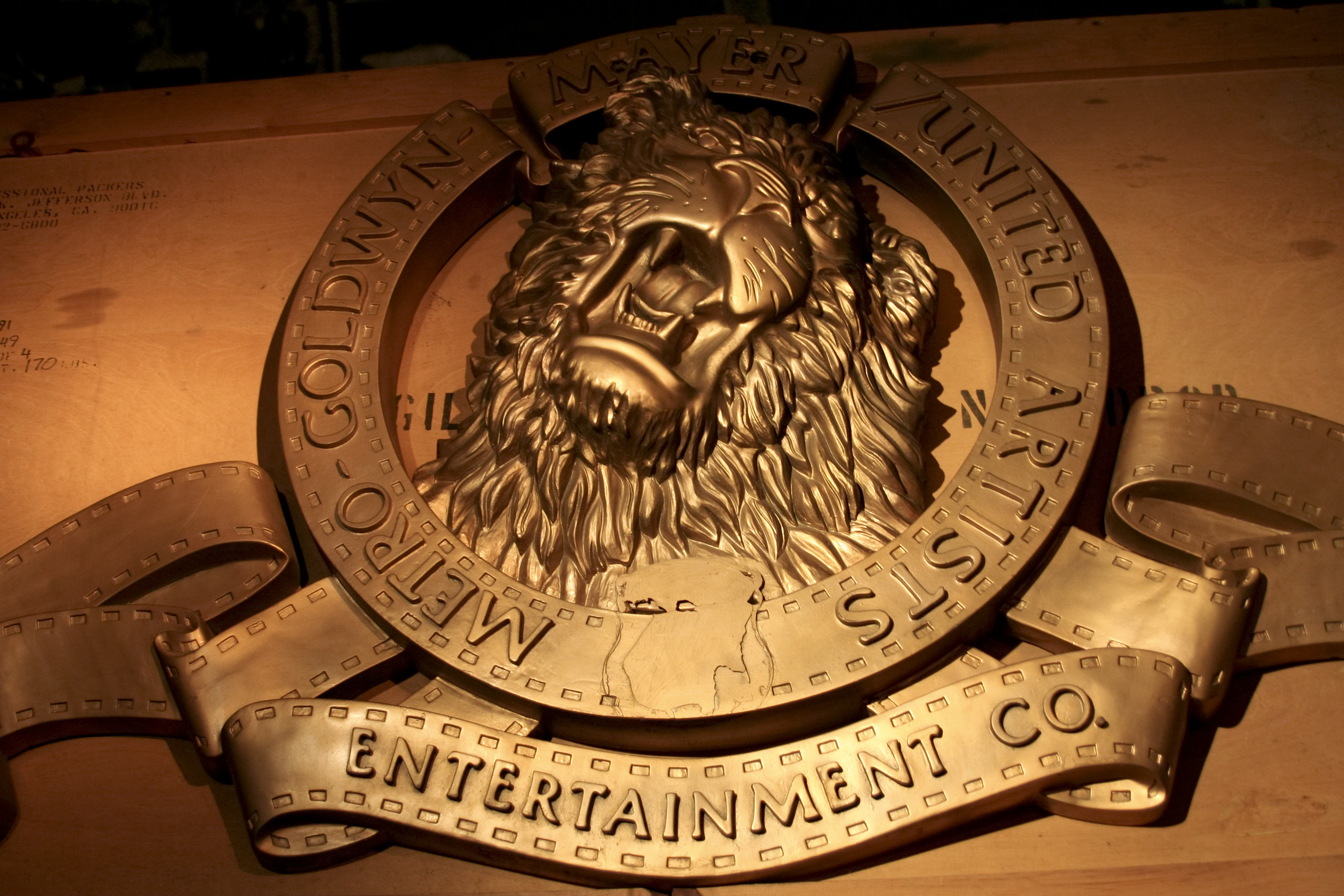
MGM logo

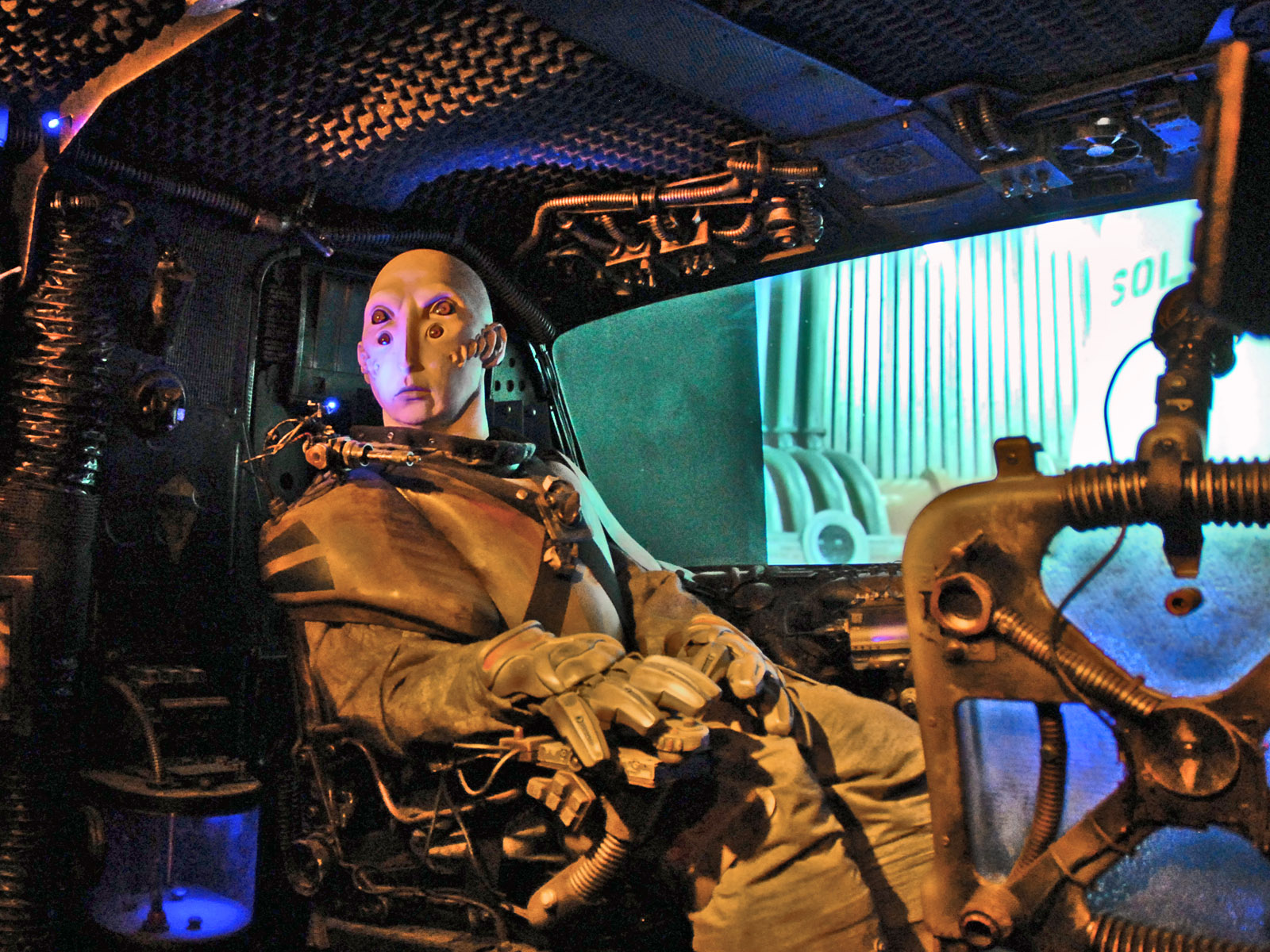

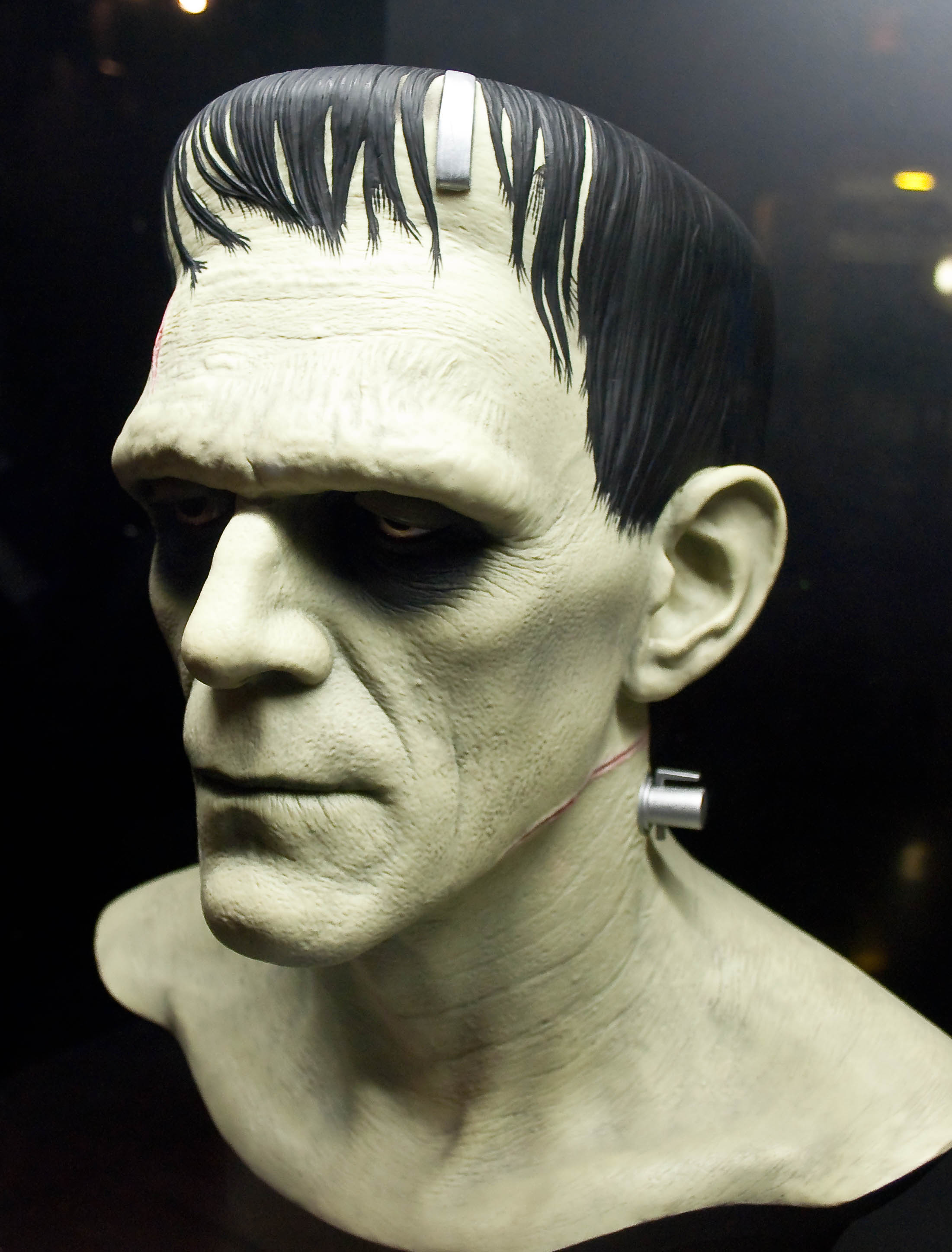
Boris Karloff's bust as the 1930s Frankenstein's monster

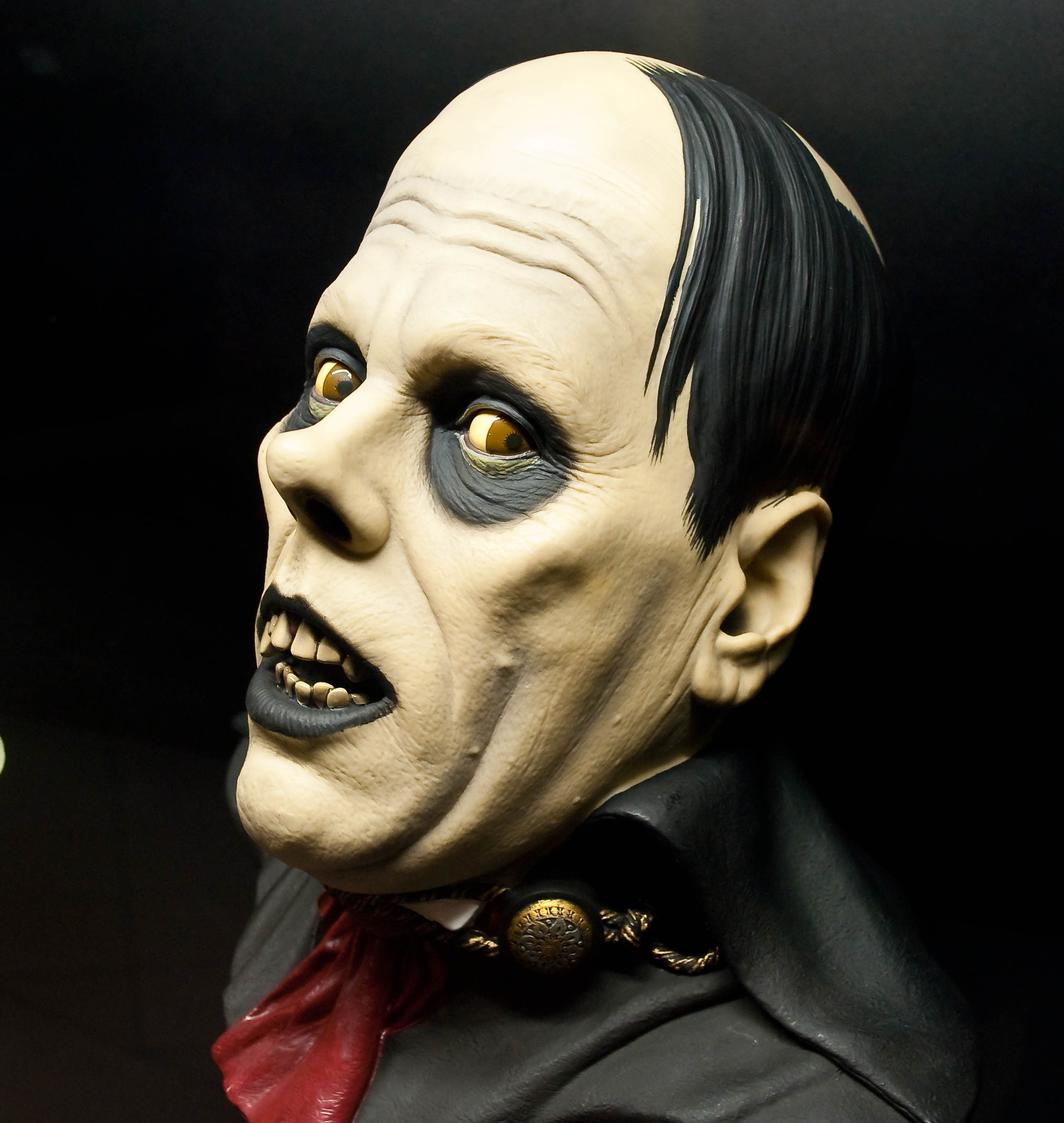
Lon Chaney Sr.'s bust as the 1920s Erik (The Phantom of the Opera)

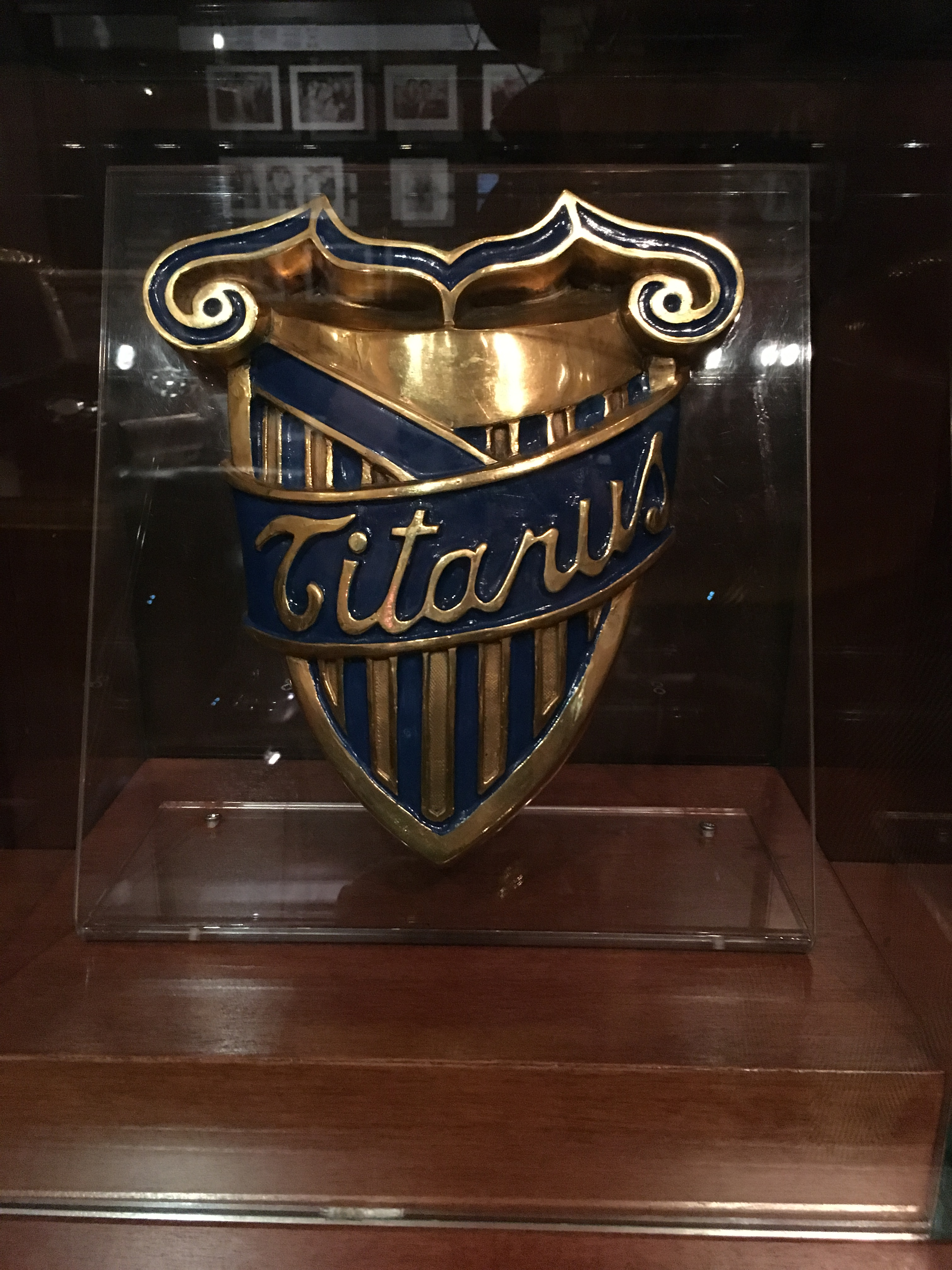
Titanus logo

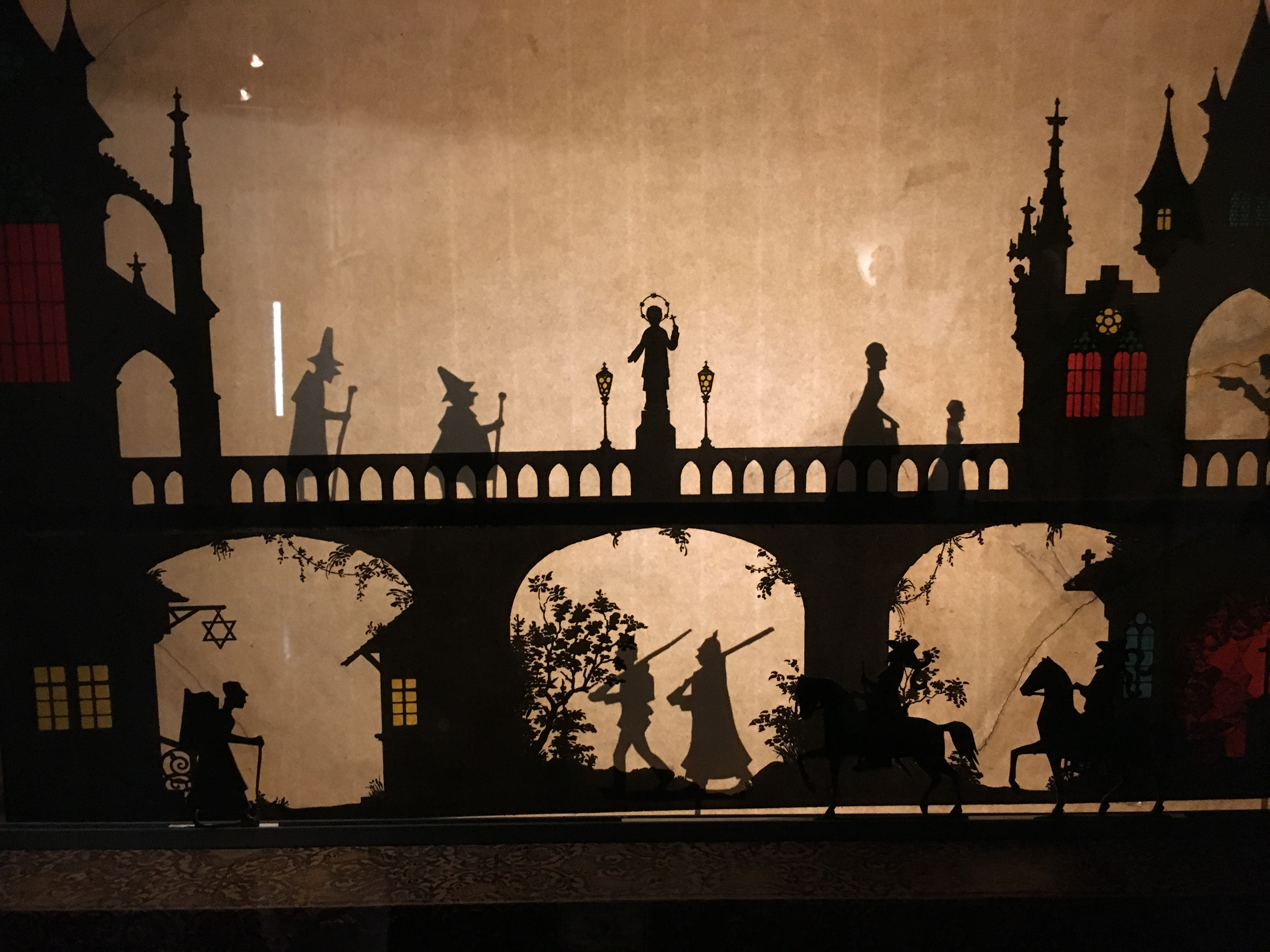
Shadow Play

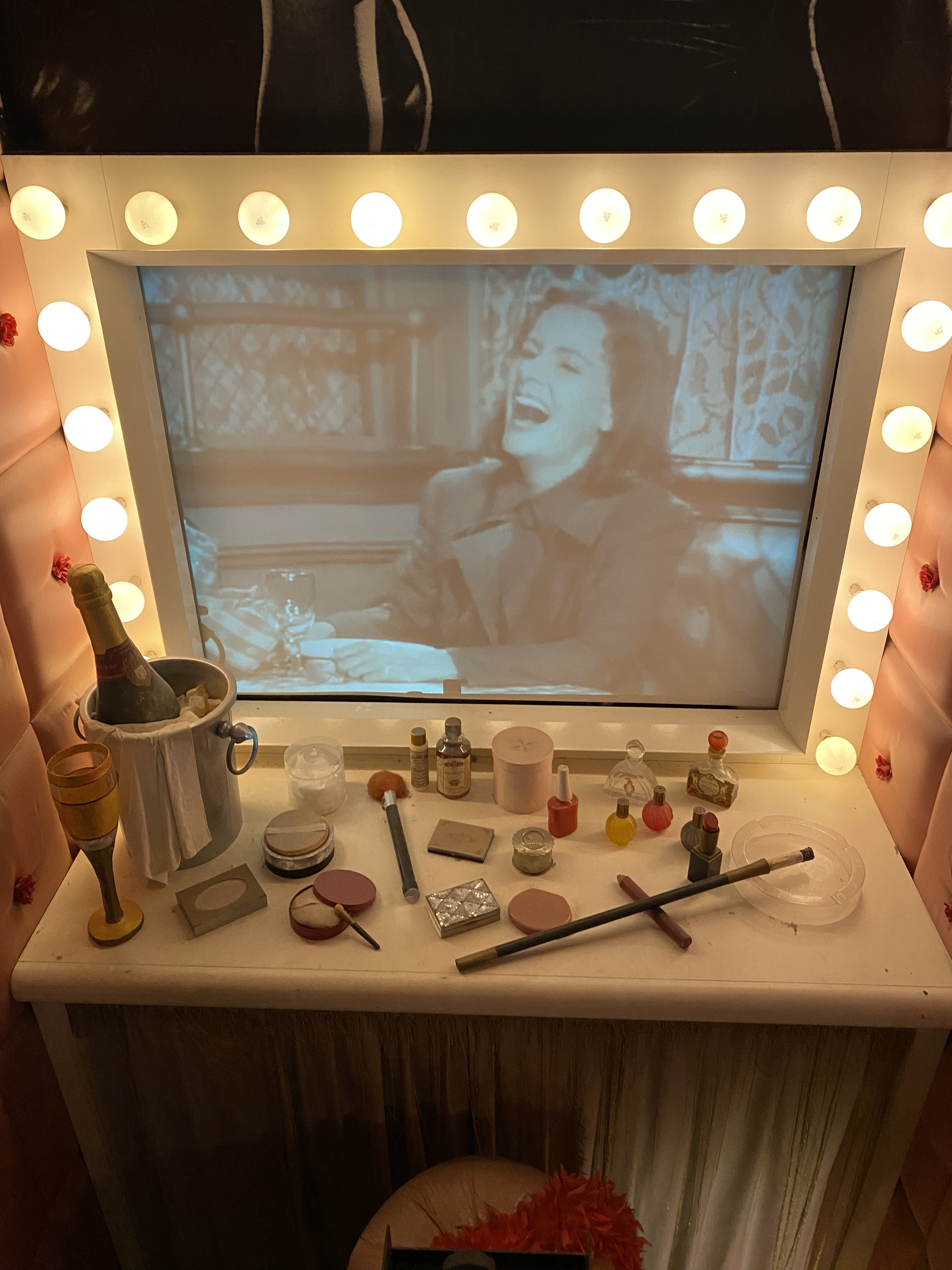
Larger than life vanity table display
