= Prato Sesia =

- Comune
- Comune di Prato Sesia
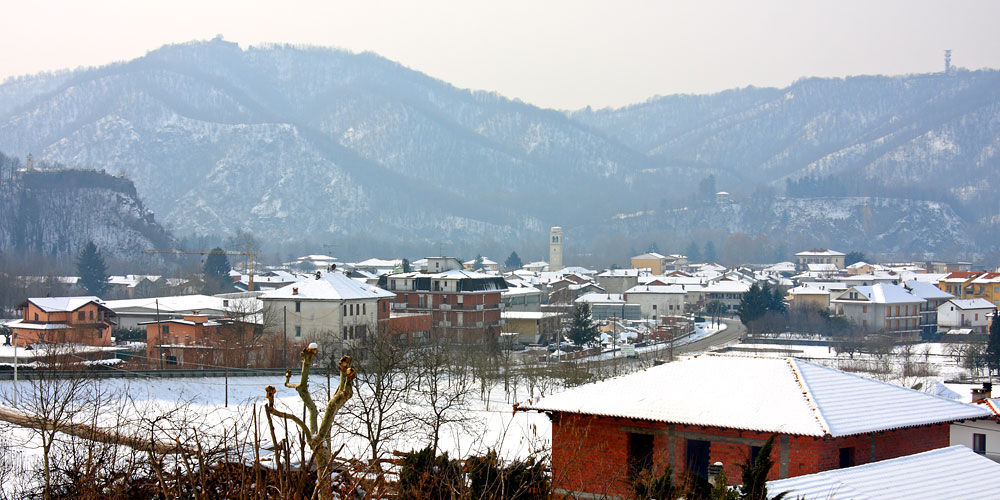
- View of Prato Sesia

- Location within Italy Location within Piedmont
- Coordinates: 45°39′N 8°23′E
- Country: Italy
- Region: Piedmont
- Province: Novara (NO)

Government
  - Mayor: Tiana Nicoloso

Area
  - Total: 12.3 km^{2} (4.7 sq mi)
- Elevation: 275 m (902 ft)

Population (Dec. 2004)
  - Total: 1,961
  - Density: 159/km^{2} (413/sq mi)
- Demonym: Pratesi
- Time zone: UTC+1 (CET)
  - Summer (DST): UTC+2 (CEST)
- Postal code: 28077
- Dialing code: 0163
- Website: Official website

Prato Sesia is a comune (municipality) in the Province of Novara in the Italian region Piedmont, located about 80 kilometres (50 mi) northeast of Turin and about 30 kilometres (19 mi) northwest of Novara.

Prato Sesia borders the following municipalities: Boca, Cavallirio, Grignasco, Romagnano Sesia, and Serravalle Sesia.

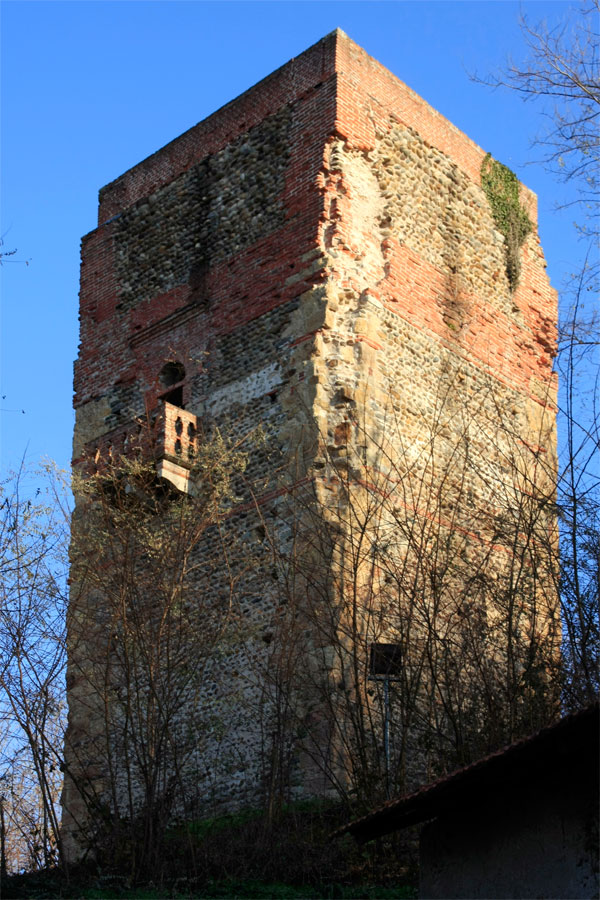
Medieval tower
