= Cavallirio =

- Comune
- Comune di Cavallirio
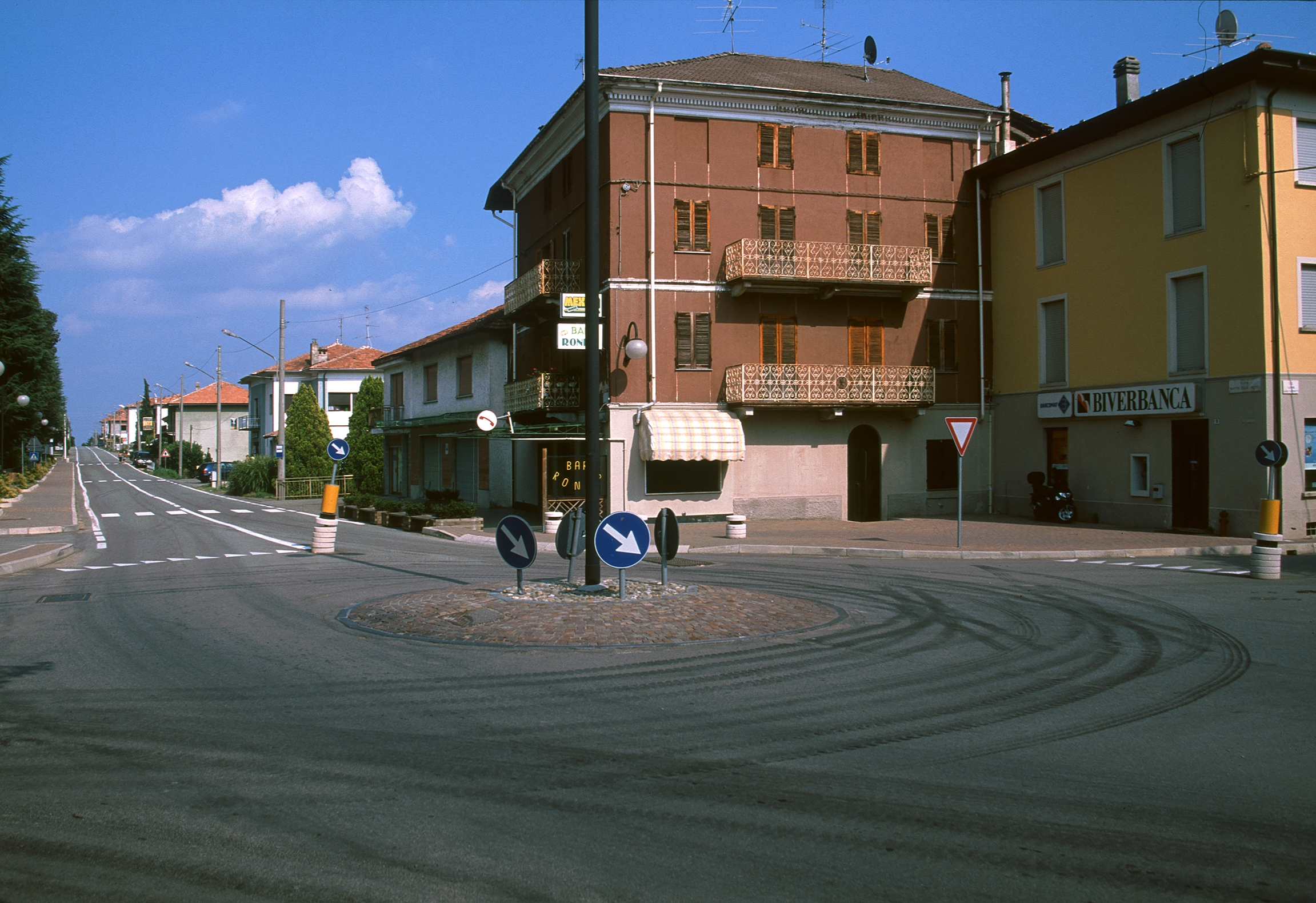
- View of Cavallirio

- Coat of arms

- Location within Italy Location within Piedmont
- Coordinates: 45°33′N 8°23′E
- Country: Italy
- Region: Piedmont
- Province: Novara (NO)
- Frazioni: Stoccada, Polera, Villa, Piatè, Suloro, Cademarco

Government
  - Mayor: Vito D'Aguanno

Area
  - Total: 8.1 km^{2} (3.1 sq mi)
- Elevation: 367 m (1,204 ft)

Population (Dec. 2004)
  - Total: 1,254
  - Density: 150/km^{2} (400/sq mi)
- Demonym: Cavalliresi
- Time zone: UTC+1 (CET)
  - Summer (DST): UTC+2 (CEST)
- Postal code: 28010
- Dialing code: 0163
- Website: Official website

Cavallirio is a comune (municipality) in the Province of Novara in the Italian region Piedmont, located about 80 kilometres (50 mi) northeast of Turin and about 20 kilometres (12 mi) northwest of Novara.

Cavallirio borders the following municipalities: Boca, Cureggio, Fontaneto d'Agogna, Prato Sesia, and Romagnano Sesia.
