= Santa Maria Assunta, Grignasco =

Church building in Grignasco, Italy

Coordinates: 45°41′08″N 8°20′13″E

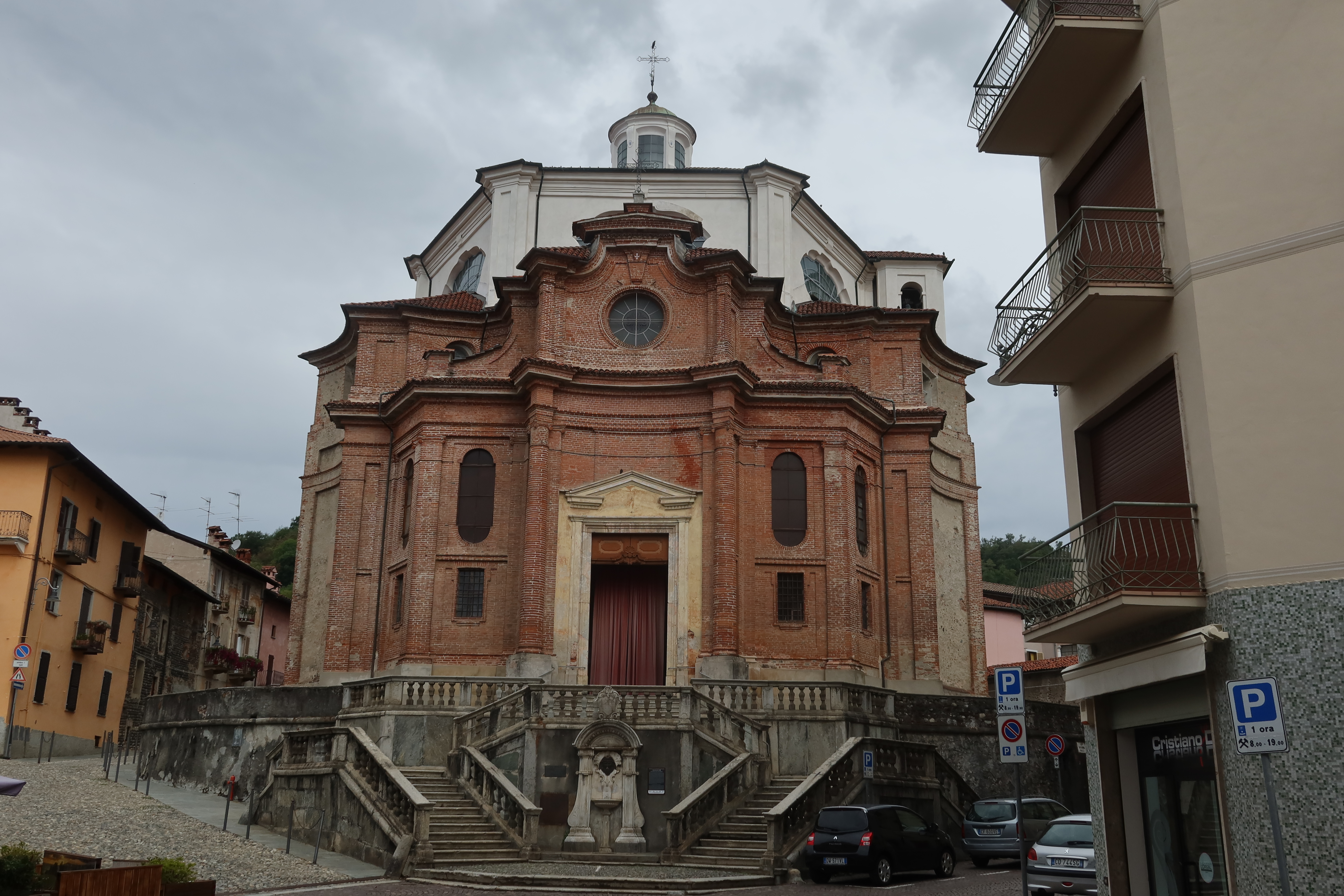
Facade of church

Santa Maria Assunta (St Mary of the Assumption) is a late-Baroque style, Roman Catholic parish church located in the town of Grignasco, in the Province of Novara in the region of Piedmont, Italy. The small parish church was designed by the Piedmontese architect Bernardo Vittone.

== History and description ==
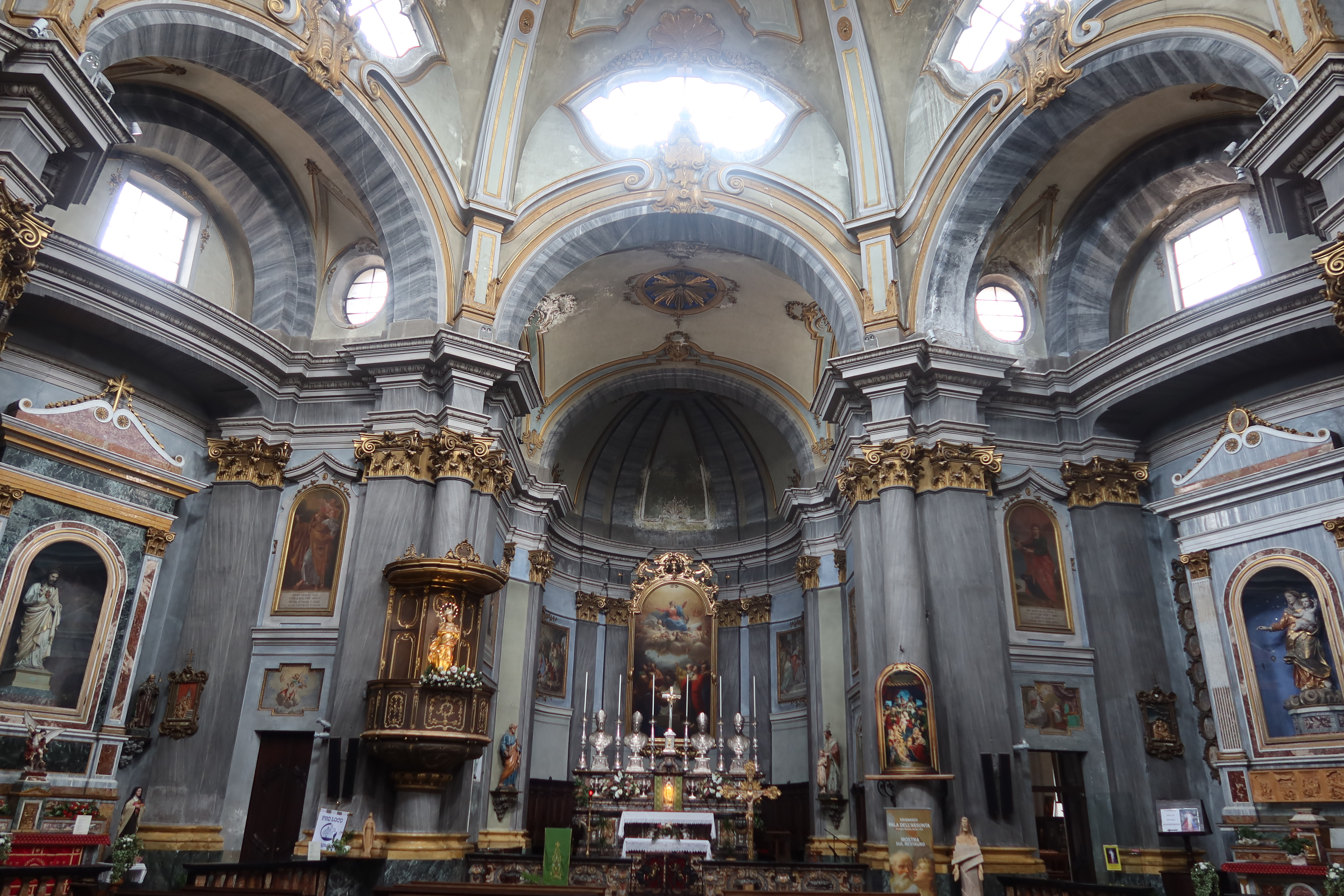
Interior of church

The church was erected starting in 1751 and completed in 1770. The church has a centralized plan. The interior stucco was completed by Francesco Pellegrino and Giovanni Battista Morazzone. The scenographic staircases with a fountain in front of the elaborate convex facade were designed by Vittone, but completed posthumously.

The interior has an altarpiece depicting the Assumption of the Virgin (circa 1782) attributed to Giuseppe Mazzola.
