= Grignasco =

- Comune
- Comune di Grignasco
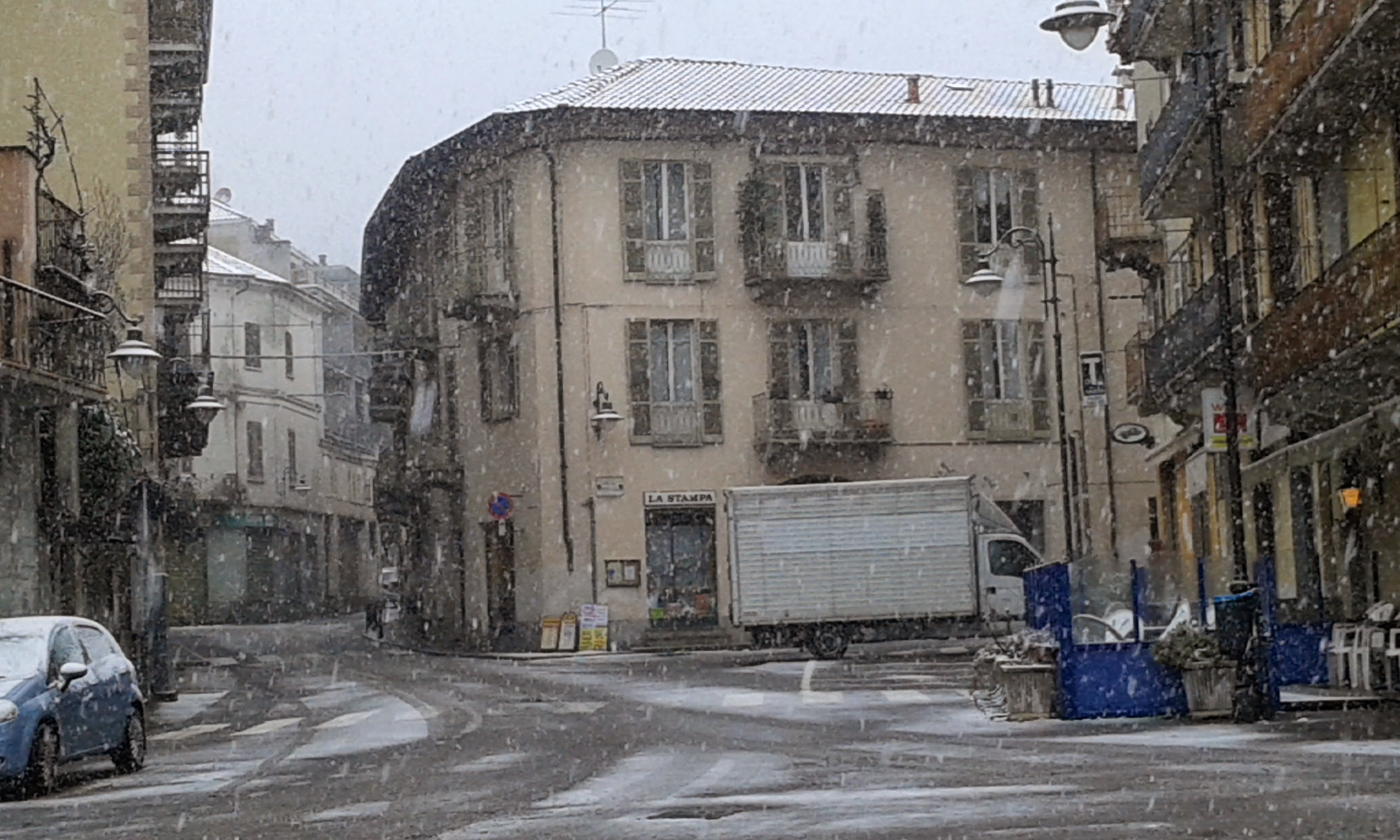
- View of Grignasco

- Location within Italy Location within Piedmont
- Coordinates: 45°41′N 8°20′E
- Country: Italy
- Region: Piedmont
- Province: Novara (NO)
- Frazioni: Ara, Bertolotto, Bovagliano, Ca' Marietta, Carola, Garodino, Pianaccia, Torchio, Sagliaschi, Isella

Government
  - Mayor: Katia Bui

Area
  - Total: 14.6 km^{2} (5.6 sq mi)
- Elevation: 322 m (1,056 ft)

Population (Dec. 2004)
  - Total: 4,803
  - Density: 329/km^{2} (852/sq mi)
- Demonym: Grignaschesi
- Time zone: UTC+1 (CET)
  - Summer (DST): UTC+2 (CEST)
- Postal code: 28075
- Dialing code: 0163
- Website: Official website

Grignasco is a comune (municipality) in the Province of Novara in the Italian region Piedmont, located about 80 kilometres (50 mi) northeast of Turin and about 35 kilometres (22 mi) northwest of Novara.

Grignasco borders the following municipalities: Boca, Borgosesia, Prato Sesia, Serravalle Sesia, and Valduggia.

== Twin towns ==
Grignasco is twinned with:

- Pont-Sainte-Maxence, France, since 1992

== See also ==
- Santa Maria Assunta, Grignasco
