= Cureggio =

- Comune
- Comune di Cureggio
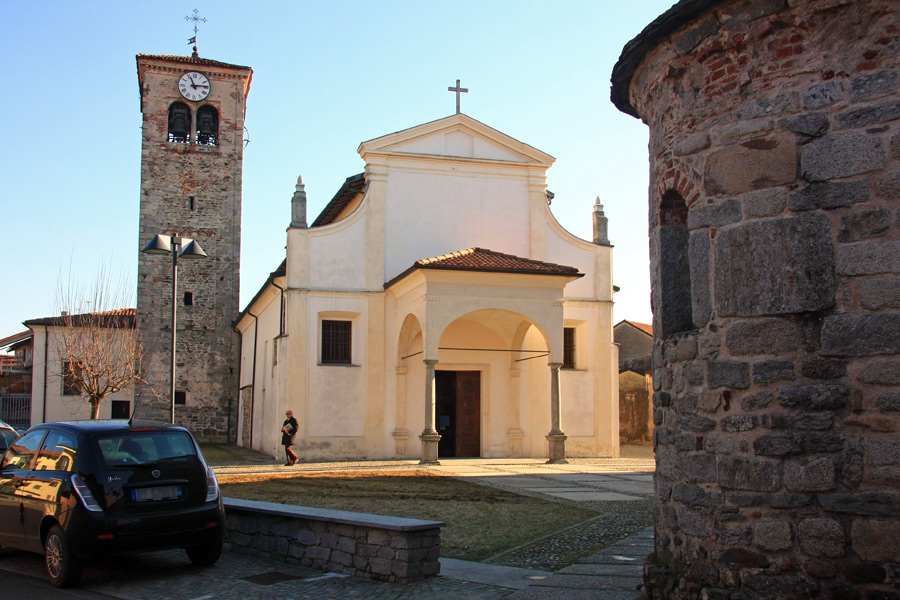
- Church in Cureggio

- Location within Italy Location within Piedmont
- Coordinates: 45°41′N 8°28′E
- Country: Italy
- Region: Piedmont
- Province: Novara (NO)
- Frazioni: Cascine Enea, Marzalesco

Government
  - Mayor: Angelo Barbaglia

Area
  - Total: 8.4 km^{2} (3.2 sq mi)
- Elevation: 289 m (948 ft)

Population (Dec. 2004)
  - Total: 2,303
  - Density: 270/km^{2} (710/sq mi)
- Demonym: Cureggesi
- Time zone: UTC+1 (CET)
  - Summer (DST): UTC+2 (CEST)
- Postal code: 28060
- Dialing code: 0322
- Website: Official website

Cureggio is a comune (municipality) in the Province of Novara in the Italian region of Piedmont, located about 90 kilometres (56 mi) northeast of Turin and about 30 kilometres (19 mi) northwest of Novara.

Cureggio borders the following municipalities: Boca, Borgomanero, Cavallirio, Fontaneto d'Agogna, and Maggiora.

The town also has a railway station, served by the Santhià–Arona railway (currently in disuse).
