= Cureggio railway station =

Disused railway station in Italy

Coordinates: 45°40′21″N 8°27′24″E

Cureggio
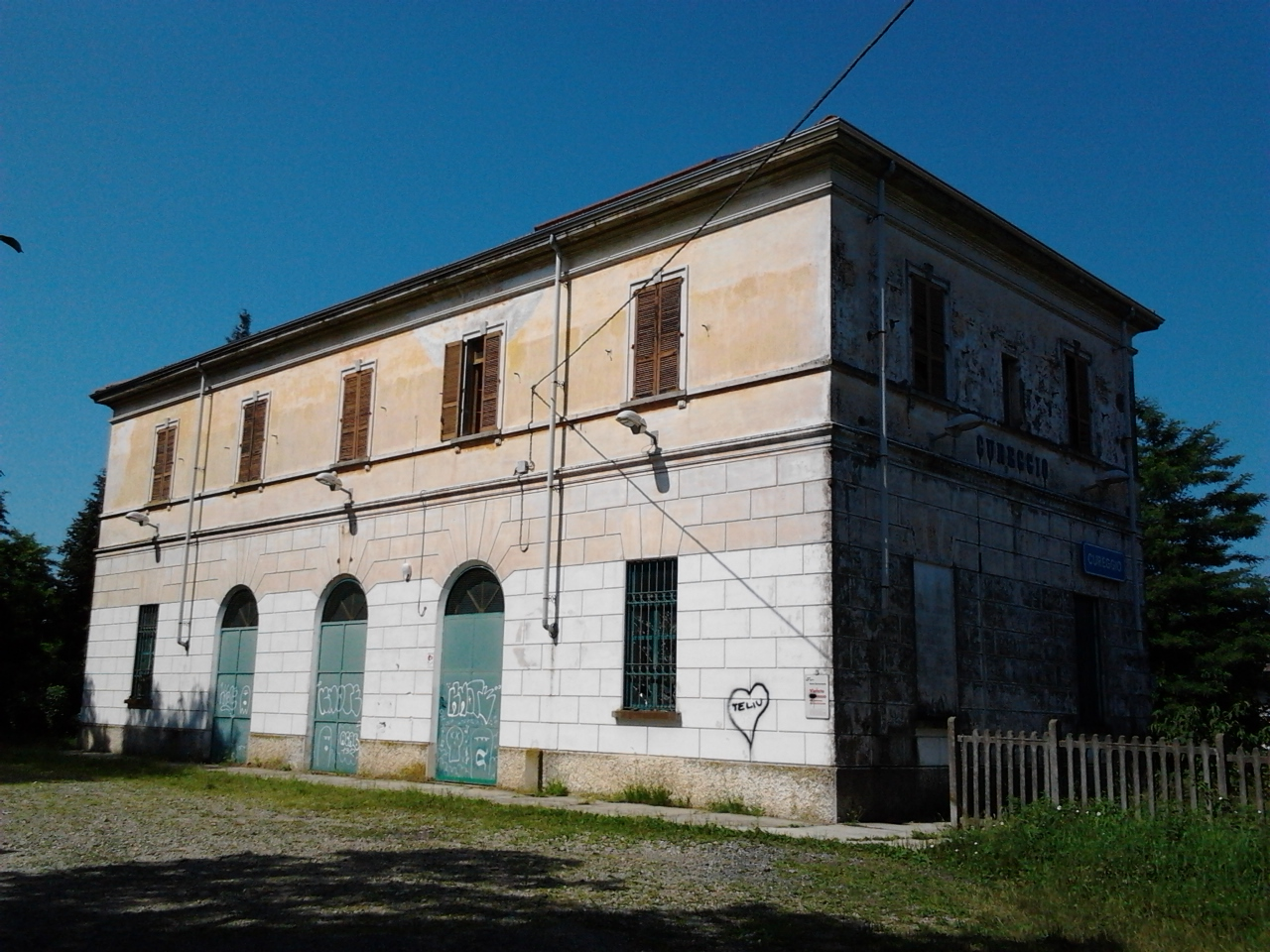
- The station as seen from the street

General information
- Location: Viale Roma, Cureggio (NO) 28060; Italy
- Line: Santhià–Arona railway
- Platforms: 2
- Tracks: 2
- Train operators: Trenitalia
- Connections: interurban bus lines

Other information
- Status: Closed to traffic

History
- Opened: 1905
- Closed: 2012
Location

Cureggio Railway Station is a disused passenger train station in Cureggio, Piedmont, in northwestern Italy. It was part of the Santhià-Arona line. The station has been closed to traffic since 2012 when its only line was suspended.

== History ==
The station first entered service in 1905 at the opening of the first section of the Santhià-Arona line between Santhià and Borgomanero. Railway traffic was initially controlled via telephone, through which the dirigente unico would coordinate manoeuvres with the station master.

In 1987, with the introduction of centralised traffic control, the station was equipped with electro-actuated switches, which replaced the previous manually operated system. This system also made it possible to have centralised control through a Central Operative Director.

Local onion farmers would use the station to send their produce to the markets of Milan and Turin.

The maintenance of the infrastructure was handled by Ferrovie dello Stato until it was passed on to the newly created Rete Ferroviaria Italiana in 2001.

== Closure and future ==
The station was regularly served by regional Trenitalia trains until 17 June 2012, when the railway line was suspended by the Piedmont Region.

The station is still sometimes used by RFI to store work trains used for renovation work on the Novara-Domodossola line.

In January 2022, it was reported that the regional government was prioritising the reopening of the line in talks with FS. In November 2022, it was announced that the line would be reopened by 2024-25, following a campaign by Alberto Gusmeroli, a deputy for the Piedmont 2 constituency.

== Layout and buildings ==
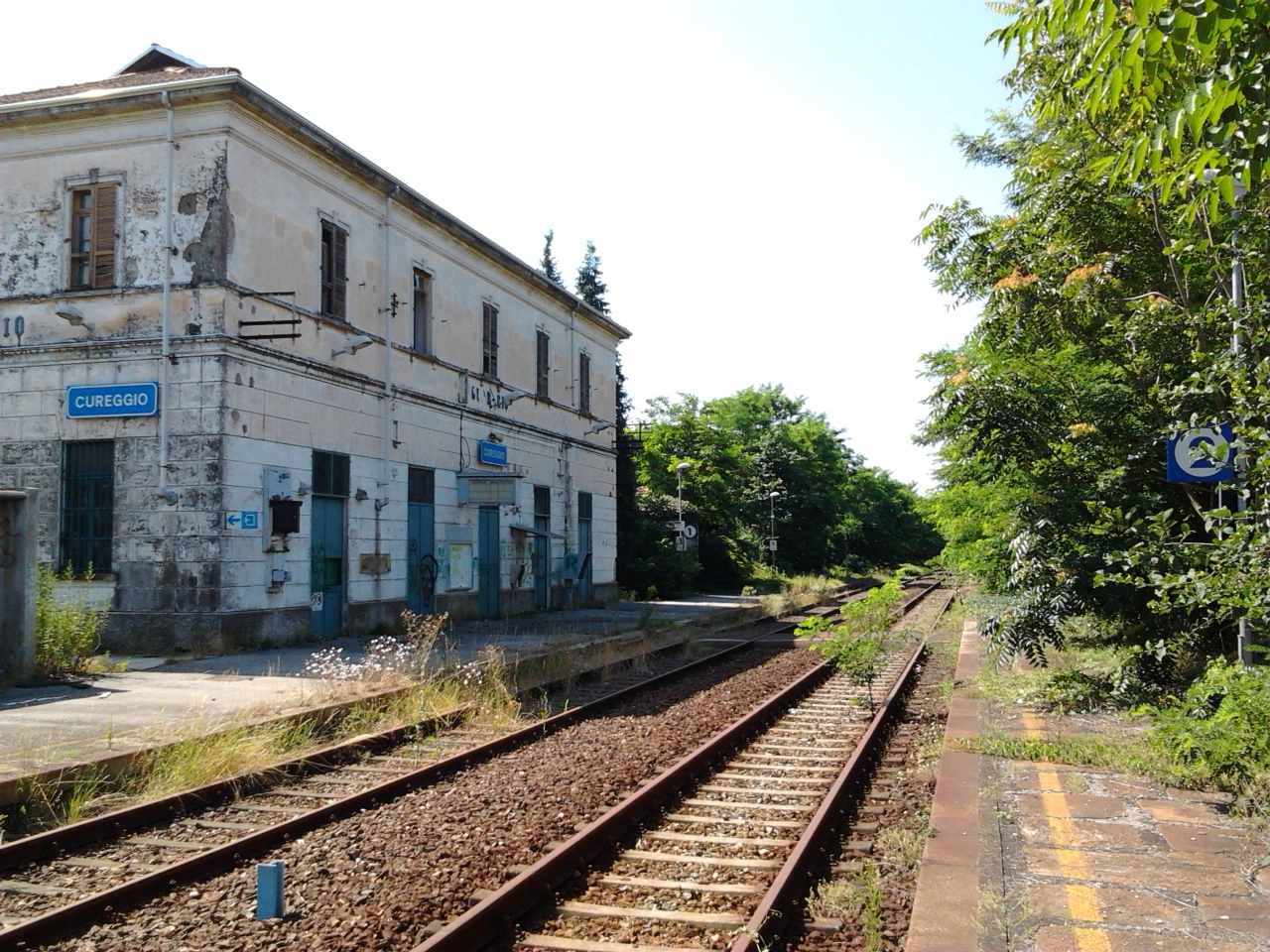
Tracks on the Santhià side

The station is made of two parallel tracks, each with its own platform. The two platforms are linked by a pedestrian level crossing. The majority of traffic transited through the second platform, as the first was only used for giving way to other trains or for when two trains would cross.

The station has a two-storey building. A concrete sidewalk is also present, with two ticket validator machines and information panels for passengers.

== Bibliography ==
- Mario Matto, Santhià e la ferrovia, una storia che dura da 150 anni, Editrice Grafica Santhiatese, Santhià 2006. ISBN 88-87374-95-3.
