= Boca, Novara =

Boca
- Comune
- Comune di Boca
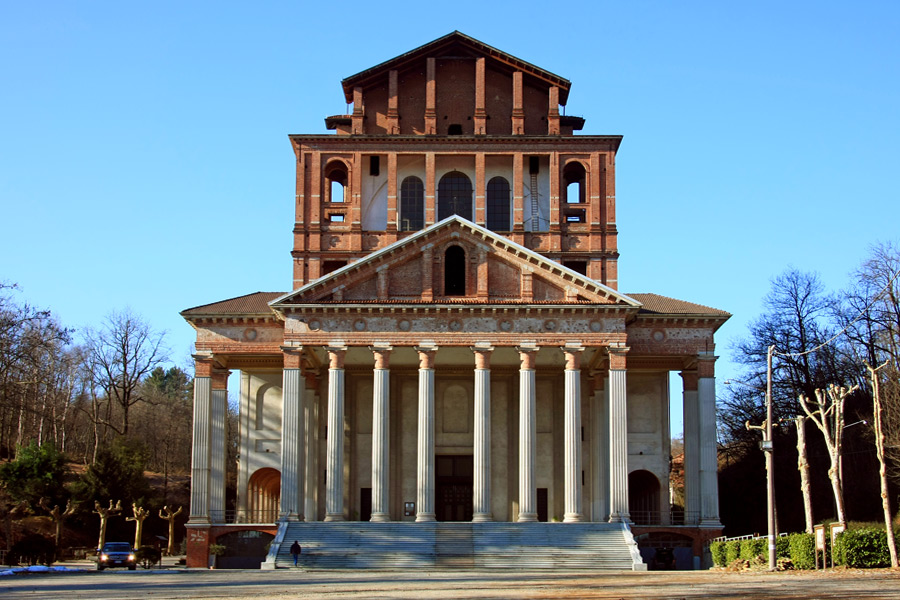
- Sanctuary of the Crucifix, Boca

- Coat of arms

- Location within Italy Location within Piedmont
- Coordinates: 45°41′N 8°25′E
- Country: Italy
- Region: Piedmont
- Province: Novara (NO)
- Frazioni: Marello, Fuino, Ronchetto, Baraggia, Piano Rosa

Government
  - Mayor: Flavio Minoli

Area
  - Total: 9.6 km^{2} (3.7 sq mi)
- Elevation: 389 m (1,276 ft)

Population (Dec. 2004)
  - Total: 1,195
  - Density: 120/km^{2} (320/sq mi)
- Demonym: Bochesi
- Time zone: UTC+1 (CET)
  - Summer (DST): UTC+2 (CEST)
- Postal code: 28010
- Dialing code: 0322
- Patron saint: Saint Gaudentius of Novara
- Saint day: 22 January
- Website: Official website

Boca (Piedmontese: Bòca, Lombard: Boca) is a comune (municipality) in the Province of Novara in the Italian region Piedmont, located about 90 kilometres (56 mi) northeast of Turin and about 30 kilometres (19 mi) northwest of Novara.

Boca borders the following municipalities: Cavallirio, Cureggio, Grignasco, Maggiora, Prato Sesia, and Valduggia.

== Monument ==
One of the most important churches in Boca is Santuario del Santissimo Crocifisso, The biggest Church in Boca. There are some other churches in the village:

- Chiesa Parrocchiale
- Chiesa della Madonna delle Grazie
- Chiesa di san Rocco
- Chiesa della Madonna della Neve (fraz. Baraggia).

Next to the Sanctuary there is the Natural Park of Mount Fenera

== Boca DOC ==
The commune of Boca is home to the Denominazione di origine controllata (DOC) wine which includes 15 hectares (37 acres) producing a single red wine. The wine is a blend of 45-70% Nebbiolo, 20-40% Vespolina and up to 20% of Uva Rara (known locally as Bonarda Novarese). All grapes destined for DOC wine production need to be harvested to a yield no greater than 9 tonnes/ha. The wine is the required to be aged in barrels for at least 2 years with another additional year of aging in the bottle before it can be released to the public. The finished wine must attain a minimum alcohol level of 12% in order to be labelled with the Boca DOC designation.
