= Romagnano Sesia =

- Comune
- Comune di Romagnano Sesia
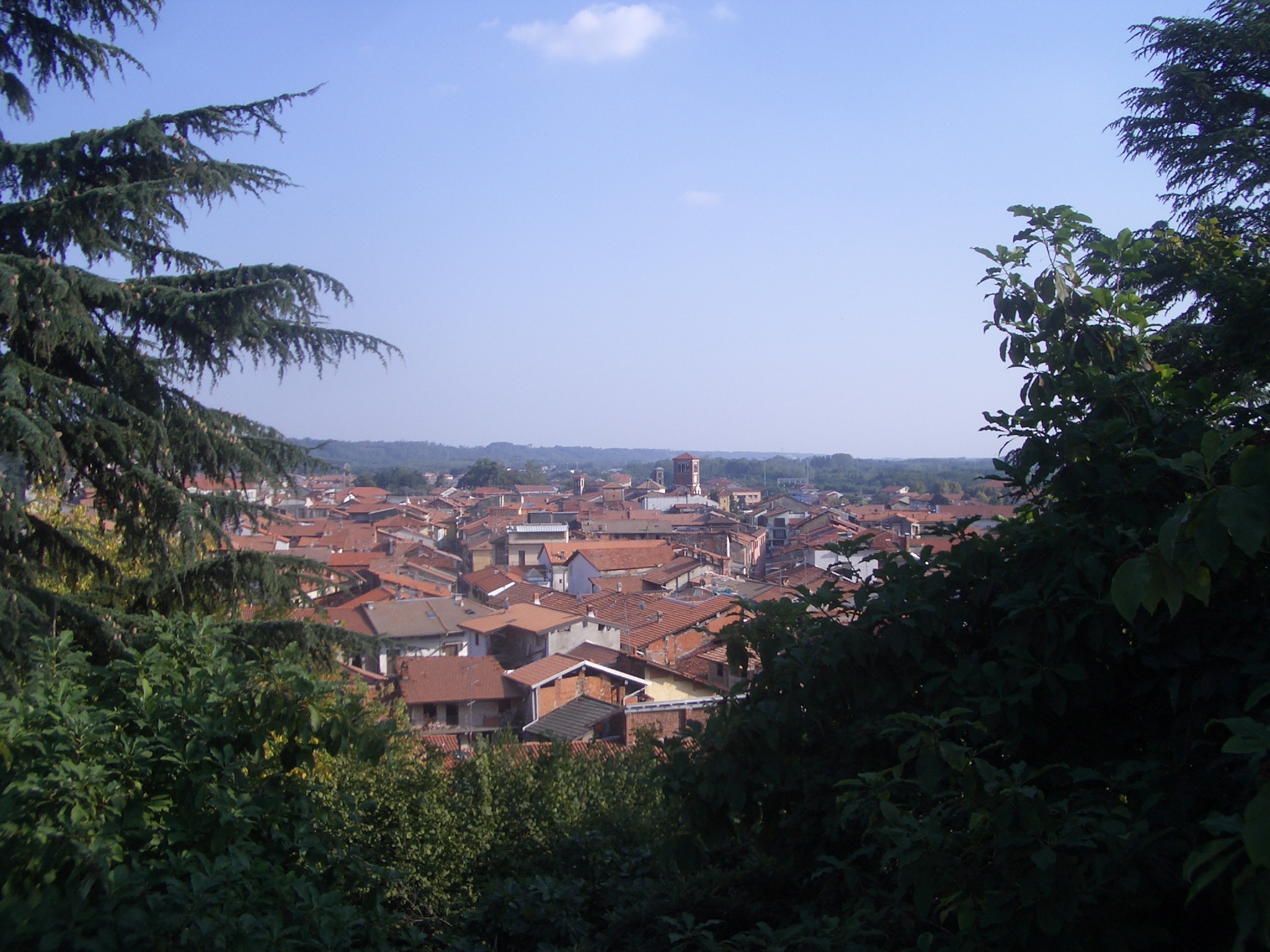
- View of Romagnano Sesia

- Coat of arms

- Location within Italy Location within Piedmont
- Coordinates: 45°38′N 8°23′E
- Country: Italy
- Region: Piedmont
- Province: Novara (NO)
- Frazioni: Mauletta

Government
  - Mayor: Alessandro Carini

Area
  - Total: 17.98 km^{2} (6.94 sq mi)
- Elevation: 266 m (873 ft)

Population (2007)
  - Total: 4,045
  - Density: 225.0/km^{2} (582.7/sq mi)
- Demonym: Romagnanesi
- Time zone: UTC+1 (CET)
  - Summer (DST): UTC+2 (CEST)
- Postal code: 28078
- Dialing code: 0163
- Patron saint: St. Silvanus
- Website: Official website

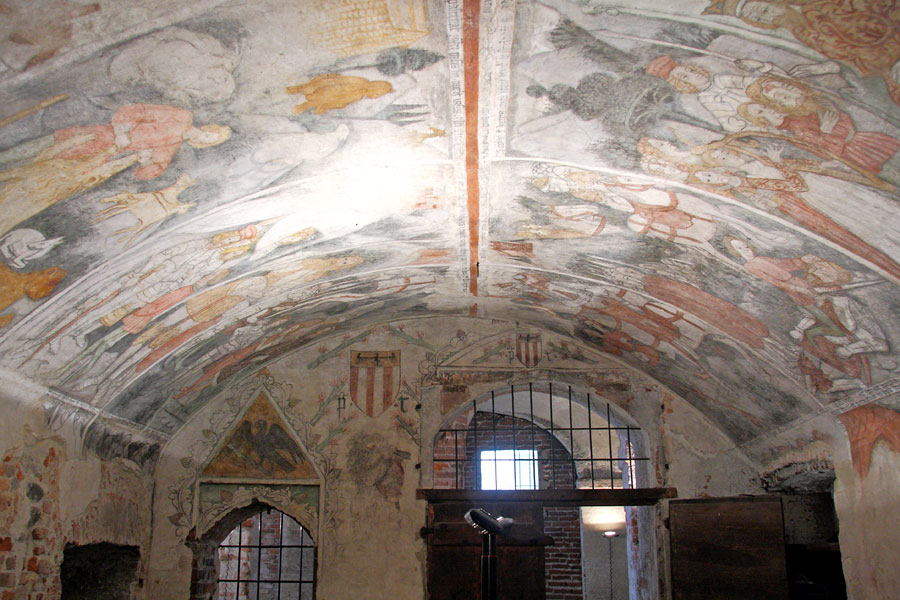

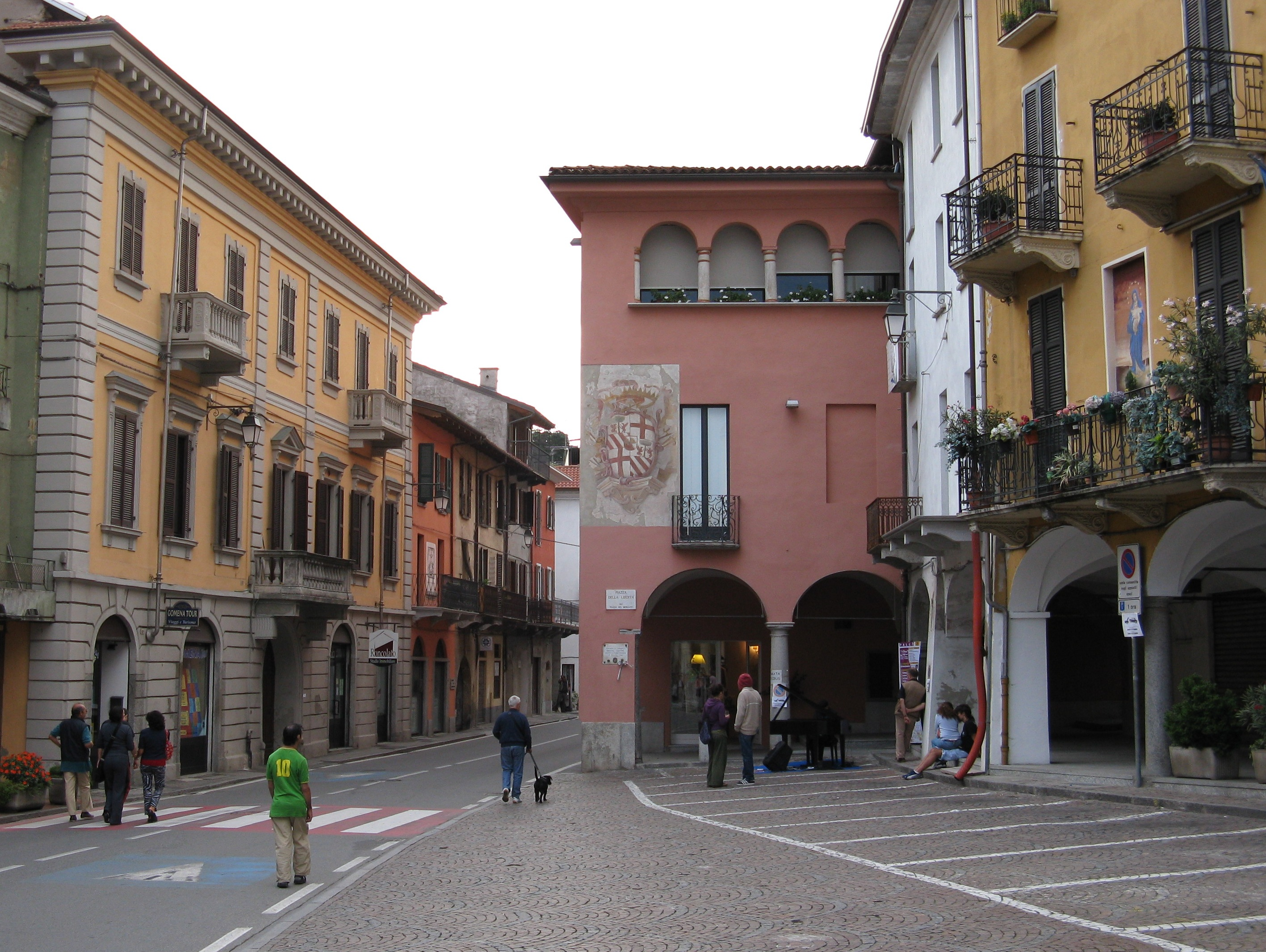
Piazza della Liberta

Romagnano Sesia is a town and comune (municipality) of about 4,000 inhabitants in the Province of Novara in the Italian region Piedmont, located about 80 kilometres (50 mi) northeast of Turin and about 25 kilometres (16 mi) northwest of Novara.

Romagnano Sesia borders the following municipalities: Cavallirio, Fontaneto d'Agogna, Gattinara, Ghemme, Prato Sesia, and Serravalle Sesia. Sights include the so-called "Cantina dei Santi" (Saints' cellar), which is a room which is the only remaining evidence of the ancient, powerful Benedictine monastery of S. Silano. The Cantina is completely painted with frescos dating back to the 15th century (Biblical story of David and King Saul).

== History ==
The town already existed in the 1st century AD, when it constituted a path that connected the Novara area with Valsesia; its name derives from "Romana Mansio". Archaeological finds from the Roman era discovered during excavations testify to this ancient origin. The first historical document that mentions the town dates back to 882 when it - already belonging to the March of Ivrea - was donated by Charles the Fat to the bishop of Vercelli. Another document, dating back to 1008, testifies to the presence of a Benedictine abbey dedicated to San Silano (or Saint Silvan) who must have played an important role in the town's economic development. Only a few rooms remain of this ancient and glorious abbey, including the so-called Cellar of the Saints, which houses interesting frescoes from the 15th century.

In 1198, the regency of Novara granted Romagnano the dignity of Burgus shortly afterward a castle was built there; of this construction, destroyed by French troops in 1477, the Praetorian Palace has been partially preserved, with an elegant rectangular tower (later raised in the second half of the 15th century). After that era a Borgo was created under the fiefdom of the Marquises of Romagnano; it then passed under the dominion of the Viscontis with whom it flourished economically. Disputed by many parties, being a borderland, the fiefdom of Di Romagnano family experienced a dense series of political changes, passing to various feudal families, from the Dal Pozzo of Vercelli, to the Borromeo, to the Ferrero-Fieschi.
