= Piscina di Pinerolo railway station =

Railway station in Italy

Piscina di Pinerolo

General information
- Location: Via Generale Pronotto, Piscina; Piscina, Metropolitan City of Turin, Piedmont; Italy
- Coordinates: 44.9217°N 7.4255°E
- Owner: Rete Ferroviaria Italiana
- Operator: Rete Ferroviaria Italiana
- Line: Turin – Pinerolo–Torre Pellice
- Platforms: 2
- Train operators: Trenitalia
- Connections: Local buses
Location
- Location within Piedmont Location within Northern Italy Location within Italy

Piscina di Pinerolo railway station (Italian: Stazione di Piscina di Pinerolo) serves the town and comune of Piscina, in the Piedmont region of northwestern Italy. The station is a through station of the Turin-Pinerolo-Torre Pellice railway.

Since 2012 it has served line SFM2, part of the Turin metropolitan railway service.

== Services ==
Preceding station	Turin SFM	Following station
Airasca towards Chivasso	SFM2	Pinerolo Olimpica towards Pinerolo
