= Nichelino railway station =

Railway station in Italy

Nichelino
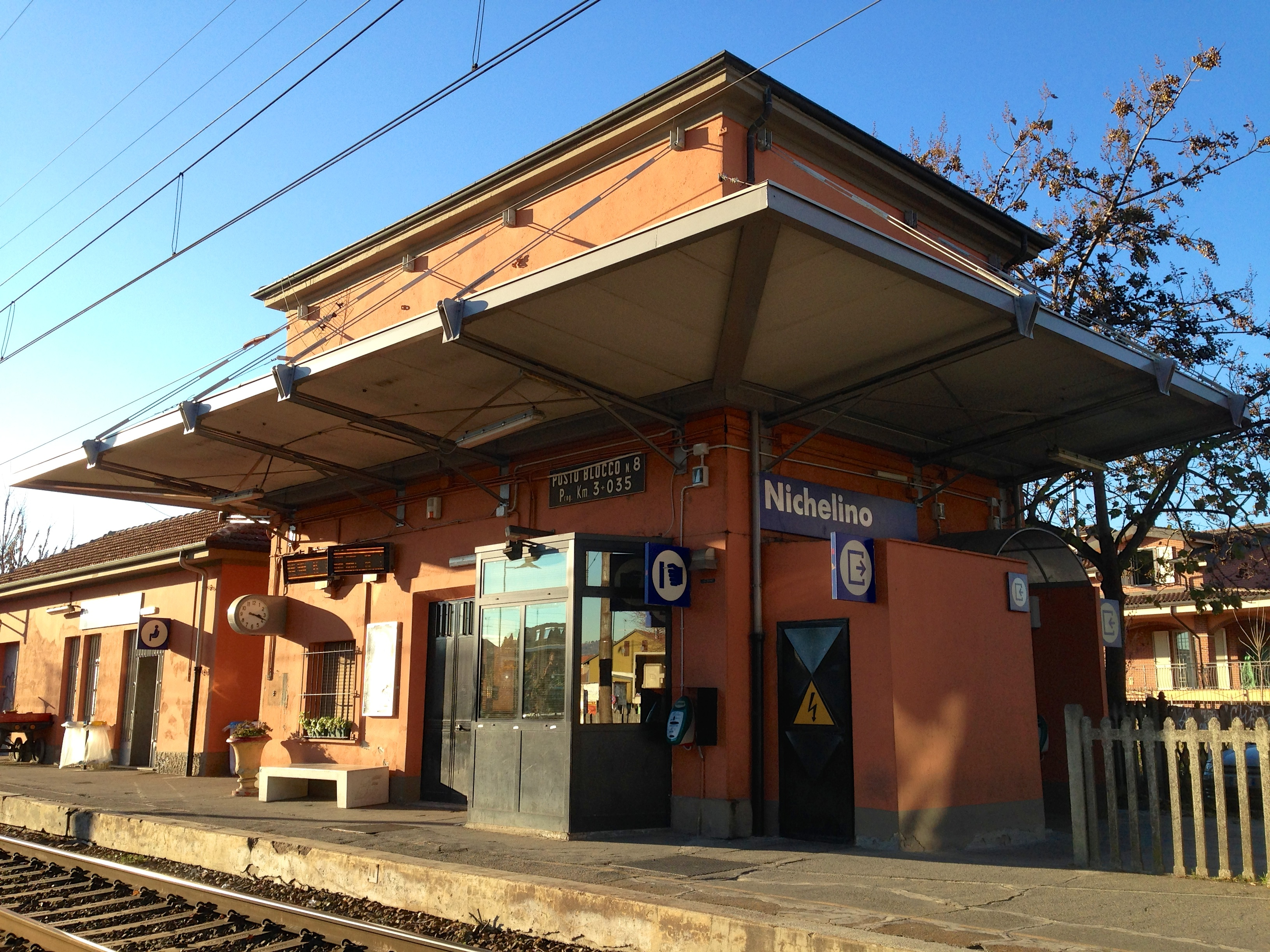

General information
- Location: Viale della Stazione 3, Nichelino; Nichelino, Metropolitan City of Turin, Piedmont; Italy
- Coordinates: 44.9914°N 7.6420°E
- Owner: Rete Ferroviaria Italiana
- Operator: Rete Ferroviaria Italiana
- Line: Turin – Pinerolo – Torre Pellice
- Platforms: 1
- Train operators: Trenitalia
- Connections: Local buses
Location
- Location within Piedmont Location within Northern Italy Location within Italy

Nichelino railway station (Italian: Stazione di Nichelino) serves the town and comune of Nichelino, in the Piedmont region, northwestern Italy. The station is a through station of the Turin-Pinerolo-Torre Pellice railway.

Since 2012 it serves line SFM2, part of the Turin metropolitan railway service.

== Services ==
Preceding station	Turin SFM	Following station
Moncalieri Sangone towards Chivasso	SFM2	Candiolo towards Pinerolo
