= Candiolo railway station =

Railway station in Piedmont, Italy

Candiolo
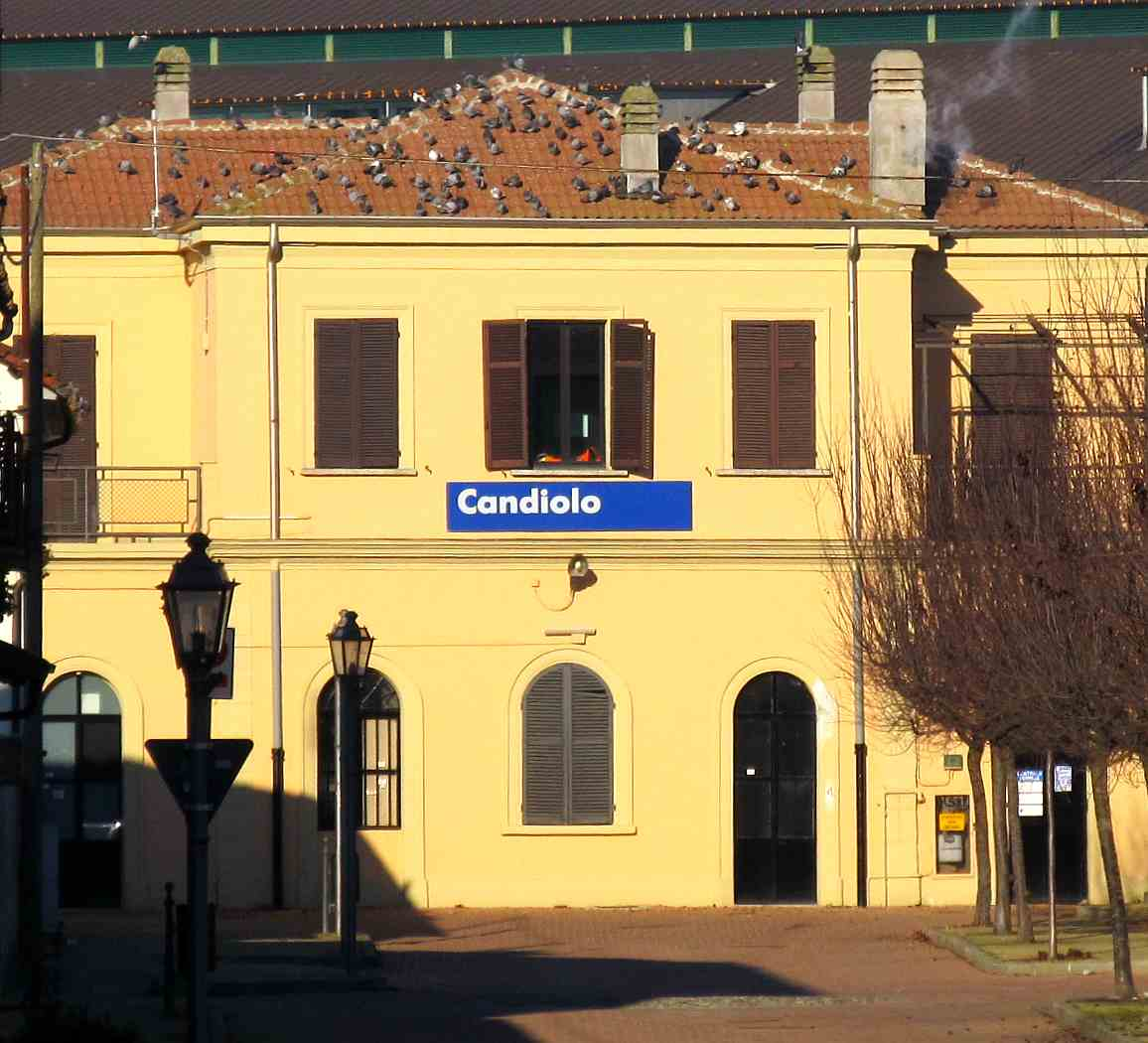

General information
- Location: Via Simonis, Candiolo; Candiolo, Metropolitan City of Turin, Piedmont; Italy
- Coordinates: 44.9611°N 7.5990°E
- Owner: Rete Ferroviaria Italiana
- Operator: Rete Ferroviaria Italiana
- Line: Turin – Pinerolo –Torre Pellice
- Platforms: 3
- Train operators: Trenitalia
- Connections: Local buses
Location
- Location within Piedmont Location within Northern Italy Location within Italy

Candiolo railway station (Italian: Stazione di Candiolo) serves the town and comune of Candiolo, in the Piedmont region of northwestern Italy. The station is a through station of the Turin-Pinerolo-Torre Pellice railway.

Since 2012 it has served line SFM2, part of the Turin metropolitan railway service.

== Services ==
Preceding station	Turin SFM	Following station
Nichelino towards Chivasso	SFM2	None towards Pinerolo
