= None railway station =

Railway station in Italy

None
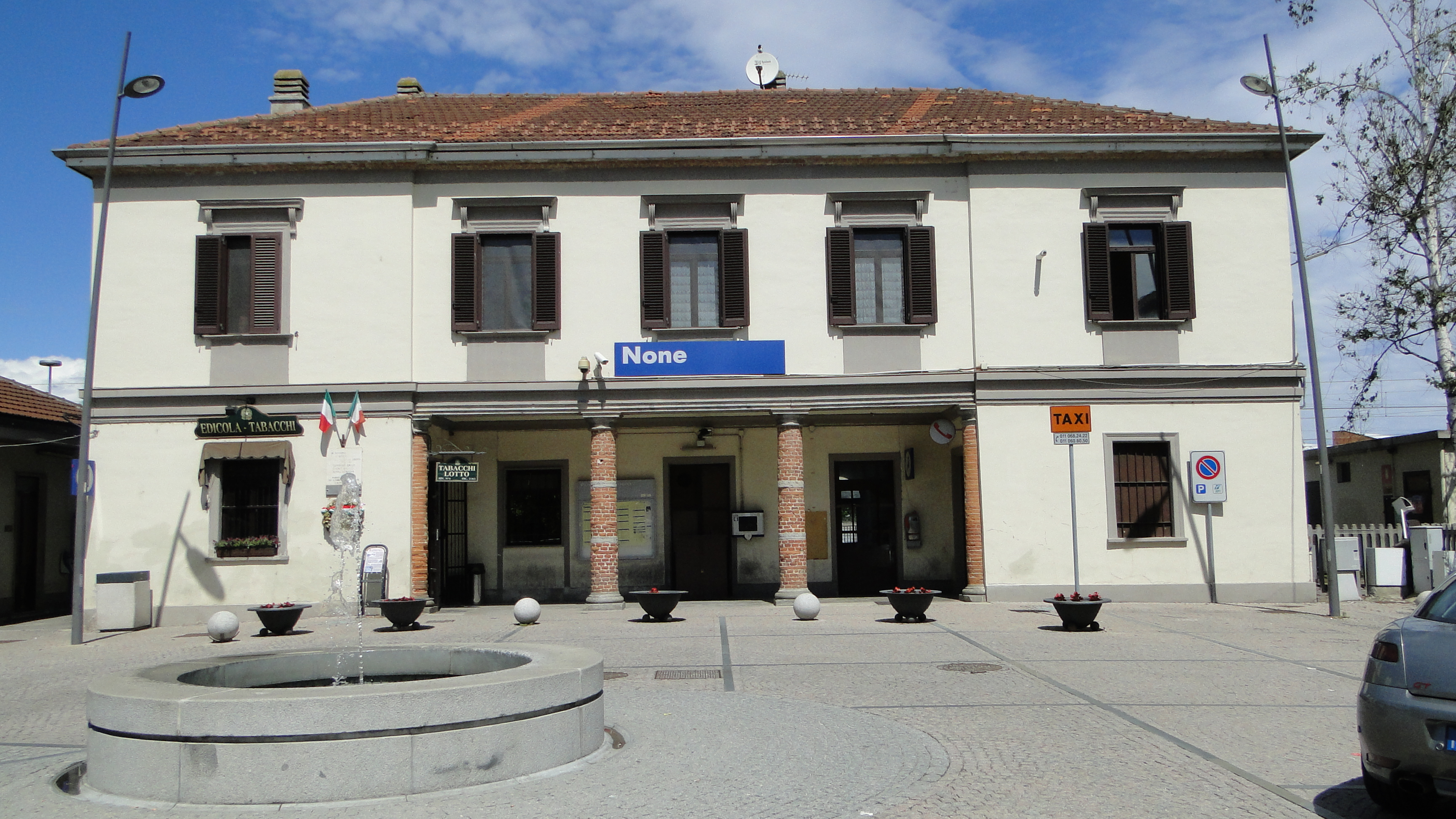
- Railway station of None (Italy)

General information
- Location: Via Stazione, None; None, Metropolitan City of Turin, Piedmont; Italy
- Coordinates: 44.938°N 7.540°E
- Owner: Rete Ferroviaria Italiana
- Operator: Rete Ferroviaria Italiana
- Line: Turin – Pinerolo–Torre Pellice
- Platforms: 3
- Train operators: Trenitalia
- Connections: Local buses
Location
- Location within Piedmont Location within Northern Italy Location within Italy

None railway station (Italian: Stazione di None) serves the town and comune of None, in the Piedmont region of northwestern Italy. The station is a through station of the Turin-Pinerolo-Torre Pellice railway.

Since 2012 it has served line SFM2, part of the Turin metropolitan railway service.

== Services ==
Preceding station	Turin SFM	Following station
Candiolo towards Chivasso	SFM2	Airasca towards Pinerolo
