= Airasca railway station =

Railway station in Italy

Airasca
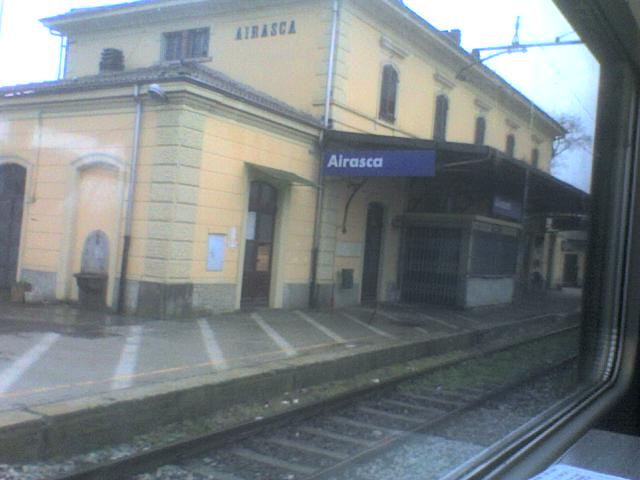

General information
- Location: Via Stazione, Airasca; Airasca, Metropolitan City of Turin, Piedmont; Italy
- Coordinates: 44.9280°N 7.4834°E
- Owner: Rete Ferroviaria Italiana
- Operator: Rete Ferroviaria Italiana
- Lines: Airasca–Saluzzo railway line (defunct); Turin – Pinerolo–Torre Pellice
- Platforms: 3
- Train operators: Trenitalia
- Connections: Local buses

History
- Opened: 1854

Services
Preceding station	Turin SFM	Following station
None towards Chivasso	SFM2	Piscina di Pinerolo towards Pinerolo
Location
- Location within Piedmont Location within Northern Italy Location within Italy

Airasca railway station (Italian: Stazione di Airasca) serves the town and comune of Airasca, in the Piedmont region, northwestern Italy. The station is a through station of the Turin-Pinerolo-Torre Pellice railway.

Since 2012 it has served line SFM2, part of the Turin metropolitan railway service.
