= Moncalieri Sangone railway station =

Railway station in Moncalieri, Italy

Moncalieri Sangone
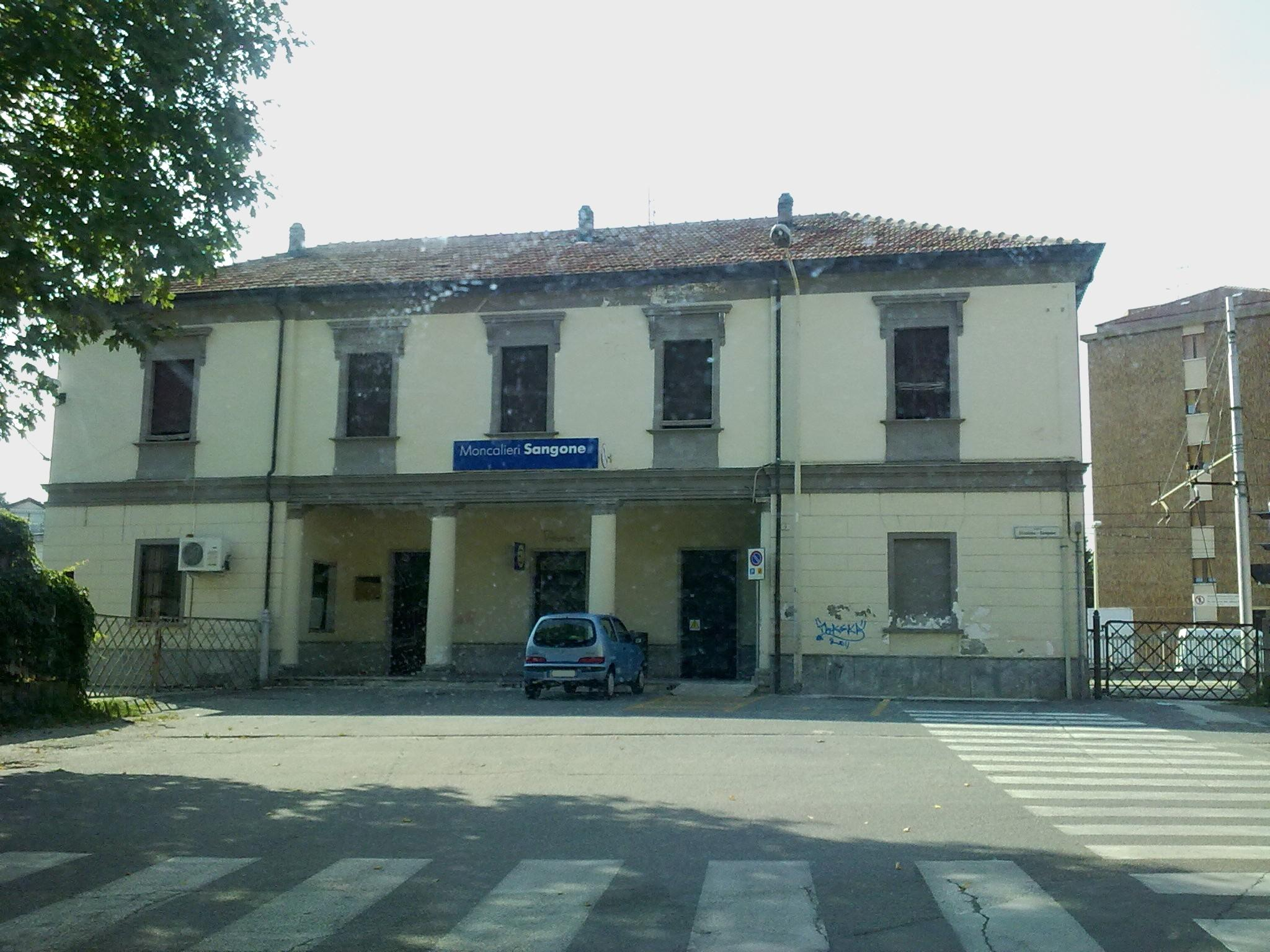

General information
- Location: Viale Stazione Sangone, Moncalieri; Moncalieri, Metropolitan City of Turin, Piedmont; Italy
- Coordinates: 45.0004°N 7.6681°E
- Owner: Rete Ferroviaria Italiana
- Operator: Rete Ferroviaria Italiana
- Line: Turin – Pinerolo – Torre Pellice
- Platforms: 3
- Train operators: Trenitalia
- Connections: Local buses

History
- Opened: 1854
Location
- Location within Piedmont Location within Northern Italy Location within Italy

Moncalieri Sangone railway station (Italian: Stazione di Moncalieri Sangone) serves the town and comune of Moncalieri, in the Piedmont region of northwestern Italy. The station is a through station of the Turin-Pinerolo-Torre Pellice railway.

The station became operational on 27 July 1854. Since 2012 it has served line SFM2, part of the Turin metropolitan railway service.

== Services ==
Preceding station	Turin SFM	Following station
Torino Lingotto towards Chivasso	SFM2	Nichelino towards Pinerolo
