= Pinerolo Olimpica railway station =

Railway station in Pinerolo, Italy

Pinerolo Olimpica

General information
- Location: Via dei Rochis, Piscina; Pinerolo, Metropolitan City of Turin, Piedmont; Italy
- Coordinates: 44.8917°N 7.3485°E
- Owner: Rete Ferroviaria Italiana
- Operator: Rete Ferroviaria Italiana
- Line: Turin – Pinerolo–Torre Pellice
- Platforms: 3
- Train operators: Trenitalia
- Connections: Local buses

History
- Opened: 2006
Location
- Location within Piedmont Location within Northern Italy Location within Italy

Pinerolo Olimpica railway station (Italian: Stazione di Pinerolo Olimpica) serves the town and comune of Pinerolo, in the Piedmont region of northwestern Italy. It is a through station of the Turin-Pinerolo-Torre Pellice railway.

Since 2012 the station has served line SFM2, part of the Turin metropolitan railway service.

== Services ==
Preceding station	Turin SFM	Following station
Piscina di Pinerolo towards Chivasso	SFM2	Pinerolo Terminus
