= List of heritage railways in Italy =

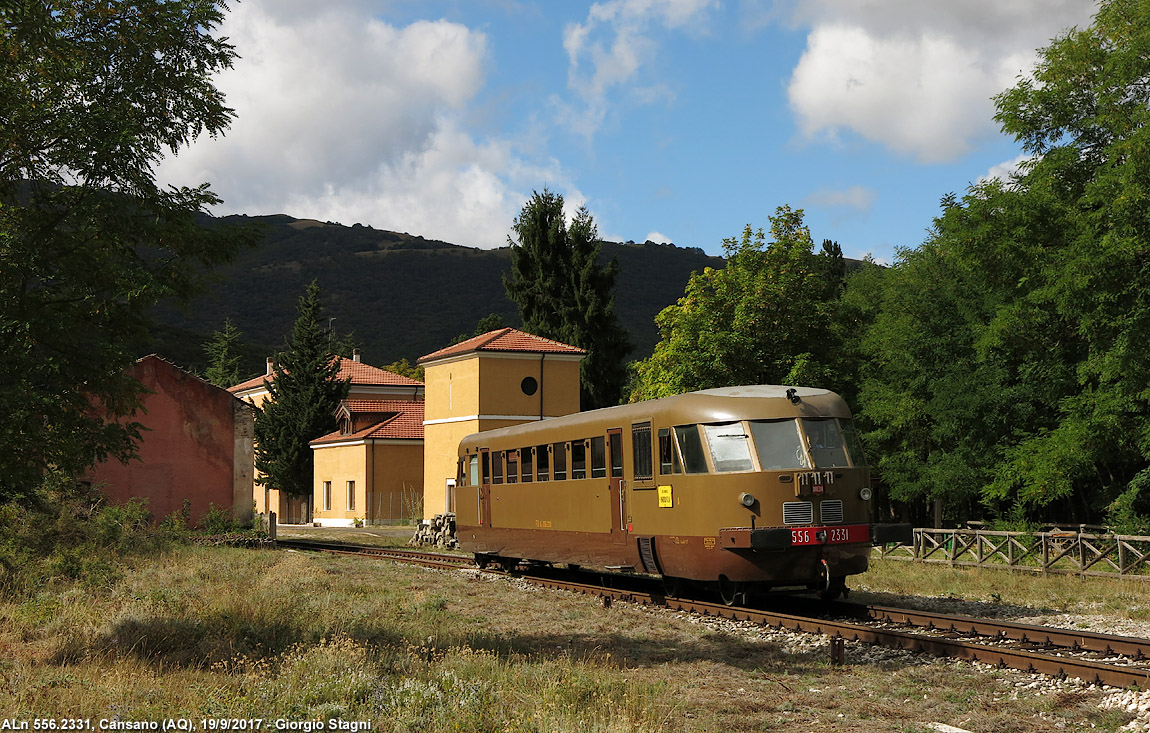
Historic train at the Cansano railway station, along the now tourist Sulmona–Isernia railway in Italy.

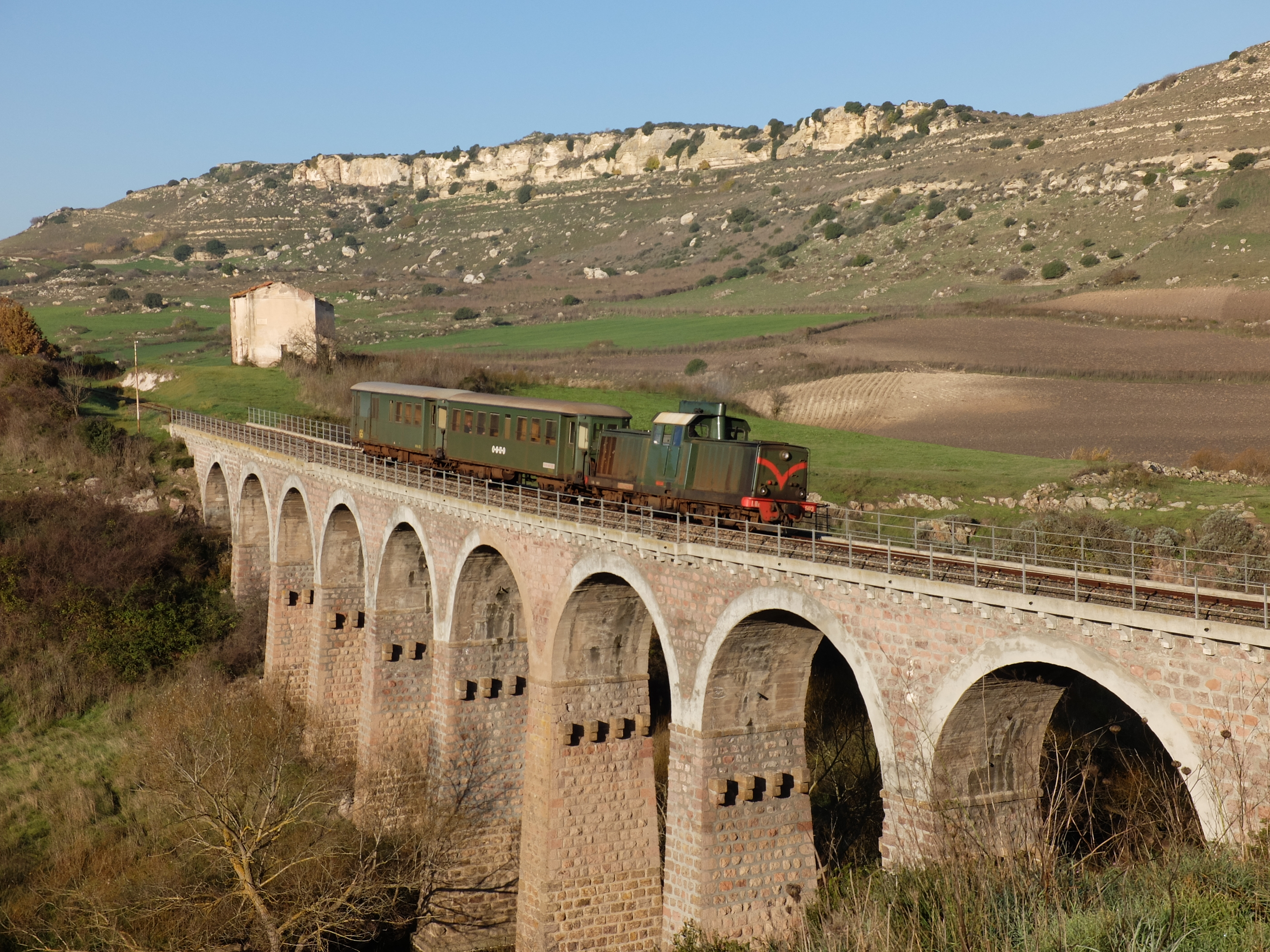
Tourist train in transit on a viaduct of the Sassari–Tempio–Palau railway in Italy

This is a list of heritage railways in Italy.

== Overview ==
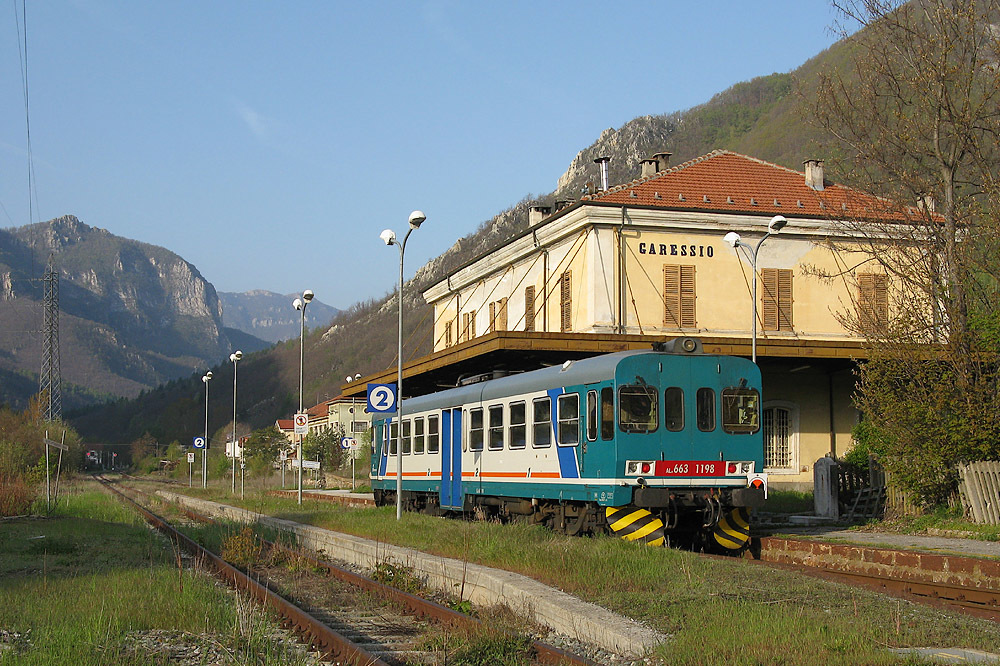
Tourist train in transit on the Ceva–Ormea railway in Italy

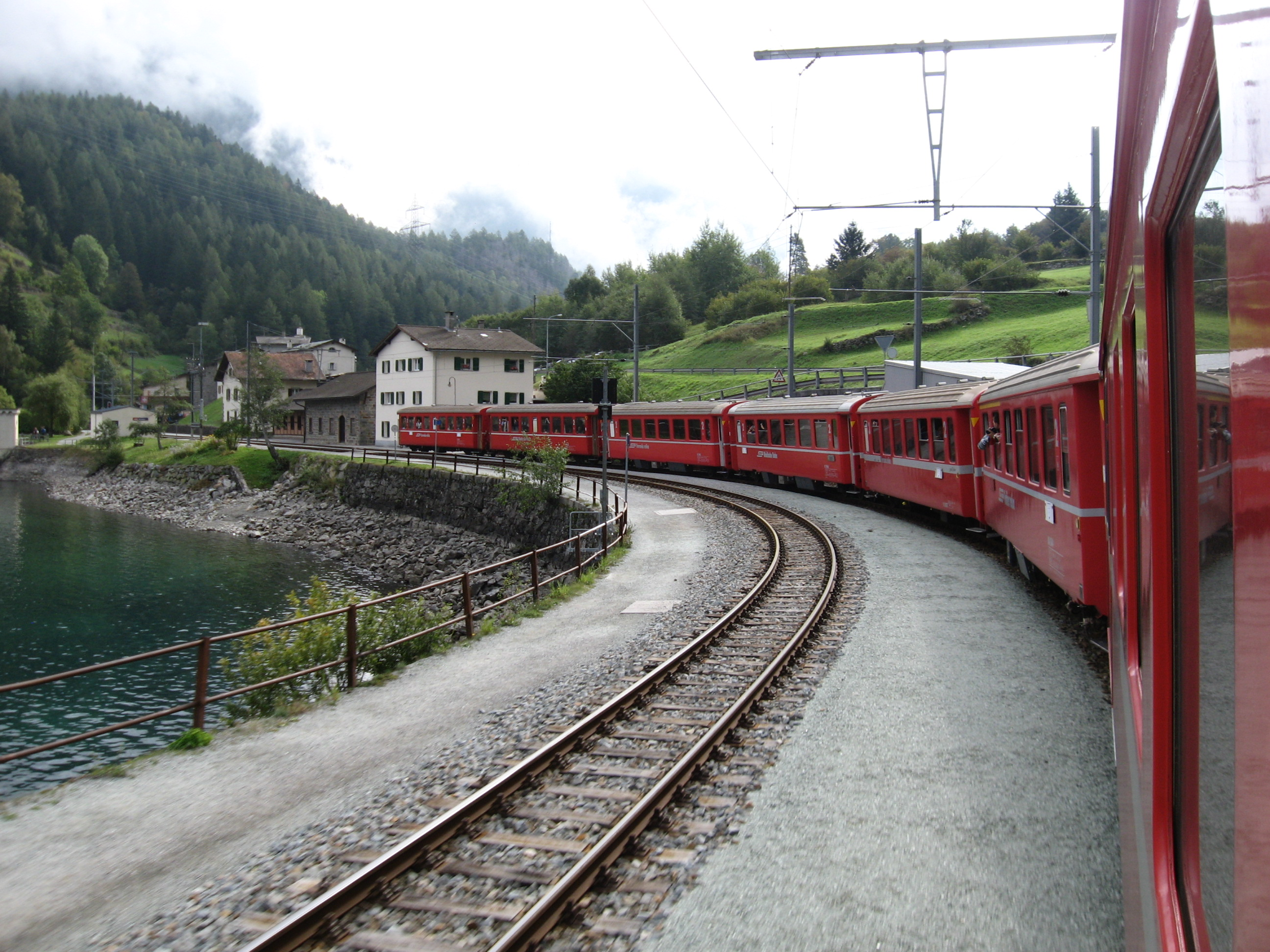
Bernina railway line between Poschiavo, Switzerland, and Tirano, Italy

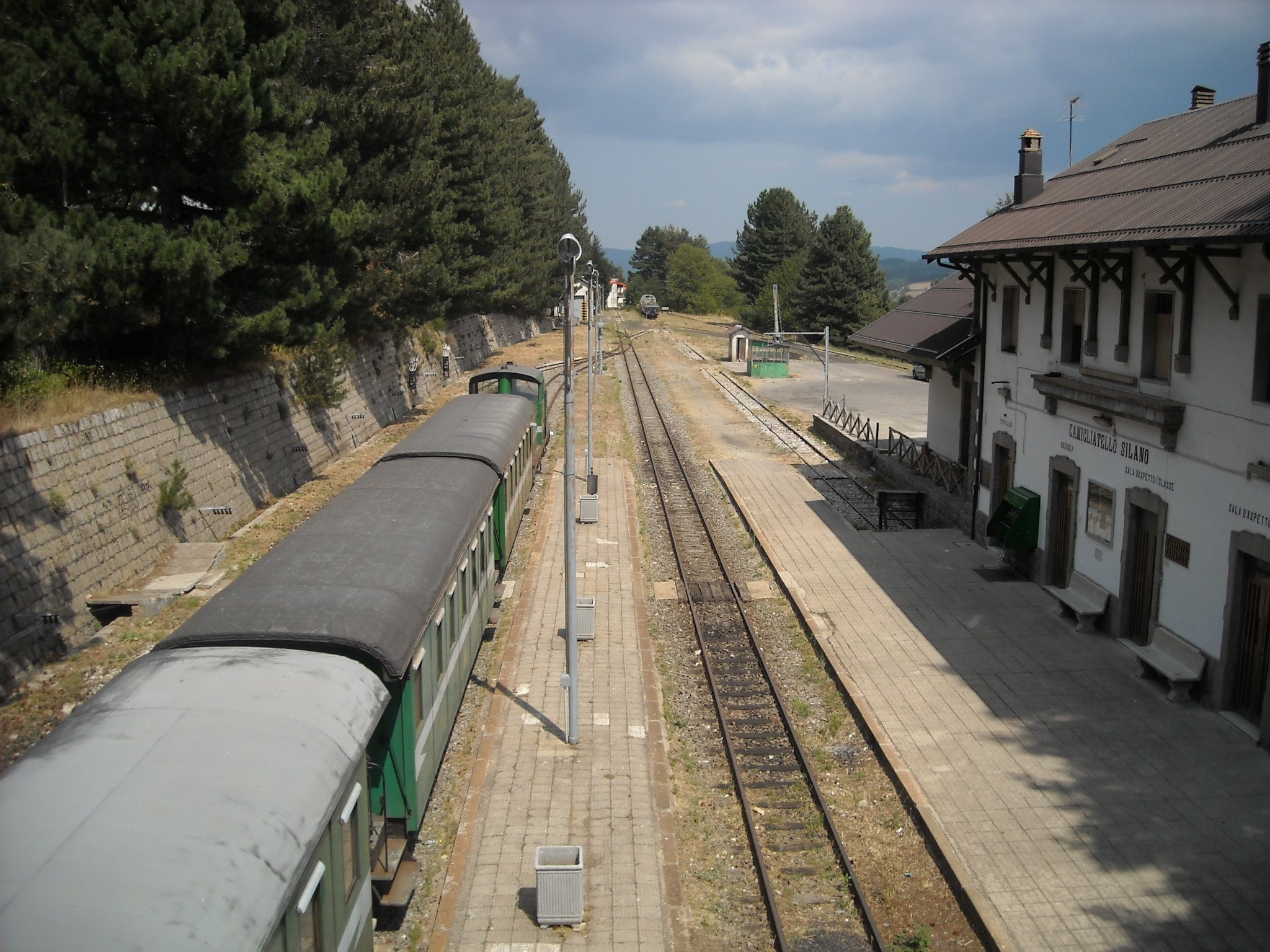
Tourist train on the Cosenza-Camigliatello–San Giovanni in Fiore railway in Italy

In Italy the heritage railway institute is recognized and protected by law no. 128 of 9 August 2017, which has as its objective the protection and valorisation of disused, suspended or abolished railway lines, of particular cultural, landscape and tourist value, including both railway routes and stations and the related works of art and appurtenances, on which, upon proposal of the regions to which they belong, tourism-type traffic management is applied (art. 2, paragraph 1). At the same time, the law identified a first list of 18 tourist railways, considered to be of particular value (art. 2, paragraph 2).

The list is periodically updated by decree of the Ministry of Infrastructure and Transport, in agreement with the Ministry of Economy and Finance and the Ministry of Culture, also taking into account the reports in the State-Regions Conference. According to article 1, law 128/2017 has as its purpose: "the protection and valorisation of railway sections of particular cultural, landscape and tourist value, which include railway routes, stations and related works of art and appurtenances, and of the historic and tourist rolling stock authorized to travel along them, as well as the regulation of the use of ferrocycles".

The Bernina railway line is a single-track 1,000 mm (3 ft 3 3/8 in) metre gauge railway line forming part of the Rhaetian Railway (RhB). It links the spa resort of St. Moritz, in the canton of Graubünden, Switzerland, with the town of Tirano, in the Province of Sondrio, Italy, via the Bernina Pass. Reaching a height of 2,253 metres (7,392 ft) above sea level, it is the third highest railway crossing in Europe. It also ranks as the highest adhesion railway of the continent, and – with inclines of up to 7% – as one of the steepest adhesion railways in the world. The elevation difference on the section between the Bernina Pass and Tirano is 1,824 m (5,984 ft), allowing passengers to view glaciers along the line. On 7 July 2008, the Bernina line and the Albula railway line, which also forms part of the RhB, were recorded in the list of UNESCO World Heritage Sites, under the name Rhaetian Railway in the Albula / Bernina Landscapes. The whole site is a cross-border joint Swiss-Italian heritage area. Trains operating on the Bernina line include the Bernina Express.

In July 2023, Ferrovie dello Stato established a new company, the "FS Treni Turistici Italiani" (English: FS Italian Tourist Trains), with the mission "to propose an offer of railway services expressly designed and calibrated for quality, sustainable tourism and attentive to rediscovering the riches of the Italian territory. Tourism that can experience the train journey as an integral moment of the holiday, an element of quality in the overall tourist experience". There are three service areas proposed:

- Luxury trains, which includes the circulation of the "Orient Express - La Dolce Vita" from 2024, and Venice Simplon Orient Express, already operating on European routes;
- Express and historic trains, with the express trains of the 1980s and 1990s which being redeveloped and modernized in the railway workshops of Rimini, while the historic trains are used for journeys that include stops with guided tours and tastings;
- Regional trains, also with trips that include experiential tourist stops, which pass through places rich in history, with villages and areas of landscape, naturalistic, food and wine and agri-food interest.

== Heritage railways ==
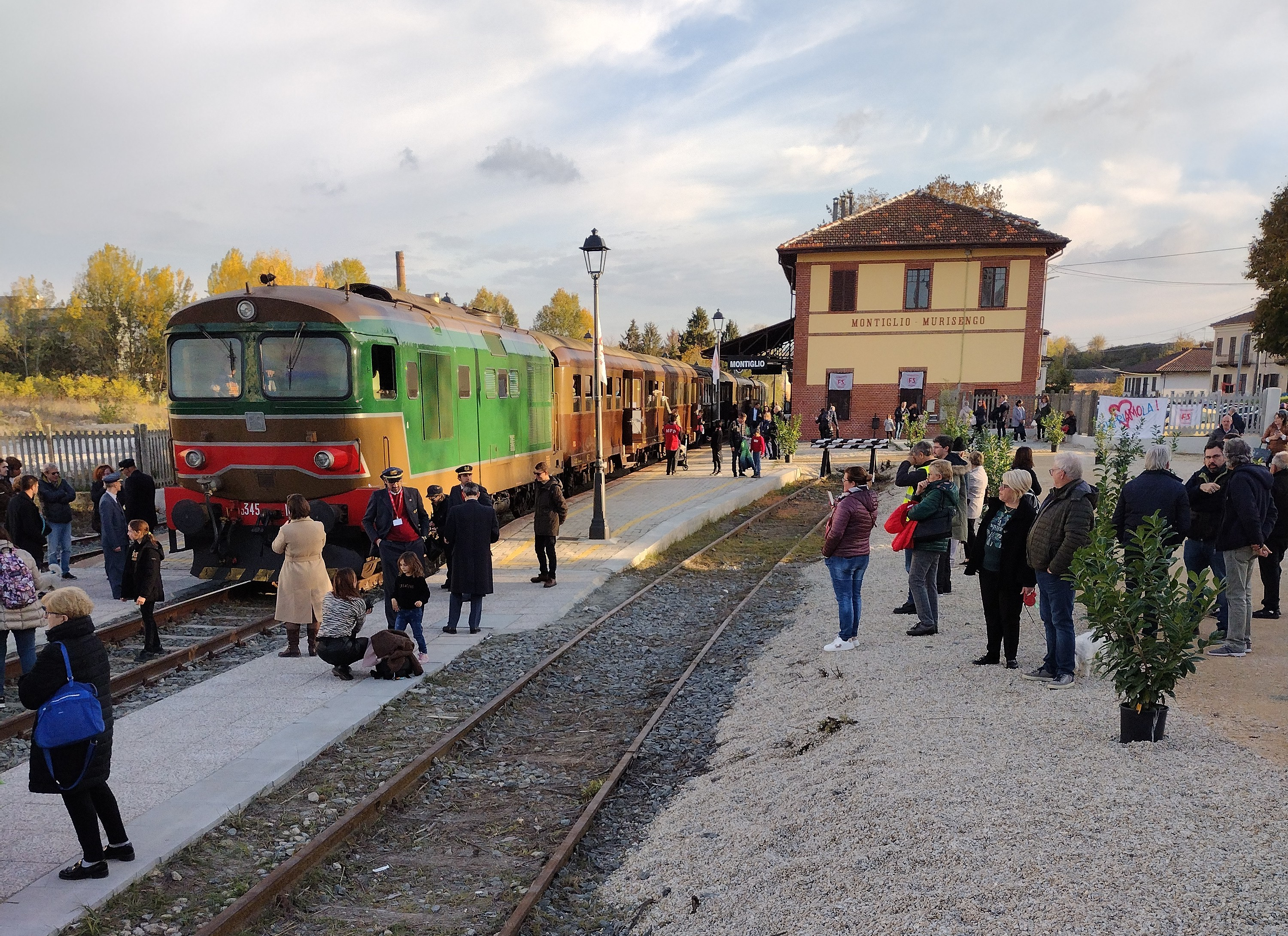
Tourist train on the Chivasso–Asti railway in Italy

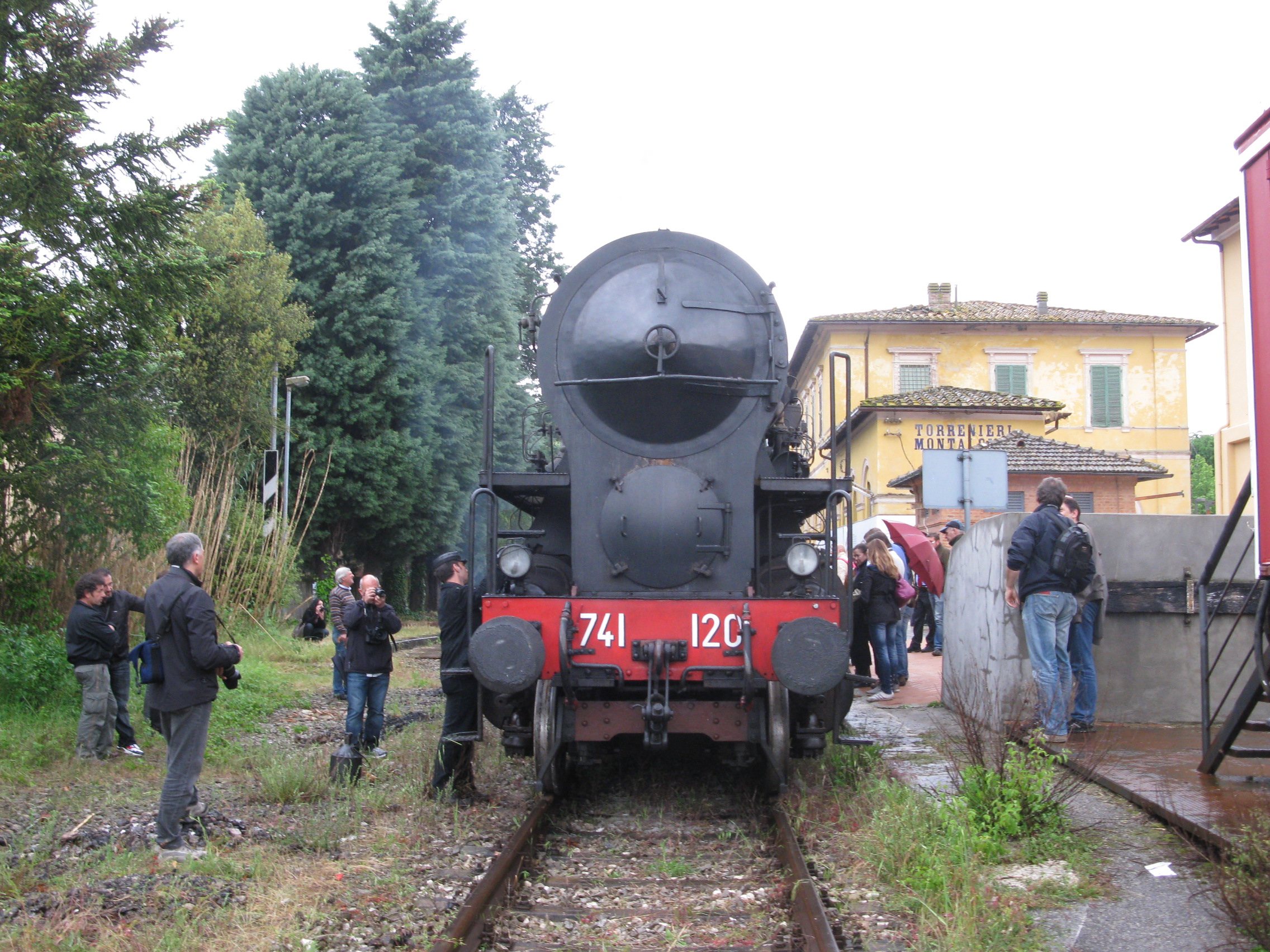
Tourist train on the Asciano–Monte Antico railway in Italy

- Bernina Railway, in the Rhaetian Railway between Italy and Switzerland; inscribed in the World Heritage List of UNESCO
- Valmorea railway
- Ferrovia dei Parchi, in Abruzzo region
- Cosenza-Camigliatello–San Giovanni in Fiore railway
- Avellino–Rocchetta Sant'Antonio railway
- Gemona del Friuli–Sacile railway
- Palazzolo–Paratico railway
- Ceva–Ormea railway
- Mandas–Arbatax railway
- Isili–Sorgono railway
- Sassari–Tempio-Palau railway
- Macomer–Bosa railway
- Alcantara–Randazzo railway
- Castelvetrano–Porto Empedocle railway
- Noto–Pachino railway
- Asciano–Monte Antico railway
- Civitavecchia–Orte railway
- Fano–Urbino railway
- Chivasso–Asti railway
- Castagnole–Asti-Mortara railway
- Alessandria–Cavallermaggiore railway
- Novara–Varallo railway
- Urbino–Fabriano railway
- Sicignano degli Alburni–Lagonegro railway
- Rocchetta Sant'Antonio–Gioia del Colle railway
- Cuneo–Mondovì railway

== See also ==
- List of Italian railways
- List of heritage railways
