= Nichelino =

Nichelino Ël Niclin (Piedmontese)
- Comune
- City of Italy
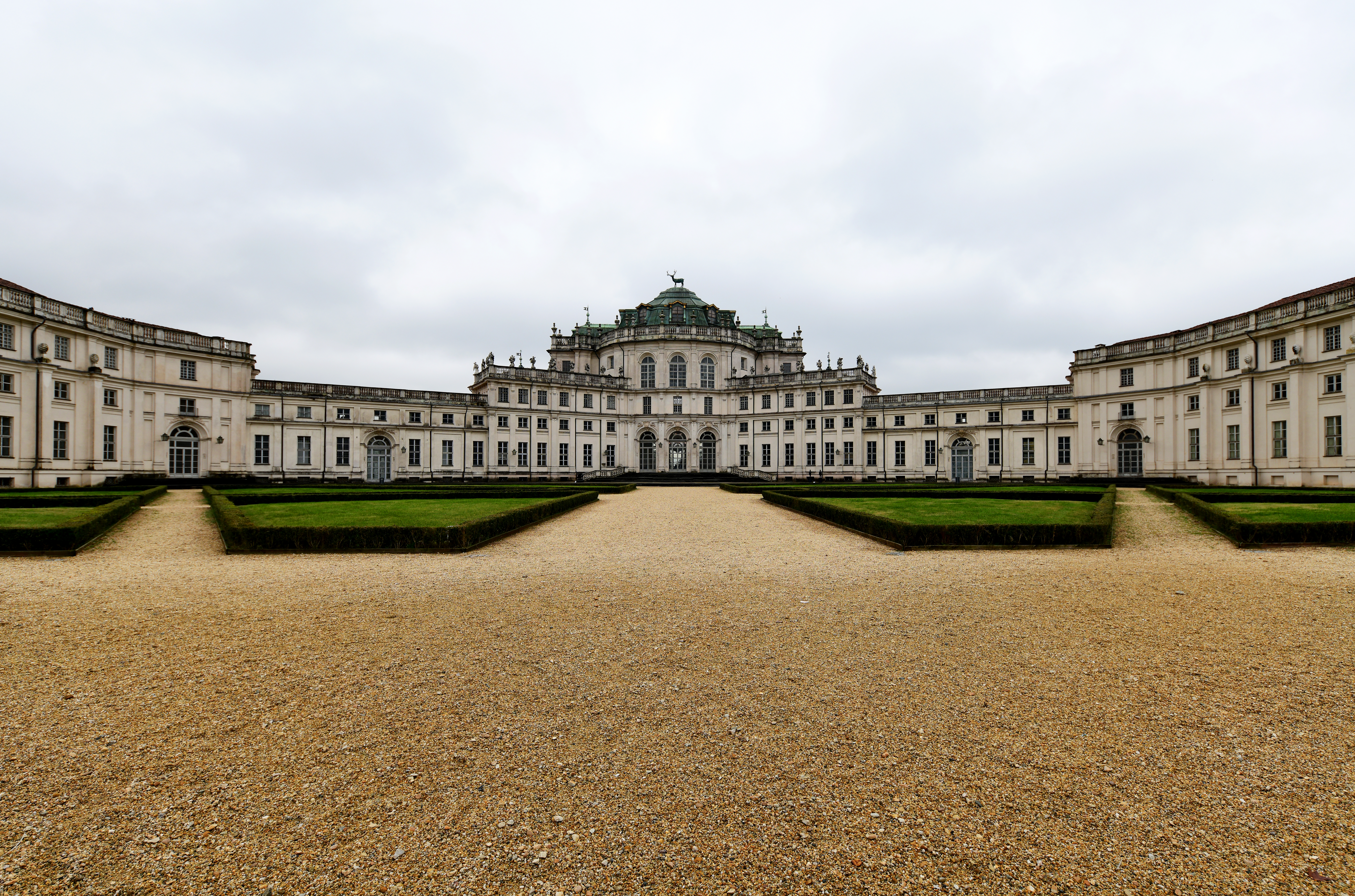
- The Palazzina di caccia of Stupinigi (Residence of the royal house of Savoy)

- Coat of arms

- Location within Italy Location within Piedmont
- Coordinates: 45°0′N 7°39′E
- Country: Italy
- Region: Piedmont
- Metropolitan city: Turin (TO)
- Frazioni: Stupinigi

Government
  - Mayor: Giampiero Tolardo

Area
  - Total: 20.56 km^{2} (7.94 sq mi)
- Elevation: 229 m (751 ft)

Population (30 November 2017)
  - Total: 47,760
  - Density: 2,323/km^{2} (6,016/sq mi)
- Demonym: Nichelinese (pl. -i)
- Time zone: UTC+1 (CET)
  - Summer (DST): UTC+2 (CEST)
- Postal code: 10042
- Dialing code: 011
- Patron saint: St. Matthew
- Saint day: 21 September
- Website: Official website

Nichelino (Piedmontese: Ël Niclin) is a comune (municipality) in the Metropolitan City of Turin in the Italian region of Piedmont, located about 8 kilometres (5 miles) southwest of Turin.

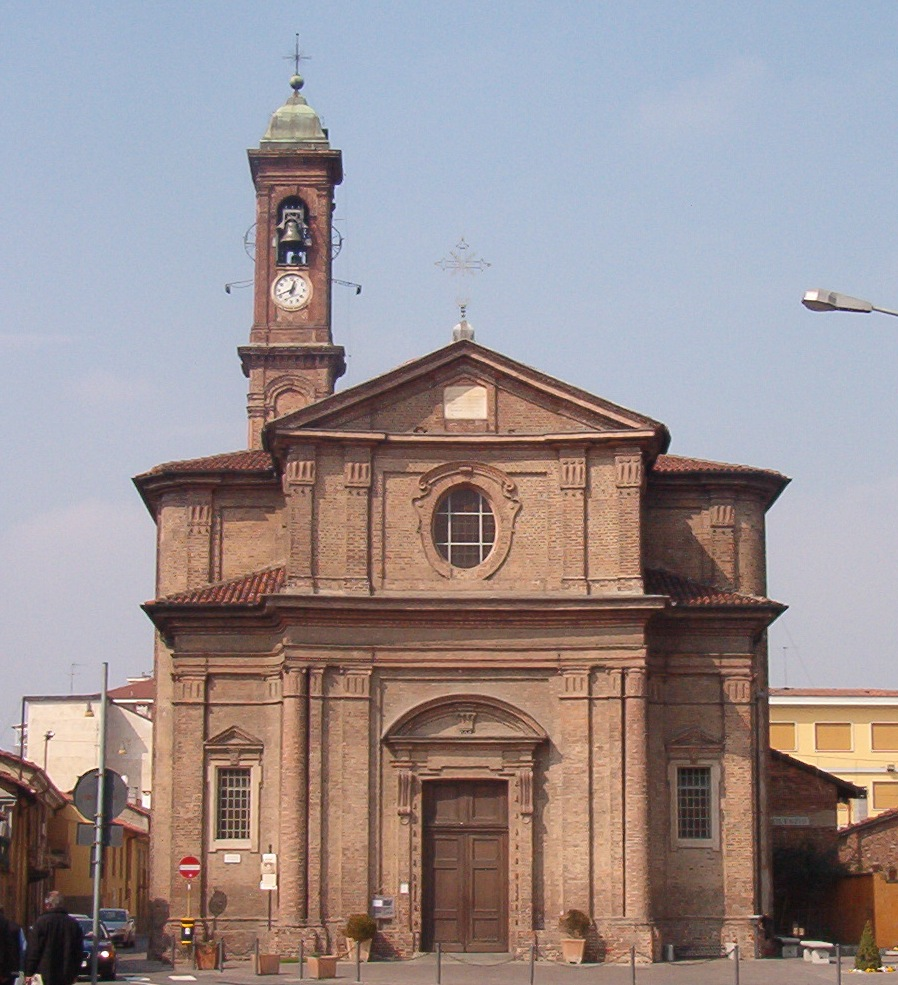
Santissima Trinità Church.

Nichelino borders the following municipalities: Turin, Orbassano, Beinasco, Moncalieri, Candiolo, and Vinovo.

== History ==
=== Early History: Roman Era to the 16th century ===
During Roman times, Nichelino served as a transit point on the road leading to the Alps and France. The first historical records describe Nichelino as a hamlet under the jurisdiction of the neighboring town of Moncalieri. Ancient maps show the lands along the Sangone River as part of Moncalieri's possessions. These references continue until the 17th century, when the Occelli family began laying the groundwork for Nichelino's development.

The late 16th century was marked by tragedy, as the plague became the dominant event in the local chronicles. The first recorded case occurred in 1586 at Palazzo Darmelli, with Borgata Palazzo identified as the epicenter of the epidemic. Twenty suspected plague spreaders were imprisoned and executed in Piazza Castello in Turin. The plague persisted in the area until the late 17th century.

=== The Occelli Family and the Establishment of the *Feudo di Nichelino* ===
The Occelli family, originating from Cuneo, rose to prominence in the Turin region in the latter half of the 16th century. Their connection to Nichelino began on 22 June 1694, when Vittorio Amedeo II granted a royal patent to Count Niccolò Manfredo Occelli and his heirs, establishing the *Feudo di Nichilino*. To earn the title of Counts of Nichelino, the Occelli family paid "ten thousand lire" to the royal treasury.

The feudal privileges included noble titles, justice administration, hunting and fishing rights on the Sangone River, control over agricultural activities, and management of tolls. The official establishment of the feudal estate occurred on 21 August 1694. In 1705, amidst a war with France, Count Niccolò Manfredo paid an additional "thousand lire" to secure the right to appoint local mayors. However, the Occelli family's influence waned after Niccolò Manfredo's death, and the rival Umoglio family began to gain prominence.

=== 18th–19th Century: Umoglio Family and French Influence ===
With the death of Niccolò Manfredo Occelli, the Umoglio family, Counts of Vernea and Pramollo, assumed significant public roles. During the early 19th century, Nichelino, like much of Piedmont, experienced the cultural and administrative influence of French annexation. Despite these changes, the Umoglio family retained local power, holding the mayoral office in 1833.

Key developments during this period include the relocation of the cemetery in 1836 and the introduction of female teachers in 1854, who began to work alongside priests traditionally responsible for education. Additionally, the arrival of the first train on the Turin–Pinerolo railway line on 27 July 1854, marked a significant milestone in the city's modernization.

=== 20th Century – Immigration and Workers' Struggles ===
After World War II, Nichelino was profoundly influenced by Italy's post-war economic boom. As a satellite city of Turin, it experienced rapid population growth due to a wave of immigration driven by FIAT's industrial expansion. By 1961, the population had doubled compared to the previous decade, rising from 7,257 in 1951 to 14,907. This growth accelerated in the 1960s and 1970s, reaching 44,837 in 1971 and peaking at nearly 50,000 in 1974.

However, this rapid urbanization led to housing shortages and social tensions. On 12 June 1969, workers, students, and tenant associations united to protest rising rents, forming committees to organize resistance. The movement culminated in the occupation of the city council chambers on 13 June 1969, lasting 13 days. This protest, led by the student movement and local Communist Party representatives, aimed to freeze rent increases and improve housing conditions.

The municipality eventually responded by offering free tenant assistance services and committing to the construction of public housing. These efforts marked the beginning of Nichelino's transformation into a modern urban community, addressing the needs of its growing working-class population.

== Main sights ==
The frazione of Stupinigi houses the famous Palazzina di Stupinigi, part of the UNESCO list of World Heritage Sites. The castle, also known as Palazzo Occelli (1565), is also notable.

== Twin towns ==
- Caluire-et-Cuire, France
- Victoria, Malta, Malta
