= Saluzzo railway station =

Railway station in Saluzzo, Italy

Saluzzo
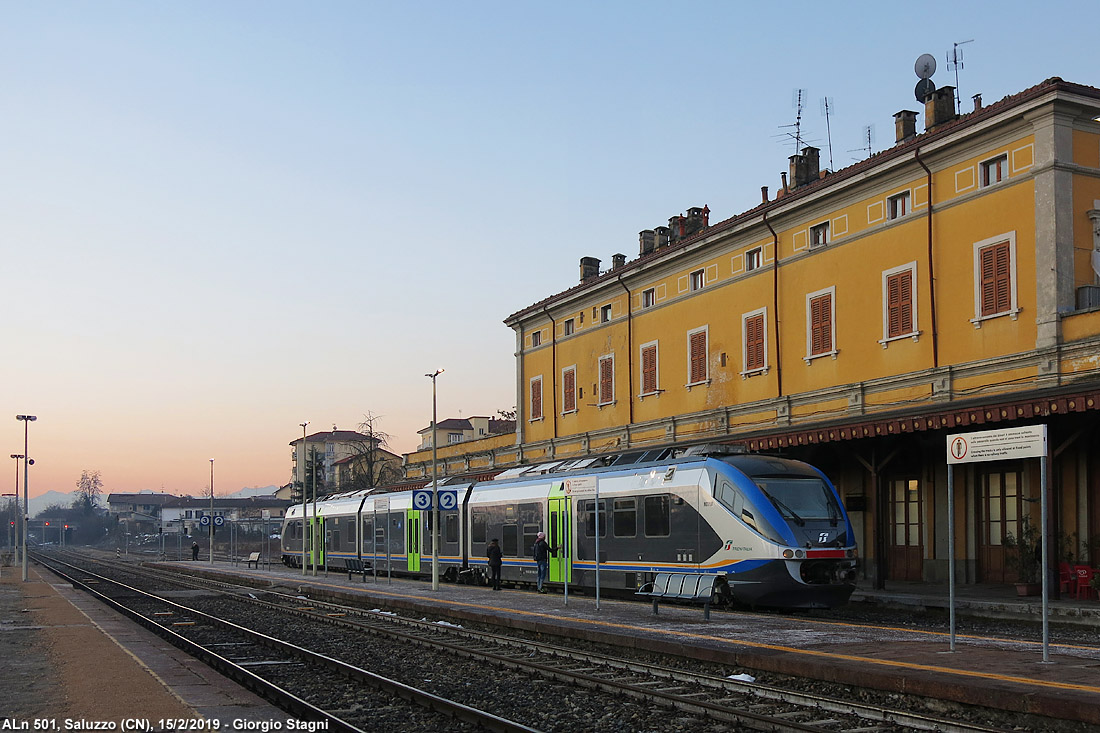

General information
- Location: Piazza Vittorio Veneto, 8, 12037 Saluzzo CN, Italy
- Coordinates: 44.642°N 7.498°E
- Elevation: 350m
- Operated by: Trenitalia; Arenaways (January 27, 2025)
- Managed by: Rete Ferroviaria Italiana
- Lines: Airasca–Saluzzo railway line (defunct); Savigliano–Saluzzo–Cuneo railway line (active)
- Platforms: 3
- Tracks: 5
- Train operators: Arenaways

Other information
- Status: In use

History
- Opened: 1 January 1893

Key dates
- 1986: Airasca–Saluzzo railway line closed
- 2012: Suspension of passenger trains on the Savigliano–Saluzzo–Cuneo railway line
- 2019: Resumption of passenger trains on the Savigliano–Saluzzo–Cuneo railway line
- 2020: Passenger trains on the Savigliano–Saluzzo–Cuneo railway line suspended again due to COVID-19 pandemic in Italy
- 2025: Resumption of passenger trains on the Savigliano–Saluzzo–Cuneo railway line
Location

Saluzzo railway station (Italian: Stazione di Saluzzo) is the principal station serving the town of Saluzzo in the Piedmont Region. The station is located on the Savigliano-Saluzzo-Cuneo railway line, operating since 1893 (replacing an older station built in 1857) but has suspended services on two occasions: in June 2012 (until January 2019) and March 2020 (until January 2025). It has since reopened for passenger services from January 27, 2025.

== History ==
The first railway station serving Saluzzo was a different building, established on January 1, 1857. In 1859 the Italian state took over the operation of the aforementioned line and station, later entrusting it to the SFAI (Italian: Società per le strade ferrate dell'Alta Italia).

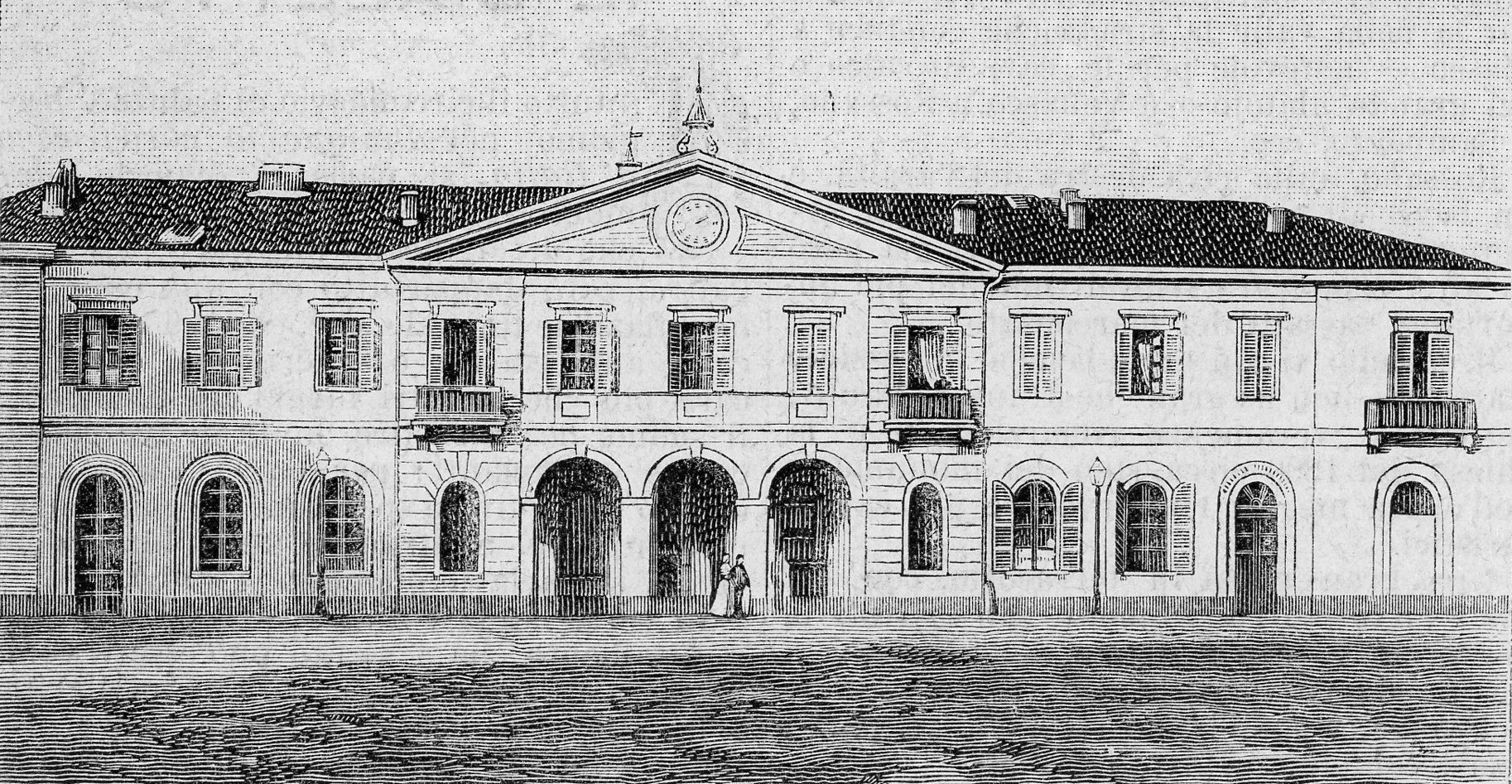
Woodcut illustration of the original Saluzzo railway station

On July 1, 1885, ownership of the SFAI network was taken over by a new organization, with the portion of the network containing Saluzzo railway station now being managed by Rete Mediterranea.

On June 1, 1892, the line to Cuneo was in operation, provisionally through a regress from the Savigliano line.

On June 1, 1893, the original station was replaced by the present station, located east of the town. More tracks and a passing loop are featured at the new station. The original railway station building can still be seen at Piazza Cavour, Saluzzo's town square.

In 1986, the Airasca–Saluzzo line was closed.

On June 17, 2012, due to timetable change passenger transport was suspended on the Savigliano-Saluzzo-Cuneo line, which remained active for freight traffic only.

=== Redevelopment plans ===
On December 2, 2015, "Bus Company Srl." formally became the owner of a plot of land adjacent to the station building for a sum of 241 thousand euros. The land was formerly a freight yard belonging to the FS company. It is intended that the land be redeveloped into the future headquarters of Movicentro di Saluzzo and Bus Company Srl.

In 2019, Piazza Cavalieri di Vittorio Veneto, the square in front of the Saluzzo railway station and surrounding areas, was scheduled for redevelopment. Architect Gianmarco Abitabile, presented the plan to the municipal administration for the construction of Movicentro, an integrated bus and railway hub. The project is set to be developed in the former FS freight yard, located behind the Beauregard condominium.

=== Brief service restoration and suspension ===
Passenger services were restored only in the Savigliano direction on January 7, 2019, and suspended again in March 2020 due to low ridership during the COVID-19 pandemic in Italy.

=== Service restoration ===
On March 27, 2024, Piedmont Region President Alberto Cirio announced that the entire line, including the Saluzzo station, will be reopened to rail traffic in January 2025. The railway will be operated by Arenaways trains, and an investment of about 40 million euros is expected for the line's reinvigoration.

On January 27, 2025, passenger traffic reopens on the Savigliano–Saluzzo–Cuneo railway line.

== Services ==
The station is served by regional trains terminating at Cuneo and Savigliano. Arenaways operate the trains as part of PSO contracts with the Piedmont local government. Arenaways serves the station with its Savigliano–Saluzzo–Cuneo railway line. This is operated using three-car Pesa ATR 220 diesel multiple units.

== Future development ==
In addition to previous plans to redevelop the station square, the station building itself is slated for renovation, which has fallen into disrepair after years of disuse. RFI has commissioned architect Silvia Migliarino to design a safety intervention for the station roof. Additionally, stratigraphic tests on the facade are planned, pending superintendency approval as of July 2024. Currently the station building is not open to the public and passengers have to access platforms via a side route.
