= Ferrovia dei Parchi =

Railway line in Italy

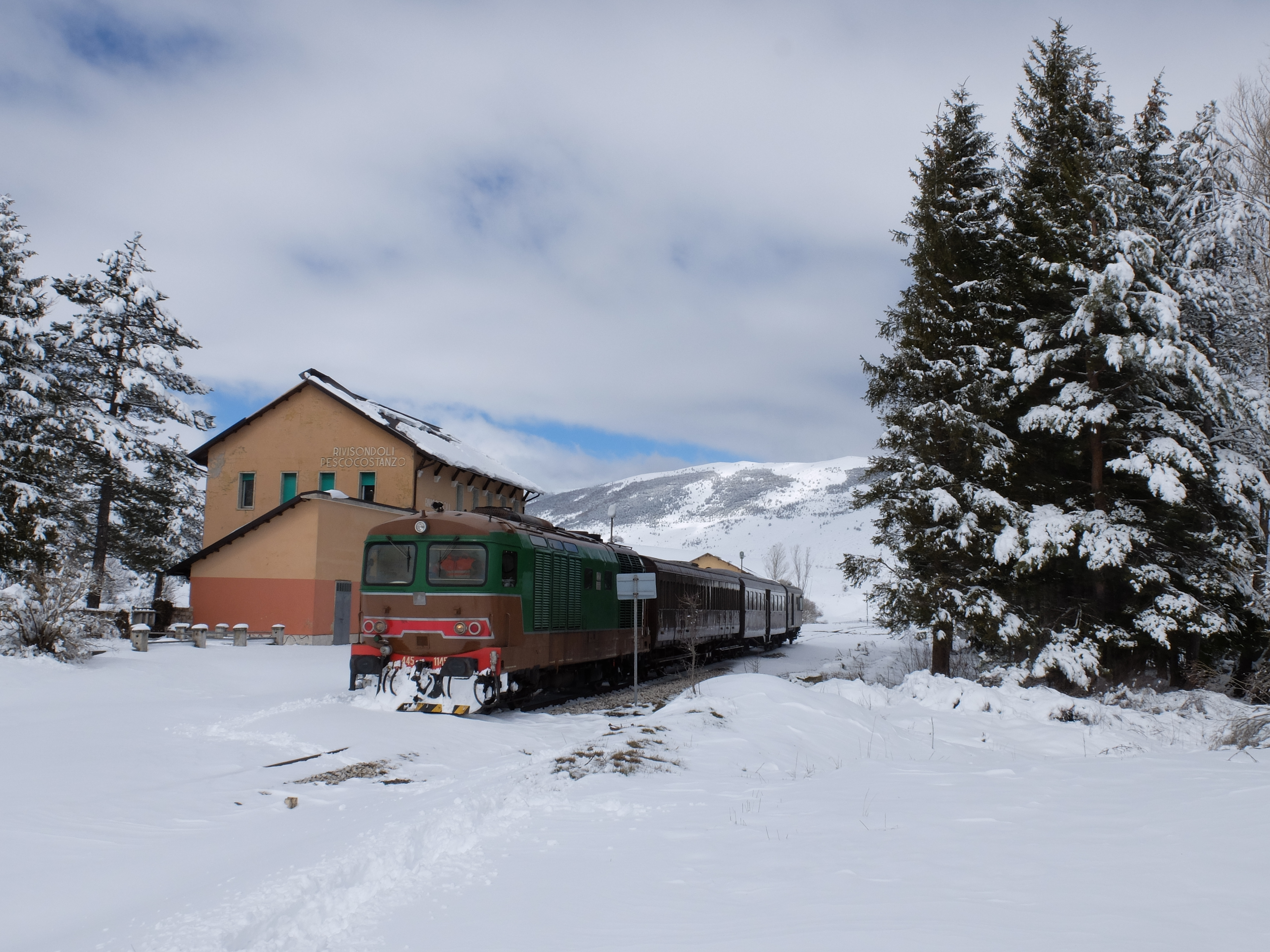

Overview
- Service type: Tourist train
- Status: Operational
- Locale: Abruzzo, Italy

Route
- Line used: Sulmona-Isernia
Route map
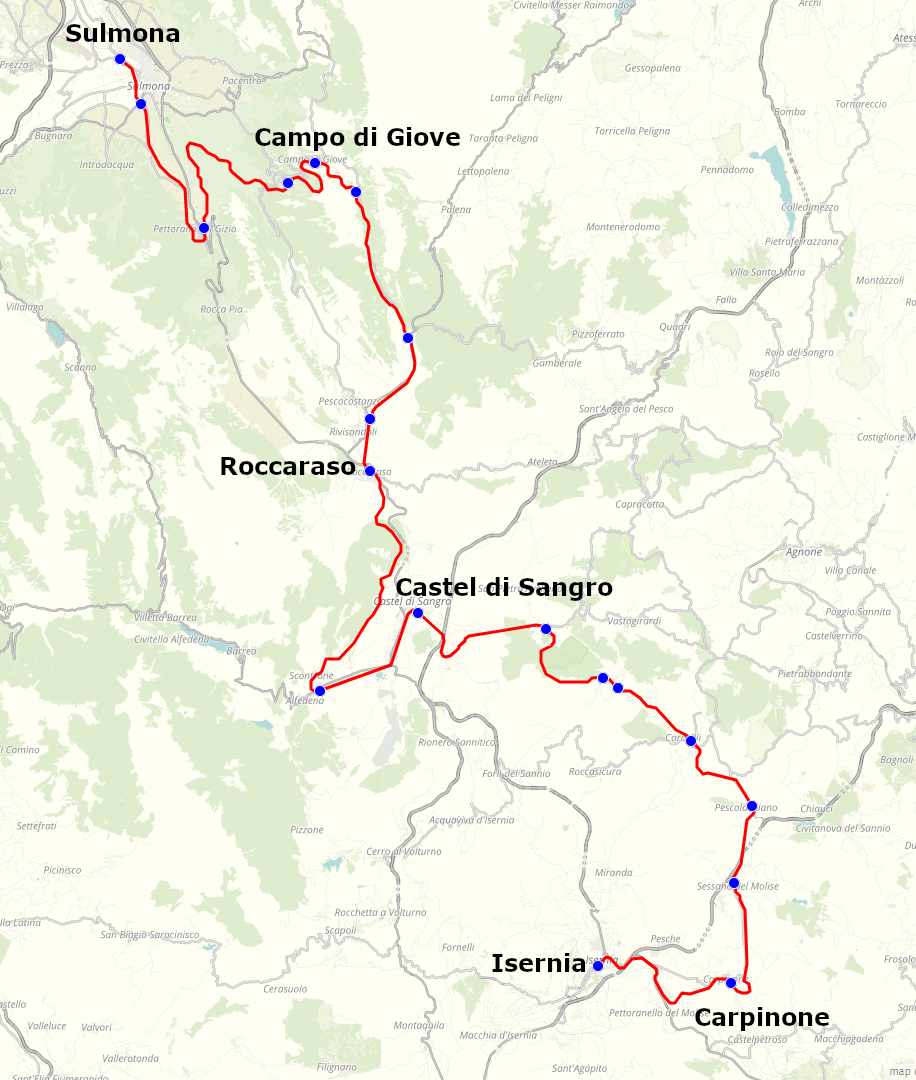
- Track railway service stations

Ferrovia dei Parchi (""Railway of the Parks"" in English) is a rail tourism service in Abruzzo and Molise, Italy .

The service operates along the Sulmona-Isernia railway, which was suspended from ordinary operation on October 11, 2010 in the Molise section and on December 10, 2011 in the Abruzzese section and reopened entirely on 17 May 2014 as a tourist railway by Fondazione FS Italiane. "Railway of the Parks" is also the nickname by which this railway line is known, after that of "Trans-Siberian Railway of Italy".

== Lines ==
The service's rolling stock travels along the of the Sulmona-Isernia railway, passing through, in addition to the terminus cities of Sulmona and Isernia, also various inland municipalities of Abruzzo and Molise such as Cansano, Campo di Giove, Palena, Pescocostanzo, Roccaraso, Castel di Sangro, San Pietro Avellana, Capracotta, Carovilli, Roccasicura and Carpinone. In particular, this route, after crossing part of the territory of the Maiella National Park and the major plateaus of Abruzzo, reaches its peak at the Rivisondoli-Pescocostanzo station; it is the second highest railway station of the standard railway gauge lines of the Italian railway network after that of the Brenner railway station, as well as the third if the narrow gauge lines are also considered.

== See also ==
- Tourism in Abruzzo
- History of rail transport in Italy
- List of railway stations in Abruzzo
- Rail transport in Italy
- IT.A.CÀ - Festival of Responsible Tourism
