= Chivasso–Asti railway =

Chivasso-Asti railway

Overview
- Status: Tourist railway
- Locale: Piedmont, Italy
- Termini: Chivasso; Asti

Service
- Operator: Fondazione FS Italiane

Technical
- Line length: 51.316 km (31.886 mi)
- Track gauge: 1,435 mm (4 ft 8 1/2 in) standard gauge

The Chivasso–Asti railway (Italian: Ferrovia Chivasso-Asti) is a regional line that connects the railway hub of Chivasso along the Turin-Milan railway with Asti of the Turn-Genoa rail line. It is only used as a tourist railway.

The train service was officially suspended in 2012. Starting on May 15, 2022, the line has been restored for the transit of historic trains organized by Fondazione FS Italiane.

== Characteristics ==
The buildings of the Chivasso-Asti railway, dating back to the inauguration of the line, were designed by the Swiss architect J. Sutter based on traditional Piedmontese villas.
