= Airasca-Saluzzo railway line =

Railway line from Airasca to Saluzzo in Italy

Airasca-Saluzzo line
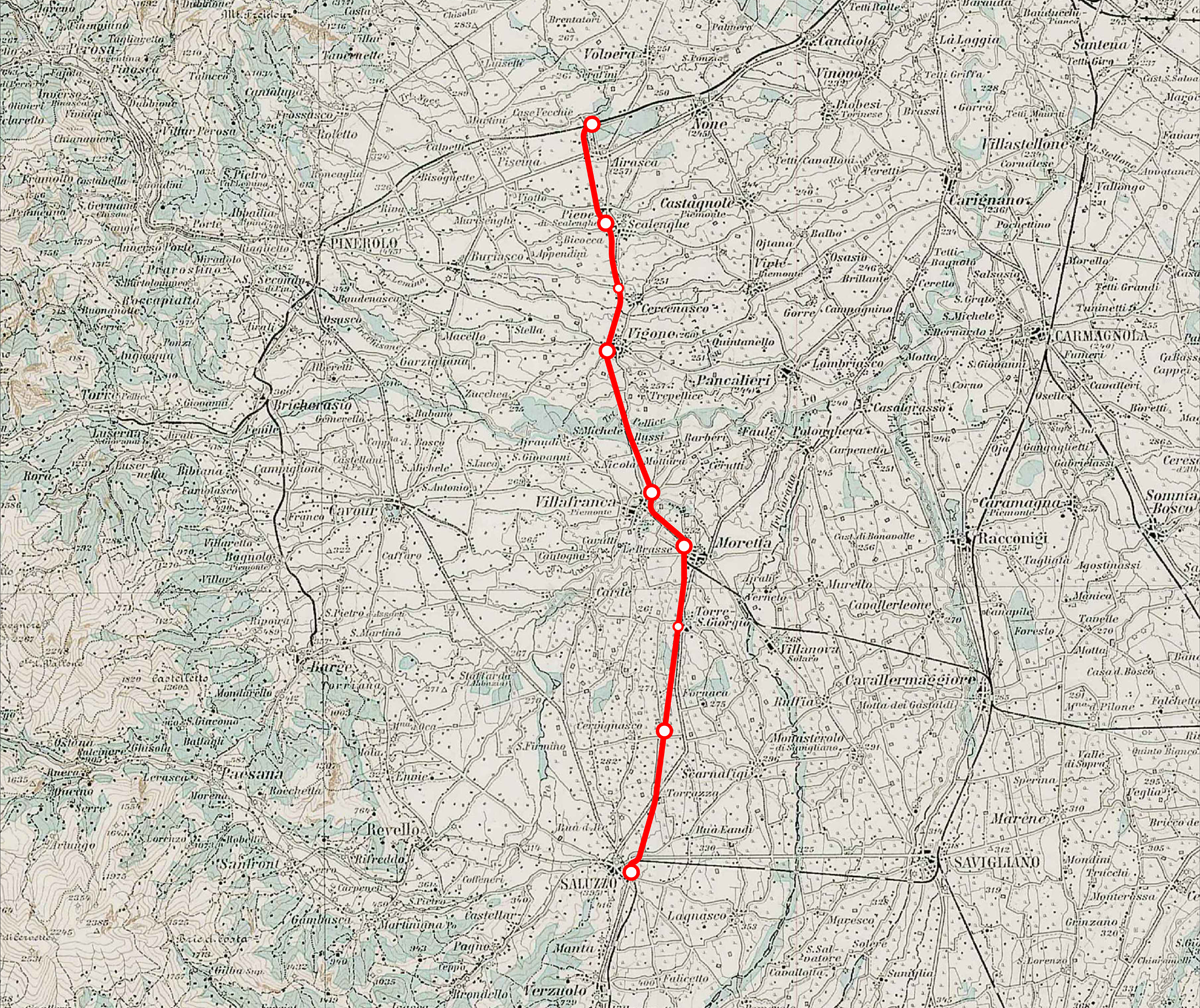

Overview
- Native name: Ferrovia Airasca-Saluzzo
- Status: Defunct
- Owner: Società per le strade ferrate dell'Alta Italia (1884–1885) Società per le Strade Ferrate del Mediterraneo (1885–1905) Rete Ferroviaria Italiana (1905–1986)
- Locale: Piedmont
- Termini: Airasca railway station; Saluzzo railway station
- Connecting lines: Moretta-Cavallermaggiore railway line
- Stations: 9

Service
- Type: Commuter rail

History
- Opened: 1886
- Closed: 1986

Technical
- Line length: 33 km (21 mi)
- Track gauge: 1,435 mm (4 ft 8 1/2 in) standard gauge
- Electrification: No

The Airasca-Saluzzo railway line was a regional passenger line that connected the cities of Airasca and Saluzzo. It ran southwards from Airasca railway station, through Moretta, and terminated at Saluzzo railway station. The line was in operation from 1886 to 1986.

== History ==
By Royal Decree of July 29, 1879, the Airasca-Moretta-Cavallermaggiore line and its Moretta-Saluzzo branch line, initially classified as "economic railways," were included among the complementary railways to be built in Piedmont.

Due to low demand, the railway was closed to passenger traffic on January 1, 1986.

In 2011, a bicycle path, called Via delle Risorgive, was built taking advantage of the railroad bed on the Airasca-Moretta section.

In future plans, the Moretta-Saluzzo section of the line will also be converted into a bicycle path as per the request of local governments with its inclusion in the Eurovelo 8 project.
