= Acqui Terme railway station =

Railway station in Italy

Acqui Terme
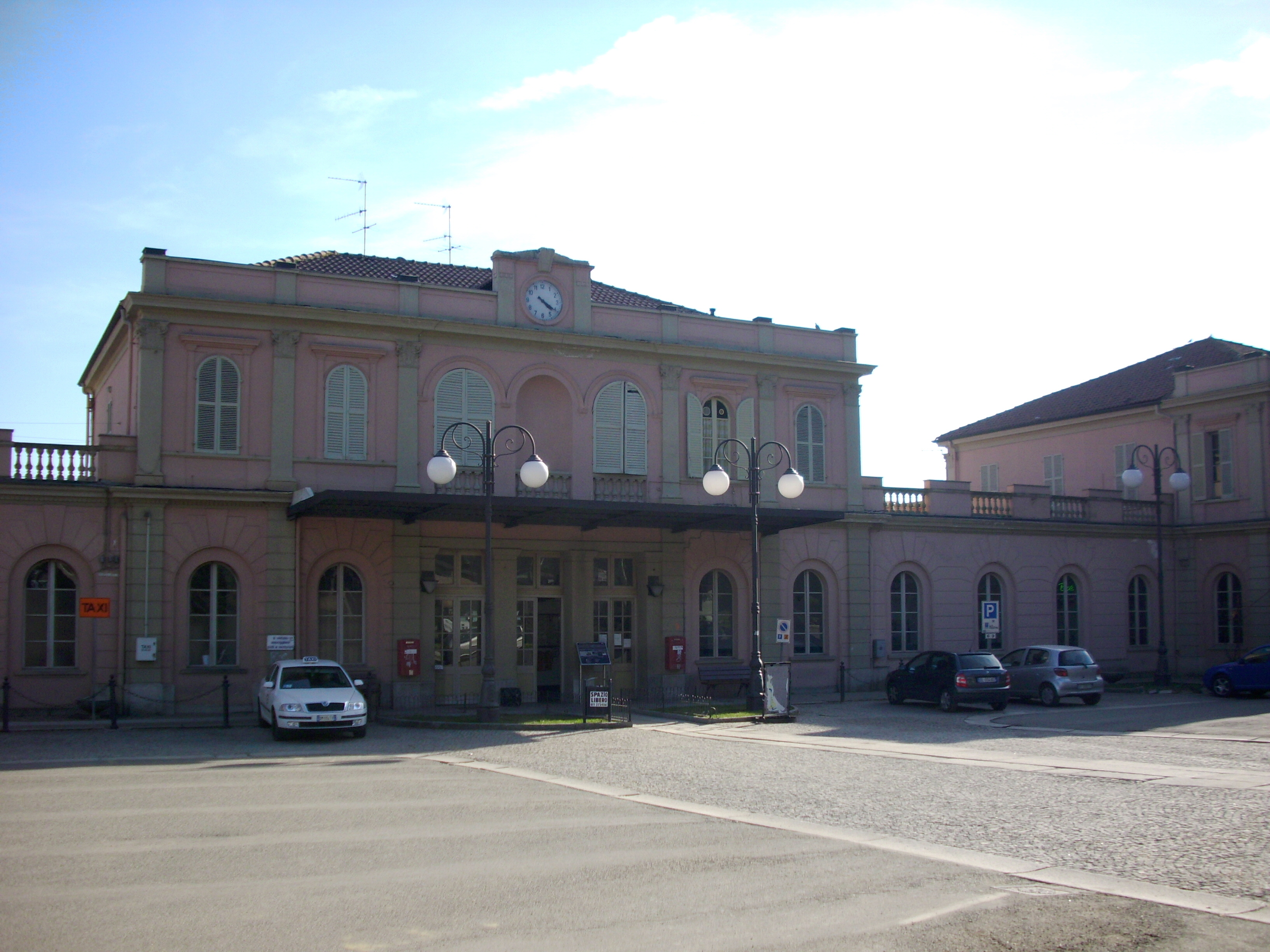

General information
- Location: Piazza Vittorio Veneto, Acqui Terme; Acqui Terme, Alessandria, Piedmont; Italy
- Coordinates: 44°40′21″N 08°28′04″E
- Elevation: At Grade
- Owner: Rete Ferroviaria Italiana
- Operator: Rete Ferroviaria Italiana
- Lines: Asti – Genova; Alessandria - San Giuseppe di Cairo
- Platforms: 2 Island Platforms
- Tracks: 4
- Train operators: Trenitalia

Other information
- Classification: Silver

History
- Opened: 1858
Location
- Location within Piedmont Location within Northern Italy Location within Italy

Acqui Terme railway station (Italian: Stazione di Acqui Terme) serves the town and comune of Acqui Terme, in the Piedmont region of northwestern Italy.

The Acqui Terme station is the railway station of the Acqui Terme. At this stop, the Asti-Genoa railway crosses with the Alessandria-San Giuseppe di Cairo.

It is located in Piazza Vittorio Veneto near the historic center of the town.

== History ==
The station was opened on January 3 1858, when the railway section for Alessandria was inaugurated. The plant remained open until 1874, when the continuation to San Giuseppe di Cairo was opened for operation. In 1893 the station was reached by the Asti – Ovada, first section of the line to Genoa. On 25 May 1976, the last three-phase AC railway electrification train, hauled by the E.432.008, arrived at this station. A few minutes from the arrival, the E.432 lowered the pantographs and direct current was introduced into the now formerly three-phase two-wire overhead line. According to the 2003 line files, the route of the historic Asti-Genoa line is now divided into two lines, the Asti–Acqui Terme and Acqui Terme–Ovada-Genoa.

== Structure and Layout ==
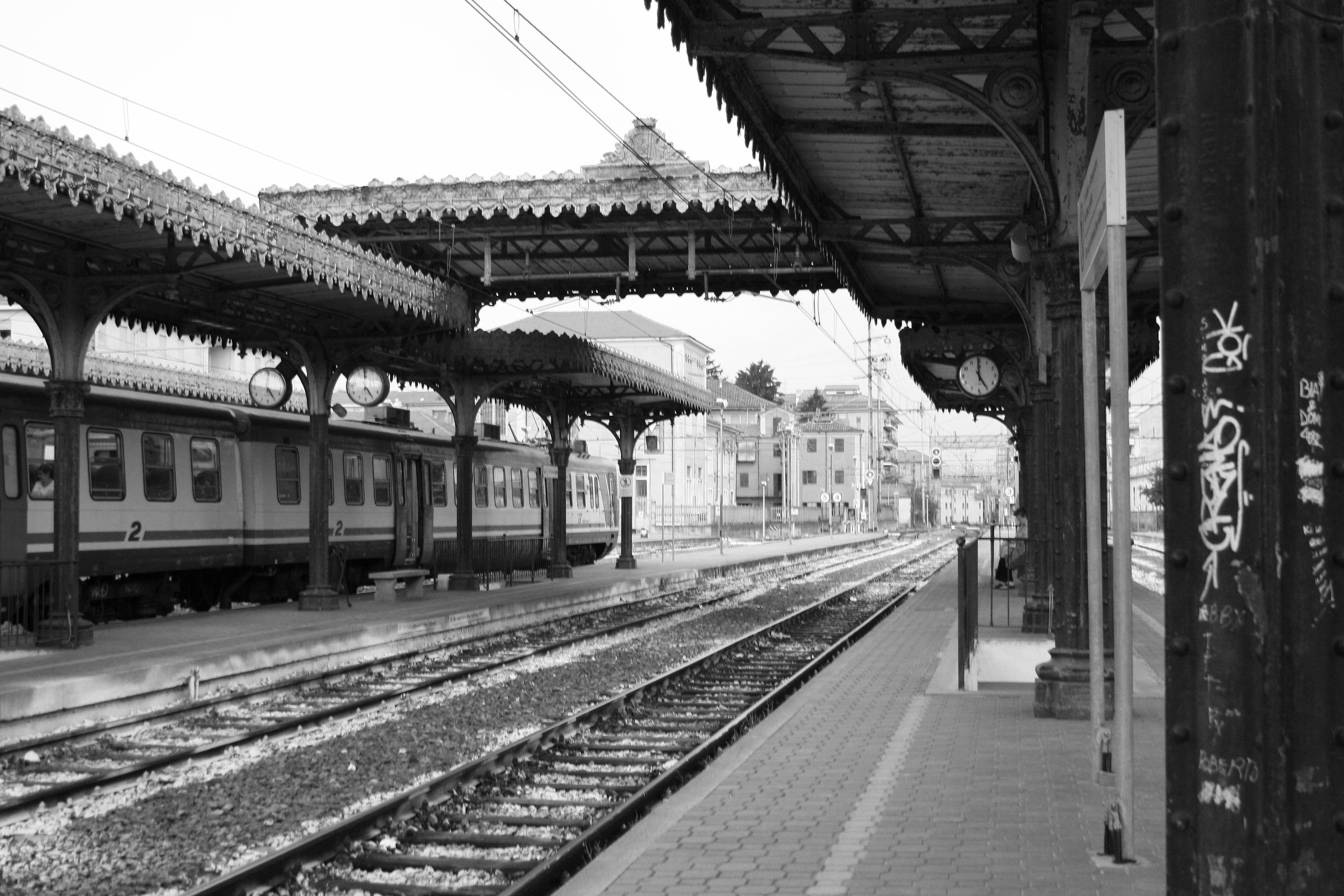
Interior of the Acqui Terme station, the historic metal canopies that date back to the three-phase years are evident.

The plant is managed by Rete Ferroviaria Italiana (RFI); the orientation of the track park is in an East-West direction: from the East the two single tracks of the lines for Alessandria (from the North-East) and for Ovada-Genova (from the South-East) enter, while towards the West they exit parallel, to separate several hundred meters further on, the two tracks destined for Asti (North side) and S.Giuseppe di Cairo-Savona (South side). The tracks intended for passenger traffic are eight in all: six passers-by, numbered from 1 to 6, a section numbered 1a and attested to the east side of the passenger building, sharing a part of the platform with track 1, and another track with regular numbering (7), which crosses the square like the other six but which is truncated as it has no outlet to the west. Both for these and for track 1a, use is therefore limited to trains that have their origin or destination in the station itself and are directed to one of the two destinations to the east, particularly the regional ones for Genoa which generates a moderate commuter traffic.

Beyond the passenger beam, there is a modest rail beam parallel to it, used for parking and shunting.

The station has a relatively recent pedestrian underpass.

The 19th-century metal canopies have remained in place to cover the platforms of the first 7 platforms.

In the square in front of the station there are stops and terminus for urban and suburban buses ARFEA, SAAMO and Gelosobus. The terminus of the bus lines and substitute services provided by bus is located at the Movicentro, located in a position adjacent to the passenger building and equipped with parking.

== Services ==
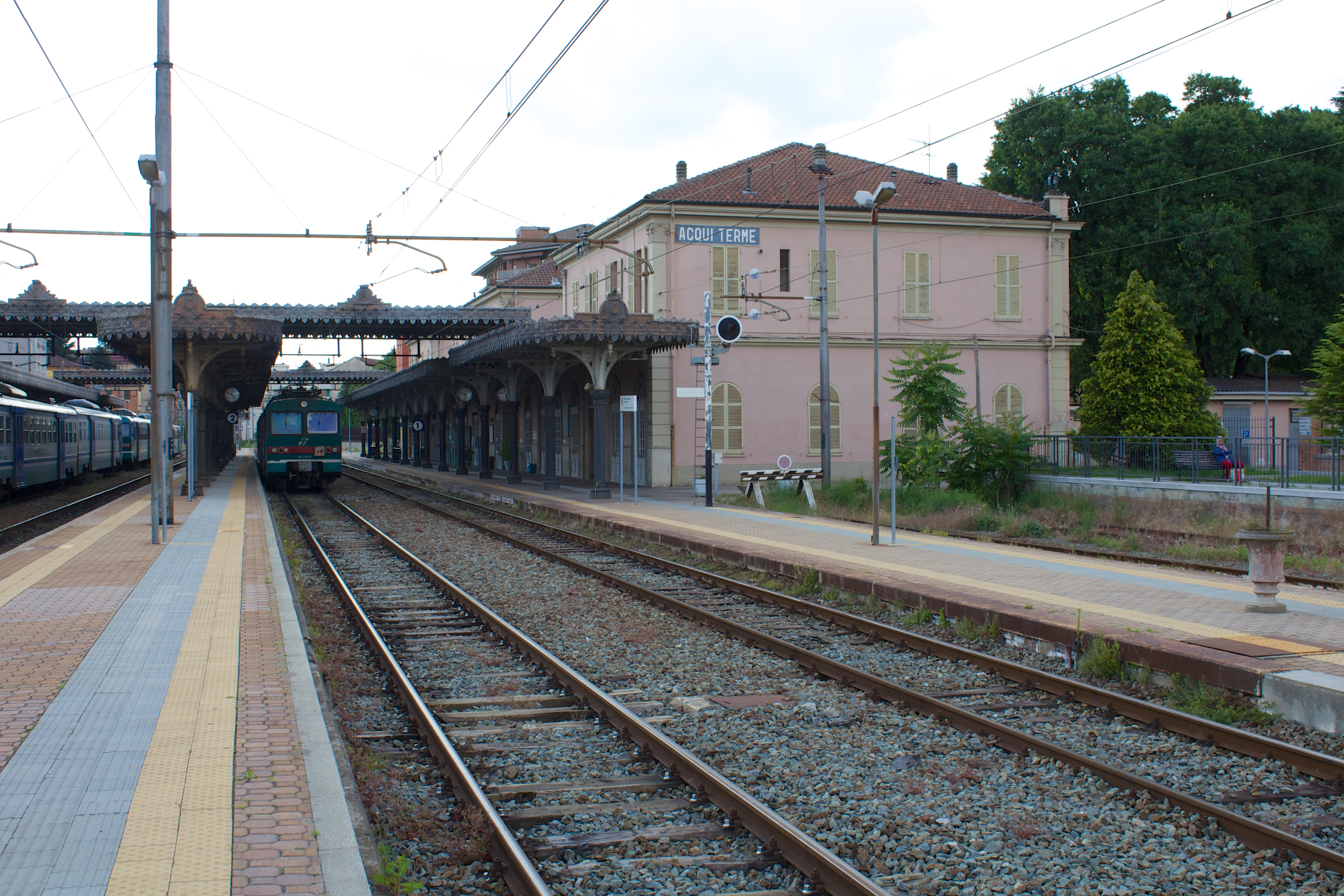
Station platform square

The station, which RFI classifies in the ''silver'' category, has:

- Ticket office at the counter
- Automatic ticket office
- Waiting room
- Bar
- Bathrooms
- Fermata autobus
