= Bricherasio–Barge Railway =

Former railway line in Piedmont, Italy

Bricherasio–Barge railway

Overview
- Native name: Ferrovia Bricherasio-Barge
- Status: Closed
- Locale: Piedmont, Italy
- Termini: Bricherasio; Barge
- Stations: 4

Service
- Type: Regional rail
- Operator(s): Genio ferrovieri (initially); FS (1905–1984)

History
- Opened: 6 September 1885
- Closed: 1 July 1984 (complete closure); 1966 (passenger); 1970 (freight)

Technical
- Line length: 11.699 km (7.269 mi)
- Track gauge: 1,435 mm (4 ft 8 1/2 in)
- Electrification: 3,600 V AC (1921–1961); 3,000 V DC (1961–1966)

The Bricherasio–Barge railway was a regional railway line in Piedmont, Italy. It was opened in 1885 for the transport of quartz ore and later used for passenger service until its decommissioning in 1984.

== History ==
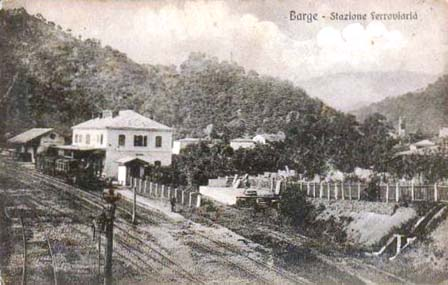
Barge railway station

The main purpose of its construction at the time was the transport of stone materials ([notably quartz at Bagnolo, quartzite at Barge) extracted in the area between Barge and Bagnolo Piemonte, in order to promote more intensive exploitation of the deposits and increase exports to various European countries. To this end, a private consortium commissioned engineer Soldati in 1877 to draw up a preliminary design for a railway between Bricherasio and Barge as a branch of the line then under construction. This work enabled the technical office supervising the construction of the Moretta-Cavallermaggiore Railway to prepare the executive project, presented in February 1882, and the works were contracted on 15 May of the same year.

The works, with a total cost of 1,900,000 lire, were awarded to the Morosetti company of Voghera on 25 February 1883 and completed in September 1885, one year late due to expropriation procedures and difficulties encountered in building the bridge over the Pellice. The official inauguration took place on 6 September 1885 in the presence of local authorities.

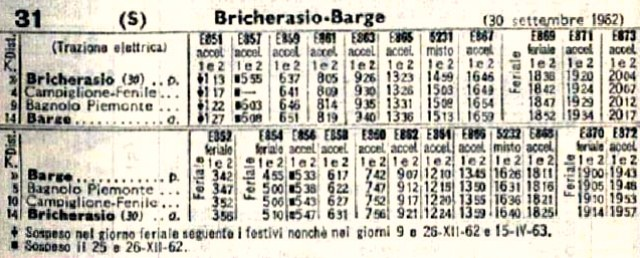
1962 passenger timetable

Regular service began the following day and was operated with steam traction by the Railway Engineer Corps, which used it for troop training; traffic remained low from the beginning of the 20th century. From 1905 it was incorporated into the State Railways.

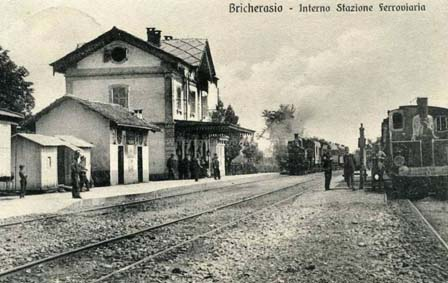
Bricherasio railway station

In 1921 it was electrified together with the connecting lines using three-phase alternating current at 3,600 volts, and operated with this system until 28 May 1961, when it was converted, along with the other lines serving the Turin junction, to the 3,000 volt direct current system.

In 1966, passenger rail service on the line was suppressed despite protests and replaced by a bus service; this was followed in 1970 by the cessation of freight service in implementation of directives concerning the so-called "dry branches" (rami secchi). The railway was consequently de-electrified.

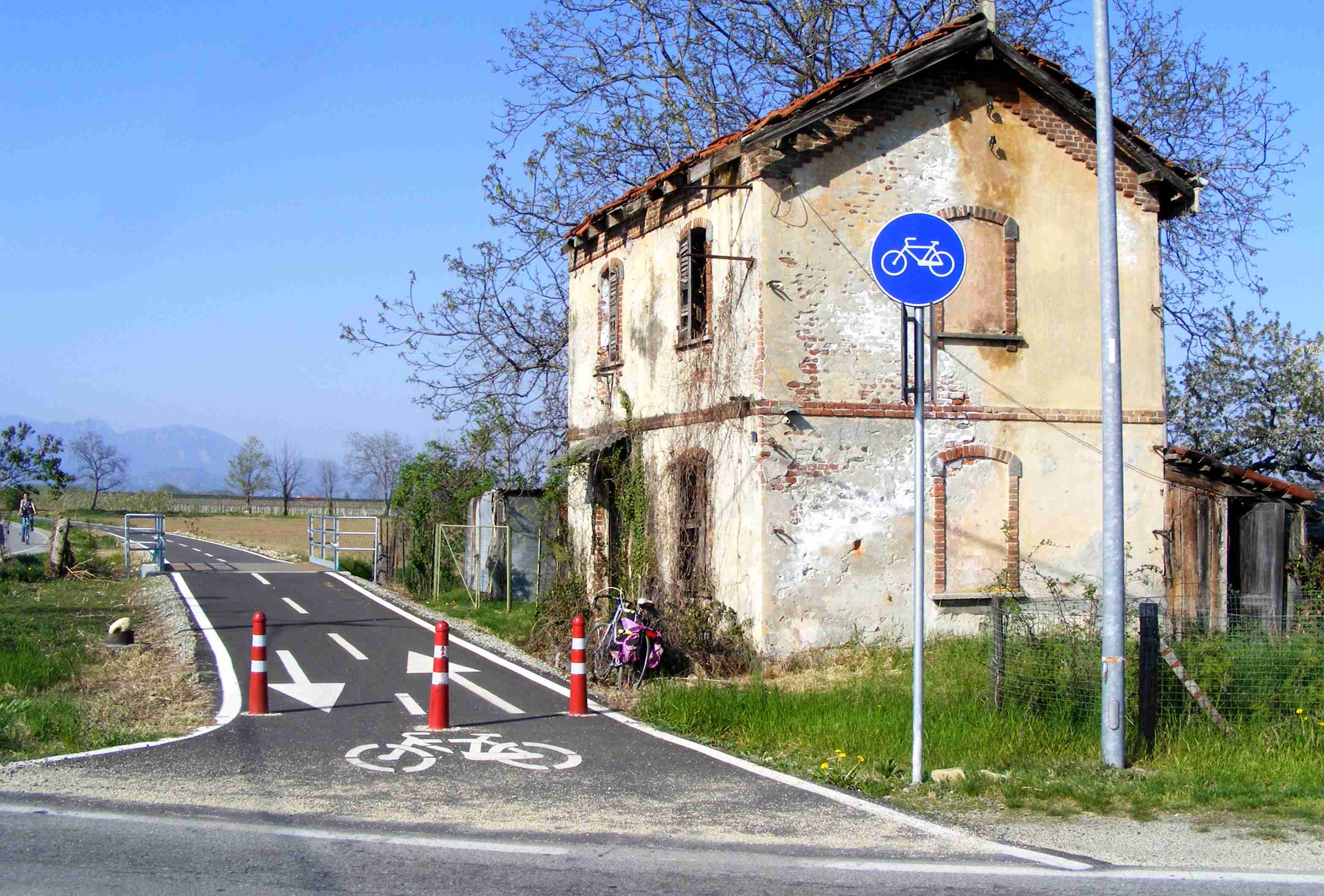
The cycle path built on the railway trackbed at Campiglione-Fenile

After the facilities were decommissioned in 1983, the line was definitively closed to traffic with effect from 1 July 1984, as provided by the Decree of the President of the Republic of 18 April 1984.

== Characteristics ==
The standard-gauge, single-track railway was 11.699 km long and had no particularly rugged profile, with an average gradient of 4 per thousand. The proportion of curved sections amounted to about 33%.

Numerous engineering works were built to cross waterways, the most important of which was the bridge over the Pellice stream.

Branching off from Bricherasio railway station and leaving the Pinerolo–Torre Pellice railway on the right, the line crossed the Pellice stream with a masonry bridge of five arches, each with a span of 16 metres, totalling 101 metres in length, to reach Campiglione-Fenile station.

== Rolling stock ==
Following electrification, train traction on the line was entrusted to E.550 three-phase locomotives, replaced from 1961 by E.400 and, finally, for passenger traffic, by ALe 840 electric multiple units.

== See also ==
- List of tram and light rail transit systems
- History of rail transport in Italy
- Moretta-Cavallermaggiore Railway

== Bibliography ==
- Luigi Ballatore (2002). Storia delle ferrovie in Piemonte [History of railways in Piedmont]. Turin: Editrice Il Punto. ISBN 88-88552-00-6.
- Kizi Blengino (September 2011). "Bricherasio-Barge, storia di una ferrovia" [Bricherasio-Barge, story of a railway]. Mondo Ferroviario (291): 10–11.
