= Chivasso–Alessandria railway =

Railway line in Piedmont, Italy

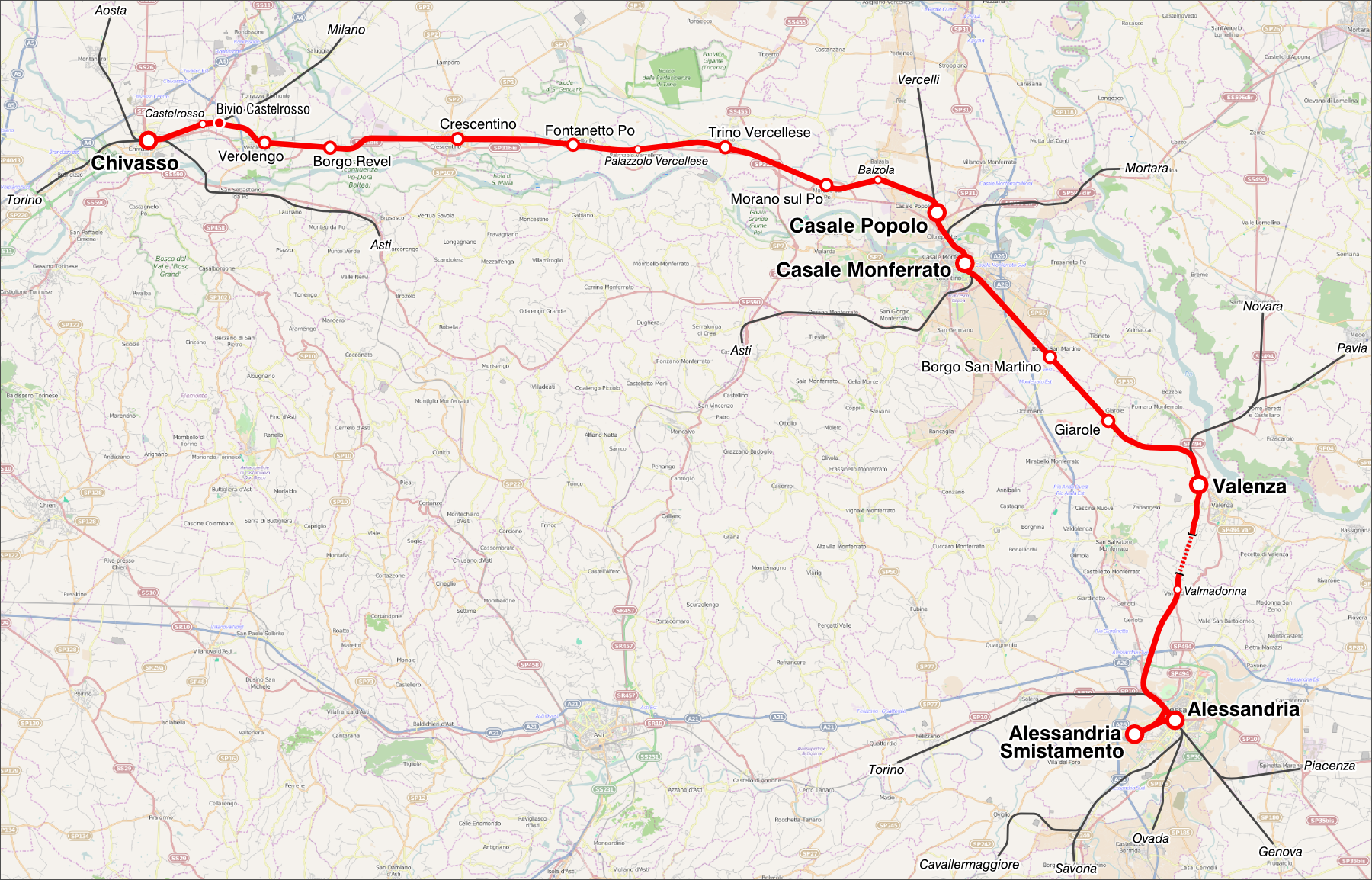

Overview
- Status: in use
- Owner: RFI
- Line number: 5
- Locale: Piedmont, Italy
- Termini: Chivasso; Alessandria

Service
- Type: Heavy rail
- Operator(s): Trenitalia

History
- Opened: 30 April 1887

Technical
- Track gauge: 1,435 mm (4 ft 8 1/2 in) standard gauge
- Electrification: 3 kV DC

The Chivasso–Alessandria railway is a railway line in Piedmont, Italy.

== History ==
The section from Valenza to Alessandria was opened on 5 June 1854 as part of the railway from Alessandria to Novara and Arona. The section from Casale Monferrato to Valenza was opened on 22 March 1857 as part of the railway from Vercelli to Valenza. The section from Chivasso to Casale came into operation on 30 April 1887.

== See also ==
- List of railway lines in Italy
