= Fondazione FS Italiane =

Italian railway foundation

- Founded: March 6, 2013; 13 years ago in Rome, Italy
- Founders: Ferrovie dello Stato Italiane, Trenitalia, RFI
- Headquarters: Rome, Italy
- Key people: Liberio Andreatta (President), Luigi Cantamessa (director general)
- Products: Historic and tourist trains

The Fondazione FS Italiane is a foundation constituting the companies Ferrovie dello Stato Italiane, Trenitalia and Rete Ferroviaria Italiana with the aim of enhancing and preserving the historical, technical, engineering and industrial heritage of the FS group.

== History ==
The foundation was created on March 6, 2013, on the initiative of Ferrovie dello Stato Italiane, Trenitalia and RFI.

== Governing bodies ==
The foundation's articles of association and statute were signed on March 6, 2013.

The direction of the foundation is handled by its president, Luigi Cantamessa.

== Other information ==
- Historical archive "Works and Construction Service": the formation of this archive is linked to the activities of Service XI (Maintenance and Surveillance) and Service XII (Construction) to which, with the legislative provisions of 1908 and 1909, the maintenance of the operating network and the new railway constructions were entrusted.
- Drawings Archive of the former Material and Traction Service: it has 260,000 technical drawings of locomotives and historic vehicles, over 500,000 of rolling stock in service and 10,000 photographic images, mainly glass plates dating back to the early twentieth century.
- Historical operational rolling stock

== Bibliography ==
- Marco Bruzzo and Michele Cerutti, Il futuro che viene dal passato, in Tutto treno, 28 (2014), n. 289, pp. 20–23, ISSN 1124-4232.
