= Candiolo =

- Comune
- Comune di Candiolo
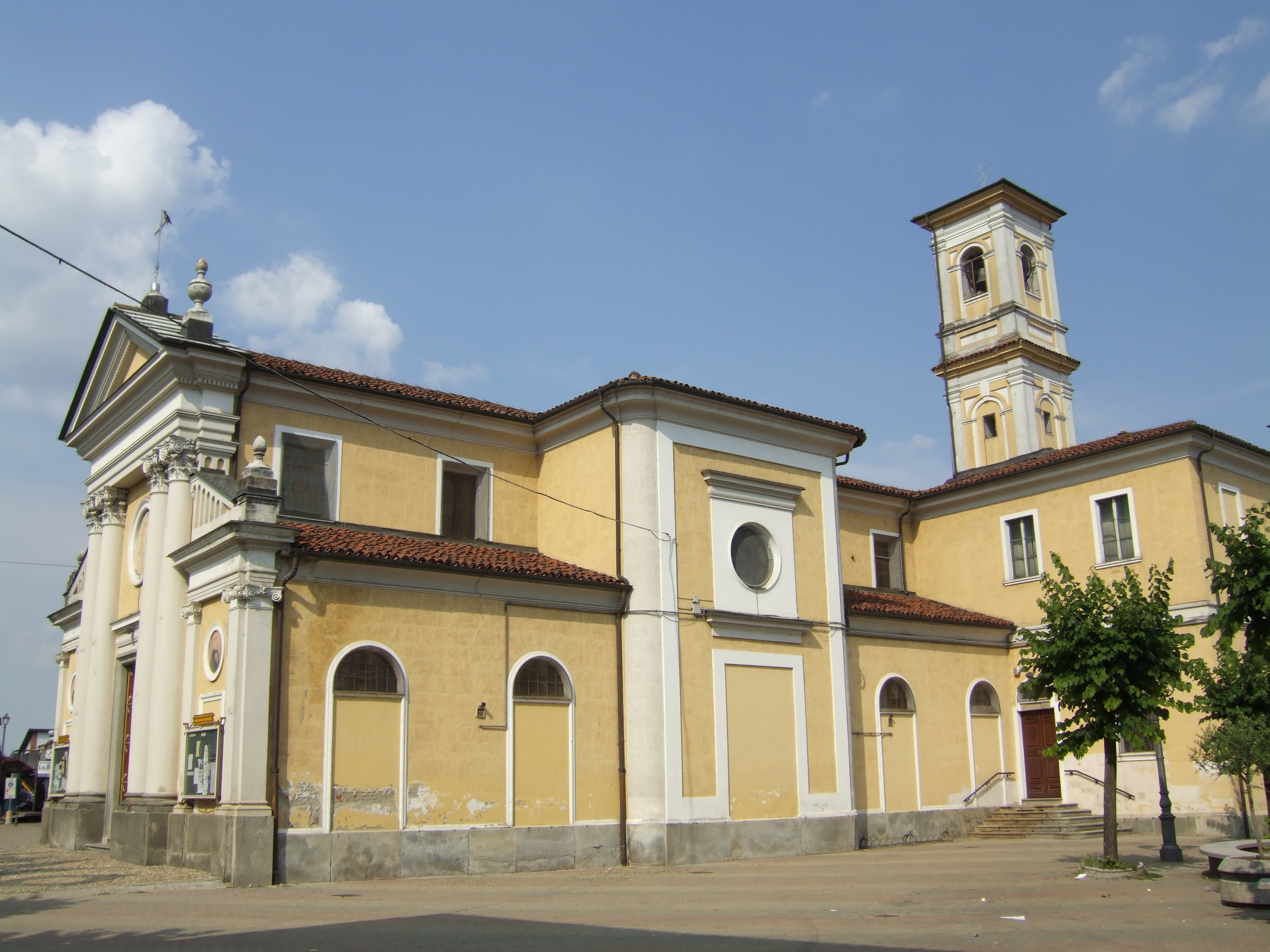
- Parish Church of St. John the Baptist

- Coat of arms

- Location within Italy Location within Piedmont
- Coordinates: 44°58′N 7°36′E
- Country: Italy
- Region: Piedmont
- Metropolitan city: Turin (TO)

Government
  - Mayor: Stefano Boccardo

Area
  - Total: 11.85 km^{2} (4.58 sq mi)
- Elevation: 237 m (778 ft)

Population (30 November 2017)
  - Total: 5,607
  - Density: 473.2/km^{2} (1,225/sq mi)
- Demonym: Candiolese(i)
- Time zone: UTC+1 (CET)
  - Summer (DST): UTC+2 (CEST)
- Postal code: 10060
- Dialing code: 011
- Patron saint: St. John
- Saint day: June 24
- Website: Official website

Candiolo is a comune (municipality) in the Metropolitan City of Turin in the Italian region Piedmont, located about 14 kilometres (9 mi) southwest of Turin. It is seat of the Istituto per la Ricerca e Cura del Cancro (IRCC, "Institute for Research and Cure of Cancer").

== Twin towns – sister cities ==
Candiolo is twinned with:

- Santa Cruz, Cape Verde, since 2005
- Pouilly-sous-Charlieu, France, since 2007
