= Pinerolo–Torre Pellice Railway =

Railway line in Piedmont, Italy

Pinerolo–Torre Pellice railway

Overview
- Native name: Ferrovia Pinerolo-Torre Pellice
- Owner: Rete Ferroviaria Italiana
- Termini: Pinerolo; Torre Pellice

Service
- Operator(s): SFAI (1882–1885); Società per le Strade Ferrate del Mediterraneo (1885–1905); Ferrovie dello Stato (1905–2001)

History
- Opened: 1882
- Closed: 2012

Technical
- Line length: 16.449 km (10.221 mi)
- Track gauge: 1,435 mm (4 ft 8 1/2 in)
- Electrification: 3 kV DC

The Pinerolo–Torre Pellice railway is a regional railway line that connects the Val Pellice with Pinerolo and Turin in Piedmont, Italy.

Passenger service has been suspended since 2012.

== History ==
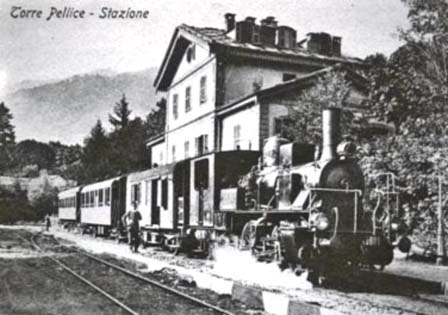
Steam train departing from Torre Pellice

A project for a railway from Pinerolo to Torre Pellice was drafted by the Hungarian engineer Langer, who obtained the relevant concession with a royal decree of 14 July 1867 with the aim of extending it beyond the state border, reaching the Marseille–Gap railway and joining it near Mont-Dauphin on the Veynes–Briançon line, but the project was never realized; the concession in French territory was requested in 1869 and obtained, but the necessary capital for construction was not found.

In 1872 the concession was taken over by a group of French financiers whose shares were, however, confiscated two years later due to their inaction. Included among the lines classified as fourth category according to the sector reorganization law of 29 July 1879, the concession for the Pinerolo–Torre Pellice line was requested by the Anonymous Company of the Turin-Pinerolo Railway as an extension of its own line, inaugurated in June 1854. This request was accepted in July 1881 and the related executive project, which also contemplated Bricherasio the junction with the Bricherasio–Barge line, was approved on 4 October of the same year.

=== Inauguration and operation ===
The official opening took place on 21 December 1882 under the management of the Società per le Ferrovie dell'Alta Italia (SFAI). Entrusted under the "Baccarini" law of 27 April 1885 to the Società per le Strade Ferrate del Mediterraneo, with services operated by the Rete Mediterranea, the line passed in 1905 to the newly established Ferrovie dello Stato.

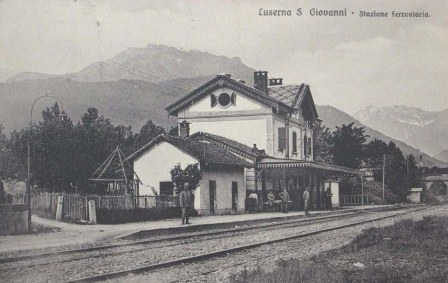
Luserna San Giovanni railway station

=== Long decline ===
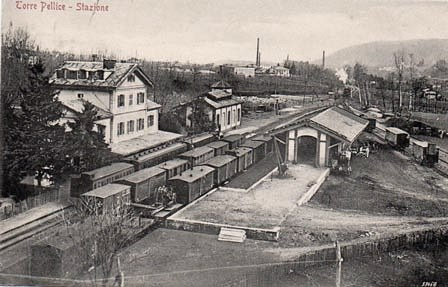
Torre Pellice crowded with trains at the beginning of the twentieth century

On the route there was also the San Secondo di Pinerolo station located in the Airali hamlet, it was deactivated in 1961. Traffic, however, continued to remain at unsatisfactory levels and, instead of strengthening the service to attract new user segments, in 1986 the line was included in the list of "dry branches" under the so-called "Signorile decree", but was saved from suppression thanks to the action of the Piedmont Region, which undertook an extensive modernization plan for its local railway network aimed at reducing operating costs through automation and remote control of the plants. Closed in 1991, the line saw the replacement of rails and the overhead supply line to be reopened only the following year.

In October 2000, a disastrous flood damaged several Piedmontese railway lines, imposing the suspension of service also on the Val Pellice line, which was interrupted in several points and with its trackbed severely damaged. After years of work, the railway was reopened on 19 December 2005 under the new operator Rete Ferroviaria Italiana, which had in the meantime been established. The service, however, remained separate from that of the Turin–Pinerolo line.

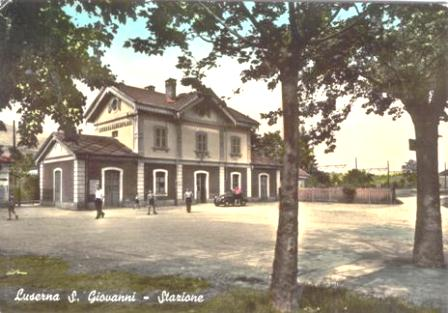
Colored postcard of Luserna San Giovanni station

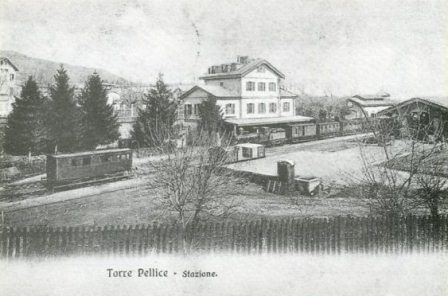
The Torre Pellice terminus

The following period seemed favorable to the future of the railway: in 2006, the new Pinerolo Olimpica station was activated on the Turin–Pinerolo line and traffic in Val Pellice began to grow again, so much so that a partial doubling of the Turin–Pinerolo line and the transformation of the Pinerolo–Torre Pellice line were hypothesized, even foreseeing a financial allocation for the purchase of specific tram-train trains, but these projects were not realized.

In 2012, also following some inspections with the RFI Caronte diagnostic train, and considering the heavy economic-financial situation of the Piedmont Region, which unlike the neighboring Lombardy did not intend to initiate a program to enhance rail transport, the same region decreed the suspension of service contracts on numerous secondary lines under its jurisdiction, leading to the definitive suspension of service on the Pinerolo–Torre Pellice line. In the following months, the barriers of the two most important level crossings in Pinerolo, in corso Torino and via Vigone, were removed.

== Characteristics ==
The line is single-track and electrified at 3 kV DC. It is 16.449 km long, with almost half of its route on curves, with an average gradient of 9.7 and a maximum of 23.48 per thousand.

The engineering works include seven bridges and overpasses with one to three spans, lengths from 10 to 17 metres, and one 7-metre metal girder bridge, in addition to one hundred and ten small bridges and culverts.

== See also ==
- History of rail transport in Italy
- List of railway stations in Lombardy
- Bricherasio–Barge railway

== Bibliography ==
- Ballatore, Luigi (2002). Storia delle ferrovie in Piemonte [History of railways in Piedmont]. Turin: Editrice Il Punto. ISBN 88-88552-00-6.
