= Pinerolo railway station =

Train station in Italy

Pinerolo
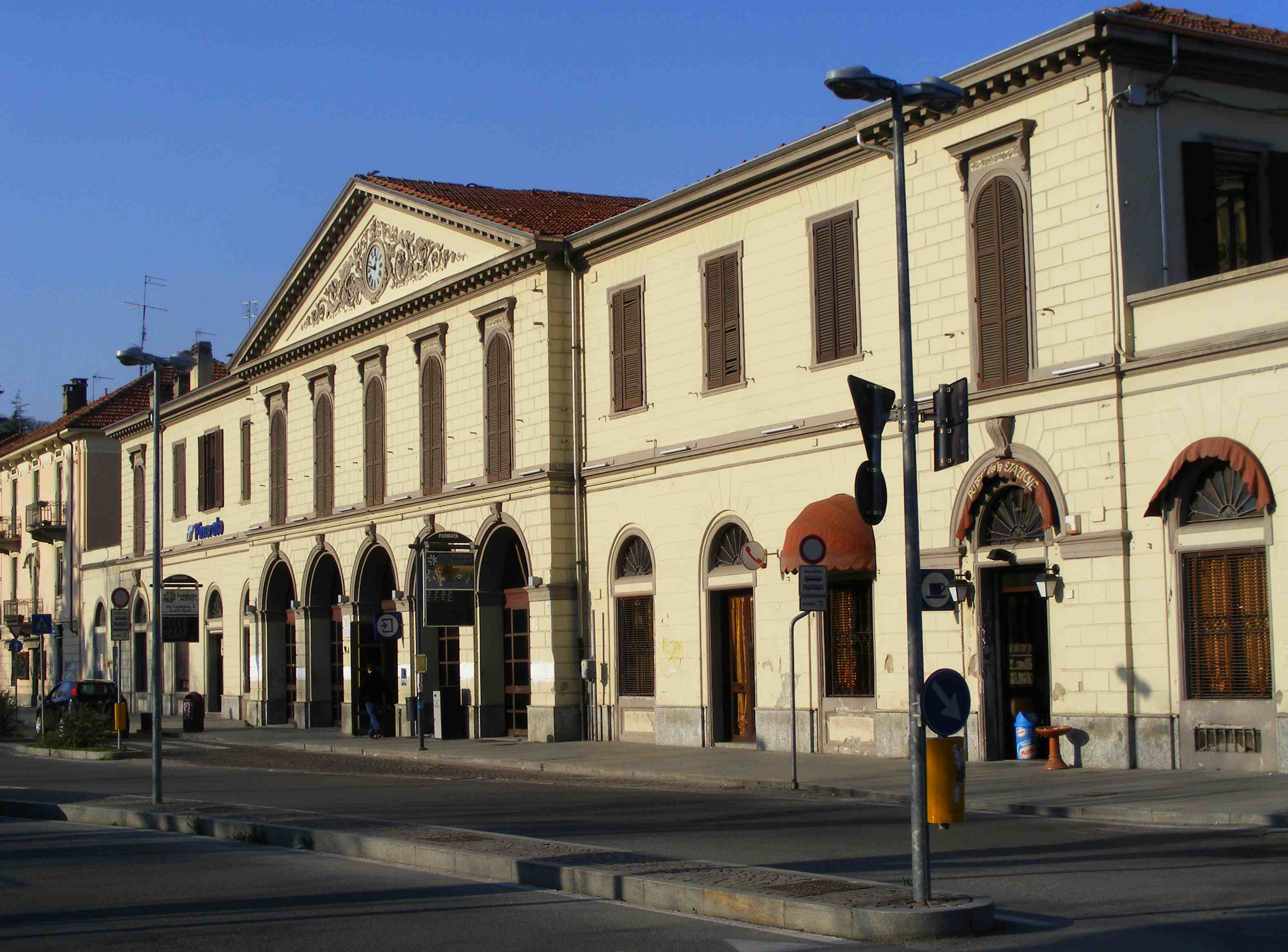

General information
- Location: Via dei Rochis, Pinerolo; Pinerolo, Metropolitan City of Turin, Piedmont; Italy
- Coordinates: 44.8875°N 7.3370°E
- Owner: Rete Ferroviaria Italiana
- Operator: Rete Ferroviaria Italiana
- Line: Turin –Pinerolo–Torre Pellice
- Platforms: 5
- Train operators: Trenitalia
- Connections: Local buses

History
- Opened: 1854
Location
- Location within Piedmont Location within Northern Italy Location within Italy

Pinerolo railway station (Italian: Stazione di Pinerolo) serves the town and comune of Pinerolo, in the Piedmont region of northwestern Italy. The station is a through station of the Turin-Pinerolo-Torre Pellice railway.

Since 2012 it has served line SFM2, part of the Turin metropolitan railway service.

== Services ==
Preceding station	Turin SFM	Following station
Pinerolo Olimpica towards Chivasso	SFM2	Terminus
