= Line SFM2 =

Railway line in Turin, Italy

Line 2

Overview
- Service type: Commuter rail
- Status: Operational
- Locale: Metropolitan City of Turin
- First service: 9 December 2012
- Current operator(s): Trenitalia

Route
- Termini: Chivasso; Pinerolo
- Stops: 15

Technical
- Rolling stock: Treno ad alta frequentazione (TAF)
- Track gauge: 1,435 mm (4 ft 8 1/2 in)
- Track owner(s): Turin Metropolitan Railway Service

Line SFM2 is part of the Turin Metropolitan Railway Service. It links Chivasso to Pinerolo, and passes through the city centre.

Service began on 9 December 2012.
