= Chivasso railway station =

Railway station serving Chivasso in northwestern Italy

Chivasso
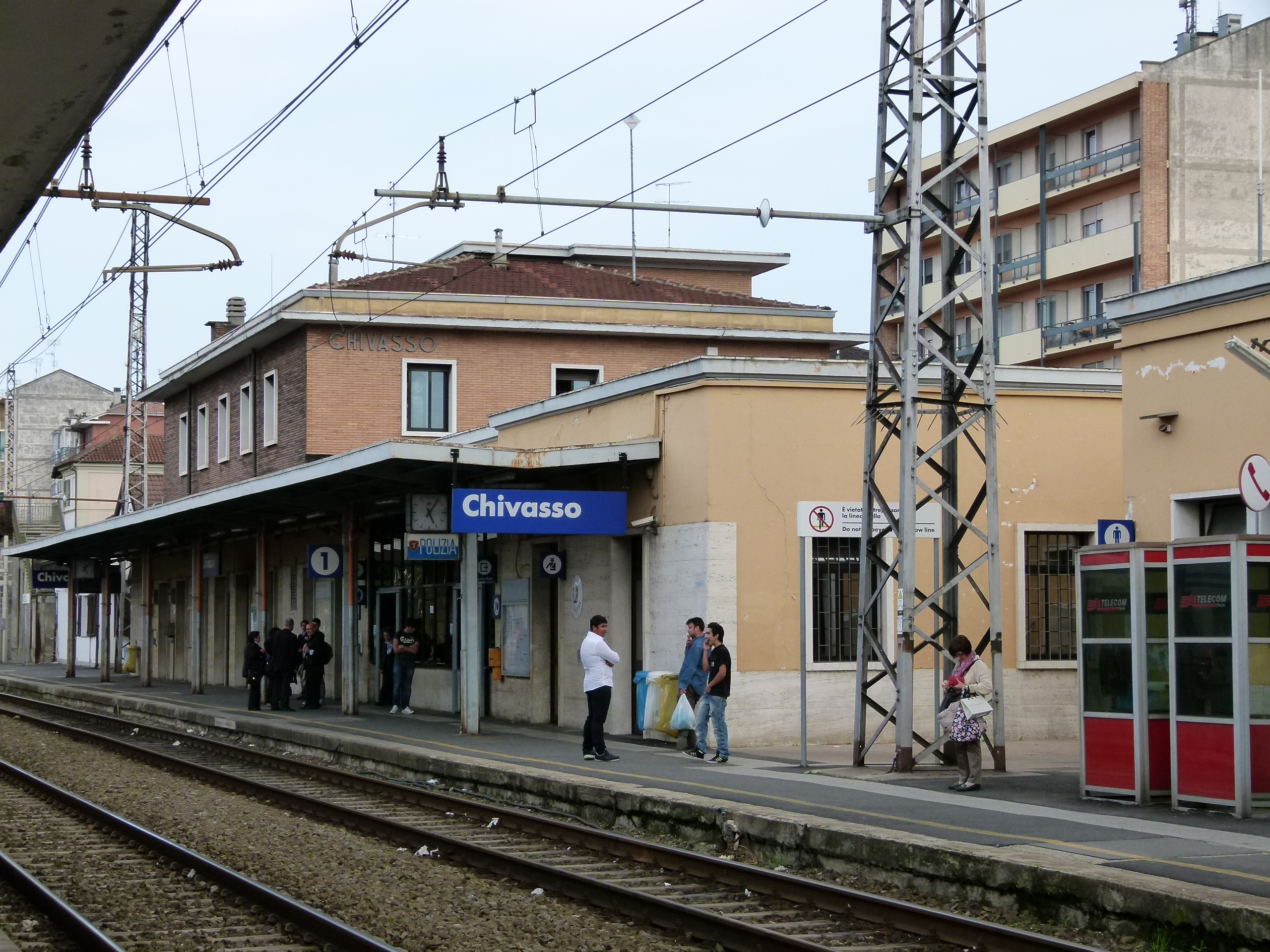

General information
- Location: Piazza Giuseppe Garibaldi; 10034 Chivasso TO; Chivasso, Metropolitan City of Turin, Piedmont; Italy
- Coordinates: 45°11′36″N 07°53′24″E
- Operator: Rete Ferroviaria Italiana
- Lines: Turin–Milan; Chivasso–Aosta; Chivasso–Asti; Chivasso–Alessandria
- Distance: 27.251 km (16.933 mi) from Torino Porta Nuova
- Train operators: Trenitalia
- Connections: Local buses

Other information
- Classification: Gold

History
- Opened: 20 October 1856; 169 years ago
Location
- Location within Piedmont Location within Northern Italy Location within Italy

Chivasso railway station serves the town and comune of Chivasso, in the Piedmont region of northwestern Italy. Opened in 1856, it forms part of the Turin–Milan railway, and is also a junction for three other lines, to Aosta, Asti and Alessandria.

The station is currently managed by Rete Ferroviaria Italiana (RFI). Train services are operated by Trenitalia. Each of these companies is a subsidiary of Ferrovie dello Stato Italiane (FS), Italy's state-owned rail company.

== Location ==
Chivasso railway station is situated at Piazza Giuseppe Garibaldi, at the northern edge of the town centre.

== History ==
The station was opened on 20 October 1856, together with the rest of the Turin–Novara section of the Turin–Milan railway. Two years later, upon the inauguration of the Chivasso–Aosta railway, the station became a junction station.

In 1887, the line to Casale Monferrato came into operation, and in 1912, the line to Asti was activated.

The station was heavily damaged by Allied bombing during World War II.

== Features ==
The station yard now features six tracks plus a bay platform that serves as the terminus of the line to Asti.

The goods yard, on the south side of the line and west of the station, was taken out of service in the second half of the 1990s and upgraded with the construction of a new bus terminal and the new public library.

== Train services ==
The station is served by the following services:

- Express services (Regionale Veloce) Turin - Chivasso – Santhià – Vercelli – Novara – Milan
- Express services (Regionale Veloce) Turin - Chivasso – Ivrea – Aosta
- Regional services (Treno regionale) Ivrea - Chivasso
- Regional services (Treno regionale) Chivasso - Santhià - Vercelli - Novara
- Regional services (Treno regionale) Chivasso - Casale Monferrato - Alessandria
- Regional services (Treno regionale) Turin - Chivasso - Santhià - Biella
- Turin Metropolitan services (SFM2) Pinerolo - Turin - Chivasso

=== Trams and buses ===
The station has a bus terminal.

== See also ==
- History of rail transport in Italy
- List of railway stations in Piedmont
- Rail transport in Italy
- Railway stations in Italy
