= Ruché =

Variety of grape

- Grape (Vitis)
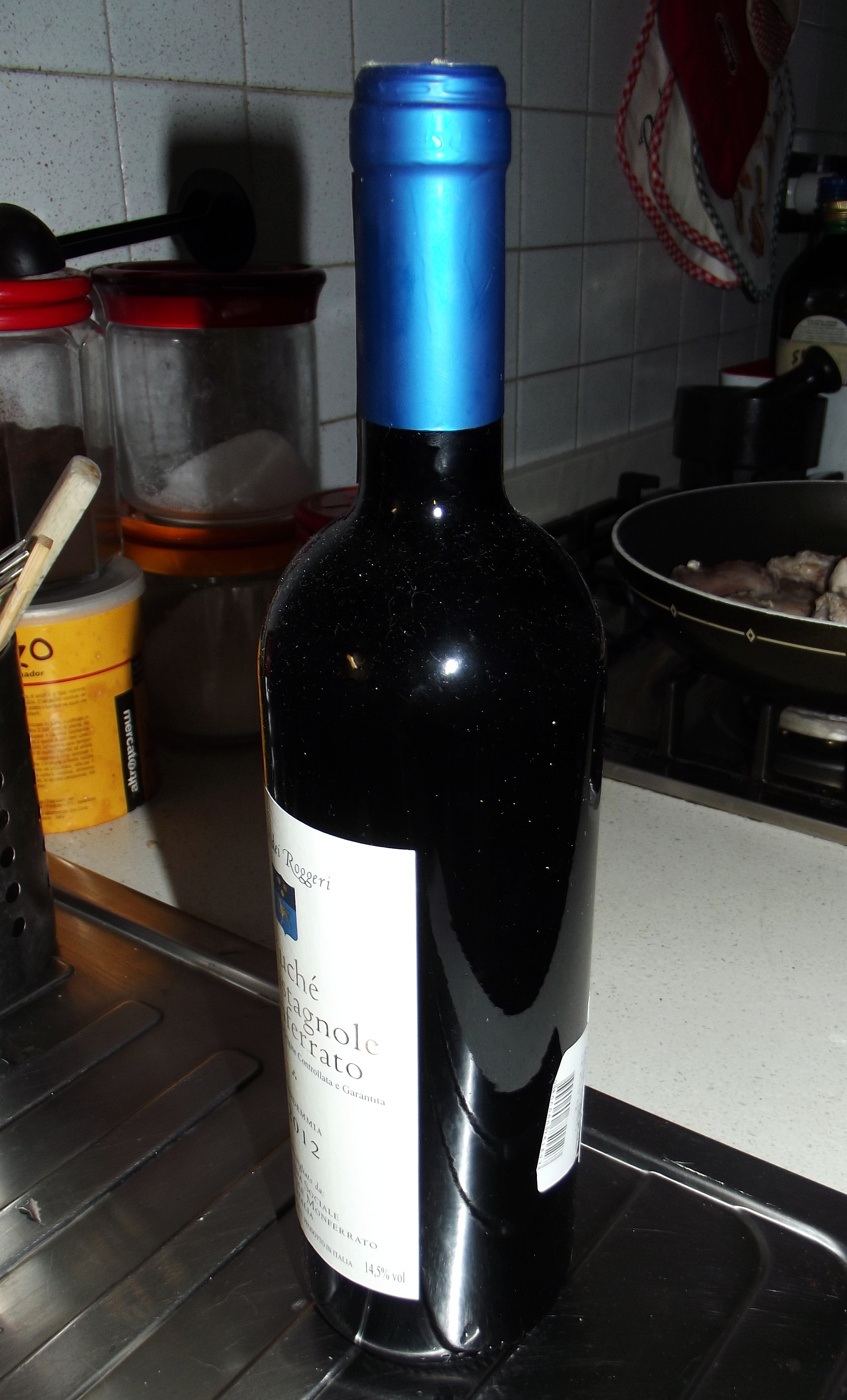
- Ruché di Castagnole Monferrato DOCG year 2012
- Color of berry skin: Red
- Origin: Asti
- Notable regions: Piedmont
- Notable wines: Ruché di Castagnole Monferrato
- VIVC number: 10318

Ruché (English: /ˈruːkeɪ/ ROO-kay, Italian: [ruˈke]; Piedmontese: roché [rʊˈke]) is a red Italian wine grape variety from the Piedmont region. It is largely used in making Ruché di Castagnole Monferrato, a small production red varietal wine which was granted Denominazione di Origine Controllata (DOC) status by presidential decree on October 22, 1987, and was granted the more prestigious Denominazione di Origine Controllata e Garantita (DOCG) status in 2010. The current DOC recognized area of production for the wine covers only about 100 acres (40 hectares) of vines around the villages of Castagnole Monferrato, Refrancore, Grana, Montemagno, Viarigi, Scurzolengo and Portacomaro. Ruché di Castagnole Monferrato is, therefore, one of the lowest production varietal wines in Italy. The grape is also grown to some extent in the neighboring province of Alessandria.

There is some debate about the origins of the Ruché grape. One theory is that the variety is indigenous to the hills northeast of the town of Asti. Another theory is that the grape is a local variation on a French import. It has been grown in the area for at least one hundred years but has only recently been marketed and consumed outside of the immediate vicinity of its production. Ruché di Castagnole Monferrato tends to be medium bodied with notes of pepper and wild berries and floral aromas on the nose. The wine is often characterized by moderate acidity and soft tannins. In the Piedmont region it is often paired with slow-cooked beef, northern Italian cheeses and mushrooms.

== History ==
The exact origins of Ruché are unknown with ampelographers holding different theories. The two most prominent theories is either grape is indigenous to the Piedmont region or that it originated in Burgundy and was brought to Piedmont sometime in the 18th century. For most of its history in Piedmont, the grape has been cultivated in relative obscurity. In the early 21st century, the grape experience a slight revival of interest with the DOC wine of Ruché di Castagnole Monferrato.

== Wines ==
Ruché shares some similarities with the major Piedmontese grape Nebbiolo in that it tends to produce very tannic, light colored wines with pronounced aromas and bouquet. The wines are often characterized by a slightly bitter aftertaste.

== Synonyms ==
Ruché is known under a variety of spellings, including Rouche, Rouchet, Rouché or Ruchè.
