= Calliano, Piedmont =

Calliano
- Comune
- Comune di Calliano
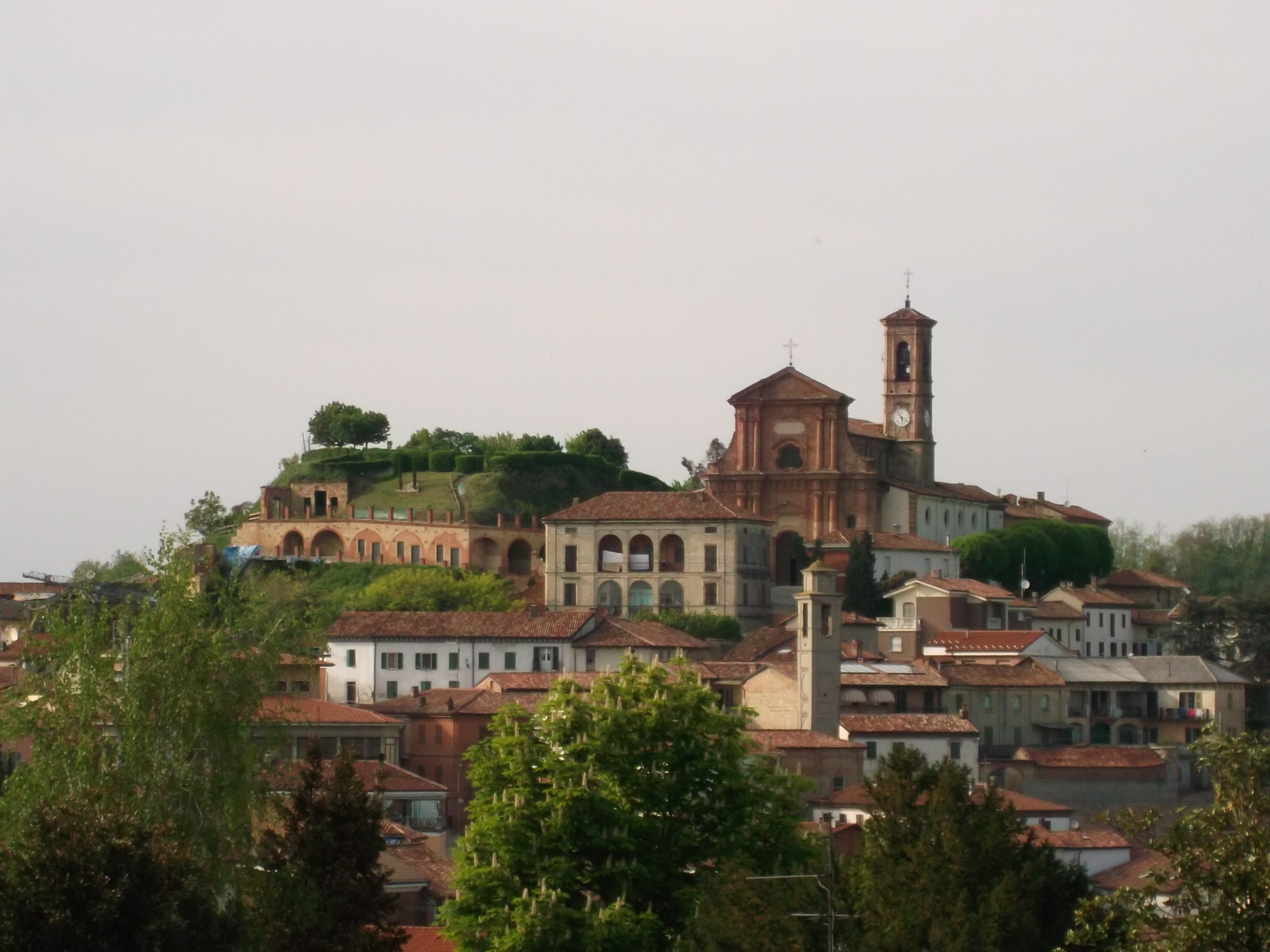
- View of Calliano

- Coat of arms

- Location within Italy Location within Piedmont
- Coordinates: 45°00′34″N 8°15′31″E
- Country: Italy
- Region: Piedmont
- Province: Asti (AT)

Government
  - Mayor: Paolo Maria Belluardo

Area
  - Total: 17.44 km^{2} (6.73 sq mi)
- Elevation: 258 m (846 ft)

Population (28 February 2015)
  - Total: 1,325
  - Density: 75.97/km^{2} (196.8/sq mi)
- Time zone: UTC+1 (CET)
  - Summer (DST): UTC+2 (CEST)
- Postal code: 14031
- Dialing code: 0141
- Saint day: October 21
- Website: www.comune.calliano.at.it

Calliano is a comune (municipality) in the Province of Asti in the Italian region Piedmont, located about 45 kilometres (28 mi) east of Turin and about 14 kilometres (9 mi) northeast of Asti. Calliano borders the following municipalities: Alfiano Natta, Asti, Castagnole Monferrato, Castell'Alfero, Grana, Penango, Portacomaro, Scurzolengo, and Tonco.

== Twin towns ==
Calliano is twinned with:

- Calliano, Trentino, Italy
- Callian, France
