= Rovasenda railway station =

Railway station in Italy

Rovasenda
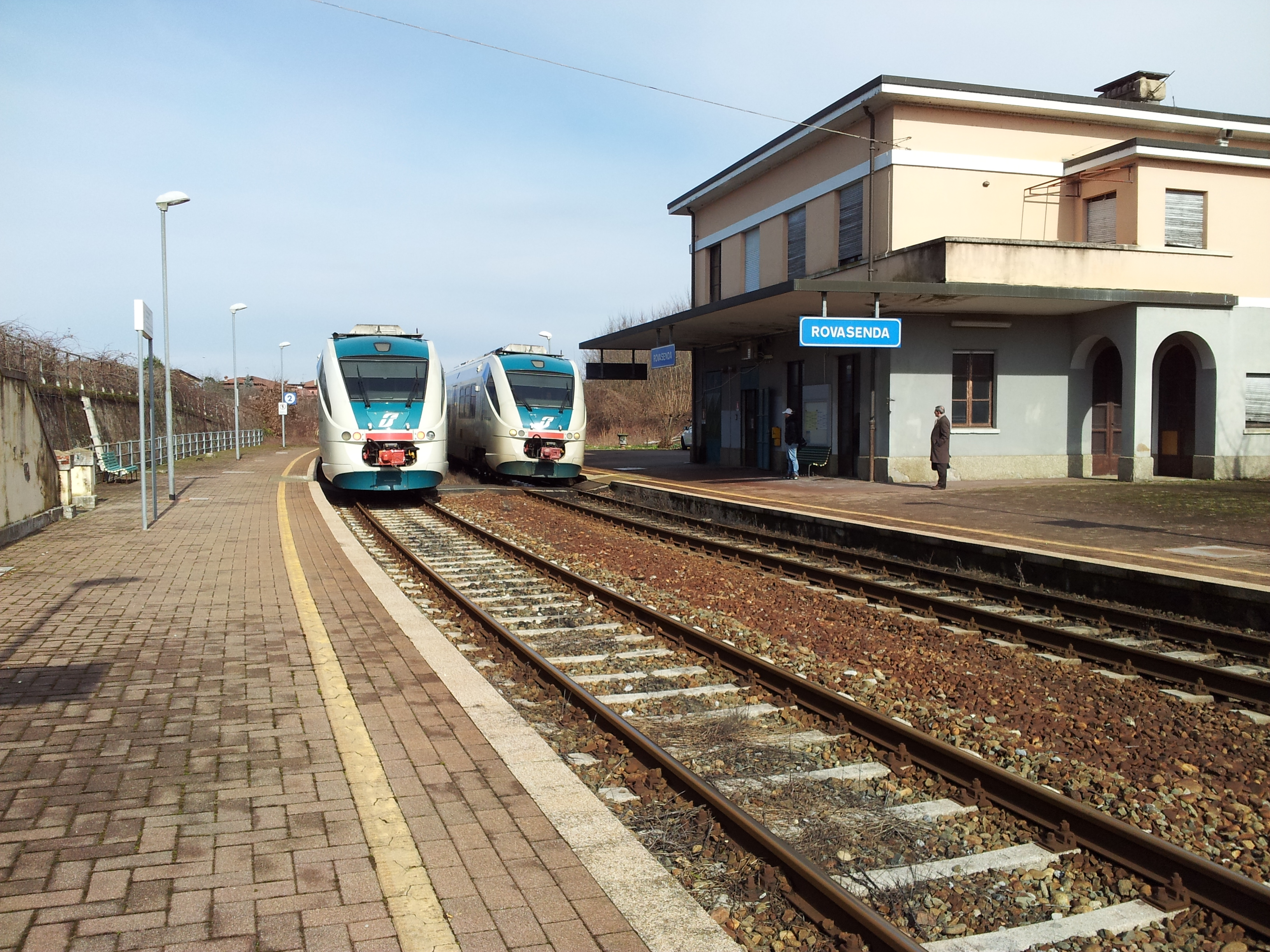
- Side station railway.

General information
- Location: Via Roma, 10; 13040 Rovasenda VC; Rovasenda, Vercelli, Piedmont; Italy
- Coordinates: 45°32′13″N 08°19′03″E
- Operator: Rete Ferroviaria Italiana
- Line: Biella–Novara
- Distance: 27.537 km (17.111 mi) from Novara
- Platforms: 2
- Train operators: Trenitalia
- Connections: Rovasenda Alta railway station

Other information
- Classification: Bronze

History
- Opened: 18 May 1939; 87 years ago
Location
- Location within Piedmont Location within Northern Italy Location within Italy

Rovasenda railway station (Italian: Stazione di Rovasenda) is one of two train stations serving the comune of Rovasenda (situated in the valley part of hill), in the Piedmont region of northwestern Italy. It is the junction of the Biella–Novara. It also plays the role of interchange with station Rovasenda Alta of line Santhià–Arona.

The station is currently managed by Rete Ferroviaria Italiana (RFI), while train services are operated by Trenitalia. Both companies are subsidiaries of Ferrovie dello Stato (FS), Italy's state-owned rail company.

== History ==
The station was opened along with the rest of the line from 18 May 1939. However, it became operational only on 20 July 1940 because of the need to complete several systems and the absence of the rolling stock.

Because of the altitude, it was not possible to rejoin the new line with the existing station. It was therefore built a new station more valley and an intermediate square for put into communication the two lines.

From 21 January 1961, in advance to the end of the concession to the "Società Ferrovia Biella-Novara (SFBN)" company, the management of the railway line passed to the state and the exercise of the stations was assumed by Ferrovie dello Stato.

In the year 2000, the plant management passed to Rete Ferroviaria Italiana, which is classified in the category "Bronze".

== Features ==
Two tracks of which are equipped with platforms.

== Train services ==
The station is served by the following service(s):

- Regional services (Treno regionale) Biella San Paolo - Novara

== See also ==
- History of rail transport in Italy
- List of railway stations in Piedmont
- Rail transport in Italy
- Railway stations in Italy
