= Portacomaro =

Portacomaro Portacomé
- Comune
- Comune di Portacomaro
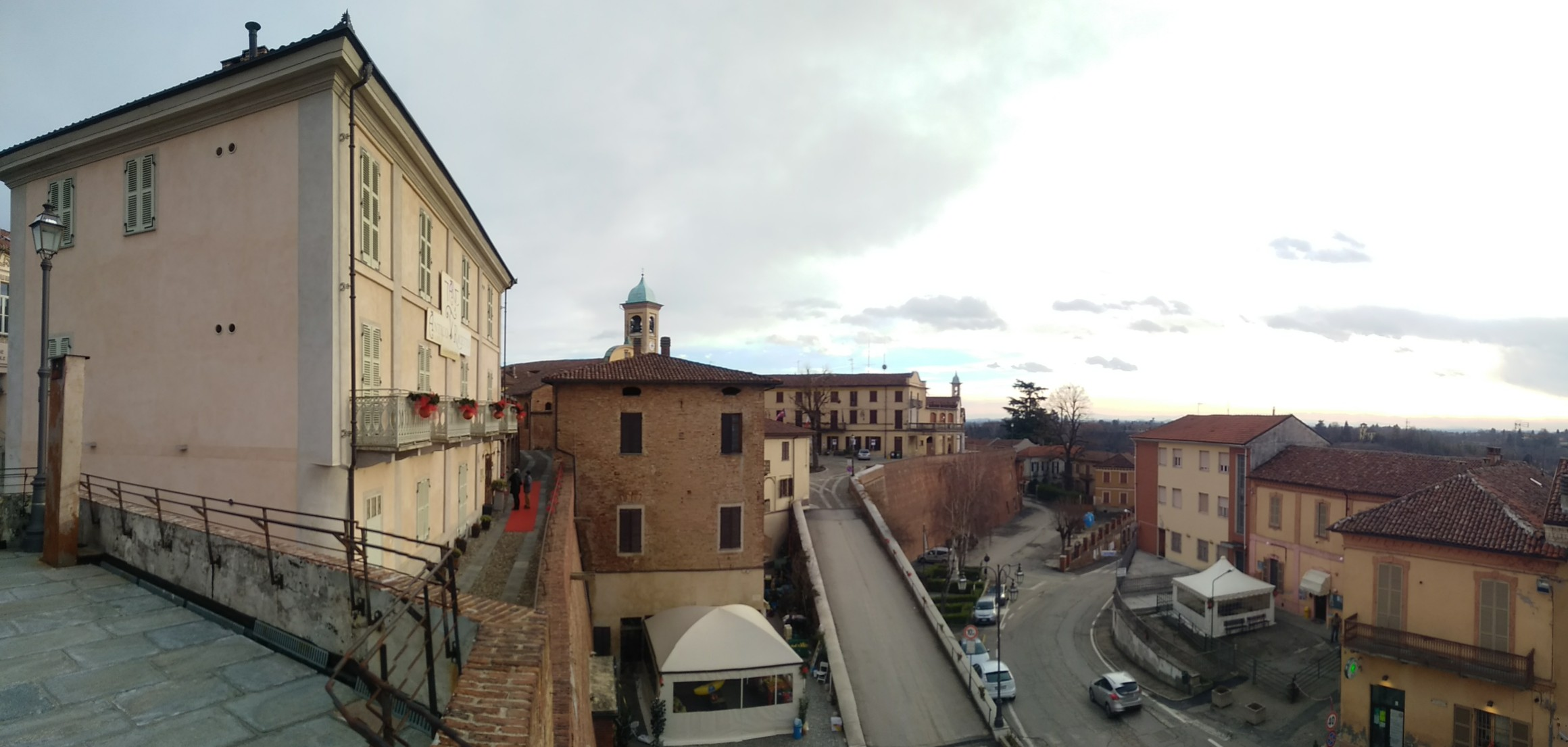

- Coat of arms

- Location within Italy Location within Piedmont
- Coordinates: 44.9574°N 8.2582°E
- Country: Italy
- Region: Piedmont
- Province: Asti (AT)
- Frazioni: Migliandolo

Government
  - Mayor: Valter Vittorio Antonio Petrini

Area
  - Total: 10.9 km^{2} (4.2 sq mi)
- Elevation: 232 m (761 ft)

Population (30 July 2016)
  - Total: 2,017
  - Density: 185/km^{2} (479/sq mi)
- Time zone: UTC+1 (CET)
  - Summer (DST): UTC+2 (CEST)
- Postal code: 14037
- Dialing code: 0141

Portacomaro (Piedmontese: Portacomé) is a comune (municipality) in the Province of Asti in the Italian region Piedmont, located about 45 kilometres (28 mi) southeast of Turin and about 7 kilometres (4 mi) northeast of Asti.

Portacomaro borders the following municipalities: Asti, Calliano, Castagnole Monferrato, and Scurzolengo.

== Main sights ==
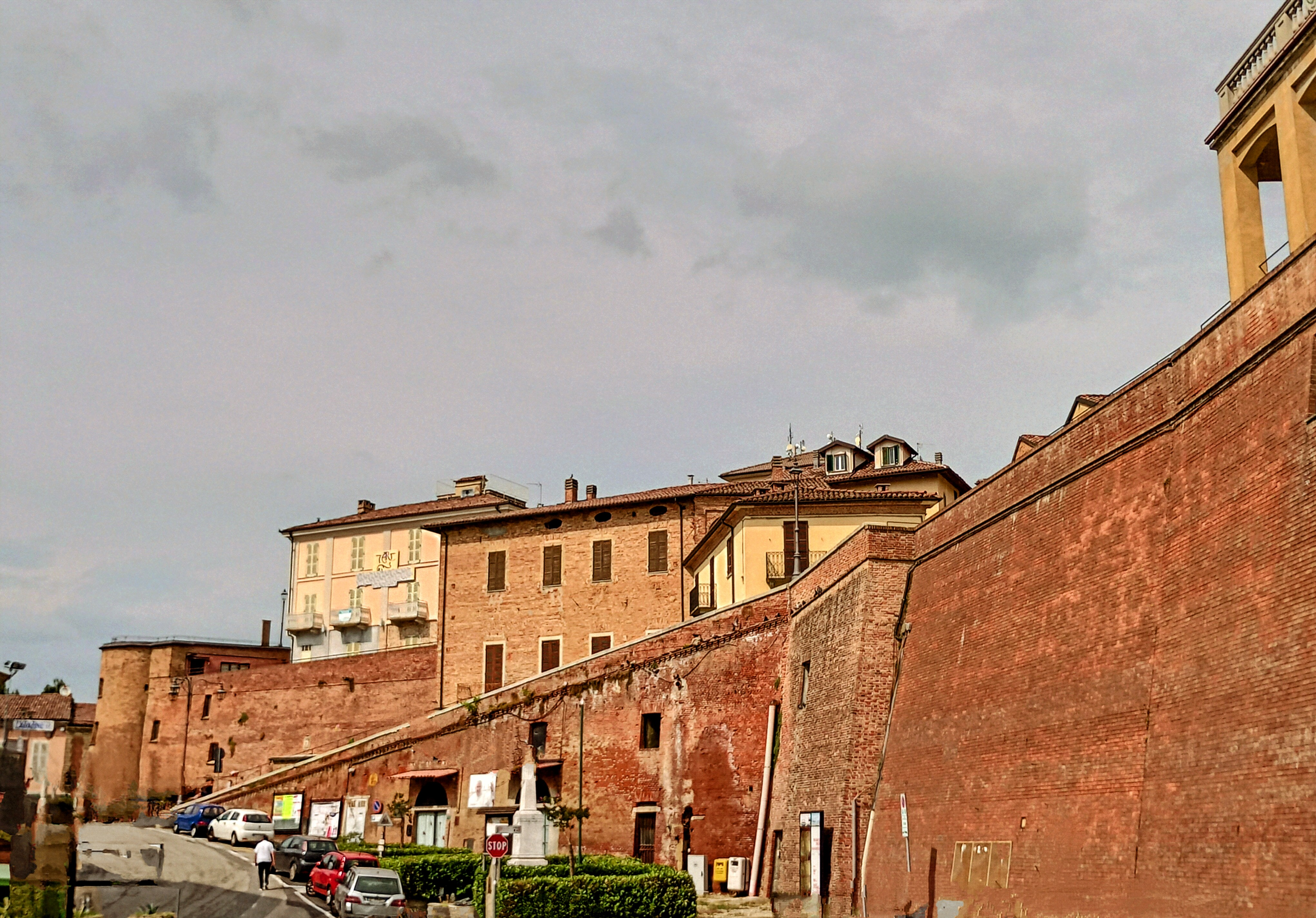
the ancient ricetto

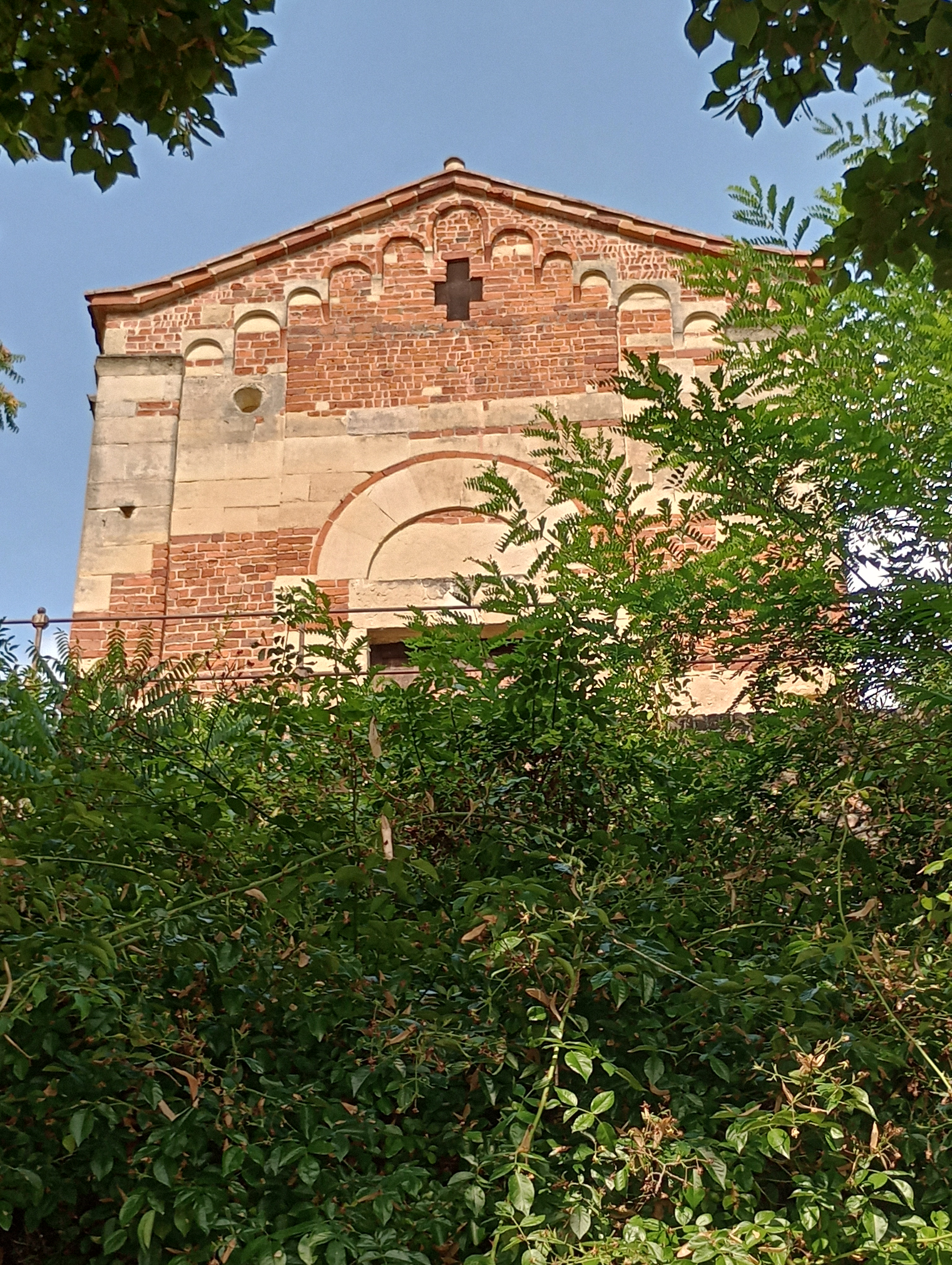
exterior of the Romanesque church of St.Peter

The main feature located in the centre of the town is the ancient ricetto which was a fortified area with a defensive tower. It was built to store goods and livestock and to protect the citizens of Portacamaro in case of a raid by enemy armies. The Municipio is located in the Ricetto.

Well-preserved apsidal frescos can be found in the romanesque church of St. Peter (first recorded in 1130 AD). Formerly occupied by a monastic community, the chancel sides are decorated with figures of St. Bernard and St. Sebastian. The central section of tripartite rear wall of the sanctuary (probably the oldest) features a deisis (Crucifixion with Virgin and the beloved disciple, St. John), figures of St. Andrew are to the right, St. Agatha (kneeling) and St Peter to the left.

== People ==
- Valerio Arri, Olympic marathoner
- Mario José Bergoglio, father of Pope Francis
