= San Pietro, Carpignano Sesia =

Church building in Carpignano Sesia, Italy

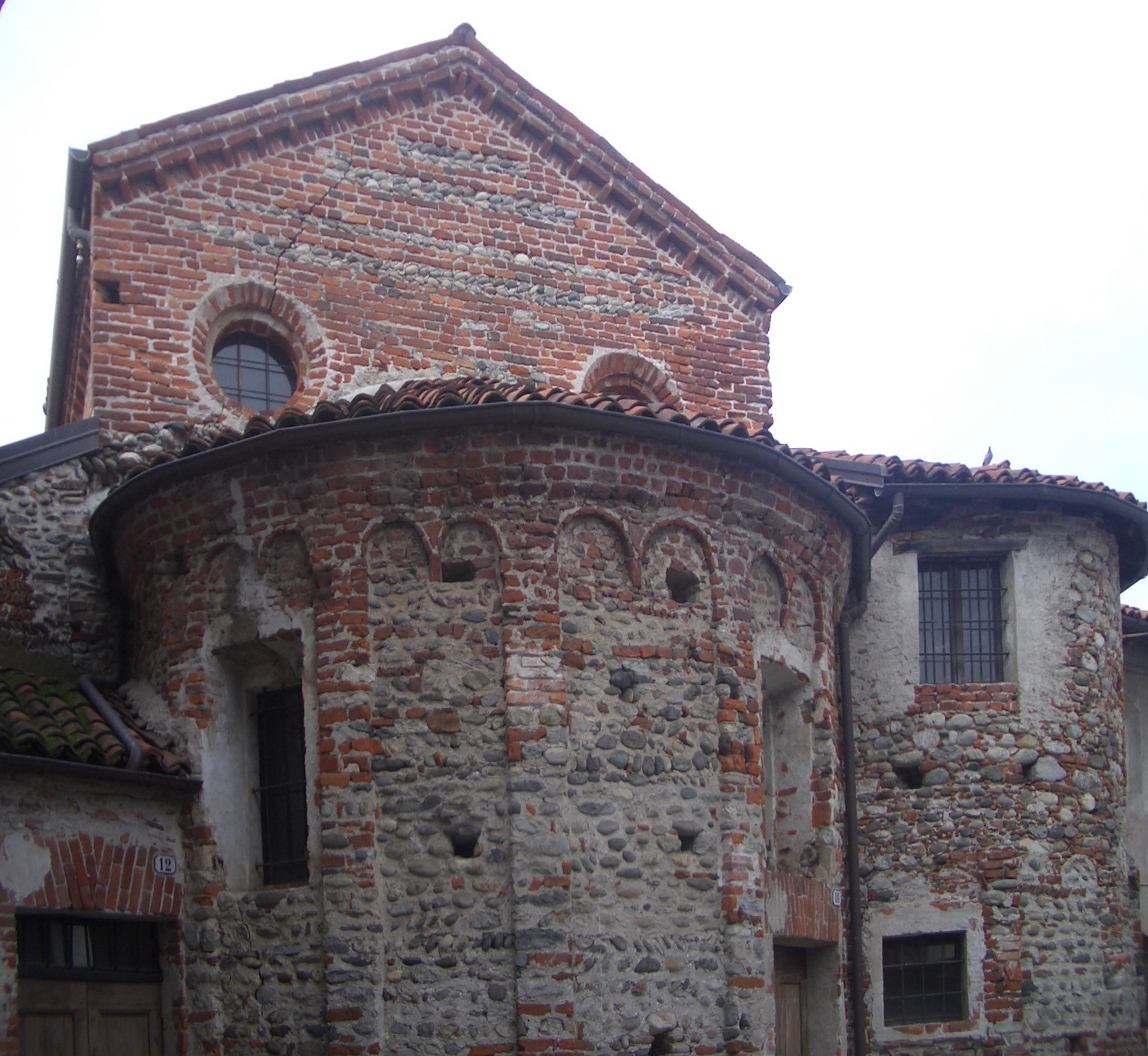

The Church of Saint Peter (Italian: Chiesa di San Pietro) is a Roman Catholic church building in Carpignano Sesia, province and diocese of Novara, Italy. Already present within the ricetto in the 11th century, this temple is an important example of Romanesque architecture and painting in the Novara area.

== Gallery ==
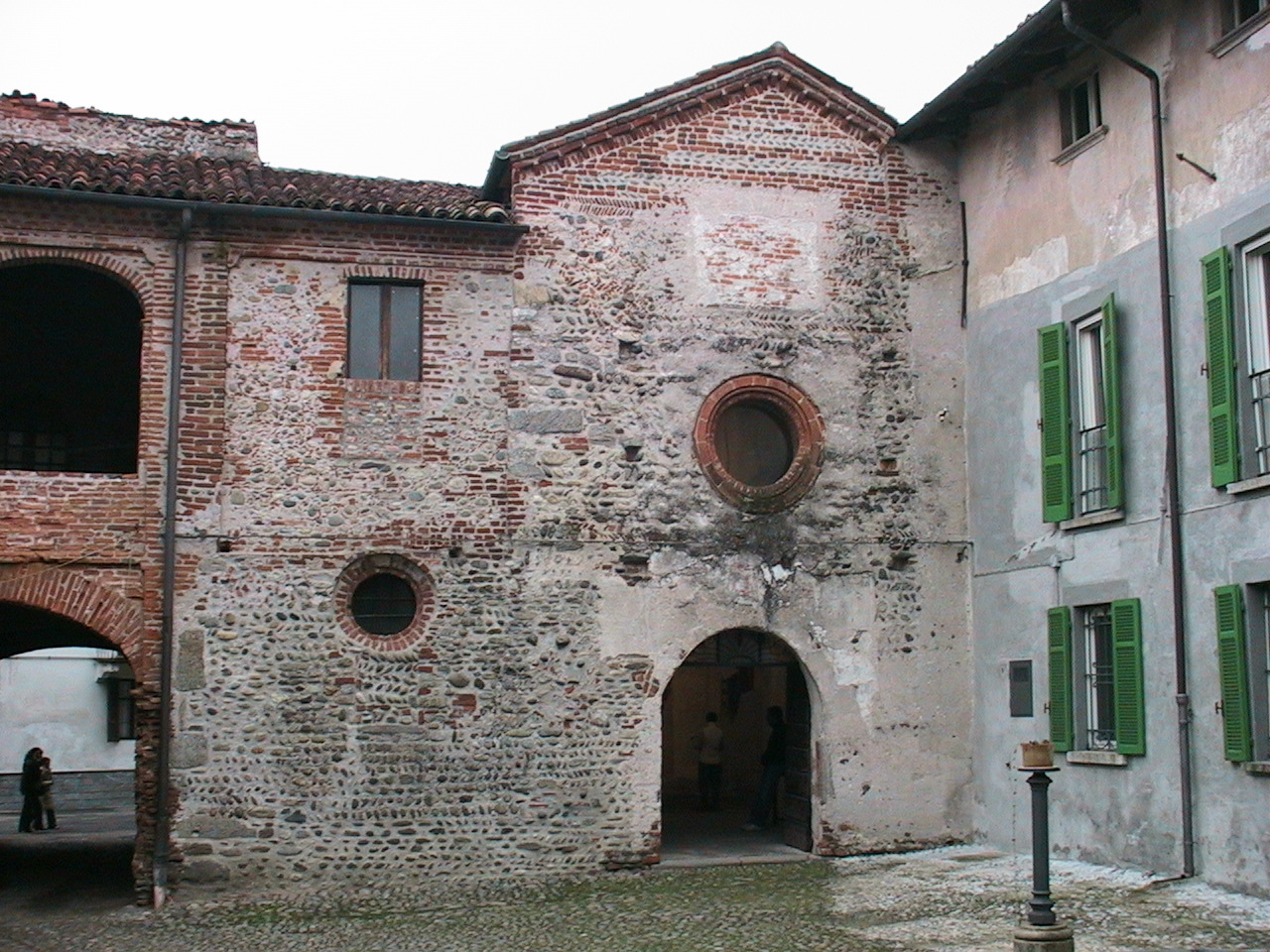
L'aspetto odierno della facciata

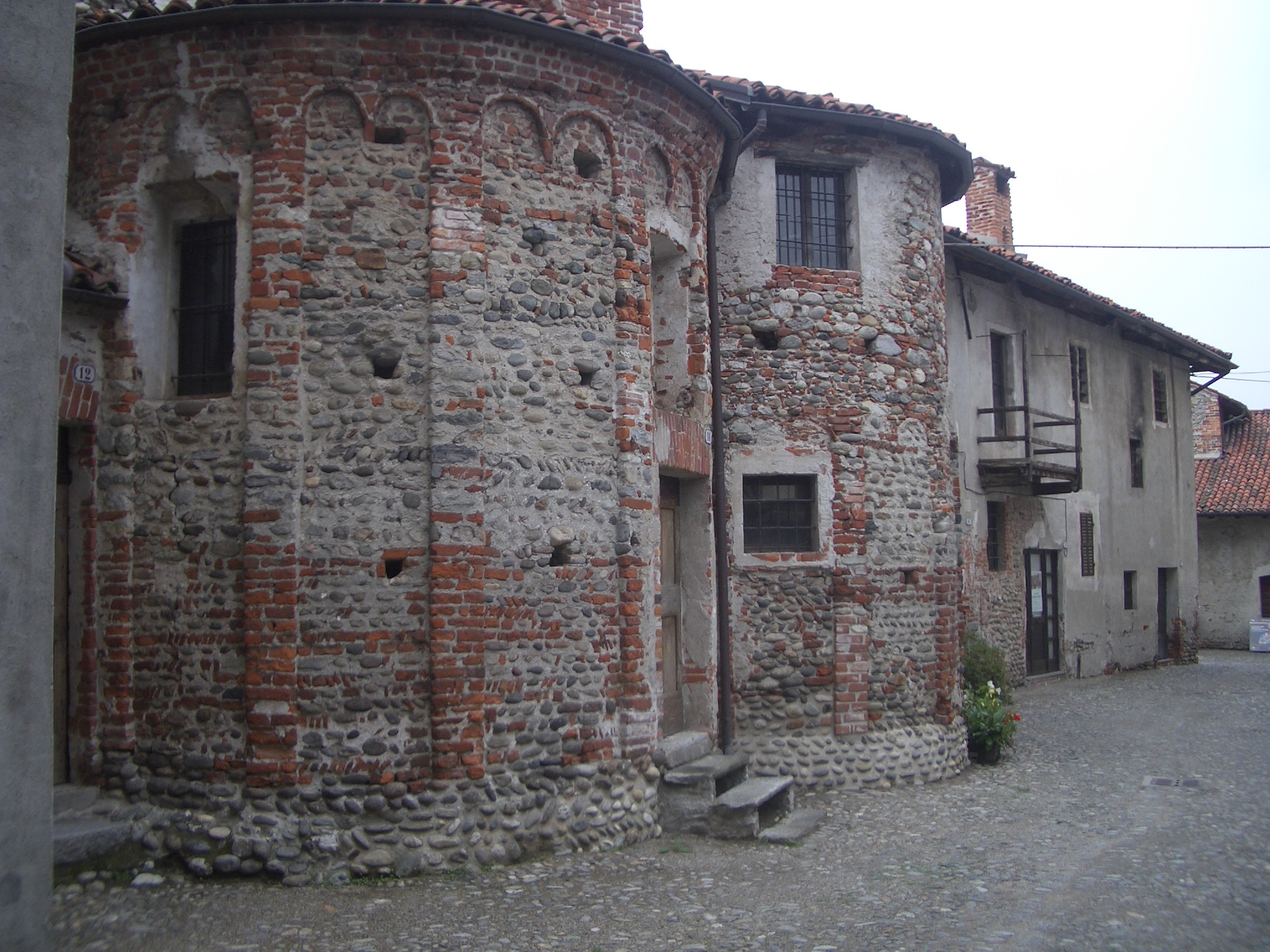
Le absidi

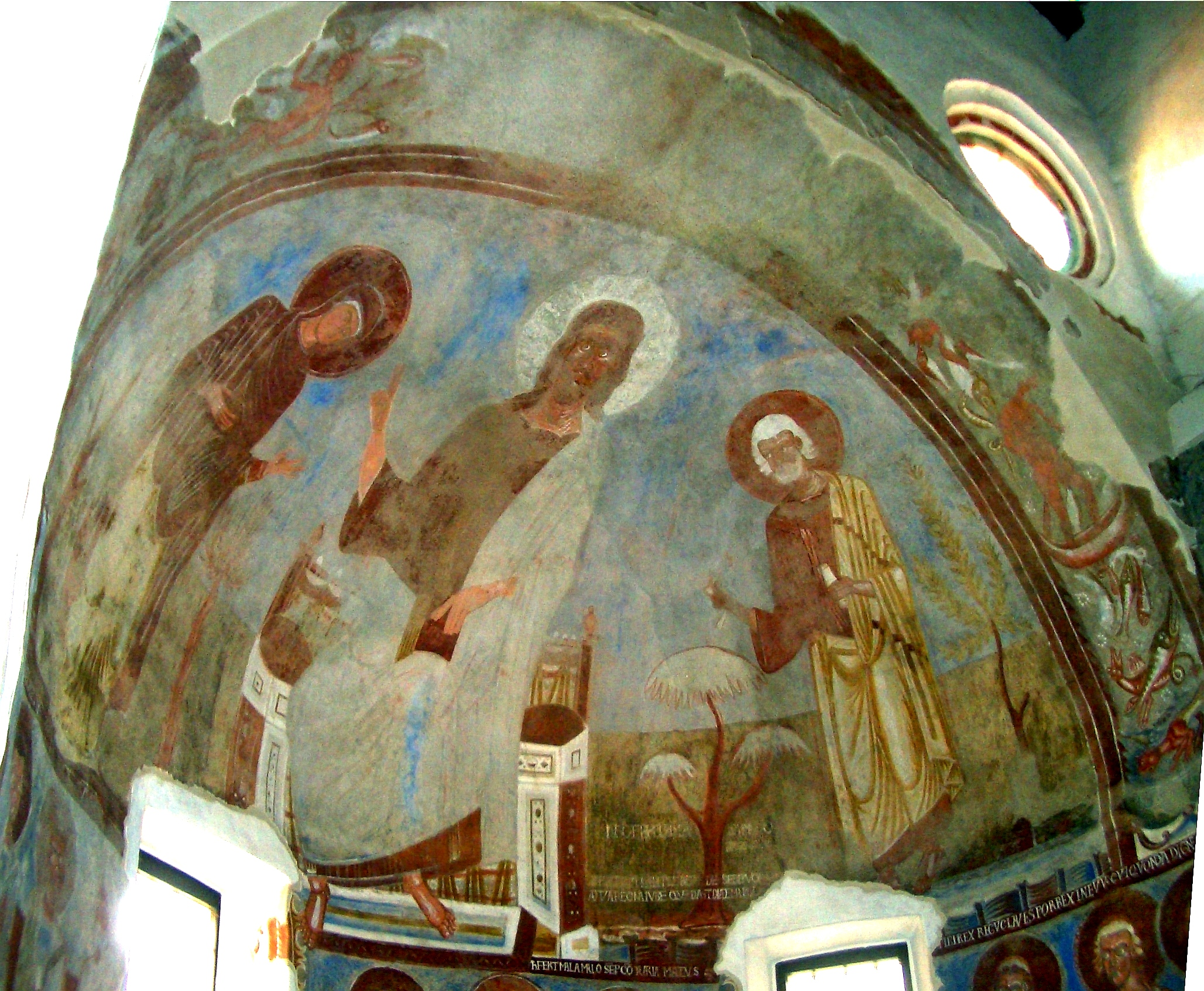
Deesis, affresco dell'abide, XII secolo

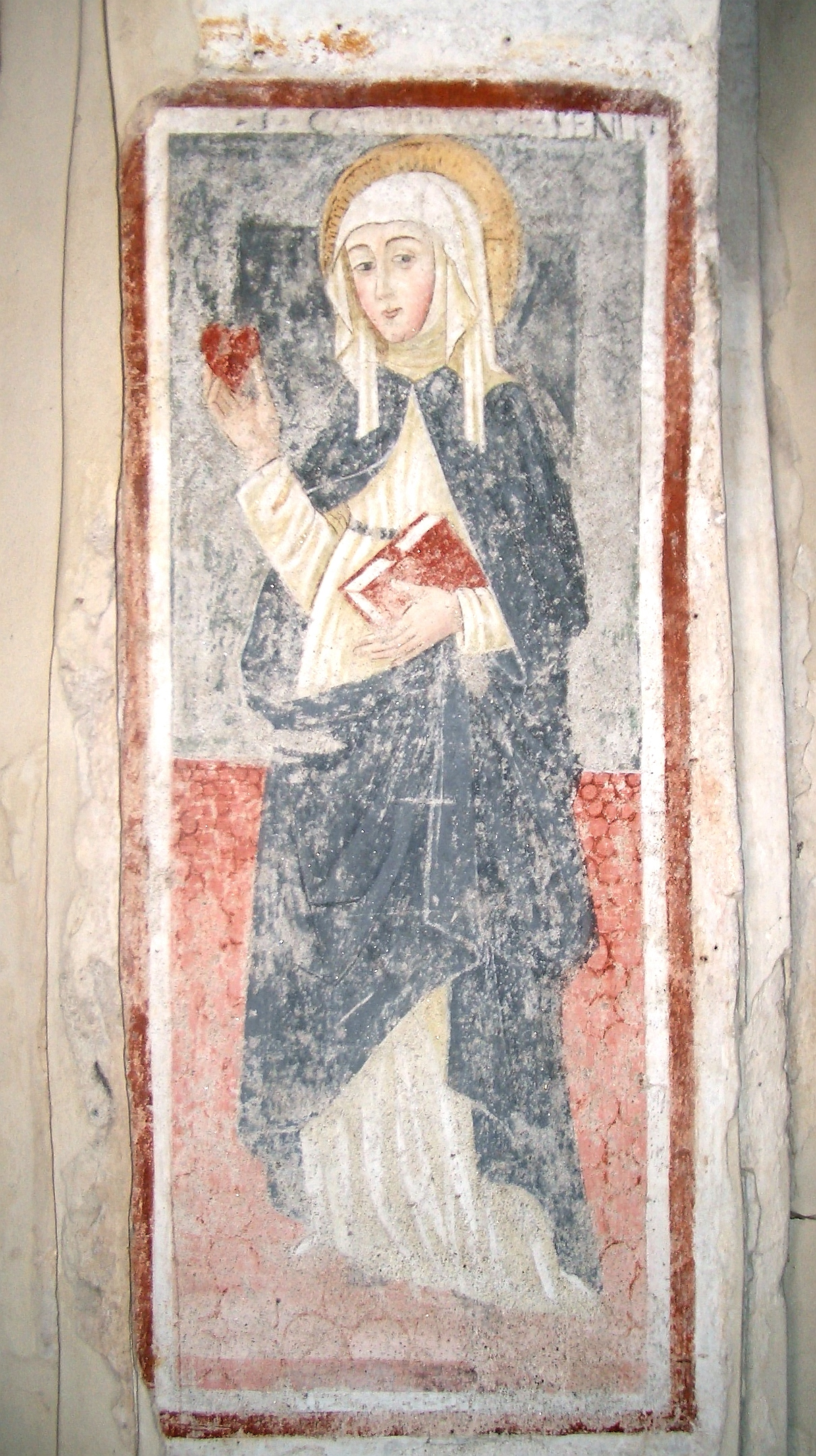
Pittore del XV secolo, Santa Caterina da Siena
