= Grana Monferrato =

- Comune
- Comune di Grana Monferrato
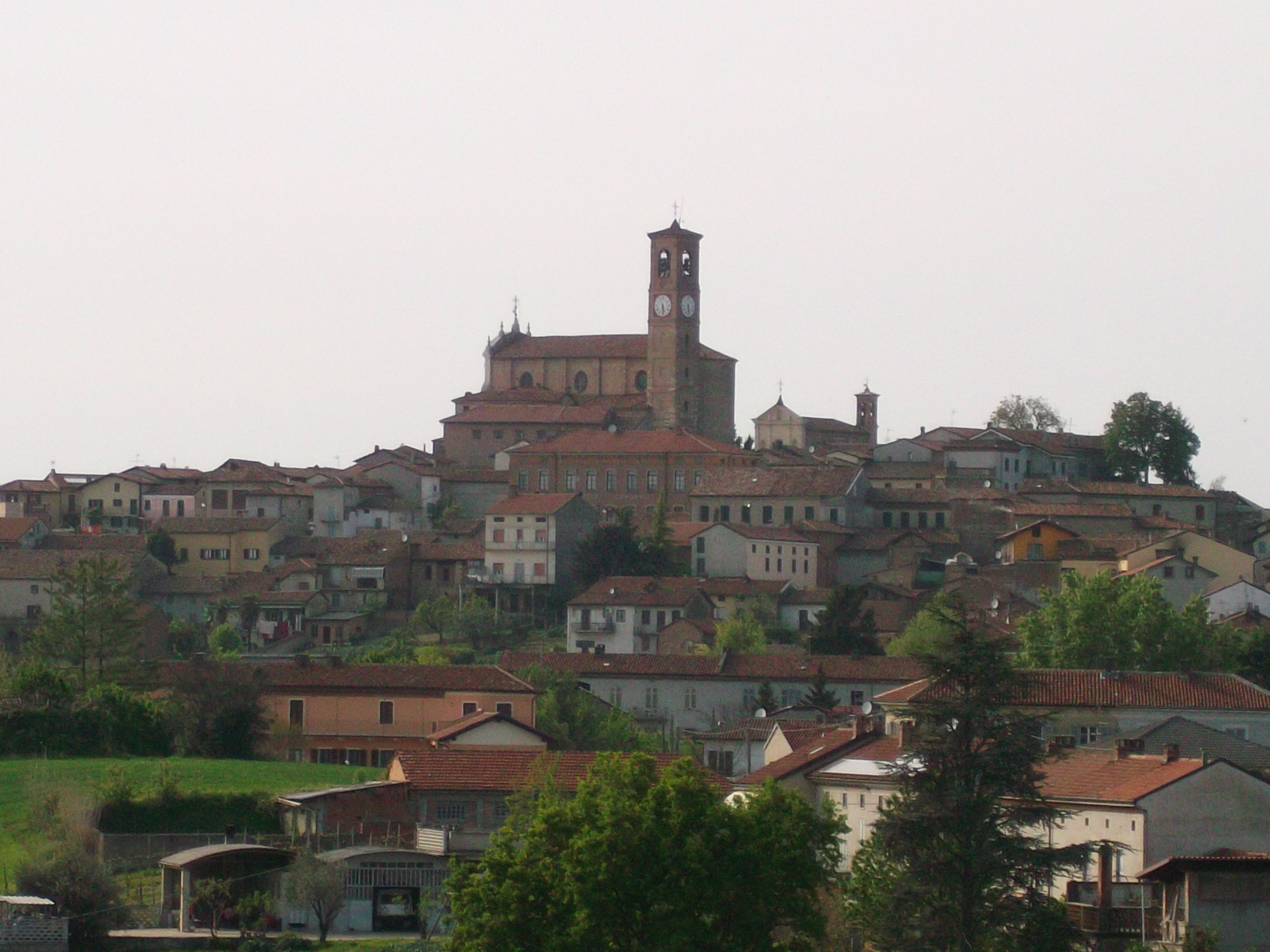
- View of Grana Monferrato

- Coat of arms

- Location within Italy Location within Piedmont
- Coordinates: 44°59′56″N 8°17′55″E
- Country: Italy
- Region: Piedmont
- Province: Asti (AT)

Area
  - Total: 6.0 km^{2} (2.3 sq mi)

Population (Dec. 2004)
  - Total: 628
  - Density: 100/km^{2} (270/sq mi)
- Demonym: Granesi
- Time zone: UTC+1 (CET)
  - Summer (DST): UTC+2 (CEST)
- Postal code: 14030
- Dialing code: 0141

Grana Monferrato is a comune (municipality) in the Province of Asti in the Italian region Piedmont, located about 50 kilometres (31 mi) east of Turin and about 12 kilometres (7 mi) northeast of Asti. As of 31 December 2004, it had a population of 628 and an area of 6.0 square kilometres (2.3 mi^{2}).

Grana Monferrato borders the following municipalities: Calliano, Casorzo, Castagnole Monferrato, Grazzano Badoglio, Moncalvo, Montemagno, and Penango. 44.998796°N 8.298583°E

Grana was renamed Grana Monferrato in 2023.

== Demographic evolution ==
Historical population

Year	Pop.	±%
1861	1,604	—
1871	1,767	+10.2%
1881	1,892	+7.1%
1901	2,069	+9.4%
1911	1,945	−6.0%

Year	Pop.	±%
1921	1,916	−1.5%
1931	1,605	−16.2%
1936	1,500	−6.5%
1951	1,206	−19.6%
1961	940	−22.1%

Year	Pop.	±%
1971	891	−5.2%
1981	776	−12.9%
1991	675	−13.0%
2001	611	−9.5%

Source: Data from ISTAT
