= Lenta, Piedmont =

Lenta
- Comune
- Comune di Lenta
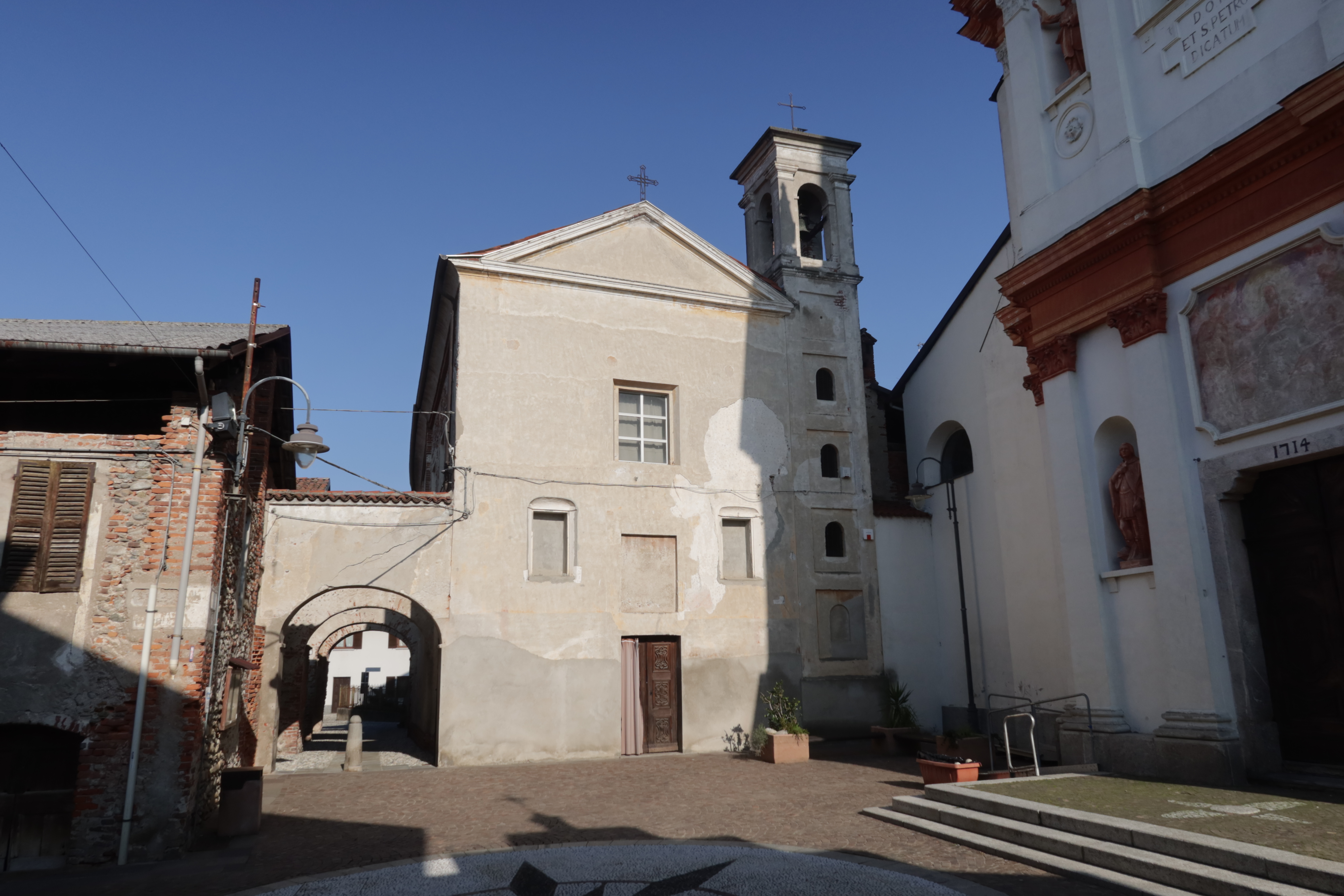

- Location within Italy Location within Piedmont
- Coordinates: 45°33′N 8°23′E
- Country: Italy
- Region: Piedmont
- Province: Vercelli (VC)

Government
  - Mayor: Giuseppe Rizzi

Area
  - Total: 19.0 km^{2} (7.3 sq mi)
- Elevation: 219 m (719 ft)

Population (Dec. 2004)
  - Total: 968
  - Density: 50.9/km^{2} (132/sq mi)
- Demonym: Lentesi
- Time zone: UTC+1 (CET)
  - Summer (DST): UTC+2 (CEST)
- Postal code: 13035
- Dialing code: 0163
- Website: Official website

Lenta is a comune (municipality) in the Province of Vercelli in the Italian region Piedmont, located about 80 kilometres (50 mi) northeast of Turin and about 25 kilometres (16 mi) north of Vercelli.

Lenta borders the following municipalities: Carpignano Sesia, Gattinara, Ghemme, Ghislarengo, and Rovasenda. In its territory is a site housing some 3,000 retired military vehicles of the Italian Army.
