= San Giacomo Vercellese =

- Comune
- Comune di San Giacomo Vercellese
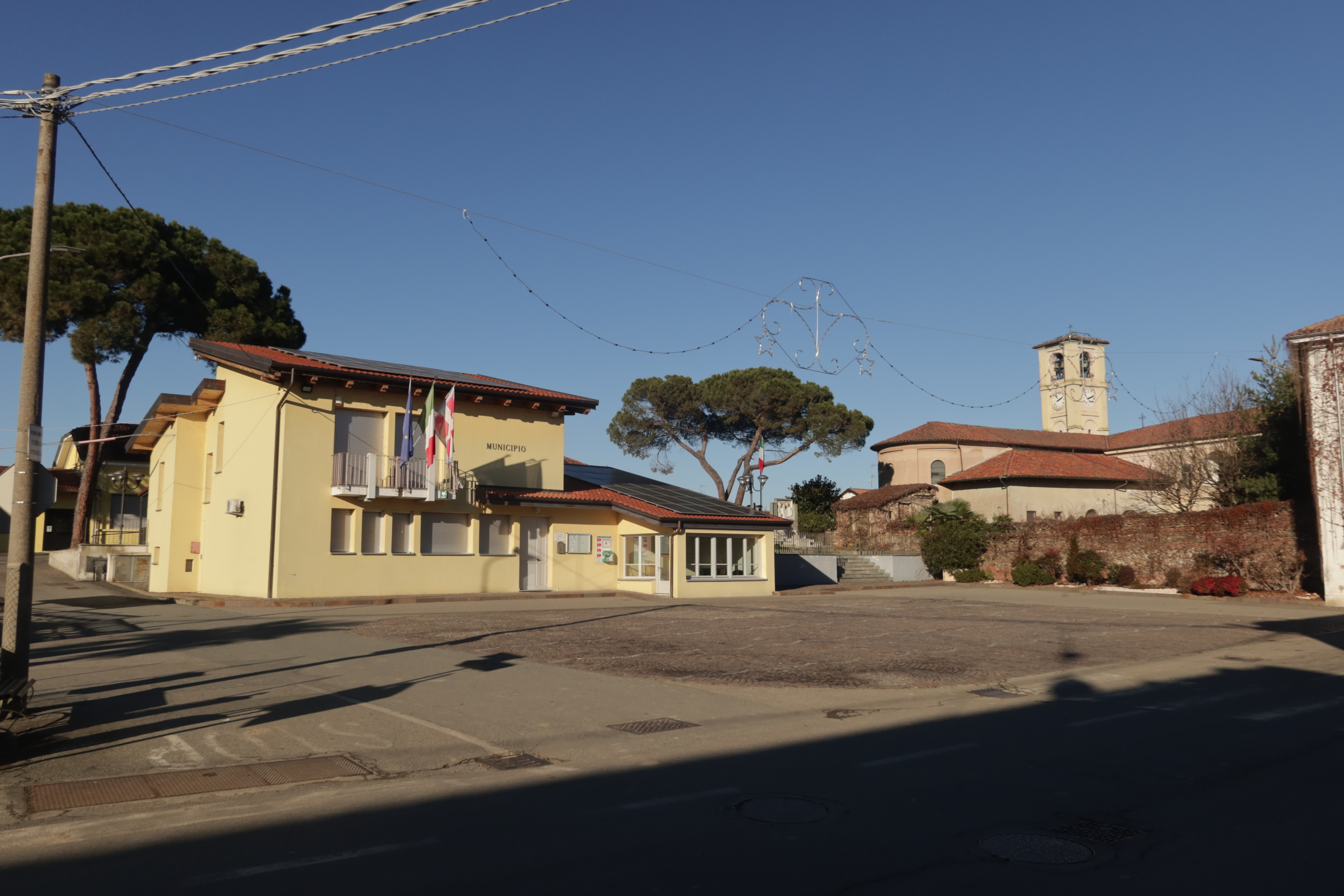

- Location within Italy Location within Piedmont
- Coordinates: 45°30′N 8°20′E
- Country: Italy
- Region: Piedmont
- Province: Vercelli (VC)

Government
  - Mayor: Massimo Camandona

Area
  - Total: 9.6 km^{2} (3.7 sq mi)
- Elevation: 197 m (646 ft)

Population (Dec. 2004)
  - Total: 352
  - Density: 37/km^{2} (95/sq mi)
- Demonym: Sangiacomesi
- Time zone: UTC+1 (CET)
  - Summer (DST): UTC+2 (CEST)
- Postal code: 13030
- Dialing code: 0161
- Website: Official website

San Giacomo Vercellese is a comune (municipality) in the Province of Vercelli in the Italian region Piedmont, located about 70 kilometres (43 mi) northeast of Turin and about 20 kilometres (12 mi) northwest of Vercelli.

San Giacomo Vercellese borders the following municipalities: Arborio, Balocco, Buronzo, Rovasenda, and Villarboit.
