= Santa Maria Assunta, Carpignano Sesia =

Church in Carpignano Sesia, Italy

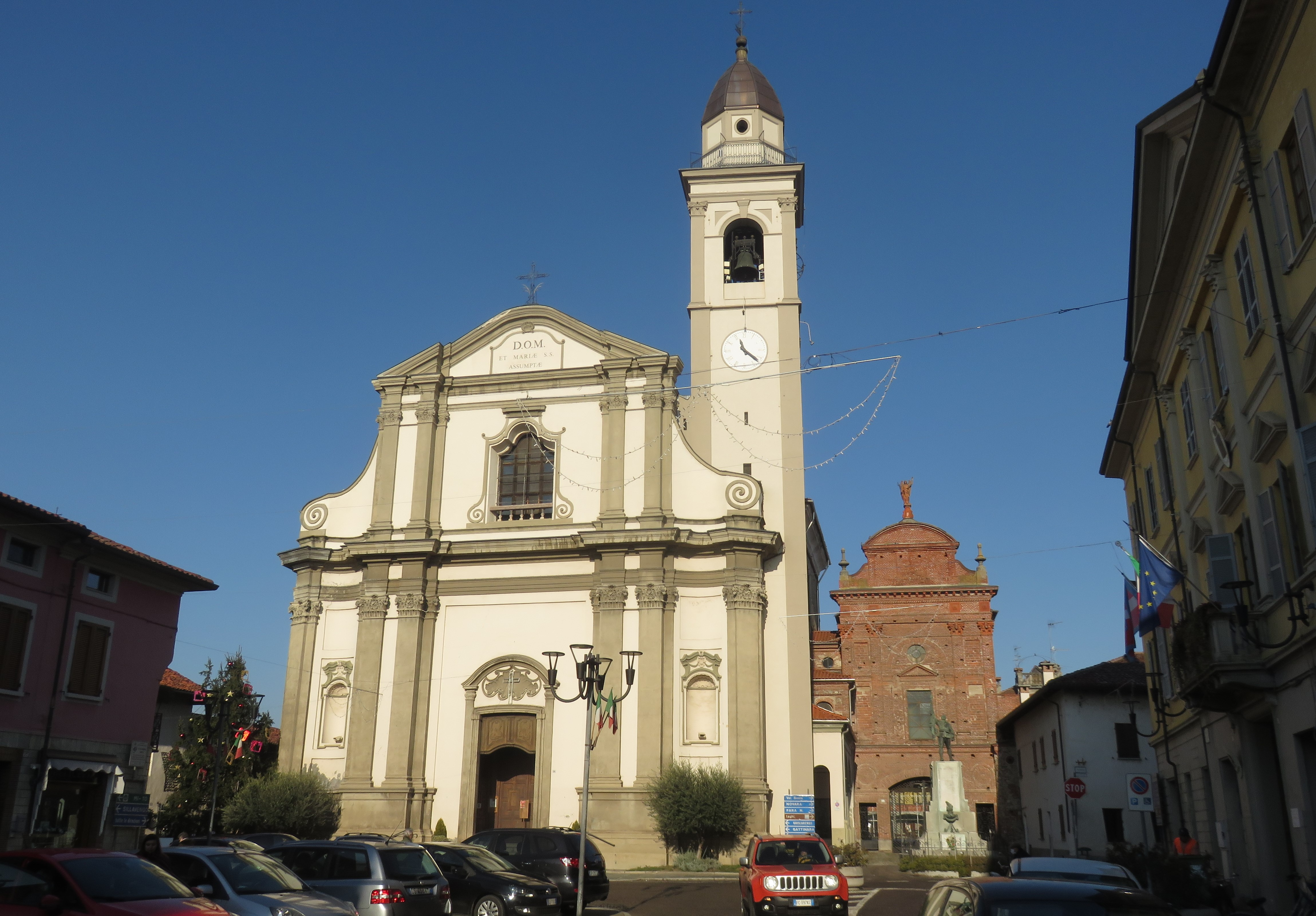

The Church of the Assumption of Mary (Italian: Chiesa di Santa Maria Assunta) is a Roman Catholic church building in Carpignano Sesia, province and diocese of Novara, Italy. It is dedicated to the Assumption of the Virgin.

The original church was built in medieval times; at the beginning of the 18th century, it had become too small, and Bishop Giovanni Battista Visconti Aicardi, noting its poor condition, ordered it to be rebuilt. The design for the new parish church was drawn up around 1710 by Carlo Zaninetti, but work did not begin until 1718. In 1756, the church complex was completed in its entirety, and on June 20, 1784, the consecration was celebrated.
