= Brusnengo =

- Comune
- Comune di Brusnengo
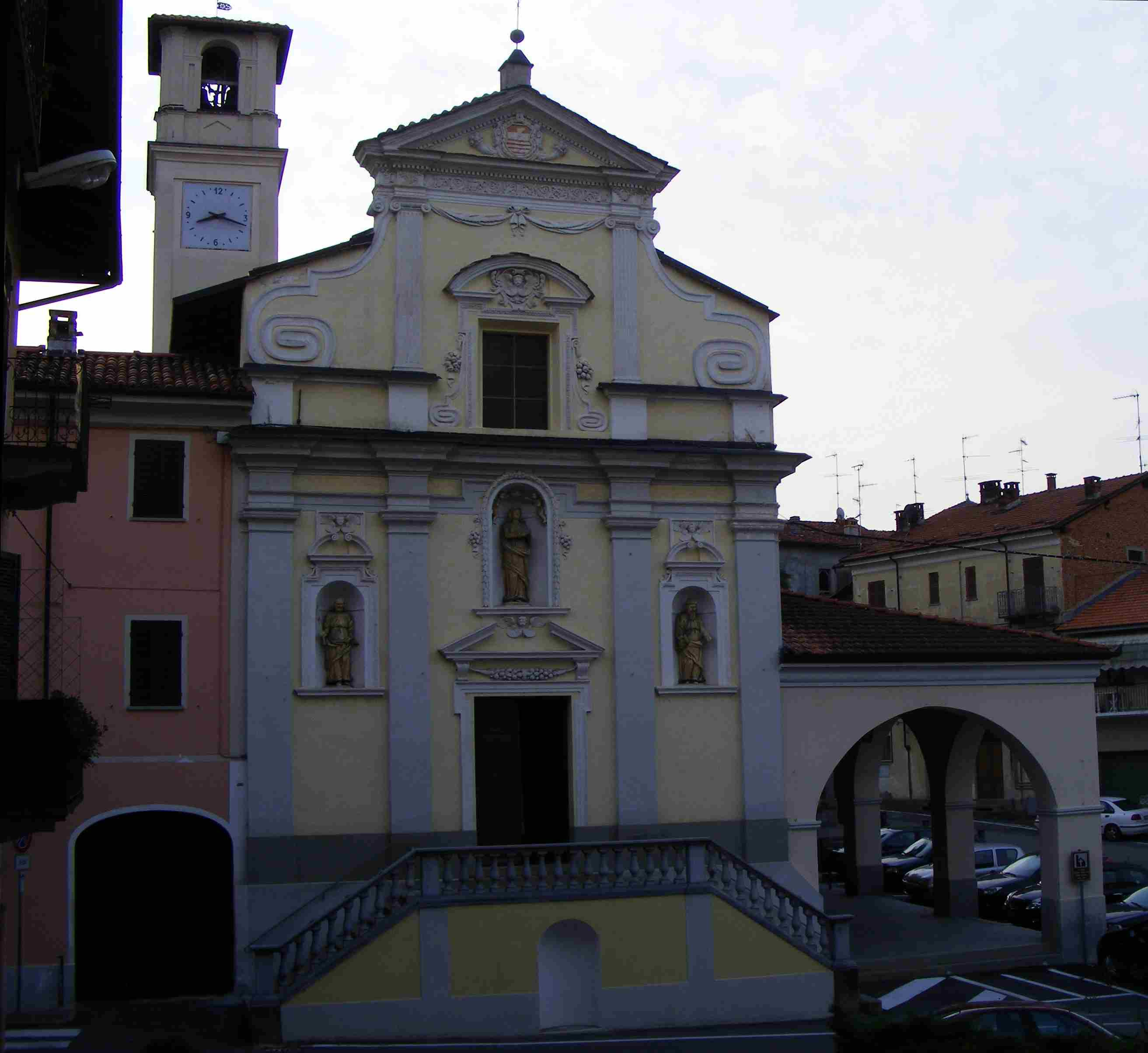
- Beata Vergine in Valle church

- Coat of arms

- Location within Italy Location within Piedmont
- Coordinates: 45°35′52″N 8°13′04″E
- Country: Italy
- Region: Piedmont
- Province: Biella (BI)
- Frazioni: Forte, Caraceto

Area
  - Total: 10.4 km^{2} (4.0 sq mi)
- Elevation: 200 m (660 ft)

Population (Dec. 2004)
  - Total: 2,127
  - Density: 205/km^{2} (530/sq mi)
- Demonym: Brusnenghesi
- Time zone: UTC+1 (CET)
  - Summer (DST): UTC+2 (CEST)
- Postal code: 13862
- Dialing code: 015
- Patron saint: St. Peter
- Saint day: June 29

Brusnengo is a comune (municipality) in the Province of Biella in the Italian region Piedmont, located about 70 kilometres (43 mi) northeast of Turin and about 12 kilometres (7 mi) northeast of Biella. As of 31 December 2004, it had a population of 2,127 and an area of 10.4 square kilometres (4.0 mi^{2}).

Brusnengo borders the following municipalities: Curino, Masserano, Roasio, Rovasenda.
