= Gattinara =

Gattinara Gatinera (Piedmontese)
- Comune
- Comune di Gattinara
- Location within Italy Location within Piedmont
- Coordinates: 45°37′0″N 8°22′0″E
- Country: Italy
- Region: Piedmont
- Province: Vercelli (VC)

Government
  - Mayor: Maria Vittoria Casazza

Area
  - Total: 33.5 km^{2} (12.9 sq mi)
- Elevation: 265 m (869 ft)

Population (Dec. 2004)
  - Total: 8,506
  - Density: 254/km^{2} (658/sq mi)
- Demonym: Gattinaresi
- Time zone: UTC+1 (CET)
  - Summer (DST): UTC+2 (CEST)
- Postal code: 13045
- Dialing code: 0163
- Patron saint: Saint Peter
- Saint day: 29 June
- Website: Official website

Gattinara (Piedmontese: Gatinera) is a comune (municipality) in the Province of Vercelli in the Italian region of Piedmont, located about 80 kilometres (50 mi) northeast of Turin and about 35 kilometres (22 mi) north of Vercelli. As of 31 December 2004, it had a population of 8,506 and an area of 33.5 square kilometres (12.9 mi^{2}).

Gattinara is notable for its Gattinara DOCG red wine.

Gattinara borders the following municipalities: Ghemme, Lenta, Lozzolo, Roasio, Romagnano Sesia, Rovasenda, Prato Sesia and Serravalle Sesia.

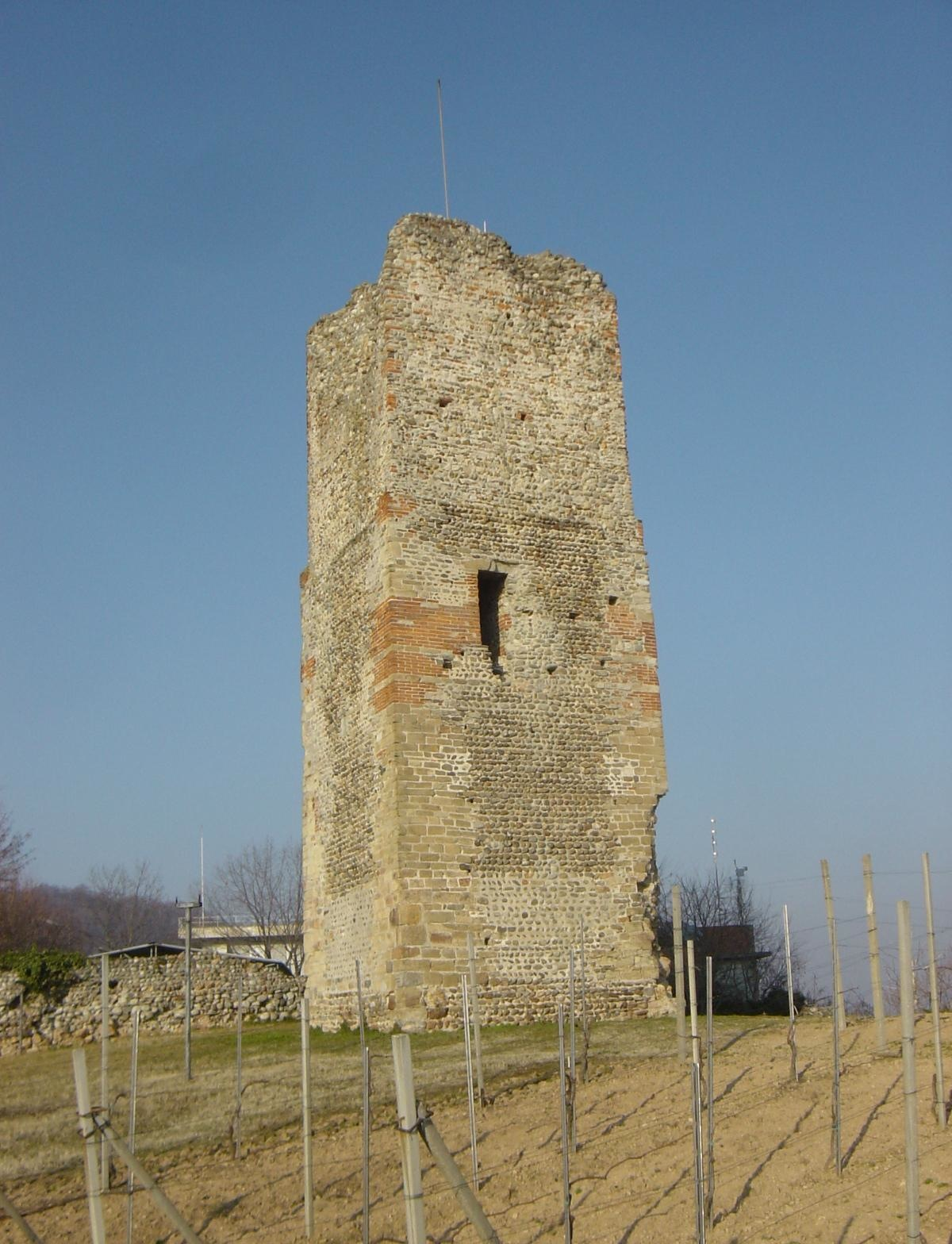
Castelle tower

== Demographic evolution ==
Historical population

Year	Pop.	±%
1861	4,476	—
1871	4,722	+5.5%
1881	5,010	+6.1%
1901	5,591	+11.6%
1911	5,493	−1.8%

Year	Pop.	±%
1921	5,004	−8.9%
1931	5,441	+8.7%
1936	5,827	+7.1%
1951	6,287	+7.9%
1961	8,103	+28.9%

Year	Pop.	±%
1971	9,533	+17.6%
1981	9,467	−0.7%
1991	8,701	−8.1%
2001	8,612	−1.0%

Source: Data from ISTAT

== Notable residents ==
- Mercurino Arborio (1465–1530), marchese di Gattinara, statesman and jurist
- Angelo Martino Colombo (1935–2014), footballer
- Piero Gibellino (1926–2003), footballer
