= Piero Gibellino =

Italian footballer

Personal information
- Date of birth: 29 March 1926
- Place of birth: Gattinara, Kingdom of Italy
- Date of death: 5 July 2003 (aged 77)
- Place of death: Gattinara, Italy
- Position: Defender

Senior career*
Years	Team	Apps	(Gls)
1946–1947	Gattinara		
1947–1948	Juventus	14	(0)
- * Club domestic league appearances and goals

Piero Gibellino (29 March 1926 – 5 July 2003) was an Italian professional football player.
