= Ghislarengo =

- Comune
- Comune di Ghislarengo
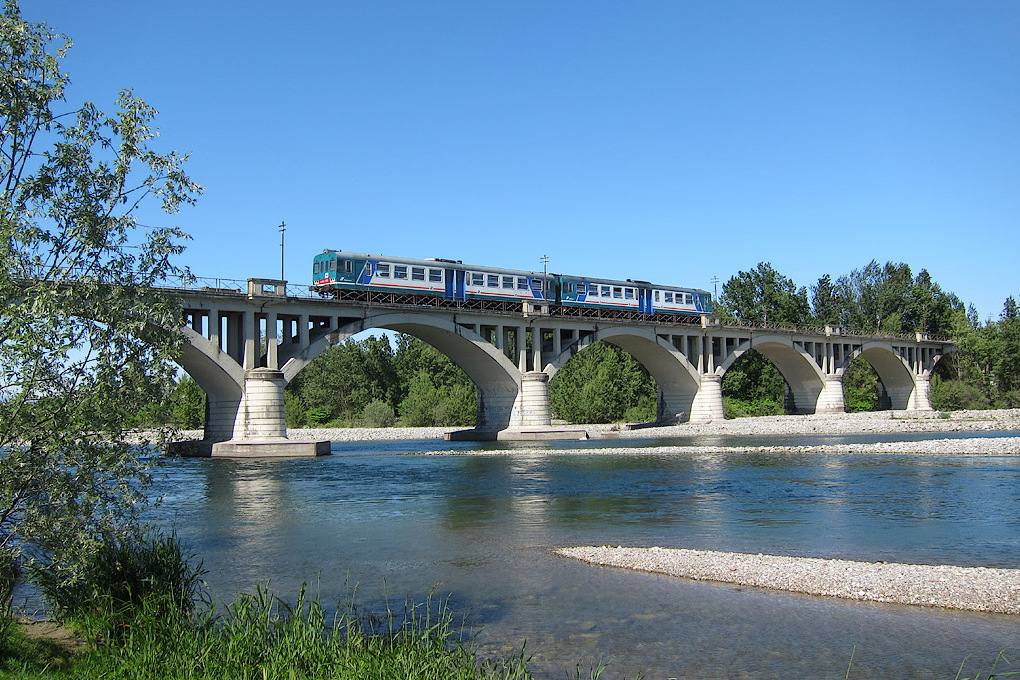
- Railway bridge on the Sesia river.

- Location within Italy Location within Piedmont
- Coordinates: 45°30′N 8°23′E
- Country: Italy
- Region: Piedmont
- Province: Vercelli (VC)

Government
  - Mayor: Martina Rinolfi

Area
  - Total: 12.5 km^{2} (4.8 sq mi)
- Elevation: 206 m (676 ft)

Population (Dec. 2004)
  - Total: 870
  - Density: 70/km^{2} (180/sq mi)
- Demonym: Ghislarenghesi
- Time zone: UTC+1 (CET)
  - Summer (DST): UTC+2 (CEST)
- Postal code: 13030
- Dialing code: 0161
- Website: Official website

Ghislarengo is a comune (municipality) in the Province of Vercelli in the Italian region Piedmont, located about 70 kilometres (43 mi) northeast of Turin and about 20 kilometres (12 mi) north of Vercelli.

Ghislarengo borders the following municipalities: Arborio, Carpignano Sesia, Lenta, Rovasenda, and Sillavengo.
