= Carpignano Sesia =

- Comune
- Comune di Carpignano Sesia
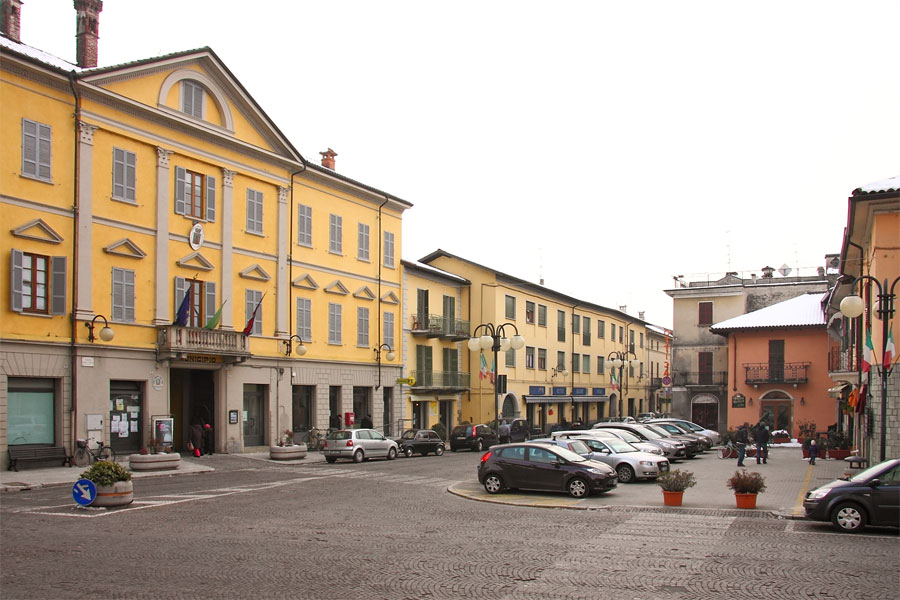
- View of Carpignano Sesia

- Location within Italy Location within Piedmont
- Coordinates: 45°32′N 8°26′E
- Country: Italy
- Region: Piedmont
- Province: Novara (NO)

Government
  - Mayor: Giuseppe Maio

Area
  - Total: 14.8 km^{2} (5.7 sq mi)
- Elevation: 204 m (669 ft)

Population (Dec. 2004)
  - Total: 2,572
  - Density: 174/km^{2} (450/sq mi)
- Demonym: Carpignanesi
- Time zone: UTC+1 (CET)
  - Summer (DST): UTC+2 (CEST)
- Postal code: 28064
- Dialing code: 0321
- Website: Official website

Carpignano Sesia is a comune (municipality) in the Province of Novara in the Italian region Piedmont, located about 80 kilometres (50 mi) northeast of Turin and about 15 kilometres (9 mi) northwest of Novara.

Carpignano Sesia borders the following municipalities: Briona, Fara Novarese, Ghemme, Ghislarengo, Lenta, Sillavengo, and Sizzano.

== Main sights ==
- "Castle" (Ricetto), a group of walls with fortified houses in the historic center, built in the 11th centuries by the Counts of Pombia
- Church of San Pietro, located in the ricetto, known from as early as the 11th century. It houses some Gothic-style frescoes (1st century)
- Church of the Assumption of Mary

== Twin towns ==
Carpignano Sesia is twinned with:

- Mathay, France
