= Rovasenda =

- Comune
- Comune di Rovasenda
- Location within Italy Location within Piedmont
- Coordinates: 45°32′N 8°19′E
- Country: Italy
- Region: Piedmont
- Province: Province of Vercelli (VC)

Area
  - Total: 29.3 km^{2} (11.3 sq mi)

Population (Dec. 2004)
  - Total: 1,010
  - Density: 34.5/km^{2} (89.3/sq mi)
- Time zone: UTC+1 (CET)
  - Summer (DST): UTC+2 (CEST)
- Postal code: 13040
- Dialing code: 0161
- Website: Official website

Rovasenda is a comune (municipality) in the Province of Vercelli in the Italian region of Piedmont, located about 70 kilometres (43 mi) northeast of Turin and 25 kilometres (16 mi) northwest of Vercelli. As of 31 December 2020, it had a population of 1,025 and an area of 29.3 square kilometres (11.3 mi^{2}).

Rovasenda borders the following municipalities: Arborio, Brusnengo, Buronzo, Gattinara, Ghislarengo, Lenta, Masserano, Roasio, and San Giacomo Vercellese.

== Geography ==
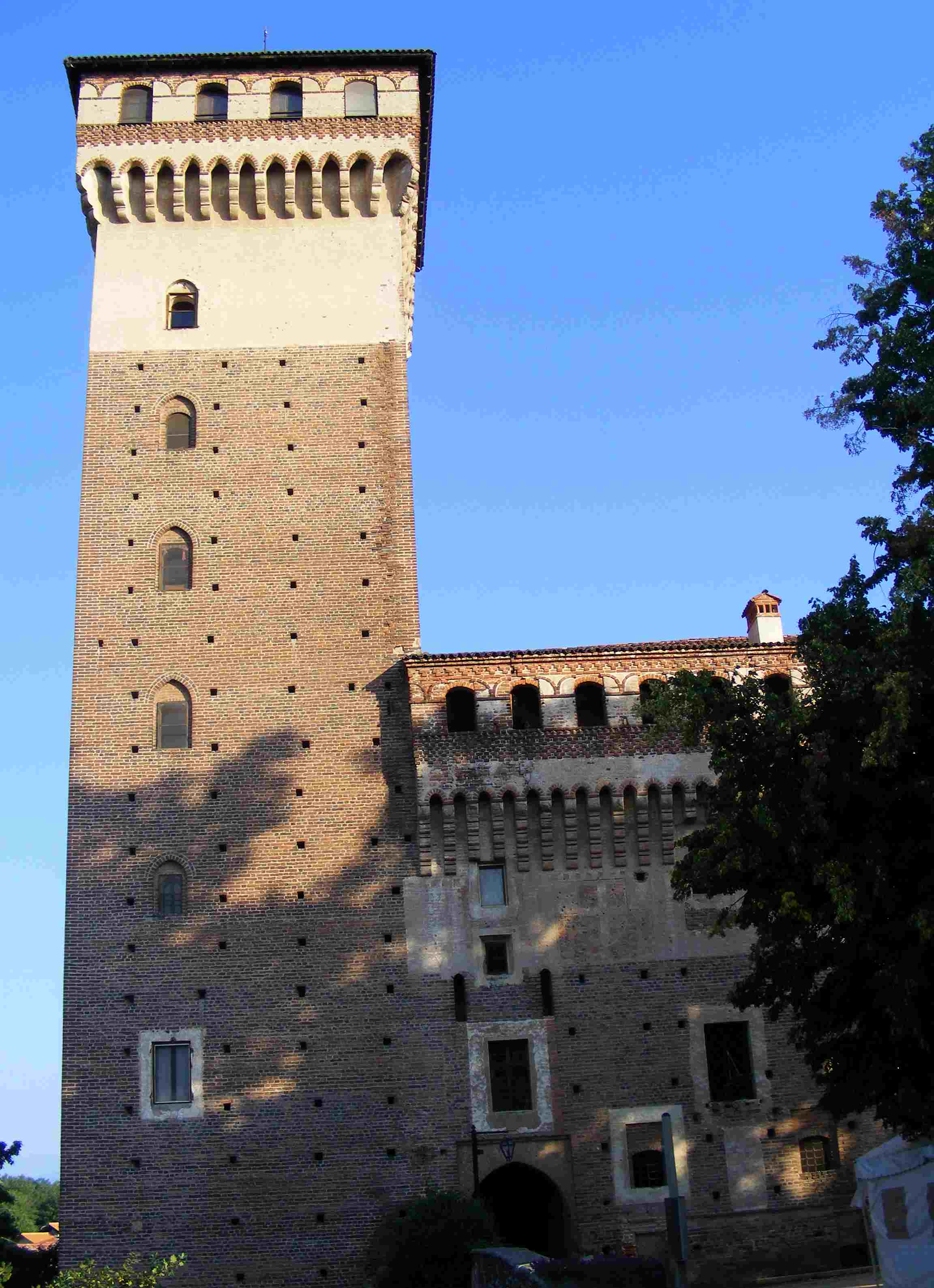
medieval castle

The territory of the comune of Rovasenda is enclosed in the alta pianura vercellese (high plain of Vercelli, also known as Baraggia). The land is levelled, with a slight inclination from north to the south. Its altitude varies from 259 to 199 m above sea level.; the Comune is about 9 km from north to south and 5 km from east to west. It borders Roasio e Gattinara to the north, Lenta, Ghislarengo e Arborio to the east, San Giacomo Vercellese and Buronzo to the south and Masserano and Brusnengo to the west, which form part of the province of Biella.
The comune's territory comprises the Rovasenda stream as well as the Marchiazza stream, which marks part of its eastern boundary. Numerous irrigation canals supply the surrounding rice paddies with water; among these, the Roggia del Marchese (also known as Roggia Marchionale) is the most noteworthy.
Most of the settlements are found within the main administrative division (capoluogo), surrounded by vast rice fields speckled with sparse, secluded farmhouses; aside from the capoluogo, there are no divisions of relevant size.
Rovasenda is located at the crossroads of two railway lines, the Santhià-Arona railway and the Biella-Novara railway; oddly enough the town has two separate yet adjacent railway stations (the Rovasenda and Rovasenda Alta railway stations, on the Biella-Novara and the Santhià-Arona railway lines, respectively).

== Demographic evolution ==
Historical population

Year	Pop.	±%
1861	446	—
1871	624	+39.9%
1881	874	+40.1%
1901	1,084	+24.0%
1911	1,154	+6.5%

Year	Pop.	±%
1921	1,010	−12.5%
1931	1,107	+9.6%
1936	1,115	+0.7%
1951	1,127	+1.1%
1961	1,074	−4.7%

Year	Pop.	±%
1971	948	−11.7%
1981	1,068	+12.7%
1991	1,056	−1.1%
2001	1,010	−4.4%

Source: Data from ISTAT

== See also ==
- Rovasenda (stream)
