= Villa del Bosco =

- Comune
- Comune di Villa del Bosco
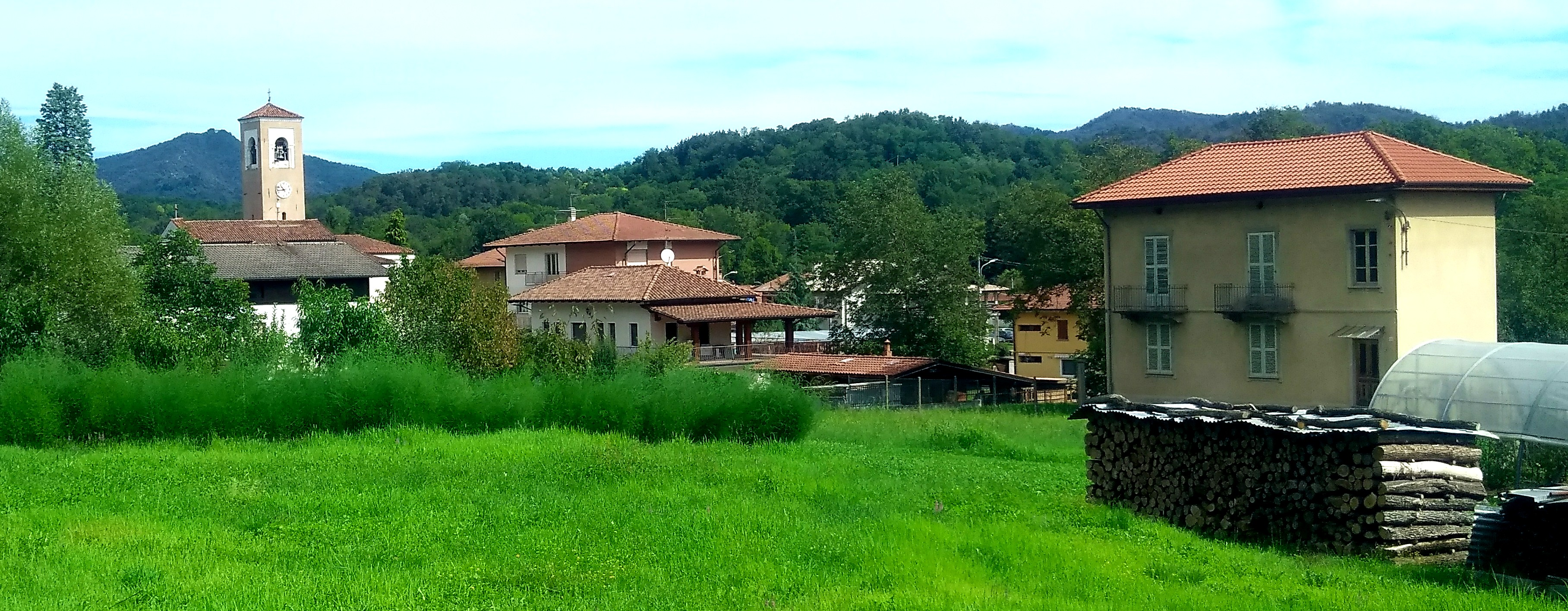
- View of Villa del Bosco

- Coat of arms

- Location within Italy Location within Piedmont
- Coordinates: 45°38′N 8°19′E
- Country: Italy
- Region: Piedmont
- Province: Biella (BI)

Government
  - Mayor: Alessandro Todaro

Area
  - Total: 3.7 km^{2} (1.4 sq mi)
- Elevation: 293 m (961 ft)

Population (31 December 2010)
  - Total: 379
  - Density: 100/km^{2} (270/sq mi)
- Demonym: Villadelboschesi
- Time zone: UTC+1 (CET)
  - Summer (DST): UTC+2 (CEST)
- Postal code: 13868
- Dialing code: 0163
- Website: www.comune.villadelbosco.bi.it

Villa del Bosco is a comune (municipality) in the Province of Biella in the Italian region Piedmont, located about 80 kilometres (50 mi) northeast of Turin and about 20 kilometres (12 mi) northeast of Biella.

Villa del Bosco borders the following municipalities: Curino, Lozzolo, Roasio, Sostegno.
