= Scurzolengo =

- Comune
- Comune di Scurzolengo
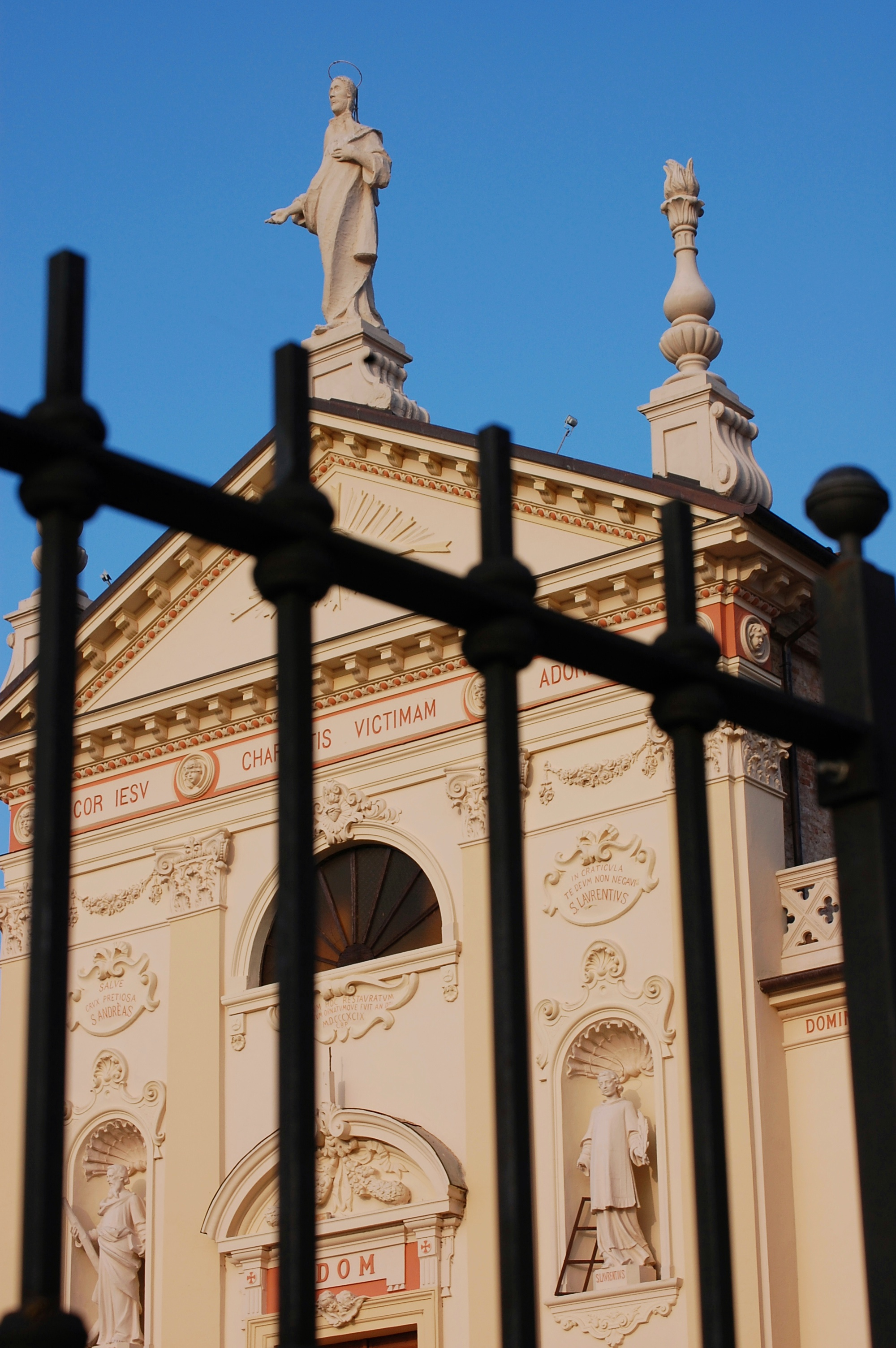

- Location within Italy Location within Piedmont
- Coordinates: 44°58′N 8°17′E
- Country: Italy
- Region: Piedmont
- Province: Asti (AT)

Government
  - Mayor: Gianni Maiocco

Area
  - Total: 5.3 km^{2} (2.0 sq mi)

Population (31 December 2010)
  - Total: 610
  - Density: 120/km^{2} (300/sq mi)
- Demonym: Scurzolenghesi
- Time zone: UTC+1 (CET)
  - Summer (DST): UTC+2 (CEST)
- Postal code: 14030
- Dialing code: 0141

Scurzolengo is a comune (municipality) in the Province of Asti in the Italian region Piedmont, located about 45 kilometres (28 mi) east of Turin and about 10 kilometres (6 mi) northeast of Asti.

Scurzolengo borders the following municipalities: Calliano, Castagnole Monferrato, and Portacomaro.

== People ==
- Piero Dusio (1899–1975), footballer, businessman and racing driver.
