= Lozzolo =

- Comune
- Comune di Lozzolo
- Coat of arms

- Location within Italy Location within Piedmont
- Coordinates: 45°38′N 8°19′E
- Country: Italy
- Region: Piedmont
- Province: Province of Vercelli (VC)

Government
  - Mayor: Roberto Sella

Area
  - Total: 6.7 km^{2} (2.6 sq mi)

Population (Dec. 2004)
  - Total: 797
  - Density: 120/km^{2} (310/sq mi)
- Time zone: UTC+1 (CET)
  - Summer (DST): UTC+2 (CEST)
- Postal code: 13060
- Dialing code: 0163
- Website: Official website

Lozzolo is a comune (municipality) in the Province of Vercelli in the Italian region Piedmont, located about 80 kilometres (50 mi) northeast of Turin and about 35 kilometres (22 mi) north of Vercelli. As of 31 December 2004, it had a population of 797 and an area of 6.7 square kilometres (2.6 mi^{2}).

Lozzolo borders the following municipalities: Gattinara, Roasio, Serravalle Sesia, Sostegno, and Villa del Bosco.

== Demographic evolution ==
Historical population

Year	Pop.	±%
1861	655	—
1871	726	+10.8%
1881	811	+11.7%
1901	848	+4.6%
1911	893	+5.3%

Year	Pop.	±%
1921	932	+4.4%
1931	985	+5.7%
1936	932	−5.4%
1951	883	−5.3%
1961	899	+1.8%

Year	Pop.	±%
1971	860	−4.3%
1981	901	+4.8%
1991	815	−9.5%
2001	816	+0.1%

Source: Data from ISTAT

== Twin towns ==
Lozzolo is twinned with:

- Castiglione d'Adda, Italy
