= Sostegno =

- Comune
- Comune di Sostegno
- Coat of arms

- Location within Italy Location within Piedmont
- Coordinates: 45°39′N 8°16′E
- Country: Italy
- Region: Piedmont
- Province: Biella (BI)
- Frazioni: Casa del Bosco, Asei

Government
  - Mayor: Giuseppe Framorando

Area
  - Total: 18.1 km^{2} (7.0 sq mi)
- Elevation: 378 m (1,240 ft)

Population (31 December 2010)
  - Total: 761
  - Density: 42.0/km^{2} (109/sq mi)
- Demonym: Sostegnèsi
- Time zone: UTC+1 (CET)
  - Summer (DST): UTC+2 (CEST)
- Postal code: 13868
- Dialing code: 015
- Website: www.comune.sostegno.bi.it

Sostegno is a comune (municipality) in the Province of Biella in the Italian region Piedmont, located about 80 kilometres (50 mi) northeast of Turin and about 20 kilometres (12 mi) northeast of Biella.

Sostegno borders the following municipalities: Crevacuore, Curino, Lozzolo, Roasio, Serravalle Sesia, Villa del Bosco. Economy is based on the production of apples and wine.
