= Roasio =

- Comune
- Comune di Roasio
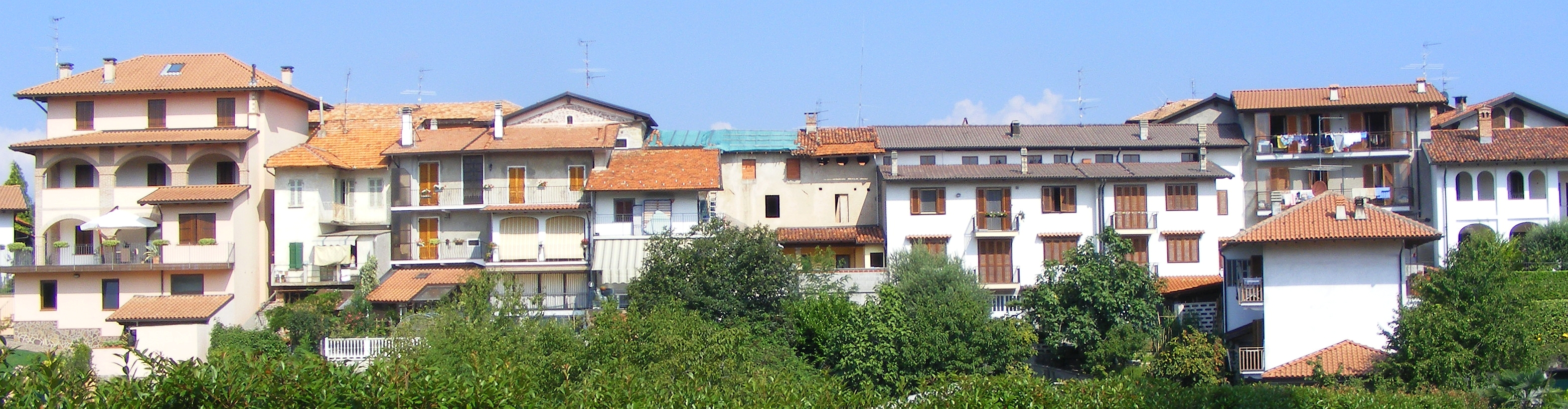

- Location within Italy Location within Piedmont
- Coordinates: 45°37′N 8°17′E
- Country: Italy
- Region: Piedmont
- Province: Province of Vercelli (VC)
- Frazioni: San Maurizio, Castelletto Villa, San Giorgio, Sant' Eusebio, Corticella, Curavecchia, Prucengo

Area
  - Total: 28.1 km^{2} (10.8 sq mi)
- Elevation: 278 m (912 ft)

Population (Dec. 2004)
  - Total: 2,517
  - Density: 89.6/km^{2} (232/sq mi)
- Demonym: Roasiani
- Time zone: UTC+1 (CET)
  - Summer (DST): UTC+2 (CEST)
- Postal code: 13060
- Dialing code: 0163
- Website: Official website

Roasio is a comune (municipality) in the Province of Vercelli in the Italian region Piedmont, located about 80 kilometres (50 mi) northeast of Turin and about 35 kilometres (22 mi) northwest of Vercelli. As of 31 December 2004, it had a population of 2,517 and an area of 28.1 square kilometres (10.8 mi^{2}).

The municipality of Roasio contains the frazioni (subdivisions, mainly villages and hamlets) San Maurizio, Castelletto Villa, San Giorgio, Sant' Eusebio, Corticella, Curavecchia, and Prucengo.

Roasio borders the following municipalities: Brusnengo, Curino, Gattinara, Lozzolo, Rovasenda, Sostegno, and Villa del Bosco.

== Demographic evolution ==
Historical population

Year	Pop.	±%
1861	2,761	—
1871	2,974	+7.7%
1881	3,129	+5.2%
1901	3,008	−3.9%
1911	3,207	+6.6%

Year	Pop.	±%
1921	3,003	−6.4%
1931	3,003	+0.0%
1936	2,688	−10.5%
1951	2,717	+1.1%
1961	2,588	−4.7%

Year	Pop.	±%
1971	2,438	−5.8%
1981	2,630	+7.9%
1991	2,495	−5.1%
2001	2,462	−1.3%

Source: Data from ISTAT
