= Rovasenda Alta railway station =

Railway station in Italy

Rovasenda Alta
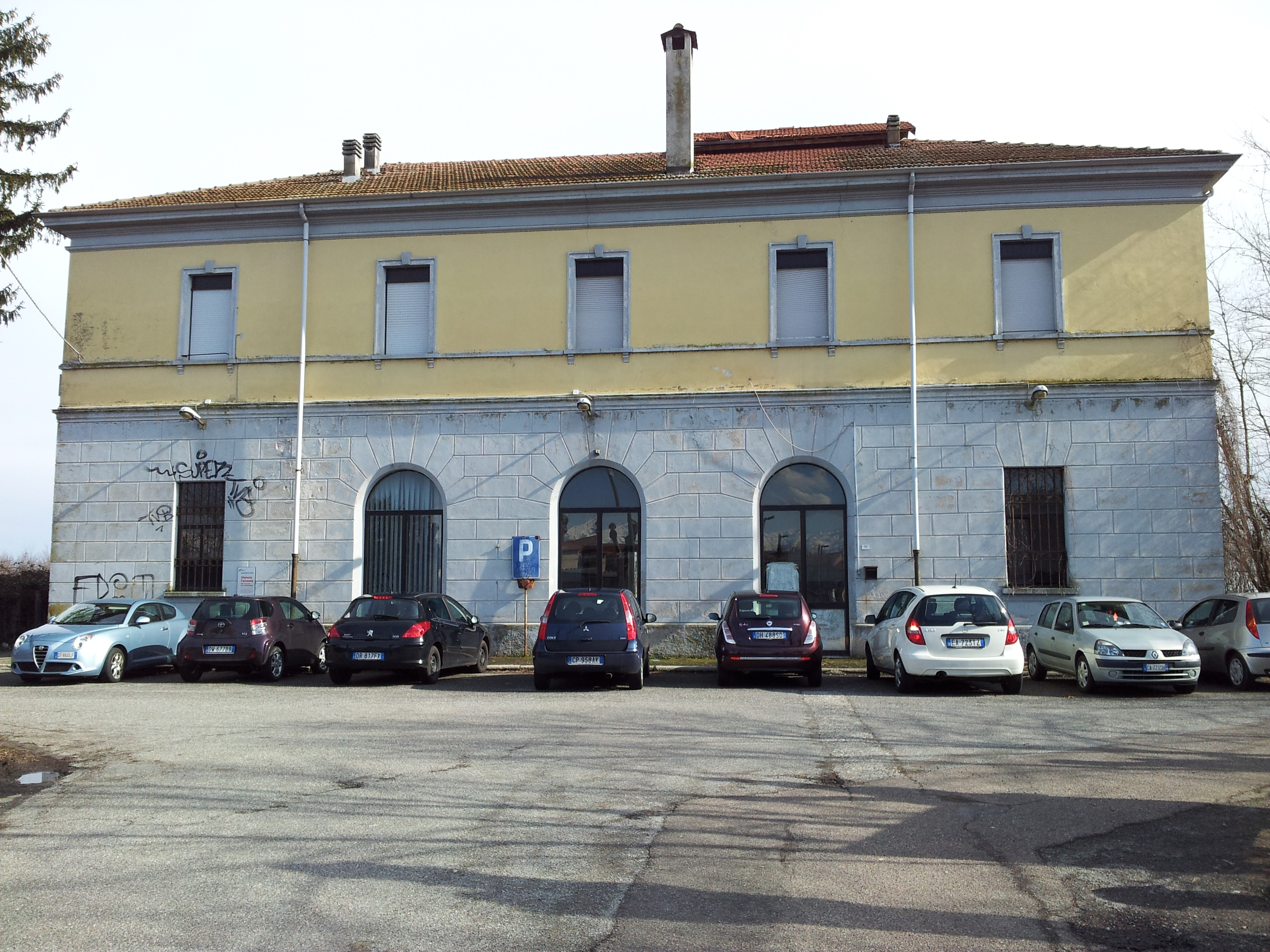
- Side station parking.

General information
- Location: Via Roma, 10; 13040 Rovasenda VC; Rovasenda, Vercelli, Piedmont; Italy
- Coordinates: 45°32′14″N 08°18′59″E
- Operator: Rete Ferroviaria Italiana
- Line: Santhià–Arona
- Distance: 22.121 km (13.745 mi) from Santhià
- Platforms: 2
- Train operators: Trenitalia
- Connections: Rovasenda (low) railway station; Suburban buses

Other information
- Classification: Bronze

History
- Opened: 16 January 1905; 121 years ago
Location
- Location within Piedmont Location within Northern Italy Location within Italy

Rovasenda railway station (Italian: Stazione di Rovasenda Alta) is one of two train stations, serving the comune of Rovasenda (situated in the mount part of the hill), in the Piedmont region, northwestern Italy. The name "Alta" (High) has been assigned to distinguish by the station low. It is the junction of the Santhià–Arona. It also serves as an interchange with station Rovasenda (low) on the Biella–Novara line.

The station has remained without traffic since 17 June 2012, because of the suspension of service on the railway, by the decision of the Piedmont Region. The station was managed by Rete Ferroviaria Italiana (RFI). Train services were operated by Trenitalia. Each of these companies is a subsidiary of Ferrovie dello Stato (FS), Italy's state-owned rail company.

== History ==
The station was opened on 16 January 1905, upon the inauguration of the first part of the Santhià–Arona railway, from Santhià to Borgomanero.

== Features ==
Two tracks of which are equipped with platforms.

== See also ==
- History of rail transport in Italy
- List of railway stations in Piedmont
- Rail transport in Italy
- Railway stations in Italy
