= Penango =

- Comune
- Comune di Penango
- Coat of arms

- Location within Italy Location within Piedmont
- Coordinates: 45°2′N 8°15′E
- Country: Italy
- Region: Piedmont
- Province: Asti (AT)
- Frazioni: Cioccaro

Government
  - Mayor: Cristina Enrica Patelli

Area
  - Total: 9.56 km^{2} (3.69 sq mi)
- Elevation: 264 m (866 ft)

Population (31 December 2019)
  - Total: 460
  - Density: 48/km^{2} (120/sq mi)
- Demonym: Penanghesi
- Time zone: UTC+1 (CET)
  - Summer (DST): UTC+2 (CEST)
- Postal code: 14030
- Dialing code: 0141
- Patron saint: St. Gratus of Aosta
- Saint day: September 7
- Website: Official website

Penango is a comune (municipality) in the Province of Asti in the Italian region Piedmont, located about 45 kilometres (28 mi) east of Turin and about 15 kilometres (9 mi) north of Asti.
