= Ricetto =

Medieval Italian fortified area for village stores

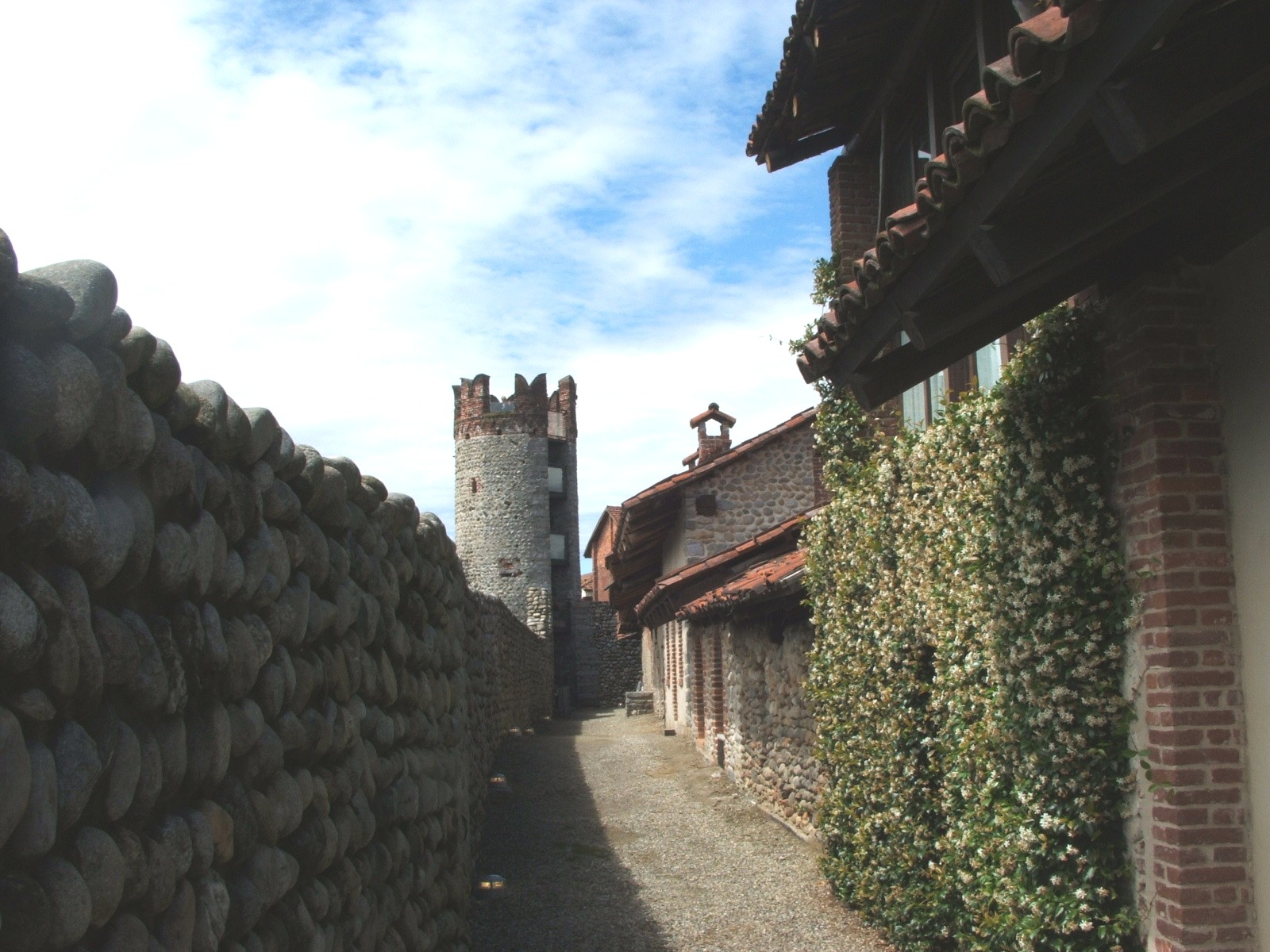
Ricetto at Candelo, Province of Biella, Piedmont, Italy

A ricetto was a small fortified area used in medieval Italian villages for storing agricultural products, livestock, and working tools. It was also sometimes used for protection of the residents in case of attack, particularly from marauders, and bands of soldiers and mercenaries from invading armies. A ricetto typically consisted of multiple buildings enclosed within a thick pentagonal perimeter, sometimes accompanied by a guard tower.
