= Castagnole Monferrato =

- Comune
- Comune di Castagnole Monferrato
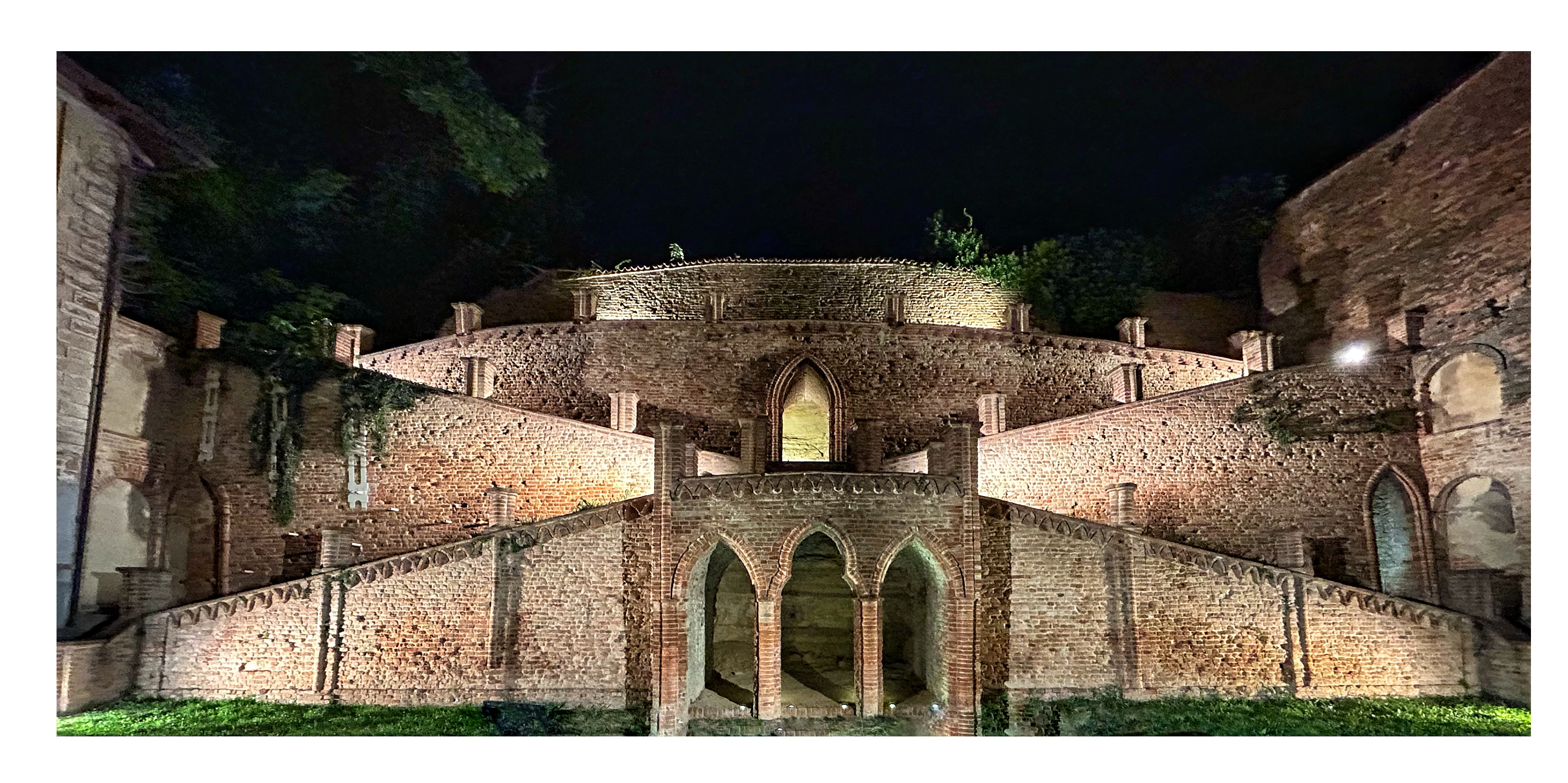

- Coat of arms

- Location within Italy Location within Piedmont
- Coordinates: 44°58′N 8°18′E
- Country: Italy
- Region: Piedmont
- Province: Asti (AT)
- Frazioni: Barcara, Valenzani, Valvinera

Government
  - Mayor: Enzo Baraldi

Area
  - Total: 17.3 km^{2} (6.7 sq mi)
- Elevation: 232 m (761 ft)

Population (31 December 2010)
  - Total: 1,270
  - Density: 73.4/km^{2} (190/sq mi)
- Demonym: Castagnolesi
- Time zone: UTC+1 (CET)
  - Summer (DST): UTC+2 (CEST)
- Postal code: 14030
- Dialing code: 0141
- Patron saint: St. Anne
- Saint day: 26 July

Castagnole Monferrato is a comune (municipality) in the Province of Asti in the Italian region Piedmont, located about 50 kilometres (31 mi) east of Turin and about 11 kilometres (7 mi) northeast of Asti.
