= Marche (Turin Metro) =

Turin Metro station

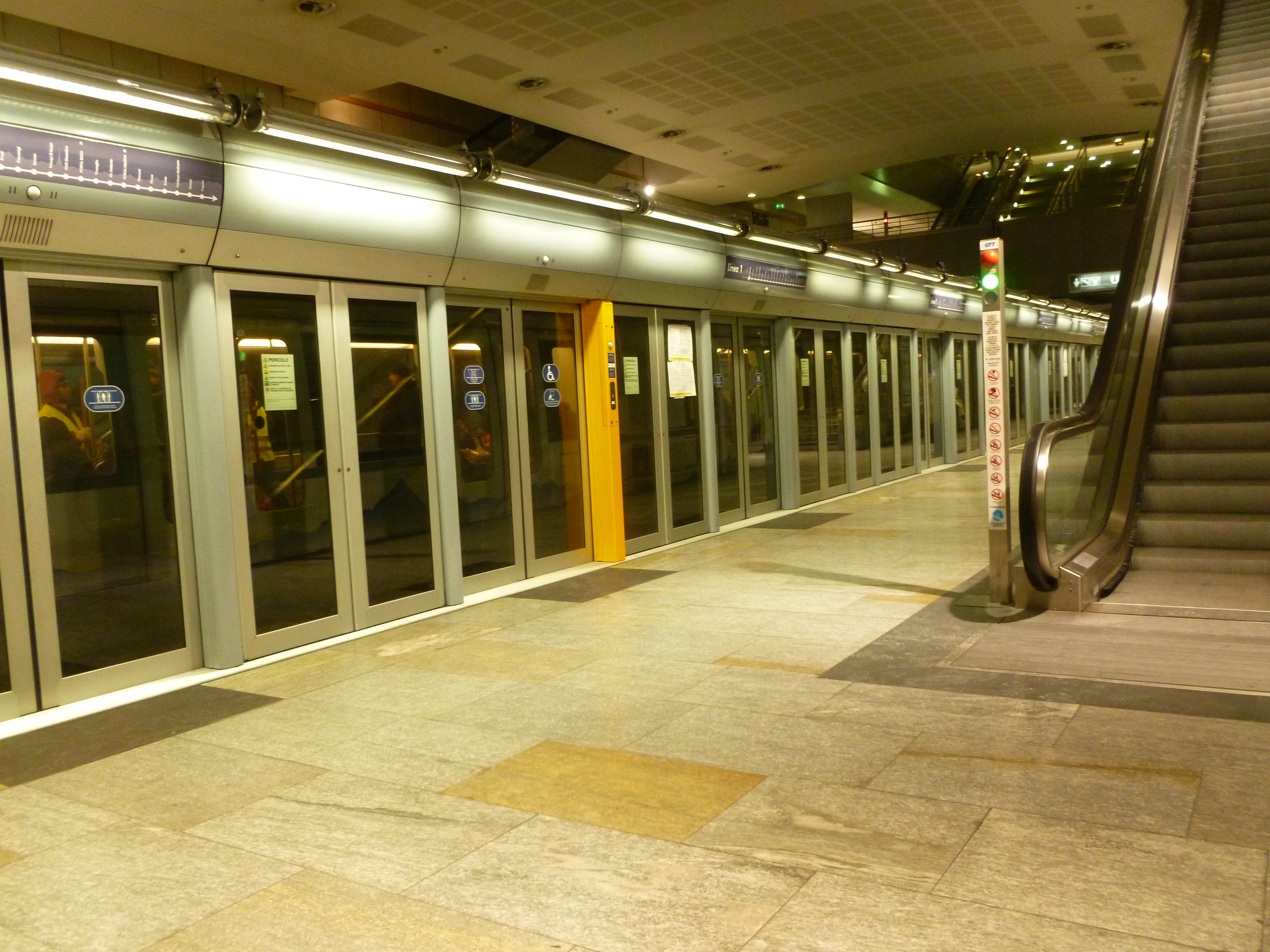

General information
- Location: Corso Francia, Collegno
- Coordinates: 45°04′27″N 7°36′50″E
- Owner: GTT
- Platforms: 2
- Tracks: 2

Construction
- Structure type: Underground
- Accessible: Yes

History
- Opened: 4 February 2006

Services
| Preceding station | Turin Metro | Following station |
|---|---|---|
| Paradiso towards Fermi | Line 1 | Massaua towards Bengasi |
Location

Marche is a Turin Metro station, located in Corso Francia, near Via Eritrea and Corso Marche. The station was opened on 4 February 2006 as part of the inaugural section of Turin Metro, between Fermi and XVIII Dicembre.

The platforms feature decals by Ugo Nespolo, depicting futurist scenes.

== Services ==
- Parking lot with 449 spaces
- Ticket vending machines
- Handicap accessibility
- Elevators
- Escalators
- Active CCTV surveillance
