= Monte Grappa (Turin Metro) =

Turin Metro station

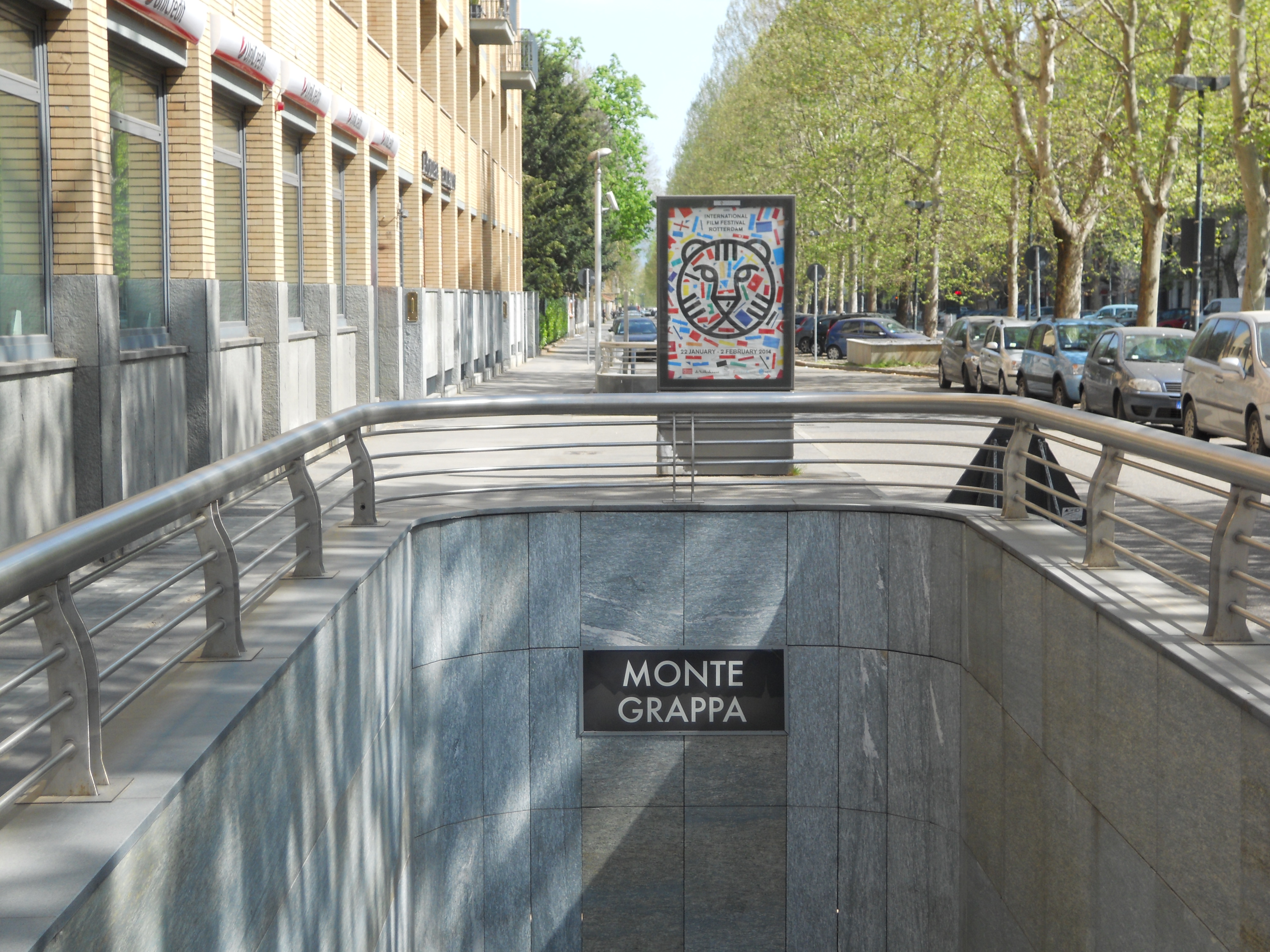

General information
- Location: Corso Francia, Turin
- Coordinates: 45°04′31″N 7°38′09″E
- Owner: GTT
- Platforms: 2
- Tracks: 2

Construction
- Structure type: Underground
- Accessible: Yes

History
- Opened: 4 February 2006

Services
Preceding station	Turin Metro	Following station
Pozzo Strada towards Fermi	Line 1	Rivoli towards Bengasi
Location

Monte Grappa is a Turin Metro station, located in Corso Francia near the intersection between Corso Monte Grappa and Corso Monte Cucco. The station was opened on 4 February 2006 as part of the inaugural section of Turin Metro, between Fermi and XVIII Dicembre.

The platforms feature decals by Ugo Nespolo.

== Services ==
- Ticket vending machines
- Handicap accessibility
- Elevators
- Escalators
- Active CCTV surveillance
