= Bernini (Turin Metro) =

Turin Metro station

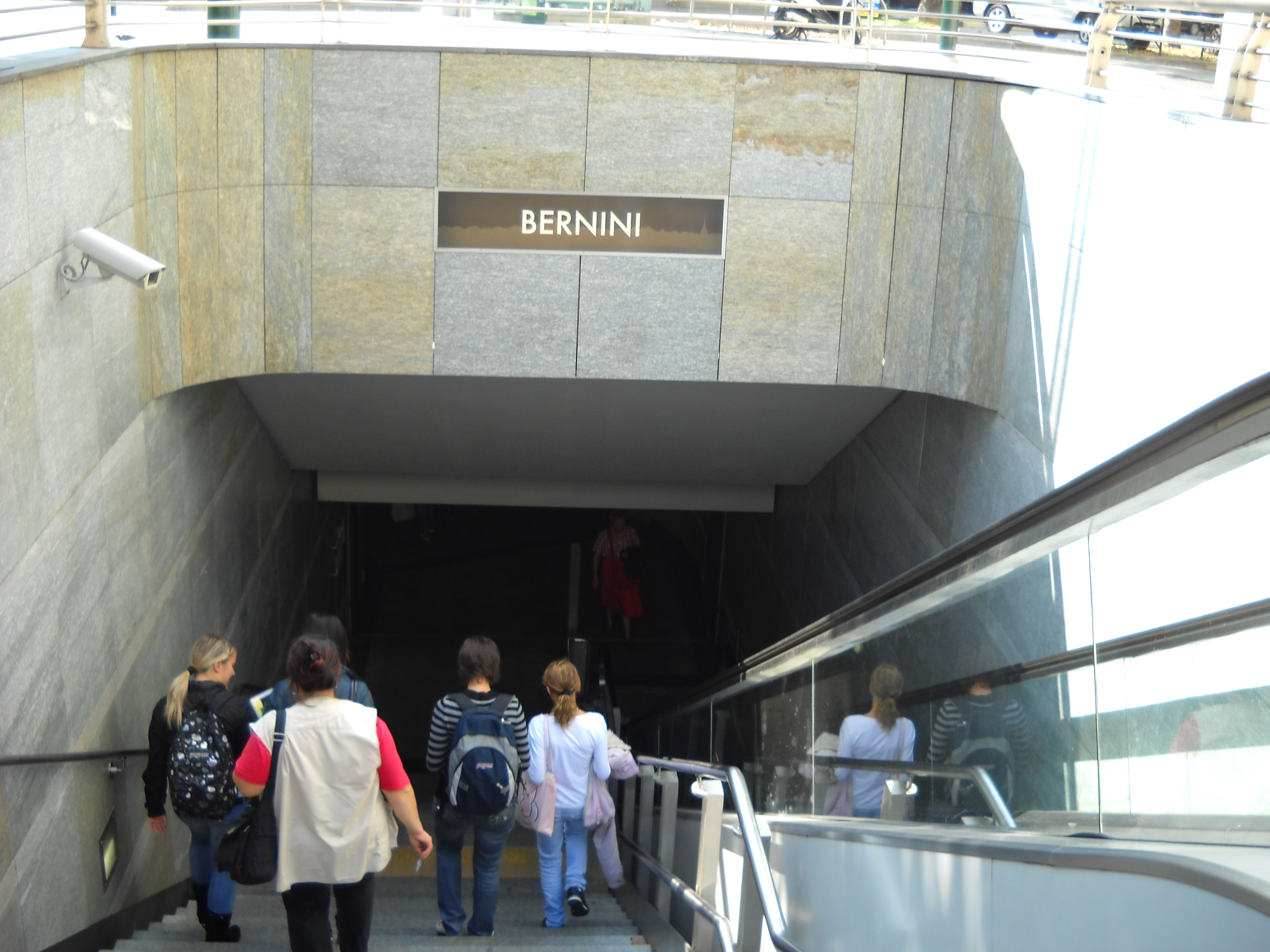

General information
- Location: Piazza Bernini, Turin
- Coordinates: 45°04′33″N 7°39′21″E
- Owner: GTT
- Platforms: 2
- Tracks: 2

Construction
- Structure type: Underground
- Accessible: Yes

History
- Opened: 4 February 2006

Services
Preceding station	Turin Metro	Following station
Racconigi towards Fermi	Line 1	Principi d'Acaja towards Bengasi
Location

Bernini is a Turin Metro station, located in Piazza Gian Lorenzo Bernini near the intersection between Corso Francia, Corso Alessandro Tassoni and Corso Francesco Ferrucci. The station was opened on 4 February 2006 as part of the inaugural section of Turin Metro, between Fermi and XVIII Dicembre.

The platforms feature decals by Ugo Nespolo, depicting works by Gian Lorenzo Bernini, Carignano Palace and Sindone Chapel.

== Services ==
- Ticket vending machines
- Handicap accessibility
- Elevators
- Escalators
- Active CCTV surveillance
