= Massaua (Turin Metro) =

Turin Metro station

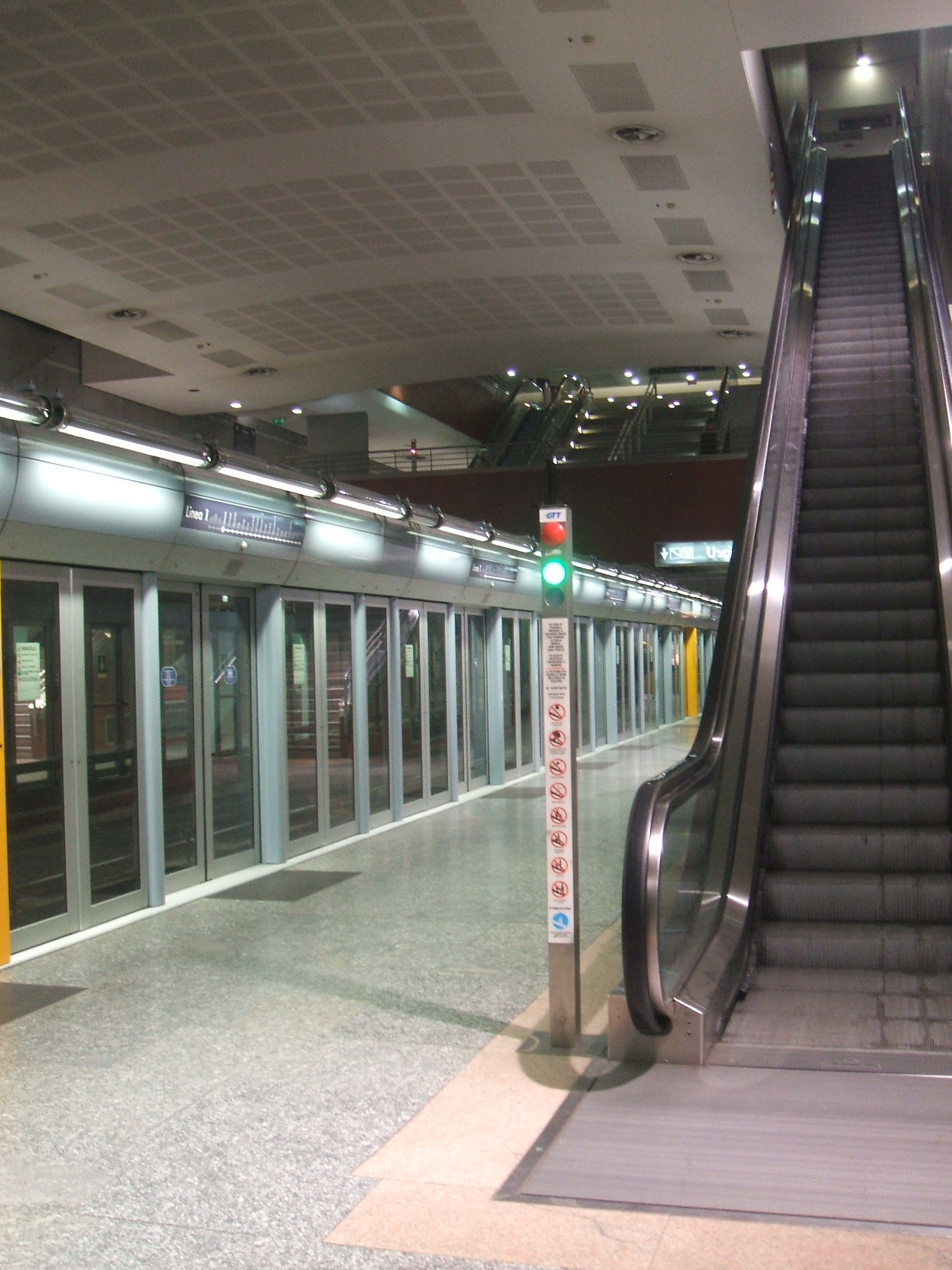

General information
- Location: Piazza Massaua, Turin
- Coordinates: 45°04′28″N 7°37′13″E
- Owner: GTT
- Platforms: 2
- Tracks: 2

Construction
- Structure type: Underground
- Accessible: Yes

History
- Opened: 4 February 2006

Services
Preceding station	Turin Metro	Following station
Marche towards Fermi	Line 1	Pozzo Strada towards Bengasi
Location

Massaua is a Turin Metro station, located in Piazza Massaua, near the intersection between Corso Francia, Via Francesco De Sanctis and Via Pietro Cossa. The station was opened on 4 February 2006 as part of the inaugural section of Turin Metro, between Fermi and XVIII Dicembre.

The platforms feature decals by Ugo Nespolo depicting the nowadays closed "Venchi" factory once located in this area.

== Services ==
- Ticket vending machines
- Handicap accessibility
- Elevators
- Escalators
- Active CCTV surveillance
