= Pozzo Strada (Turin Metro) =

Turin Metro station

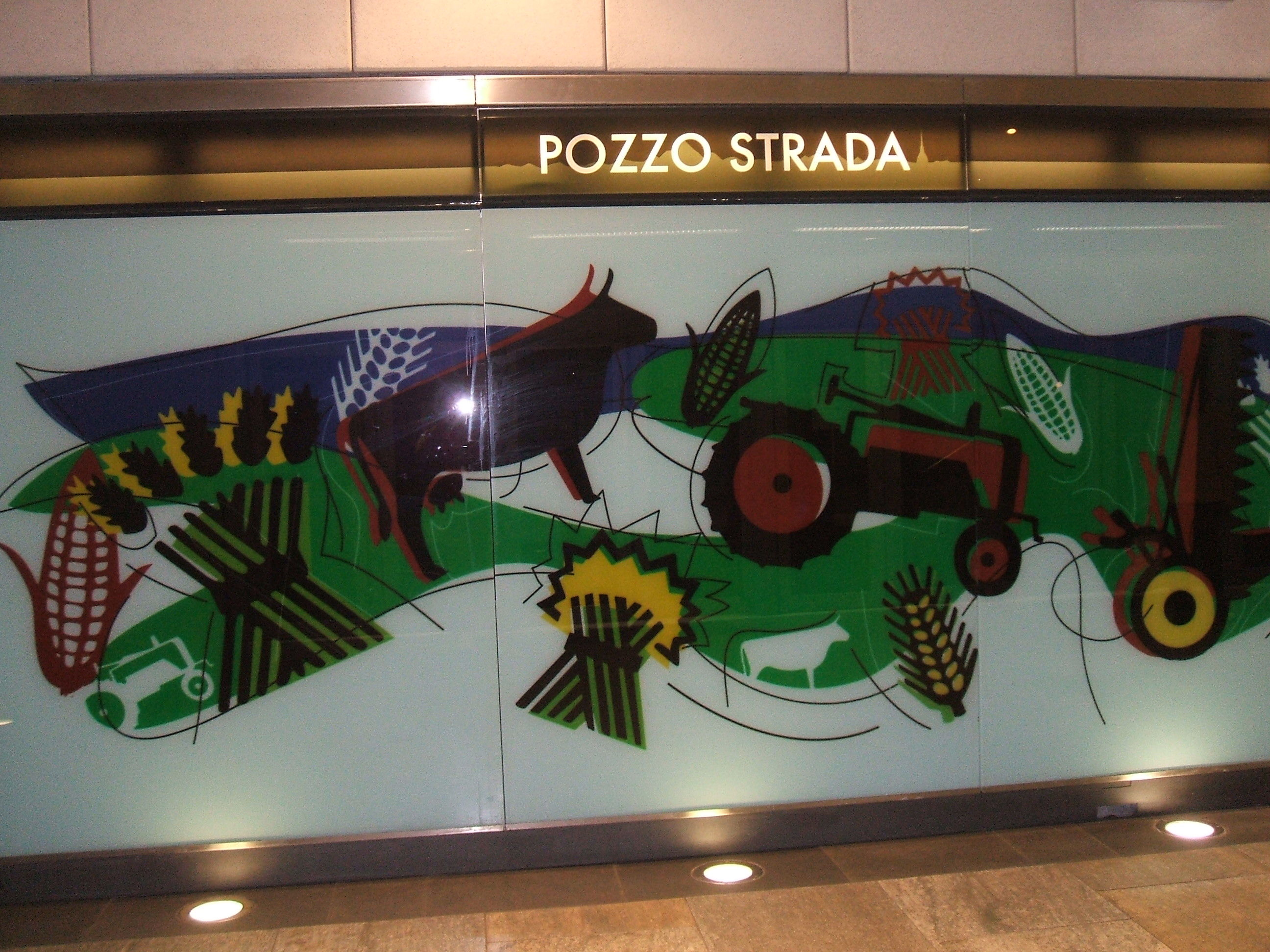

General information
- Location: Corso Francia, Turin
- Coordinates: 45°04′30″N 7°37′44″E
- Owner: GTT
- Platforms: 2
- Tracks: 2

Construction
- Structure type: Underground
- Accessible: Yes

History
- Opened: 4 February 2006

Services
Preceding station	Turin Metro	Following station
Massaua towards Fermi	Line 1	Monte Grappa towards Bengasi
Location

Pozzo Strada is a Turin Metro station, located in Corso Francia near Via Pozzo Strada and Via Gianfrancesco Re. The station was opened on 4 February 2006 as part of the inaugural section of Turin Metro, between Fermi and XVIII Dicembre.

The platforms feature decals by Ugo Nespolo.

== Services ==
- Ticket vending machines
- Handicap accessibility
- Elevators
- Escalators
- Active CCTV surveillance
