= Principi d'Acaja (Turin Metro) =

Turin Metro station

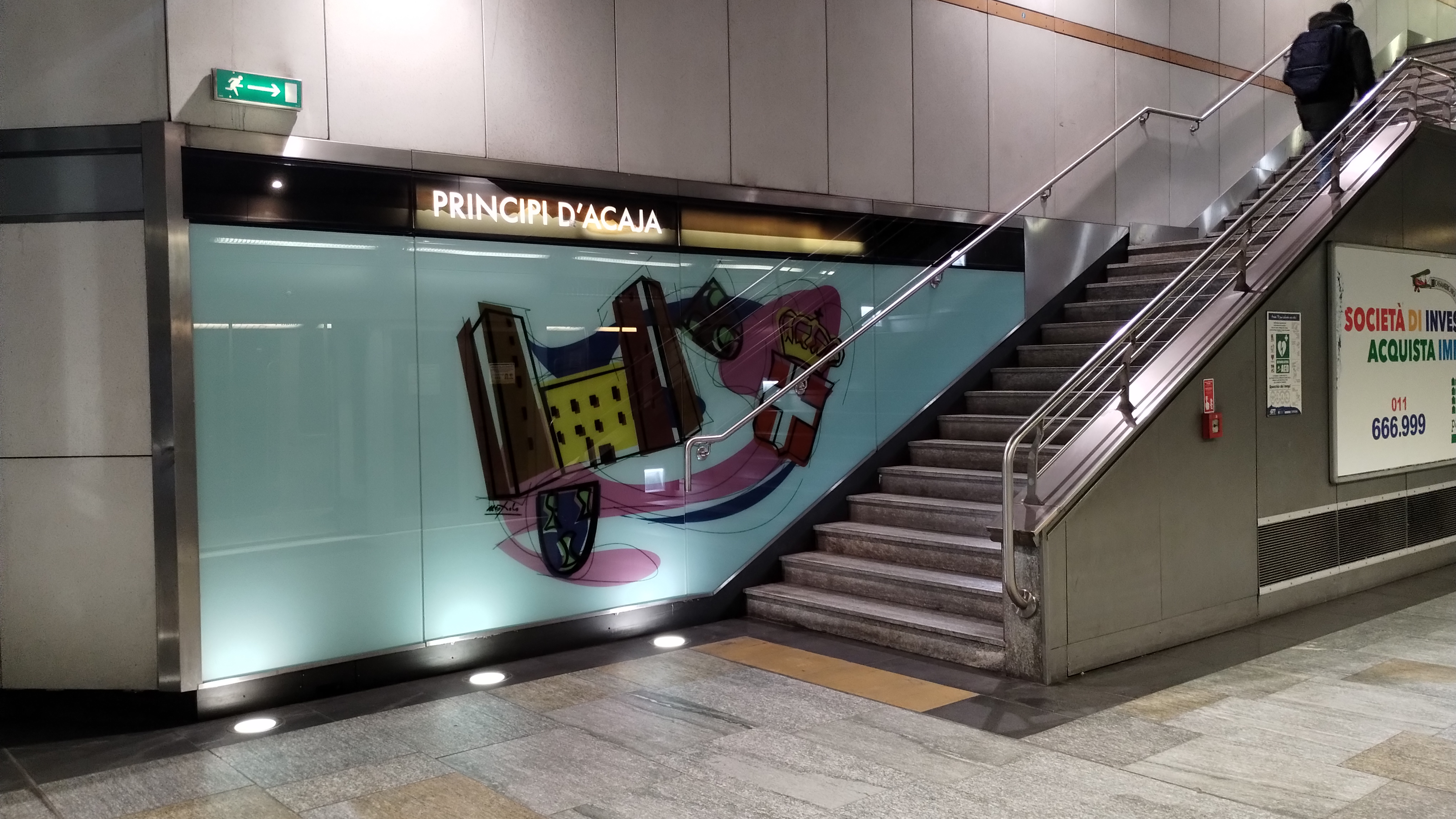

General information
- Location: Corso Francia, Turin
- Coordinates: 45°04′35″N 7°39′52″E
- Owner: GTT
- Platforms: 2
- Tracks: 2

Construction
- Structure type: Underground
- Accessible: Yes

History
- Opened: 4 February 2006

Services
Preceding station	Turin Metro	Following station
Bernini towards Fermi	Line 1	XVIII Dicembre towards Bengasi
Location

Principi d'Acaja is a Turin Metro station, located in Corso Francia near Via Principi d'Acaja. The station was opened on 4 February 2006 as part of the inaugural section of Turin Metro, between Fermi and XVIII Dicembre.

The platforms feature decals by Ugo Nespolo depicting various coat of arms used by the Savoia-Acaia family.

== Nearby Attractions ==
- Casa della Vittoria
- Casa Fenoglio-Lafleur
- Villino Raby

== Services ==
- Ticket vending machines
- Handicap accessibility
- Elevators
- Escalators
- Active CCTV surveillance
