= Paradiso (Turin Metro) =

Turin Metro station

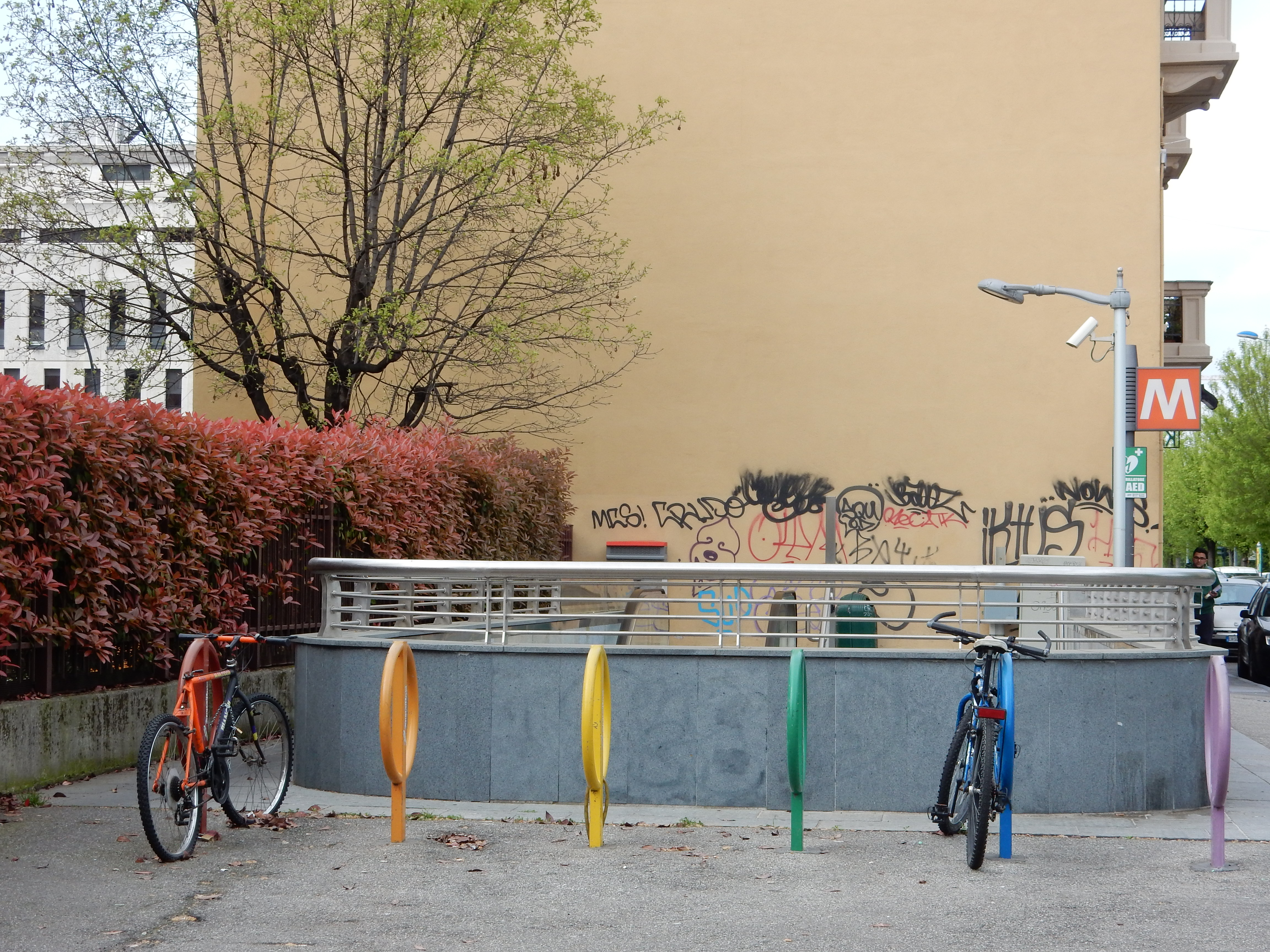
- Entrance to the station

General information
- Location: Corso Francia, Collegno
- Coordinates: 45°04′26″N 7°36′07″E
- Owner: GTT
- Platforms: 2
- Tracks: 2

Construction
- Structure type: Underground
- Accessible: Yes

History
- Opened: 4 February 2006

Services
Preceding station	Turin Metro	Following station
Fermi Terminus	Line 1	Marche towards Bengasi
Location

Paradiso is a Turin Metro station, located in the suburb named Borgata Paradiso, along Corso Francia near Via Podgora. It is the first station in Collegno territory. The station was opened on 4 February 2006 as part of the inaugural section of Turin Metro, between Fermi and XVIII Dicembre.

== History ==
It was part of the first section of the line, opened in 2006. The platforms feature decals by Ugo Nespolo depicting distinctive items related to Turin industries.

== Services ==
- Ticket vending machines
- Handicap accessibility
- Elevators
- Escalators
- Active CCTV surveillance
