= Rivoli (Turin Metro) =

Turin Metro station

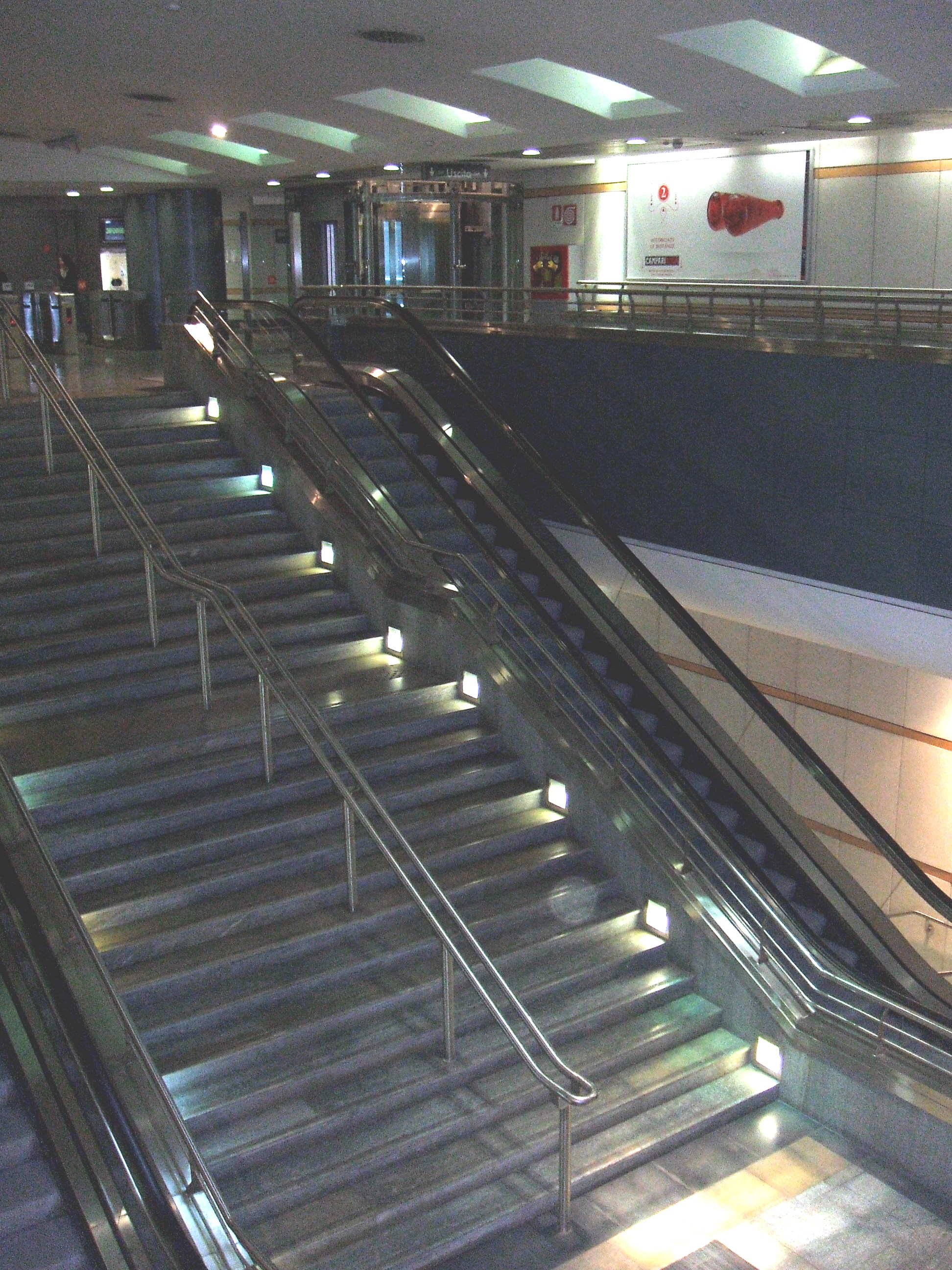

General information
- Location: Piazza Rivoli, Turin
- Coordinates: 45°04′32″N 7°38′40″E
- Owner: GTT
- Platforms: 2
- Tracks: 2

Construction
- Structure type: Underground
- Accessible: Yes

History
- Opened: 4 February 2006

Services
Preceding station	Turin Metro	Following station
Monte Grappa towards Fermi	Line 1	Racconigi towards Bengasi
Location

Rivoli is a Turin Metro station, located in Corso Francia near the intersection between Piazza Rivoli and Corso Vittorio Emanuele II. The station was opened on 4 February 2006 as part of the inaugural section of Turin Metro, between Fermi and XVIII Dicembre.

== Services ==
- Ticket vending machines
- Handicap accessibility
- Elevators
- Escalators
- Active CCTV surveillance
