= Paradiso railway station =

Paradiso railway station may refer to:

- Paradiso railway station (Luxembourg), a railway station in Luxembourg serving Wiltz International Scout Centre
- Paradiso railway station (Switzerland), a railway station serving Paradiso in the Swiss canton of Ticino
- Paradiso (Turin Metro), a metro station serving Collegno, in the Italian region of Piedmont
