= Wilwerwiltz =

Village and former commune in Luxembourg

Coordinates: 49.59°N 5.60°E

Wilwerwiltz Wëlwerwolz
- Former commune of Luxembourg
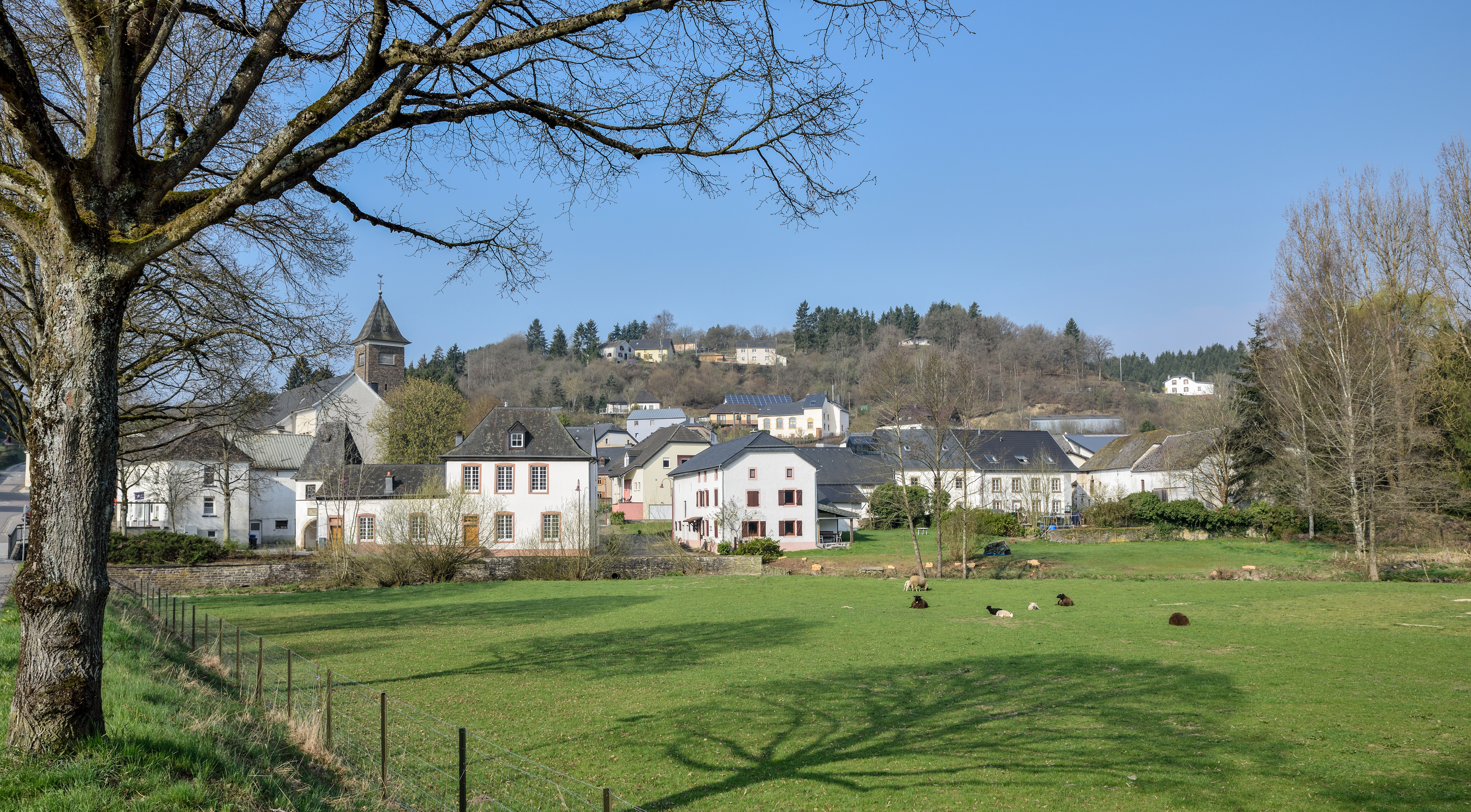

- Map of Luxembourg with Wilwerwiltz highlighted in orange, and the canton in dark red
- Country: Luxembourg
- District: Diekirch
- Canton: Wiltz
- Created: Original commune
- Abolished: 1 January 2006
- Currently: Part of Kiischpelt

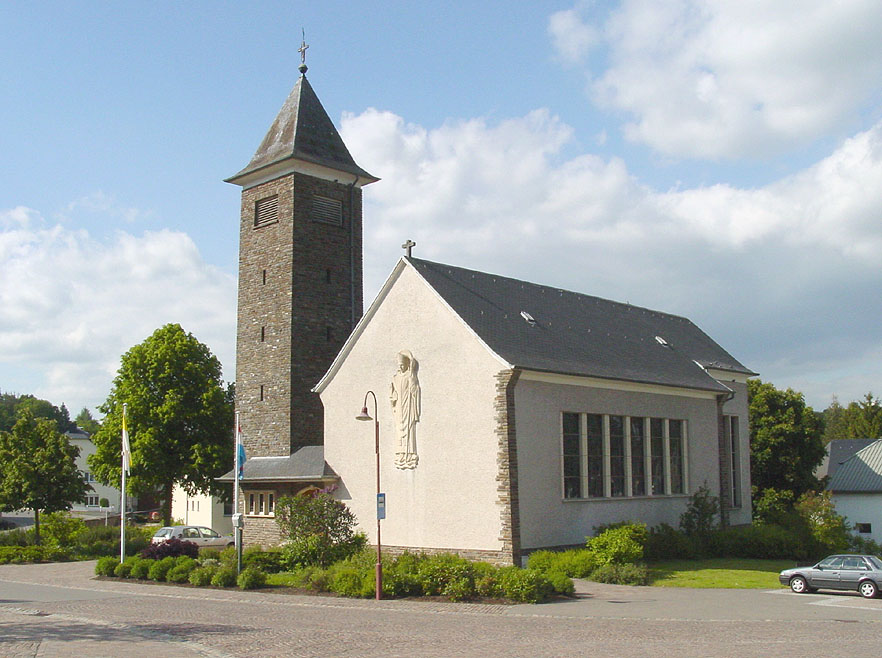
The church in the centre of Wilwerwiltz

Wilwerwiltz (German pronunciation: [ˈvɪlvɐˌvɪlts]; Luxembourgish: Wëlwerwolz) is a village in the commune of Kiischpelt, in northern Luxembourg. As of September 2026, the village has a population of 298.

Wilwerwiltz was a commune in the canton of Wiltz until 1 January 2006, when it was merged with the commune of Kautenbach to form the new commune of Kiischpelt. The law creating Kiischpelt was passed on 14 July 2005.

It is served by Wilwerwiltz railway station.

== Location ==
Wilwerwiltz lies in the Klerf valley and is the administrative center of the municipality of Kiischpelt. The train station located in the village is on the Luxembourg–Spa railway line.

== Former commune ==
The former commune consisted of the villages:

- Enscherange
- Lellingen
- Pintsch
- Wilwerwiltz
