= Merkholtz railway station =

Railway station in Luxembourg

Merkholtz Mäerkels
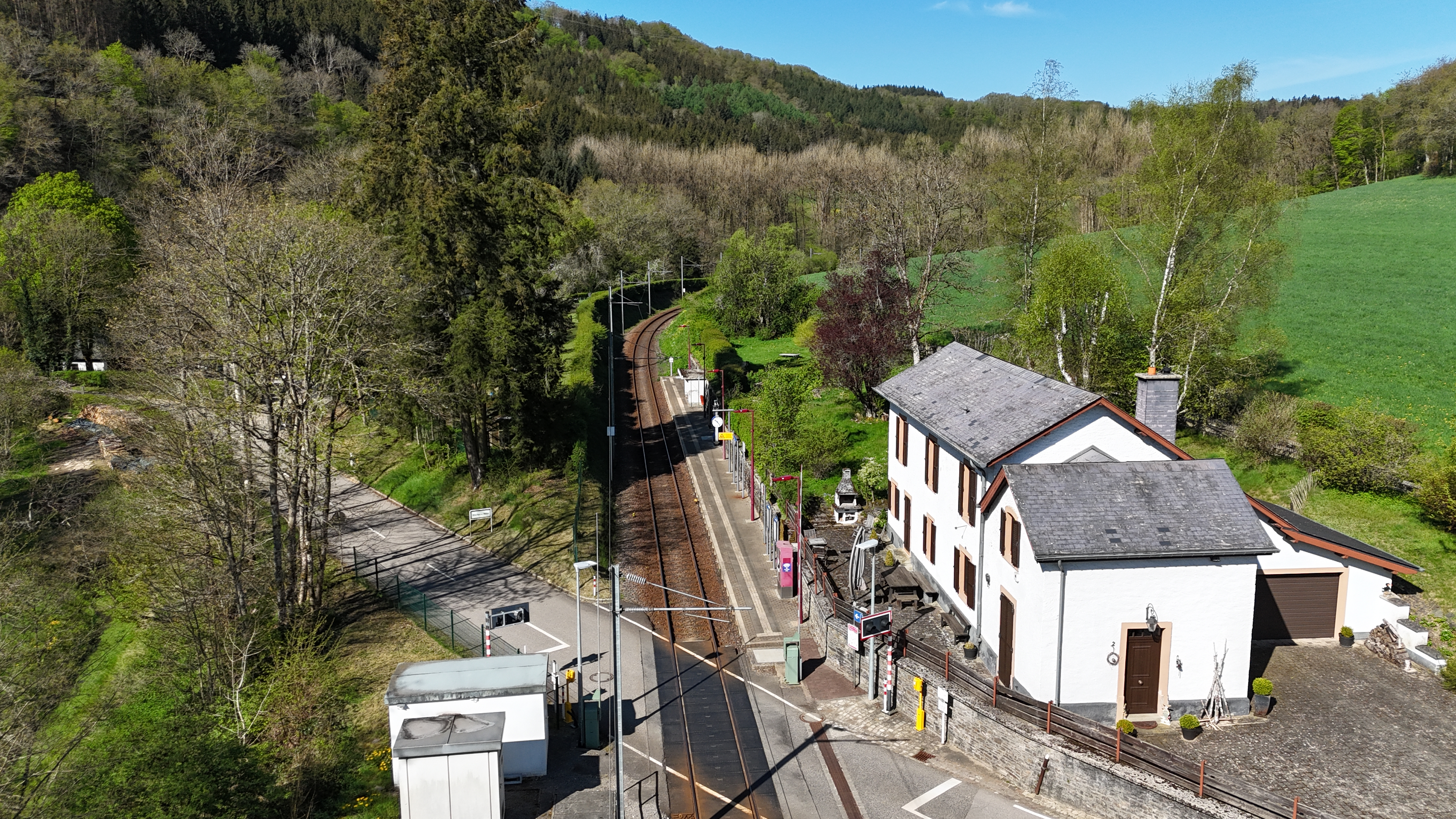
- View of Merkholtz station (2025)

General information
- Location: Rue de la Gare; Merkholtz, Luxembourg
- Coordinates: 49°57′23″N 05°58′54″E
- Owner: Chemins de Fer Luxembourgeois
- Line: CFL Line 10
- Platforms: At-grade
- Tracks: 1

Construction
- Structure type: At-grade
- Parking: yes
- Cycle facilities: yes
- Accessible: yes

Other information
- Website: CFL

History
- Opened: 1 June 1881

Passengers
- 2022: 6,253
- Rank: 58 of 60

Services
Preceding station	CFL	Following station
Kautenbach Terminus	Line 10	Paradiso towards Wiltz
Location

Merkholtz railway station (Luxembourgish: Gare Mäerkels, French: Gare de Merkholtz, German: Bahnhof Merkholtz) is a railway station serving Merkholtz, in the commune of Kiischpelt, in northern Luxembourg. It is operated by Chemins de Fer Luxembourgeois, the state-owned railway company.

== Service ==
The station is situated on a branch of Line 10, which connects Luxembourg City to the centre and north of the country. Merkholtz is the first station on the branch, which terminates at Wiltz.

Like Paradiso, it is unique insofar as it is an optional stop; to get off at Merkholtz, one must notify the train personnel, to get on, one must stand on the platform and raise a hand.

== Gallery ==
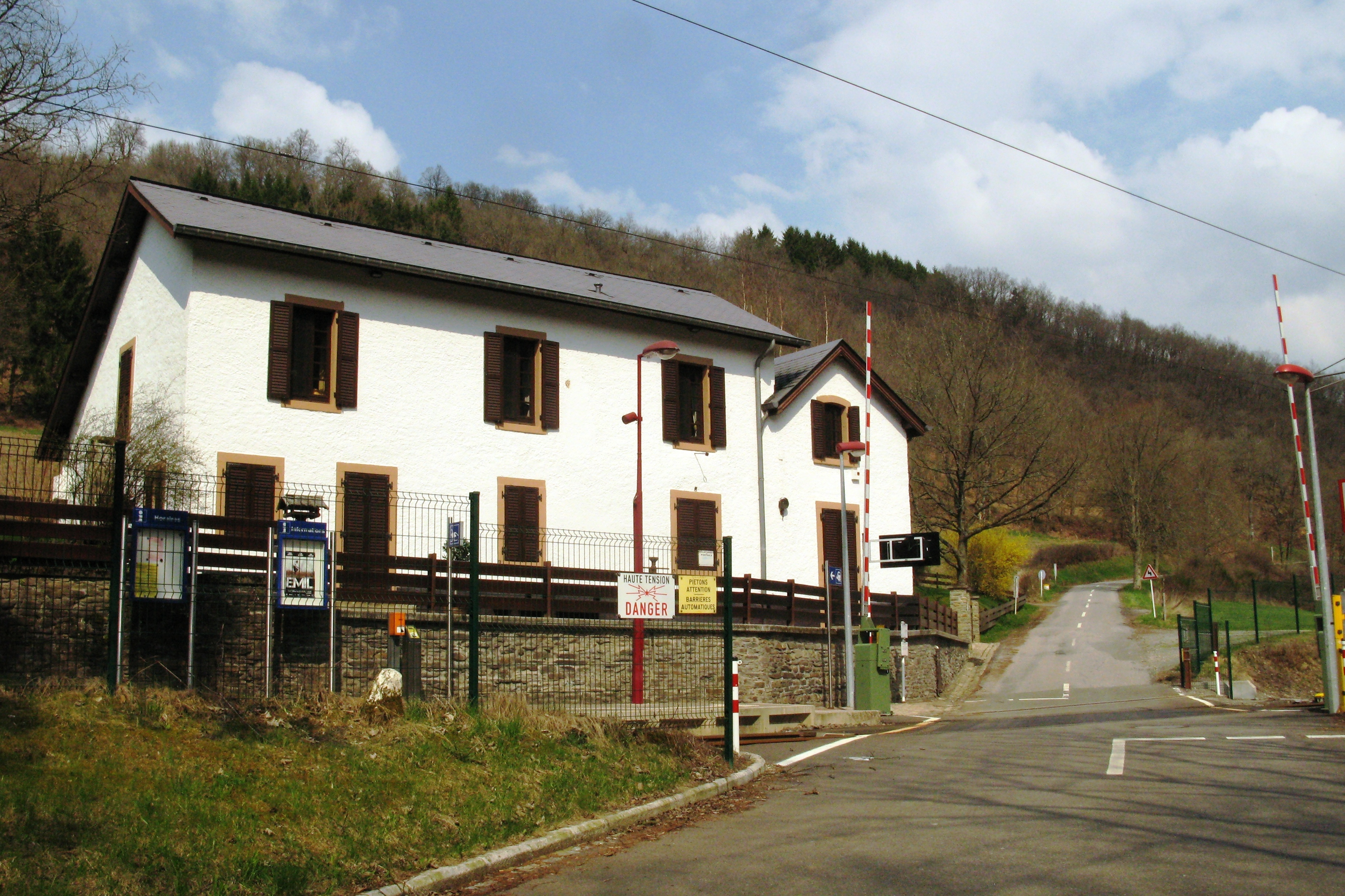
The old station facility
