= Merkholtz =

Coordinates: 49°57′41″N 5°58′50″E

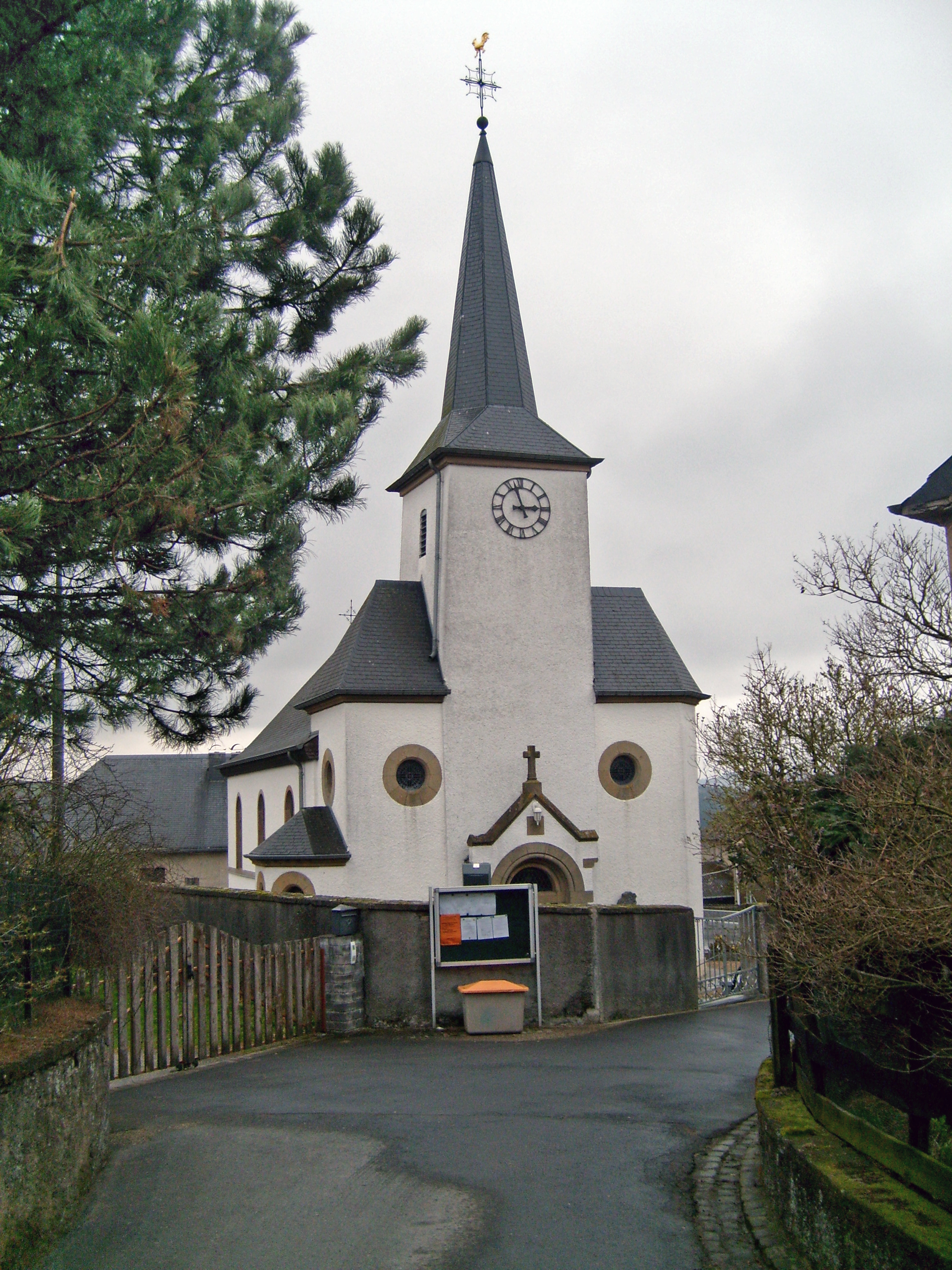
Church of Merkholtz, Luxembourg

Merkholtz (Luxembourgish: Mäerkels) is a village in the commune of Kiischpelt, in northern Luxembourg. As of September 2026, the village has a population of 119.

The town is served by Merkholtz railway station.
