= Alscheid =

Village in Luxembourg

Coordinates: 49°58′N 6°01′E

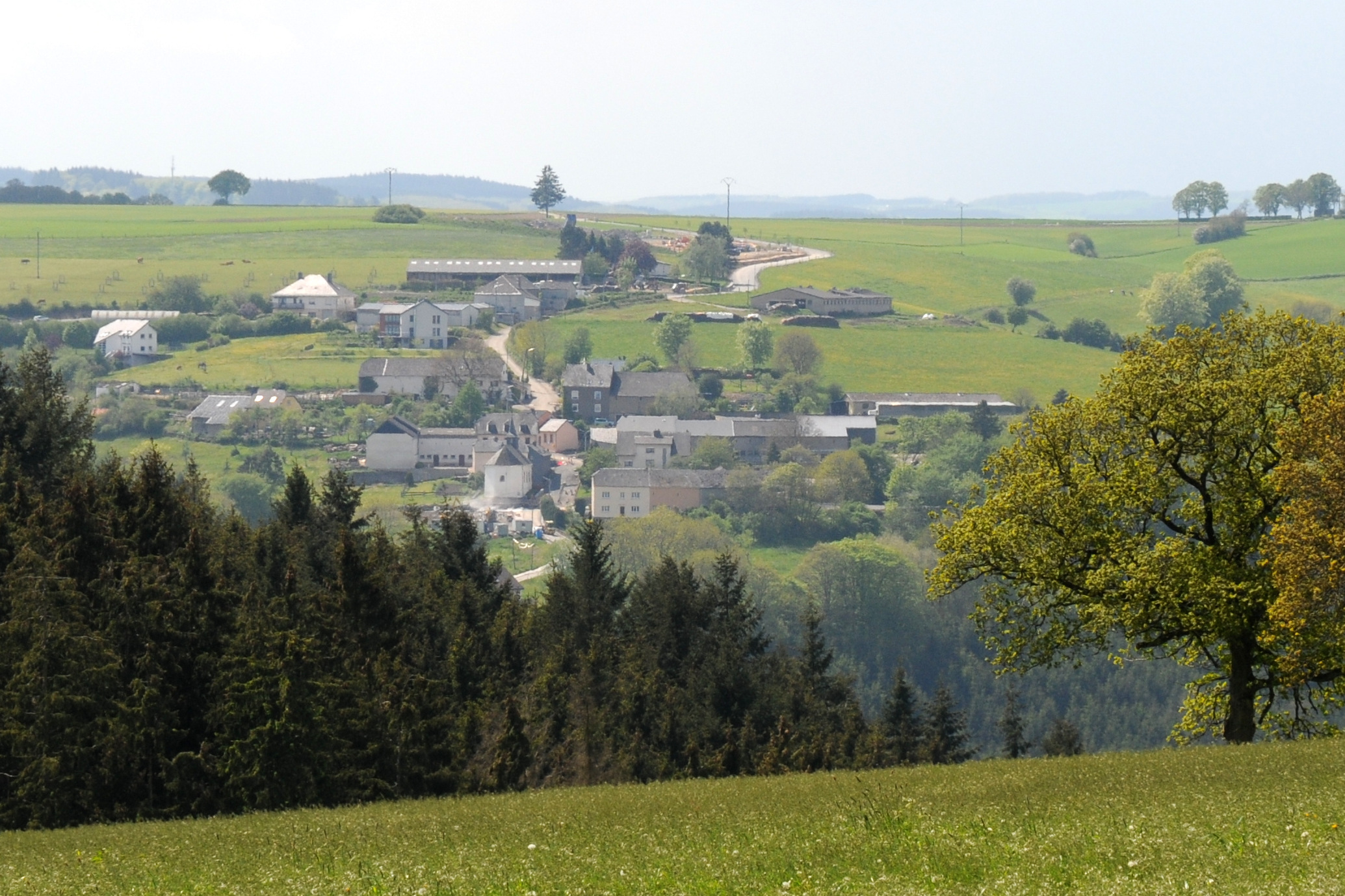
Alscheid (2012)

Alscheid (Luxembourgish: Alschent) is a village in the commune of Kiischpelt, in northern Luxembourg. As of September 2026, the village had a population of 90.

Alscheid gave its name to the former commune of Kautenbach until 17 April 1914, when the commune was given the name Kautenbach, after its largest town. Kautenbach was merged with Wilwerwiltz to form Kiischpelt in 2006.

== See also ==
- List of villages in Luxembourg
