= Casa della Vittoria =

Building in Turin, Italy

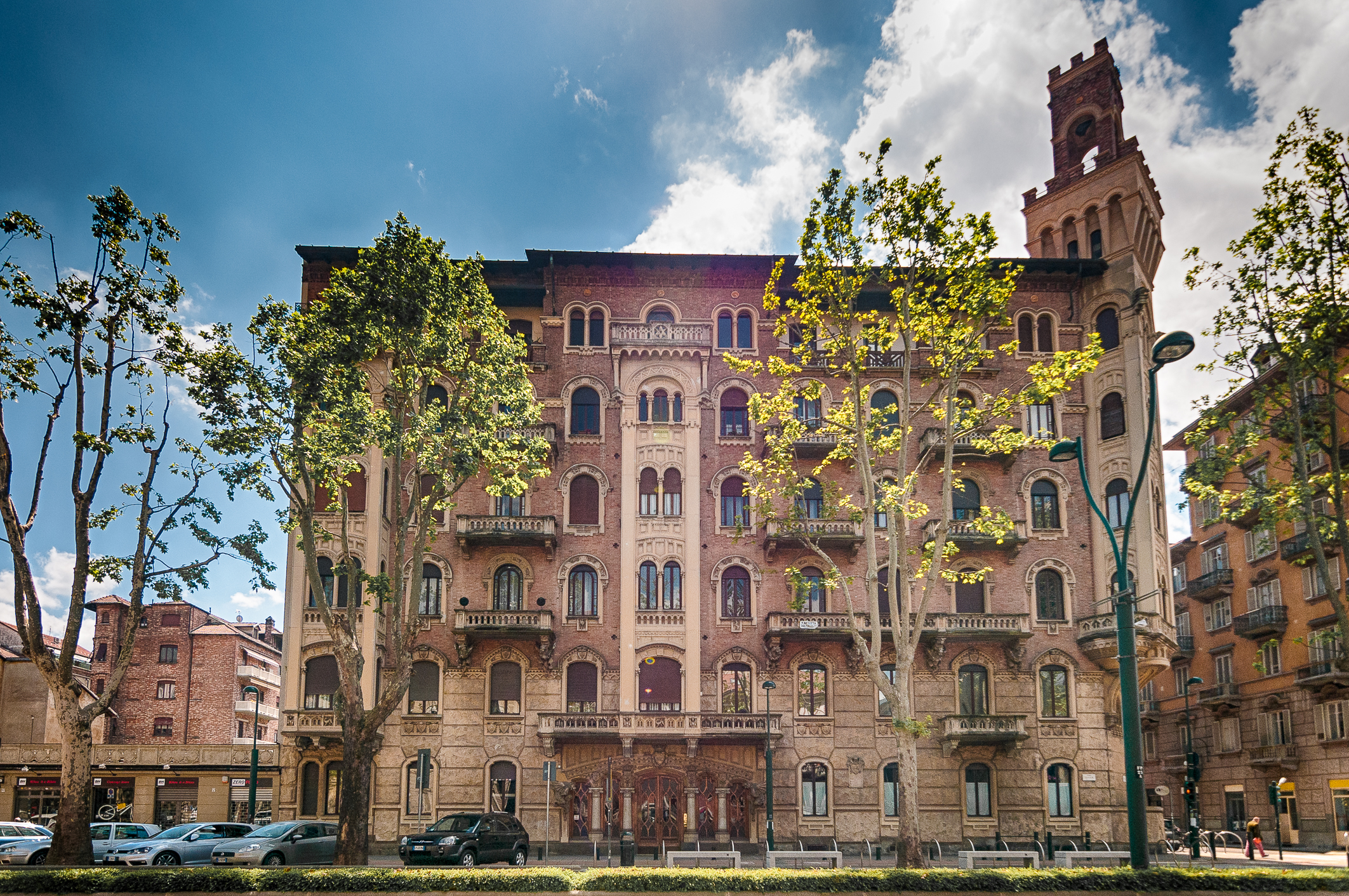
- Interactive map of Casa della Vittoria

General information
- Type: Apartments
- Architectural style: Medieval Revival
- Location: Corso Francia, 23; Turin, Piedmont; Italy
- Coordinates: 45°04′33″N 7°39′41″E
- Completed: 1920

Design and construction
- Architect: Gottardo Gussoni

The Casa della Vittoria (also known as the Casa del Carrera or Casa dei Draghi or the Palazzo della Vittoria) is a building northwest of the city center of Turin, Piedmont, Italy, considered one of the most interesting examples of residential architecture in a Medieval-revival style in the Piedmontese capital. Located in the district Cit Turin, the Casa della Vittoria is at the center of an area of great architectural interest that contains a high density of Art Nouveau and Gothic Revival buildings, including also the nearby church of San Donato.

== Background ==
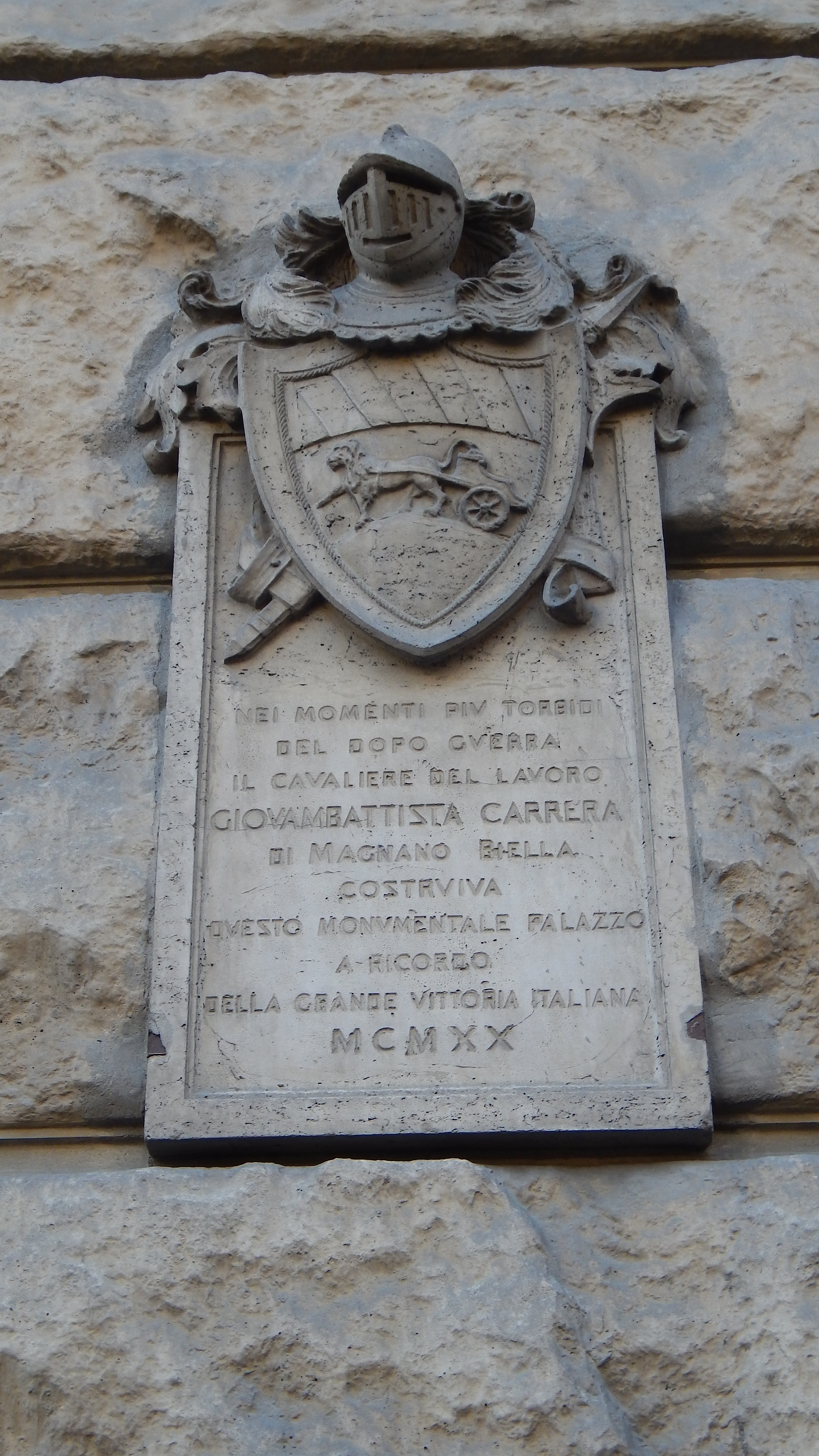
The inscription on the façade with the coat of arms of the Carrera family

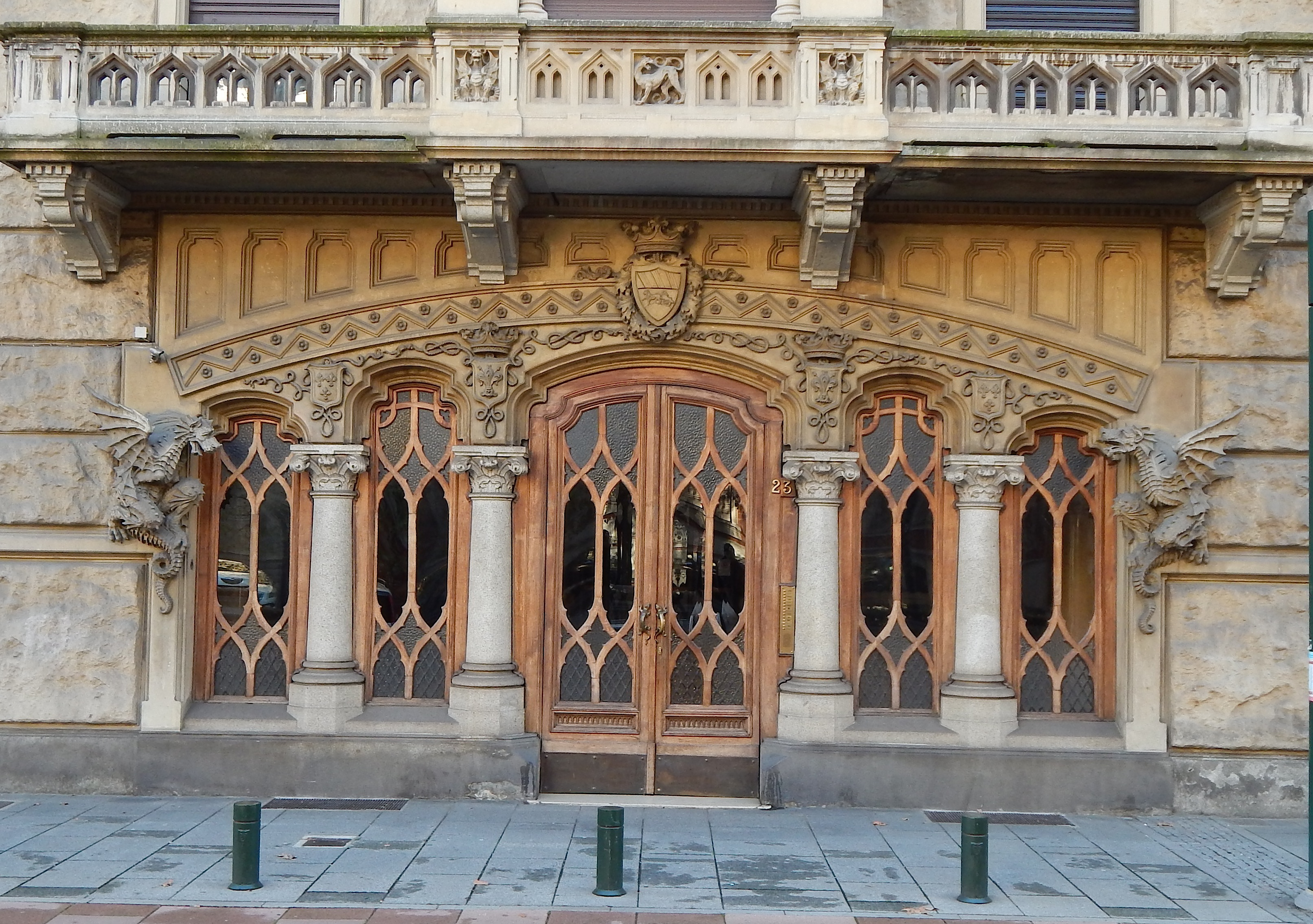
The entrance portal surmounted by the coat of arms of the Carrera family

During the late nineteenth and early twentieth centuries the residential area of Cit Turin was the epicenter of an intense amount of building activity predominantly characterized by the Liberty Style (Italian Art Nouveau). Parallel to the naturalism of this style was the development of the Gothic Revival, which infiltrated the district by its use in several important buildings. In addition to the church of Gesù Nazareno, the examples of its presence in the neighborhood are the home of the cavalier Carrera di Magnano (Biella) and the Casa della Vittoria. Commissioned in 1918 by Giovanni Battista Carrera from the engineer Gottardo Gussoni to celebrate the Italian victory in the First World War, it was completed in 1920, representing a sign of recovery of the post-war construction sector, a statement confirmed on the plaque placed on the facade. The building is located not far away on the Corso Francia from the famed houses known as the Casa Fenoglio-Lafleur and Villino Raby.

== Description ==
The building as developed rises six stories from the street and fronts the Corso Francia, the major boulevard running through the neighborhood of Cit Turin. Its eclectic medievalist style is marked by the incursions of the French strain of Gothic Revival, which can be found in the structural details such as the portal and the entrance hall, the balustrades of the balconies and internal staircases and the pronounced angular oriel characterized by its mullioned windows and round three-light windows that culminate in a crenellated turret.

Of great importance is the complex decorative apparatus of the main façades characterized by the extensive use of elements in cement, allegorical and zoomorphic decorations, including the pair of large dragons flanking the large wooden entrance portal; it is precisely the presence of these decorative elements that, over the years, has earned it the name of "House of Dragons" ("Casa dei Draghi"). The decoration begins at the base of the main façades, simulating a stone ashlar with horizontal bands extending up to the main floor. At this level the windows are enriched by a frame which at the base bears coats of arms depicting allegorical figures that mark the façade, alternating with the pairs of dragons, symbolic representations of power and prestige that support the balustrades of the balconies on the upper floor. The remaining arched windows show simpler frames, while the two large central bay windows have round mullioned windows and also culminate with a terrace.

The building has a beveled corner containing and a niche at the angle of the Corso Francia with the street intersecting it: the niche seems to have been conceived to house a statue which, however, has never been placed there.

== In popular culture ==
The Casa della Vittoria has been featured in at least four films set in Turin. They include:

- Profumo di donna (1974) (dir. Dino Risi)
- Ti piace Hitchcock? (2004) (dir. Dario Argento)
- La maschera etrusca (2007) (dir. Ted Nicolaou)
- Il divo (2008) (dir. Paolo Sorrentino)

== Transportation access ==
The Casa della Vittoria can be reached from the M1 line (Fermi - Lingotto) of Metropolitana at the station Principi d'Acaja.

== Bibliography ==
- Abrate, Mario. Torino, città viva: da capitale a metropoli, 1880-1980 : cento anni di vita cittadina, politica, economia, società, cultura. vol. 1. Turin: Centro Studi Piemontesi, 1980. 317.

== See also ==
- Timeline of Italian architecture
- Outline of Turin
- Gothic Revival architecture
- Bibliography of the History of Turin
