= Wilwerwiltz railway station =

Railway station in Luxembourg

Wilwerwiltz Wëlwerwolz
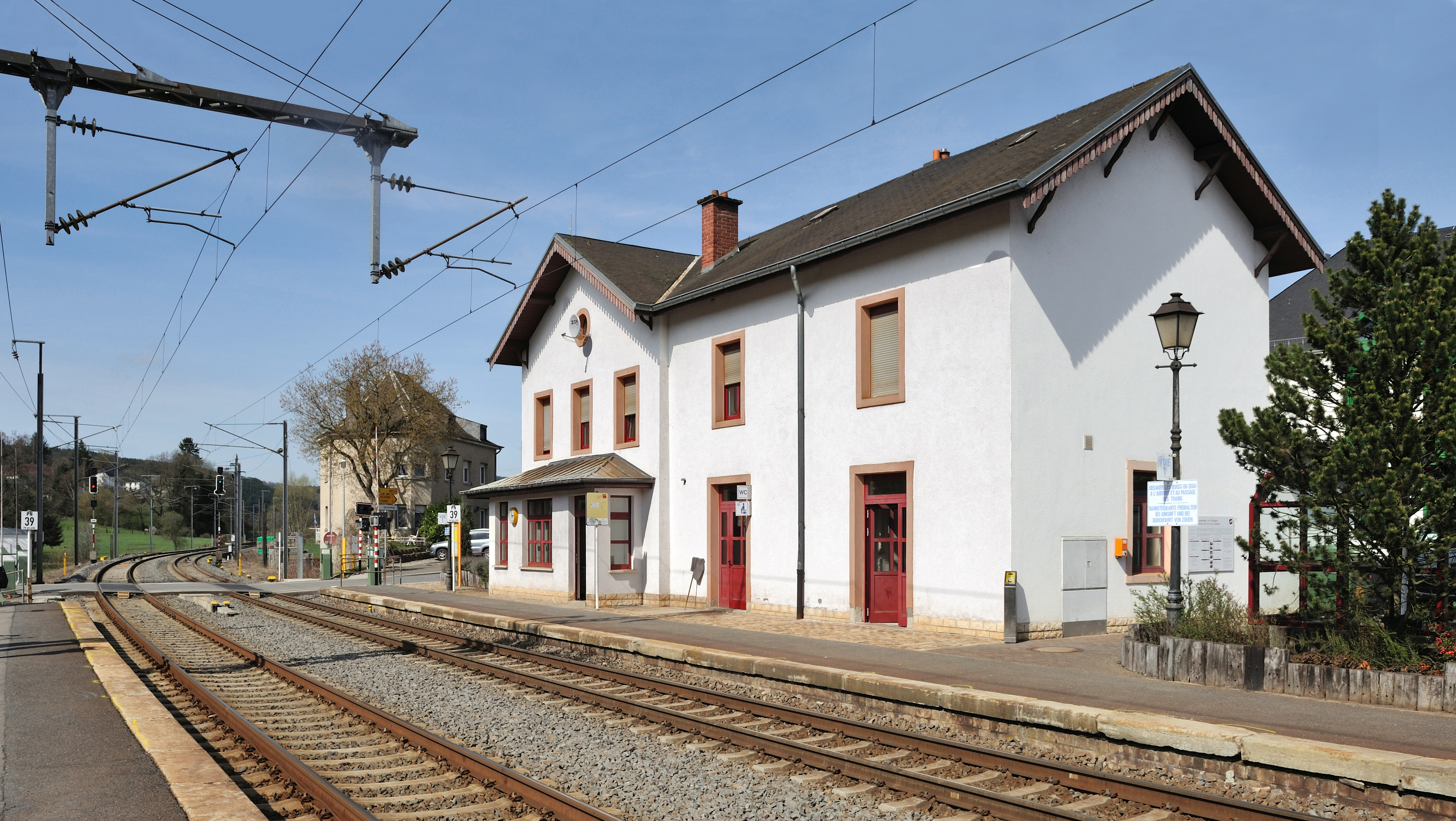

General information
- Location: Op der Gare; L-9776 Wilwerwiltz; Luxembourg
- Coordinates: 49°59′18″N 06°00′02″E
- Operator: Chemins de Fer Luxembourgeois, SNCB
- Line: CFL Line 10
- Platforms: 2
- Tracks: 2
- Connections: RGTR bus lines 143, 144, 145 and 154

Construction
- Parking: 86 parking spaces
- Cycle facilities: 16 bikebox parking spaces; 7 bicycle parking spaces

Other information
- Website: CFL

History
- Opened: 15 December 1866

Passengers
- 2022: 57,078
- Rank: 47 of 60

Services
Preceding station	CFL	Following station
Kautenbach towards Luxembourg	Line 10	Drauffelt towards Troisvierges
Preceding station	NMBS/SNCB	Following station
Kautenbach towards Luxembourg	IC 33	Drauffelt towards Liers
Location

Wilwerwiltz railway station (Luxembourgish: Gare Wëlwerwolz, French: Gare de Wilwerwiltz) is a railway station serving the village of Wilwerwiltz, in the commune of Kiischpelt, in northern Luxembourg. It is operated by Chemins de Fer Luxembourgeois, the state-owned railway company.

The station is situated on Line 10, which connects Luxembourg City to the centre and north of the country.
