= Kiischpelt =

Kiischpelt Kiischpelt
- Commune
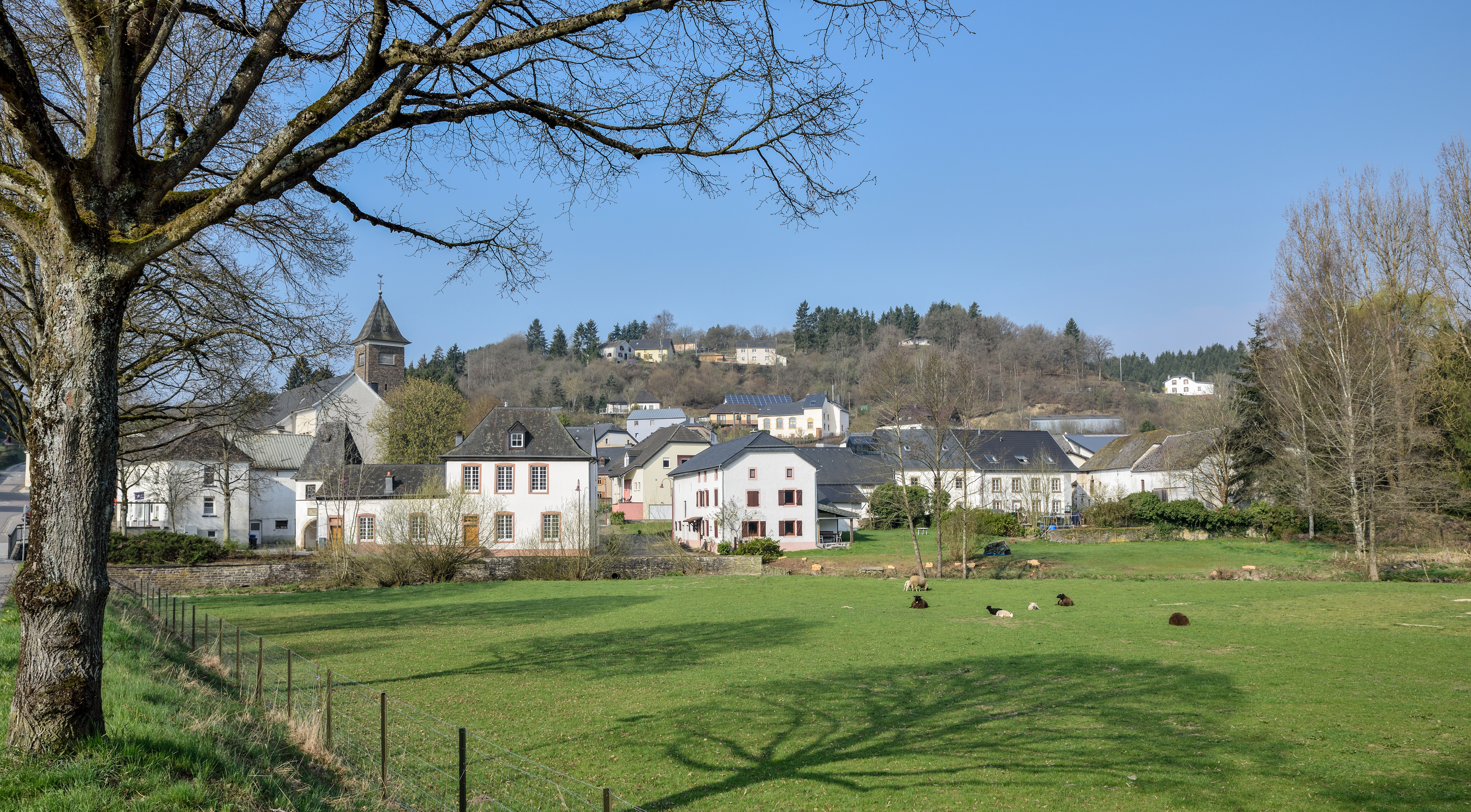
- Kautenbach Wilwerwiltz

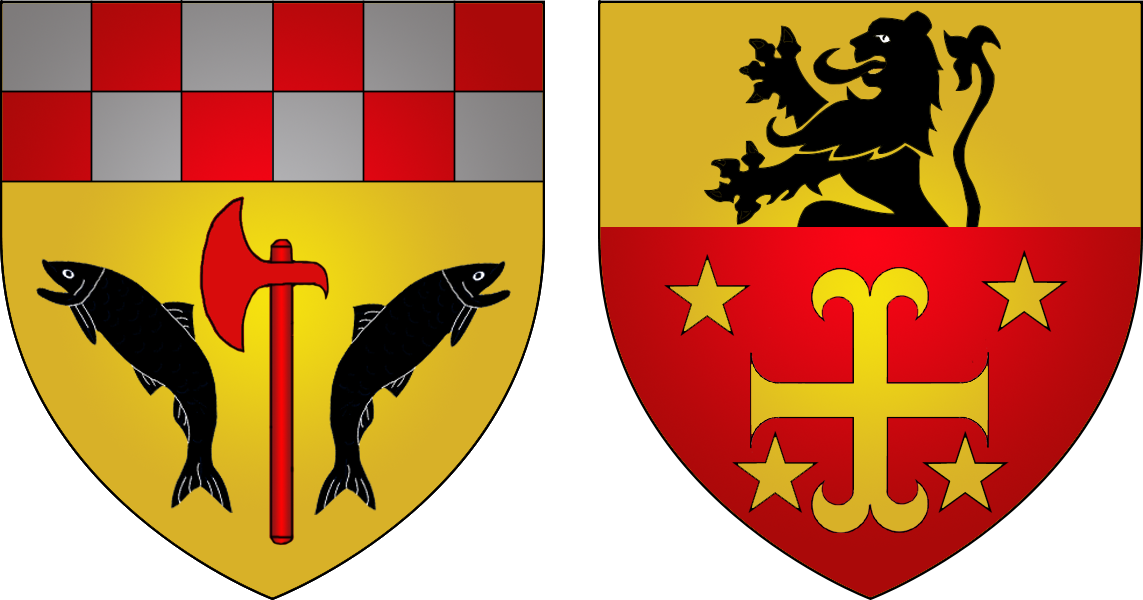
- Coat of arms

- Map of Luxembourg with Kiischpelt highlighted in orange, and the canton in dark red
- Coordinates: 49.9919°N 6.0061°E
- Country: Luxembourg
- Canton: Wiltz

Government
  - Mayor: Yves Kaiser

Area
  - Total: 33.58 km^{2} (12.97 sq mi)
  - Rank: 20th of 100
- Highest elevation: 498 m (1,634 ft)
  - Rank: 19th of 100
- Lowest elevation: 241 m (791 ft)
  - Rank: 47th of 100

Population (2026)
  - Total: 1,317
  - Rank: 98th of 100
  - Density: 39.22/km^{2} (101.6/sq mi)
  - Rank: 100th of 100
- Time zone: UTC+1 (CET)
  - Summer (DST): UTC+2 (CEST)
- LAU 2: LU0000805
- Website: kiischpelt.lu

Kiischpelt is a commune in northern Luxembourg, in the canton of Wiltz. The commune's administrative centre is Wilwerwiltz.

Kiischpelt was formed on 1 January 2006 from the former communes of Kautenbach and Wilwerwiltz, both in Wiltz canton. The law creating Kiischpelt was passed on 30 June 2005.

It is the least densely populated and third least-populous commune in Luxembourg. Despite this, Kiischpelt is served by three railway stations: Kautenbach, Wilwerwiltz and Merkholtz.

== Populated places ==
The commune consists of the following villages:

Kautenbach Section:

- Alscheid
- Kautenbach
- Merkholz
- Koenerhof (lieu-dit)
- Schuttbourg-Château (lieu-dit)
- Schuttbourg-Moulin (lieu-dit)

Wilwerwiltz Section:

- Enscherange
- Lellingen
- Pintsch
- Wilwerwiltz

== Population ==
Historical population

Year	Pop.	±%
1821	921	—
1851	1,367	+48.4%
1900	1,346	−1.5%
1910	1,305	−3.0%
1922	1,245	−4.6%
1935	1,197	−3.9%

Year	Pop.	±%
1947	1,091	−8.9%
1960	908	−16.8%
1970	745	−18.0%
1981	619	−16.9%
1990	739	+19.4%
2000	893	+20.8%

Year	Pop.	±%
2005	919	+2.9%
2010	943	+2.6%
2015	1,110	+17.7%
2020	1,214	+9.4%
2021	1,209	−0.4%

Source data
