= Wiltz railway station =

Railway station in Luxembourg

Wiltz Woltz
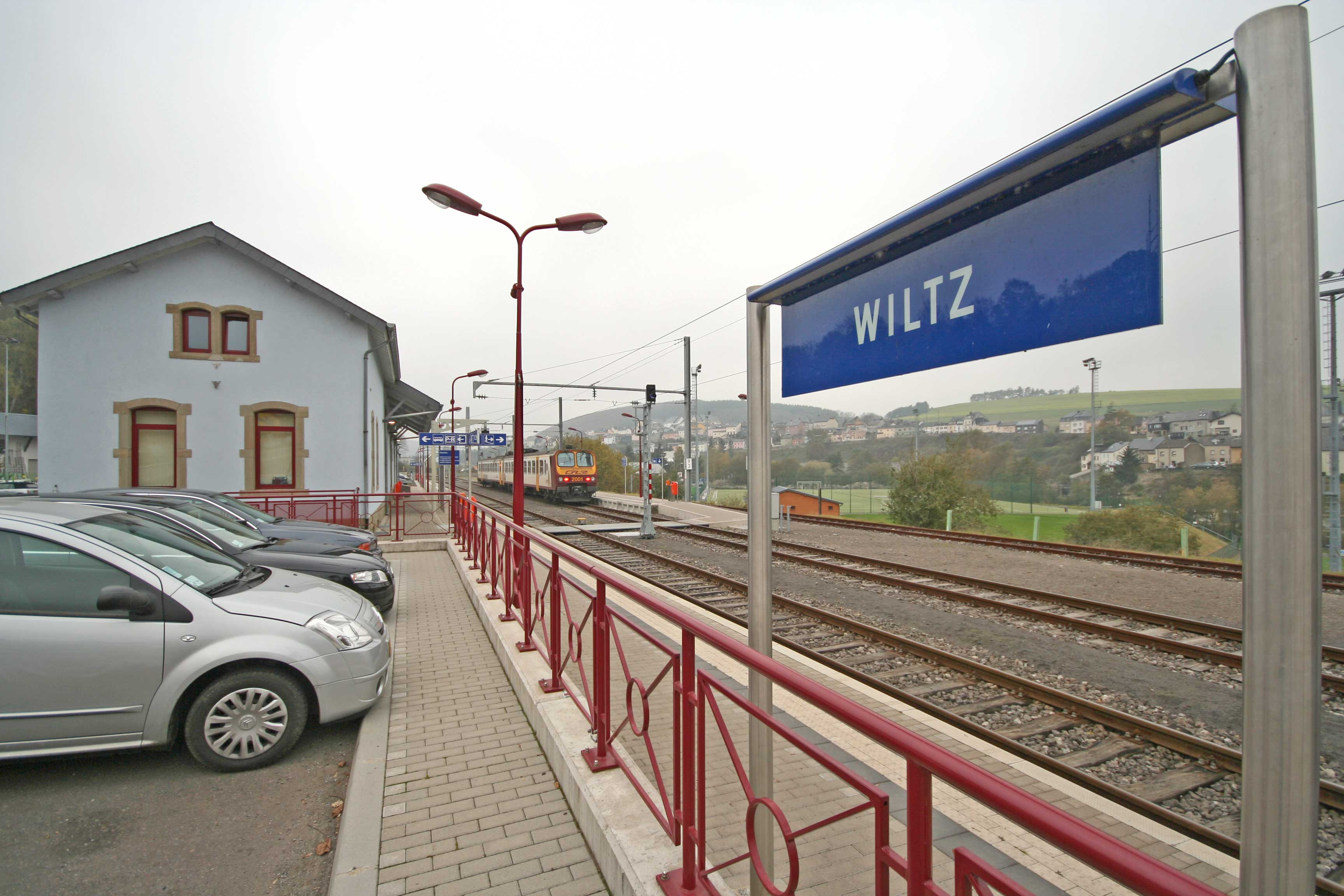
- Station building and platforms

General information
- Location: Avenue de la Gare; 9540 Wiltz
- Coordinates: 49°58′00″N 05°55′44″E
- Owner: CFL
- Line: CFL Line 10
- Platforms: 2
- Tracks: 2

Construction
- Parking: 95 parking spaces
- Cycle facilities: 7 cycle spaces; 16 mBox cycle spaces

Other information
- Website: CFL

History
- Opened: 1 June 1866

Passengers
- 2022: 255,679
- Rank: 26 of 60
Location

Wiltz railway station (Luxembourgish: Gare Wolz, French: Gare de Wiltz, German: Bahnhof Wiltz) is a railway station serving Wiltz, in north-western Luxembourg. It is operated by Chemins de Fer Luxembourgeois, the state-owned railway company.

== Service ==
The station is situated on a branch of the Line 10, which connects Luxembourg City to the centre and north of the country. It is the terminus of the branch, which splits from the main line at Kautenbach.

Preceding station	CFL	Following station
Paradiso towards Kautenbach	Line 10	Terminus
