= Kautenbach =

Village and former commune in Luxembourg

Coordinates: 49°57′N 6°01′E

Kautenbach Kautebaach
- Former commune of Luxembourg

- Map of Luxembourg with Kautenbach highlighted in orange, and the canton in dark red
- Country: Luxembourg
- District: Diekirch
- Canton: Wiltz
- Created: Original commune
- Abolished: 1 January 2006
- Currently: Part of Kiischpelt

Kautenbach (German pronunciation: [ˈkaʊtn̩ˌbax]; Luxembourgish: Kautebaach) is a village in the commune of Kiischpelt, in northern Luxembourg. As of September 2026, the village had a population of 140.

Kautenbach was a commune in the canton of Wiltz until 1 January 2006, when it was merged with the commune of Wilwerwiltz to form the new commune of Kiischpelt. The law creating Kiischpelt was passed on 30 June 2005.

Until 17 April 1914, the commune was known as Alscheid, after its former administrative centre. On that date, the administrative centre was moved from Alscheid to Kautenbach.

The ancient Schuttbourg Castle is located near the village.

== Former commune ==
The former commune consisted of the villages:

- Alscheid
- Kautenbach
- Merkholz
- Koenerhof (lieu-dit)
- Schuttbourg-Château (lieu-dit)
- Schuttbourg-Moulin (lieu-dit)
