= Paradiso railway station (Luxembourg) =

Railway station in Luxembourg

Paradiso
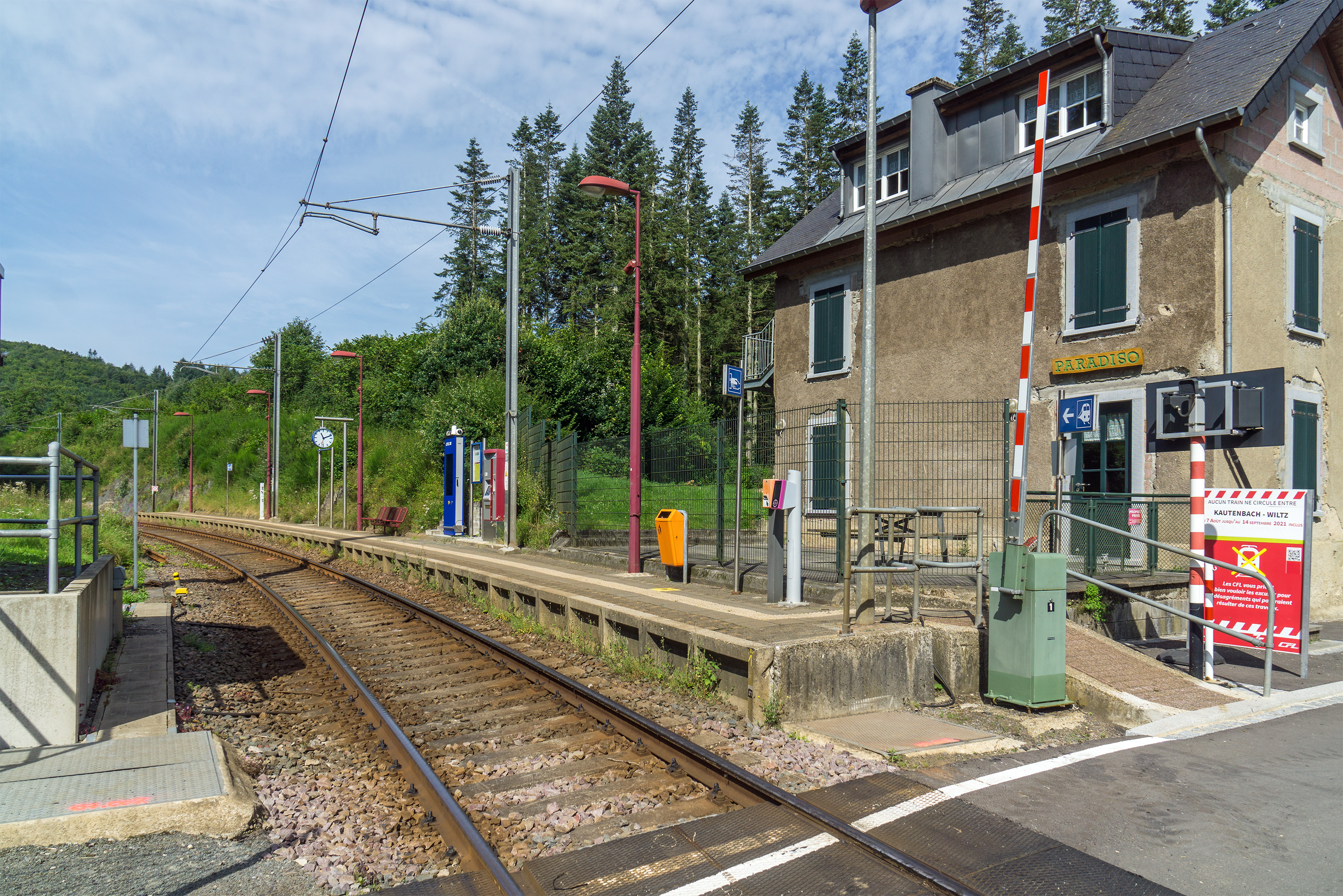

General information
- Location: Gare; 9540, Wiltz
- Coordinates: 49°57′54″N 05°57′20″E
- Owner: Chemins de Fer Luxembourgeois
- Line: CFL Line 10
- Platforms: 1
- Tracks: 1

Construction
- Accessible: yes

History
- Opened: 1997

Services
Preceding station	CFL	Following station
Merkholtz towards Kautenbach	Line 10	Wiltz Terminus
Location

Paradiso railway station (Luxembourgish: Gare Paradiso, French: Gare de Paradiso, German: Bahnhof Paradiso) is a railway station in the commune of Wiltz, in north-western Luxembourg. It is located in the countryside, isolated from the town of Wiltz, but serves several sites of the Wiltz International Scout Centre. It is operated by Chemins de Fer Luxembourgeois, the state-owned railway company.

== Service ==
The station is situated on a branch of Line 10, which connects Luxembourg City to the centre and north of the country. Paradiso is the second station on the branch, which terminates at Wiltz.
