= Casa Fenoglio-Lafleur =

Historic house in Piedmont, Italy

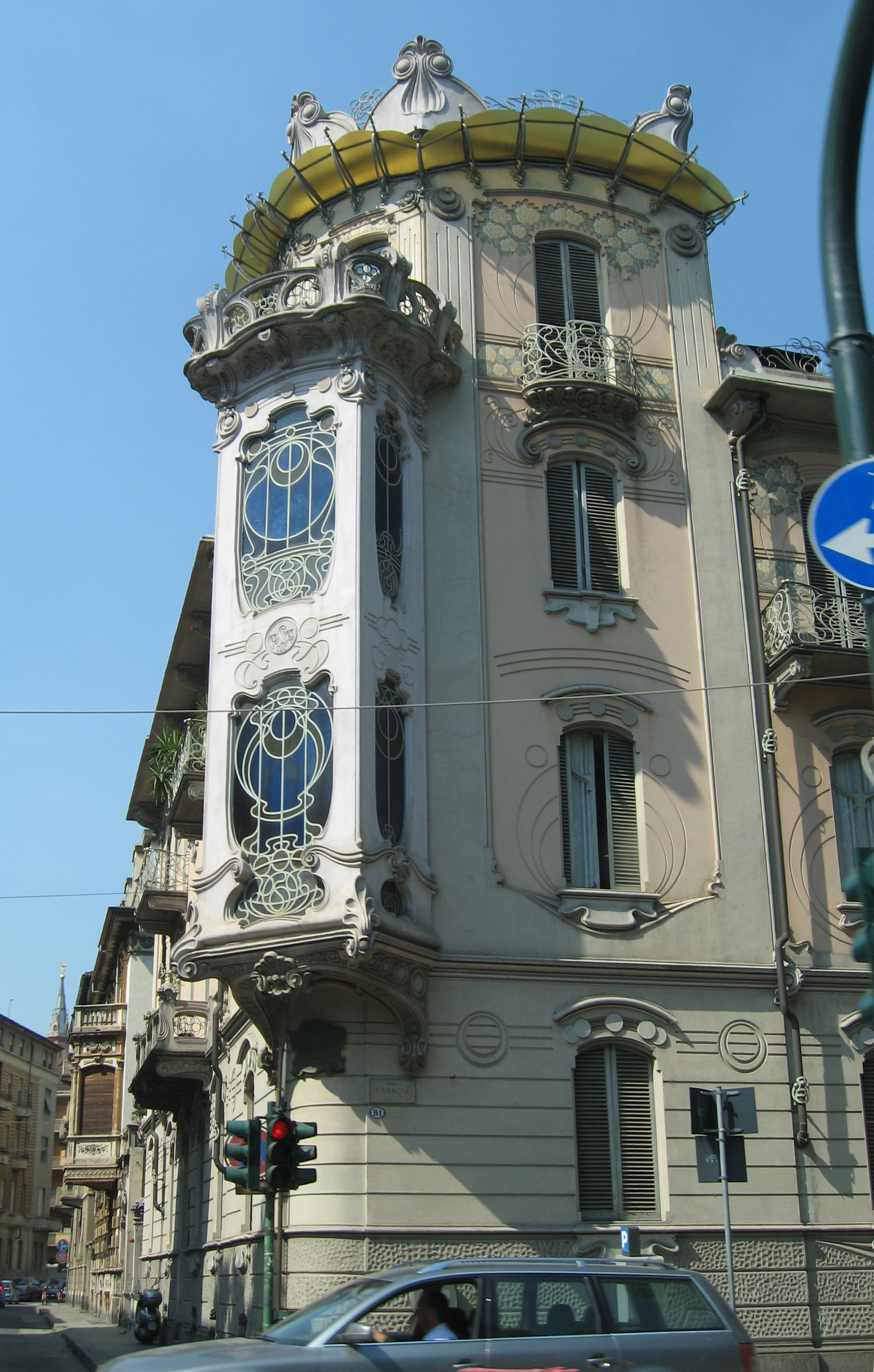
- Fenoglio-Lafleur house, Turin.

- Location within Italy

General information
- Location: Turin, Italy
- Coordinates: 45.0767°N 7.6648°E
- Completed: 1902

Height
- Architectural: Liberty style

Design and construction
- Architect: Pietro Fenoglio

Casa Fenoglio-Lafleur (or Fenoglio-Lafleur house) is a historical building in the Liberty style located in Turin, Italy.

It is situated in the San Donato borough, a central area with significant Stile Liberty buildings and New Gothic architecture in Turin. The building was designed in 1902 by building engineer Pietro Fenoglio who made it his private residence. Casa Fenoglio-Lafleur.

== History ==
Fenoglio designed the building as his home, according to the French Art Nouveau style. It was a "home-studio" which favored freedom of expression for creative talent. The building was designed to be an aesthetic model of the new Liberty style in Turin.

After it was built in the 1900s, Pietro Fenoglio and his family left the house. They sold it to a French businessman named Lafleur, who lived there until his death. After Lafleur, the heirs left the whole house to La Benefica, an important orphanage and charity association in Turin. It was saved from bombing in the Second World War. The building suffered years of decline but in the 1990s was sold to private clients who restored it carefully, giving back the original splendor. At the moment the building is partially appointed to private residence and offices.

== Description ==
The building is located on the edge of the old town, close to other famed residential landmarks such as the Casa della Vittoria and the Villino Raby. It is spread over three floors above ground, plus the attic floor. A privileged location is characterized by angular momentum along the axis of the corso Francia and via Principi d'Acaja where will find the main entrance and driveway access to the inner garden.

Although the structure is characterized by a rather traditional urban setting typical of a bourgeois villa, the building is an excellent and balanced example of combined use of materials. The decoration is very rich, abundant and references Art Nouveau with frequently phytomorphic shapes. The latter constitutes the elements between the two wings of the building and is embellished with a pronounced oriel window with polychrome glazing which exhibits a mixture of wrought iron.

The motifs of twisting lines are also evident in an elegant glass aedicule overlooking the garden terrace, which seems to reference the Parisian sinuosity of Hector Guimard's architecture. The work of Fenoglio, however, seems refreshingly unaffected by the schools of French and Belgian Art Nouveau, not only for the careful stylistic coherence but also the ambition to give the building an international connotation. This prompted Pietro Fenoglio to devote himself personally to designing every detail: from the drawing of the frame chassis, sought relief in shaped-cement, without neglecting the splendid inner door that gives access to the main entrance, the wooden frames of doors, rather than the singular design of cast iron radiators.

The house was carefully restored in the 1990s, returning the building to its original splendor. It now again functions as a private residence and offices.

== Bibliography ==
- Mezzo secolo di architettura 1865-1915. Dalle suggestioni post-risorgimentali ai fermenti del nuovo secolo, Mila Leva Pistoi, Turin, 1969
- Le opere di Pietro Fenoglio nel clima dell’Art Nouveau internazionale, Riccardo Nelva, Bruno Signorelli, editor Dedalo, Bari, 1979
- Il Liberty in Italia, Rossana Bossaglia, Charta, 1997, ISBN 8881581469
