= Schuttbourg Castle =

Castle in Luxenbourg

Coordinates: 49.9645°N 6.0263°E

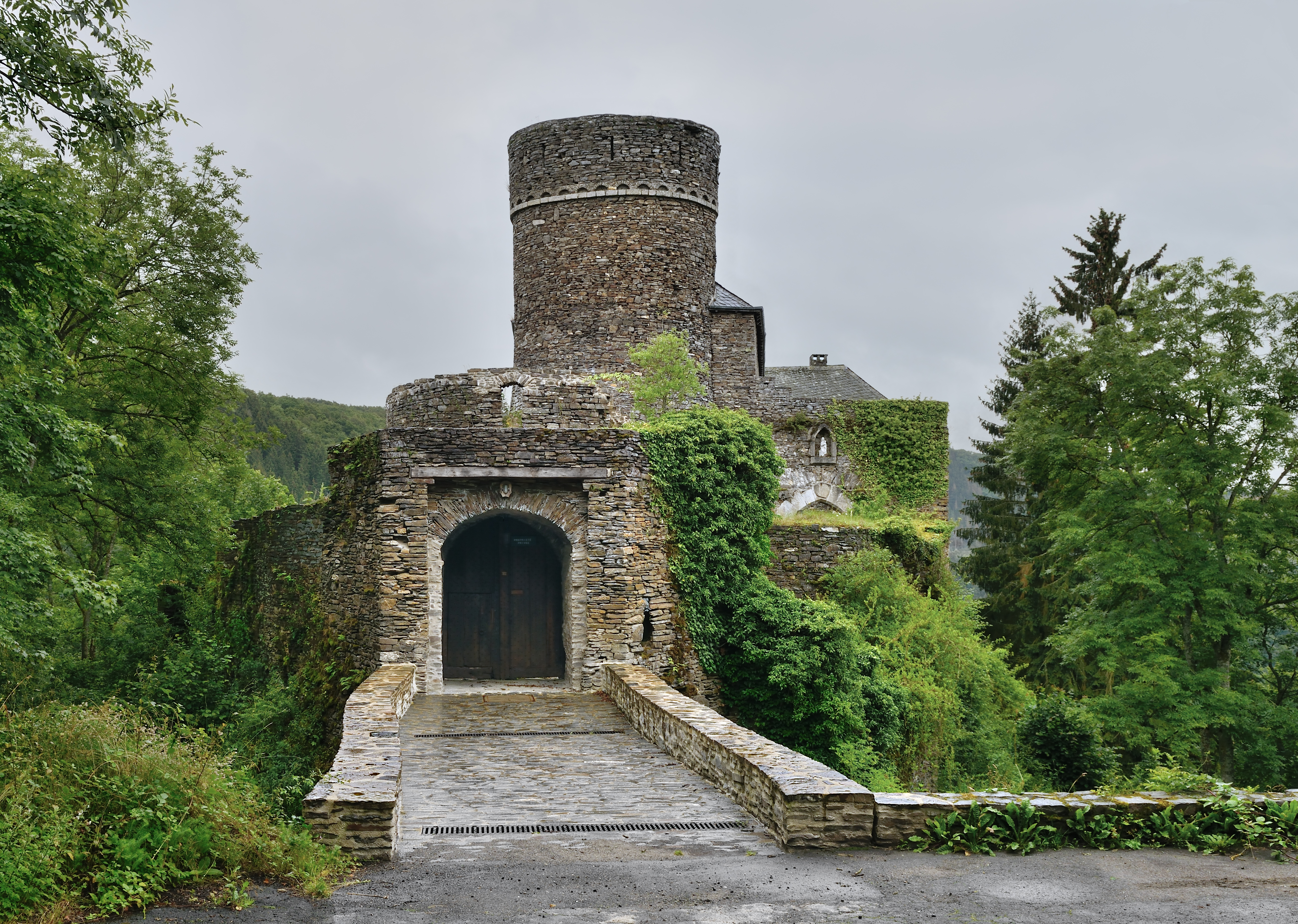
The castle, July 2012.

Schuttbourg (Luxembourgish: Schlass Schibbreg; French: Château de Schuttbourg ) is a castle in Luxembourg. It is located near the town of Kautenbach, above the left bank of the Clerve.
