= Enscherange =

Coordinates: 49.60°N 5.60°E

Enscherange (Luxembourgish: Äischer [ˈæːɪ̯ʃɐ]; German: Enscheringen [ˈɛnʃəʁɪŋən]) is a village in the commune of Kiischpelt, in northern Luxembourg. As of September 2026, the village has a population of 211.
