= Pintsch =

Pintsch Pënsch
- Village
- Location within Luxembourg
- Coordinates: 49°59′34″N 06°00′40″E
- Country: Luxembourg
- Commune: Kiischpelt

Population (2025)
  - Total: 345

Pintsch (German pronunciation: [ˈpɪntʃ]; Luxembourgish: Pënsch [pənʃ]) is a village in the commune of Kiischpelt, in northern Luxembourg. As of September 2026, the village has a population of 349. It was the site of intense fighting between German and American troops in the January 1945, and one of the last sites of conflict of the Battle of the Bulge, being reduced to ruins by the fighting.
