= Collegno =

Collegno Colegn (Piedmontese)
- Comune
- Comune di Collegno
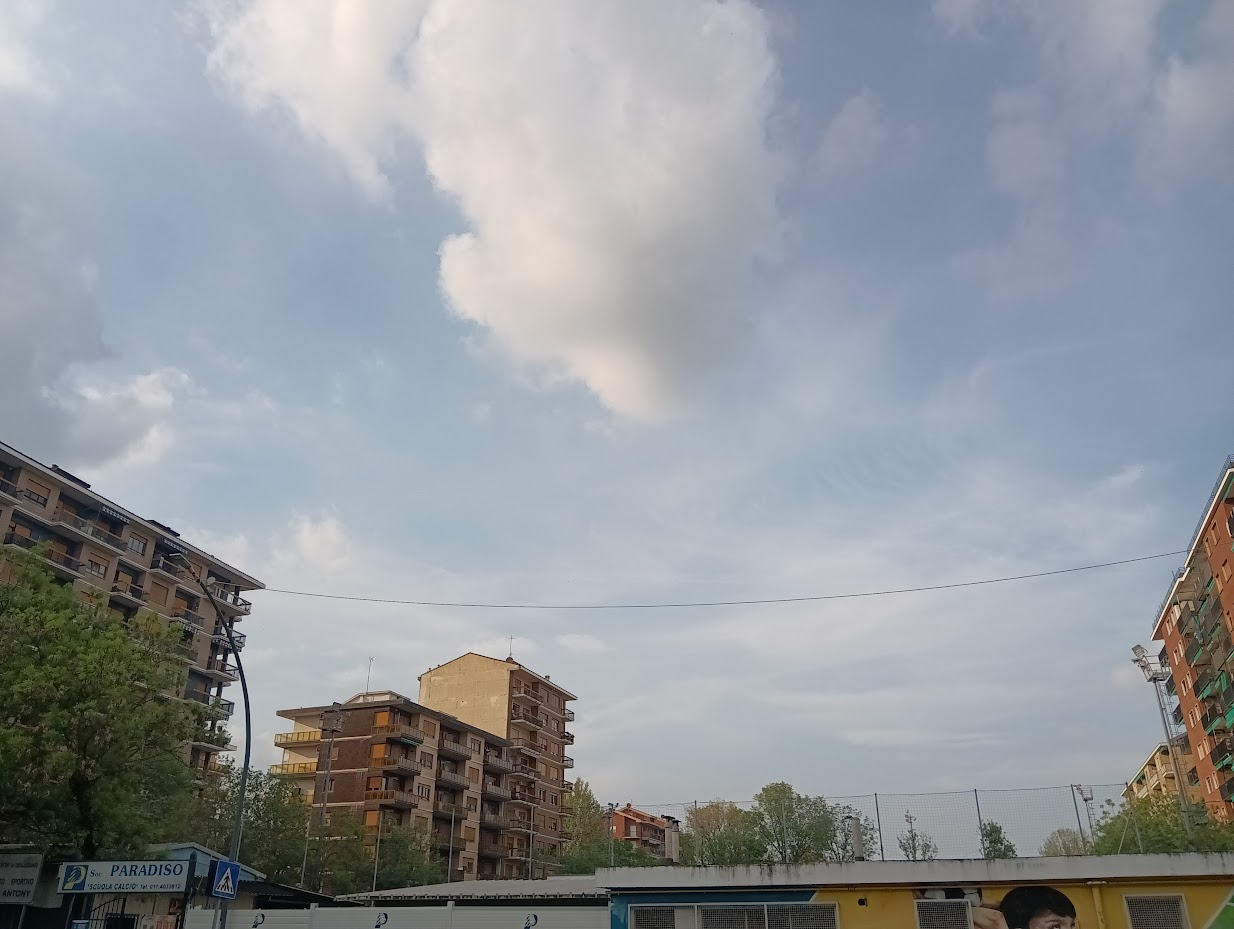
- High-rise apartment buildings in Collegno

- Coat of arms

- Location within Italy Location within Piedmont
- Coordinates: 45°5′N 7°35′E
- Country: Italy
- Region: Piedmont
- Metropolitan city: Turin
- Frazioni: Borgata Paradiso Di Collegno, Leumann, Regina Margherita, Savonera, Baricalla, Basse Dora, Bergera, Campo Sportivo, Gay, Provvidenza, Ricovero Provinciale

Government
  - Mayor: Francesco Casciano

Area
  - Total: 18.10 km^{2} (6.99 sq mi)
- Elevation: 302 m (991 ft)

Population (2026)
  - Total: 47,590
  - Density: 2,629/km^{2} (6,810/sq mi)
- Demonym: Collegnese(i)
- Time zone: UTC+1 (CET)
  - Summer (DST): UTC+2 (CEST)
- Postal code: 10093
- Dialing code: 011
- Patron saint: Saint Lawrence
- Saint day: 10 August
- Website: Official website

Collegno (Italian pronunciation: [kolˈleɲɲo]; Piedmontese: Colegn [kʊˈlɛɲ]) is a city and comune (municipality) in the Metropolitan City of Turin in the region of Piedmont in Italy, located about 9 kilometres (6 miles) west of Turin. It has 47,590 inhabitants.

It occupies an alluvial plain at the end of the Val di Susa, between Rivoli and Turin, at the foot of Monte Musinè. The terminal course of the Dora Riparia flows in its territory.

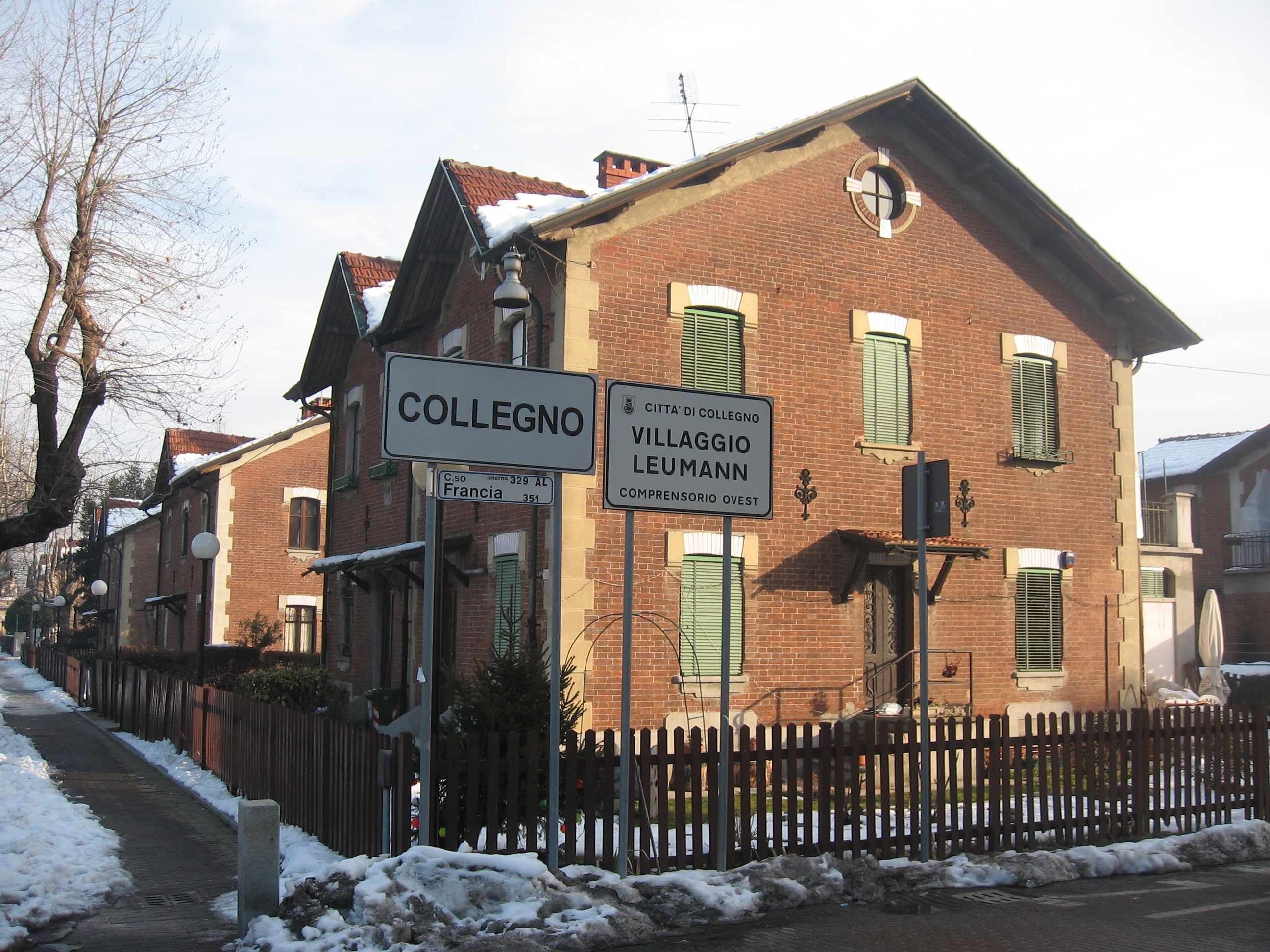
The Leumann village in Collegno

== History ==
Collegno originated as a Roman mansio 8 kilometres (5 mi) from Turin, known as Quintum Collegium (hence the modern name). Ancient findings from the area are now in the Museum of Antiquities in Turin.

From an ancient Roman villa, a richly decorated church was built at the beginning of the 5th century AD, dedicated to San Massimo, the first bishop of Turin.

In 2002, during excavations for the construction of the terminal of line 1 of the Turin Metro, the remains of a Langobard settlement and necropolis came to light. The site has been studied thoroughly until 2006, along with a nearby little gothic cabin's, previously settled.

In 1641, Maria Cristina of France, regent of Savoy Dukedom, ordered the edification of a "Charterhouse" to host a monastery; the large building was designed by M. Valperga, the First Ducal Architect and completed by Juvarra. In 1851 the Monastery was transformed in a hospital for mental ills, then closed in 70s of the past century.

Lajos Kossuth, the exiled leader of the Hungarian Revolution of 1848, lived in the Baraccone section of the village from 1874 until 1882. The former politician bought a villa with a large garden not far from the train station, and spent his days with gardening, botanical expeditions to the Alps, writing his memoirs and receiving Hungarian guests. He was forced to sell the villa due to financial difficulties. The house was demolished in the 1970s.

== Demographics ==
As of 2026, the population is 47,590, of which 47.7% are male, and 52.3% are female. Minors make up 13.6% of the population, and seniors make up 28%.

Historical population

Year	Pop.	±%
1861	2,074	—
1871	2,515	+21.3%
1881	3,168	+26.0%
1901	4,591	+44.9%
1911	6,310	+37.4%
1921	7,714	+22.3%
1931	11,522	+49.4%
1936	12,535	+8.8%

Year	Pop.	±%
1951	13,123	+4.7%
1961	21,282	+62.2%
1971	41,948	+97.1%
1981	46,578	+11.0%
1991	47,161	+1.3%
2001	46,641	−1.1%
2011	49,083	+5.2%
2021	48,574	−1.0%

Source: ISTAT

=== Immigration ===
As of 2025, of the known countries of birth of 47,365 residents, the most numerous are: Italy (44,211 – 93.3%), Romania (1,068 – 2.3%), Morocco (268 – 0.6%).

== Twin towns and sister cities ==
Collegno is twinned with:

- Antony, France
- Sárospatak, Hungary
- Volzhsky, Russia
- Neubrandenburg, Germany
- Cerdanyola del Vallès, Spain
- San Gregorio Magno, Italy
- Oueslatia, Tunisia
- Sarajevo, Bosnia and Herzegovina
- Havířov, Czech Republic
- Rocchetta Sant'Antonio, Italy

== See also ==
- Bruneri-Canella case
