= XVIII Dicembre (Turin Metro) =

Turin Metro station

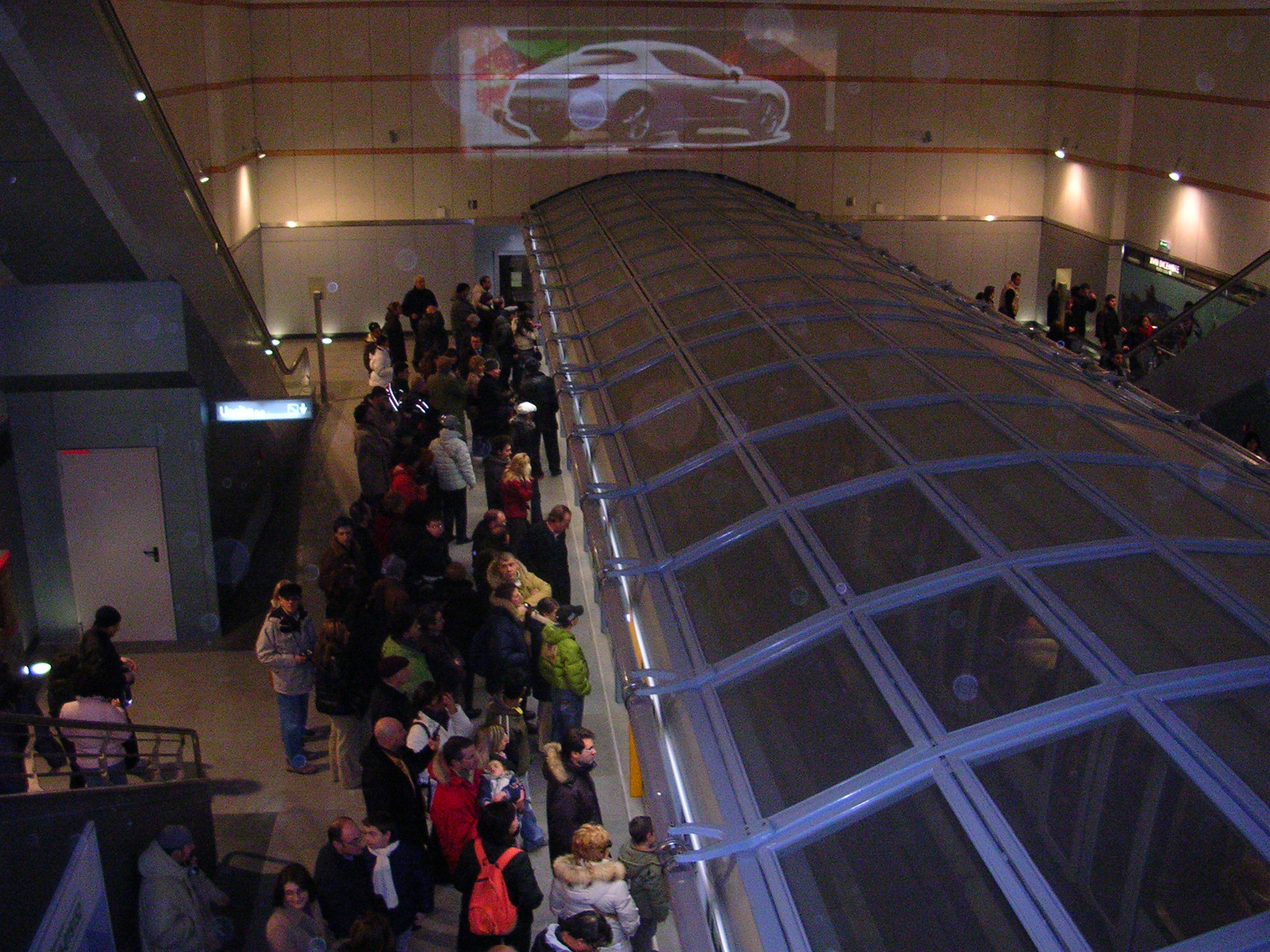

General information
- Location: Piazza XVIII Dicembre, Turin
- Coordinates: 45°04′28″N 7°40′06″E
- Owner: GTT
- Platforms: 2
- Tracks: 2

Construction
- Structure type: Underground
- Accessible: Yes

History
- Opened: 4 February 2006

Services
| Preceding station | Turin Metro | Following station |
|---|---|---|
| Principi d'Acaja towards Fermi | Line 1 | Porta Susa towards Bengasi |
Location

XVIII Dicembre is a Turin Metro station, located under Piazza XVIII Dicembre, near Porta Susa railway station. The station was opened on 4 February 2006 as the eastern terminus of the inaugural section of Turin Metro, between Fermi and XVIII Dicembre. It ceased to be terminal on 5 October 2007, when a new section of the Metro (to Porta Nuova) was opened.

The platforms feature decals by Ugo Nespolo, depicting the 1922 Turin massacre.

== Services ==
- Ticket vending machines
- Handicap accessibility
- Elevators
- Escalators
- Active CCTV surveillance
