= Fermi (Turin Metro) =

Turin Metro station

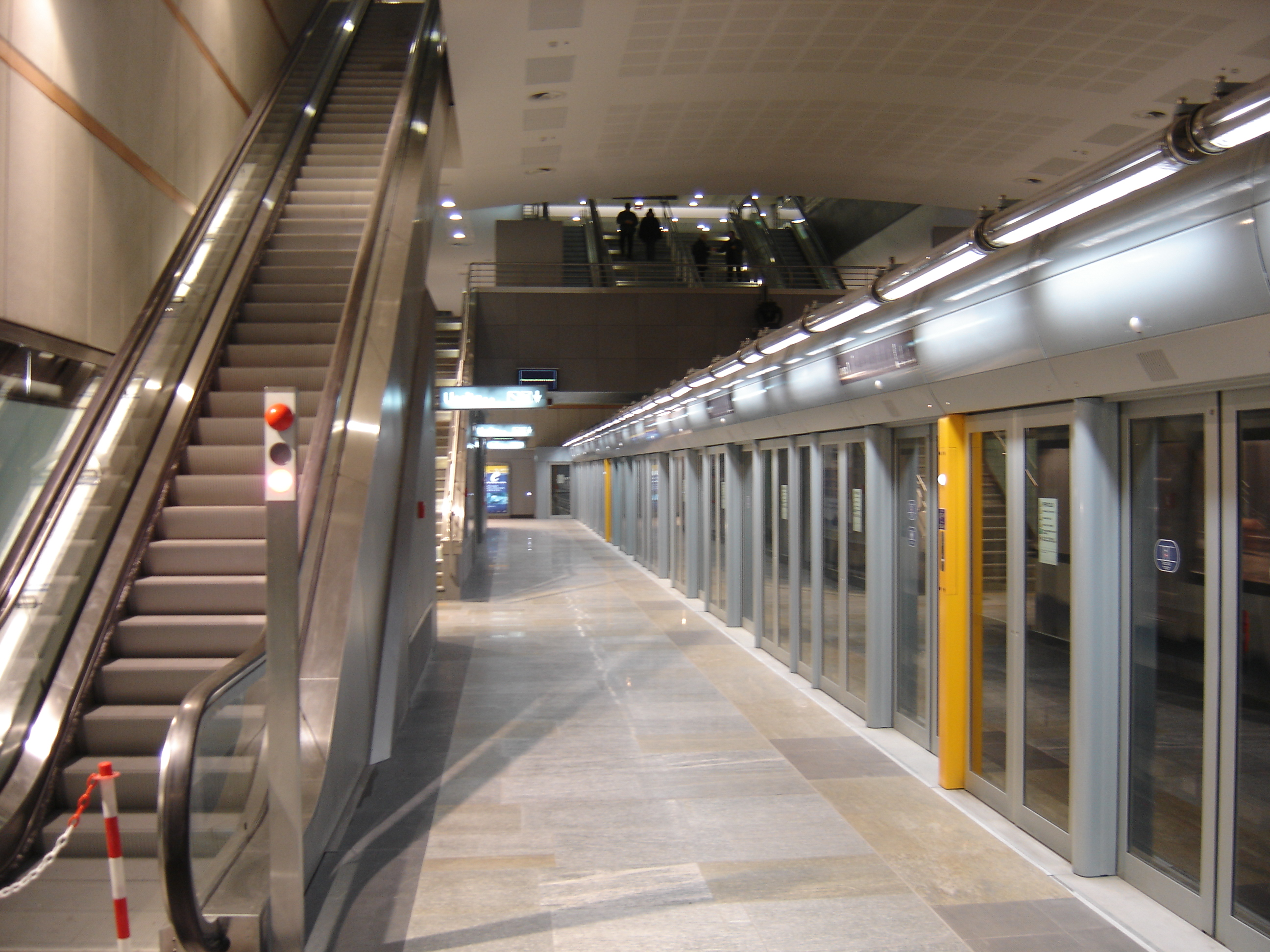

General information
- Location: Via De Amicis, Collegno
- Coordinates: 45°04′34″N 7°35′29″E
- Owner: GTT

Construction
- Structure type: Underground
- Parking: park and ride
- Accessible: Yes

History
- Opened: 4 February 2006

Services
Preceding station	Turin Metro	Following station
Terminus	Line 1	Paradiso towards Bengasi
Location

Fermi is a Turin Metro station, located in the Turin suburb of Collegno, near the intersection between Via Edmondo De Amicis and Via Enrico Fermi. Being the westerly terminus of Line 1, there is an adjacent park and ride lot with more than 300 spaces and connecting bus service from Rivoli. The station was opened on 4 February 2006 as the western terminus of the inaugural section of Turin Metro, between Fermi and XVIII Dicembre.

== Services ==
- Parking lot with more than 300 spaces
- Ticket vending machines
- Handicap accessibility
- Elevators
- Escalators
- Active CCTV surveillance
