= Ugo Nespolo =

Italian painter and sculptor

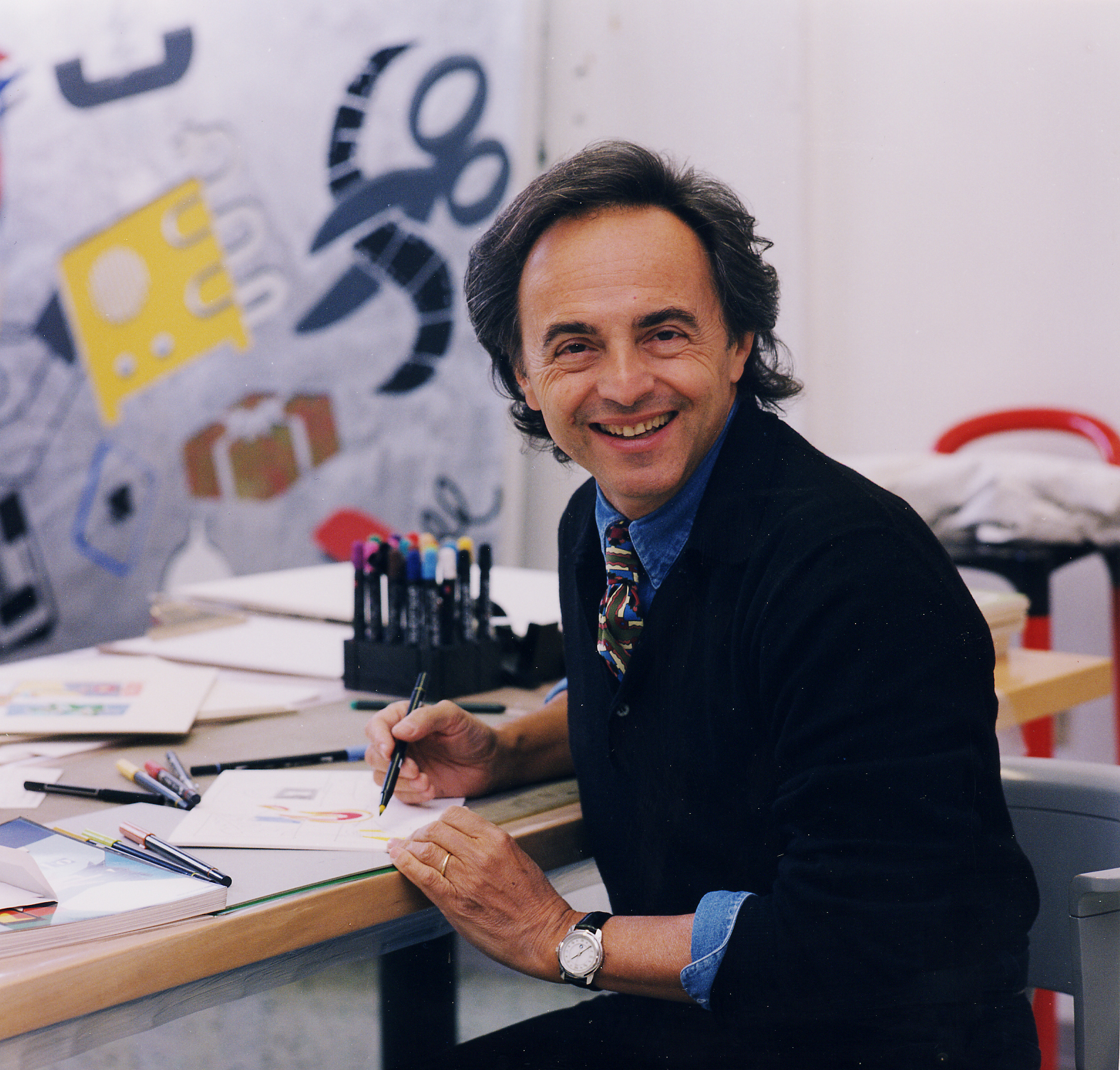
- Born: 29 August 1941 (age 84); Mosso, Biella, Italy
- Education: Accademia Albertina di Belle Arti, Turin
- Known for: Painting, Sculpture

Ugo Nespolo (born 29 August 1941 in Mosso, Biella) is an Italian artist, painter, sculptor, filmmaker and writer. He lives and works in Turin.

== Life and works ==
Nespolo graduated at the Accademia Albertina di Belle Arti of Turin with Enrico Paulucci and obtained a degree in Modern Literature at the University of Turin, with a thesis on Semiology.

His career as an artist started in the 1960s. His work was influenced by Pop Art, which was becoming popular in Italy in those years, conceptual art, Arte Povera and Fluxus. He had a chance to see and appreciate closely these movements during a trip to the United States in 1967. He would then continue to regularly visit the States, where he would spend long periods of time, especially during the 1980s. Irony and transgression became key element in Nespolo's art and characterised his work for many years to come. Since 2010 he has been member of the Honour Committee of "Immagine & Poesia", an artistic literary movement founded in Turin, with the patronage of Aeronwy Thomas (Dylan Thomas's daughter). In 2016 he signed the pptArt Manifesto, an international art movement that promote many notable initiatives like the Corporate Art Awards.

=== Cinema ===
In the mid-1960s Nespolo started to work with experimental cinema. His first film, Grazie, mamma Kodak, is from 1966. His friends and fellow artists such as Lucio Fontana, Enrico Baj, Michelangelo Pistoletto and others appeared regularly in his films. Nespolo's second film, A.G. (1968), documents the visit to Turin of Allen Ginsberg. In 2001 he directed Film/a/TO, with the main character role played by Edoardo Sanguineti. Nespolo's films have been exhibited in institutions like the Beaubourg in Paris, the Philadelphia Museum of Modern Art, Warsaw's Filmoteka Polska and Ferrara's Galleria Civica d'Arte Moderna. Nespolo has produced and directed about twenty films over forty years.

=== Applied arts ===
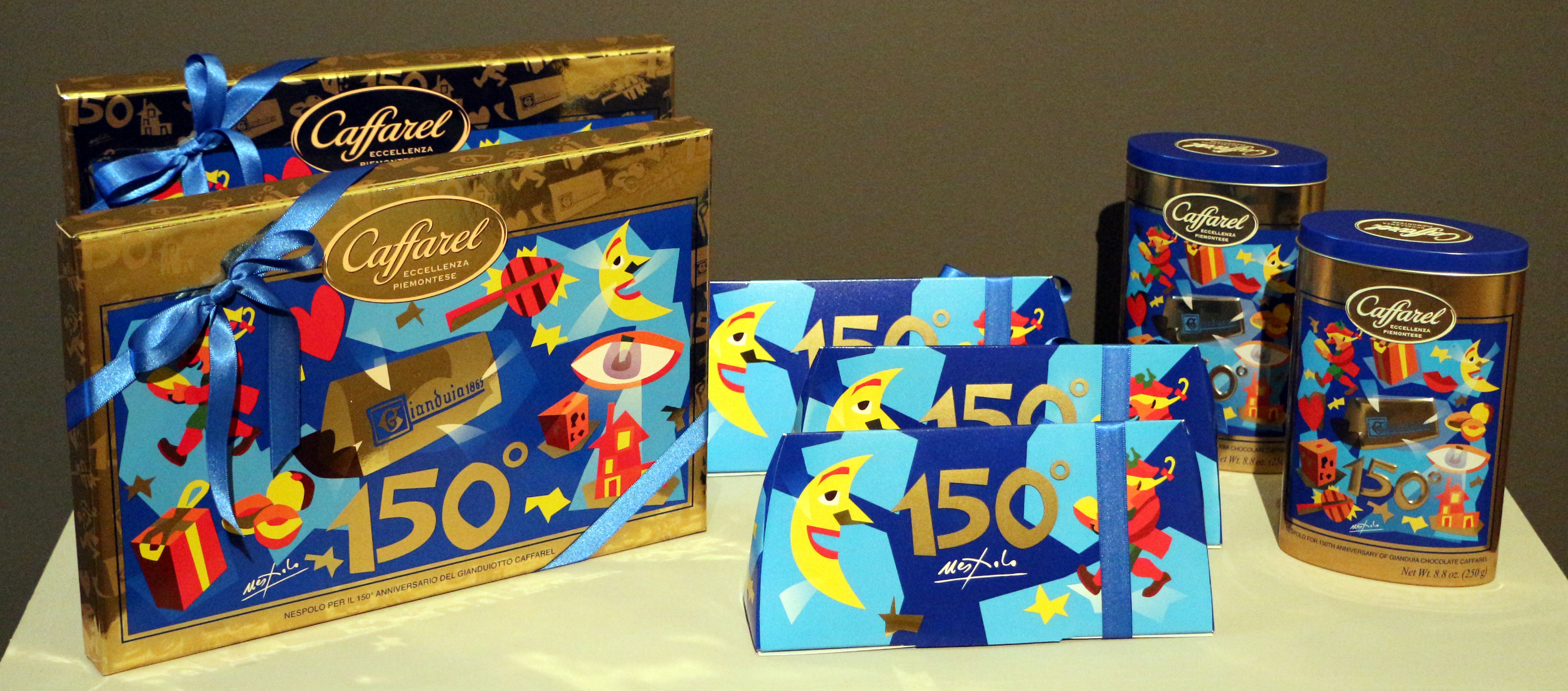
Example of a special packaging created by Nespolo for the 150th anniversary of Gianduiotto

In the 1980s, Nespolo made ceramics and blown glass objects, created over fifty posters for exhibitions and other events, did advertising campaigns for Campari and Azzurra and realised title sequences for shows on the Italian national broadcast television RAI. In 2002, Nespolo was appointed artistic coordinator for the Metropolitana di Torino, with the aim of realising the first "underground museum of modern art". Several underground stations are decorated with his glass etchings and images.

=== Theatre ===
In 1986 Nespolo had the possibility of designing the stage sets for Ferruccio Busoni’s opera Turandot at Connecticut Grand Opera, Stamford, the first of several theatre works he made in the following years, such as the sets and costumes for Paisiello's Don Chisciotte at the Teatro dell'Opera di Roma in 1990 and for Donizetti's L'elisir d'amore, a production for the Rome Opera, the Paris Opera and the Lausanne Opera, Liège and Metz in 1995. In 2007, he designed stage and costumes for Puccini's Madama Butterfly at the Festival Puccini 2007 in Torre del Lago.

=== Palio and traditions ===
Nespolo was appreciated also for his work with Palios. In 1998, he was committed the Palio for the Giostra della Quintana, Ascoli Piceno. In 2000, he was awarded for his work for Palio di Asti and in 1991 and 2009 for the Palio of the Giostra della Quintana in Foligno. He was chosen to design the Palio (Drappellone or banner) at the Palio dell'Assunta in August 2007.

=== Selected exhibitions ===
Nespolo's works covering his whole production have been presented or hosted in major national and international exhibitions.

A selected list of exhibitions and venues is the following:

- Ugo Nespolo, Palazzo Reale Arengario, Milan, 1990
- International Biennale of Ceramics and Antiques, Faenza Exhibition Center, 1990
- International Ceramics Festival, Shigaraki Ceramic World, Japan, 1991
- A Fine Intolerance (Nespolo's paintings and ceramics), Borghi and Co. Gallery, New York, 1992
- Casa d'Arte Nespolo, Palazzo della Permanenente, Milan, 1995
- Romanian Ministry of Culture, Bucharest, 1995
- Le Stanze dell'Arte, Promotrice delle Belle Arti, Turin, 1996
- National Museum of Fine Arts in Valletta, Malta, 1997
- Itinerant exhibition, 1997:
  - Museo Nacional de Bellas Artes, Buenos Aires
  - Centro de Arte Contemporaneo de Cordoba, Chateau Carrera, Córdoba
  - Museo Municipal de Arte Moderno de Mendoza, Mendoza
  - Museo Nacional de Artes Visuales, Montevideo
- Rocca Paolina/Spello Villa Fidelia, Perugia, 1999
- Palazzo Reale, Naples, 2000
- Turin, berceau du cinéma italien, Centre Pompidou, Paris, 2001
- 2001 Italy in Japan, Fukui, Japan, 2001
- International Sculpture at La Mandria, Villa dei Laghi, Venaria Reale (Turin), 2002
- Itinerant exhibition in Eastern Europe, 2003:
  - Modern Art Gallery, Moscow
  - St. Petersburg
  - Minsk
  - Modern Art Gallery Riga, Latvia
- Istituto Italiano di Cultura, Paris, 2003
- International Film Festival of Locarno, Switzerland, 2003
- Chinese National Museum of Peking, 2003
- Ciurlionis National Museum of Art, Vilnius, Lithuania, 2004
- Guang Dong Museum of Art of Guangzhou, Canton, China, 2004
- Moscow Museum of Modern Art, Moscow, 2004
- Fine Arts Russian Academy, St. Petersburg, 2004
- Poldi Pezzoli Museum, Milan, 2005
- Hong Kong Cultural Centre, Hong Kong, 2005
- Dentro e Fuori, Museo Nazionale del Cinema of Turin, 2005
- Museo del Cinema of Turin, 2008
- Italics, organized with the Chicago Museum of Contemporary Art, Palazzo Grassi, Venice, 2008
- 48th Ceramics Exhibition of Castellamonte, 2008
- Nespolo. Ritorno a casa. Un percorso antologico, Biella, Italy, 2009

== Filmography ==
Nespolo's filmography includes:

Year	Title	Note
1966	Grazie, mamma Kodak	
1967	Le gote in fiamme	
1967	Neonmerzare	
1967	La galante avventura del cavaliere dal lieto volto	
1968	Tucci-ucci	
1968	A.G.	
1968	Boettinbianchenero	
1968	Buongiorno, Michelangelo	
1973	Con-certo rituale	
1975	Un supermaschio	
1976	Andare a Roma	
1978	Il faticoso tempo della sicurezza (Lo spaccone)	
1982	Le porte girevoli	
1984	Fontane a Torino ovvero: alla ricerca dello zampillo perduto	as actor; director: Luciana Ros
1994	Time after time	
2001	Film/a/TO	exhibited at Turin, berceau du cinéma italien, Centre Pompidou, Paris
2005	Italiana	
2005	Ativa. Un ritratto	
2005	Glance. As far as the eye can see	
2005	Dentro e fuori. Angelo Pezzana. Un ritratto	
2006	La metro a Torino	
2007	Superglance	
2007	Stefania Belmondo "Più veloce dell’aquila"	
2007	Peopling The Palaces at Venaria Reale	as actor; director: Peter Greenaway
2007	Superglance	
