= Kiripalogo =

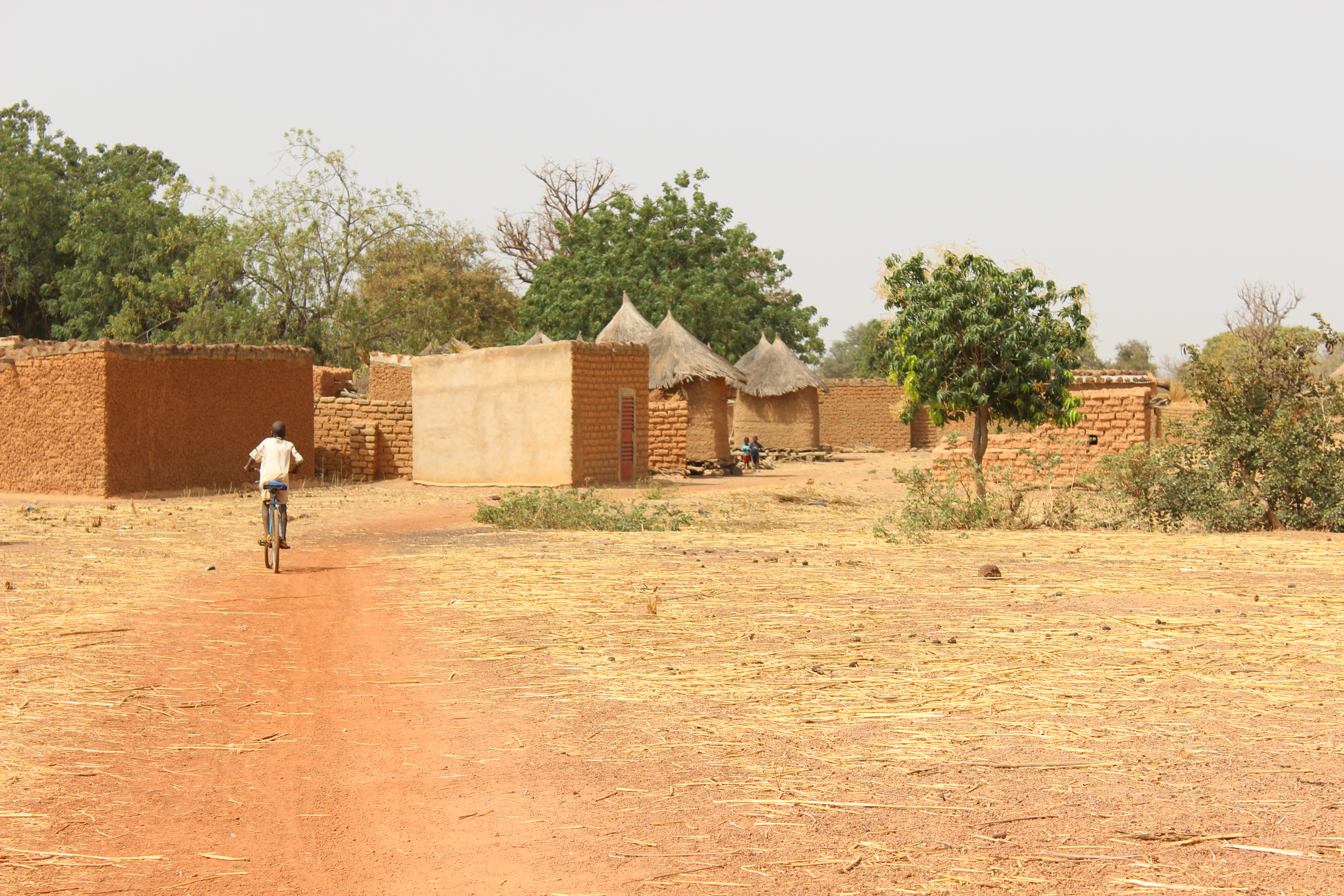
- Kiripalogo

- Location within Burkina Faso
- Country: Burkina Faso
- Province: Zondoma
- Department: Boussou Department

Population 2006
  - Total: 1,144

Kiripalogo is a rural municipality located in the Boussou Department in the province of Zondoma in the Northern region of Burkina Faso.

== Geography ==
Kiripalogo is 12 km northwest of town of Boussou, the capital of the department, 5 km southwest of Posso, and about 50 km southwest of Gourcy.

== History ==
Kiripalogo is located in the former Mossi kingdom.

== Health and educational resources ==
The nearest health centre is the Health and Social Promotion Centre (CSPS) in Posso, while the medical centre is in Gourcy. Kiripalogo has since 2014 one of the three general education colleges (CEG) of the department. The departmental high school is located in Boussou.

== Gallery ==
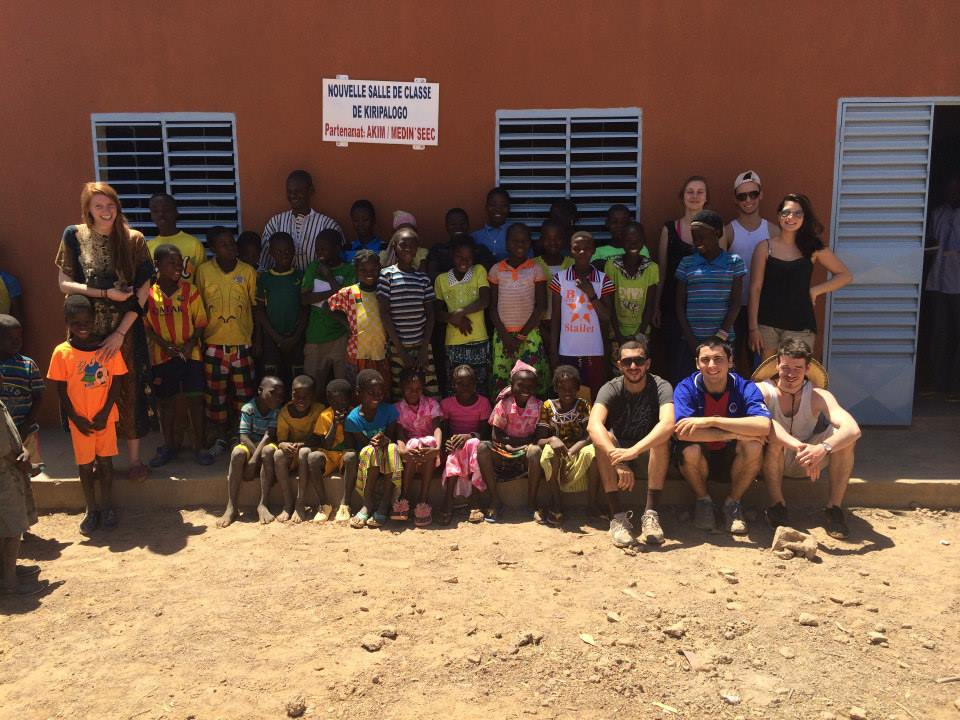
New classroom inaugurated at Kiripalogo in 2014

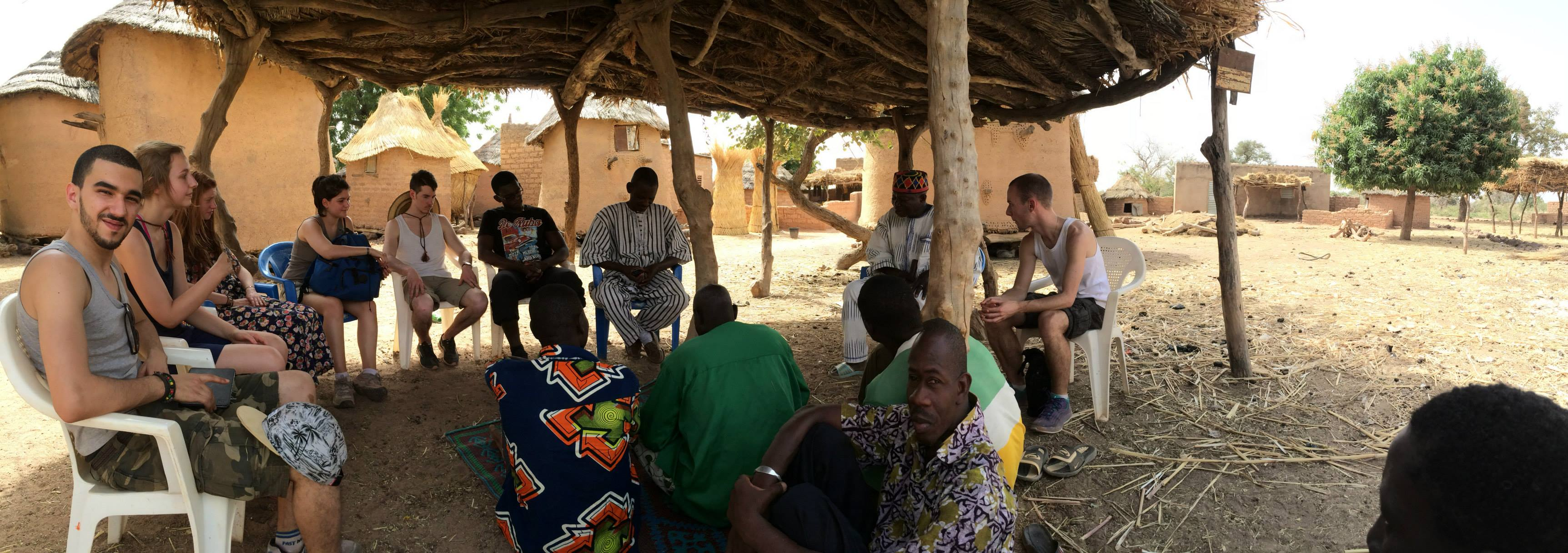
Meeting between traditional leaders and humanitarians in Kiripalogo

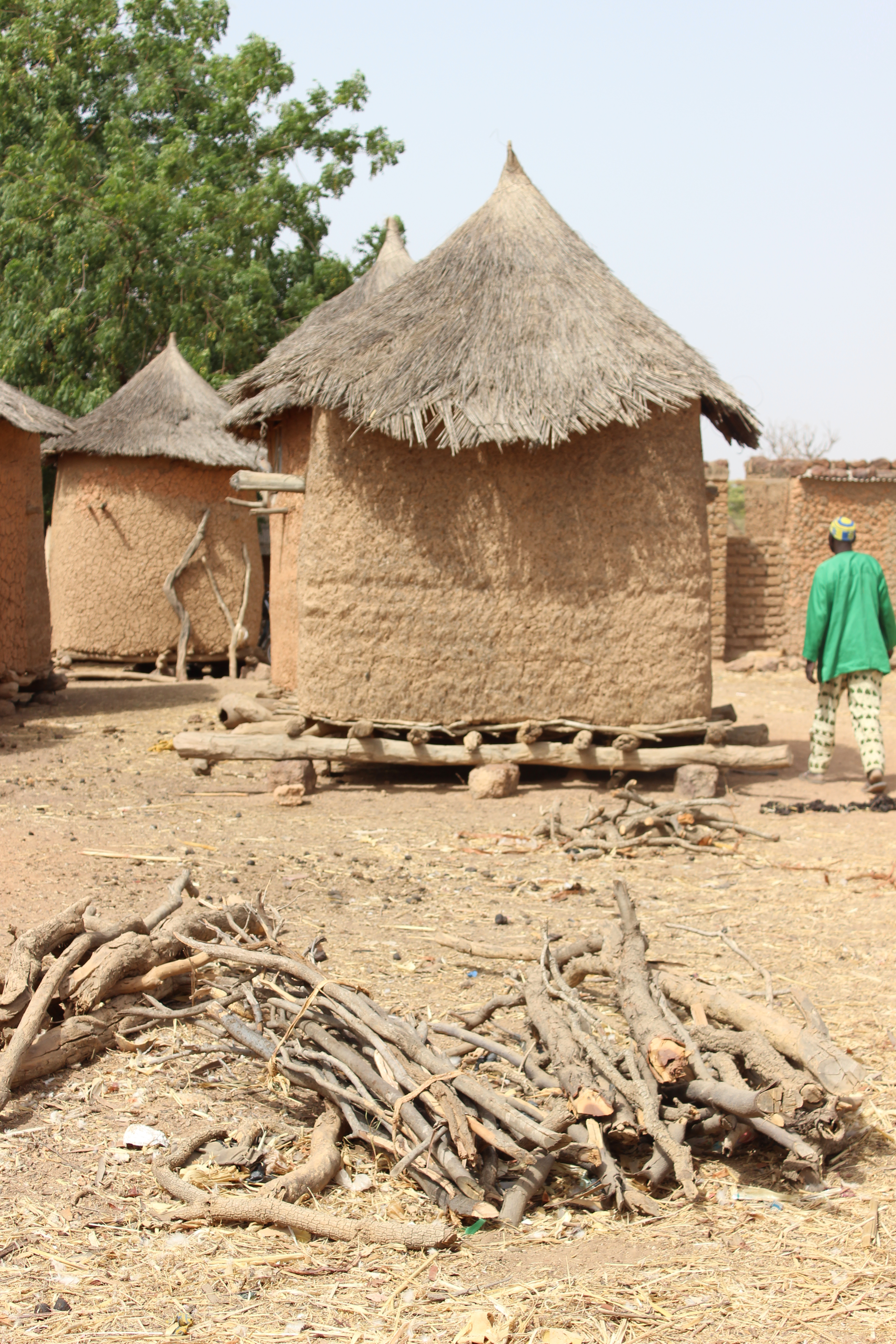
Traditional Mossi Huts in Kiripalogo
