= Sassi–Superga tramway =

Steep grade railway line in the city of Turin in northern Italy

Coordinates: 45°4′43″N 7°45′29″E

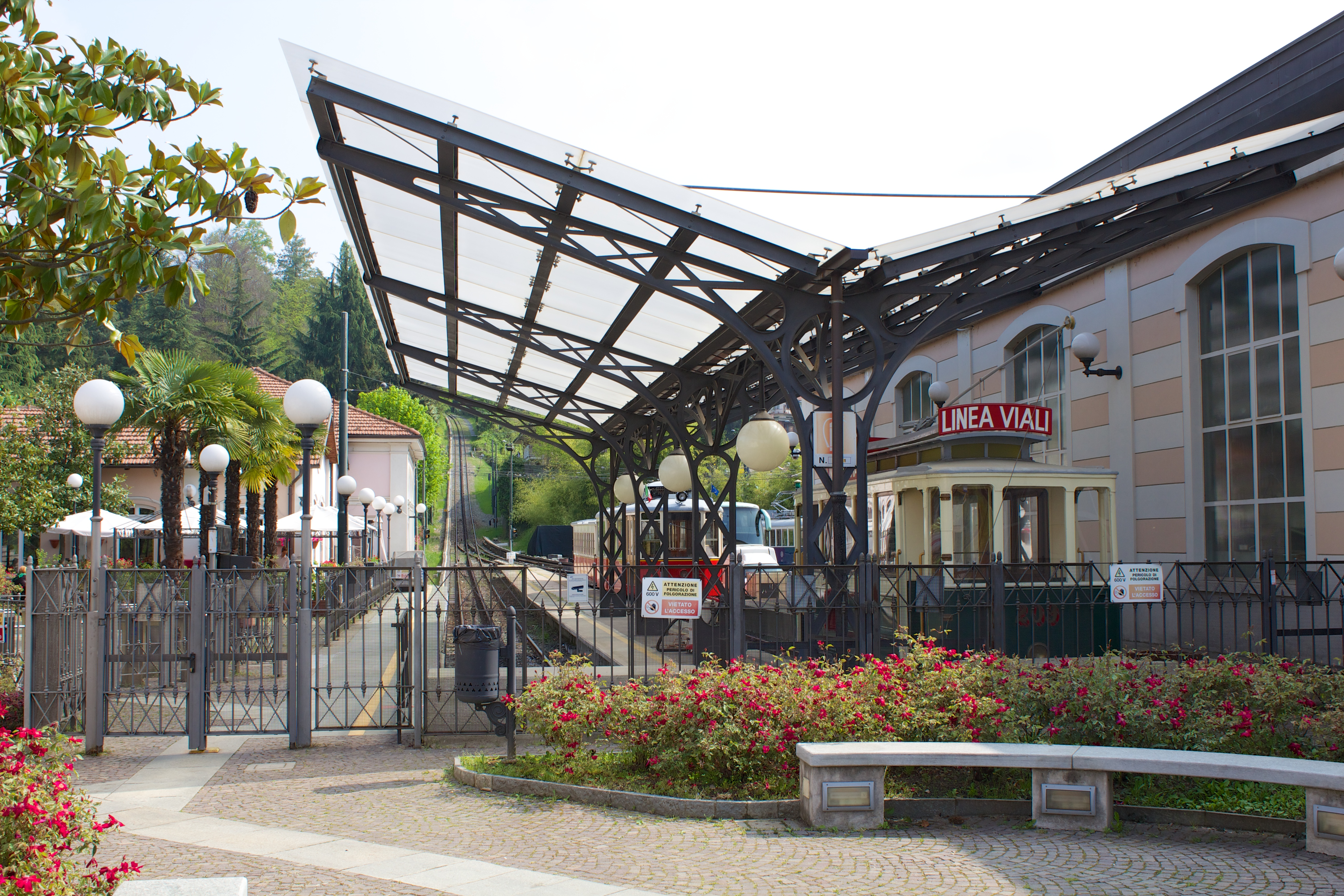
- Sassi station

Overview
- Status: in use
- Line number: 79
- Termini: Sassi, Turin; Superga
- Stations: 5

Service
- Type: Light rail Rack railway
- Operator(s): Gruppo Torinese Trasporti
- Depot(s): Sassi

History
- Opened: 26 April 1884
- Closed: 24 October 1934 (for rebuilding)
- Reopened: 16 April 1935

Technical
- Line length: 3.1 km (1.9 mi)
- Number of tracks: 1
- Rack system: Strub
- Track gauge: 1,445 mm (4 ft 8 7/8 in)
- Electrification: Third rail, 600 V =
- Operating speed: 14 km/h (8.7 mph)
Route map
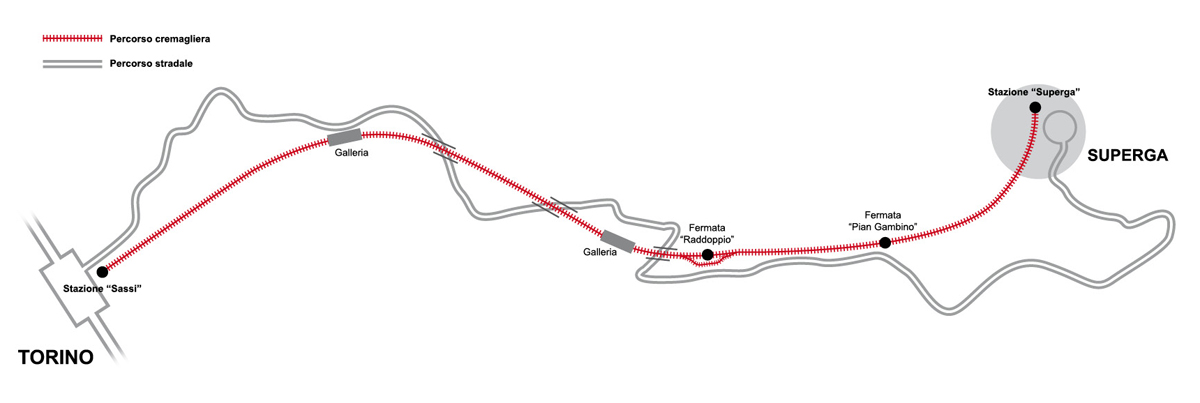

The Sassi–Superga tramway is a steep grade railway line in the city of Turin in northern Italy. Managed by Gruppo Torinese Trasporti, it connects the Turin suburb of Sassi to the Basilica of Superga at an altitude of 672 m (2,205 ft). The lower station is situated at an altitude of 225 m (738 ft) a.s.l., the upper at 650 m (2,130 ft). From here, high in the hills facing the city across the River Po, a panorama of Turin is visible against a backdrop of the Alps. Intermediate stops (only on demand) are located at Prima Galleria, Raddoppio, and Pian Gambino.

The line was opened on 27 April 1884 as a cable driven rack railway of the Agudio system. In this system cables ran along the side of the track and passed around two large pulleys on each side of the cars, which in turn drove the cog wheels that propelled the train consisting of the driven car (only occupied by the driver and a brakeman) and up to three passenger cars. The cable was originally driven by a steam engine in the upper station, from 1922 on by an electric motor. During World War I passenger numbers dropped sharply, so that the line was temporarily shut down until 1919.

After an accident, in which one of the cables broke, but the emergency brake prevented further damage, the line was converted to a conventional electric rack railway using the Strub rack system. Work started on 24 October 1934, the line re-opened on 16 April 1935. Guides for the previous cables can still be found along the line. New motor cars were built by Officine Meccaniche della Stanga. Some of the old passenger cars remained in use, others were sold.

The 1,445 mm (4 ft 8 7/8 in) gauge single-tracked line is 3.1 km (1.9 mi) long and overcomes a difference in height of 419 m (1,375 ft) with a mean gradient of 13.5% and a maximum gradient of 21%, the latter on the final section between Pian Gambino and Superga. The line is electrified with a third rail at 600 volts. A passing loop is located at Radoppio halt. Trains reach the summit in approximately eighteen minutes. Although it does not run in the street, the line and its cars have some of the characteristics of a tramway, and the line is often referred to as such. It is integrated into the public transport network of Turin as line No. 79.

Three pure-rack motor cars are used. Each of them can move up to two unpowered cars. Every such trains can carry up to 220 passengers. The depot has no rack, nor third electrified rail, so that the rack engines and carriages are shunted by a small electric locomotive fed by overhead wires. The track connection to Turin's urban tramway network is used to transfer rolling stock to and from the workshop.

== Gallery ==
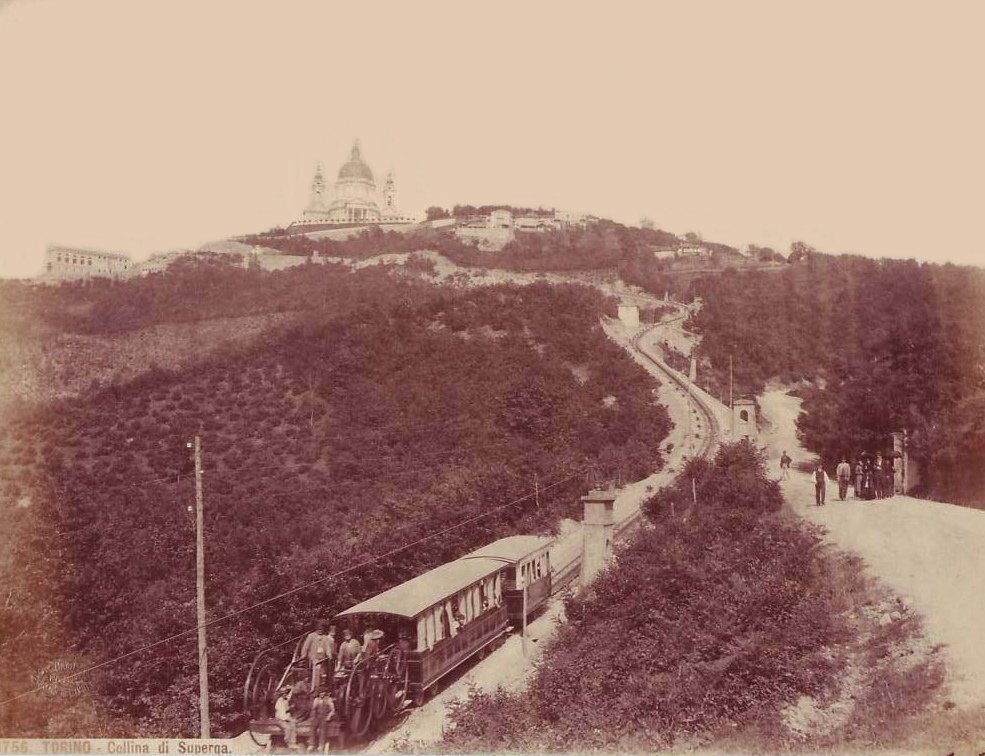
Sassi–Superga being operated by cable haulage

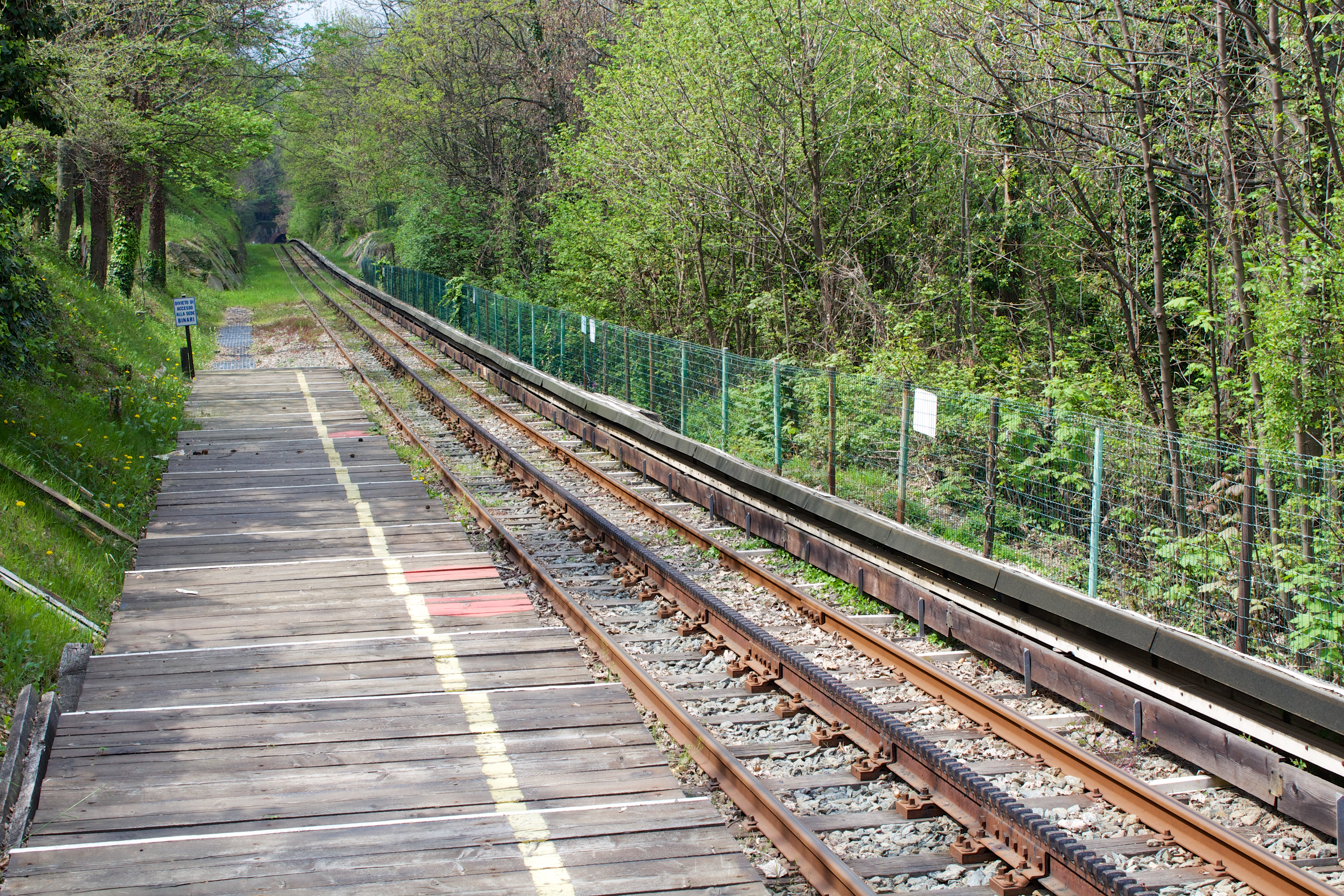
Pian Gambino stop

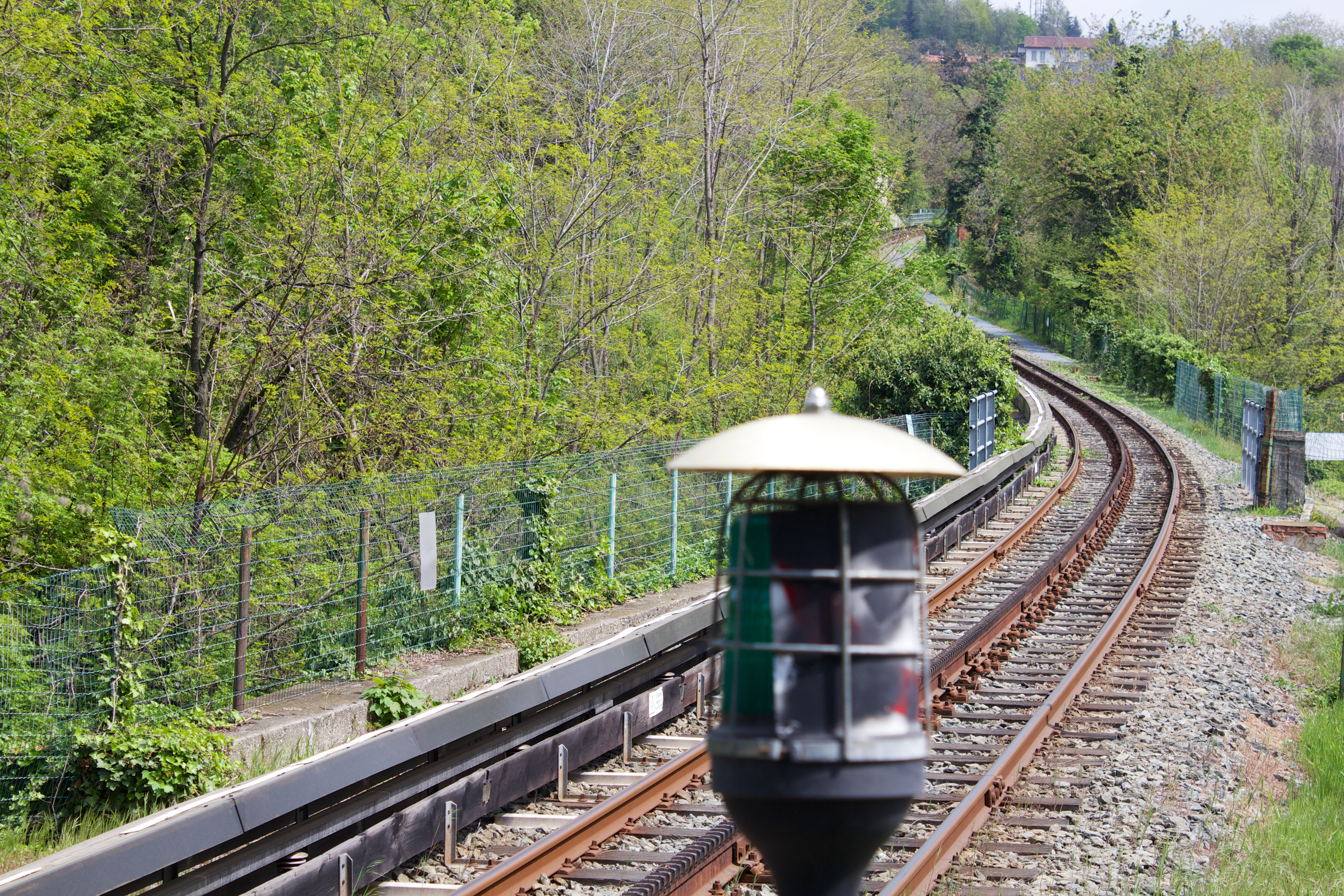
The line with third rail and rack

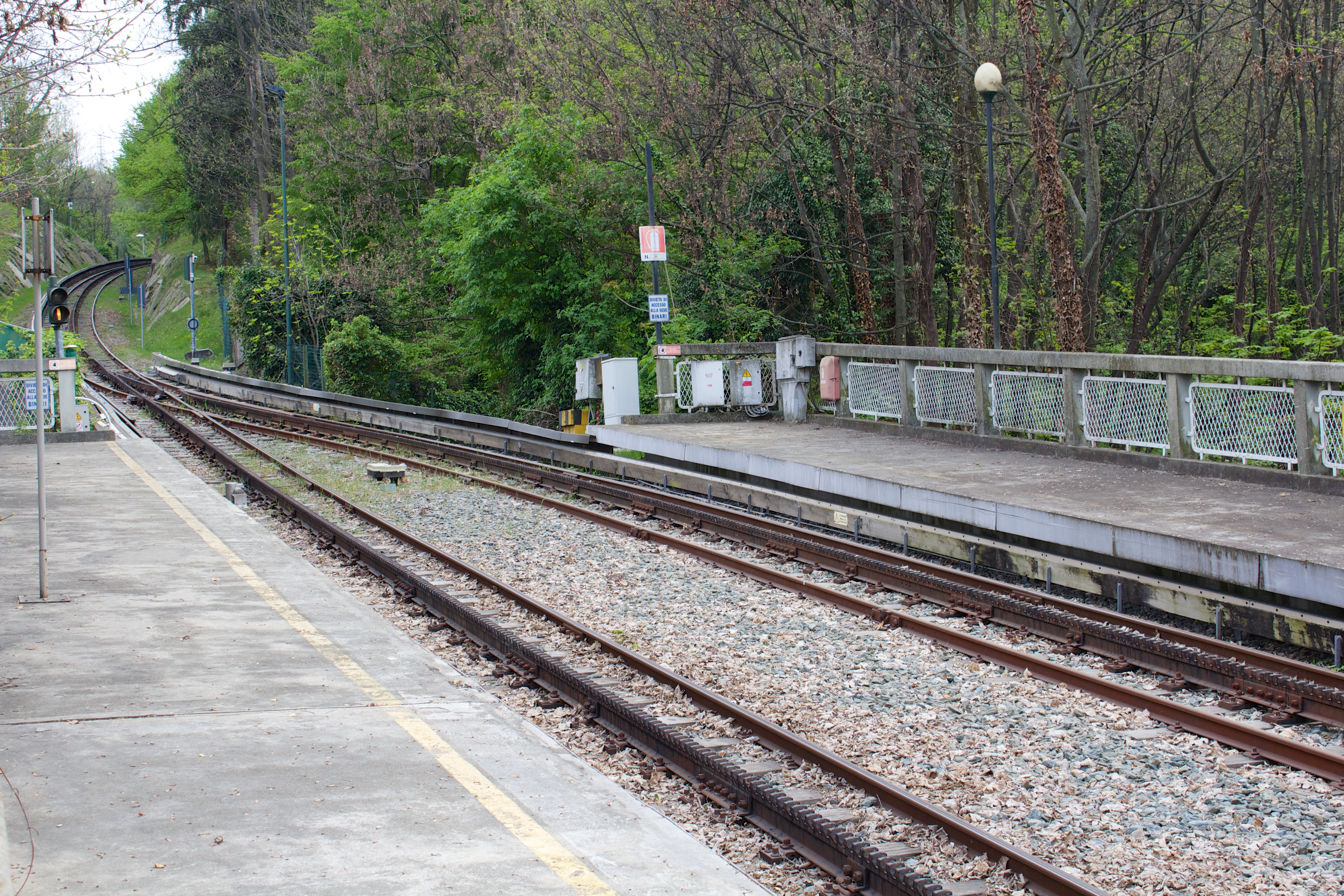
At Radoppio stop

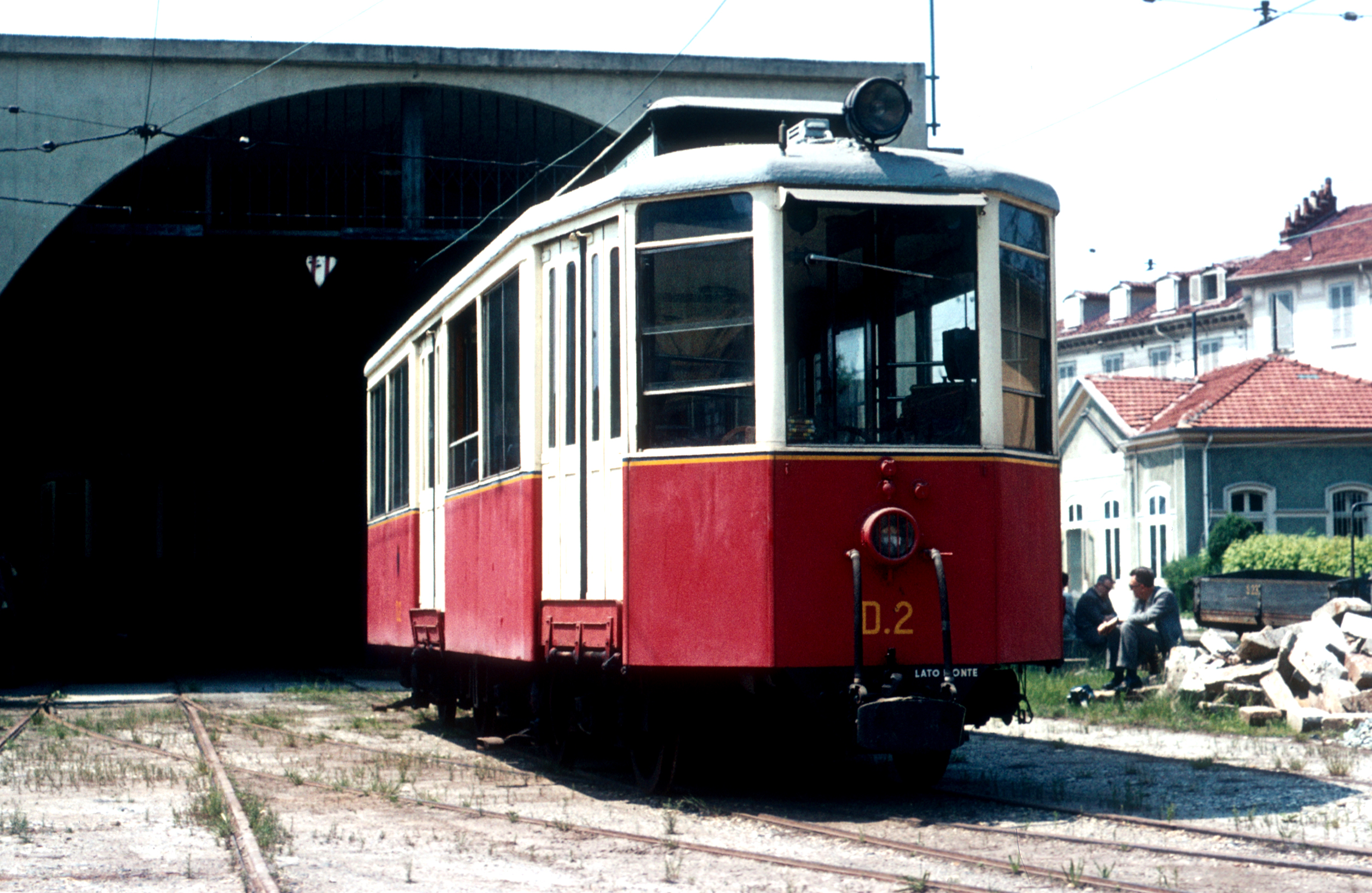
Motor car

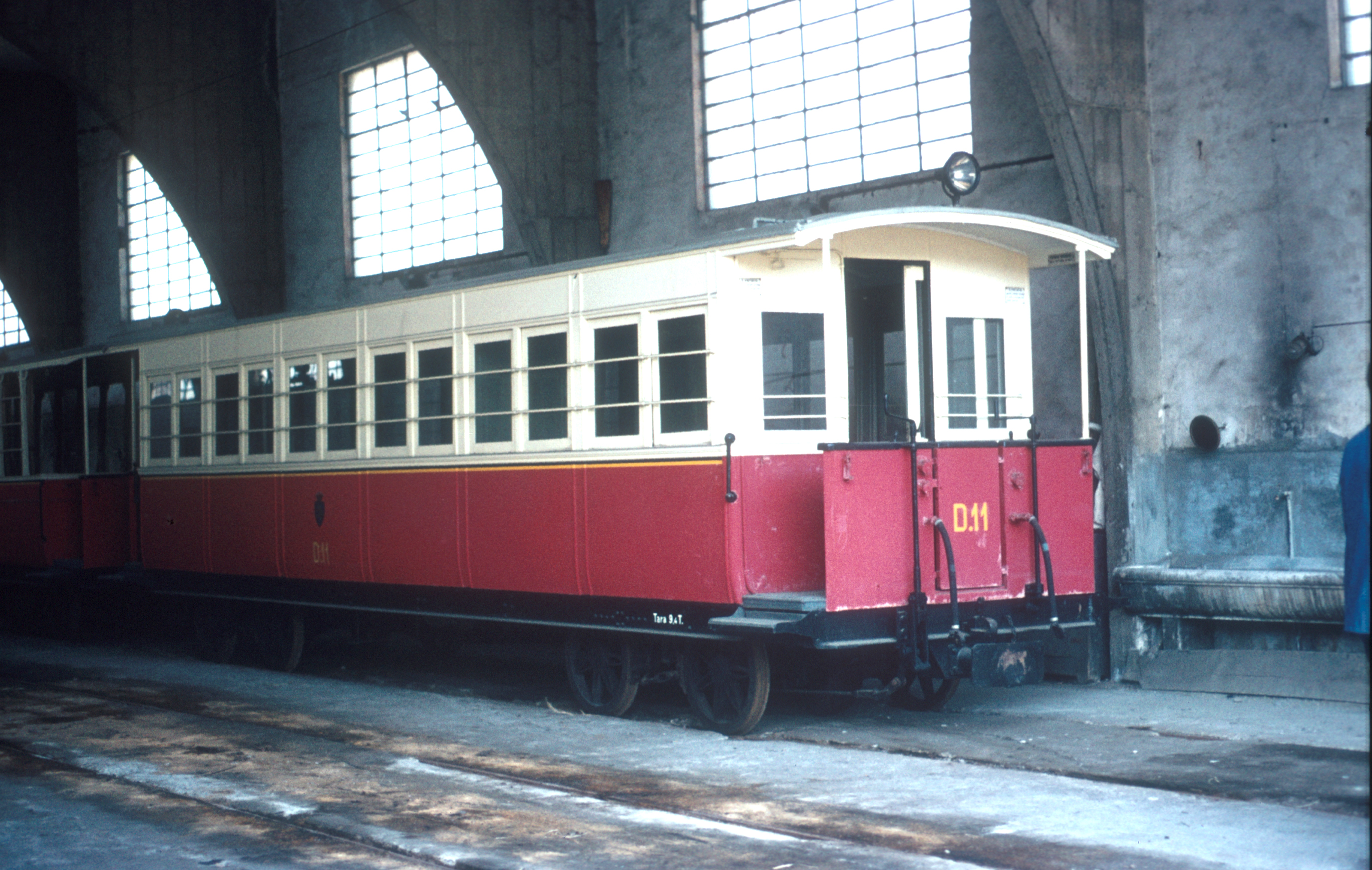
Passenger car

== Bibliography ==
- Tommaso Agudio (1880). Proposta, note e schiarimenti per la domanda di concessione della Ferrovia di Soperga su cui il Consiglio Provinciale di Torino è invitato a pronunciarsi dal Ministero dei Lavori pubblici. Turin: Vincenzo Bona. Proposal with notes
- Massimo Condolo (2006). Sassi-Superga. Funicolare e tranvia a dentiera nella storia della collina torinese. Brescia: Fondazione Negri. ISBN 88-89108-05-3.
