= ATM Class 7000 =

Light rail vehicle

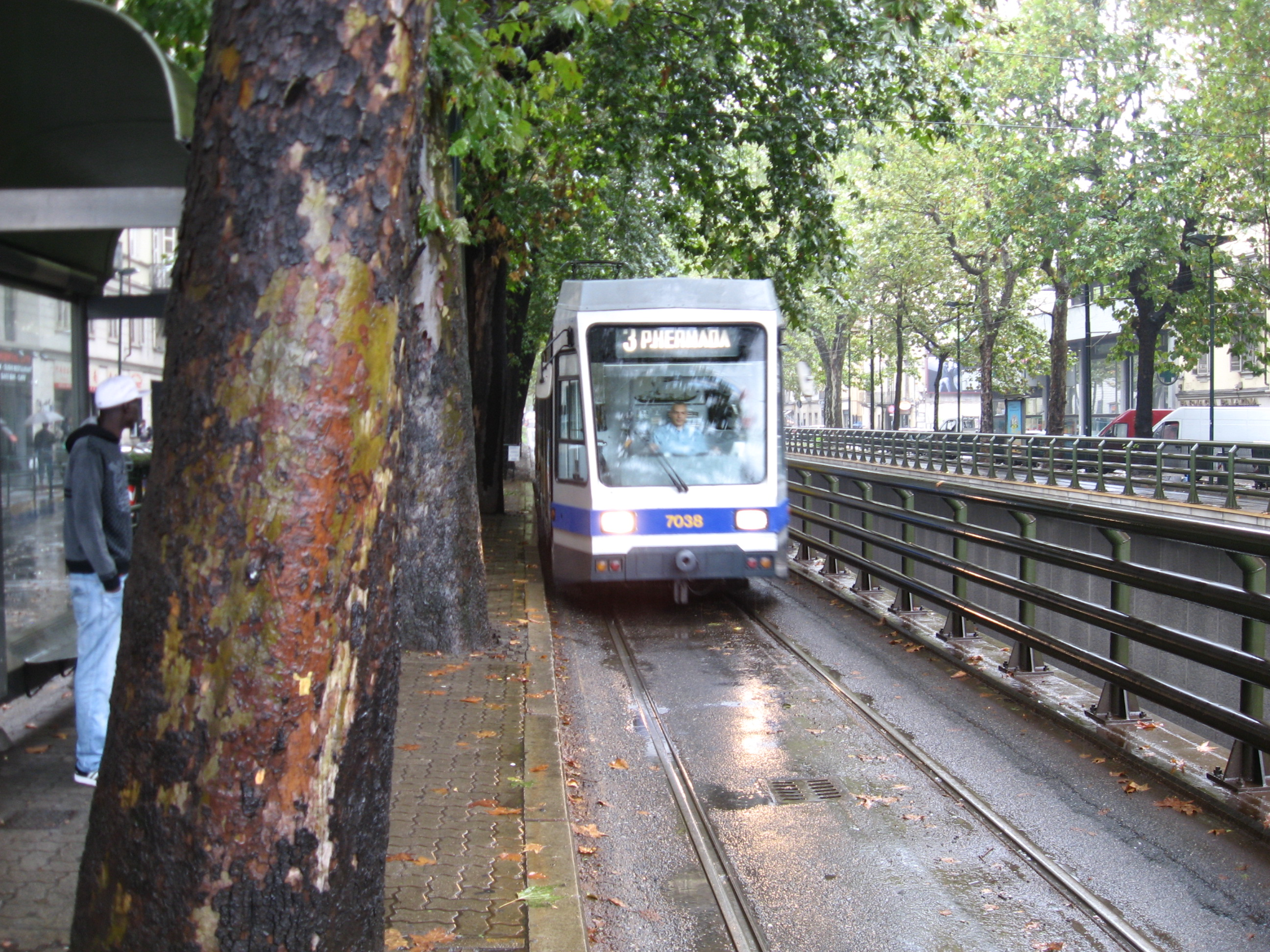
- Manufacturer: Fiat Ferroviaria
- Constructed: 1983–1986
- Number built: 51
- Fleet numbers: 7000–7050
- Capacity: 56 (Seated); 234 (Standing)

Specifications
- Train length: 28,226 mm (92 ft 7.3 in)
- Width: 2,500 mm (8 ft 2 in)
- Height: 3,200 mm (10 ft 6 in)
- Floor height: 850 mm (33 in)
- Low-floor: no
- Articulated sections: 1
- Wheelbase: 2,000 mm (79 in)
- Maximum speed: 75 km/h (47 mph)
- Weight: 43.3 t (95,460.2 lb)
- Steep gradient: 4/6
- Traction motors: RETAM BAS 5690/6
- Power output: electric
- Power supply: 600 V DC
- Electric system: overhead line
- Current collection: Pantograph
- Track gauge: 1,445 mm (4 ft 8 7/8 in)

The tramway Class 7000 are a series of articulated trams ordered by the ATM to be used on the Turin light rail network.

A quantity of 100 was ordered in 1981 from Fiat Ferroviaria (then in Savigliano), to be fitted with AEG electrical equipment, and the first car was delivered in February 1983.

However, the building of the five light rail lines originally planned was stopped after the opening of the first line (line 3) in 1987. As the 7000s could not be used on the traditional tram lines because of their dimensions and weight, the order was truncated at 51 units, and the other units were substituted by the 5000 series.

On December 7th 2013, line 3 was limited and didn't need bidirectional tram anymore, as lines 3 and 9 were the only ones 7000s could serve and on line 3 they weren't needed anymore and line 9 didn't need them either they weren't usable anymore. GTT tried to sold the remaining ones to other public transport companies, but no sale was made. Therefore, they were all withdrawn and demolished by 2016 due to their high maintenance costs, very limited access on the network and the lack of spare parts on the market.
