= Gruppo Torinese Trasporti =

Public benefit corporation

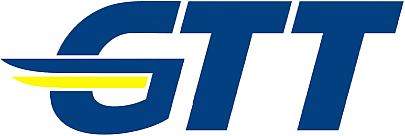

- Type: Public benefit corporation
- Founded: Turin, Piedmont - (Italy) (2003)
- Headquarters: Turin, Italy
- Area served: Metropolitan City of Turin Province of Alessandria; Province of Cuneo Province of Asti
- Key people: Paolo Golzio, chairman Giovanni Foti, executive director
- Products: Mass transit
- Revenue: €403 million (2005)
- Owner: Comune di Torino (in Italian)
- Number of employees: 5500 (2005)
- Divisions: Holding; Trasporto pubblico locale Infrastrutture ed ingegneria
- Website: www.gtt.to.it

The Gruppo Torinese Trasporti (GTT) is a public benefit corporation responsible for public transportation in the provinces of Alessandria, Cuneo, Asti and the Metropolitan City of Turin. It was created in 2003 from the merge of ATM (Azienda Torinese Mobilità) and SATTI (Società Torinese Trasporti Intercomunali). GTT is now wholly owned by the Turin City Hall.

GTT manages the urban and suburban public transport (the Turin tram system, with 10 lines and bus network of about 120 lines), the Turin Metro. The Turin metropolitan area is also served by about 70 extra-urban bus lines, reaching 220 different municipalities (comuni). GTT also manages minor services, such as the Sassi-Superga historical tramway, the Mole Antonelliana elevator, the City Sightseeing and also the touristic navigation on Po River.

== GTT Tramways ==
GTT owns ten tramway routes, one of which being the Sassi-Superga tramway. The historic route 7 where only heritage trams are operated by the Associazione Torinese Tram Storici, is not operated by GTT. The routes are:

- 3 Piazzale Vallette-Piazza Hermada
- 4 Via delle Querce-Strada del Drosso
- 7 Piazza Castello (circular route-historic)
- 9 Piazza Stampalia-Corso d'Azeglio
- 9/ Piazza Bernini-Juventus Stadium (operates only during Juventus FC games)
- 10 Corso Settembrini/Piazza Caio Mario-Piazza Statuto (tram services are currently limited due to improvement works)
- 13 Piazza Campanella-Piazza Gran Madre
- 15 Via Brissogne-Piazza Coriolano (Sassi)
- 16 CD Piazza Sabotino-Piazza Repubblica (Porta Palazzo) (clockwise circular route)
- 16 CS Piazza Sabotino-Piazza Repubblica (Porta Palazzo) (anticlockwise circular route)
- Sassi-Superga tramway

== Turin Metro ==
The line M1 of the Turin Metro, so far the system's only active line, connects the Fermi Station in Collegno to the piazza Bengasi district via Corso Francia, Porta Susa, and Porta Nuova, for a total of 23 stops.

== GTT Bus Routes ==
GTT operates various bus routes in Turin, Moncalieri and the nearby suburbs, alongside the urban routes of the small town of Ivrea. Some routes are managed by GTT directly, while others are operated on a concessionary base by other operators such as Miccolis; Bus Company, SADEM by Arriva; Giachino; and Cavourese.

=== Urban and Suburban Bus Routes in Turin ===
- 2 Piazza Sofia - Via Corradino
- 5 Piazza dalla Chiesa (Orbassano) - Piazza Arbarello
- 5/ (Operates only from Monday to Friday during Cimitero Parco's opening hours) Via Bertani (Cimitero Parco) - Piazza Arbarello
- 6 Piazza Hermada-Piazza Carlo Felice
- 8 Via Mezzaluna (San Mauro) - Corso Bolzano
- 10N Via Massari - Piazza XVIII Dicembre
- 11 Via Leopardi (Venaria Reale) - Corso Stati Uniti
- 12 Via Allason (Poste) - Corso Vittorio Emanuele II
- 13+ Piazza Statuto - Piazza Vittorio Veneto
- 14 Via Amendola (Nichelino) - Piazza Solferino
- 17 Ospedale di Rivoli - Via Ventimiglia
- 17/ (Weekdays only) Via Crea (Grugliasco) - Via Ventimiglia
- 18 Piazza Sofia - Piazzale Caio Mario
- 19 Corso Cadore - Corso Bolzano
- 19N (Operates only during Cimitero Monumentale's opening hours) Largo Donatori di Sangue - Cimitero Monumentale
- 20 (Weekdays route) Via Paganini (Settimo Torinese) / Via Piave (Settimo Torinese) - Corso Vercelli (parcheggio Stura)
- 20 (Sunday and public holidays route) Via Paganini (Settimo Torinese) / Via Piave (Settimo Torinese) - Piazza Mochino (San Mauro)
- 22 (Special route for Iveco workers) Corso Sebastopoli - Strada Cascinette
- 24 (Special route for Iveco workers) Via Vigliani - Strada Cascinette
- 25 (Special route for Iveco workers) Via Lombardia (Settimo Torinese) - Lungo Stura Lazio
- 26 (Monday to Friday day route) Corso Vercelli (Park Stura) - Via Italia (Borgaro Torinese)
- 26 (Evening, Saturday, Sunday and public holidays route) Corso Vercelli (Park Stura) - Strada del Villaretto
- 27 Via Anglesio - Via Bertola
- 29 Piazzale Vallette - Piazza Solferino
- 30 Via Gozzano (Chieri) - Corso San Maurizio
- 32 Piazza Robotti (Alpignano) - Corso Tassoni
- 33 (Weekdays route) Corso Papa Giovanni XXIII (Collegno) - Corso Vittorio Emanuele II
- 33 (Sunday and public holidays route) Corso Papa Giovanni XXIII (Collegno) - Piazzale Adua
- 34 (Weekdays only) Cimitero Parco (during opening hours) / Strada Torino (Beinasco) - Via Ventimiglia
- 35 Via Amendola (Nichelino) - Via Artom
- 35N Via Verdi (Candiolo) - Villaggio Dega (Vinovo) - Via Trento (Nichelino)
- 36 Piazza Martiri della Libertà (Rivoli) - Piazza Massaua
- 36N Ospedale di Rivoli - Castello di Rivoli / Stazione Alpignano - Rivoli / Bruere-Tetti Neirotti
- 38 (Weekdays route) Piazzale Caio Mario - Via Minghetti (Collegno)
- 38 (Sunday and public holidays route) Corso Maroncelli - Via Minghetti (Collegno)
- 38S (Operates only from Monday to Friday during school opening and closing times) Via De Amicis - Via Crea (Grugliasco)
- 39 Piazza Baden Baden (Moncalieri) - Piazzale Caio Mario
- 40 (Weekdays only) Piazzale Caio Mario - Piazza Massaua
- 41 Via Pannunzio (Stazione Lingotto)-Via Orbassano (Borgaretto)
- 42 Via Marsigli - Via Ventimiglia
- 43 Via Gorizia (Rivalta) - Via Goito (Moncalieri)
- 44 Via Portalupi (Collegno) - Via Don Borio (Grugliasco)
- 44S (Operates only from Monday to Friday during school opening and closing times) Via Portalupi (Collegno) - Via Crea (Grugliasco) - Piazza Omero
- 45 (Weekdays route) Piazza Carducci (Santena) - Piazza Carducci
- 45 (Sunday and public holidays route) Piazza Carducci (Santena) - Corso Maroncelli
- 45/ (Weekdays only) Piazza Santi Cosma e Damiano (Santena) - Piazza Carducci
- 46 Via Lombardore (Leinì) - Corso Bolzano
- 47 Piazza Freguglia - Piazza Carducci
- 48 Ospedale San Luigi (Orbassano) - Via Orbassano (Borgaretto)
- 49 Via Lombardia (Settimo Torinese) - Corso Bolzano
- 50 (Weekdays route) Via delle Querce - Ospedale San Giovanni Bosco
- 50 (Sunday and public holidays route) Via delle Querce - Corso XI Febbraio
- 51 (Weekdays only) Corso Vercelli (Park Stura) - Corso Bolzano
- 52 (Weekdays only) Via Scialoja - Piazzale Adua
- 53 (Weekdays only) Ospedale San Vincenzo - Corso San Maurizio
- 54 (Weekdays route) Corso Gabetti - Strada del Mainero
- 54 (Sunday and public holidays route) Piazzale Adua - Strada Alta di Mongreno
- 55 Via Don Borio (Grugliasco) - Corso Farini
- 56 Corso Tirreno (Grugliasco) - Largo Tabacchi
- 58 (Weekdays only) Via Allason (Poste) - Via Bertola
- 58/ Via Grosso - Via Bertola
- 59 Piazza Oropa (Druento) - Piazza Solferino
- 59/ (Weekdays only) Piazzale Vallette - Piazza Solferino
- 60 Via Paris - Corso Inghilterra
- 61 Via Mezzaluna (San Mauro) - Corso Vittorio Emanuele II
- 62 Piazza Sofia - Piazzale Caio Mario
- 63 Via Negarville - Piazza Solferino
- 63/ Piazzale Caio Mario - Stazione Lingotto
- 64 Via Napoli (Grugliasco) - Corso Vittorio Emanuele II
- 65 Via Servais - Piazza Bernini
- 66 (Weekdays only) Via Crea (Grugliasco) - Corso Farini
- 67 (Weekdays route) Piazza Marconi (Moncalieri) - Piazza Arbarello
- 67 (Sunday and public holidays route) Piazza Marconi (Moncalieri) - Via Scialoja
- 68 Via Cafasso - Via Frejus
- 68+ Corso Tortona - Piazza Carlo Felice
- 69 Via Italia (Borgaro Torinese) - Via Fossata
- 70 Piazza Failla (Moncalieri) - Corso San Maurizio
- 71 Via Farinelli - Corso Bolzano
- 72 Corso Machiavelli (Venaria Reale) - Corso Bolzano
- 72/ (Weekdays only) Corso Machiavelli (Venaria Reale) - Corso Bolzano
- 73 Via Bonsignore - Piazza Zara
- 74 Via Gorini - Via Ventimiglia
- 75 Piazzale Vallette - Largo Tabacchi
- 76 Via Olevano (Grugliasco) - Viale Partigiani (Collegno)
- 77 (Weekdays only) Via Sandre (Venaria Reale) - Corso Cadore
- 78 (Weekdays only) Largo Casale - Strada Alta di Mongreno
- 79/ (Weekdays only, replacement and additional service of the Sassi-Superga tramway) Strada Comunale di Superga - Basilica di Superga - Baldissero Torinese (only from 6:00 A.M. to 9:00 A.M. and from 1:00 P.M. to 8 P.M.)
- 80 (Weekdays only) Piazza Caduti per la Libertà (Moncalieri) - Strada Moncalvo
- 81 (Weekdays only) Via delle Primule (Moncalieri) - Corso Maroncelli
- 82 Piazza Caduti per la Libertà (Moncalieri)-Strada Carpice (Moncalieri)
- 83 Via Goito - Movicentro (Trofarello) - Strada Bauducchi (Moncalieri) - Villastellone
- 84 (Weekdays only) Via Corradino - Strada Carpice (Moncalieri)
- 86/ (Operates only from Monday to Friday during school opening and closing times) Via Di Vittorio (Venaria Reale) - Via Claviere (Pianezza)
- 88 (Operates only from Monday to Friday during school opening and closing times) Piazza Cattaneo - Via Crea (Grugliasco)
- 89 (Operates only from Monday to Friday during school opening and closing times) Via Moriondo (Rivalta) - Via Crea (Grugliasco)
- 89/ (Operates only from Monday to Friday during school opening and closing times) Via Portalupi (Collegno) - Via Crea (Grugliasco)
- 90 (Special route for Stellantis workers) Via delle Querce - Via Biscaretti
- 91 (Special route for Stellantis workers) Via della Cella - Piazzale Caio Mario
- 92 (Special route for Stellantis workers) Ospedale Giovanni Bosco - Piazzale Caio Mario
- 93/ (Special route for Stellantis workers) Piazza Mochino (San Mauro) - Corso Tazzoli
- 94 (Special route for Stellantis workers) Piazza Statuto - Via Biscaretti
- 95 (Special route for Stellantis workers) Stazione Lingotto - Corso Tazzoli - Via Rivalta (Grugliasco)
- 95/ (Special route for Stellantis workers) Stazione Lingotto - Via Anselmetti - Via Biscaretti - Via Faccioli
- 96 (Special route for Stellantis workers) Via Amendola (Nichelino) - Corso Tazzoli
- 97 (Special route for Stellantis workers) Piazza Martiri della Libertà (Rivoli) - Via Biscaretti
- 98 (Special route for Stellantis workers) Via Portalupi (Collegno) - Via Biscaretti
- 99 (Special route for Stellantis workers) Piazza Carducci (Santena) - Via Plava
- M1S (Subway replacement service, operates only from Sunday to Thursday when the subway is closed, but the urban network is active) Corso Maroncelli - Via De Amicis (Fermi, M1 Collegno)
- Porta Nuova Express (Subway replacement service, operates only from Monday to Friday, from 7:00 A.M. to 9:30 A.M.)
- 102 Navetta Cimitero Parco
- CP1 Via De Amicis (Fermi, M1 Collegno) - Via Musinè (Pianezza)
- Rivoli Express Turin Piazza Castello - Stazione Porta Susa - Castello di Rivoli
- Venaria Express Turin - Reggia di Venaria Reale
- SE1 Park Stura - Via Lombardia (Settimo Torinese)
- SE2 (Weekdays only) Park Stura - Via Lombardia (Settimo Torinese)
- VE1 Viale Giordano Bruno (Venaria Cimitero) - Via Monte Ortigara
- VE2 (Weekdays only) Ospedale Nuovo Venaria - Via Iseppon
- Star 1 Corso Farini - Via Nino Bixio
- Star 2 Corso D'Azeglio - Corso Bolzano
- 1S (Weekdays only) Via Lombardia (Settimo Torinese) - Via Einaudi (Settimo Torinese)
- LS1 (Operates only on weekdays during school opening and closing times) Leinì - Settimo Torinese
- 132 (Operates only from Monday to Friday) Piazza Robotti (Alpignano) - Via De Amicis (Collegno)
- 159A (Operates only from Monday to Friday during school opening and closing times) Piazza Stampalia - Via Piave (Pianezza)
- 159B (Operates only from Monday to Friday during school opening and closing times) Piazza Stampalia - Via Gramsci (Pianezza)

=== Night bus (Night Buster) ===
- W1 ARANCIONE Piazza Vittorio Veneto - Piazza Massaua - Alpignano (summer only)
- N4 ROSSA Piazza Vittorio Veneto - Via delle Querce - Volpiano (only in summer)
- N4/ ROSSA (Summer route) Piazza Vittorio Veneto - Via delle Querce
- S4 AZZURRA Piazza Vittorio Veneto - Piazzale Caio Mario
- S5 VIOLA Piazza Vittorio Veneto - Piazza Cattaneo - Orbassano (summer only)
- S5/ VIOLA (Summer route) Piazza Vittorio Veneto - Rivalta di Torino
- N8 ORO Piazza Vittorio Veneto - Piazza Sofia - Settimo Torinese (summer only)
- N10 GIALLA Piazza Vittorio Veneto - Via Massari - Caselle Torinese (summer only)
- W15 ROSA Piazza Vittorio Veneto - Via Brissogne - Collegno (summer only)
- W15/ ROSA (Summer route) Piazza Vittorio Veneto - Via Brissogne
- S18 BLU Piazza Vittorio Veneto - Via Artom - Candiolo (summer only)
- S18/ BLU (Summer route) Piazza Vittorio Veneto - Vinovo
- S45 MARRONE (Summer route) Piazza Vittorio Veneto - Chieri
- S45/ MARRONE (Summer route) Piazza Vittorio Veneto - Santena
- W60 ARGENTO Piazza Vittorio Veneto - Piazza Manno - Pianezza (summer only)
- E68 VERDE Piazza Vittorio Veneto - Via Cafasso - Gassino Torinese (summer only)
- E68/ VERDE (Summer route) Piazza Vittorio Veneto - Chieri

=== Urban Routes in Ivrea ===
- 1 Bellavista - Ivrea FS - Ivrea (Piazza Freguglia) - Bollengo - Sant'Anna
- 1/ (Weekdays route) San Bernardo - Ivrea FS - Ivrea (Piazza Freguglia) - Albiano
- 1/ (Sunday and public holidays route) San Bernardo - Bellavista - Ivrea FS - Ivrea (Piazza Freguglia) - Albiano / Bollengo
- 2 Burolo / Chiaverano - Ivrea (Piazza Freguglia) - Ivrea Porta Aosta - Samone
- 2/ (Weekdays route) Burolo / Chiaverano - Ivrea (Piazza Freguglia) - Ivrea Porta Aosta - Samone
- 2/ (Sunday and public holidays route) Burolo / Chiaverano - Ivrea (Piazza Freguglia) - Ivrea Porta Aosta - Samone / Pavone
- 3 San Germano - Borgofranco - Ivrea Porta Aosta - Banchette - Pavone / Ivrea FS
- 4 Bellavista - Ivrea FS - Ivrea Movicentro - Ivrea (Piazza Freguglia) - Quartiere San Giovanni
- 5 Quassolo / Lessolo - Salerano - Banchette - Ivrea FS - Ivrea (Piazza Freguglia) - Ivrea Via Chabod / Bacciana / Bienca
- 6 Ivrea (Via Saudino) - Ivrea (Piazza Freguglia) - Ivrea FS - Samone - Colleretto Giacosa - Loranzè
- 6/ Ivrea (Via Saudino) - Ivrea (Piazza Freguglia) - Ivrea FS - Samone - Colleretto Giacosa - Loranzè

=== Urban Routes in Chieri, Nichelino, Orbassano and Rivalta ===
- 1C Via Fratelli Cervi - Via Rocchette
- 2C (Weekdays only) Piazza Rossi (Pessione) - Via Vittorio Emanuele II
- 1N Piazza Parco della Rimembranza - Via XXV Aprile
- OB1 (Weekdays only) Ospedale San Luigi - Via Volturno
- RV2 (Weekdays only) Via Vicuna - Via Griva

=== Interurban Routes ===
- 1068 Collegno - Condove
- 1085 Turin - Fiat Rivalta
- 1086 Rivoli - Trana - Giaveno
- 1087 Rivoli - Avigliana - Ferriera
- 1091 Collegno - Rubiana
- 1099 Chiusa San Michele - Condove
- 1128 Borgata Adrit - San Giorio - Bussoleno
- 1224 Bussoleno - Avigliana - Rivoli
- 1432 None - Alpignano
- 1435 Turin - C.A.A.T. - SITO
- 1442 Nichelino - Torino - Ferriera (Teksid)
- 1510 Turin - Orbassano - Cumiana / Cumiana - Pinerolo
- 1511 Turin - Orbassano - Giaveno / Giaveno - Piossasco
- 2009 Autolinea delle Langhe (Dir. Grinzane-Sinio)
- 2014 Turin - Poirino - Alba
- 2016 Canale - Sommariva - Racconigi
- 2027 Canale - San Damiano - Asti
- 2073 Borgo Aje - Cambiano - Santena - Villastellone - Carmagnola
- 2075 Trofarello - Fiat Rivalta
- 2172 Monforte - Dogliani
- 2183 Canale - Fossano
- 2354 Carignano - Santena - Cambiano
- 3006 Turin - Settimo - Vallecerrina - Casale
- 3023 Vallecerrina - Asti
- 3092 Turin - Forno / San Maurizio - Forno
- 3096 Gassino - Sciolze
- 3105 Chivasso - Asti
- 3106 Crescentino - Chivasso - Torino FCA
- 3107 Turin - Settimo - Gassino - Chivasso - Piovà Massaia
- 3121 Castagneto Po - Chivasso
- 3131 Turin - Lombardore - Rivarolo
- 3132 Rivarolo - Castellamonte
- 3133 Turin - Ivrea
- 3165 Turin - Germagnano
- 3166 Turin - Volpiano - San Benigno
- 3316 Chivasso F.S. - Rondissone
- 3321 Montalenghe - Foglizzo - Chivasso
- 3329 Ciriè - Turin (Fiat Mirafiori)
- 3331 Verrua Savoia - Crescentino - Brusasco
- 3382 Turin (Corso Marche) - Caselle ALENIA
- 3428 School Service Rivarossa
- 3429 School Service San Benigno - Volpiano - Chivasso
- 3502 School Service San Maurizio - Castellamonte
- 3545 Carignano - Turin - Chivasso (P.I.Chi)
- 3950 School Service Verolengo
- 3971 Turin Fossata Rebaudengo FS - Ceres
- 4108 Ivrea - Vische - Chivasso
- 4147 Vialfrè - Castellamonte
- 4151 Cossano - Ivrea
- 4152 Silva - Vialfrè - Ivrea
- 4156 Andrate - Ivrea
- 4512 Ivrea - Castellamonte - Valchiusella
- 4546 Albiano - Vestignè (School Service)
- 5095 Forno - Rivarolo
- 5134 Forno - Busano - Cuorgnè
- 5135 Rivarolo - San Benigno - Turin
- 5137 Rivarolo - Pont - Ceresole
- 5140 Pont - Valprato Soana
- 5141 Pont - Frassinetto
- 5143 Cuorgnè - Ivrea
- 5145 Rivarolo - Ivrea
- 5150 Castelnuovo Nigra - Cuorgnè Centro
- 5318 Castelnuovo Nigra - Castellamonte - Scarmagno
- 5322 Cuorgnè - Alpette
- 5379 School Service Ciriè - Rivarolo
- MEOR Orbassano

== See also ==
- Superga Rack Railway
- Turin Metro
- Turin metropolitan railway service
