= Bassi Department =

Coordinates: 13.3333°N 2.2333°W

Bassi
- Department
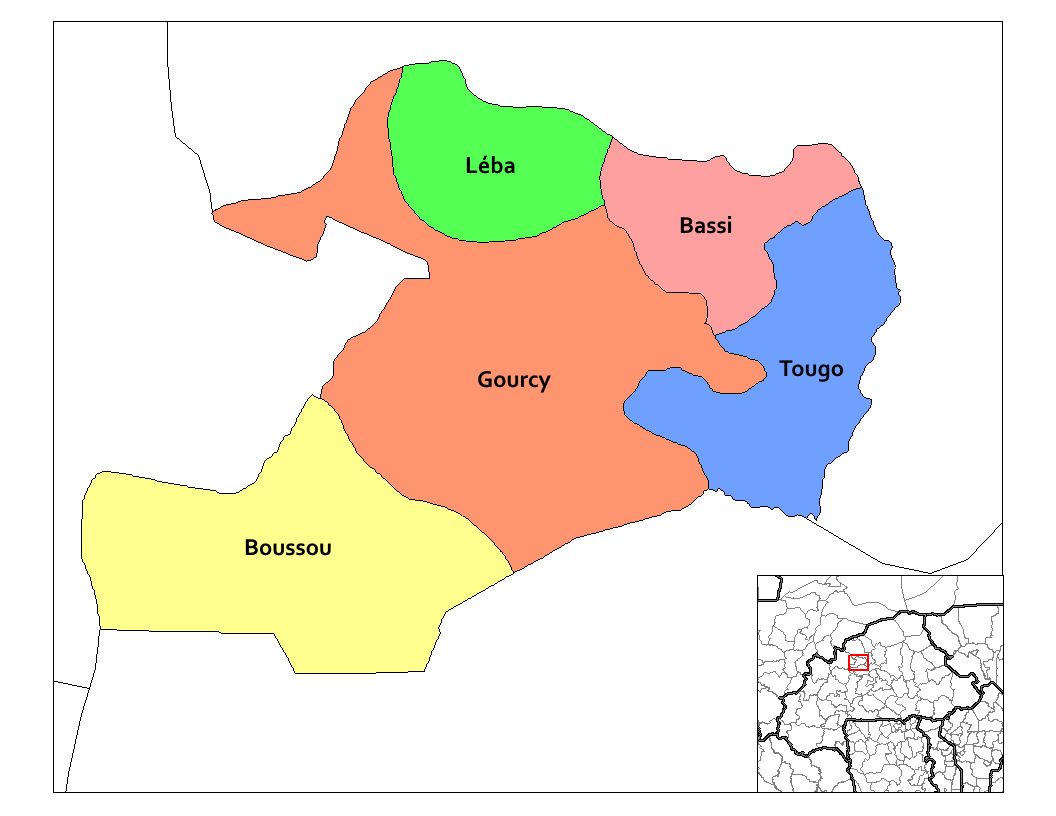
- Bassi Department location in the province
- Country: Burkina Faso
- Province: Zondoma Province

Area
  - Total: 75.6 sq mi (195.9 km^{2})

Population (2019 census)
  - Total: 34,424
  - Density: 455.1/sq mi (175.7/km^{2})
- Time zone: UTC+0 (GMT 0)

Bassi is a department or commune of Zondoma Province in western Burkina Faso. Its capital lies at the town of Bassi.
