= Trams in Turin =

Tram system in Turin, Italy

Turin tramway network
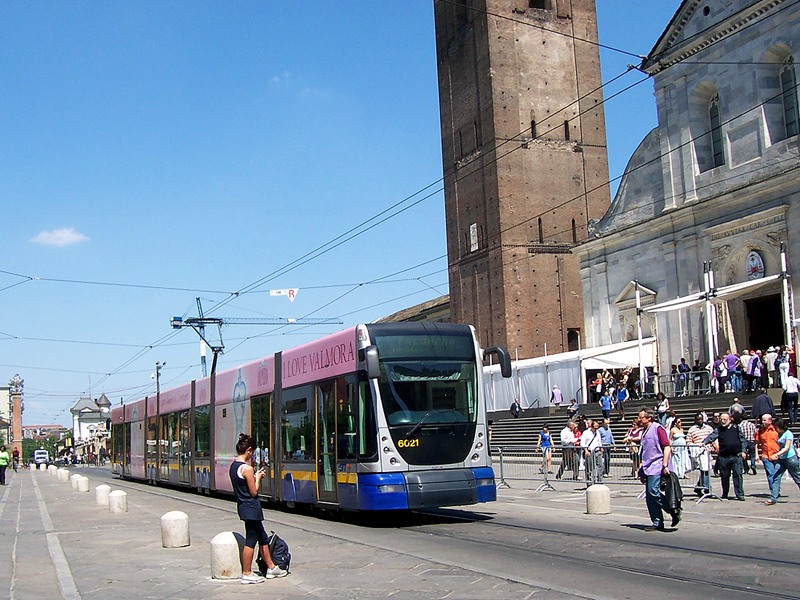
- Turin tram ATM 6000

Operation
- Locale: Turin, Piedmont, Italy

Statistics
Horsecar era: 1871–ca. 1900
- Track gauge: 1,445 mm (4 ft 8 7/8 in)
- Propulsion system: Horse
Electric era: since 1893
- Routes: 10 (on 9 lines)
- Operator: GTT
- Track gauge: 1,445 mm (4 ft 8 7/8 in)
- Propulsion system: Electric
- Electrification: 600 V DC parallel overhead lines
- Track length (total): 91 km (57 mi)
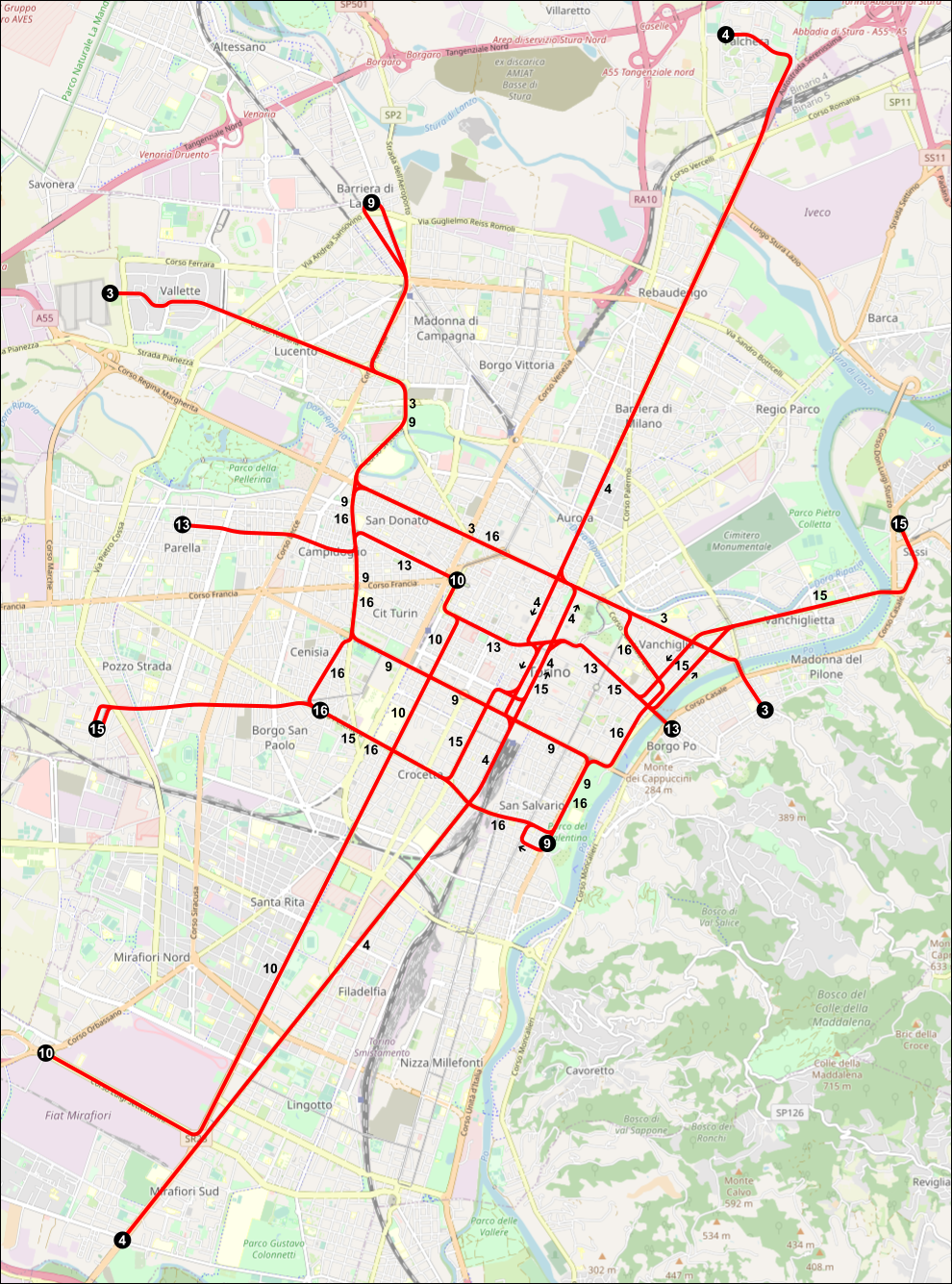
- Website: https://web.archive.org/web/20110716141104/http://www.comune.torino.it/gtt/en/ GTT (in English)

The Turin tramway network (Italian: Rete tranviaria di Torino) is an important part, along with the Turin Metro, of the public transport network of the city and comune of Turin, in the Piedmont region, northwest Italy.

In operation since 1871, the network is about 91 km (57 mi) long, and comprises 10 lines.

== The network ==
=== Urban lines ===
The Turin tramway network has 10 lines (for a total of 11 routes):

- 3 Piazza Hermada - Piazzale Vallette (9,1 km)
- 4 Strada del Drosso - Via delle Querce (17,8 km)
- 7 storica Piazza Castello (circular) (6,9 km) (operated solely by heritage trams)
- 9 Piazza Stampalia - Corso Massimo D'Azeglio (9,4 km)
- 9/ Piazza Bernini - Juventus Stadium (5,5 km)
- 10 Piazza Statuto / Piazza Caio Mario- Corso Settembrini (limited operations due to track work)
- 13 Piazza Campanella - Piazza Gran Madre (6,7 km)
- 15 Via Brissogne - Piazza Coriolano (11,5 km)
- 16 CS Piazza Sabotino (circular) (12 km)
- 16 CD Piazza Sabotino (circular) (12 km)
- Sassi-Superga Tramway Piazza Gustavo Modena - Basilica di Superga (3,1 km)

=== Light rail ===
Of the urban lines, lines 3 and 9 were created as a light rail tram system in the 1980s. Today, line 3 is called a "fully protected" route, while line 9 is considered an ordinary tramway.

Line 4 has characteristics similar to line 3, although another type of tram vehicle is used. In any case, this line also includes long stretches of reserved sections to permit higher speeds.

On line 3, light rail vehicles of the series 7000 were used.

== Rolling stock ==
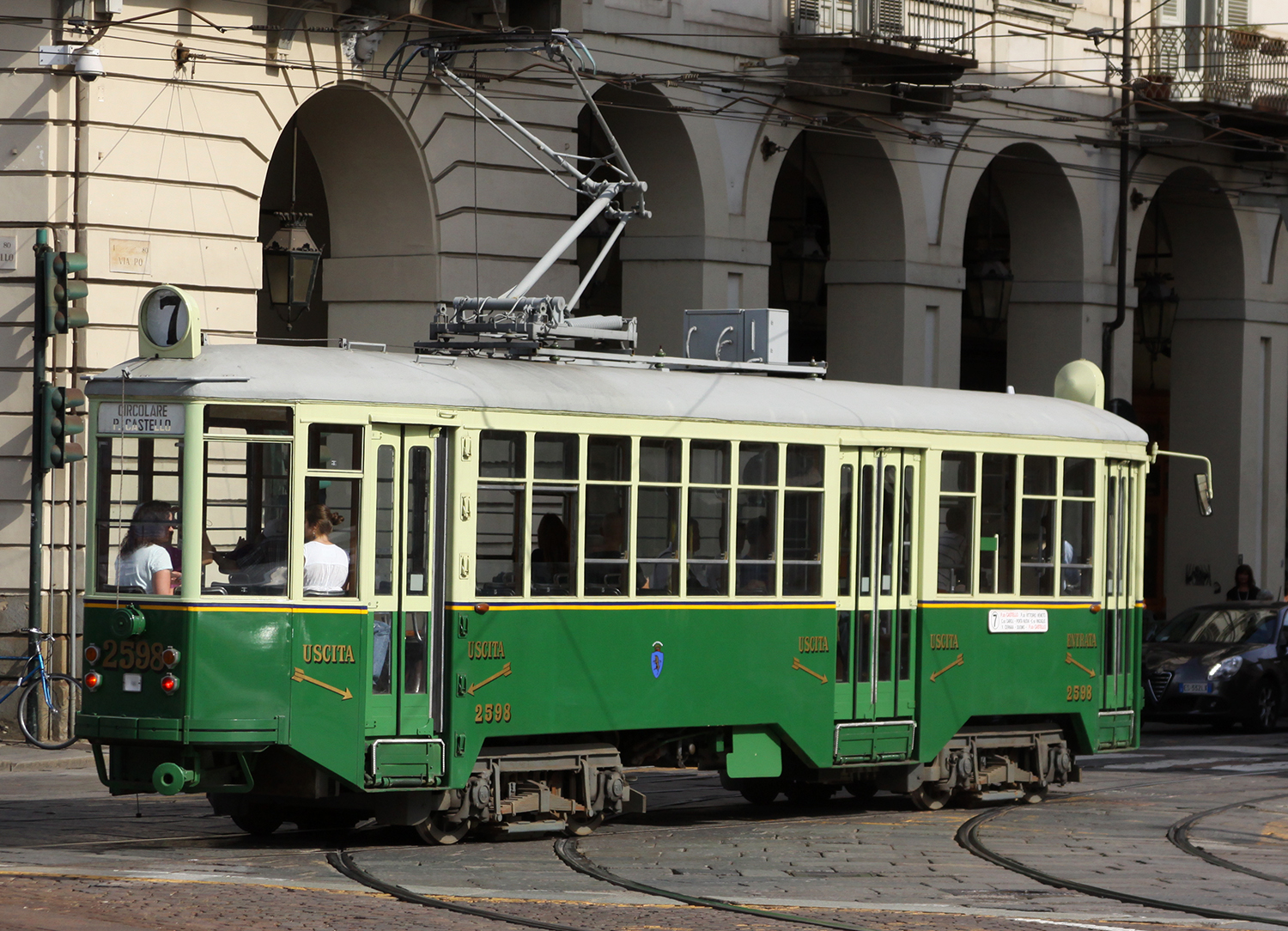
2500 series

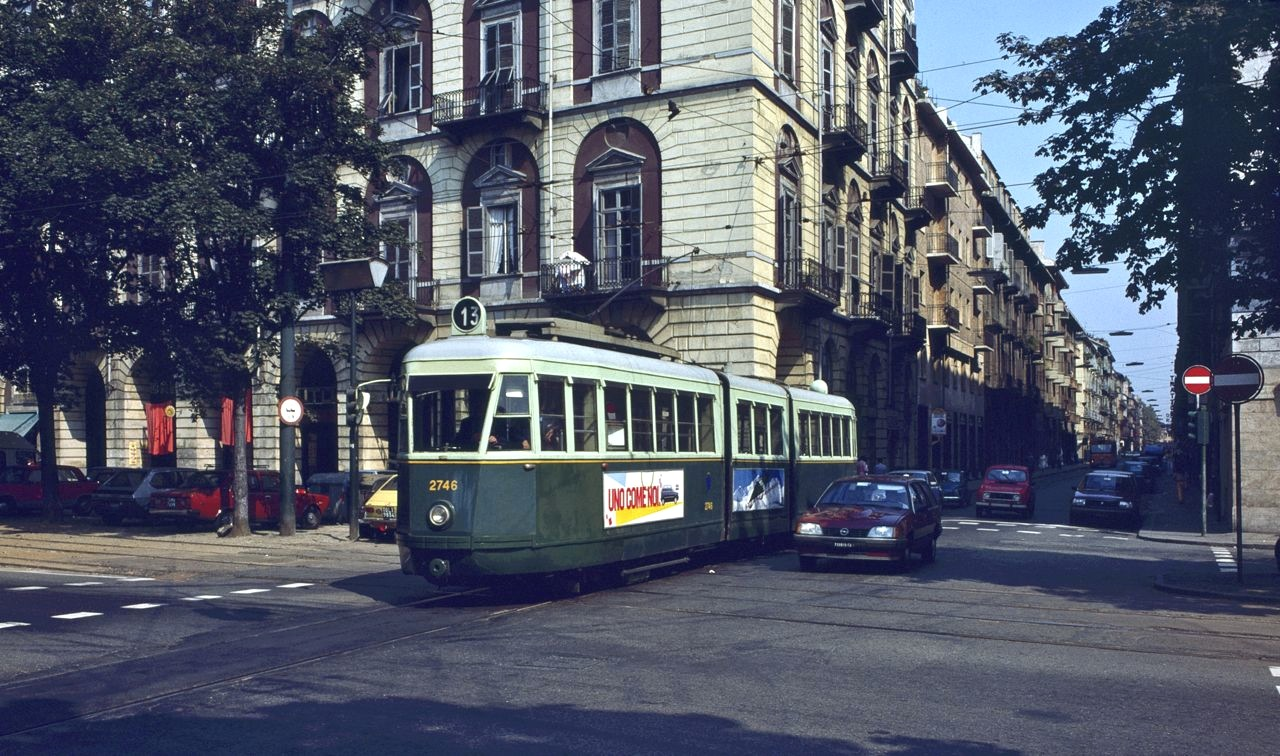
2700 series

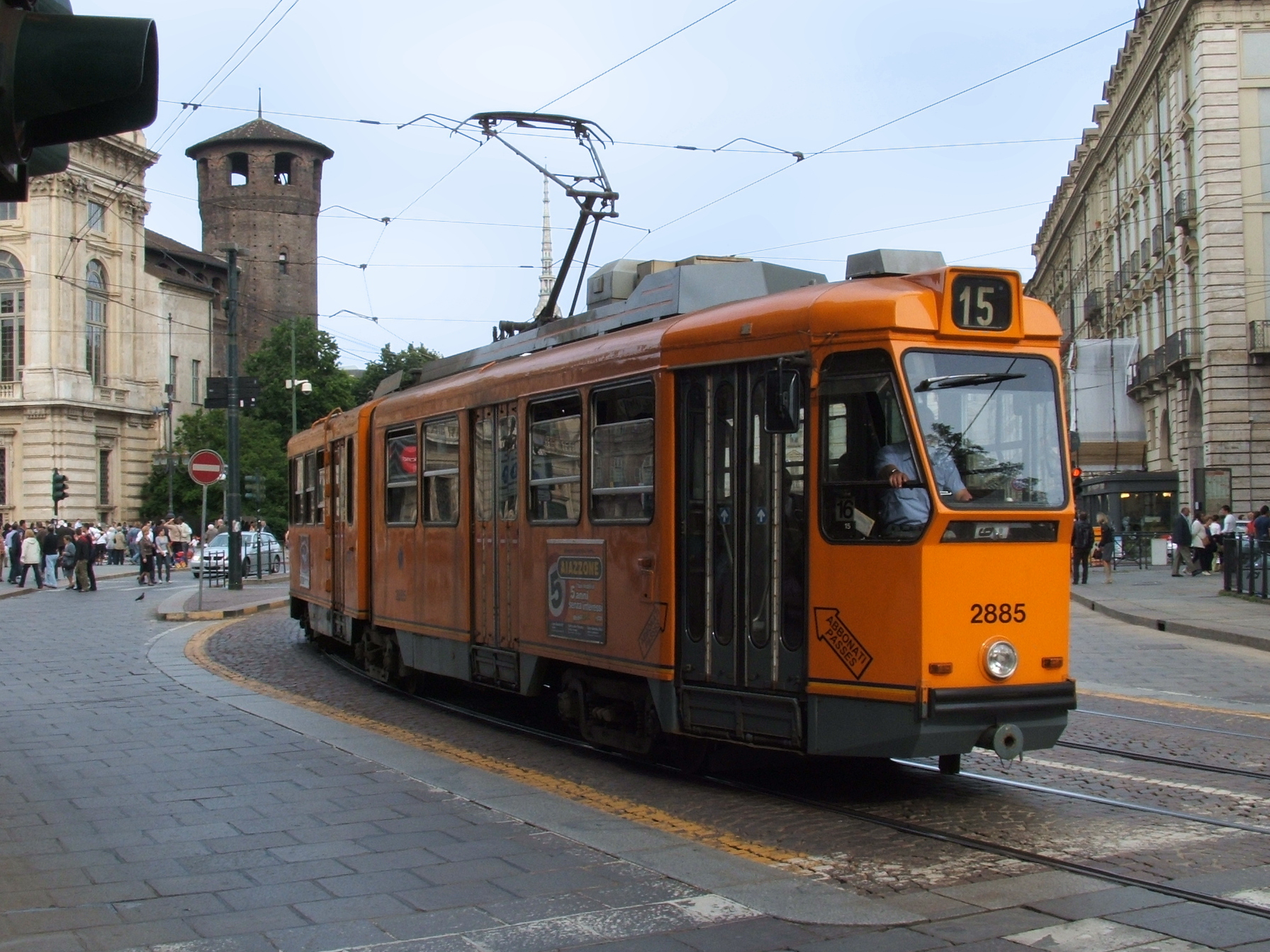
2800 series

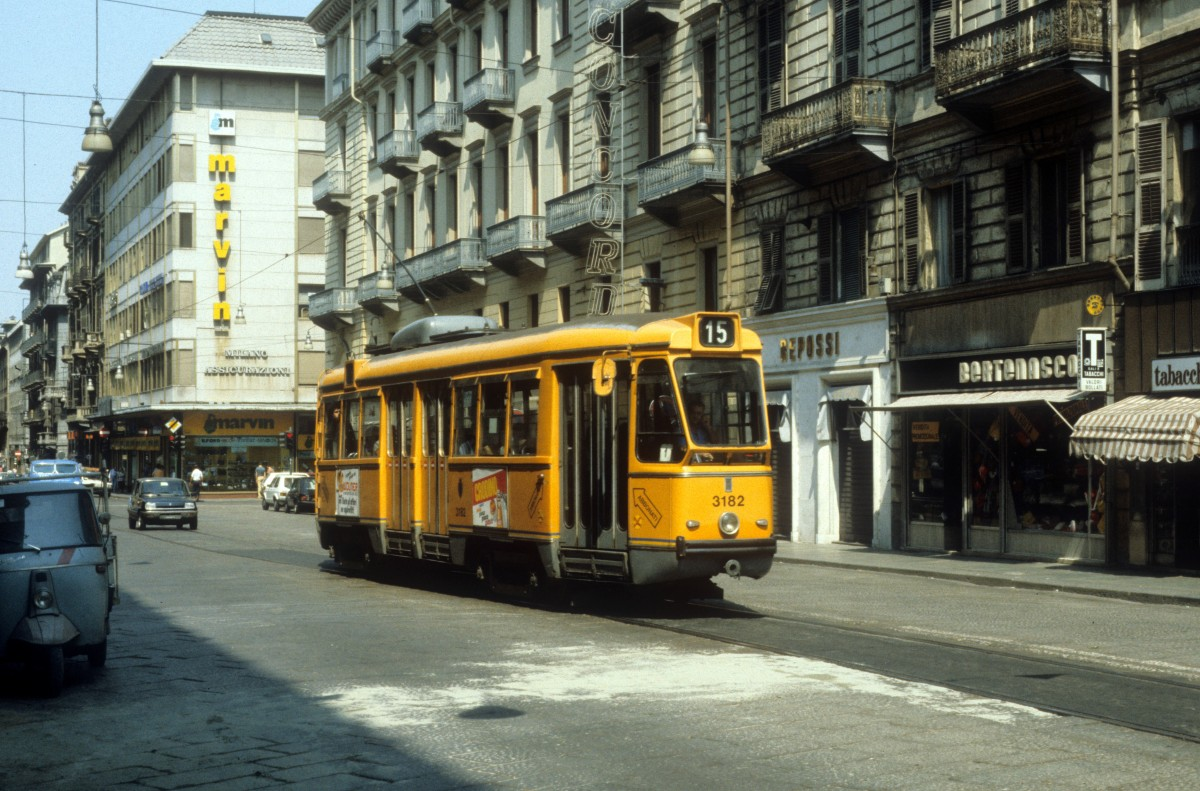
3100 series

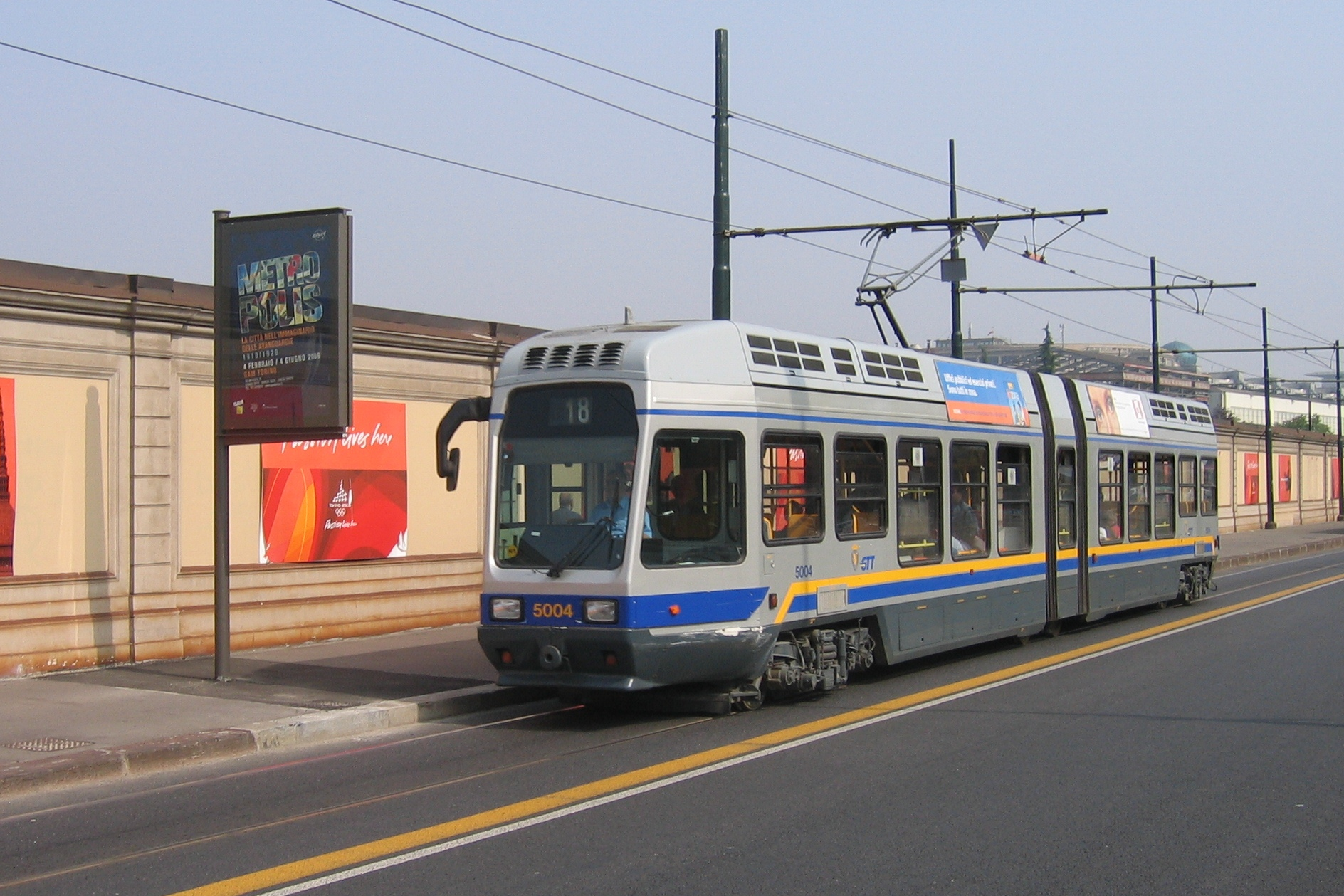
5000 series

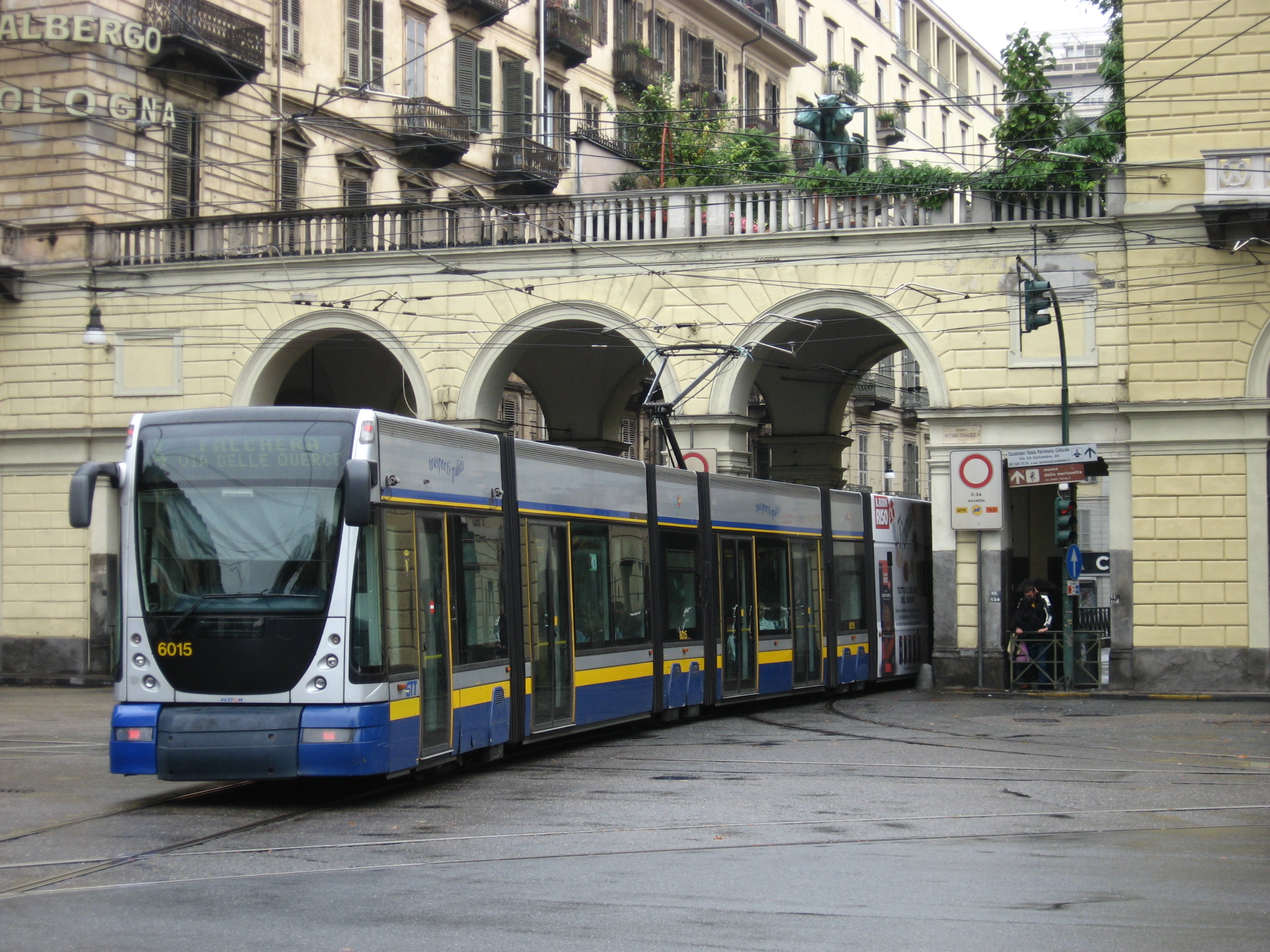
6000 series

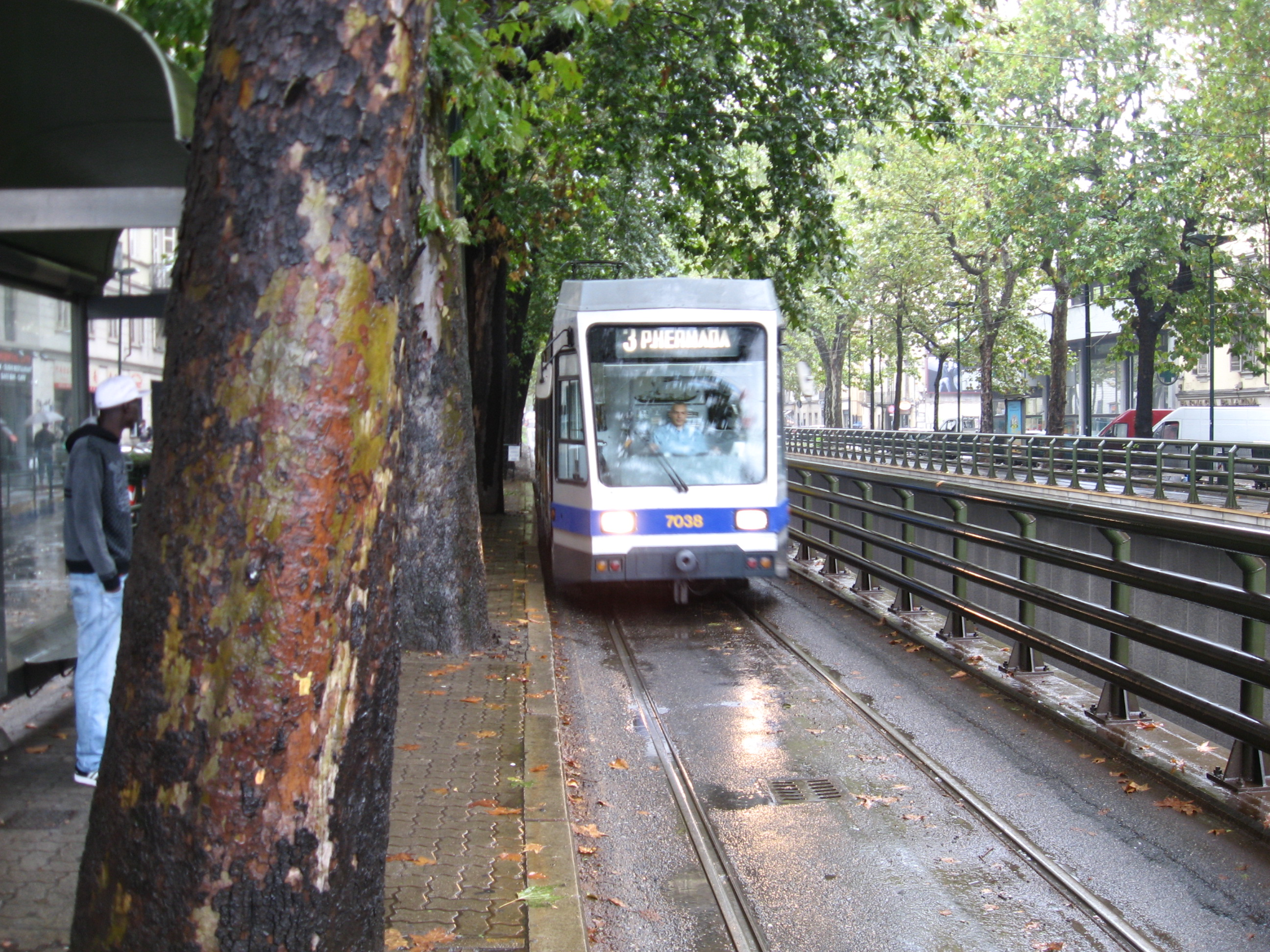
7000 series

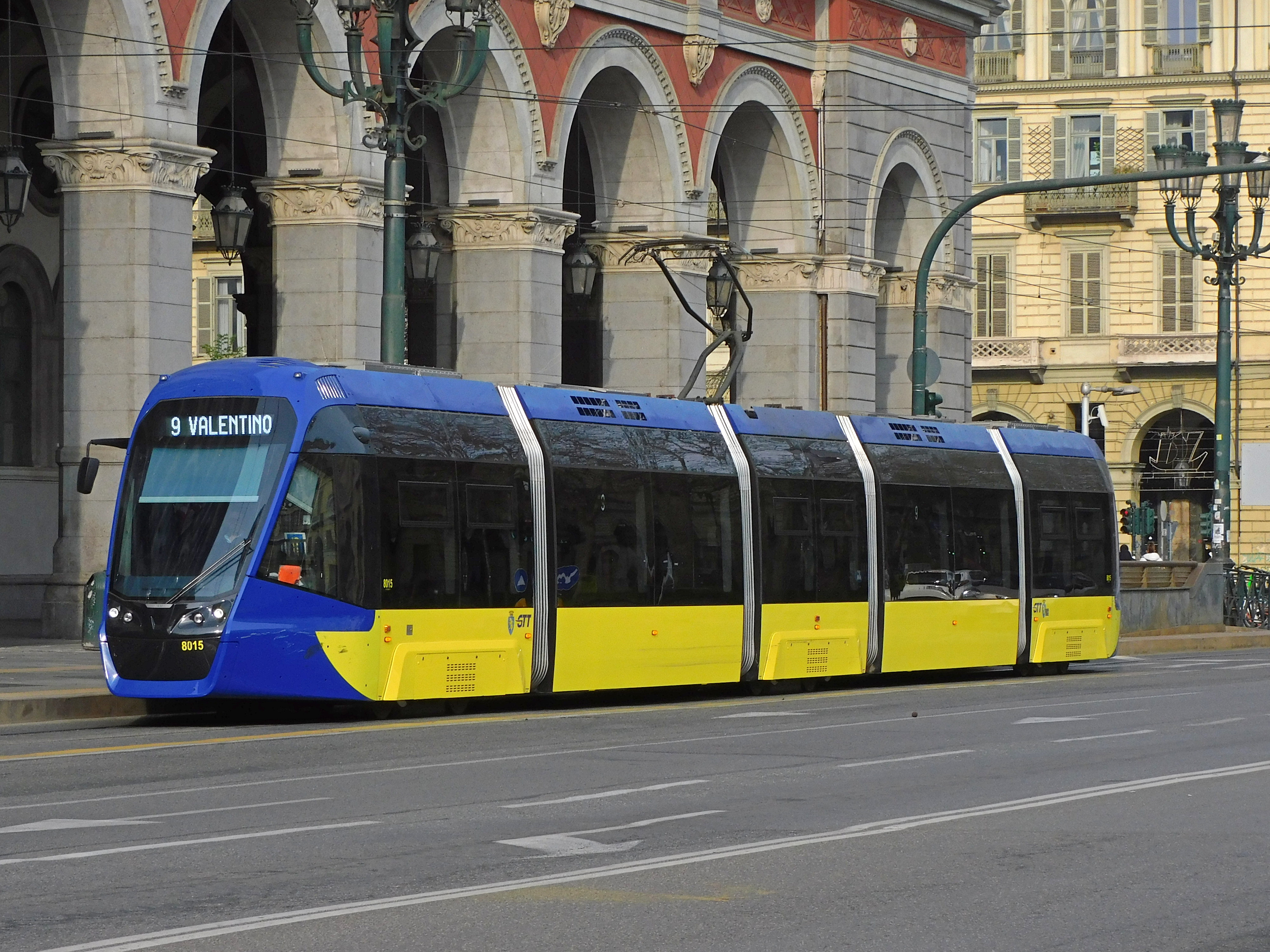
8000 series

== See also ==
- Turin Metro
- List of town tramway systems in Italy
- History of rail transport in Italy
- Rail transport in Italy

== Sources ==
- Brignole, Claudio; Schwandl, Robert (2010). Metros in Italien / Metros in Italy. Berlin: Robert Schwandl Verlag. ISBN 978-3-936573-22-0. (in German and English)
