= Grugliasco =

Grugliasco Grujasch (Piedmontese)
- Comune
- Comune di Grugliasco
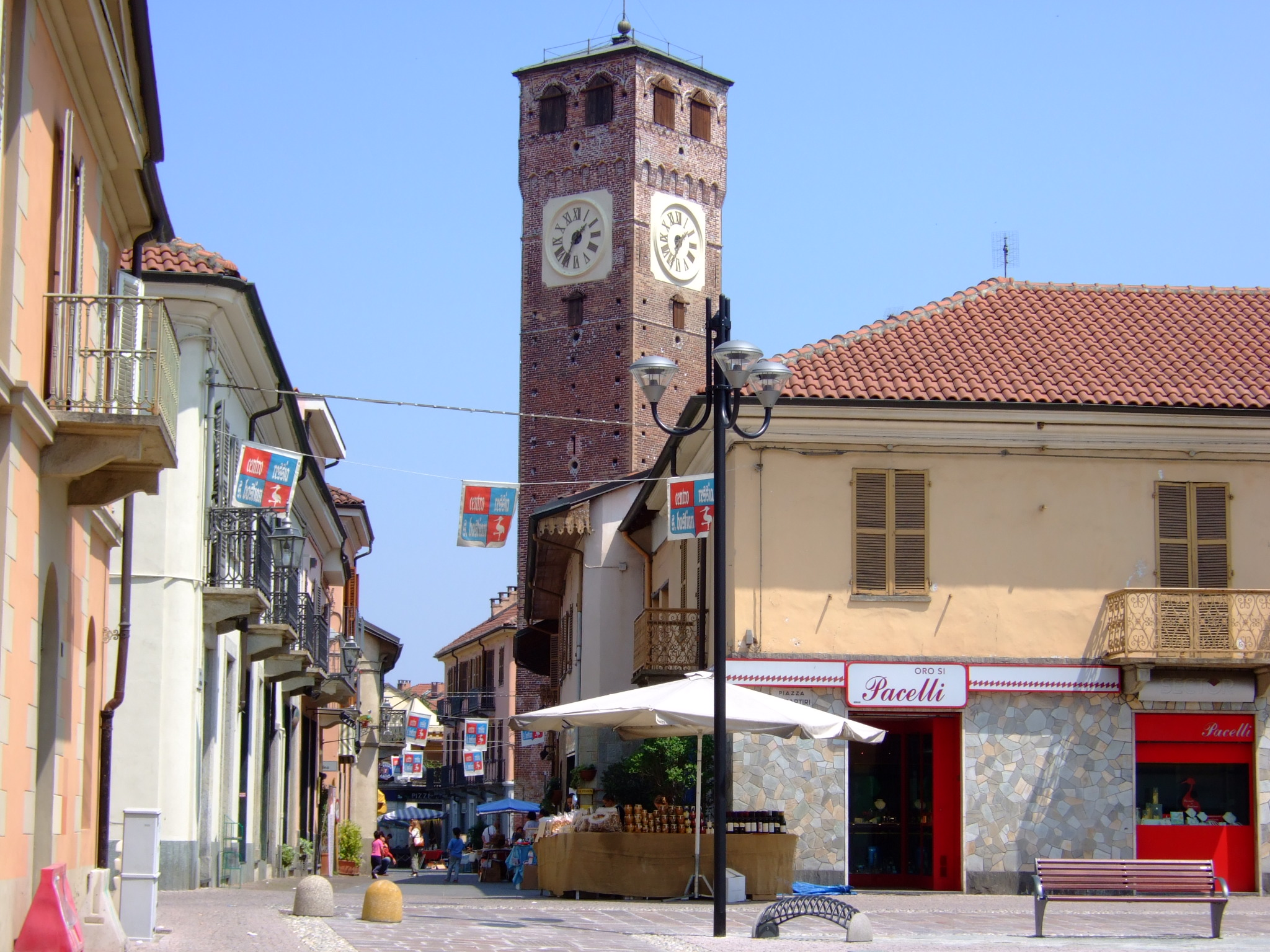
- Downtown Grugliasco

- Coat of arms

- Location within Italy Location within Piedmont
- Coordinates: 45°4′N 7°35′E
- Country: Italy
- Region: Piedmont
- Metropolitan city: Turin
- Frazioni: Certezza, Gerbido, Lesna, Mandina, Mulino, San Vincenzo

Government
  - Mayor: Emanuele Gaito (PD)

Area
  - Total: 13.13 km^{2} (5.07 sq mi)
- Elevation: 293 m (961 ft)

Population (2026)
  - Total: 36,410
  - Density: 2,773/km^{2} (7,182/sq mi)
- Demonym: Grugliaschese(i)
- Time zone: UTC+1 (CET)
  - Summer (DST): UTC+2 (CEST)
- Postal code: 10095
- Dialing code: 011
- Patron saint: St. Roch
- Saint day: 31 January
- Website: Official website

Grugliasco (Italian: [ɡruʎˈʎasko]; Piedmontese: Grujasch [ɡryˈjɑsk]) is a town and comune (municipality) in the Metropolitan City of Turin, in the region of Piedmont, Italy, about 9 kilometres (6 miles) west of Turin. It had a population of 36,410.

Grugliasco shares borders with the municipalities of Turin, Collegno, and Rivoli.

== Etymology ==
The name may be derived from the pre-aural Gruglascum or Curlascum, from Currelio-ascum, the ancient name of a Roman settler who was possibly assigned part of these lands during the Roman centuriation of the western suburbs of Turin.

Other scholars argue that the toponym refers to crane birds, which may have stopped here during seasonal migrations.

The town possibly adopted the crane ("gru") as a heraldic symbol for its coat of arms, first attested in 1613.

== History ==
The first historical documents mentioning the town date back to 1047, when Emperor Henry III the Black cited the canonical Chapter of the Cathedral of San Giovanni di Torino with the rights to the property owned, including the curtis Grugliascum, with the already existing church dedicated to San Cassiano di Imola, and the tenth paid to the Chapter by the inhabitants of the villa. The town developed over time around the nucleus of the Turin canons' property, which corresponds to the current historic centre, adjacent to the ancient church of San Cassiano. Despite the strong devotion that bound them to the ancient chapel, in 1599 the Grugliaschesi placed themselves under the 'protection' of San Rocco against the looming plague: San Rocco thus became the new patron saint of the town, and a church was dedicated to him, from which the township in which it was erected takes its name. The current appearance of the chapel is the result of the renovation carried out between 1826 and 1828 on a project by the architect Ignazio Michela. At the beginning of the thirteenth century, the village called Grugliascum was included in the possessions of the Savoia-Acaia, until 1619, when the Duke of Savoy Carlo Emanuele I erected it as a county, infeudating it to the City of Turin. The Grugliaschese county, therefore, expanded, economically and geographically, throughout the seventeenth century, to the limits of an ancient city's walls (destroyed in 1384 by the Torinesi).

=== The bealera of San Vito ===
However, vestiges of the Late Middle Ages are scarce and limited to the civic tower and a fresco (Madonna col Bambino) on the facade of San Cassiano. In addition, the non-existent irrigation of the territory, devoid of streams or rivers, led to a relatively slow urbanisation. The creation, in the fifteenth century, of a still-existing bealera which is mostly buried but still used for the irrigation of the fields in Strada del Gerbido determined a faster economic development of the village. The canal was derived from the Dora Riparia near Alpignano; after crossing Rivoli and Collegno, it reached as far as Grugliasco, near the ancient Chapel of San Vito (also from about 1450–1490), where it branched into two subchannels, the upper horn (towards the south) and the lower horn (towards the east). Grugliasco was subject to an epidemic of plague in the sixteenth century, and in the eighteenth century gained dignity and territorial independence from Turin. Around the sixteenth century, the water supply led to the birth of a factory near Villa Valperga. Other spinning mills were then built along the upper horn, which took the name of via dei Filatoi. However, in the nineteenth century, the sericulture economy suffered a serious crisis, due to mulberry disease and the predominance assumed by France in this particular textile sector.

=== 20th century ===
Grugliasco underwent urban and industrial growth at the beginning of the twentieth century, spreading northwards primarily due to the Leumann cotton mill in Collegno and the nearby hamlet of Fabbrichetta. The last industrial and urban expansion was due to the proximity to the FIAT Mirafiori factories, which made Grugliasco a major centre of the automotive industry: in fact, the plants of Pininfarina, Bertone, Vignale, Westinghouse, Itca, and Cimat arose. In the 21st century, only a few remain active, while both the freight exchange centre called "SITO Interporto di Torino" and the new Turin fruit and vegetable markets C.A.A.T. have established themselves in the industrial area.

In 1945, members of the retreating German 34th Infantry and 5th Mountain divisions murdered 68 civilians in the town and in Collegno in retaliation for a partisan ambush.

== Demographics ==
Historical population
Year	Pop.	±%
1861	2,531	—
1871	2,651	+4.7%
1881	2,832	+6.8%
1901	3,201	+13.0%
1911	3,399	+6.2%
1921	4,461	+31.2%
1931	5,012	+12.4%
1936	5,583	+11.4%
1951	6,945	+24.4%
1961	13,664	+96.7%
1971	30,688	+124.6%
1981	34,572	+12.7%
1991	41,115	+18.9%
2001	38,725	−5.8%
2011	37,194	−4.0%
2021	37,090	−0.3%
Source: ISTAT

As of 2026, the population is 36,410, of which 48.1% are male, and 51.9% are female. Minors make up 13.3% of the population, and seniors make up 30%.

=== Immigration ===
As of 2025, of the known countries of birth of 36,181 residents, the most numerous are: Italy (33,824 – 93.5%), Romania (617 – 1.7%), Morocco (224 – 0.6%).

== Symbols ==
The coat of arms and banner were granted by decree of the President of the Republic on 3 July 1962. "In red, to the silver crane supported by a mountain of green, holding in the right paw the silver watch. Exterior ornaments from the municipality with the crown topped by another crane from the unfolded flight." The banner is a white drape richly adorned with silver embroidery.

== Sights ==
- Civic tower: located in Piazza S. Cassiano in the city centre, the tower is considered the symbol of Grugliasco. It was erected in the fifteenth century for defensive purposes, transformed into a Chappe telegraph after the passage of Napoleon and subsequently assumed the function of bell tower of the church behind S. Cassiano
- Church of S. Cassiano: millennial building, whose presence has been documented since the ninth century: it is located in the square of the same name and represents the main church of the city. Expanded and restored from the end of the seventeenth century to the end of the eighteenth century, the church received a new facade only in 1881, designed in the classicist style by the engineer Ferrante. On this last occasion, the fresco still visible was found, belonging to a previous attempt to create a facade dating back to the fifteenth century.
- Church of the Holy Spirit (via Moncalieri, 77–79)
- Chapel of San Rocco: an ancient sixteenth-century chapel, located at the beginning of Viale Gramsci, towards Largo Polesine. It was dedicated to St. Rocco after the plague epidemic of 1599, an event that made the saint the patron saint of the city. The current aspect is attributable to nineteenth-century renovations
- Chapel of S. Vito: small chapel dating back to the end of the '400, located in Piazza Don Cocco, not far from S. Cassian. A fifteenth-century fresco representing Christ on the throne was recently discovered on the facade.
- Chapel of the Brotherhood of Santa Croce: placed behind the church of S. Cassiano, in via Giustetti, dates back to the last thirty years of the sixteenth century, but was heavily remodelled in Baroque style between 1767 and 1780.
- Villa Boriglione: can be visited from the entrance of via Lanza, from which its imposing city walls start. The villa, built at the beginning of the eighteenth century, is surrounded by a large park, since 2000 redeveloped into the Le Serre Cultural Park. Here, there are various events, including music, exhibitions, and cultural events in the city. In its basement, you can visit the RiMu (Refuge / Museum) by the Cojtà Gruliascheisa Association.
- Villa Claretta Assandri: located inside a large walled garden, in via La Salle, the villa was built in the second half of the seventeenth century and today houses the Museum of Great Turin and the Granata Legend.
- Villa Gay di Quarti: located in the central via Lupo, at number 87, it is a seventeenth-century villa, formerly part of a vast estate, which included a rustic and a huge park that also served as an orchard and a grove (in addition to housing a pond). The house and the rustics, recently restored to their splendour, are now part of a residential complex, while the green area behind has become the main urban park of Grugliasco (Parco Porporati).
- Villa Il Palazzo: located in the village of Gerbido, precisely in via Moncalieri 6, was built in the middle of the eighteenth century at the behest of Count Carlo di S. Martino, Marquis d'Agliè. Externally, it has a long wall decorated with terracotta vases, inside which there is an entrance garden, a courtyard of honour and a farmhouse, the latter placed behind the villa.
- Villa Il Maggiordomo: also in Borgata Gerbido, ideally accessible from via Bertone, takes its name from the office of butler of Casa Savoia di Valeriano Napione, who had it built between 1675 and 1683. For the strong similarity of the building with Palazzo Carignano in Turin, some scholars attribute the architectural project to the famous Guarino Guarini. The villa is currently in a state of precarious structural preservation, awaiting adequate renovations.
- Villa Audifredi di Mortigliengo: in the "San Marcellino Champagnat" park of via Cotta, there is what was born as a holiday residence in the seventeenth century, and then became, with the count from whom it takes its name and with the banker Giovanni Battista Barbaroux, a nineteenth-century setificio. In 1903, it was purchased and renovated by the Maristi Brothers, who made it a convent, while today it houses a centre for the elderly.
- Villa Sclopis or Il Barocchio: located between Gerbido and Borgata Lesna, in the Barocchio street, it belonged to the Counts Sclopis del Borgo, among whom are remembered the famous painter and engraver Ignazio, the literate Alessandro and the Minister Federigo (the latter is dedicated a street in Turin).
- The historic farmhouses: outside the central nucleus of the city, towards the borders with Turin, there are several farmhouses built between the seventeenth and eighteenth centuries, most still used today for agricultural activities. In Borgata Gerbido, there are the Cascina Villanis (with baroque chapel and manor house called Villa Ceresole), the Cascina Mandina (with elegant baroque chapel outside the walls), the Cascina Duc (hosting the relics of Sant'Antero and today the seat of a farmhouse) and the Cascina Il Trotti (with eighteenth-century chapel). In the Antica si Grugliasco street there are instead the remains of the Cascina Armano (with an imposing villa, in a state of advanced degradation), the Cascina Il Quaglia (located in the homonymous village, which houses a few metres the residential complex, the baroque chapel of the SS. Annunziata and the old street portal of the Pronda) and the Cascina Astrua (with annexed chapel named after the Blessed Virgin Comforter).
- RiMu: underground air-raid shelter of the Second World War, with an original capacity of 75 people, and an annexed Grugliaschesità Museum, in Villa Boriglione, in the Le Serre Cultural Park. The site is managed by the cultural association "Cojtà Gruliascheisa", known as the creator of the Palio della Gru since 1984.

Interprovincial Institute for Mental Infirms "Vittorio Emanuele III" (former psychiatric hospital).

=== Museums ===
In Grugliasco, there are:

- The Gianduja Museum.
- The Museum of the Great Turin and the Granata Legend, in Villa Claretta-Assandri.
- The Museum of Agriculture of Piedmont.
- The RiMu (Anti-Aircraft Refuge and Grugliaschesità Museum) at the Cultural Park "Le Serre".

=== Library ===
The "Pablo Neruda" library in Grugliasco was founded on 2 January 1970, in a building originally belonging to the Maristi Brothers, a religious congregation. Starting from a single room, the library received three extensions, the last of which was in 2002. Its catalogue has been computerised since 1998, and it has entered the SBAM[14] since 2009.

== Culture ==
Starting in 2001, Grugliasco began to establish itself as one of the main training centres of the Contemporary Circus nationwide. The Le Serre park hosts a contemporary circus school throughout the year and in summer the international contemporary circus exhibition "Sul Filo del Circo/Au Fil du Cirque", which has now become the largest Italian event completely dedicated to the contemporary circus.

=== Traditions and folklore ===
Although St. Rocco is celebrated on 16 August, since 2000 the ecclesiastical authority has allowed the Grugliaschesi to move the patronal feast to 31 January, in memory of the first procession made to implore, through the intercession of the saint, the end of the pestilence. However, the main church is not named after St. Roch, but St. Cassianus. However, in memory of the end of the plague, every first Sunday of June, since 1984, the well-known Palio della Gru has been celebrated, organised by the Cojtà Gruliascheisa Association, which sees seven villages in the city compete, in a re-enactment of the monks who towed the carts of the plague patients of 1599. The racing carts support a crane (symbol of the city), and travel a track in the historic centre; the Palio ends at a collective fair on the weekend. The event is included in the "Travel in Time" circuit of the province of Turin as a historical re-enactment.

=== Honours ===
- Silver Medal of Civil Merit

"Small rural municipality of about eight thousand inhabitants, generously engaged in the partisan struggle, suffered a heinous massacre by Nazi troops who brutally slaughtered twenty heroic citizens, including young people not yet in their twenties. A bright example of a spirit of sacrifice and a deep faith in a free and democratic Italy".

=== Urbanism ===
- The west gate of Turin

After World War II, eastern Grugliasco, bordering the municipality of Turin, was involved with the adjacent municipality of Collegno to the north, by the project of Corso Marche, a new boulevard that was to cross the suburbs of the city of Turin. Subsequently, Grugliasco was affected by the expansion of the southeast area, called Certezza zone (Corso Allamano/Strada antica di Grugliasco/Piccolo Hotel), and by the redevelopment of the nearby hamlet Gerbido, on the border with the Centro Europa area of the Mirafiori Nord district of Turin. The plan provided for the road connection of the current motorway ring road west of Turin, with the exits/entrances of Rivoli, the railway station of Interporto "Sito", and Corso Allamano. In 2007, according to the intervention plan "Corso Marche" by the architects Augusto Cagnardi and Vittorio Gregotti[16], the northern area of Grugliasco becomes a surface-level part of a series of multi-level tunnels: on the second basement level, the trains of the planned goods eaves of the high-speed railway (TAV) will pass, while on the surface course, roofed by these two tunnels, will be remodelled with standards common to the rest of the future course. In the municipality of Grugliasco, the project will have slightly different characteristics than most of the intervention plan:

- The high-speed railway, in fact, from the border with the municipality of Turin will continue along the Torino-Modane - Interporto di Orbassano railway junction.
- Boulevard and underground highway, on the other hand, will continue their course along the area affected by via Crea up to the border with the municipality of Turin.
- The project was rethought and greatly reduced by the municipalities concerned in 2018 and at the end of 2021 no specific construction site has yet started.

== Twin towns and sister cities ==
Grugliasco is twinned with:

- Roman, Romania
- Barberà del Vallès, Spain
- Échirolles, France
- Gourcy, Burkina Faso
- San Gregorio Magno, Italy
