= Léba (department) =

- Department
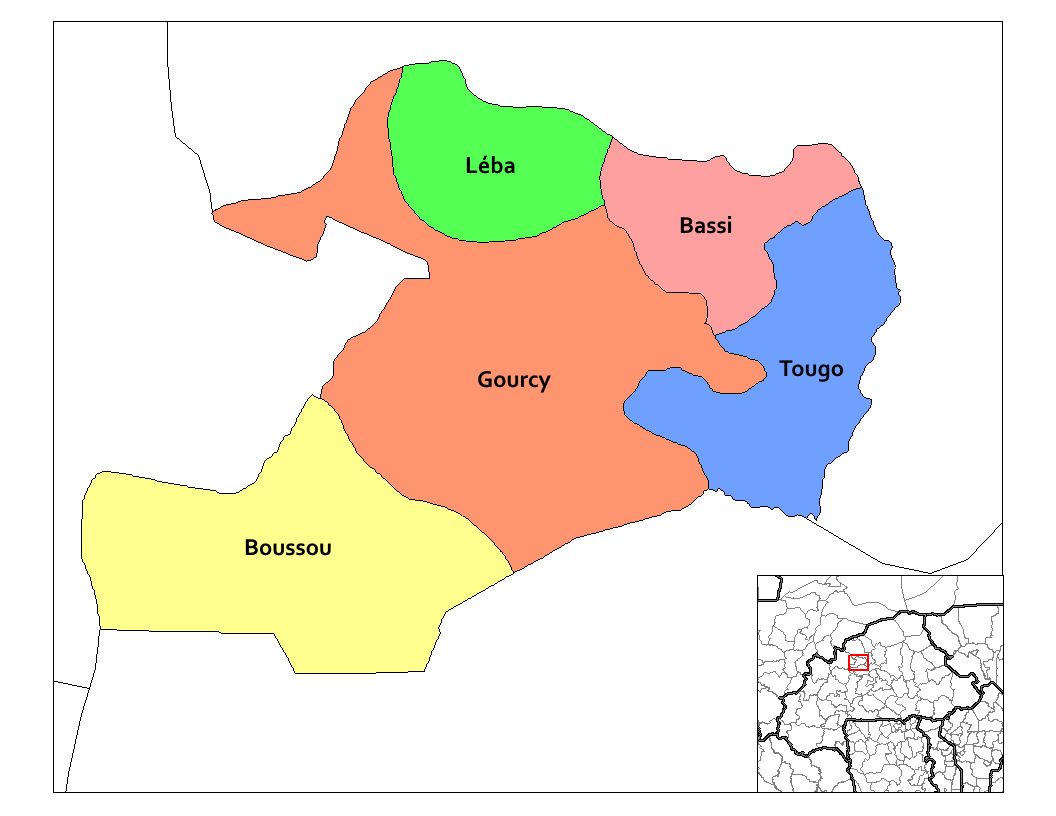
- Léba Department location in the province
- Country: Burkina Faso
- Region: Hauts-Bassins Region
- Province: Zondoma Province

Area
  - Total: 78.9 sq mi (204.3 km^{2})

Population (2019 census)
  - Total: 13,562
  - Density: 171.9/sq mi (66.38/km^{2})
- Time zone: UTC+0 (GMT 0)

Léba is a department or commune of Zondoma Province in Burkina Faso.
