= Boussou Department =

Coordinates: 13.0195°N 2.5630°W

Boussou
- Department
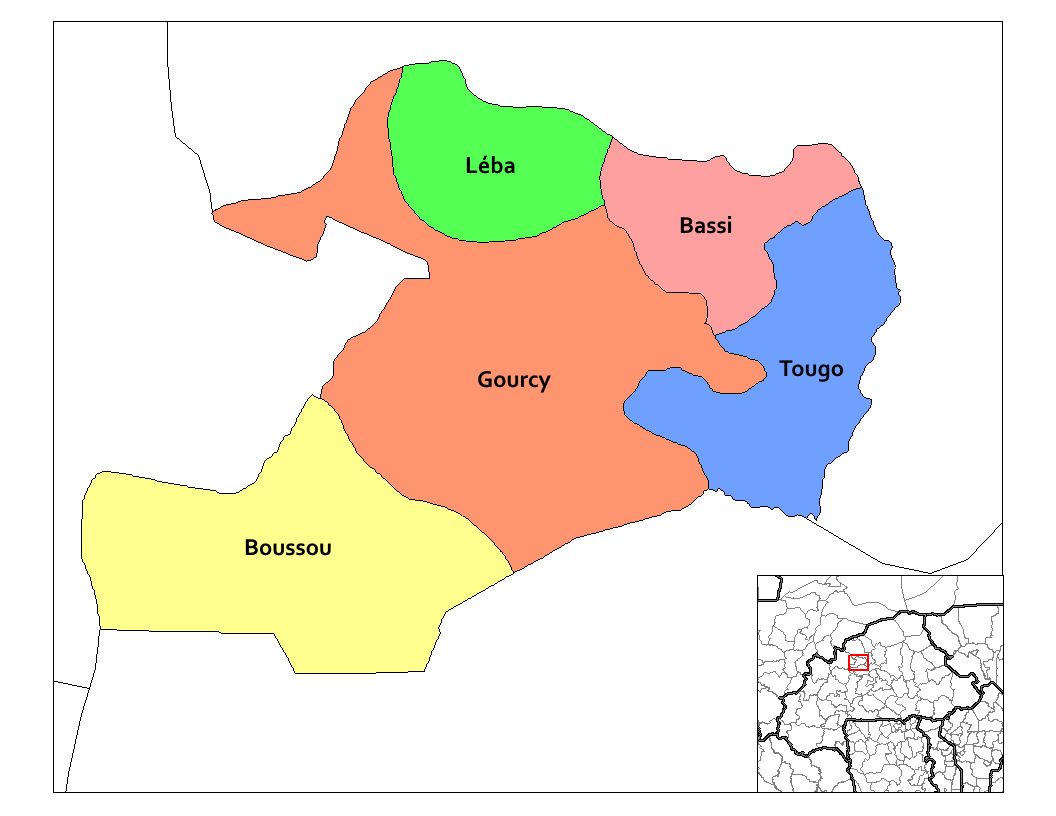
- Boussou Department location in the province
- Country: Burkina Faso
- Province: Zondoma Province

Area
  - Total: 192.6 sq mi (498.9 km^{2})

Population (2019 census)
  - Total: 32,993
  - Density: 171.3/sq mi (66.13/km^{2})
- Time zone: UTC+0 (GMT 0)

Boussou is a department or commune of Zondoma Province in western Burkina Faso. Its capital lies at the town of Boussou.

== Towns and villages ==
- Bangassé (population 2,402)
- Baoudoumboin (population 675)
- Darba (Burkina Faso) (population 558)
- Garou (population 627)
- Kirikodogo (population 1,585)
- Kiripalogo (population 1,144)
- Kolkom (population 816)
- Kourbo (population 2,496)
- Nogolado (population 300)
- Ouembaïri (population 1,094)
- Pallé (population 1,602)
- Posso (population 2,109)
- Tamounouma (population 2,603)
- Tangaye (population 285)
- Toubyengo (population 2,223)
