= Gourcy Department =

Coordinates: 13.2000°N 2.3500°W

Gourcy
- Department
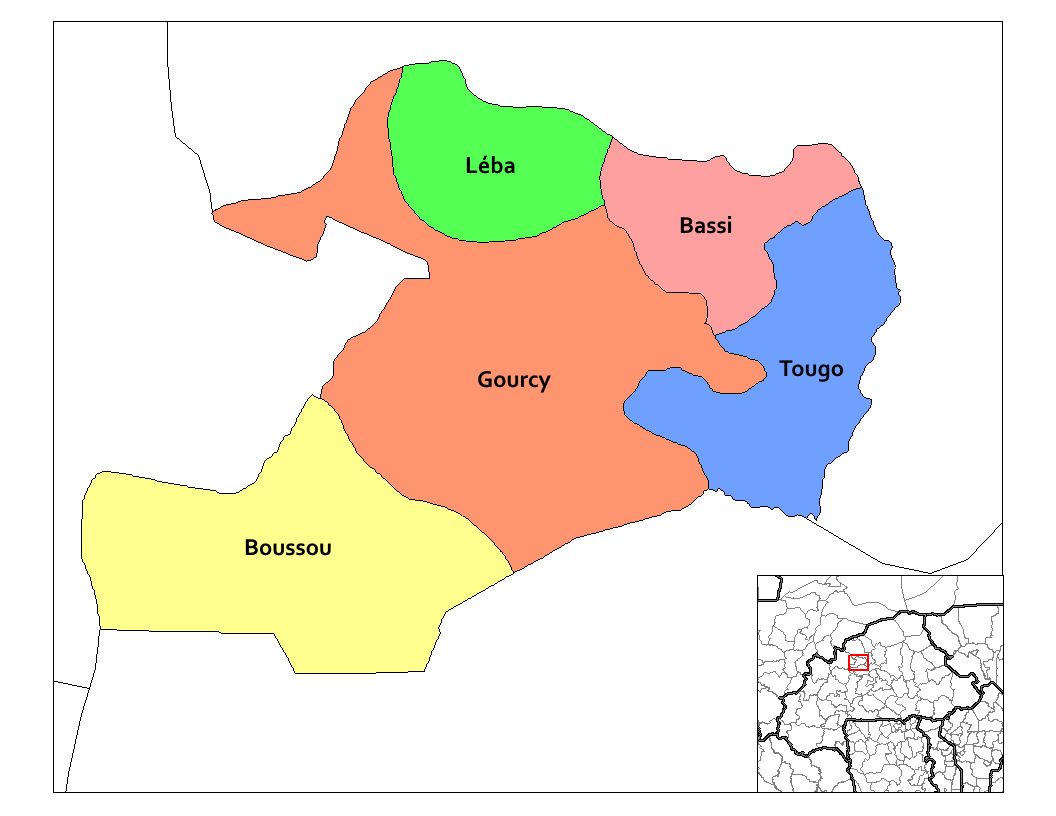
- Gourcy Department location in the province
- Country: Burkina Faso
- Province: Zondoma Province

Area
  - Department: 298 sq mi (773 km^{2})

Population (2019 census)
  - Department: 117,740
  - Density: 394/sq mi (152/km^{2})
  - Urban: 40,141
- Time zone: UTC+0 (GMT 0)

Gourcy is a department or commune of Zondoma Province in western Burkina Faso. Its capital is the town of Gourcy.
