= Tougo Department =

Coordinates: 13°12′N 2°07′W

Tougo
- Department
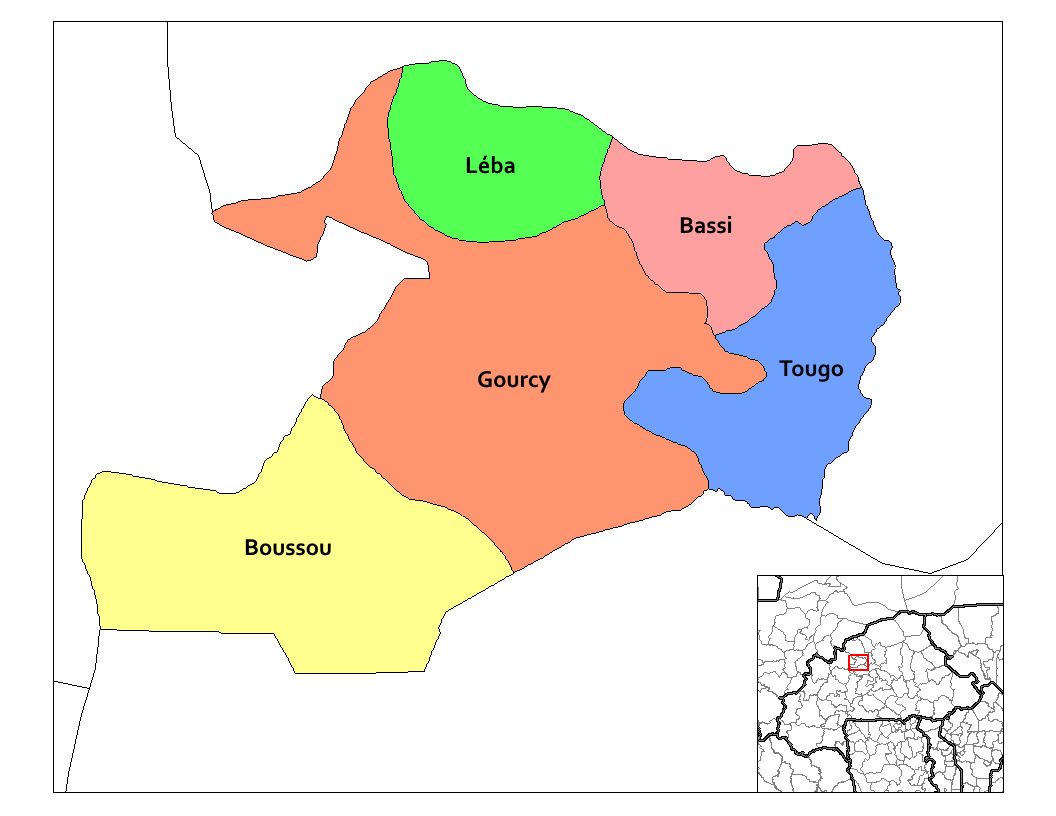
- Tougo Department location in the province
- Country: Burkina Faso
- Province: Zondoma Province

Area
  - Total: 119.6 sq mi (309.8 km^{2})

Population (2019 census)
  - Total: 41,278
  - Density: 345.1/sq mi (133.2/km^{2})
- Time zone: UTC+0 (GMT 0)

Tougo is a department or commune of Zondoma Province in western Burkina Faso. Its capital lies at the town of Tougo.
