= Track gauge in Italy =

Historically, Italy had two unusual dominant track gauges which were legally defined depending on the terrain encountered. The gauge of 1,445 mm (4 ft 8 7/8 in) was used for the national Italian rail network and was very similar to the 1,435 mm (4 ft 8 1/2 in) standard gauge commonly used elsewhere in the world.

Since the 1930s, the 1,435 mm gauge has been adopted as the standard and gradually replaced the 1,445 mm track gauge. Thus, in Italy, only a few older tram systems, such as the Milanese tramway network, remain equipped with 1,445 mm.

The other popular gauge, a narrow gauge, was defined at 950 mm (3 ft 1 3/8 in) and is very similar to the metre gauge – 1,000 mm (3 ft 3 3/8 in) – commonly used in many other parts of Europe and thus came to be known as "the Italian metre gauge".

== Historical legal definitions of 1879 ==
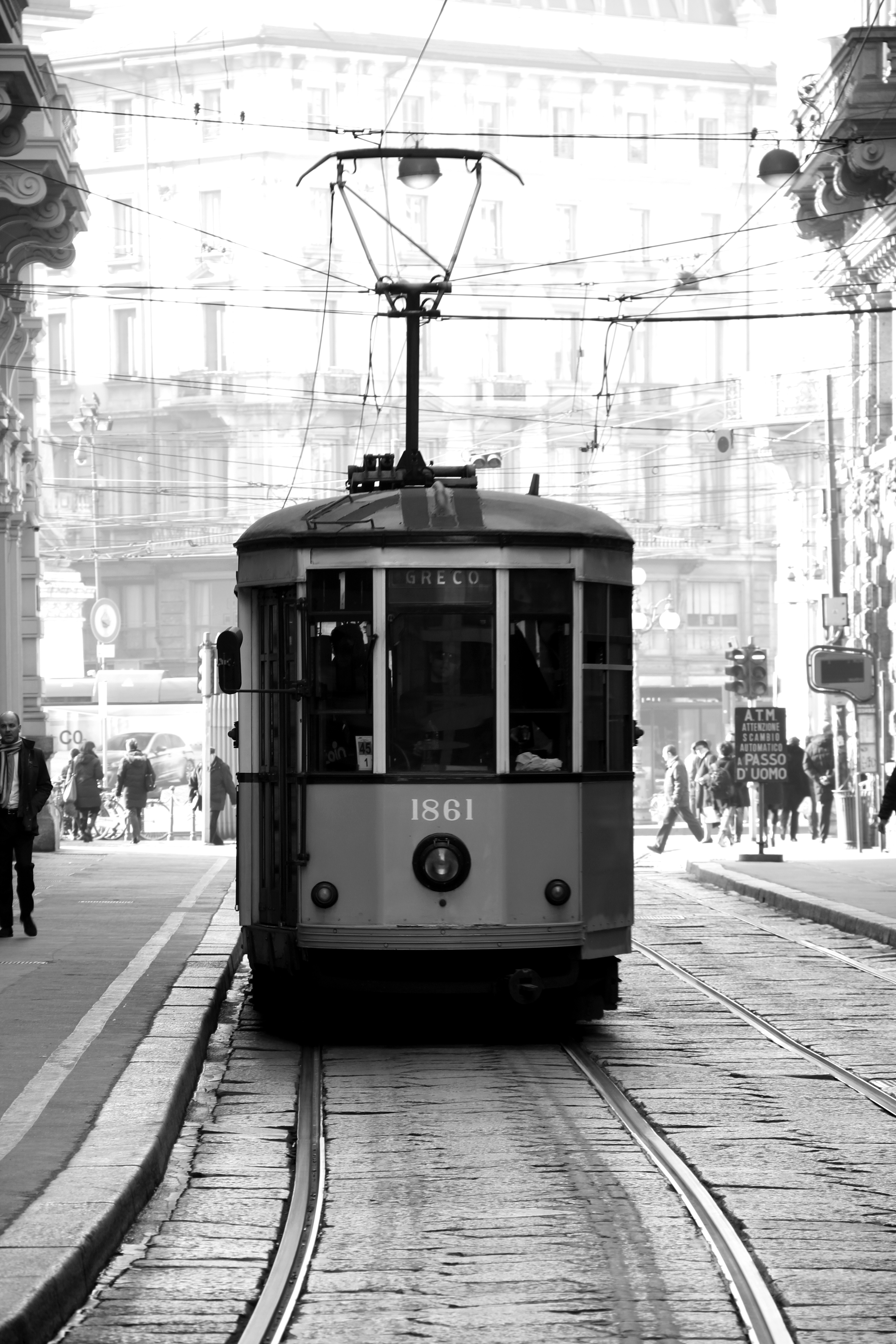
The Milan tramway network, the largest in Italy, runs on Italian broad gauge.

Italian law has defined its track gauges in terms of the distance between the centres of each rail, rather than the inside edges of the rails, giving some unusual measurements. According to the law of 28 July 1879, the only legal gauges in Italy were 1,500 mm (4 ft 11 1/16 in), 1,000 mm (3 ft 3 3/8 in), measured between the rail centres, which correspond to 1,445 mm (4 ft 8 7/8 in) and 950 mm (3 ft 1 3/8 in) between the rail inside edges.

The narrower gauge has 1,000 mm between the centres of the rails, which explains the name Italian metre gauge, but it is 950 mm in gauge when measured from the inside of the rails, as gauges are normally measured in other countries.

A disadvantage of measuring from the centre of the rail is that the width of the rail varies and affects the gauge. It is easier and more reliable to measure from the inner edges of the rails.

== 1,445 mm (4 ft 8 7/8 in) gauge railways ==
The following 1,445 mm (4 ft 8 7/8 in) systems survive today:

- Orvieto Funicular
- Milan tram network
- Turin tram network
- Rome tram network
- Naples tram network

Outside Italy, the Madrid Metro also uses this gauge.

== 1,435 mm (4 ft 8 1/2 in) or standard gauge railways ==
The Italian standard gauge railway system has a total length of 24,227 km (15,054 mi) of which active lines are 16,723 km (10,391 mi). The network is recently growing with the construction of the new high-speed rail network.

== Italian narrow gauge railways ==
In Italy, track gauges of 1,100 mm (3 ft 7 5/16 in), 1,000 mm (3 ft 3 3/8 in), 950 mm (3 ft 1 3/8 in), 850 mm (2 ft 9 15/32 in), 760 mm (2 ft 5 15/16 in) and 600 mm (1 ft 11 5/8 in) are or were present.

The aforementioned 950 mm "Italian metre gauge" was also used in the former Italian colonies of Eritrea (Eritrean Railway), Libya (Italian Libya Railways), and Somalia (Mogadishu-Villabruzzi Railway).

== See also ==
- Narrow gauge railways in Italy
- List of track gauges
