= Zondoma Province =

Coordinates: 13°10′N 2°10′W

Zondoma
- Province
- Location in Burkina Faso

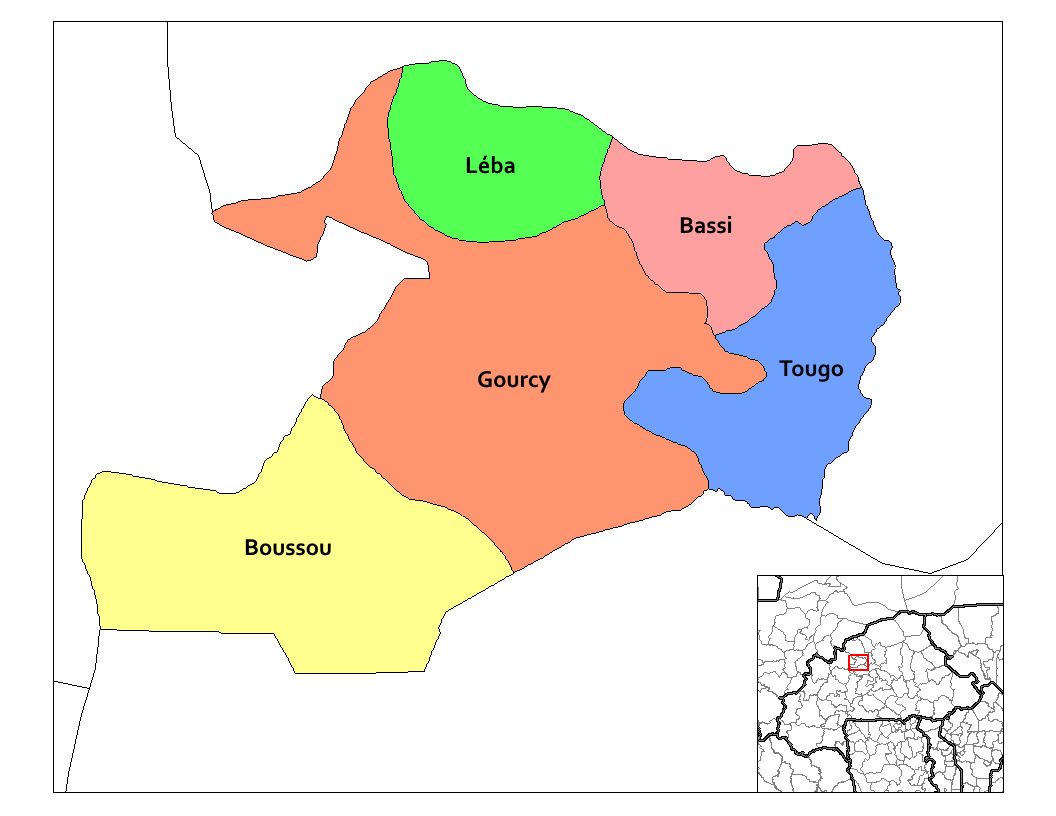
- Provincial map of its departments
- Country: Burkina Faso
- Region: Nord Region
- Capital: Gourcy

Area
  - Province: 1,759 km^{2} (679 sq mi)

Population (2019 census)
  - Province: 239,955
  - Density: 136.4/km^{2} (353.3/sq mi)
  - Urban: 40,141
- Time zone: UTC+0 (GMT 0)

Zondoma is one of the 45 provinces of Burkina Faso, located in its Nord Region. In 2019 the population was 239,955. Its capital is Gourcy.

== Education ==
In 2011 the province had 191 primary schools and 16 secondary schools.

== Healthcare ==
In 2011 the province had 25 health and social promotion centers (Centres de santé et de promotion sociale), 3 doctors and 57 nurses.

== Departments ==
Zondoma is divided into 5 departments:

The Departments of Zondoma
Commune	Capital	Population (Census 2006)
Bassi Department	Bassi	23,234
Boussou Department	Boussou	23,551
Gourcy Department	Gourcy	80,689
Léba Department	Leba	10,511
Tougo Department	Tougo	30,970

== See also ==
- Regions of Burkina Faso
- Provinces of Burkina Faso
- Departments of Burkina Faso
