= Gourcy =

- Location within Burkina Faso, West Africa
- Coordinates: 13°13′N 2°21′W
- Country: Burkina Faso
- Province: Zondoma
- Department: Gourcy Department
- Elevation: 325 m (1,066 ft)

Population (2019 census)
  - Total: 40,141
- Time zone: UTC+0 (GMT)

Gourcy is a town in the Gourcy Department in the province of Zondoma in Burkina Faso. It is the capital of Zondoma Province.
