= Villa Ravera =

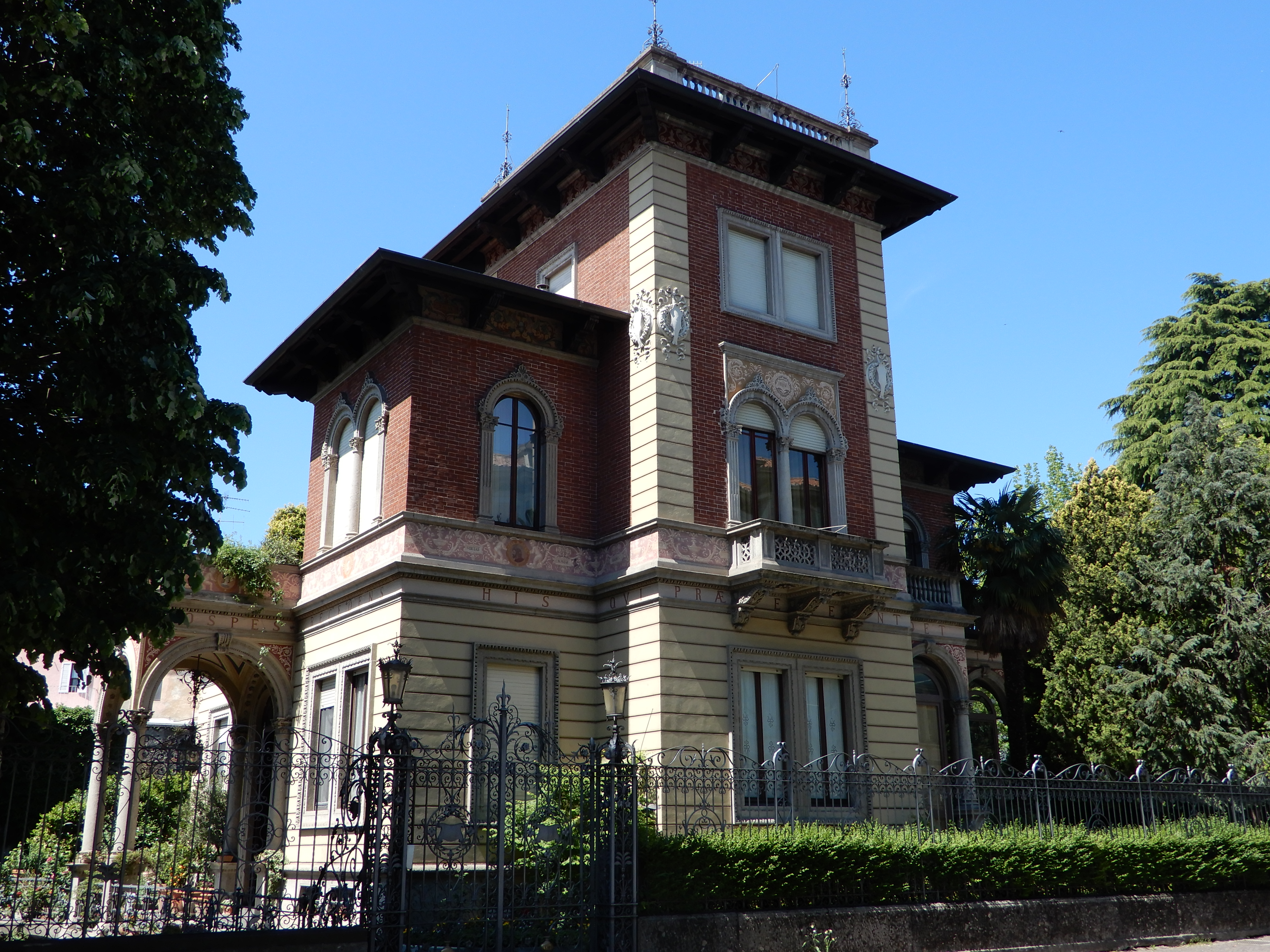
- Villa Ravera in Ivrea
- Click on the map for a fullscreen view

General information
- Location: Ivrea, Italy
- Coordinates: 45°27′51.1″N 7°52′20.8″E

Villa Ravera (formerly known as Villa Demaria) is a historic Renaissance Revival villa located in Ivrea, Italy.

== History ==
The villa, designed by engineer Baraggioli, was commissioned by Dr. Federico Demaria, head physician of the Ivrea hospital and built in 1897. Demaria was married to Angela Baratti, who belonged to a well-known family of confectioners. Construction works were carried out by the Pilatone company. Corso Costantino Nigra, along which the villa is located, was at that time one of areas concentrating the most development in town, as it was the artery that connected the historic city center to the Ivrea railway station via the Ponte Nuovo.

During the Italian Civil War the villa served as the headquarters of the German forces stationed in Ivrea; however, the proximity of the residence to the railway bridge did not prevent the partisans from successfully sabotaging the bridge by blowing it up, thus interrupting the Chivasso–Ivrea–Aosta railway and saving the town from an almost certain Allied bombardment.

In 1946, the Demaria family sold the property to Filippo Bertoletti, who owned an umbrella factory in Ivrea. Unable to fulfill certain commitments, he had in turn to relinquish the property, which was then purchased by the Oderio family for their daughter Olga. She later married the Ivrea cardiologist Mario Ravera, whence the current name of the villa. Their children still reside there today.

== Description ==
The villa is located on Corso Costantino Nigra, opposite Palazzo Ravera. The property borders to the north the garden of Villa Luisa.

The villa features a Renaissance Revival style.

== Gallery ==
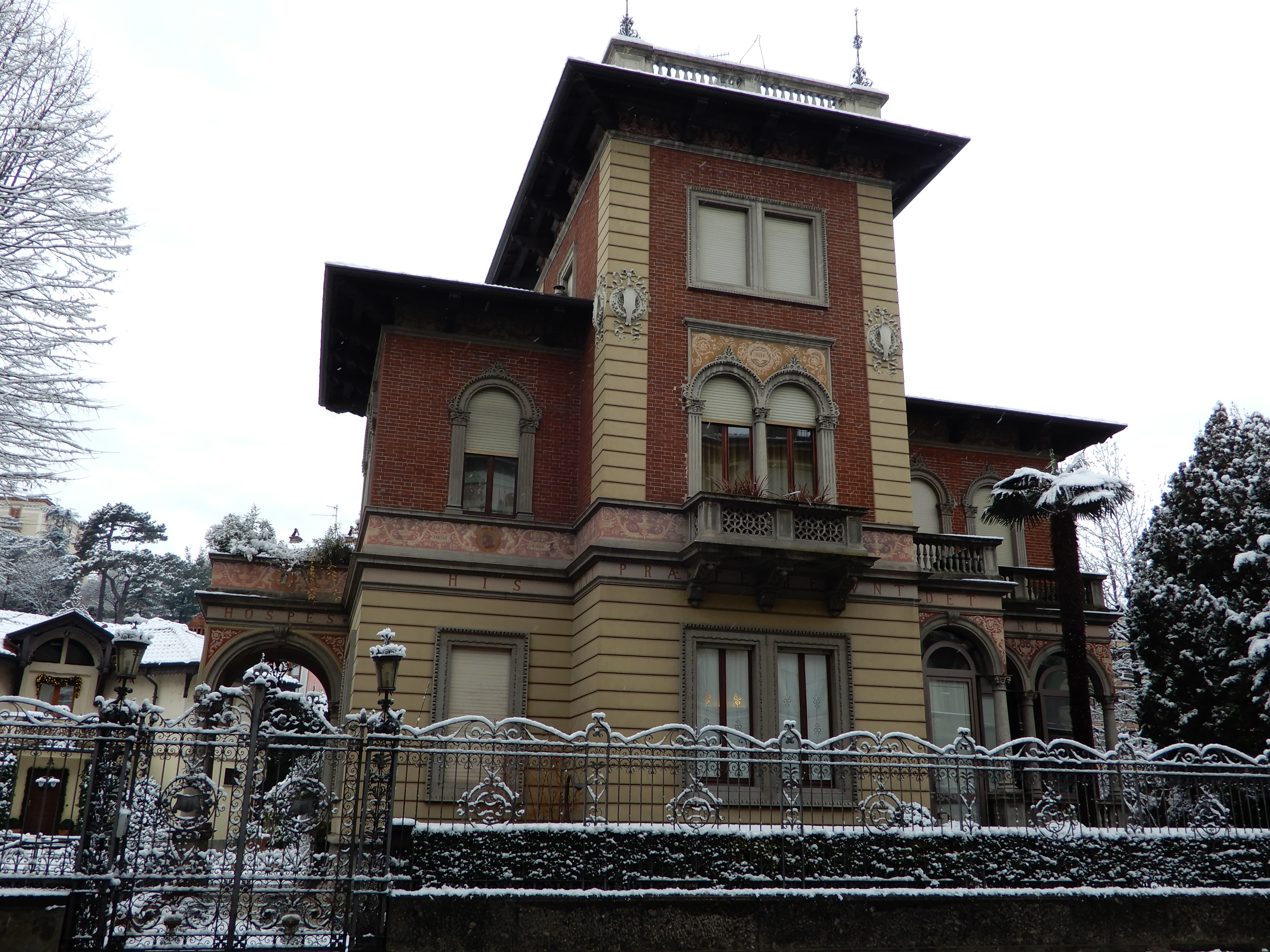

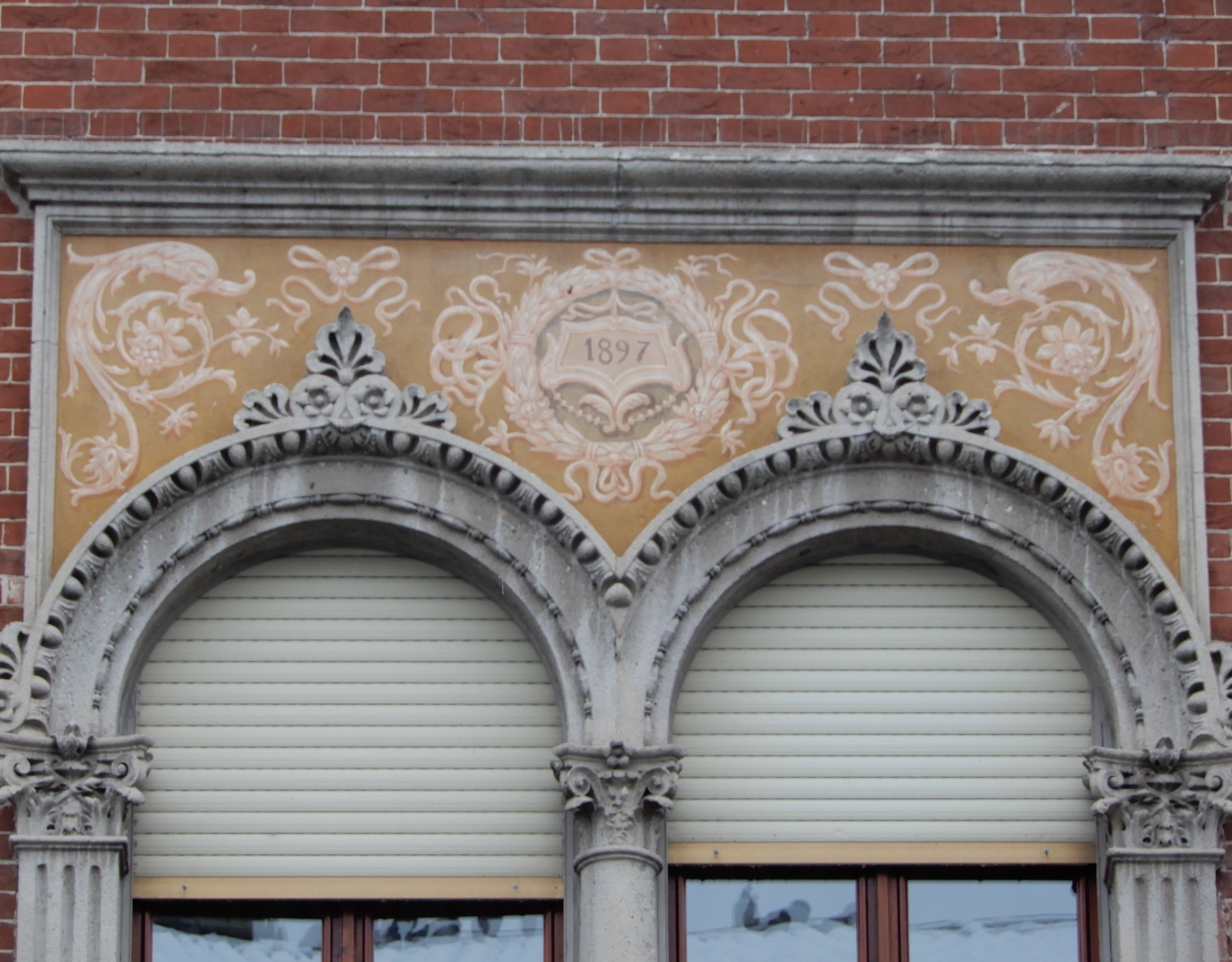

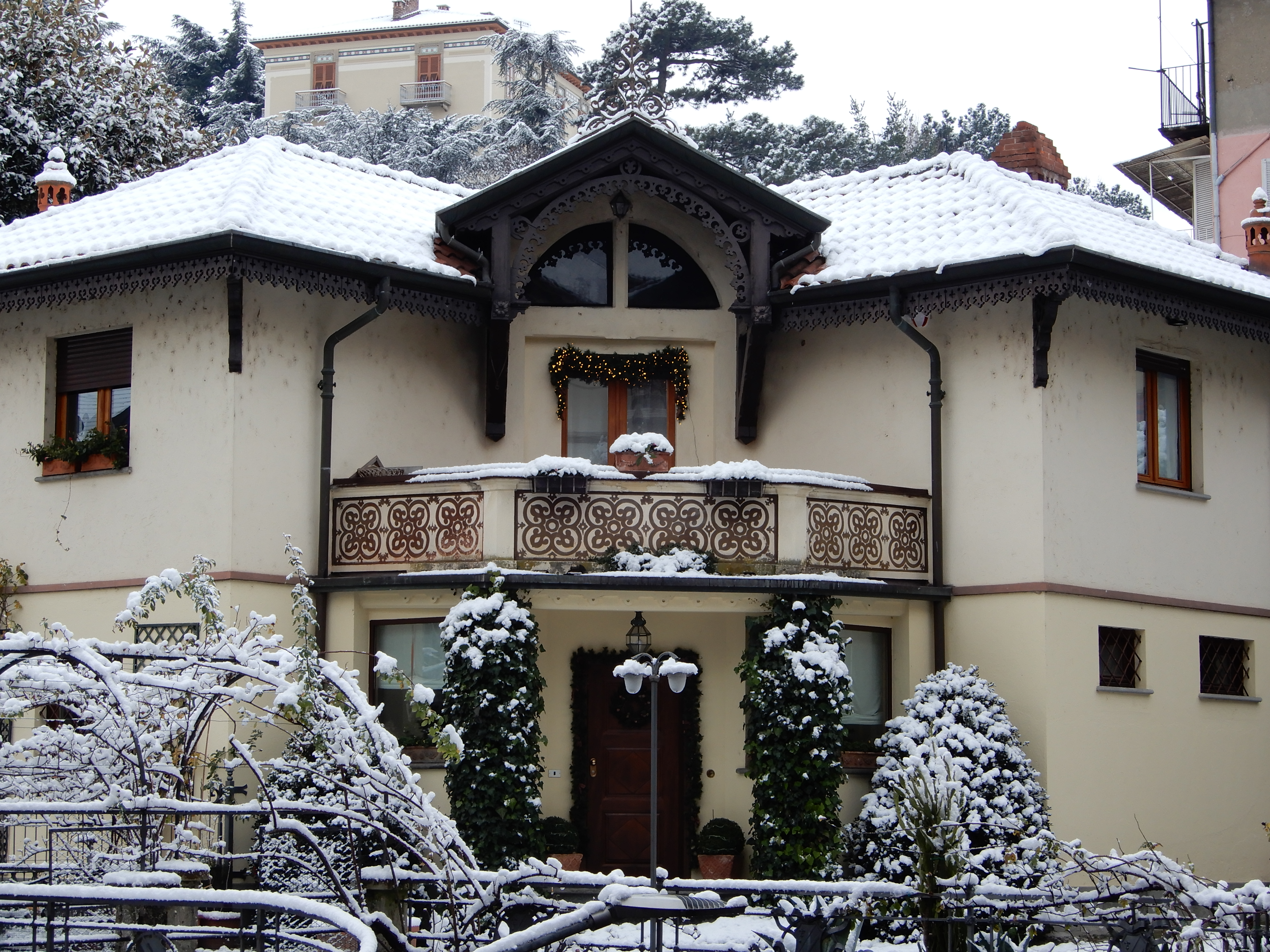
