= Villa Luisa =

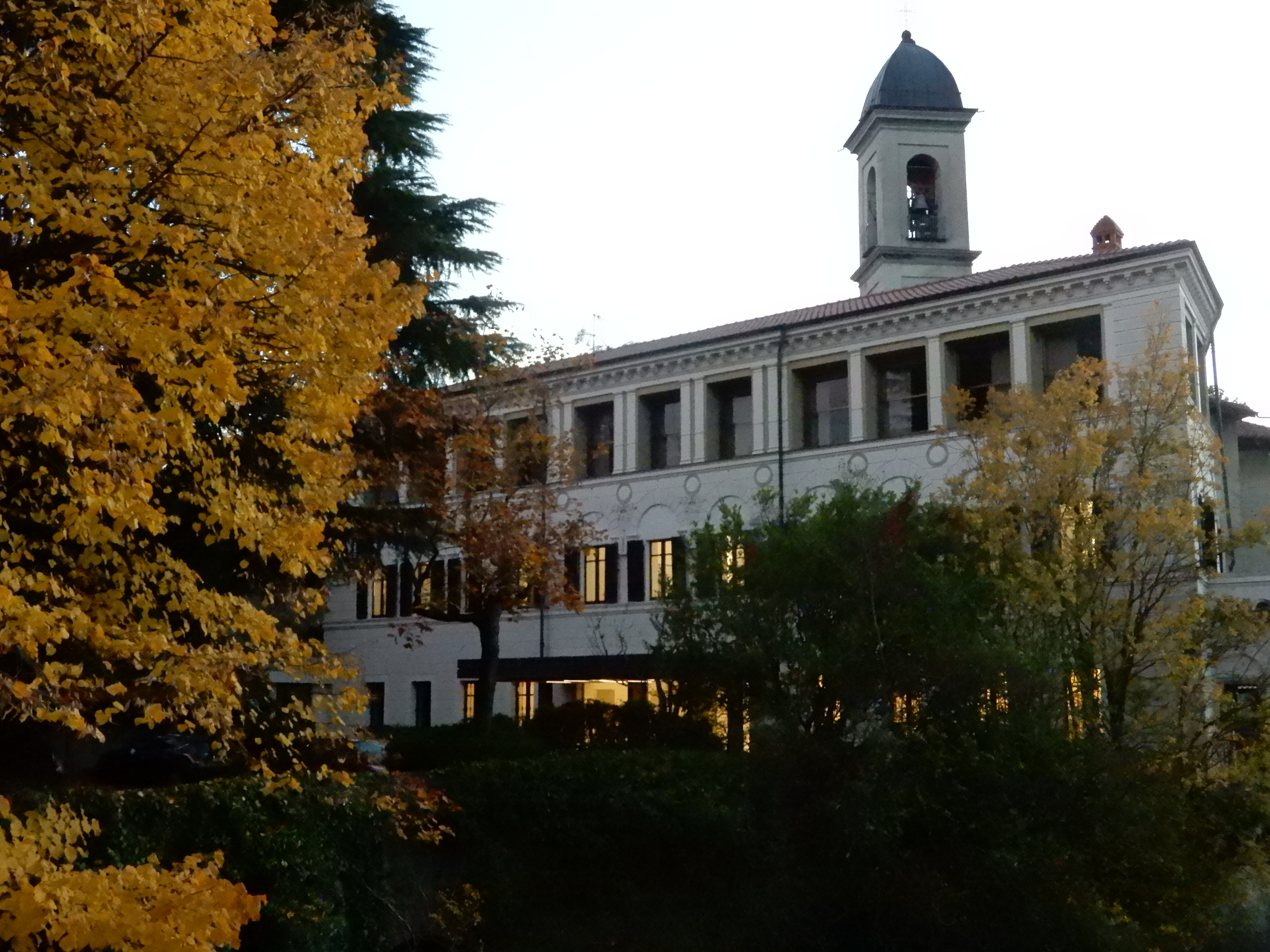
- Villa Luisa in 2020
- Click on the map for a fullscreen view

General information
- Location: Ivrea, Italy
- Coordinates: 45°27′51.52″N 7°52′19.03″E

Villa Luisa is a historic villa located in Ivrea, Italy.

== History ==
Construction works for the villa were commissioned by Gaspare Borgetti, a well-known and esteemed doctor and were completed between 1864 and 1866 after beginning in the early 1860s. Upon the death of Gaspare Borgetti, the property was inherited by his son Giuseppe, who pursued a military career and became Major General in 1893. It is highly likely that the villa was named after his wife, Luisa Cotta Ramusino. Later on, the property was purchased in 1974 by the Industrial Association of Canavese, and after the completion of some renovation works, it became its headquarters in 1977.

In 2020, renovation works were carried out on the façades of the building.

== Description ==
The villa is located on Corso Costantino Nigra, opposite Palazzo Ravera, with its northern side rising on a cliff above the Dora Baltea, between the Ponte Vecchio and the Ponte Nuovo. The property borders to the south the garden of Villa Ravera and to the west the church of San Grato Vescovo. The villa has two entrances: a main one on Corso Costantino Nigra, preceded by a tree-lined garden, and a secondary one on Vicolo Giordano, accessible from the nearby Borghetto.

== Gallery ==
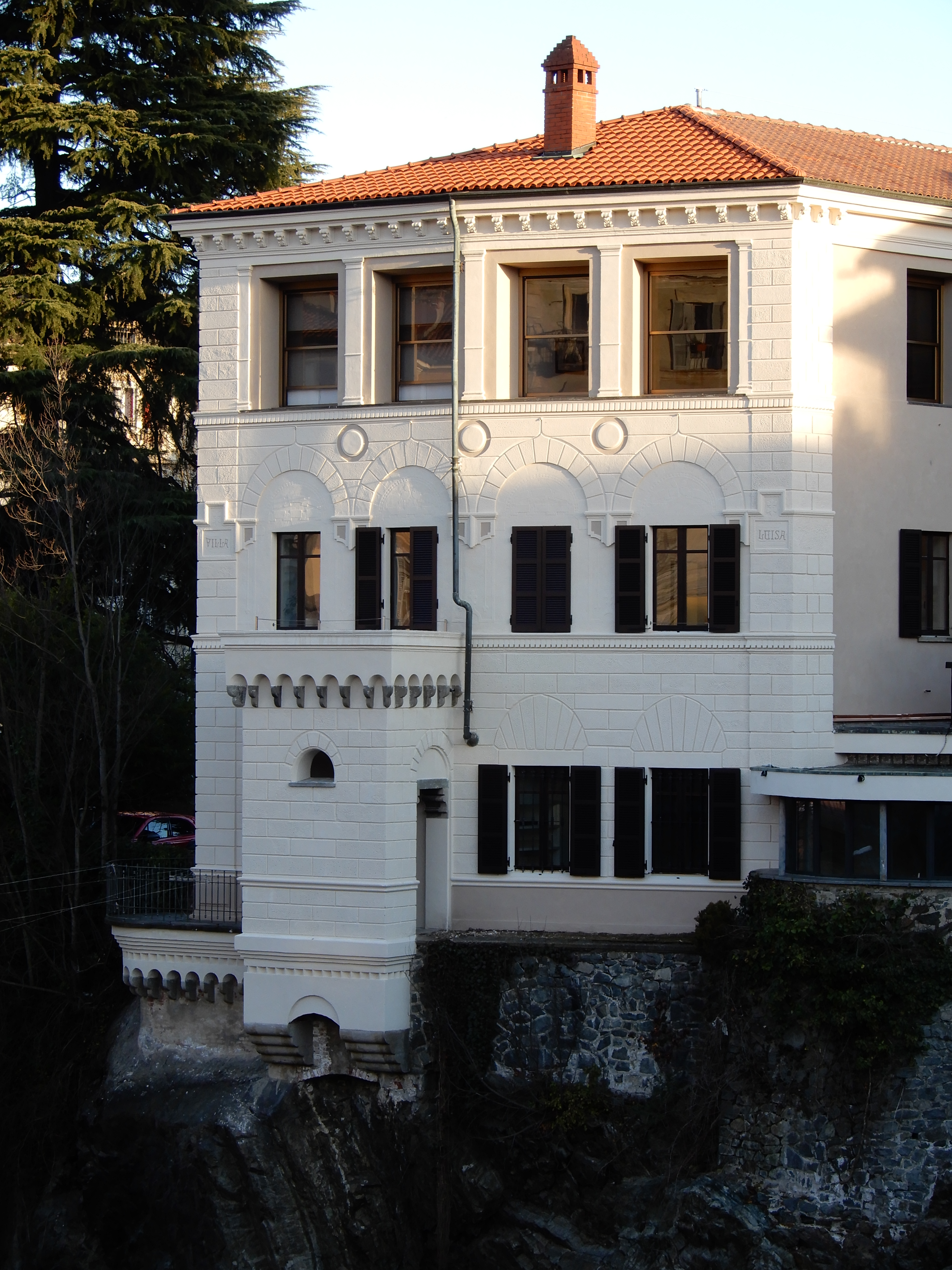

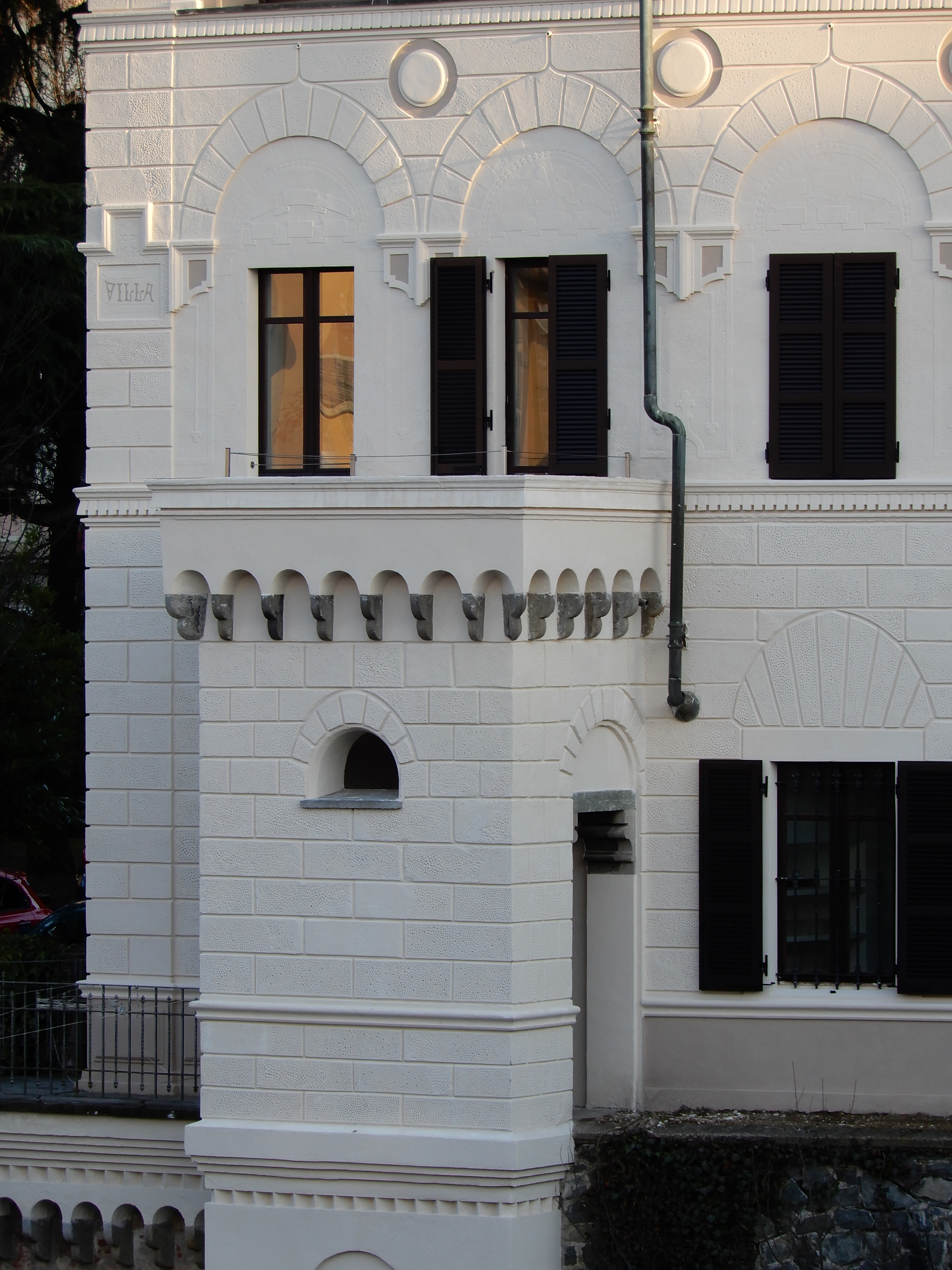

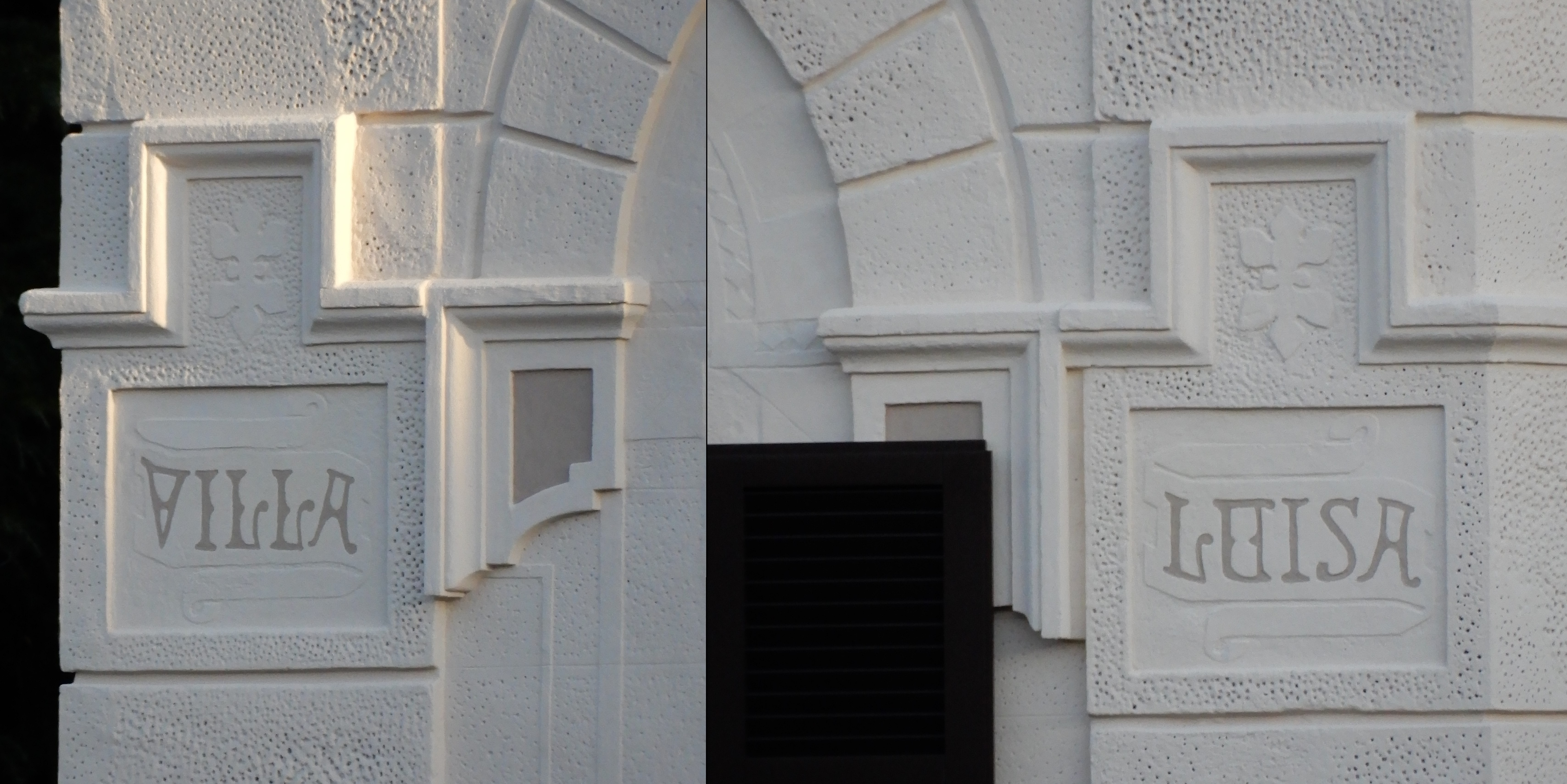
