= Corso Costantino Nigra =

Street in Ivrea, Italy

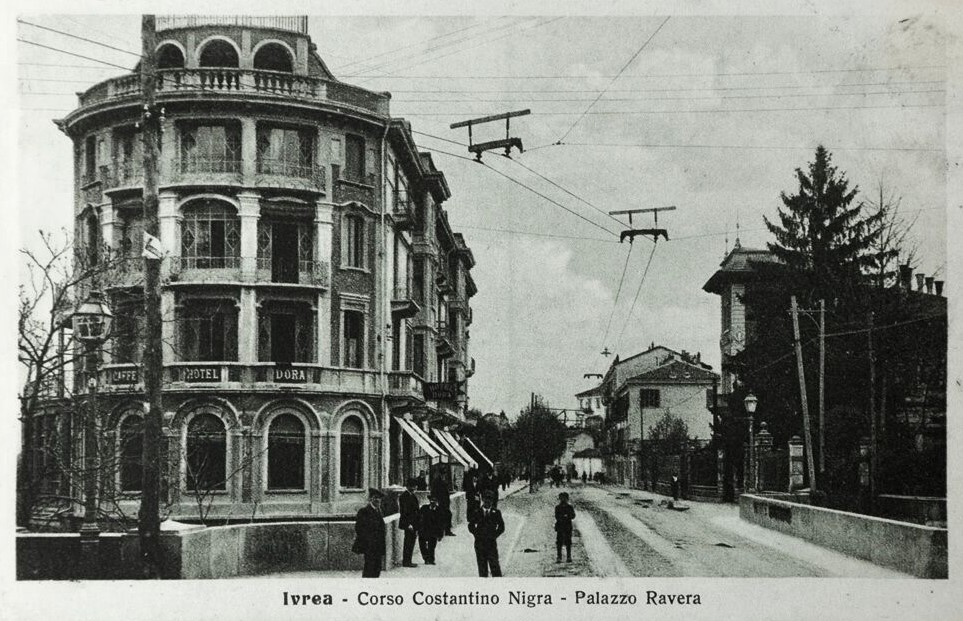
- Interactive map of Corso Costantino Nigra
- Former name: Corso dello Scalo
- Namesake: Costantino Nigra
- Type: Public
- Location: Ivrea, Italy
- Postal code: 10015
- Coordinates: 45°27′46.17″N 7°52′26.15″E

Corso Costantino Nigra is a street in the town of Ivrea, Italy.

== History ==
The road was built by the construction company that also constructed the Ponte Nuovo. It was designed as a new thoroughfare starting from the ancient Porta Dazis to facilitate the transport of materials for the bridge’s construction. Once the bridge was inaugurated in 1860, the road also provided easier access to it. Both the road and the bridge were built to improve and speed up the connection between the town center and the new Ivrea railway station, which opened in 1858.

The construction required significant work since an embankment had to be created between two stone retaining walls, several meters higher than the surrounding land, which was then cultivated with vineyards. This was necessary to bring the road to the same level as the bridge and Corso Cavour on the other side of the river. The project also included the construction of an underpass through the embankment to prevent the houses along the riverbank from being isolated.

The avenue was originally named Corso dello Scalo but was dedicated to Costantino Nigra, taking its current name, in 1900. That same year, the section of the avenue closest to the railway station was enhanced with new public gardens, designed by surveyor Caviglia on behalf of the Municipality.

Shortly after its construction, the avenue became the most popular route to enter Ivrea, replacing the road that passes through the Borghetto quarter and reaches the city via the old Ponte Vecchio. At the same time, the cultivated lands on either side of the new road, enhanced by the construction, the traffic around the railway station, and the panoramic position overlooking the river and the city center, were developed with new and elegant villas. Among the first were Villa Luisa, built by the Borgetti family in the 1860s, and Villa Demaria in 1897. The appearance of this section of the avenue changed drastically between 1906 and 1909 when Palazzo Ravera was built on the steep terrain overlooking the river to the east of the road.

== Description ==
The avenue consists of two sections: one that runs from Ivrea railway station to the Porta Torino intersection, and a second one that extends from this intersection to the Camillo Olivetti Fountain on the opposite bank of the Dora Baltea river via the Ponte Nuovo.

== Gallery ==
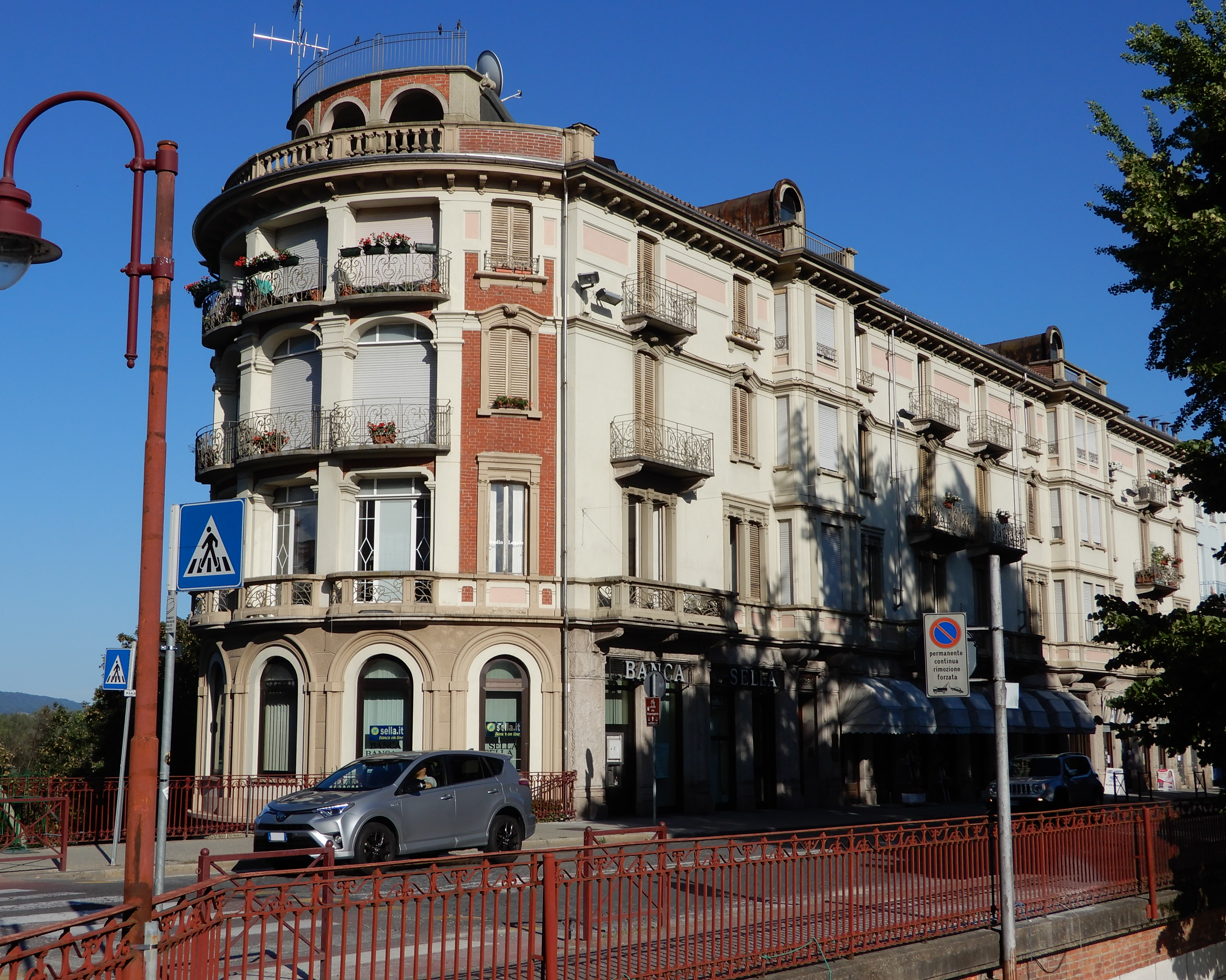

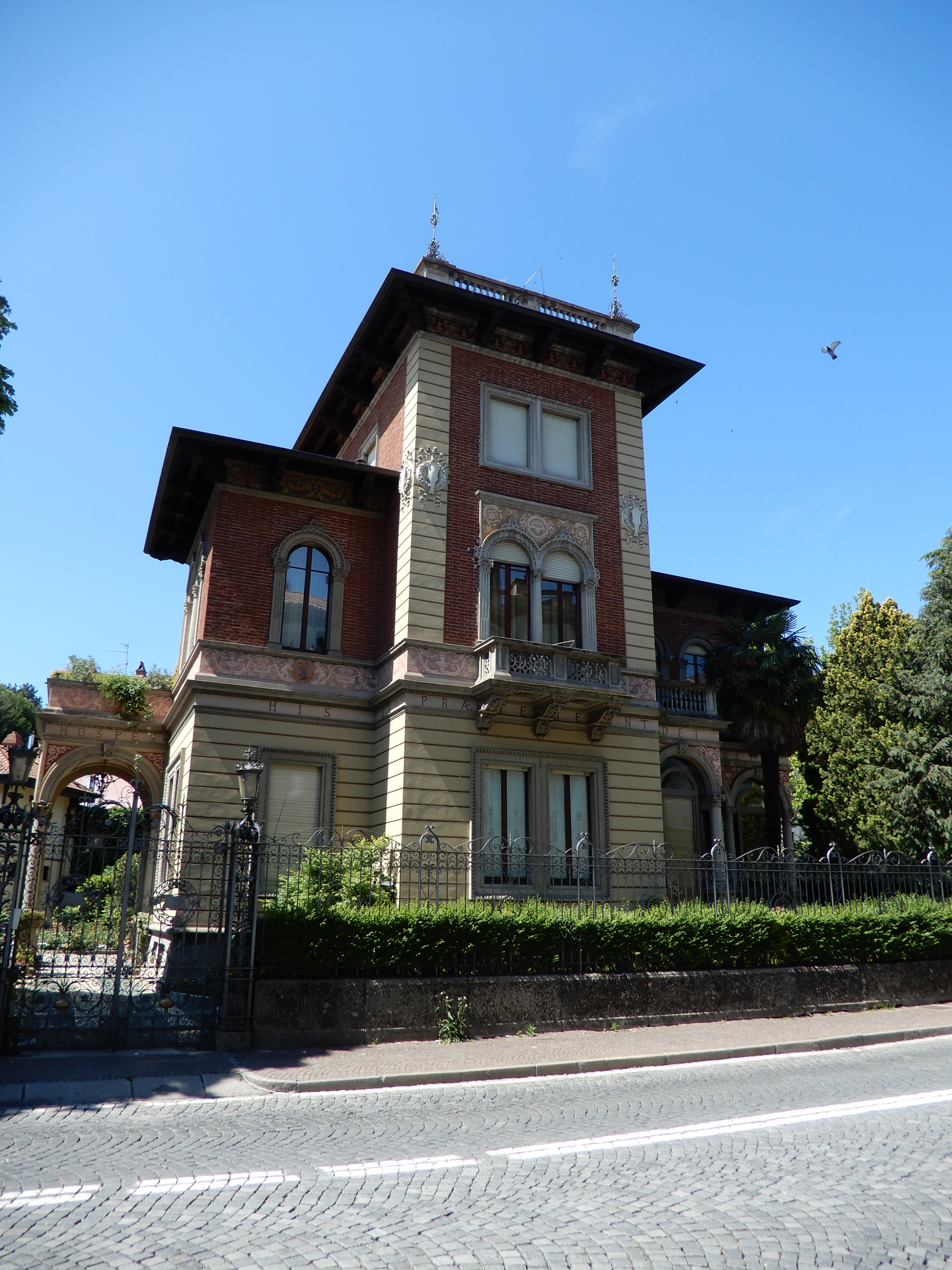

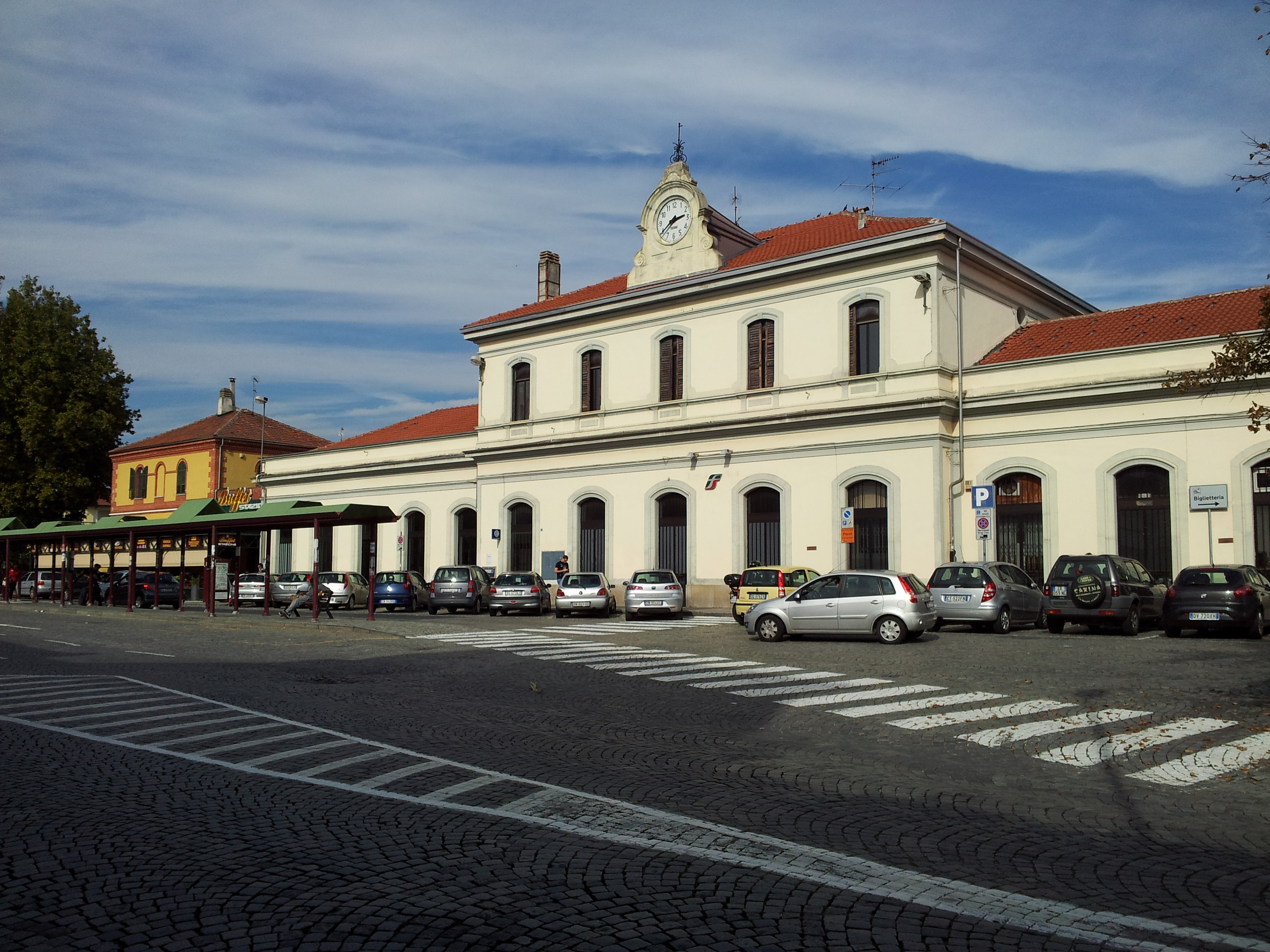
