= Camillo Olivetti Fountain =

Fountain in Ivrea, Italy

- Fontana Camillo Olivetti (Italian)
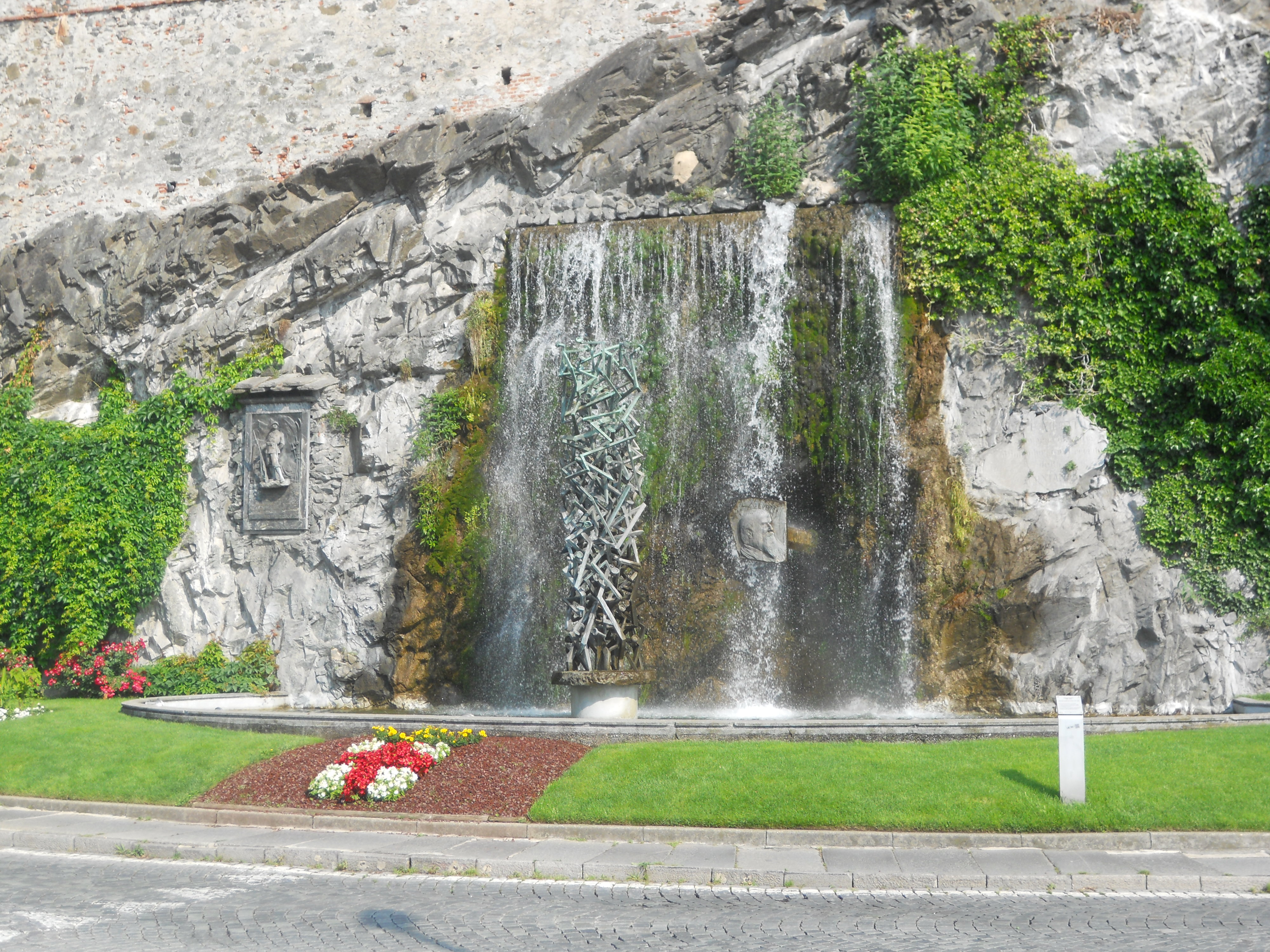
- Artist: Emilio Greco
- Year: 1957
- Location: Ivrea; 45.465°N 7.8722°E

The Camillo Olivetti Fountain (Italian: Fontana Camillo Olivetti) is a memorial fountain located in Ivrea, Italy.

== History ==
The fountain was created by the Italian sculptor Emilio Greco in 1957 and dedicated to Camillo Olivetti, the founder of the Olivetti typewriter company. The fountain's inauguration took place on September 29, 1957, in the presence of the mayor and the bishop of Ivrea.

== Description ==
The fountain is located at the foot of a rock wall cut between 1826 and 1830 near the Dora Baltea. It is the focal point of the elegant Corso Costantino Nigra, which connects the fountain to the Ivrea railway station through the Ponte Nuovo. The fountain features a cascading jet and is decorated with an effigy of Camillo Olivetti and a sculpture intended to recall the mechanisms of typewriters.
