= Villa Chiampo =

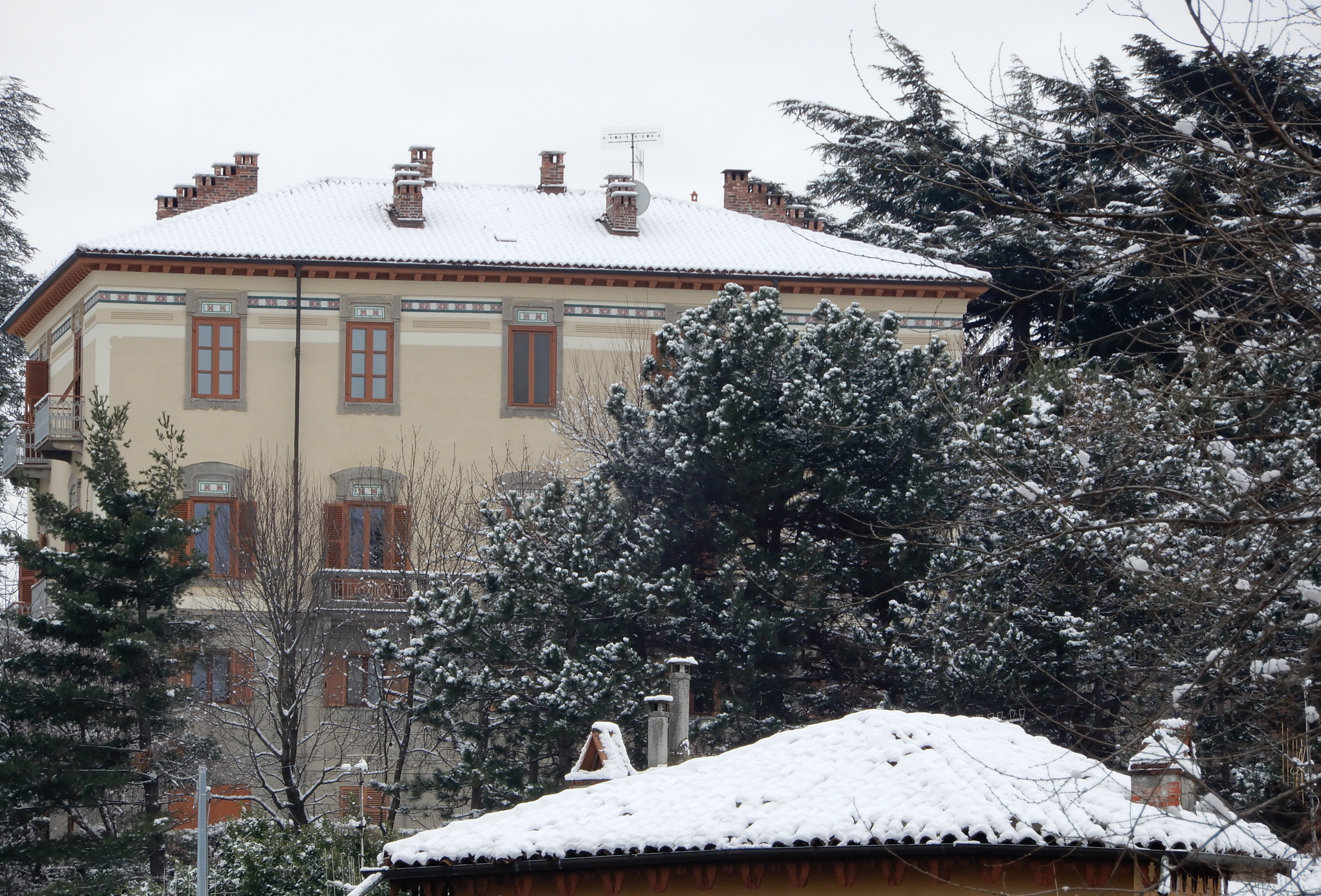
- Villa Chiampo in Ivrea
- Click on the map for a fullscreen view

General information
- Location: Ivrea, Italy
- Coordinates: 45°27′47.42″N 7°52′15.63″E

Villa Chiampo is a historic villa located in Ivrea, Italy.

== History ==
The site where the villa stands was previously occupied by a fortress, known as the Cittadella, that defended the town of Ivrea and which was completely destroyed in 1704.

The exact construction date of the villa is uncertain, but given its presence in an 1883 watercolour by British geographer and naturalist Henry Haversham Godwin-Austen, titled Panoramic View from the hill La Nuova Castiglia, it is reasonable to place its construction around the mid-19th century.

The villa, initially owned by the Borgetti family, as evidenced by the fact that the alley leading from the Borghetto to the villa bears the name of this family from Ivrea, was sold in 1893 to engineer Giacomo Chiampo, who was the mayor of Ivrea from 1888 to 1895. The Borgetti family then moved to another residence they had built in the town in the 1860s, Villa Luisa. In the following years, Villa Chiampo was frequented by the high society of Ivrea and by illustrious guests such as Giuseppe Giacosa, Giovanni Verga, Gabriele D'Annunzio, and Guido Gozzano.

== Description ==
The villa stands atop Mount Ferroglietto in a commanding position over the historic Borghetto neighbourhood, on the right bank of the Dora Baltea.

It is a three-storey building with a rectangular plan. A large terrace with a fountain offers views of the river, the town, and the mountains.

== Gallery ==
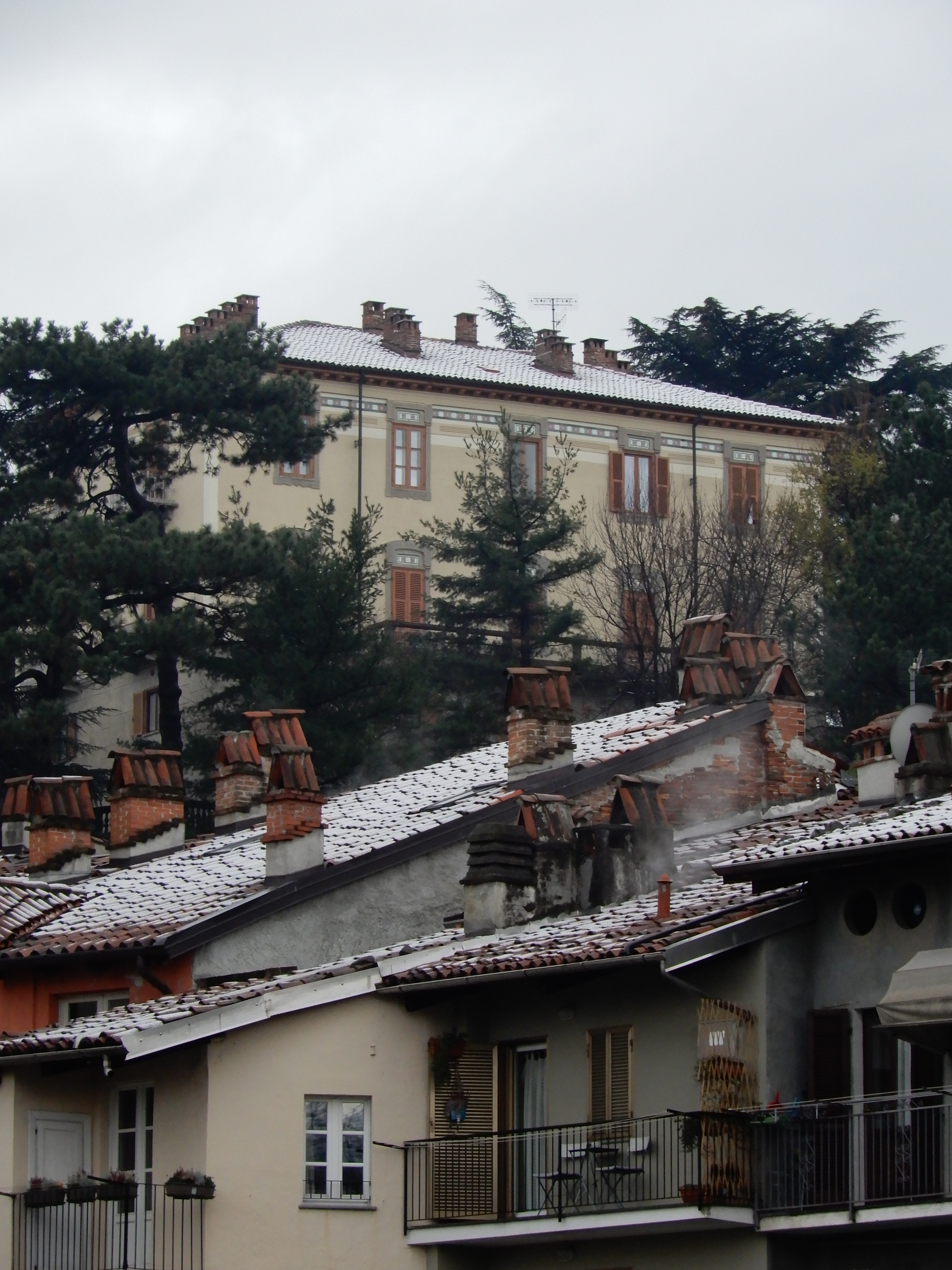

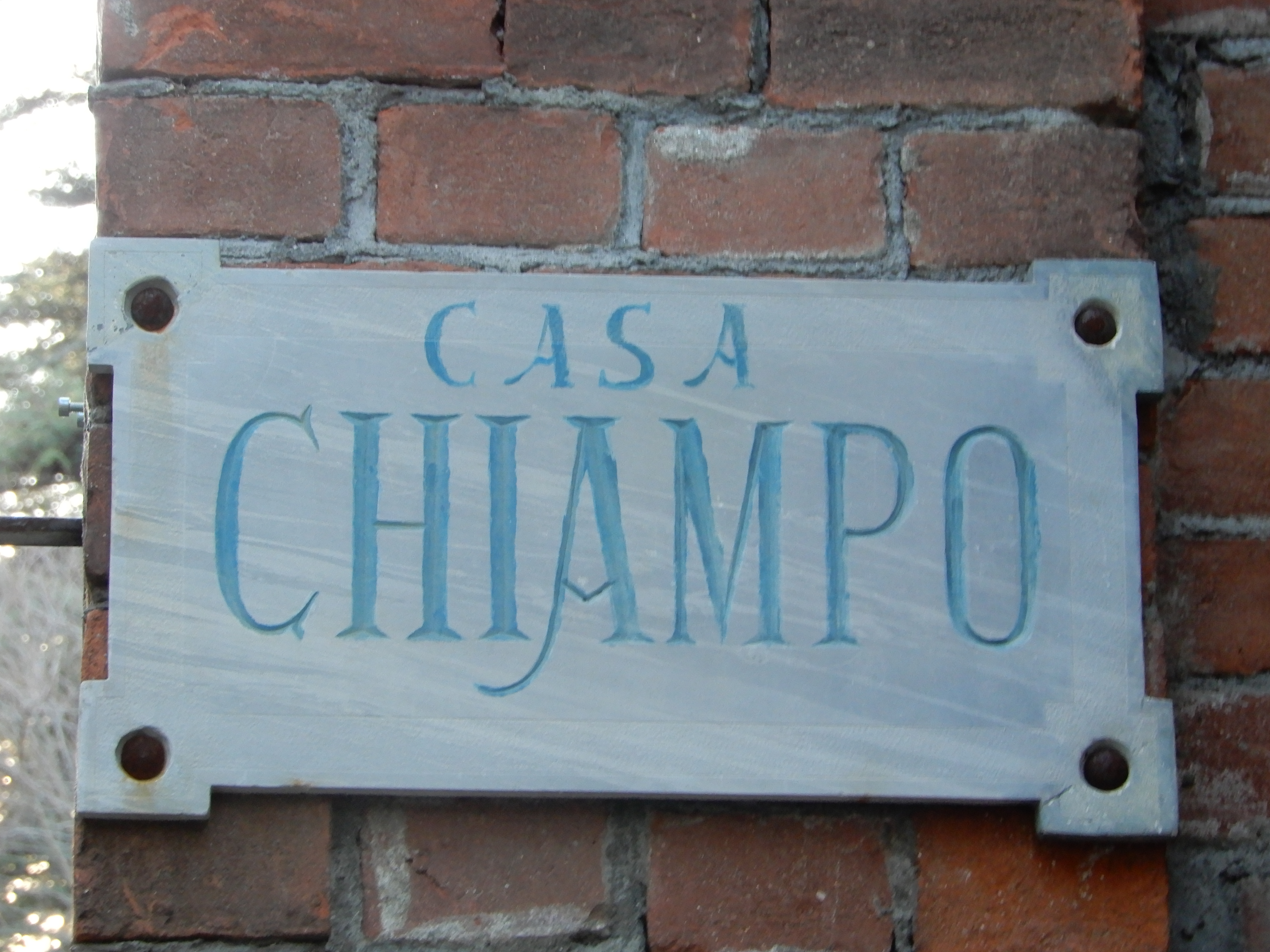

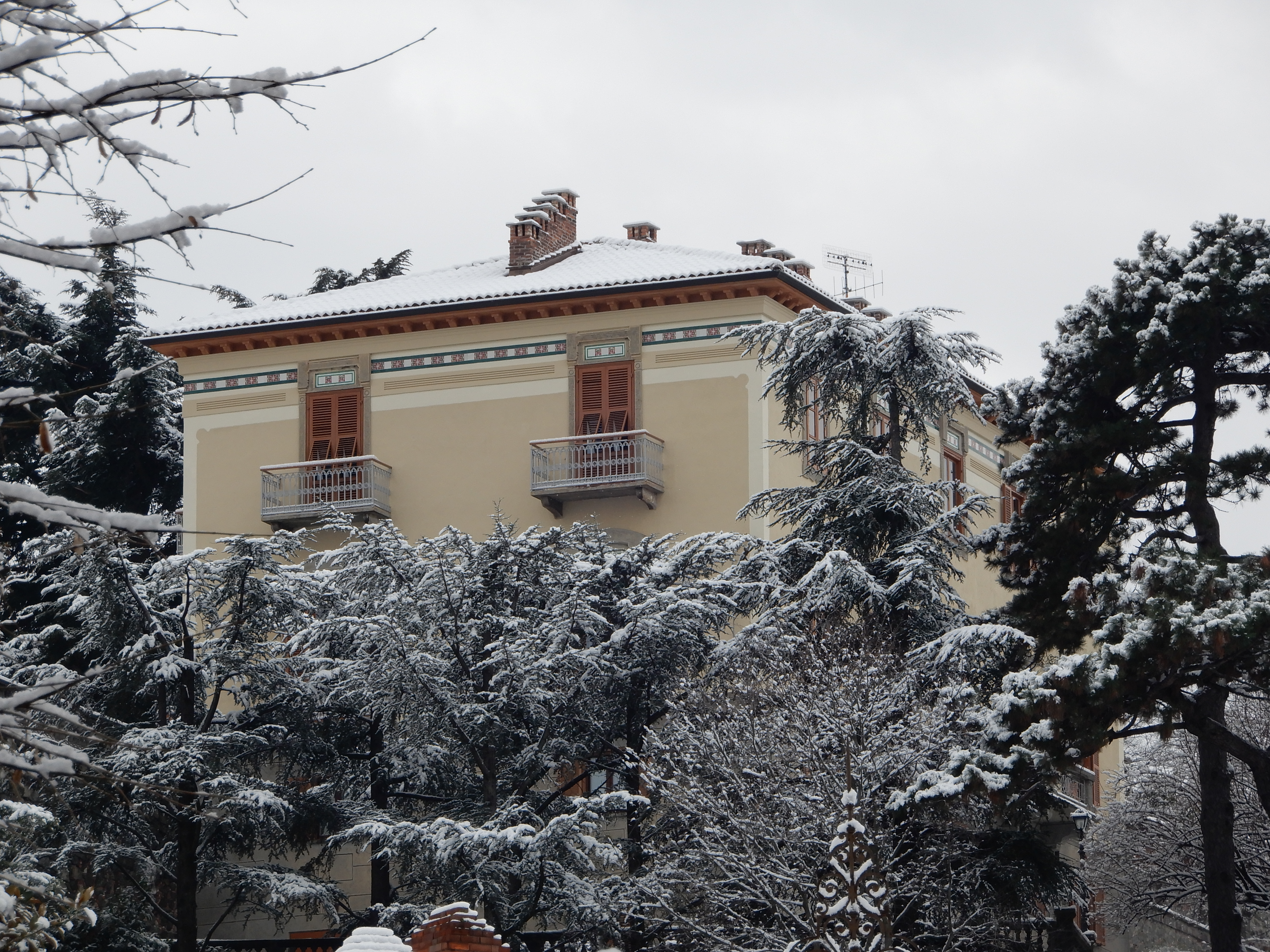
