= Villa Casana =

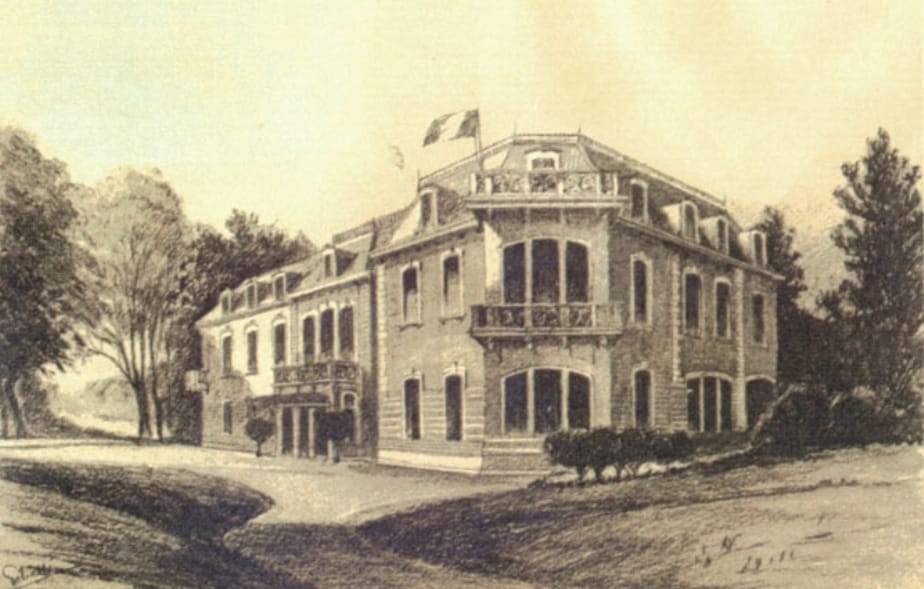
- Villa Casana in Ivrea
- Click on the map for a fullscreen view

General information
- Location: Ivrea, Italy
- Coordinates: 45°27′33.97″N 7°52′13.14″E

Villa Casana, previously known as Villa Carpenetto, is a historic villa located in Ivrea, Italy.

== History ==
The villa was built in the early 20th century as a vacation residence by Marquis Edoardo Coardi di Carpenetto, a lieutenant general of the cavalry in the Italian army. He used to spend the period from early July until All Saints' Day there with his wife, Maria Sofia, a noblewoman from the Ruffo di Calabria family, and their children, before returning to Rome where the family resided for the rest of the year.

In 1927, the villa passed to Cavalier Vittorio Casana, whose name it still bears. During the Nazi-Fascist occupation of Northern Italy, it was seized by the Germans and used as one of their command headquarters, just like Villa Ravera on Corso Costantino Nigra. In 1952, the property was purchased by the Olivetti company, which renovated it by extending it by an additional floor, and repurposed it first for office use and later as a preschool.

Since 1987, the villa has been home to the Olivetti Historical Archive.

== Description ==
The villa stands on a hill, offering a view of the town of Ivrea and the mountains of the Aosta and Chiusella Valley.
