= Railway Bridge, Ivrea =

Ivrea Railway Bridge
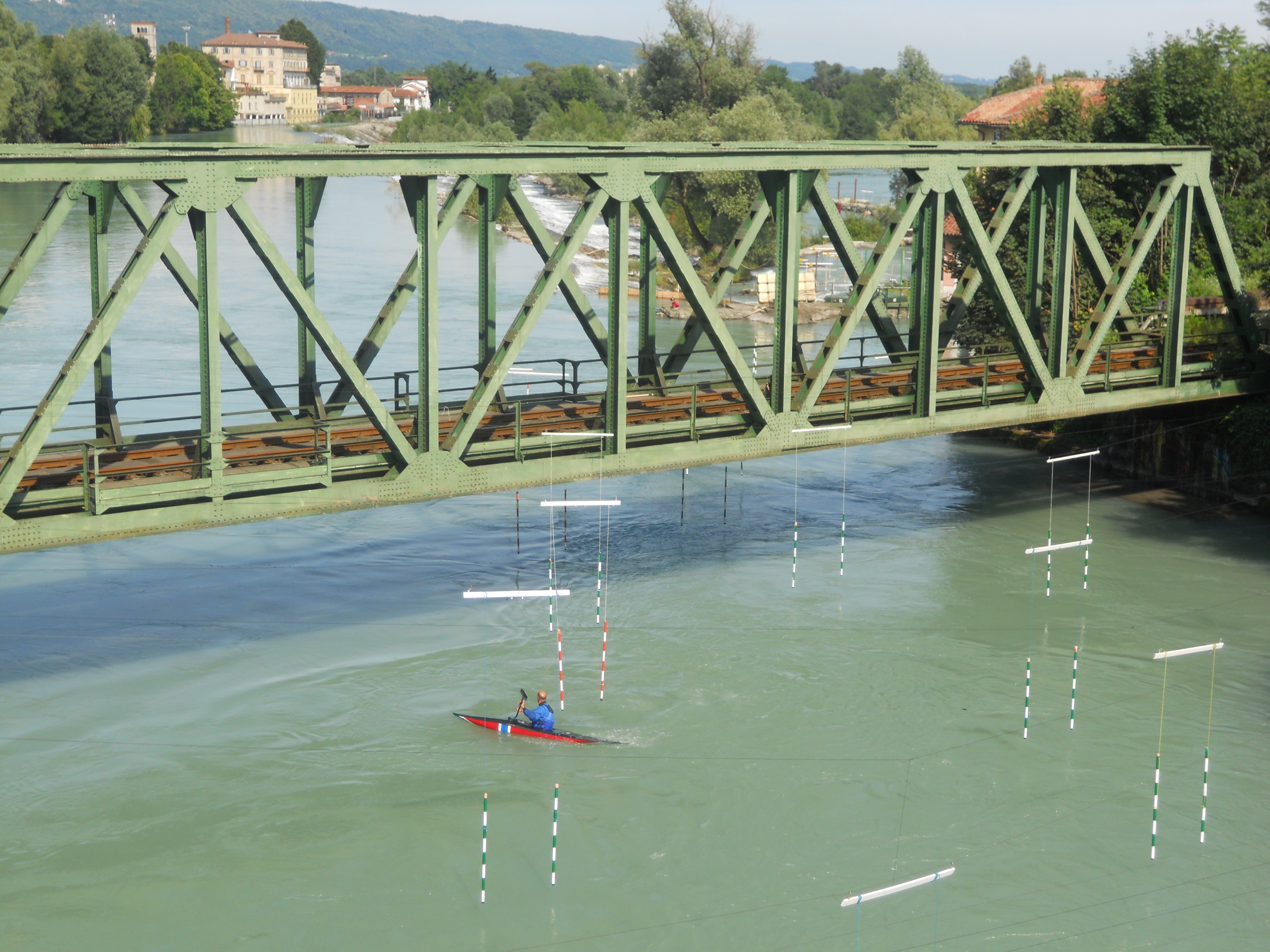
- Coordinates: 45.465°N 7.8729°E
- Carries: Chivasso–Ivrea–Aosta railway
- Crosses: Dora Baltea
- Locale: Ivrea, Italy

Characteristics
- Design: truss bridge

Location
- Interactive map of Ivrea Railway Bridge

The Ivrea Railway Bridge is a truss railway bridge over the Dora Baltea in Ivrea, Italy.

== History ==
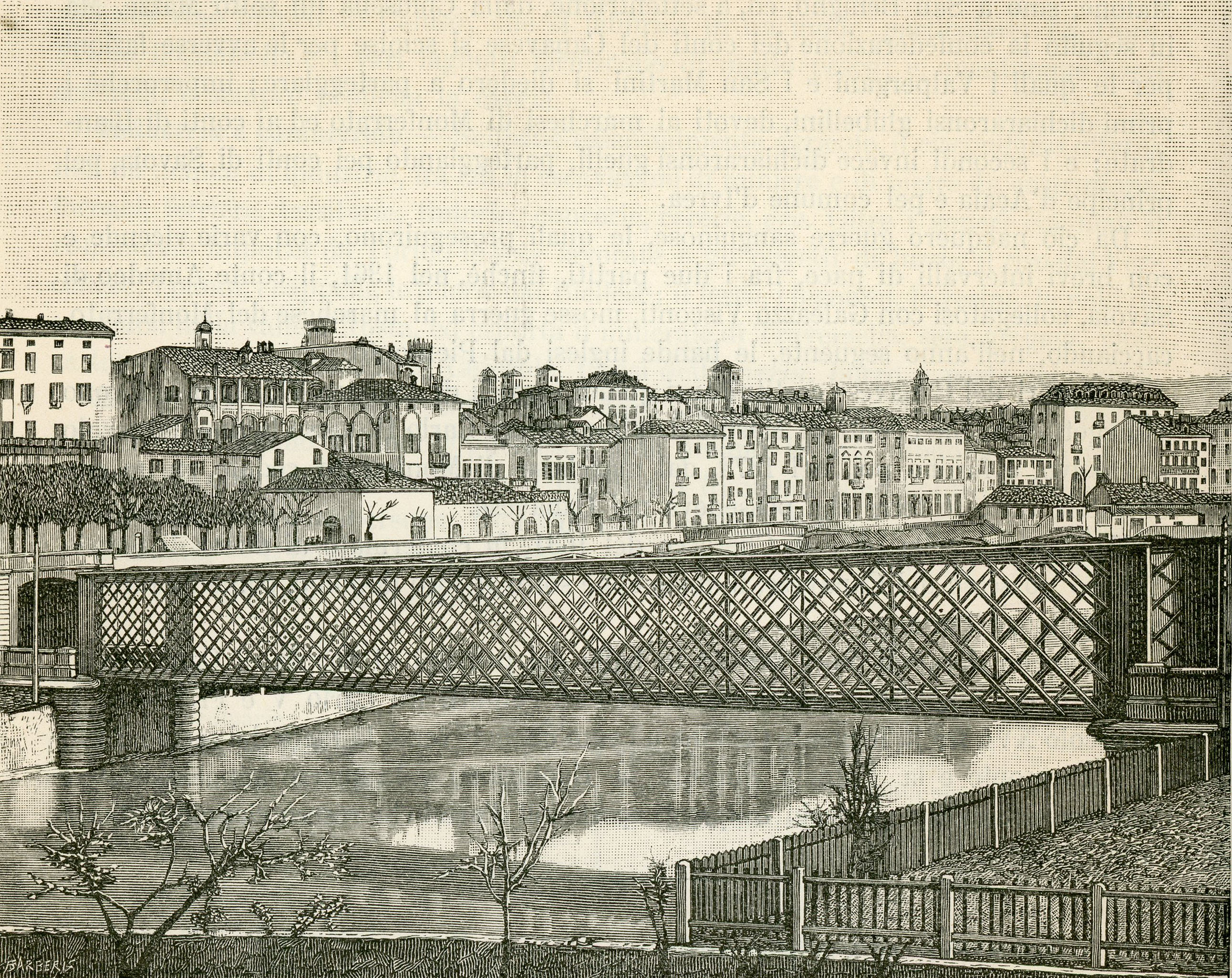
The original lattice truss bridge circa 1890

The bridge was built as part of the development of the railway line between Ivrea and Aosta, officially inaugurated, along with the bridge, on July 4, 1886. The bridge, originally a lattice truss design, was assembled on-site on the right bank of the Dora Baltea, then moved into its final position using a temporary wooden structure built in the middle of the river as support.

In the night of December 23 to 24, 1944, during the Nazi-Fascist occupation of northern Italy, the bridge was blown up by Italian partisan forces to prevent an Allied air bombing aimed at disrupting the supply of war materials from the Cogne steelworks in Aosta, and which would have severely damaged the town of Ivrea.

A new truss bridge was built after the end of the conflict, being inaugurated on May 25, 1959.

== Description ==
The bridge is located at the last useful point before the bed of the Dora Baltea widens again after being forced through a narrow gorge, just a few dozen meters downstream from the Ponte Nuovo. It is a truss bridge.
