= Châtillon station =

Châtillon station may refer to:

== Stations in France ==
- Châtillon-d'Azergues station, an SNCF station in Auvergne-Rhône-Alpes
- Châtillon-en-Michaille station, see Ligne du Haut-Bugey § Stations and halts
- Châtillon-sur-Seine station, see Laignes
- Marlieux—Châtillon station, Marlieux, Ain department

== Stations in Italy ==
- Châtillon-Saint-Vincent railway station, a railway station in the Aosta Valley

== See also ==
- Châtillon (disambiguation)
