= Palazzo Ravera =

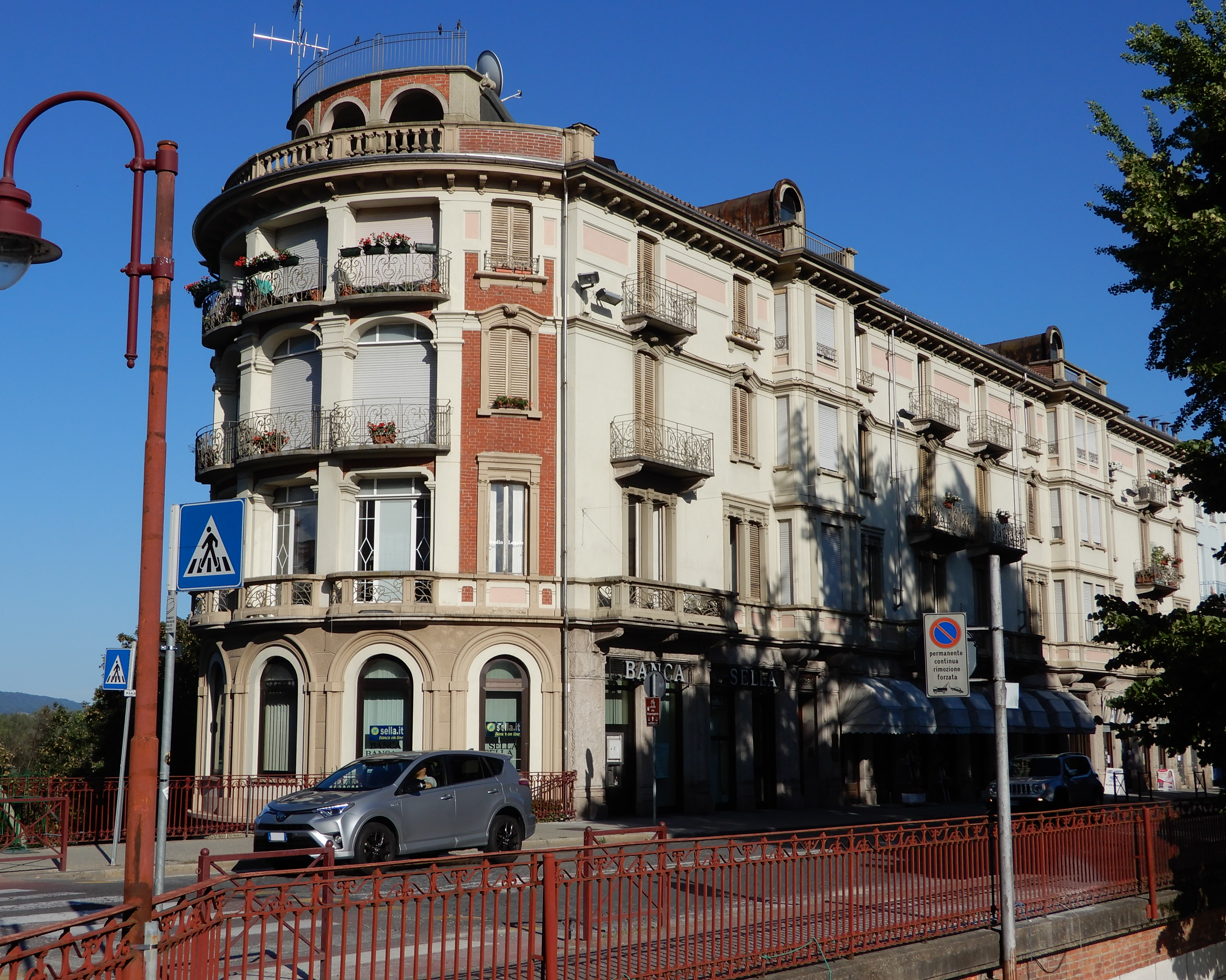
- Palazzo Ravera in 2020
- Click on the map for a fullscreen view

General information
- Location: Ivrea, Italy
- Coordinates: 45°27′52.5″N 7°52′21.4″E

Palazzo Ravera is a historic Art Nouveau building located in Ivrea, Italy.

== History ==
The building was commissioned by Stefano Ravera, an entrepreneur from a well-known family of builders from the local Canavese area. This came after his frequent visits to Switzerland, where he was impressed by the grand nineteenth-century buildings of Geneva and Zurich. He entrusted the project to Ivrea engineer Romolo Peona; this also held the position of City Councillor for Public Works.

The name of the building is also inseparably linked to that of the hotel that operated in its rooms until its closing in 1989, the Hotel Dora. The hotel was frequented by the high society of Ivrea and the Olivetti managerial class. In 1957, painter Ottone Rosai was found dead from natural causes in a room on the first floor of the hotel.

Today, the building houses a bank, offices, and commercial activities.

== Description ==
The building is located on Corso Costantino Nigra, opposite Villa Luisa.

The main characteristic of the building, which features an Art Nouveau style, is represented by the northern facade, which is cylindrical and overhangs the underlying Dora Baltea river, just downstream from the Ponte Nuovo.

== Gallery ==
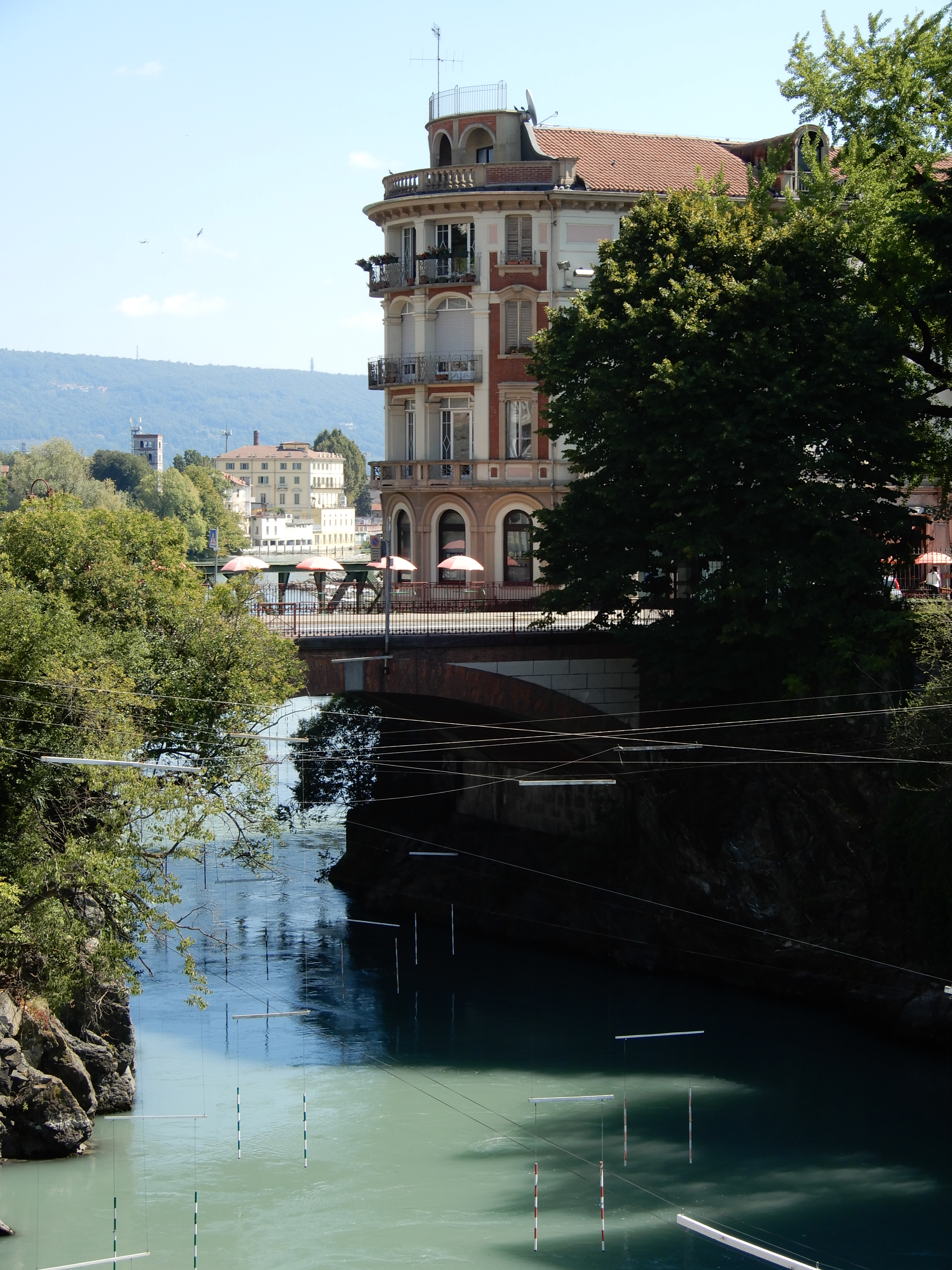

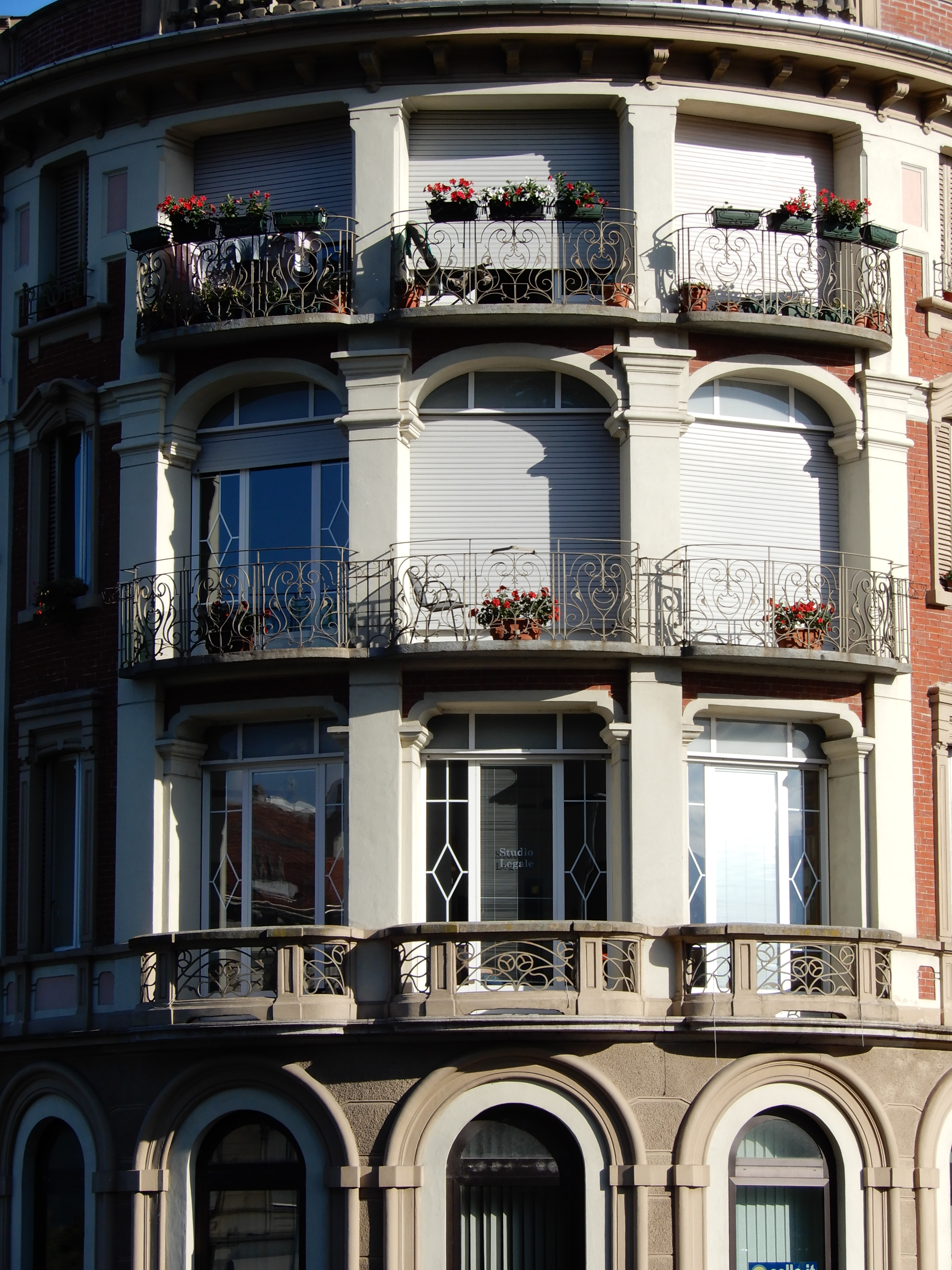

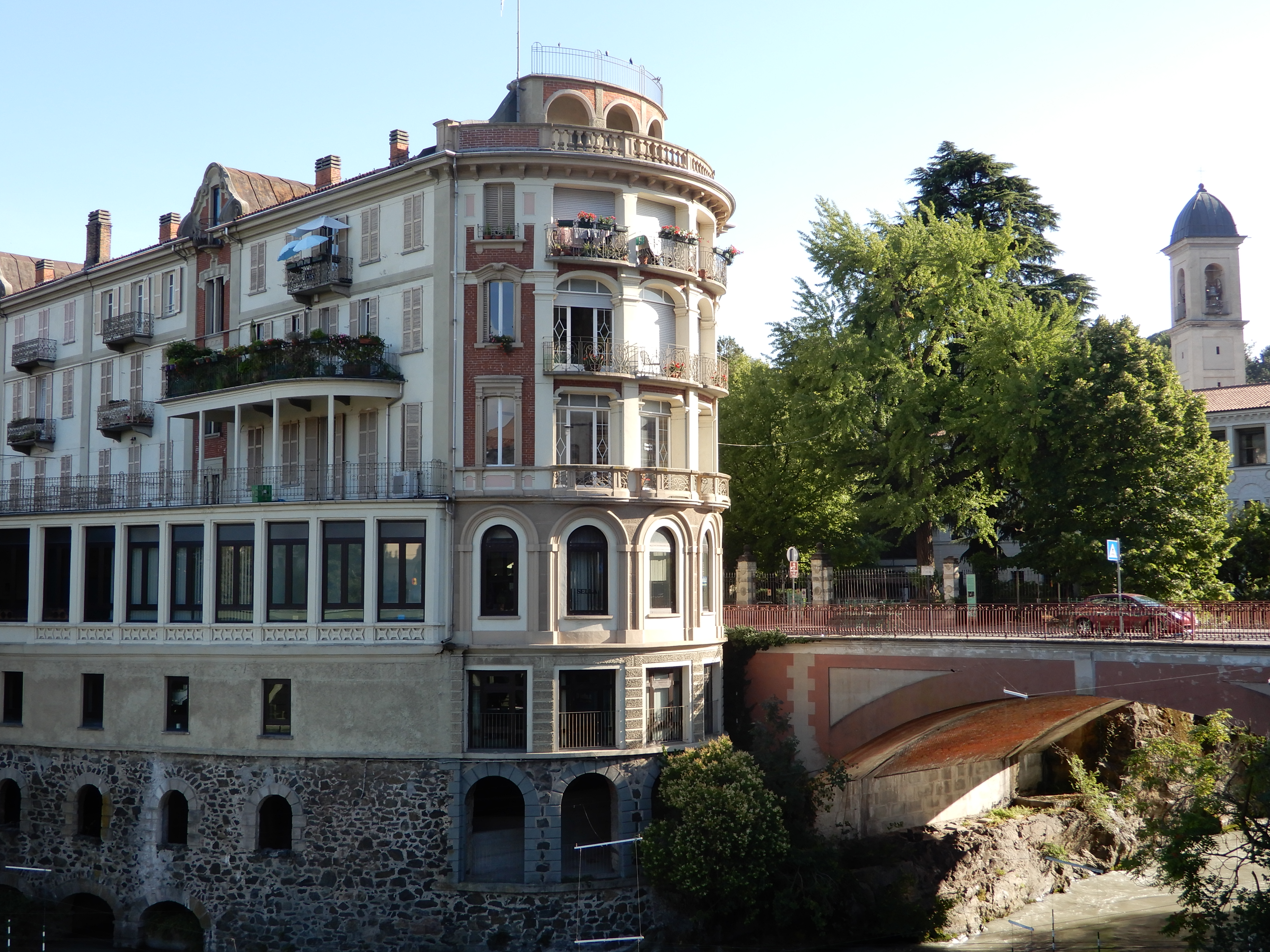
