= Aosta/Aoste railway station =

Railway station serving the city of Aosta/Aoste

Aosta Aoste
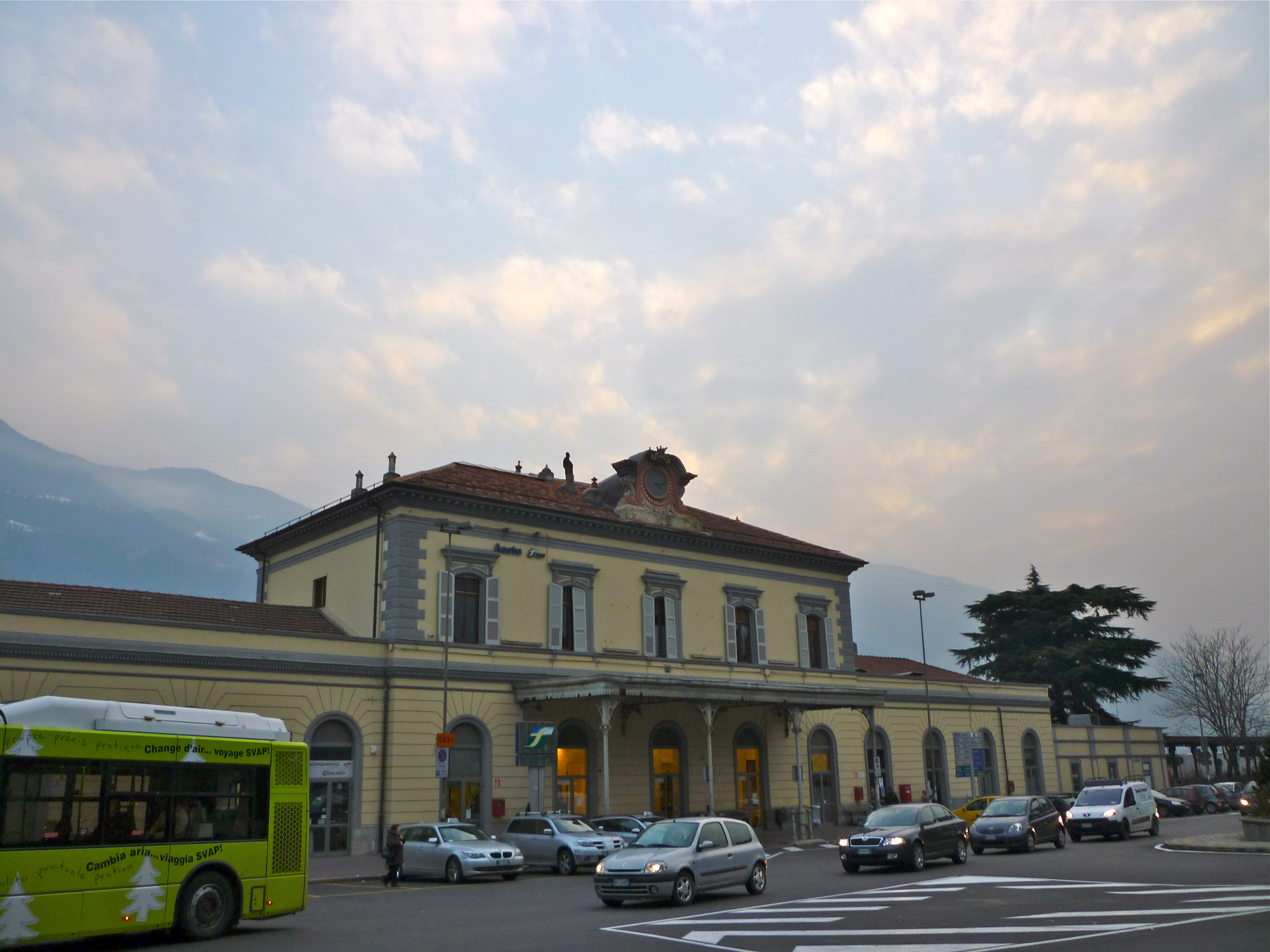
- The passenger building.

General information
- Location: Piazza/Place Innocenzo Manzetti; 11100 Aosta/Aoste; Aosta, Aosta Valley; Italy
- Coordinates: 45°44′03″N 07°19′21″E
- Operator: Rete Ferroviaria Italiana; Centostazioni
- Lines: Chivasso–Ivrea–Aosta; Aosta–Pré-Saint-Didier
- Distance: 98.619 km (61.279 mi) from Chivasso
- Train operators: Trenitalia
- Connections: Urban (SVAP)and suburban (SAVDA) buses

Other information
- Classification: Gold

History
- Opened: 1886; 140 years ago
Location
- Location within Aosta Valley Location within Northern Italy Location within Italy

Aosta/Aoste railway station (Italian: Stazione di Aosta, French: Gare d'Aoste) is the main station serving the city and comune of Aosta, in the autonomous region of Aosta Valley, northwestern Italy. Opened in 1886, it forms part of the Chivasso–Ivrea–Aosta railway, and is also a junction station for a branch line to Pré-Saint-Didier, in the Valdigne, on the way towards Courmayeur.

The station is currently managed by Rete Ferroviaria Italiana (RFI). However, the commercial area of the passenger building is managed by Centostazioni. Train services to and from the station are operated by Trenitalia. Each of these companies is a subsidiary of Ferrovie dello Stato Italiane (FS), Italy's state-owned rail company.

== Location ==
Aosta railway station is situated in the southern part of the city, a few hundred metres (yards) from the central Émile Chanoux square (town hall square), to which it is linked by Avenue Conseil des Commis.

== Features ==
The station has recently been renovated. It is composed of a single building with ticketing, waiting rooms, a cafe bar, a bistro restaurant and a tobacconist. A minor building, adjacent to the main one, is the headquarters of the railway police.

The station yard has eight tracks, of which five are dedicated to passenger trains, and faced by platforms equipped with steel canopies. Recently, Centrostazioni fitted the platforms and the subway to Via Paravera with illuminated signs indicating destinations and schedules.

There is no goods shed at the station. In recent years, the only goods traffic passing through the station has been consignments of slate, widely used for roofing in the Aosta Valley, and cargoes of waste, particularly of scrap metal, from Cogne Aciers spéciaux (CAS), a steelworks located near the station. The scrap metal was destined for foundries, and was transported several days a week by goods trains hauled by two D345 class diesel locomotives (one at each end of the train) or the new D242 class diesel locomotives.

Until 2001–2002, the station was managed in collaboration with military railway engineers (who were involved in the management of the Chivasso–Aosta railway).

== Train services ==
The station is served by the following service:

- Express services (Regionale Veloce) Turin - Chivasso – Ivrea – Aosta
- Regional services (Treno regionale) Ivrea - Aosta

== Passenger and train movements ==
The station has about one million passenger movements each year. It is used mainly by students attending colleges in the Aosta Valley, by commuters and by tourists.

The main destinations for passengers are Turin, Chivasso, Ivrea.

== Interchange ==
Innocent Manzetti square, in front of the station, is the terminus for the majority of Aosta's urban and suburban bus lines.

Near the square is the Georges Carrel parking station, and Aosta bus station, the terminus of the bus lines of the SAVDA company.

== Gallery ==
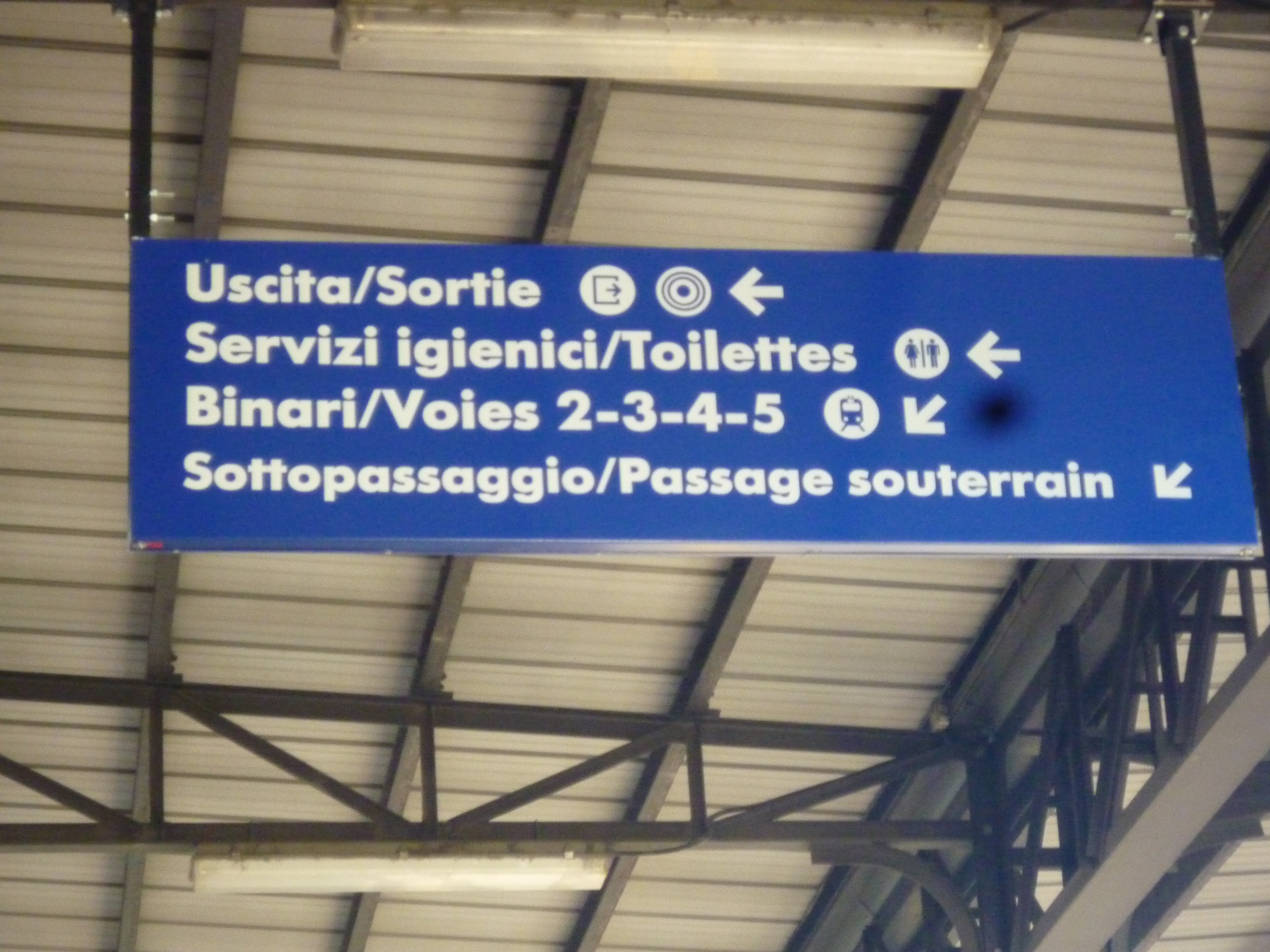
Bilingual Italian-French sign in the station.

== See also ==
- History of rail transport in Italy
- List of railway stations in Aosta Valley
- Rail transport in Italy
- Railway stations in Italy
