= San Grato Vescovo, Ivrea =

San Grato Vescovo
- Chiesa di San Grato Vescovo (Italian)
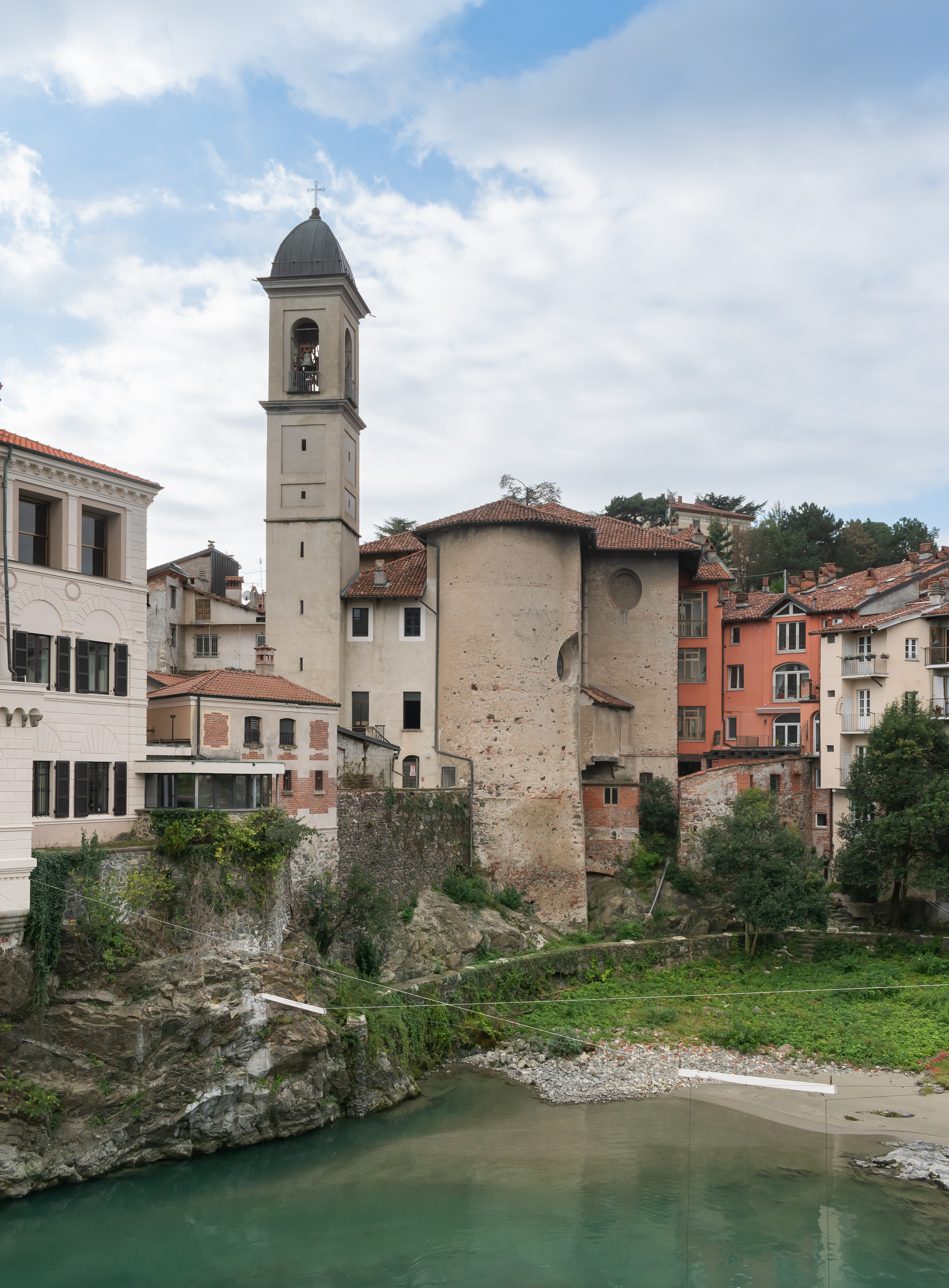
- San Grato Vescovo, Ivrea in 2021
- Click on the map for a fullscreen view
- 45°27′50.49″N 7°52′17.46″E
- Country: Italy
- Denomination: Roman Catholic

Architecture
- Functional status: Active

Administration
- Diocese: Diocese of Ivrea

San Grato Vescovo is a Roman Catholic church located in Ivrea, Italy.

== History ==
The church was built in the 18th century in the Borghetto district of Ivrea, outside the city walls, and is dedicated Gratus of Aosta, the second bishop of Aosta.

== Description ==
The church is located in the Borghetto district of Ivrea, Piedmont, overlooking the waters of the Dora Baltea river near the Ponte Vecchio. Situated south of the river, it faces northeast. The neoclassical facade is characterized by Ionic pilasters and is divided into two sections. The lower section features the entrance portal, which opens onto Via Guido Gozzano, while the upper section contains a large rose window with stained glass that illuminates the interior. The facade is crowned by a large broken pediment. The bell tower rises in a recessed position to the right, with its belfry featuring four single-lancet windows and topped by a curved, square-based pyramid roof. The apse of the church overlooks the right bank of the Dora Baltea.
