= List of railway stations in Aosta Valley =

Railway stations list

This is the list of the railway stations in the Aosta Valley owned by Rete Ferroviaria Italiana, a branch of the Italian state company Ferrovie dello Stato.

== List ==
Station name	Locality	Province	Category
Aosta	Aosta	Aosta Valley	Gold
Arvier	Arvier	Aosta Valley	Bronze
Avise	Avise	Aosta Valley	Bronze
Châtillon - Saint-Vincent	Châtillon	Aosta Valley	Silver
Derby	Derby	Aosta Valley	Bronze
Donnas	Donnas	Aosta Valley	Bronze
Hône-Bard	Hône	Aosta Valley	Bronze
La Salle	La Salle	Aosta Valley	Bronze
Morgex	Morgex	Aosta Valley	Bronze
Nus	Nus	Aosta Valley	Bronze
Pont-Saint-Martin	Pont-Saint-Martin	Aosta Valley	Silver
Pré-Saint-Didier	Pré-Saint-Didier	Aosta Valley	Bronze
Saint-Pierre	Saint-Pierre	Aosta Valley	Bronze
Sarre	Sarre	Aosta Valley	Bronze
Verrès	Verrès	Aosta Valley	Silver
Villeneuve	Villeneuve	Aosta Valley	Bronze

== See also ==
- Railway stations in Italy
- Ferrovie dello Stato
- Rail transport in Italy
- High-speed rail in Italy
- Transport in Italy
