= Chivasso–Ivrea–Aosta railway =

Railway line in Italy

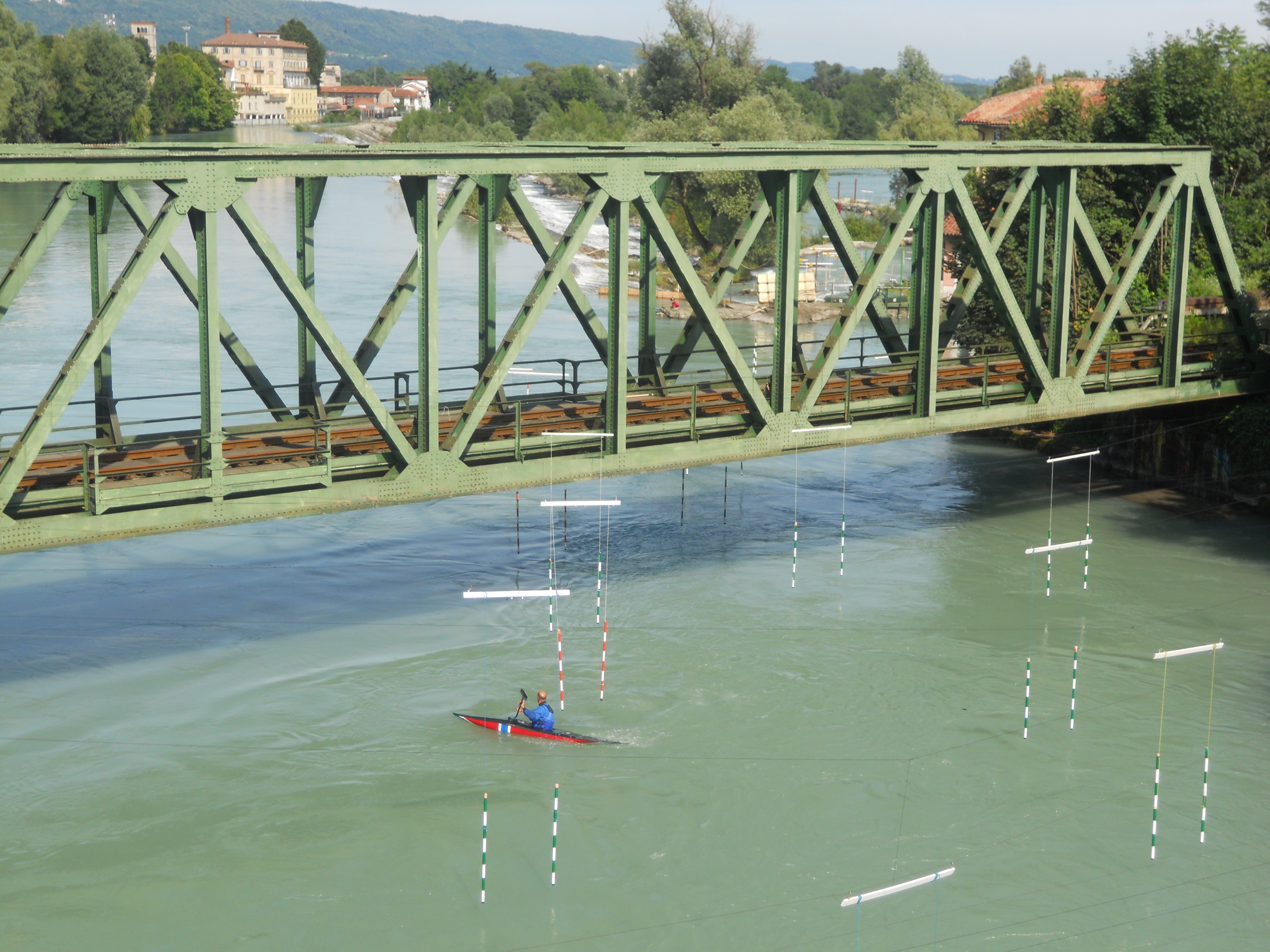
- The railway bridge over the river Dora Baltea

Overview
- Status: in use
- Owner: RFI
- Line number: 5
- Locale: Italy
- Termini: Chivasso railway station; Aosta railway station
- Stations: 11 station, 3 stops

Service
- Type: Heavy rail
- Operator(s): Trenitalia

History
- Opened: 5 July 1886

Technical
- Line length: 100 km (62 mi)
- Number of tracks: 1
- Track gauge: 1,435 mm (4 ft 8 1/2 in) standard gauge

The Chivasso–Ivrea–Aosta railway is a railway line that links the regions of Piedmont and Aosta Valley in Italy. It was inaugurated from 1858 to 1886. The railway was operated by the Italian Armys Ferrovieri Engineer Regiment from 1915 to 1943 and 1949 to 2001.

== See also ==
- List of railway lines in Italy
