= Ivrea railway station =

Railway station in North Eastern Italy

Ivrea
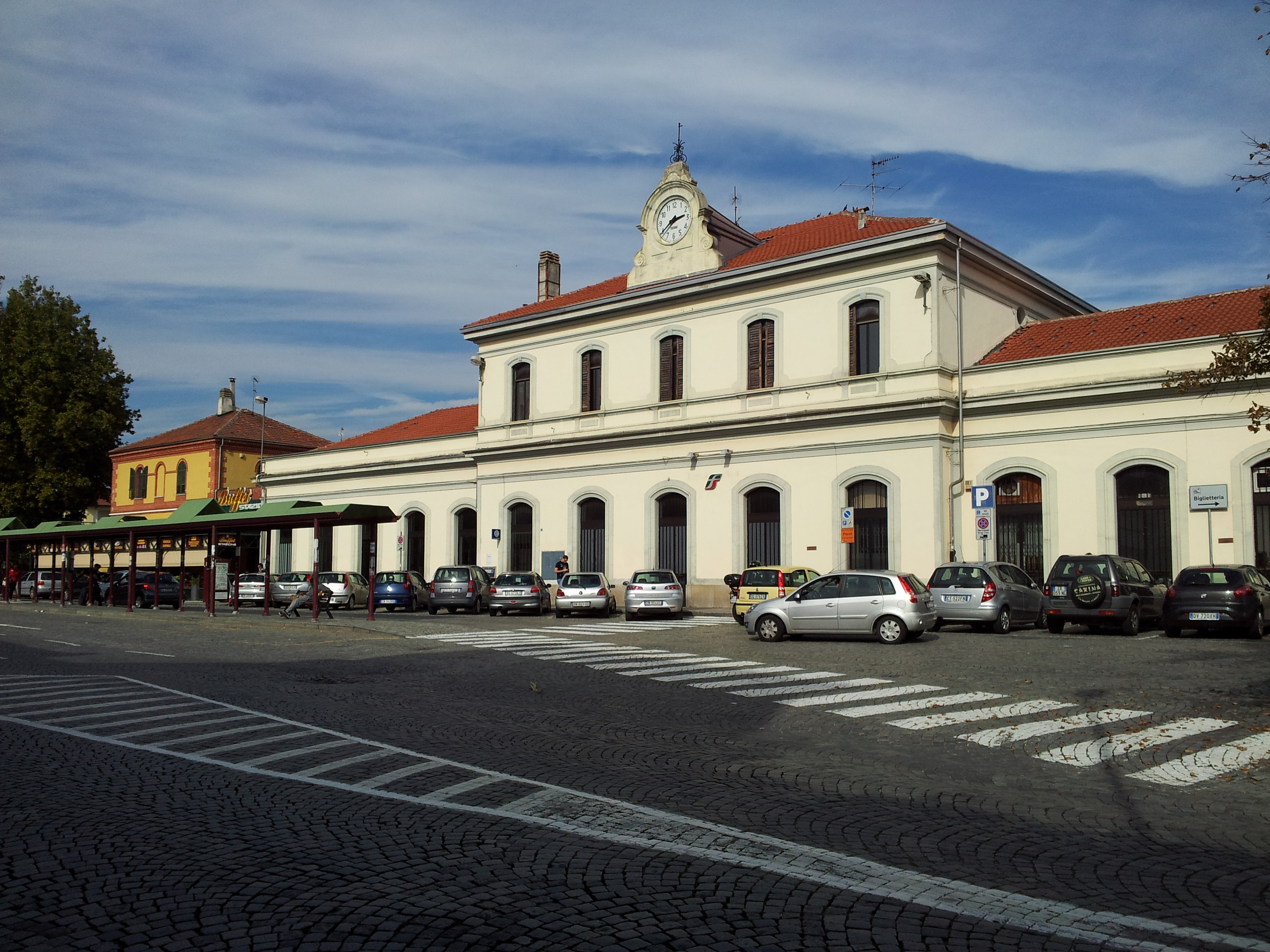
- The passenger building.

General information
- Location: Corso Nigra, 73; 10015 Ivrea TO; Ivrea, Metropolitan City of Turin, Piedmont; Italy
- Coordinates: 45°27′41″N 07°52′34″E
- Operator: Rete Ferroviaria Italiana
- Line: Chivasso–Aosta
- Distance: 32.431 km (20.152 mi) from Chivasso
- Platforms: 3
- Train operators: Trenitalia
- Connections: Suburban buses

Other information
- Classification: Silver

History
- Opened: 5 November 1858; 167 years ago
Location
- Location within Piedmont Location within Northern Italy Location within Italy

Ivrea railway station is the train station serving the town and comune of Ivrea, in the Piedmont region of northwestern Italy. It is the junction of the Chivasso–Aosta railway.

The station is currently managed by Rete Ferroviaria Italiana (RFI), while train services are operated by Trenitalia. Both companies are subsidiaries of Ferrovie dello Stato (FS), Italy's state-owned rail company.

== History ==
The station was opened on 5 November 1858, upon the inauguration the second part of the Chivasso–Ivrea–Aosta railway, from Caluso to Ivrea.

== Features ==
Four tracks, three of which are equipped with platforms, overpass the station.

== Regional links ==
The station is served by the following service:

- Express services (Regionale Veloce) Turin - Chivasso – Ivrea – Aosta
- Regional services (Treno regionale) Novara - Chivasso - Ivrea
- Regional services (Treno regionale) Chivasso - Ivrea
- Regional services (Treno regionale) Ivrea - Aosta

== See also ==
- History of rail transport in Italy
- List of railway stations in Piedmont
- Rail transport in Italy
- Railway stations in Italy
