= Ponte Vecchio, Ivrea =

Ponte Vecchio
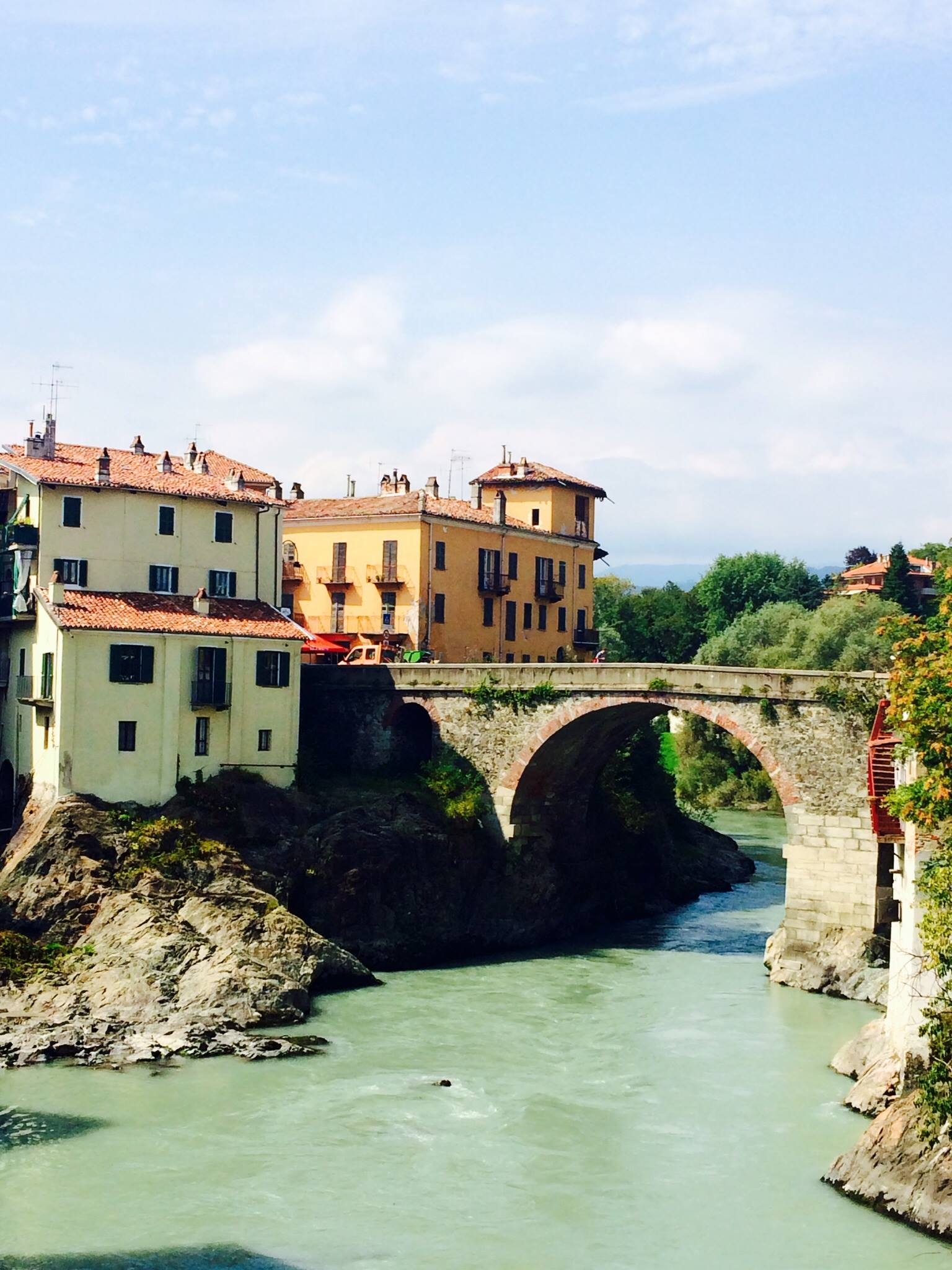
- Coordinates: 45.464639°N 7.871083°E
- Crosses: Dora Baltea
- Locale: Ivrea, Italy

Characteristics
- Design: stone and brick arch bridge
- Total length: 38 metres (125 ft)

Location
- Interactive map of Ponte Vecchio

The Ponte Vecchio is a stone and brick arch bridge over the Dora Baltea in Ivrea, Italy.

== History ==
Archaeological studies have shown that a bridge existed in this site as far back as at time of the Romans.

The bridge was destroyed and reconstructed several times across the centuries due to floods.

In 1704, it was demolished during the French siege of Ivrea to better defend the town. In 1716, Victor Amadeus II ordered its reconstruction. The bridge was later widened in 1830 by Charles Felix to improve traffic inflow and outflow from Ivrea. Nonetheless, in 1860 an additional bridge, the Ponte Nuovo, had to be built next to it to provide for additional capacity.

== Description ==
The structure consists of a triple-arch stone and brick bridge.

== Gallery ==
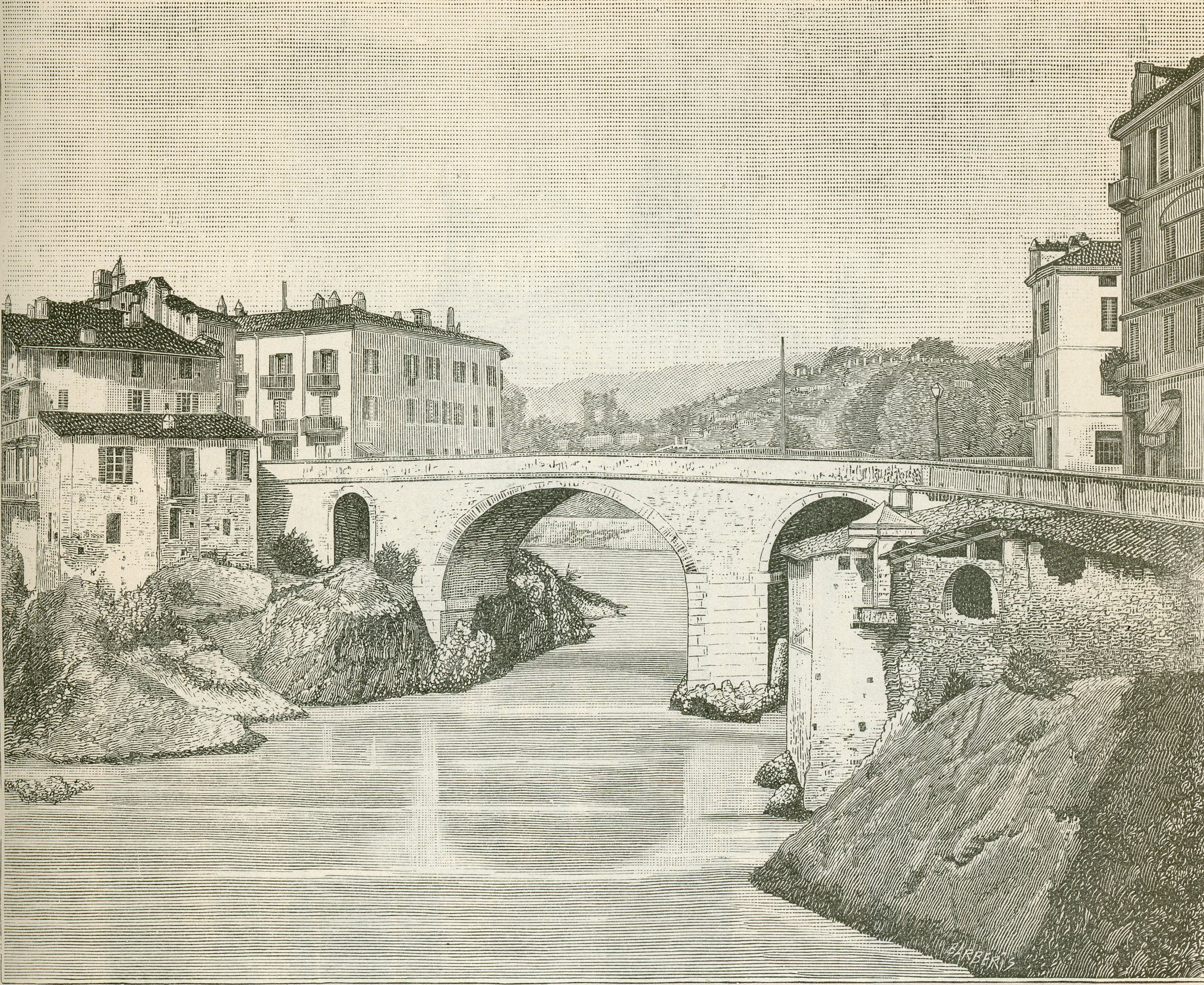

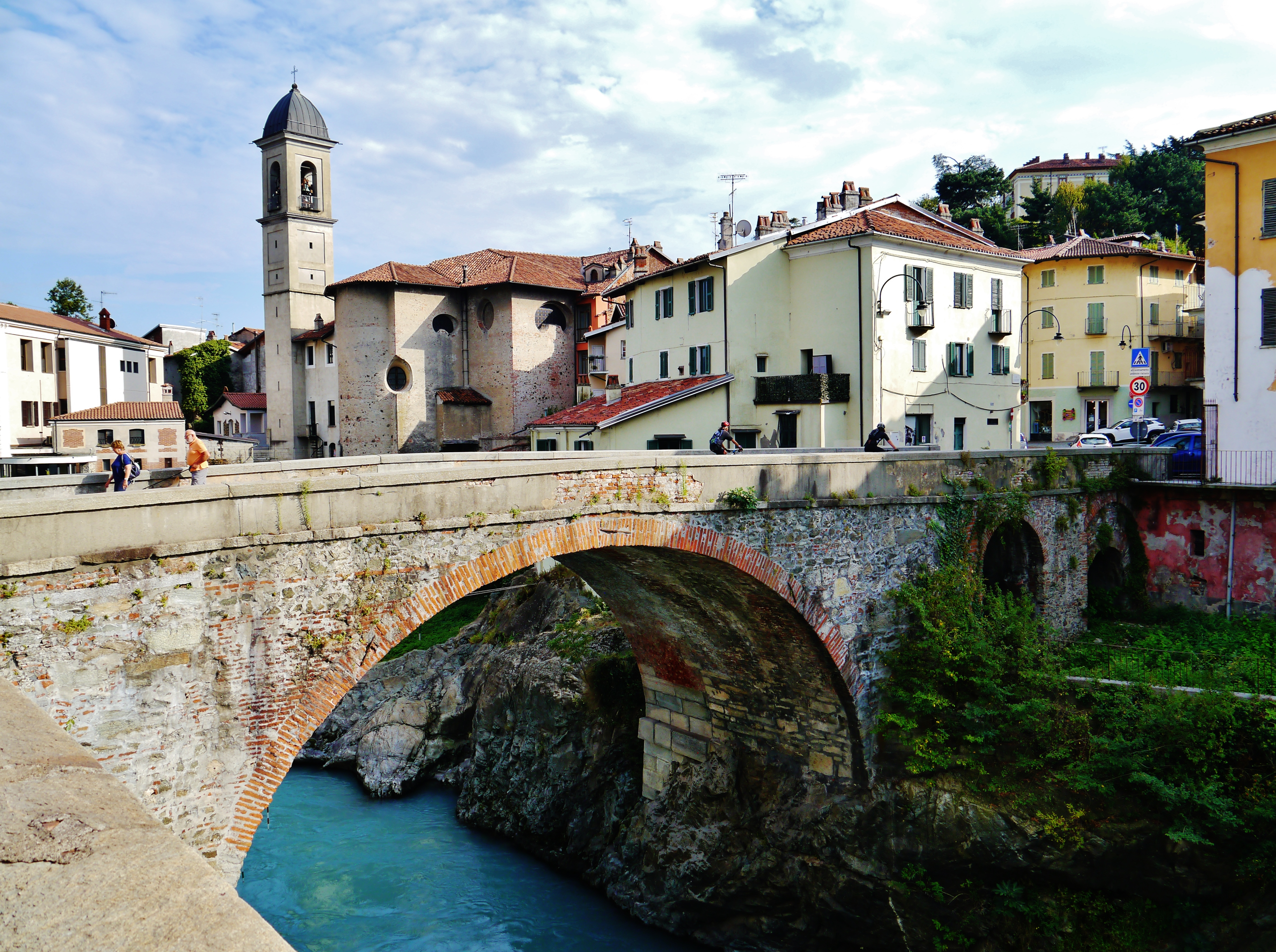

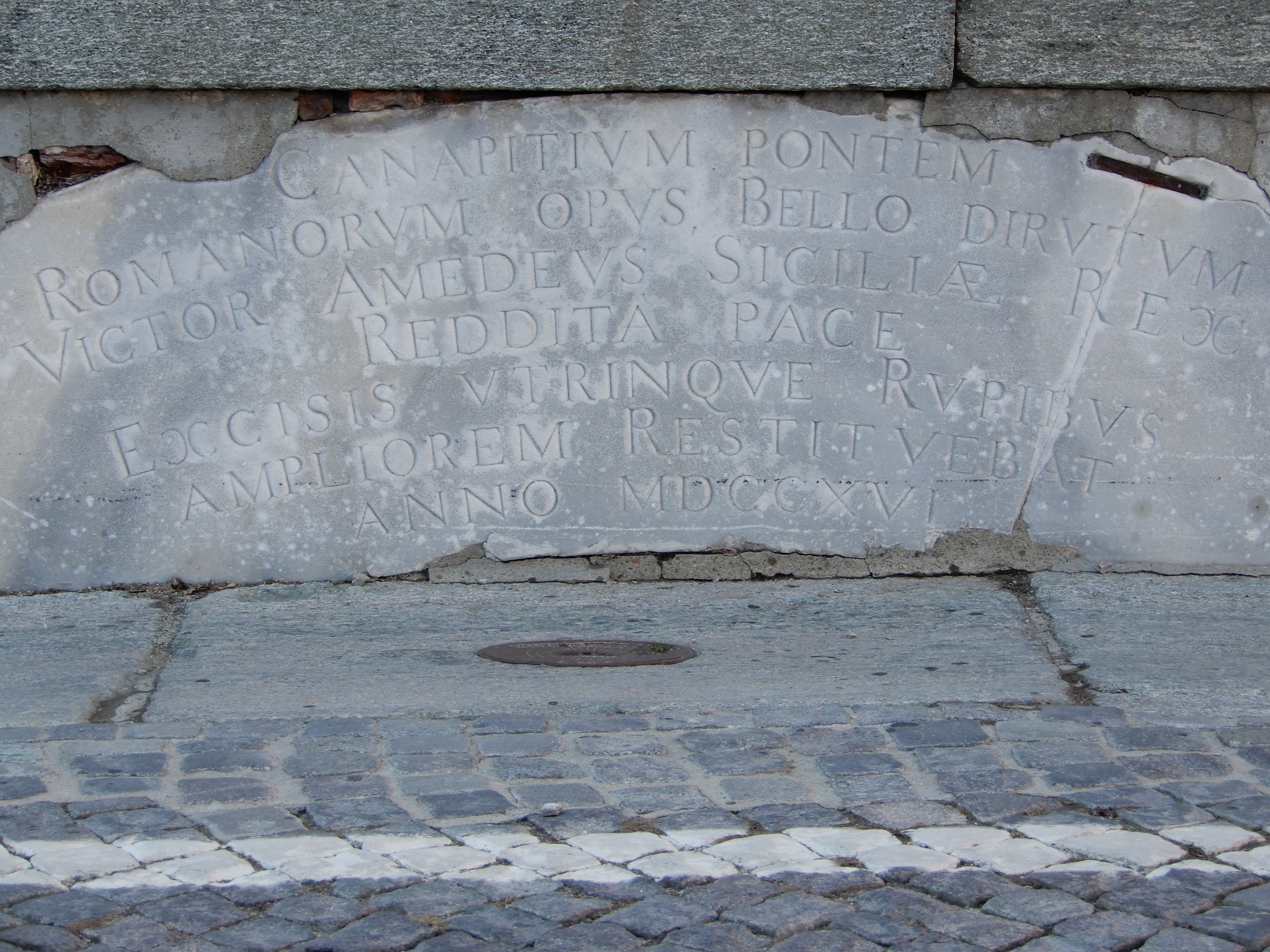
