= Ponte Nuovo, Ivrea =

Ponte Nuovo
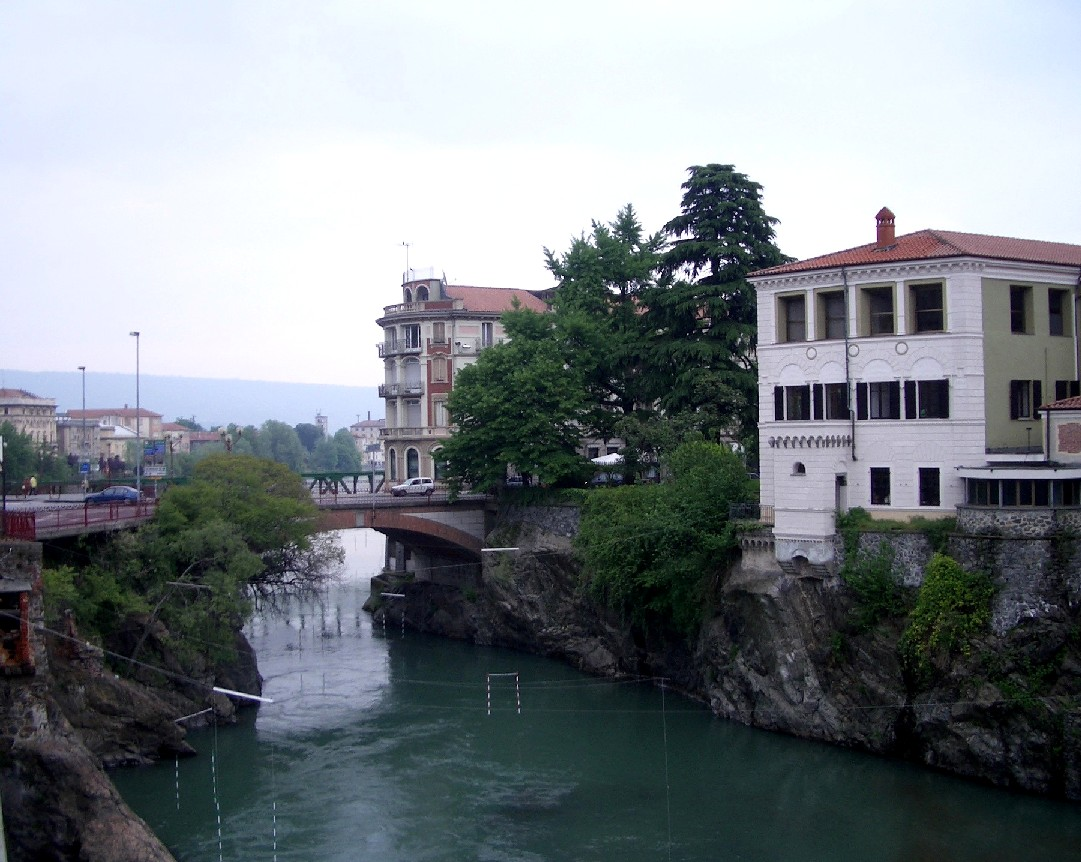
- Coordinates: 45.464692°N 7.872291°E
- Crosses: Dora Baltea
- Locale: Ivrea, Italy

Characteristics
- Design: arch bridge

The Ponte Nuovo is an arch bridge over the Dora Baltea in Ivrea, Italy.

== History ==
The construction of the bridge, designed by engineer Guallini and inaugurated in 1860, was carried out by the Meazza company. Its realization was part of a broader project to modernize the city of Ivrea, which until then had only one bridge, the Ponte Vecchio, which dated back to Roman times. The new bridge and its new avenue, Corso Costantino Nigra, absorbed the majority of the traffic, as they formed the new axis connecting the city center to the Ivrea railway station.

In 1917, the bridge was expanded with the construction of a sidewalk on the downstream side. In the 1950s, a sidewalk on the upstream side was also added.

On October 15, 1926, with a resolution of the city council the bridge was dedicated to Princess Isabella of Bavaria, Prince Tommaso, Duke of Genoa's wife. On December 18, 2010, on the fiftieth anniversary of his death, the bridge was then named after Adriano Olivetti.

== Description ==
The bridge is located at a point where the course of the Dora Baltea river is particularly narrow, just before the riverbed widens again, about a hundred meters downstream from the Ponte Vecchio and about fifty meters upstream from the Ivrea Railway Bridge. The structure consists of a single-arch bridge.
