= Dante (Turin Metro) =

Turin Metro station

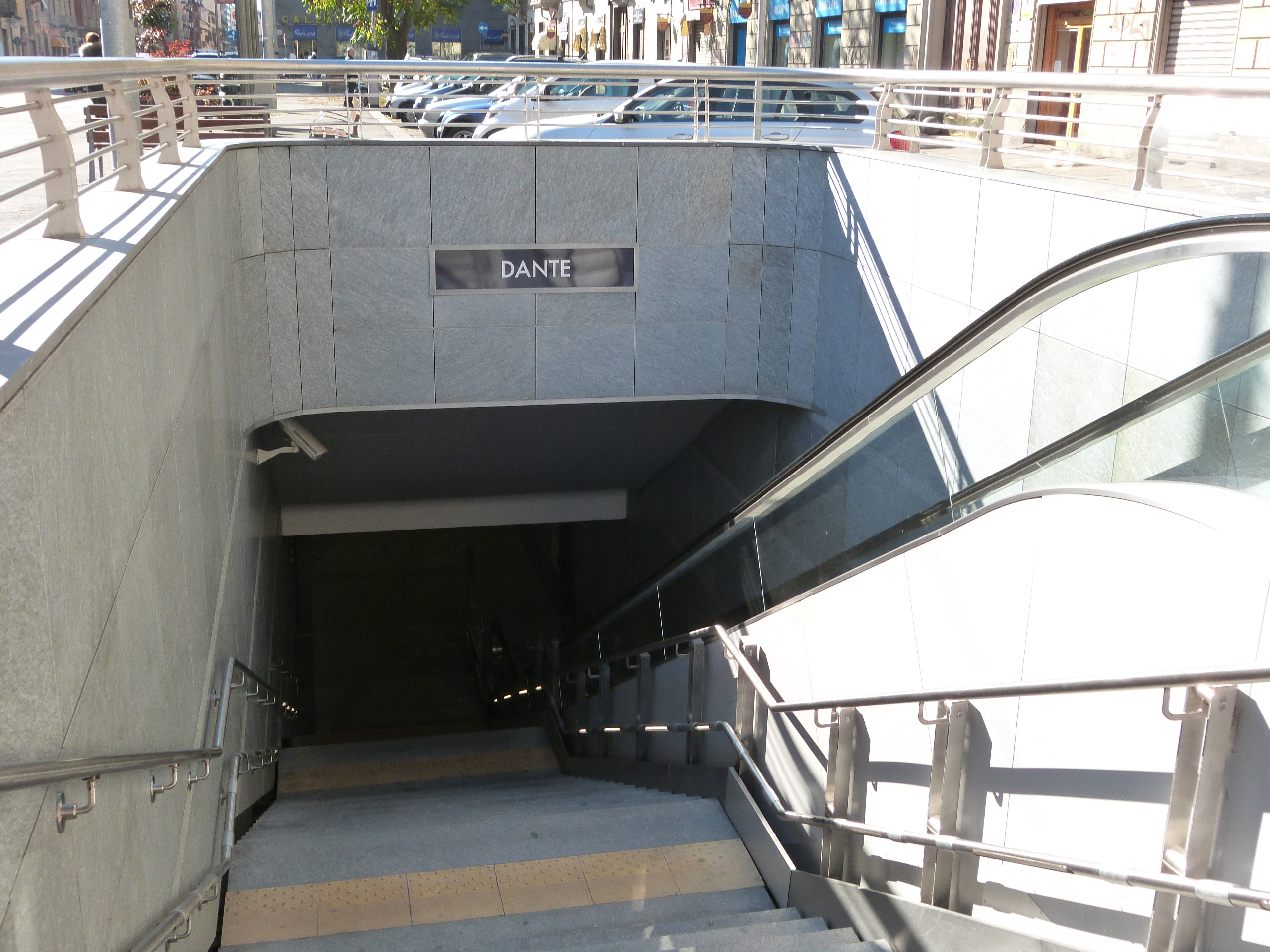

General information
- Location: Piazza Edmondo De Amicis, Turin
- Coordinates: 45°02′49″N 7°40′23″E
- Owner: GTT

Construction
- Structure type: Underground
- Accessible: Yes

History
- Opened: 6 March 2011

Services
Preceding station	Turin Metro	Following station
Nizza towards Fermi	Line 1	Carducci-Molinette towards Bengasi
Location

Dante is a station of the Turin Metro. The station was opened on 6 March 2011 as part of the Line 1 extension from Porta Nuova to Lingotto. It is in the busy, commercial district of central Turin, on the Piazza Edmondo De Amicis, near the intersection with Corso Dante Alighieri and Via Nizza. It is located within walking distance to the Castello del Valentino as well as the medical center of Torino, including the CTO Orthopedic Hospital.

== Services ==
- Ticket vending machines
- Handicap accessibility
- Elevators
- Escalators
- Active CCTV surveillance
