= Carducci-Molinette (Turin Metro) =

Turin Metro station

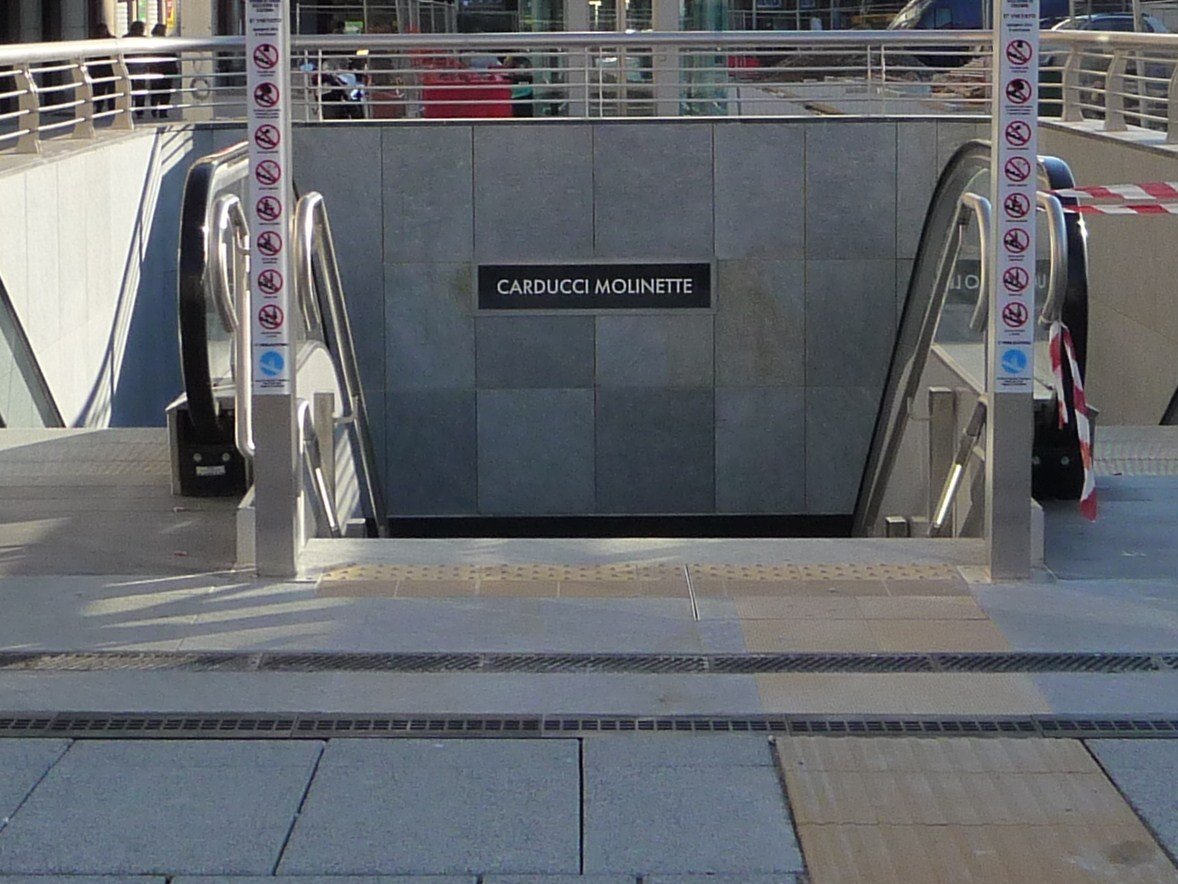

General information
- Location: Via Nizza, Turin
- Coordinates: 45°02′32″N 7°40′16″E
- Owner: GTT

Construction
- Structure type: Underground
- Accessible: Yes

History
- Opened: 6 March 2011

Services
Preceding station	Turin Metro	Following station
Dante towards Fermi	Line 1	Spezia towards Bengasi
Location

Carducci-Molinette is a station of the Turin Metro. The station was opened on 6 March 2011 as part of the Line 1 extension from Porta Nuova to Lingotto. Carducci-Molinette station is in the busy, commercial district of central Turin, between Via Nizza and Piazza Carducci (named after Giosuè Carducci), in the Molinette neighborhood. It is located within walking distance to the Torino Esposizioni and the CTO Hospital.

== Services ==
- Ticket vending machines
- Handicap accessibility
- Elevators
- Escalators
- Active CCTV surveillance
