= Spezia (Turin Metro) =

Turin Metro station

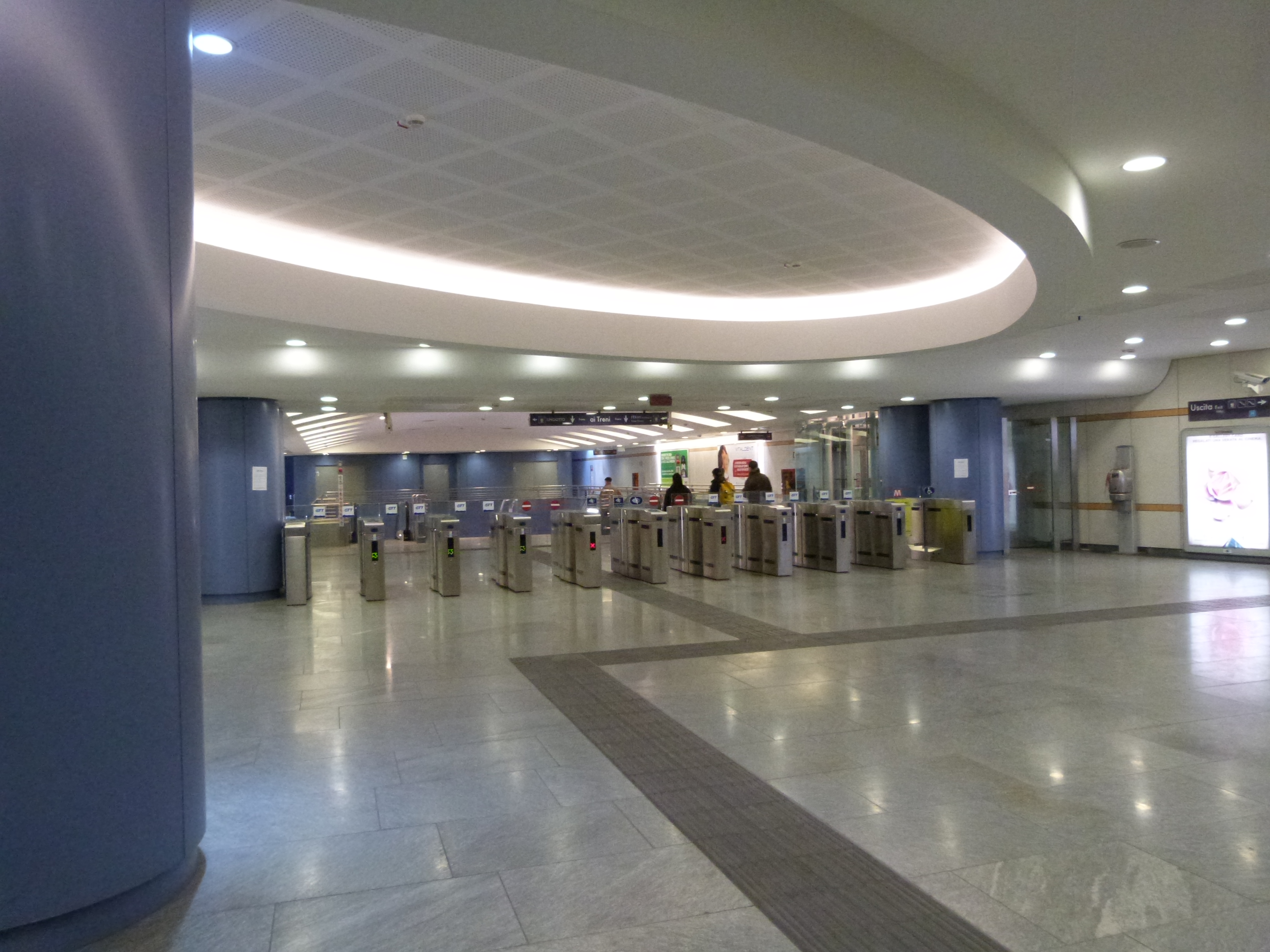
- Station interior

General information
- Location: Via Nizza, Turin
- Coordinates: 45°02′15″N 7°40′09″E
- Owner: GTT

Construction
- Structure type: Underground
- Accessible: Yes

History
- Opened: 6 March 2011

Services
Preceding station	Turin Metro	Following station
Carducci-Molinette towards Fermi	Line 1	Lingotto towards Bengasi
Location

Spezia is a station of the Turin Metro. The station was opened on 6 March 2011 as part of the Line 1 extension from Porta Nuova to Lingotto. Spezia station is in the busy, commercial district of south-central Turin, at the intersection between Via Nizza and Corso Spezia It is within walking distance of the Torino Lingotto, CTO Hospital and the Torino medical center.

== Services ==
- Ticket vending machines
- Handicap accessibility
- Elevators
- Escalators
- Active CCTV surveillance
