= Lingotto (neighbourhood) =

- Neighbourhood
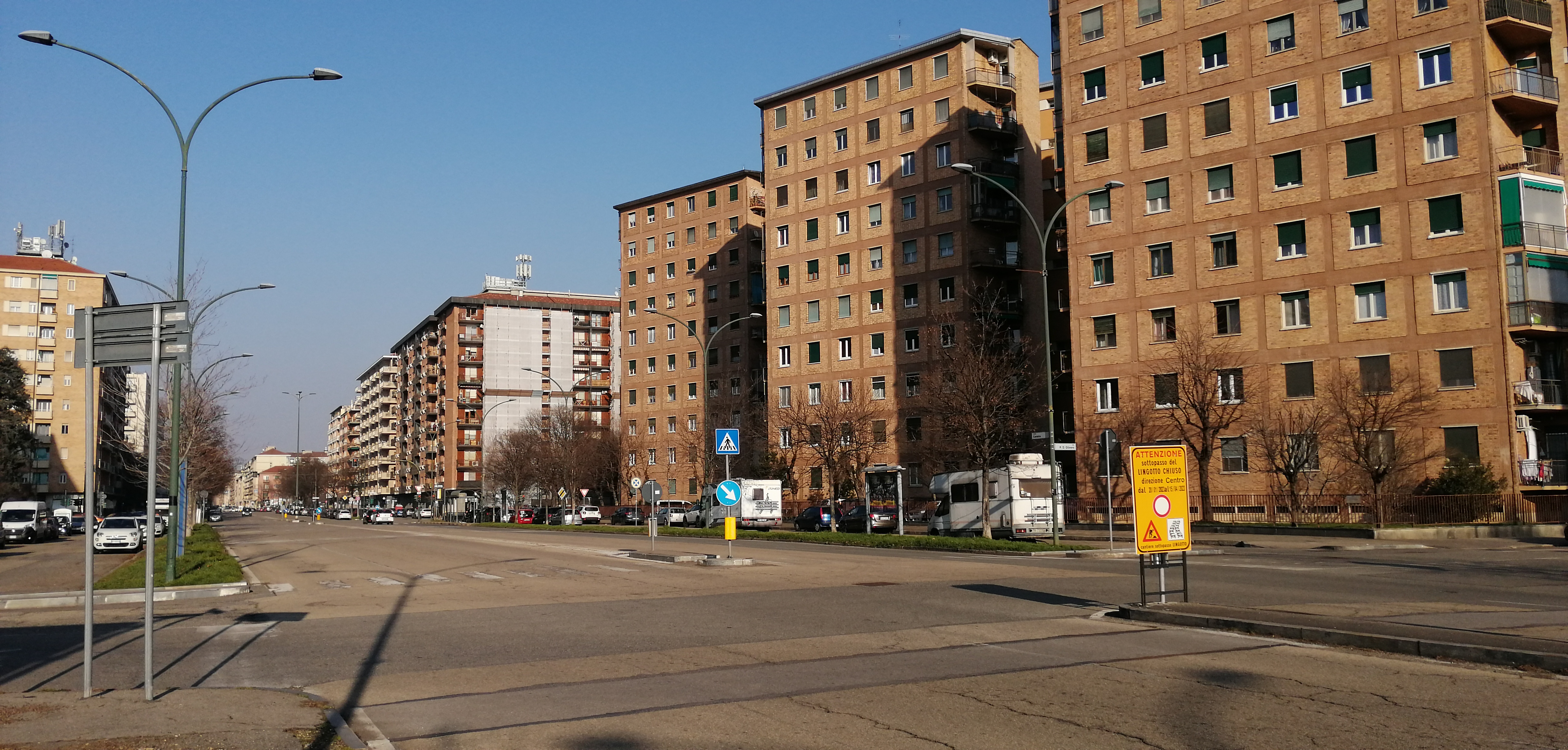
- A foreshortening of the Lingotto neighborhood
- Interactive map of Lingotto
- Coordinates: 45.0263°N 7.6486°E
- Country: Italy
- Region: Piemonte
- Province: Metropolitan City of Turin
- City: Turin

Lingotto is a neighbourhood in Turin, Italy. The district was first established in the 17th century and saw significant growth when the Fiat Lingotto plant opened. Lingotto contains the Parco Di Vittorio and is close to the Oval Lingotto and the Lingotto multifunctional complex.

== History ==
In pre-Roman times, the area around modern-day Lingotto was settled by the Celtic population of the Ligoni. Lingotto was established around the 15th century as a rural latifundium between Turin and Moncalieri, taking its name from the agricultural farmhouse that stood along the ancient road connecting Grugliasco to Moncalieri, the current Via Passo Buole.

At the beginning of the 17th century the village expanded as artisans and farmers moved in protected both by the feudal dominion of Vittorio Amedeo II of Savoy and by the Catholic diocese of Valfré, who evangelized much of the southern area of the Savoy capital. The small church of Lingotto, built in 1686 a few meters from the Cascina, was dedicated to John the Baptist and subsequently destroyed by the aerial bombings of 4 June 1944 during World War II, then replaced by the current Immacolata Concezione e San Giovanni Battista, consecrated in 1978.

In 1765, the area passed to Count Carlo Pietro Avenati of the Rebaudengo di Mondovì branch, under the protection of the Savoy. In 1788, the cemetery was annexed to the small Lingotto church, on the south side of the current via Passo Buole, where the Parco Di Vittorio municipal park now stands.

In 1915, the newly-established Fiat set up its car production plant on the remains of the ancient farm of Carlo Felice Nicolis, conte di Robilant which took the name of Fiat Lingotto. The factory soon became Fiat's main factory with the transfer of production from the previous workshops in Corso Dante. The district was completed only in 1922; industry quickly transformed the village, making it go from a rural place to a working-class neighborhood. From 1922 to 1936, the presence of Fiat Lingotto, before the birth of the Mirafiori plant, brought rapid economic development throughout the area. In 1982, the factory was closed down as the Fiat Mirafiori plant made it obsolete in the late 1970s.

In preparation for the 2006 Winter Olympics, the district saw the nearby addition of the Oval Lingotto and the renovation of the old Fiat Lingotto plant into a multifunctional complex. Since the 2006 Olympics, the Oval Lingotto has been used to host fairs and expeditions.

== Transportation ==
Lingotto is directly served by the Torino Lingotto railway station and is just west of the Turin Metro's Lingotto, Italia '61-Regione Piemonte, and Bengasi stations.
