= Nizza (Turin Metro) =

Turin Metro station

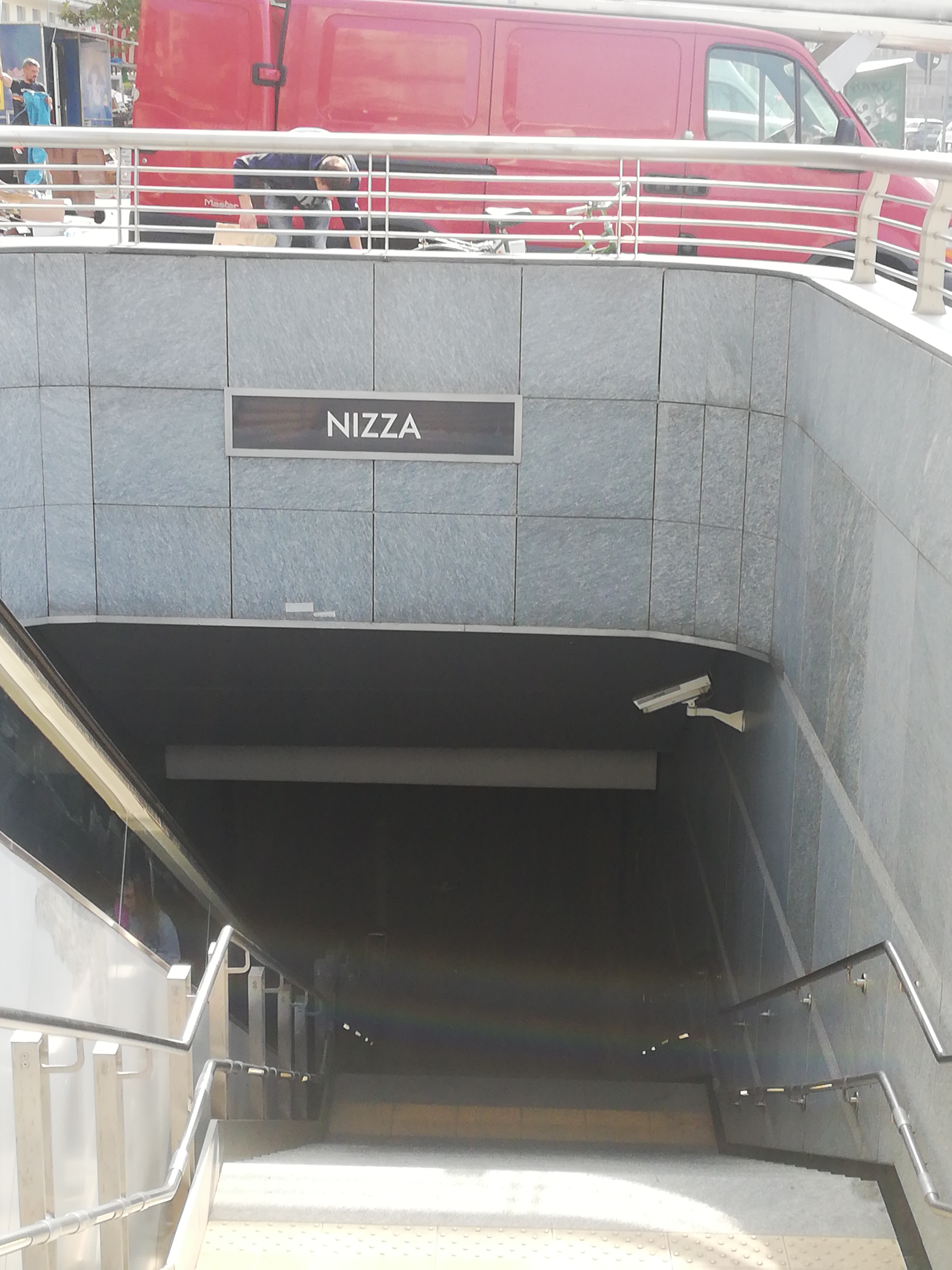
- Stazione di Nizza

General information
- Location: Piazza Nizza, Turin
- Coordinates: 45°03′06″N 7°40′29″E
- Owner: GTT

Construction
- Structure type: Underground
- Accessible: Yes

History
- Opened: 6 March 2011

Services
Preceding station	Turin Metro	Following station
Marconi towards Fermi	Line 1	Dante towards Bengasi
Location

Nizza is a station of the Turin Metro. The station was opened on 6 March 2011 as part of the Line 1 extension from Porta Nuova to Lingotto. It is in the busy, commercial district of central Turin, on the Piazza Nizza. It is located within walking distance to the Torino Exposition Center and Castello del Valentino.

== Services ==
- Ticket vending machines
- Handicap accessibility
- Elevators
- Escalators
- Active CCTV surveillance
