= Porta Susa (Turin Metro) =

Turin Metro station

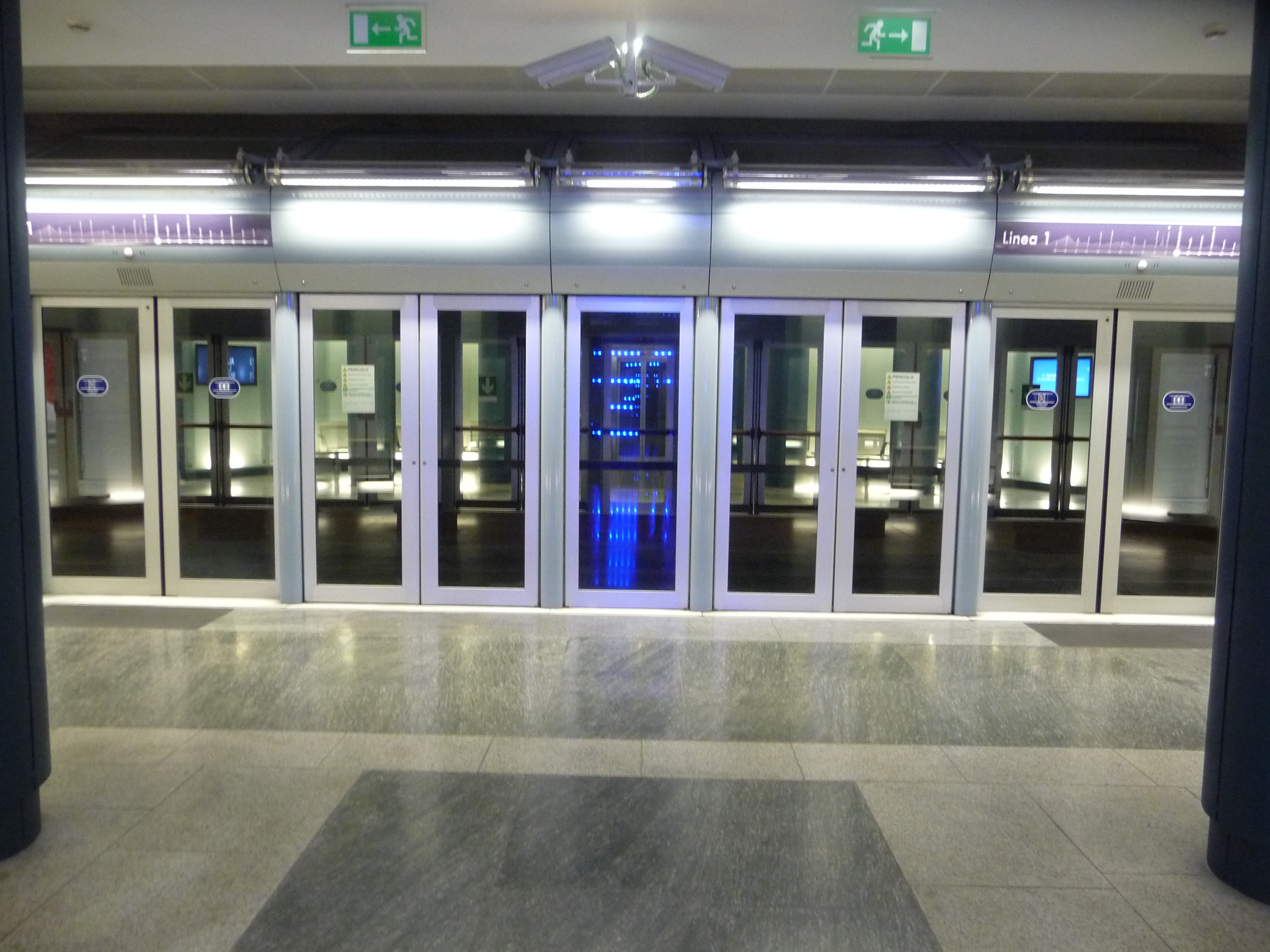

General information
- Location: Corso Bolzano, Turin
- Coordinates: 45°04′12″N 7°39′52″E
- Owner: GTT
- Platforms: 2
- Tracks: 2

Construction
- Structure type: Underground
- Accessible: Yes

History
- Opened: 9 September 2011

Services
Preceding station	Turin Metro	Following station
XVIII Dicembre towards Fermi	Line 1	Vinzaglio towards Bengasi
Location

Porta Susa is a Turin Metro station, located inside Porta Susa railway station.

It was built alongside the Line 1 XVIII Dicembre - Porta Nuova section opened on 5 October 2007, but remained inactive until Porta Susa railway station was inaugurated on 9 September 2011.

== Services ==
- Ticket vending machines
- Handicap accessibility
- Elevators
- Escalators
- Connection with urban and suburban bus lines
- Active CCTV surveillance
