= Vinzaglio (Turin Metro) =

Turin Metro station

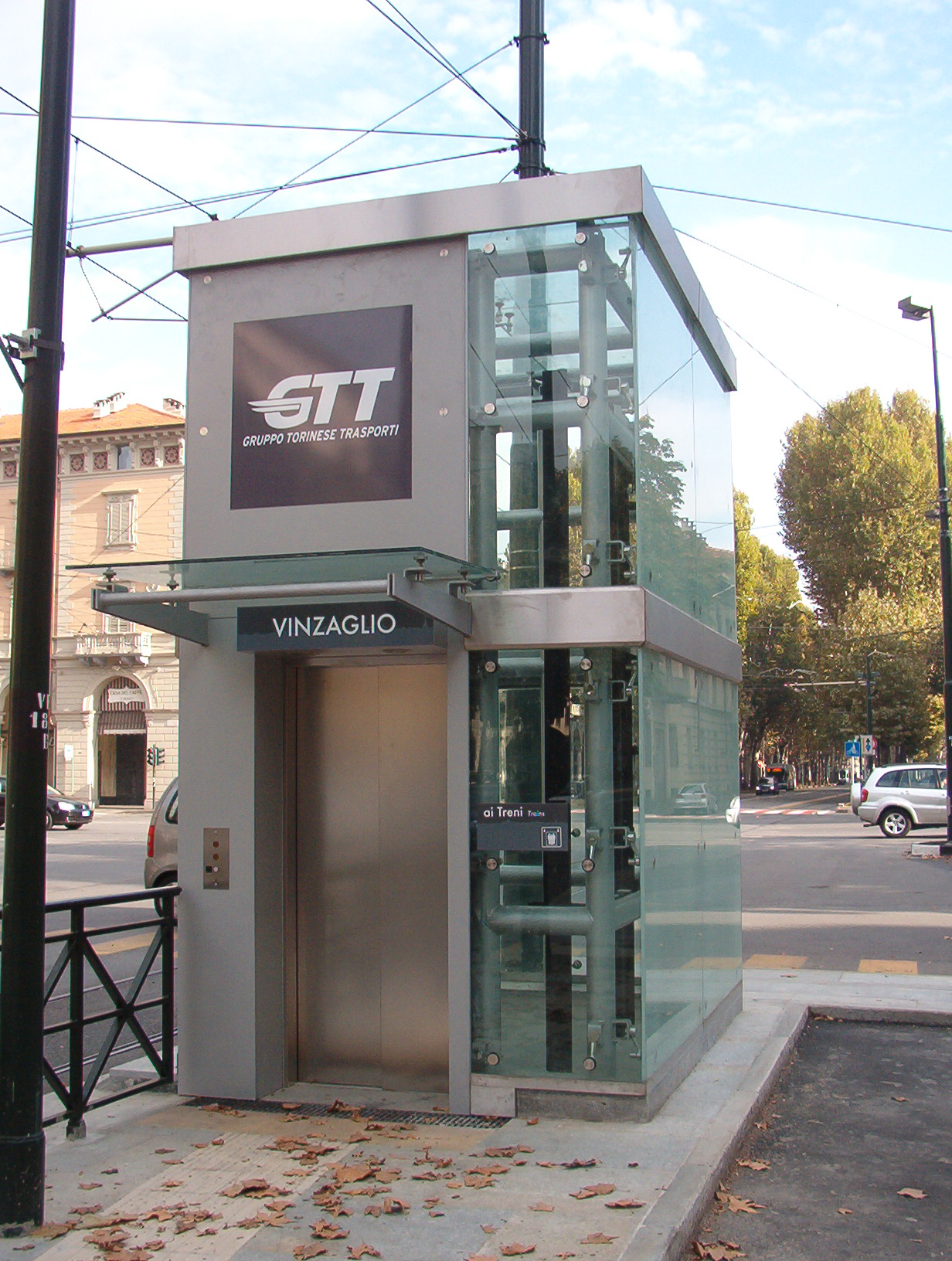

General information
- Location: Corso Vittorio Emanuele II, Turin
- Coordinates: 45°04′02″N 7°39′58″E
- Owner: GTT
- Platforms: 2
- Tracks: 2

Construction
- Structure type: Underground
- Accessible: Yes

History
- Opened: 4 February 2006

Services
Preceding station	Turin Metro	Following station
Porta Susa towards Fermi	Line 1	Re Umberto towards Bengasi
Location

Vinzaglio is a Turin Metro station, located near the intersection between Corso Vinzaglio, Corso Vittorio Emanuele II and Corso Duca degli Abruzzi. It was part of the Line 1 extension from XVIII Dicembre to Porta Nuova opened on 5 October 2007.

The platforms feature decals by Ugo Nespolo, depicting historic moments of the Risorgimento, such as the Battle of Vinzaglio (1859).

== Services ==
- Ticket vending machines
- Handicap accessibility
- Elevators
- Escalators
- Active CCTV surveillance
