= Marconi (Turin Metro) =

Turin Metro station

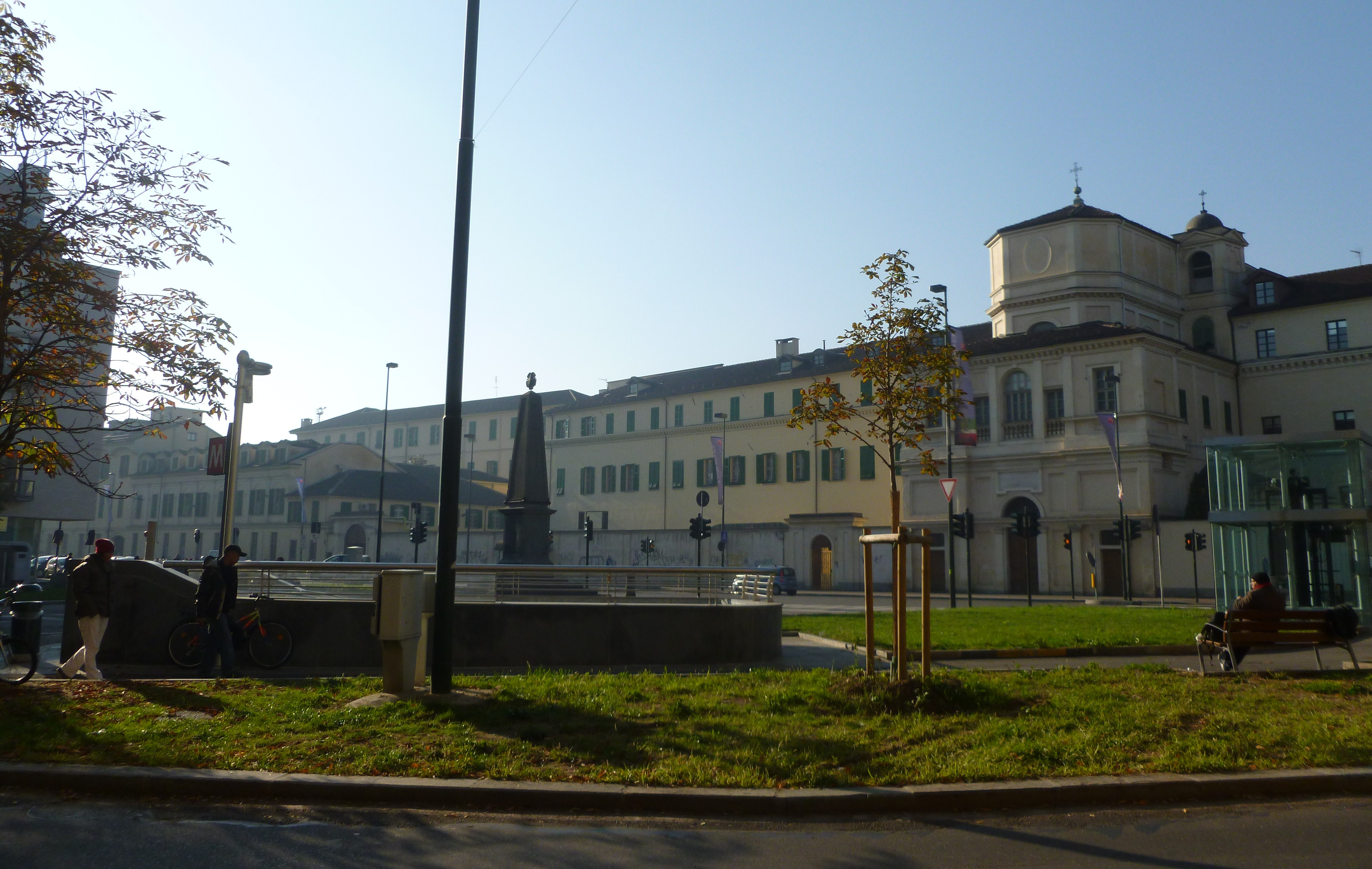

General information
- Location: Via Nizza, Turin
- Coordinates: 45°03′26″N 7°40′37″E
- Owner: GTT

Construction
- Structure type: Underground
- Accessible: Yes

History
- Opened: 6 March 2011

Services
Preceding station	Turin Metro	Following station
Porta Nuova towards Fermi	Line 1	Nizza towards Bengasi
Location

Marconi is a station of the Turin Metro. The station was opened on 6 March 2011 as part of the Line 1 extension from Porta Nuova to Lingotto. It is in the busy, commercial district of central Turin, at the intersection of Via Nizza and Corso Guglielmo Marconi. It is located within walking distance to the Castello del Valentino and Parco del Valentino.

== Services ==
- Ticket vending machines
- Handicap accessibility
- Elevators
- Escalators
- Active CCTV surveillance
