= Greg Goya =

Italian street artist

- Born: 1998 (age 27–28); Turin, Italy
- Occupation: street artist

Greg Goya (born 1998) is an Italian street artist based in Turin.

== Art career ==
Goya's first foray into art was his creation of custom Nike sneakers, which he termed "sneaker art". He then began working in the fashion industry. Goya left after four years, in 2022, which he credited to being tired of the tiring and stressful environment.

Goya's first piece of street art, entitled "Kiss Stop", was in Murazzi in Turin. The piece consisted of a painted heart on the ground, with the label "kiss here". Goya uploaded a video of passerby's reactions to the piece on TikTok in December 2022, where it quickly gained traction and accumulated one million views. The video's success inspired Goya to continue with "fast art" street art installations. By August 2023, he had 95,000 followers on Instagram, which increased by October to 173,000 followers on Instagram and 100,000 followers on TikTok.

Many of his works are installed in Turin, including in Porta Nuova, where he installed a clock which asked viewers "What is the right time?"; the numbers on the clock were replaced with the word "now". At another Turin metro stop, he installed a hopscotch game. In a March 2023 collaboration with the Palace of Venaria, he installed a white bench with a painted question asking viewers who they would like to sit with.

In May 2023, Goya was invited to display a work at the Street Art Museum in Narni, Umbria. His chosen work was a crucifix in a box with a glass front, labeled in English, "In case of desperation, break the glass". The piece received some backlash online, with users accusing Goya of blasphemy. Also that month, Goya presented a piece at TikTok's booth at the Turin International Book Fair.

Goya has largely developed a positive relationship with local police, especially due to his use of washable paint, but has faced backlash on social media for "defacing" streets and landmarks.

=== Style ===
Goya calls his pieces "fast art", referring to how they can quickly provoke emotion in a viewer; he considers his work to be a hybrid between street art and performance art. To achieve this, the pieces are often fairly simple. Goya's works are also frequently interactive, such as offering people space to write an answer to a question, offering an item for people to take, or prompting viewers to perform an action. When he uploads videos of his work to social media, many users will also answer questions posed by the pieces.

Many of Goya's works focus on love and romance. He has said he wants to "mature artistically" before making pieces that deal with social or political criticism.

== Personal life ==
Goya has not revealed his legal name, but has said he is from Turin and that Giorgino was his baptismal name. Goya was previously a law student before dropping out to pursue art as a career.
