= Re Umberto =

Re Umberto may refer to:

- Re Umberto (Turin Metro), a metro station in Turin, Italy
- Re Umberto-class ironclad, a class of three ironclad warships serving in the Italian Navy
- Italian ironclad Re Umberto, lead ship of the Re Umberto-class
- SS Re Umberto, an Italian passenger ship launched in 1892, sunk by a mine in 1915

== See also ==
- Umberto (disambiguation)
