= Re Umberto (Turin Metro) =

Turin Metro station

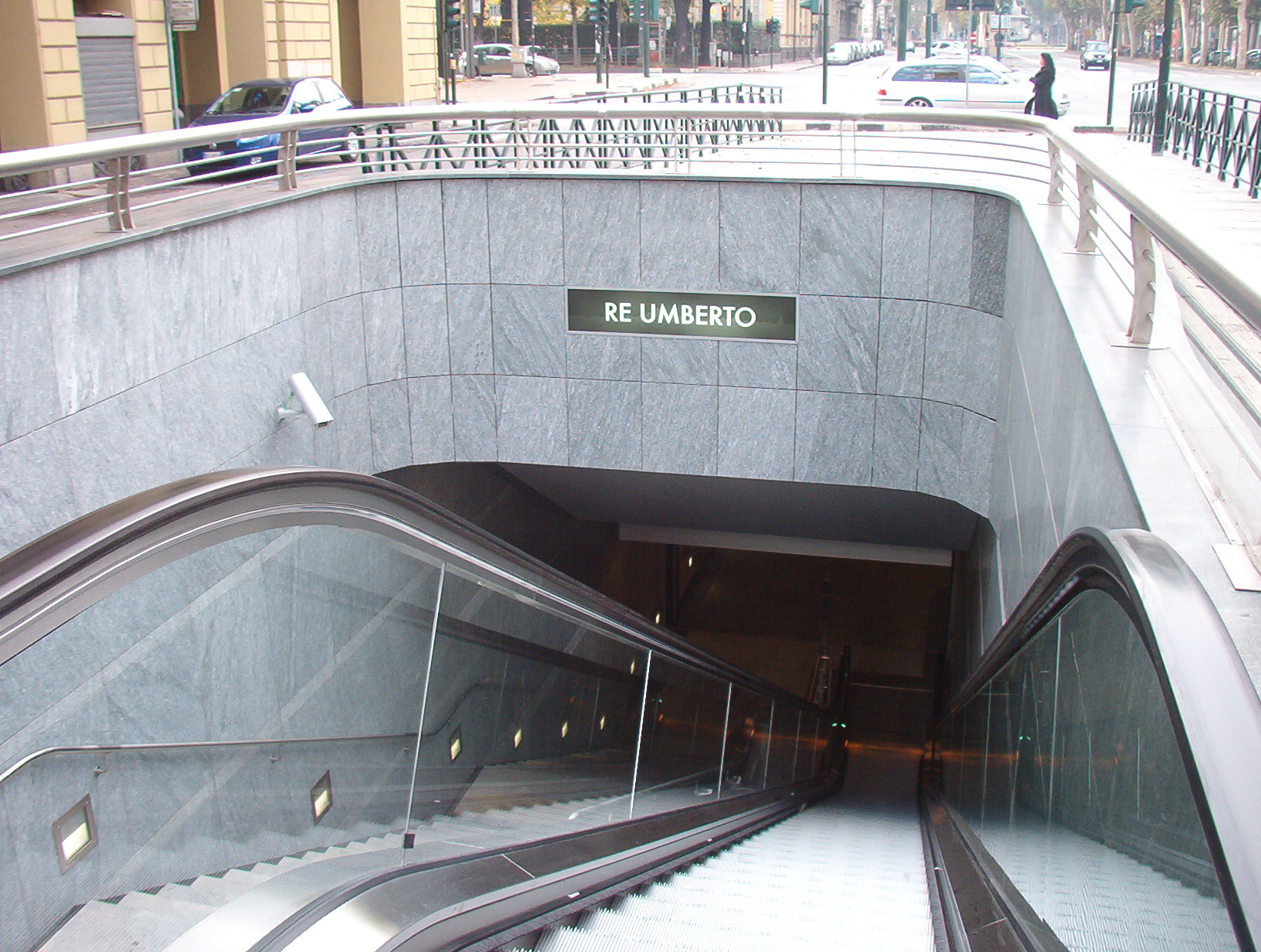

General information
- Location: Corso Vittorio Emanuele II, Turin
- Coordinates: 45°03′52″N 7°40′26″E
- Owner: GTT
- Platforms: 2
- Tracks: 2

Construction
- Structure type: Underground
- Accessible: Yes

History
- Opened: 4 February 2006

Services
Preceding station	Turin Metro	Following station
Vinzaglio towards Fermi	Line 1	Porta Nuova towards Bengasi
Location

Re Umberto is a Turin Metro station, located near the intersection between Corso Vittorio Emanuele II and Corso Re Umberto. It was part of the Line 1 extension from XVIII Dicembre to Porta Nuova opened on 5 October 2007.

The platforms feature decals by Ugo Nespolo, depicting Umberto I of Italy's reign's most significant moments.

== Services ==
- Ticket vending machines
- Handicap accessibility
- Elevators
- Escalators
- Active CCTV surveillance
