= Italia '61-Regione Piemonte (Turin Metro) =

Turin Metro station

Italia '61
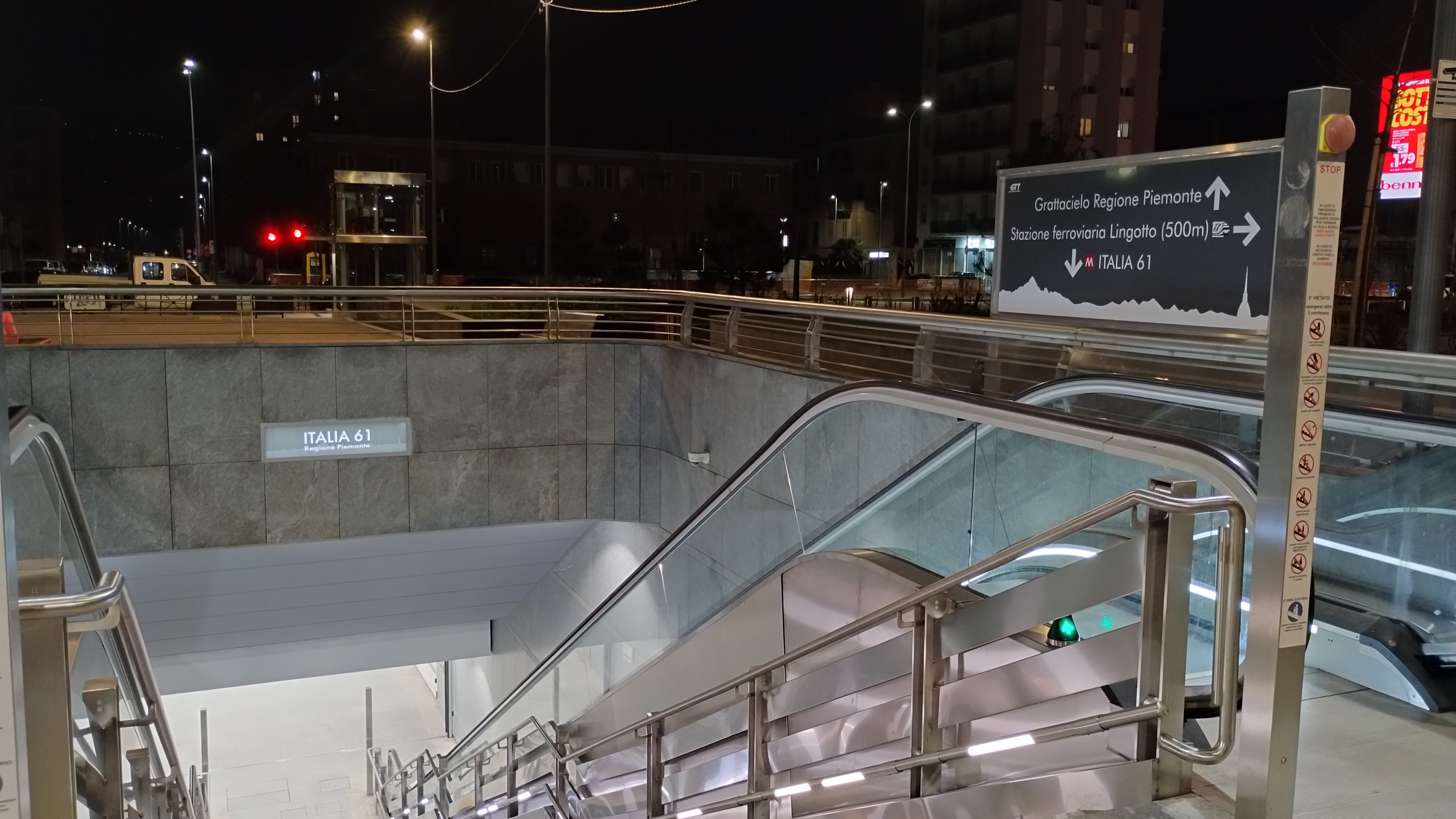

General information
- Location: Via Nizza, Nizza Millefonti, Turin
- Coordinates: 45.024852°N 7.6644°E
- Owner: GTT
- Platforms: 2
- Tracks: 2

Construction
- Structure type: Underground
- Accessible: Yes

History
- Opened: 23 April 2021

Services
| Preceding station | Turin Metro | Following station |
|---|---|---|
| Lingotto towards Fermi | Line 1 | Bengasi Terminus |
Location

Italia '61 is a station of the Turin Metro in Turin, Italy.

The station is located next to the Piedmont Region Headquarters, in the Nizza Millefonti neighbourhood.

== History ==
The mayor of Turin, Chiara Appendino, provided an updated timeline on the project in November 2020, stating that construction on both Italia '61 and Bengasi stations should be completed by the end of January 2021. This would be followed by a phase of track testing, including trains that would travel without passengers. She added that the station would be open to the public in spring 2021. The station opened on 23 April 2021.
