= Palacio Alcorta =

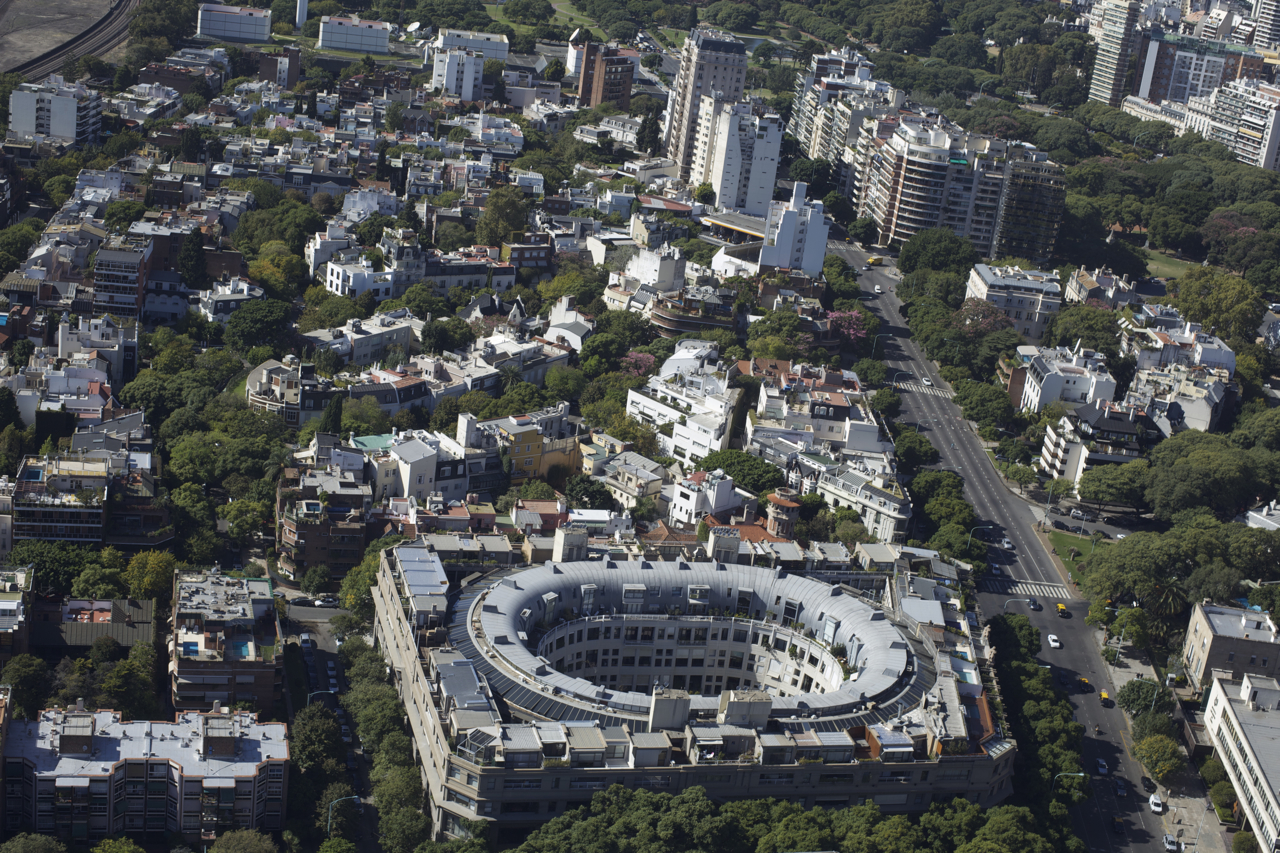

Palacio Alcorta was originally a large test track that was converted into a housing complex in the neighborhood of Palermo Chico, Buenos Aires.

== Summary ==
Mario Palanti, an Italian architect, designed the Palacio Alcorta in 1927. It was formerly known as "Palacio Chrysler" and eventually was promoted as the first Autodromo Palace. The Palacio Alcorta was constructed from 1927–1928 and was eventually remodeled in 1994. It was originally commercial, but is now residential. It has three floors, and it is in the shape of a circle. The inside circle had its own outdoor, vehicle test track, called "Stadium Olimpo". The track is slightly over a mile long. The Palacio Alcorta was used for testing cars and it had a capacity of three thousand people. However, by 1990, the site was no longer used for testing cars and was taken over by a development company who converted it into apartments and offices.
