= Piedmont Region Headquarters =

Skyscraper in Turin, Italy

- Italian: Grattacielo Regione Piemonte
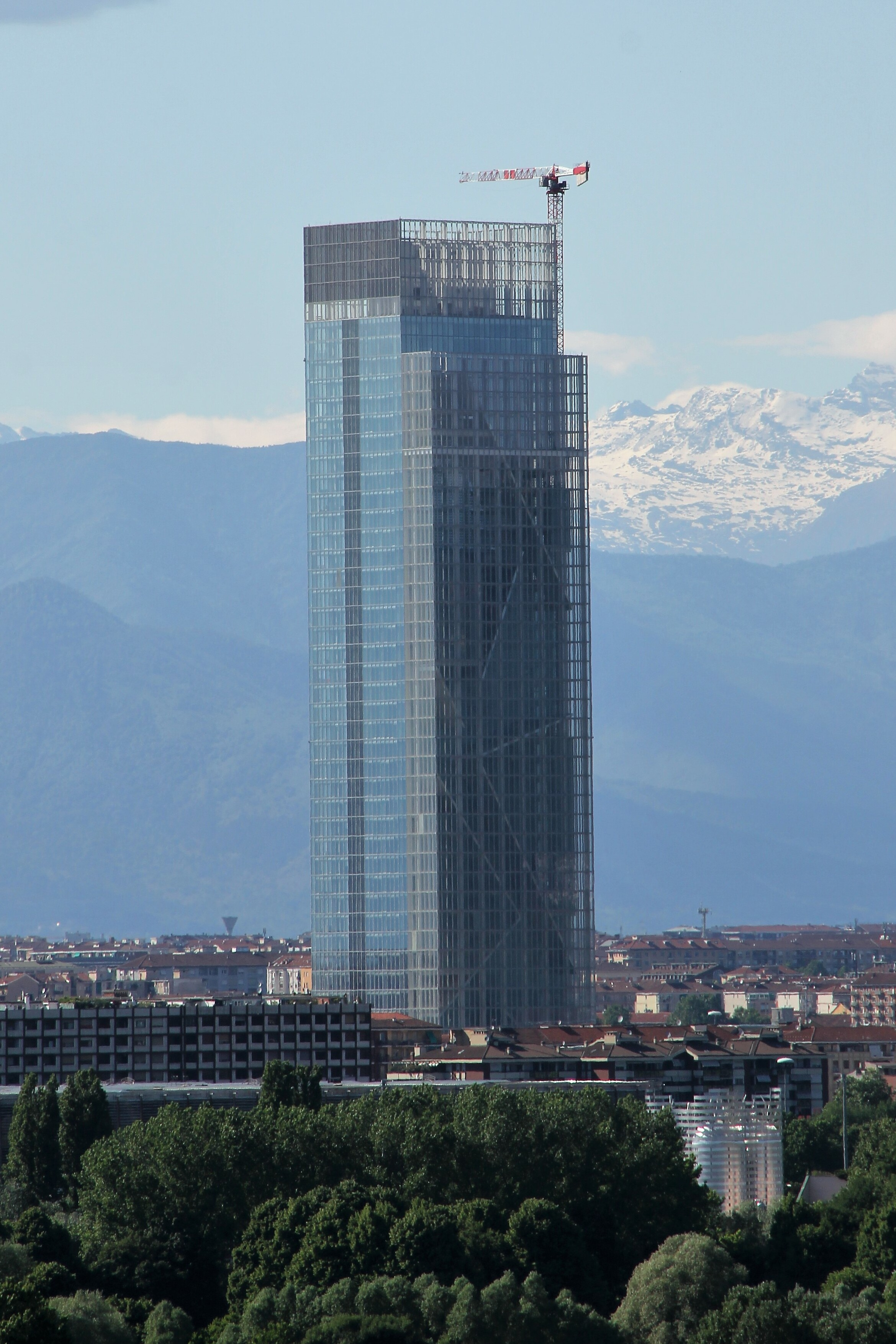
- Interactive map of the Piedmont Region Headquarters area

General information
- Status: Completed
- Type: Office
- Location: district of Nizza Millefonti Turin, Italy
- Coordinates: 45°01′30″N 7°39′42″E
- Opening: 2022
- Owner: Regional Government of Piedmont

Height
- Roof: 205 m (673 ft)

Technical details
- Floor count: 42 + 2 underground

Design and construction
- Architect: Massimiliano Fuksas

The Piedmont Region Headquarters (Grattacielo della Regione Piemonte) is a skyscraper in Turin, Italy, which houses the administrative offices of the Piedmont Region. The building, designed by Massimiliano Fuksas, was topped out in 2015. It sits in an area previously used by former Fiat Avio, not far from the Lingotto mall, in the district of Nizza Millefonti in Turin.

Construction started in Autumn 2011, followed by a series of missteps delaying the completion of the project. In October 2012, after a year of work on the site, an investigation was started on the assignment of the call for tenders for construction. At the end of March 2016, a new investigation was launched, delaying the final stages of construction. The windows installed on the building were faulty, and roughly 300 of the 3,600 already-installed windows needed to be replaced. Work did not resume until the summer of 2017. After years of delays, the headquarters was inaugurated on October 14, 2022, with regional president Alberto Cirio and his staff being the first to move in. Other employees were transferred to the building gradually over the spring of 2023.

== See also ==
- List of tallest buildings in Italy

== Other projects ==
Media related to Grattacielo della Regione Piemonte at Wikimedia Commons
