= CTO Hospital (Turin) =

CTO Hospital Centro Traumatologico Ortopedico
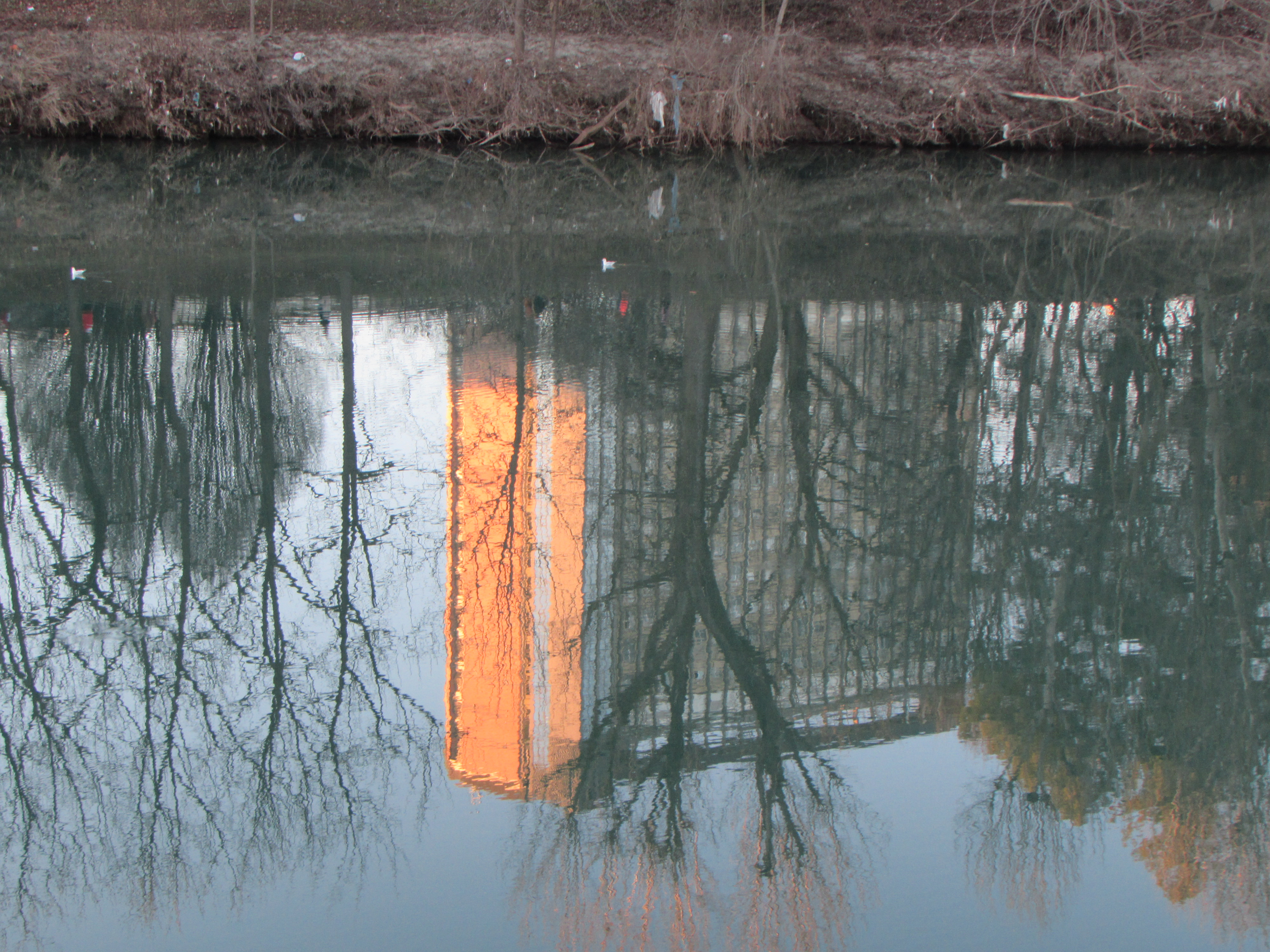

Geography
- Location: Turin, Piedmont, Italy
- Coordinates: 45.033297°N 7.674615°E

Organisation
- Care system: SSN (Servizio Sanitario Nazionale - National Health Service)
- Type: Specialist, Teaching hospital
- Affiliated university: University of Turin

Services
- Emergency department: Yes

History
- Opened: 1961

Links
- Other links: List of hospitals in Italy

CTO Hospital is a major medical center in Turin, Italy. CTO stands for Centro Traumatologico Ortopedico or the Center for Orthopedic Trauma. It is one of the leading orthopedic hospitals in Italy, and services a majority of orthopedic trauma incidents occurring in the Italian Alps. The hospital also serves as a teaching hospital for local medical faculties, particularly the University of Turin.

== History ==
The hospital was founded in 1961.

== 2006 Winter Olympics ==
CTO served as one of the main orthopedic hospitals for athletes, team members, and spectators for the 2006 Winter Olympics.

== Capabilities ==
The hospital maintains a helipad, allowing a fleet of public and private air ambulances to transport patients to and from the hospital. At any given time, the helipad is home to the Agusta-Bell AB 412 or other air ambulance rotary craft.

=== Notable treatments ===
CTO continues to specialize in the use of the Ilizarov apparatus for complex limb fractures. It is one of the leading hospitals in the world for the treatment of complex leg tibial-fibular fractures and other complex fractures, particularly those found in skiing accidents and mountaineering accidents.

== See also ==
- Ilizarov apparatus
- Torino Lingotto railway station
- Torino Lingotto metro station
