= Lingotto =

Building complex and former factory in Turin, Italy

Coordinates: 45°1′57″N 7°39′52″E

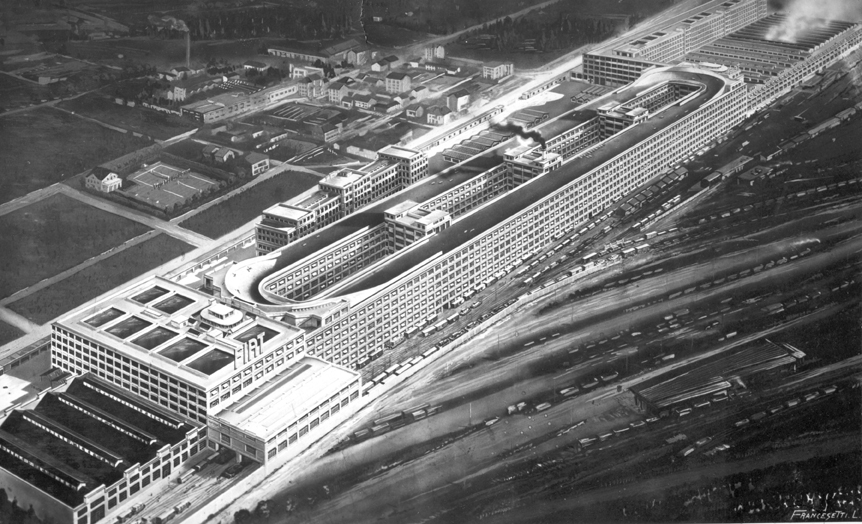
Historical view of Lingotto building with the test track on the roof (1928)

Lingotto is a building complex on Via Nizza in Turin, Italy. It once housed a car factory built by Italian automotive company Fiat and today houses the administrative headquarters of the manufacturer and a multipurpose centre projected by architect Renzo Piano.

== History ==
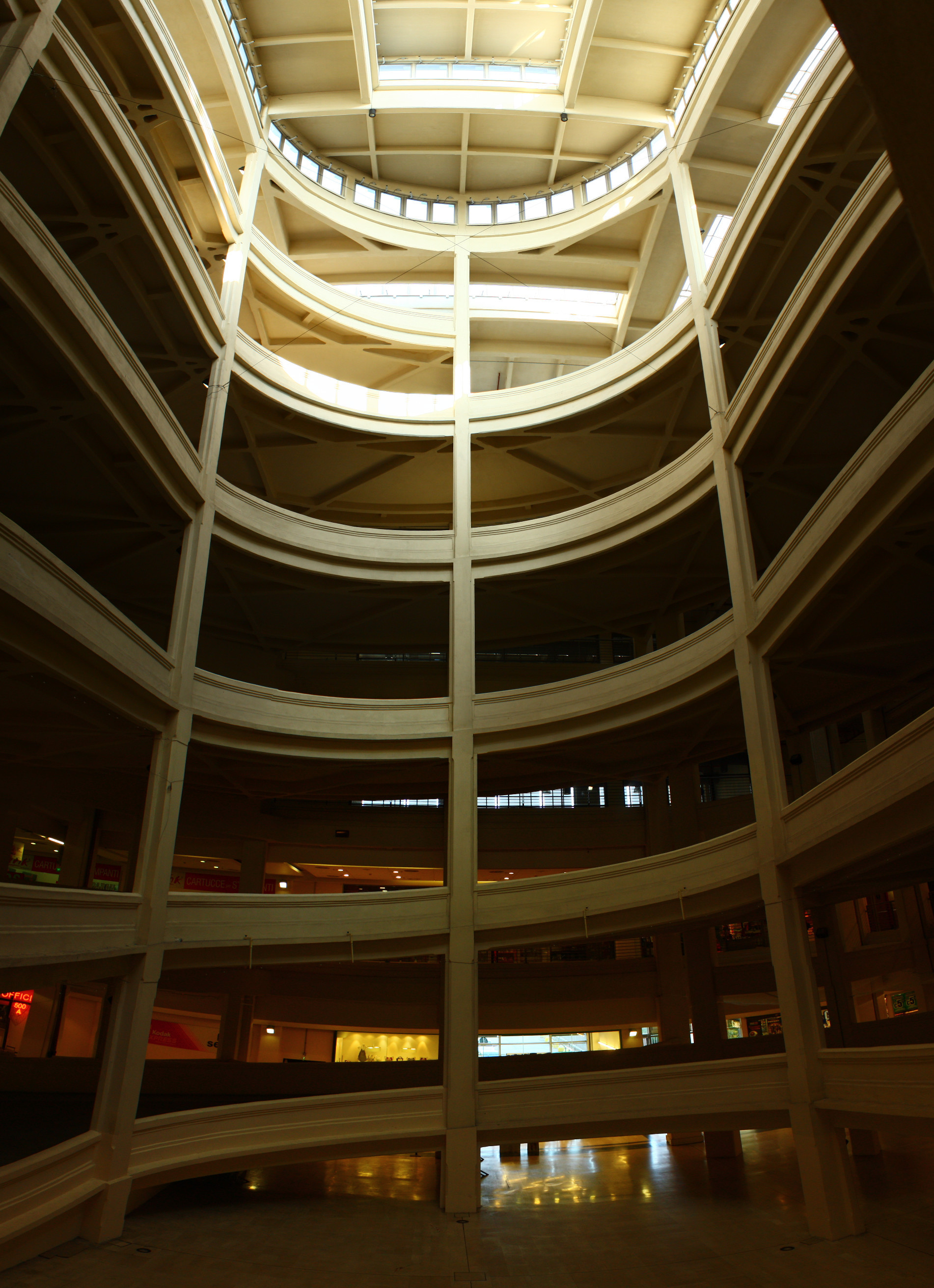
Helix access ramp to move cars up to a higher level of the former Fiat factory (2013).

In 1916, construction started on the complex, and it was completed in 1923. The design by the young architect Giacomo Matté-Trucco was unusual in that it had five floors, with raw materials going in at the ground floor, and cars built on a line that went up through the building. Finished cars emerged at rooftop level to go onto a 1,500-metre (1.5 km; 4,900 ft; 0.93 mi) long test track, with spiral concrete access ramps at each end.

The construction was carried out by the company of G A Porcheddu. It was the largest car factory in the world at that time. For its time, the Lingotto building was avant garde, influential, and impressive—Le Corbusier called it "one of the most impressive sights in industry", and "a guideline for town planning". In its lifetime, the factory manufactured 80 different car models, notably the 1936 Fiat Topolino.

By the late 1970s, the factory had become obsolete — having been superseded by the larger and more advanced Fiat Mirafiori factory — and a decision was made to finally close it in 1982. The closure of the plant led to much public debate about its future, and how to recover from industrial decline in general. An architectural competition was held, which was eventually awarded to Renzo Piano, who envisioned an exciting public space for the city. The old factory was restored into a modern complex, with concert halls, theatre, a convention centre, shopping arcades, and a hotel. The eastern portion of the building is the headquarters of the Automotive Engineering faculty of the Polytechnic University of Turin. The work was completed in 1989. The track was retained, and can still be visited today on the top floor of the shopping mall and hotel. The top floor contains an art gallery that houses the art collection of Gianni Agnelli (1921 – 2003).

Similar rooftop tests tracks exist, including at Impéria in Nessonvaux in Belgium and Palacio Chrysler in Buenos Aires, Argentina. From 1928 to 1958, Impéria had a track over 1,000 metres (1.0 km; 3,300 ft; 0.62 mi) long that was built partially on top of the factory.

== In popular culture ==
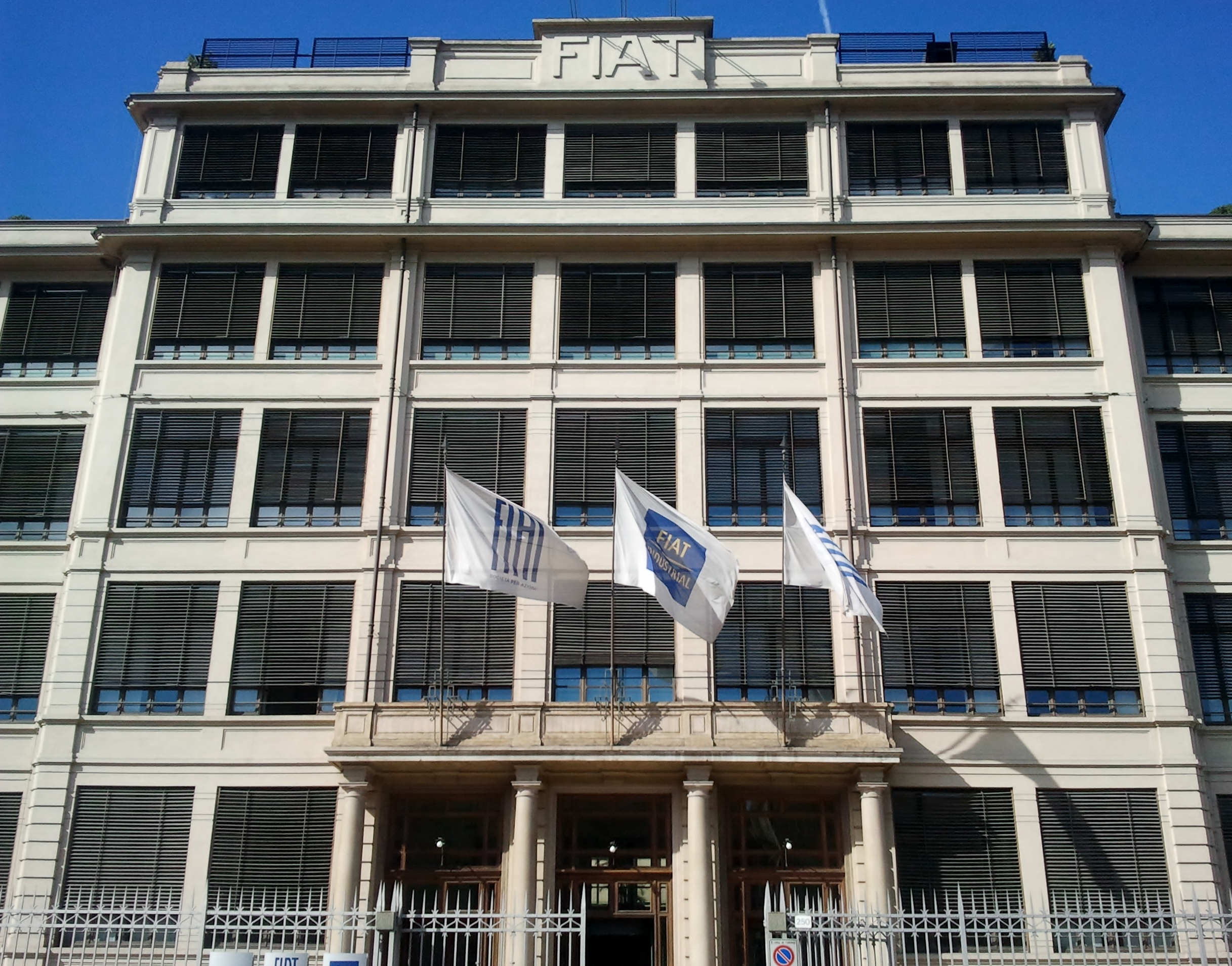
The Palazzina building (2011).

The Lingotto building is featured extensively in the Alberto Lattuada film Mafioso (1962).

The original Lingotto rooftop test track features briefly in the getaway sequence in the film The Italian Job (1969).

The building was featured in an episode of Season 20 of The Amazing Race.

The building and test track were featured on the first episode of James May's Cars of the People.
