= Lingotto (Turin Metro) =

Turin Metro station

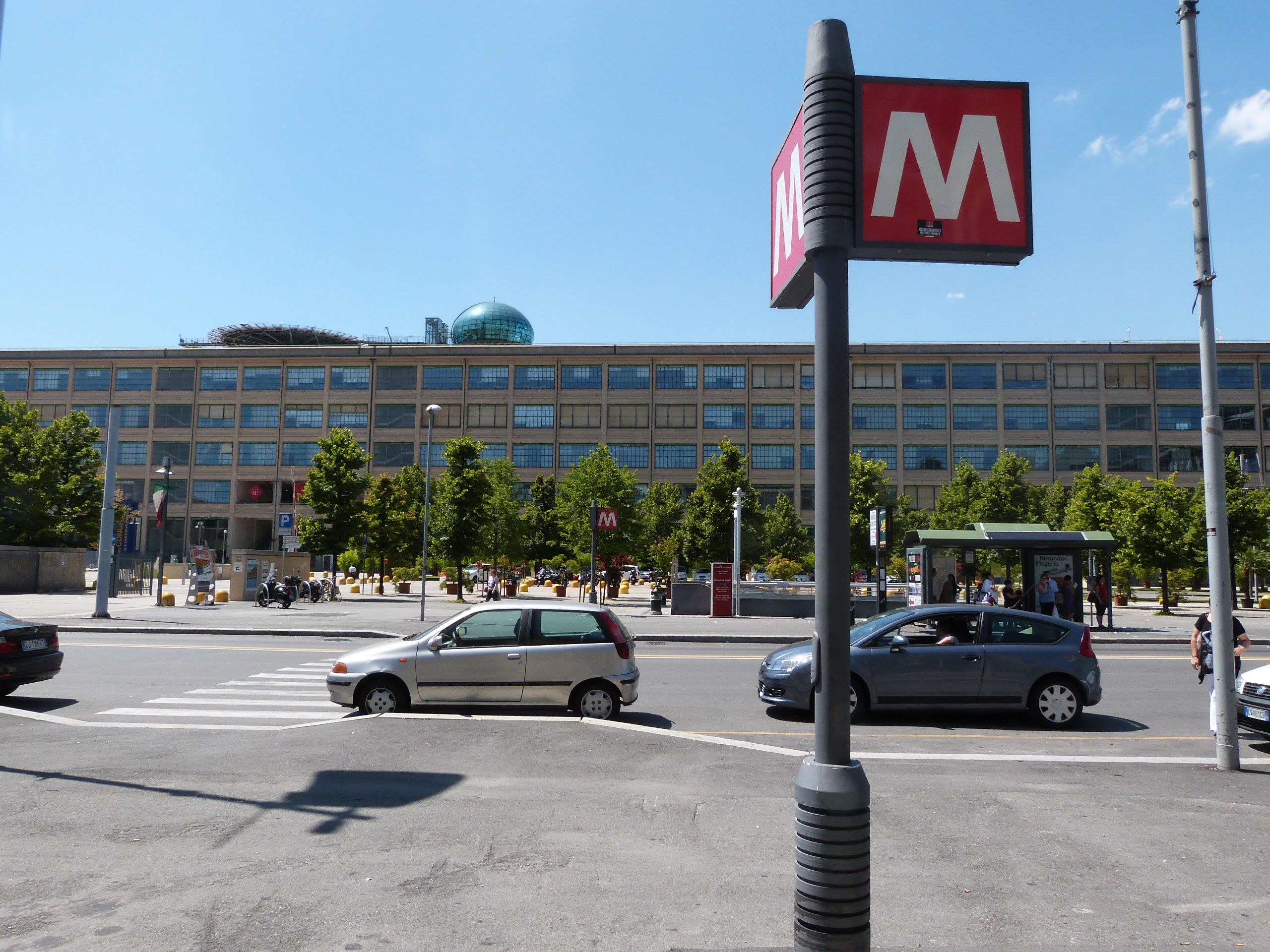

General information
- Location: Via Nizza, Turin
- Coordinates: 45°01′55″N 7°40′02″E
- Owner: GTT

Construction
- Structure type: Underground
- Accessible: Yes

History
- Opened: 6 March 2011

Services
Preceding station	Turin Metro	Following station
Spezia towards Fermi	Line 1	Italia '61-Regione Piemonte towards Bengasi
Location

Lingotto is a station of the Turin Metro. The station was opened on 6 March 2011 as part of the Line 1 extension from Porta Nuova to Lingotto. Lingotto metro station is located in the busy, commercial district of southcentral Turin, along Via Nizza. It is located within walking distance to the Torino Lingotto, Eataly, Torino Palavela and the Oval Lingotto.

== Services ==
- Ticket vending machines
- Handicap accessibility
- Elevators
- Escalators
- Active CCTV surveillance
