= Porta Nuova (Turin Metro) =

Turin Metro station

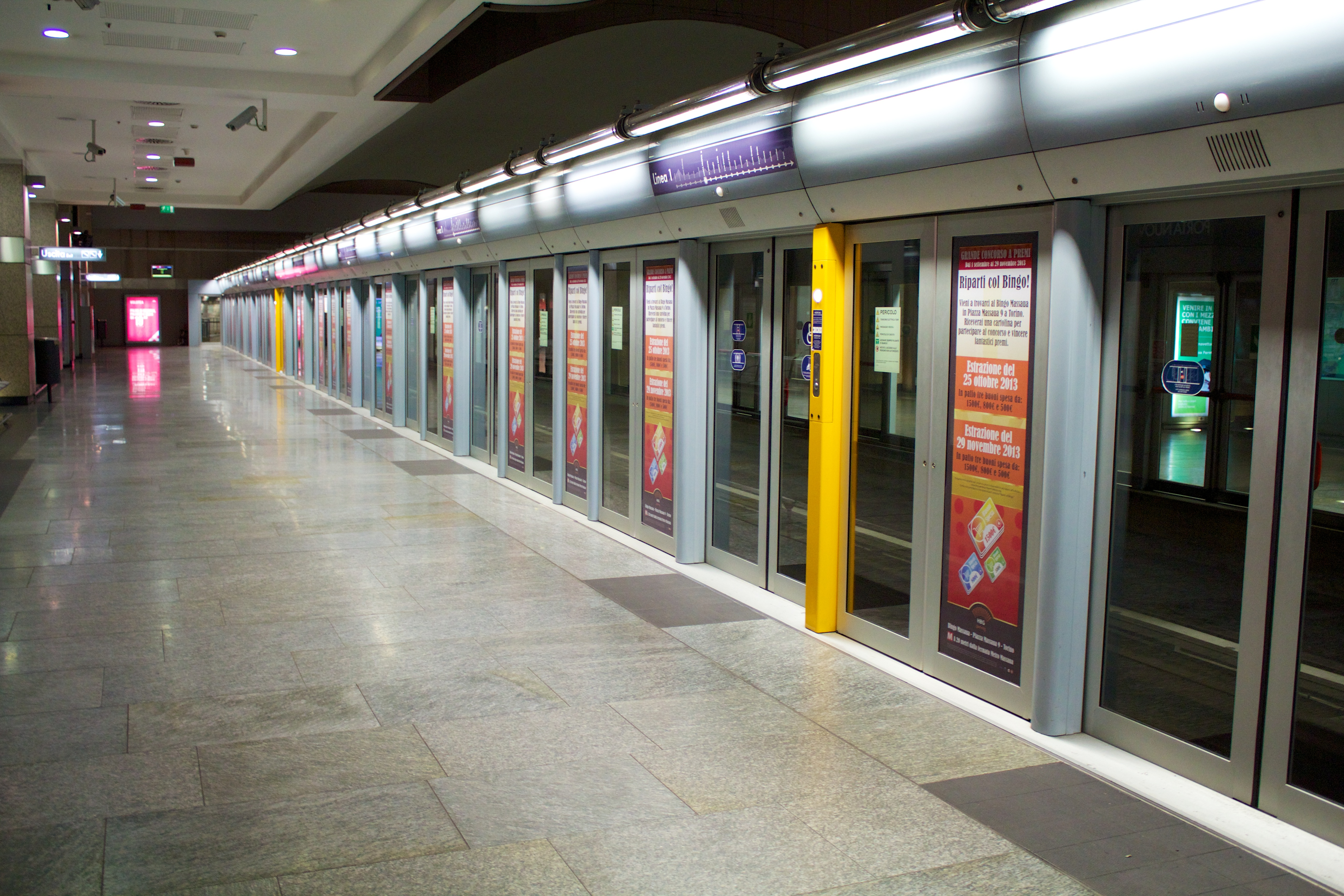

General information
- Location: Piazza Carlo Felice, Turin
- Coordinates: 45°03′45″N 7°40′44″E
- Owner: GTT
- Platforms: 2
- Tracks: 2

Construction
- Structure type: Underground
- Accessible: Yes

History
- Opened: 5 October 2007

Services
Preceding station	Turin Metro	Following station
Re Umberto towards Fermi	Line 1	Marconi towards Bengasi
Location

Porta Nuova is a Turin Metro station, located inside Porta Nuova railway station, near Piazza Carlo Felice. It was part of the Line 1 extension from XVIII Dicembre to Porta Nuova opened on 5 October 2007. On 6 March 2011 the line was extended to Lingotto.

== Services ==
- Connections with urban and suburban bus lines
- Ticket vending machines
- Handicap accessibility
- Elevators
- Escalators
- Active CCTV surveillance
