= Turin Metro =

Rapid transit system of Turin, Italy

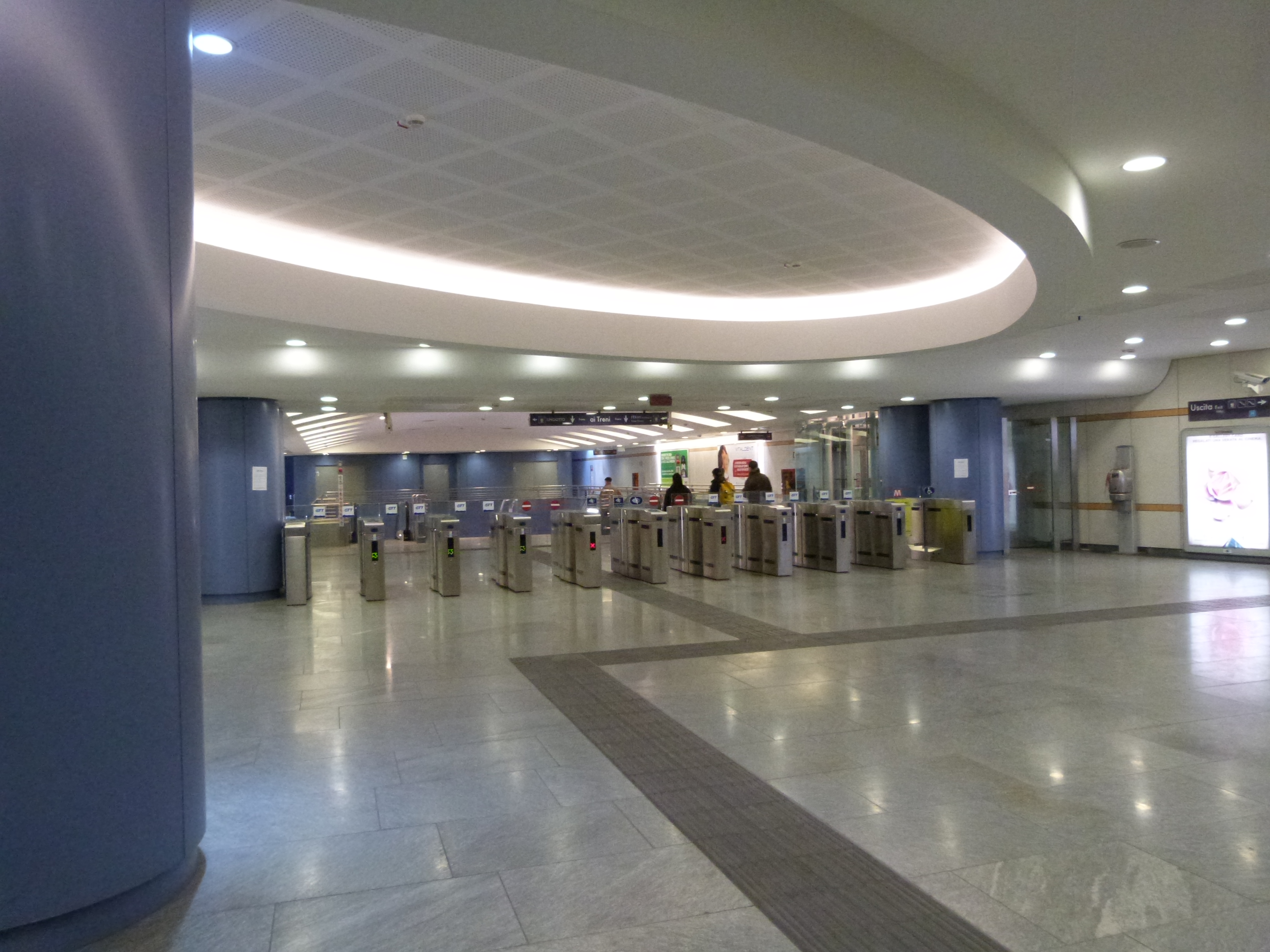

Overview
- Native name: Metropolitana di Torino
- Locale: Turin, Piedmont, Italy
- Transit type: Rapid transit
- Number of lines: 1
- Number of stations: 23
- Daily ridership: 155,000
- Annual ridership: 42.5 million (2018)

Operation
- Began operation: February 4, 2006; 20 years ago
- Operator: Gruppo Torinese Trasporti (GTT)
- Number of vehicles: 58 (2009) (Note: Before the extension to Lingotto.)
- Train length: 52 m (171 ft)
- Headway: 2 minutes

Technical
- System length: 15.1 km (9 mi 31 ch)
- Track gauge: 1,620 mm (5 ft 4 in)
- Electrification: 750 V DC third rail
- Average speed: 33 km/h (21 mph)
- Top speed: 80 km/h (50 mph)
System map

The Turin Metro (Italian: Metropolitana di Torino) is the modern driverless VAL rapid transit system serving Turin. It is operated by Gruppo Torinese Trasporti (GTT), a public company controlled by the municipality of Turin. The system comprises one 15.1-kilometre (9 mi 31 ch) line with 23 stations connecting Fermi station in Collegno with Piazza Bengasi in Turin, near the border with the municipality of Moncalieri.

== History ==
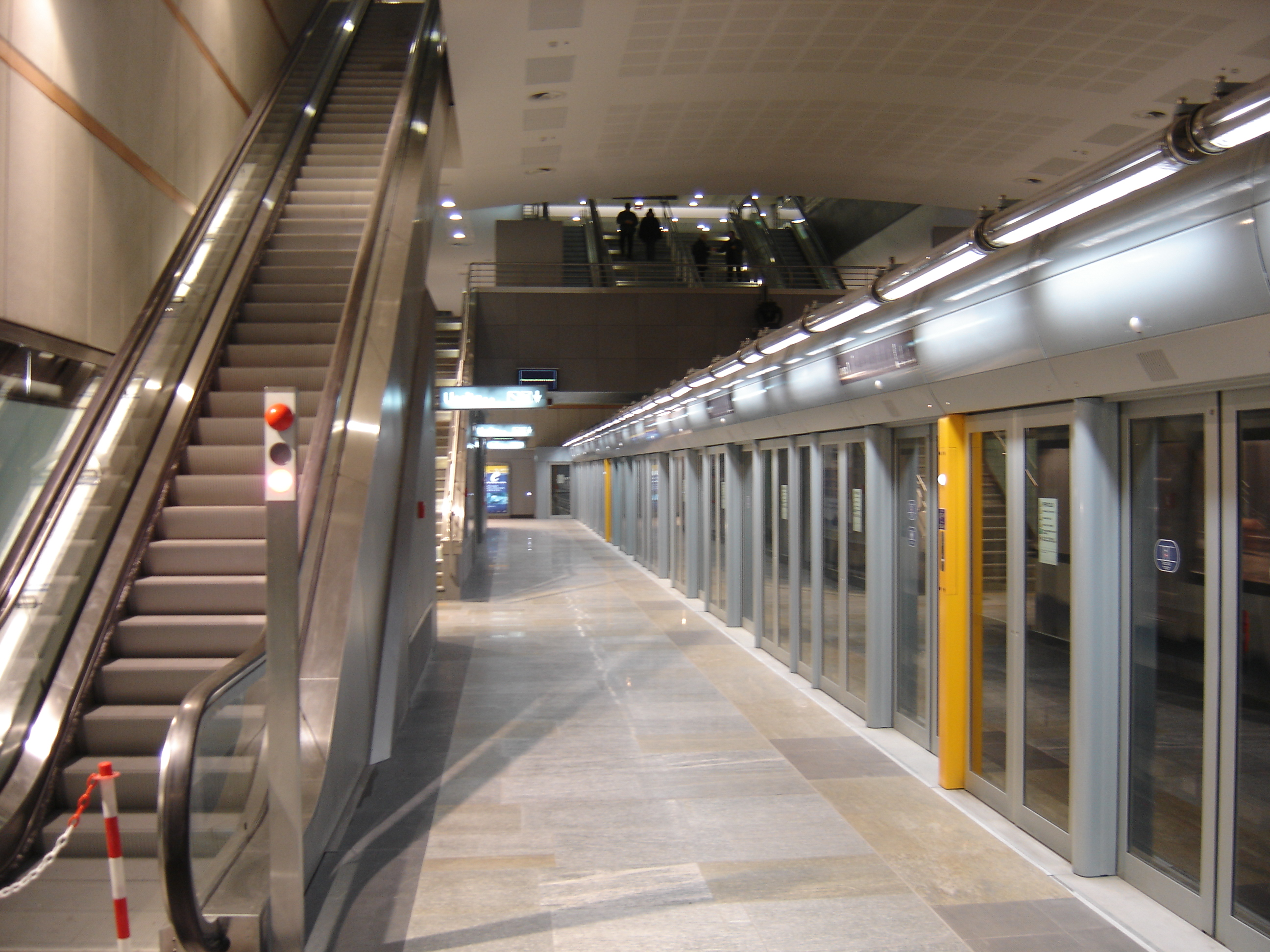
Station Fermi during the 2006 Winter Olympics.

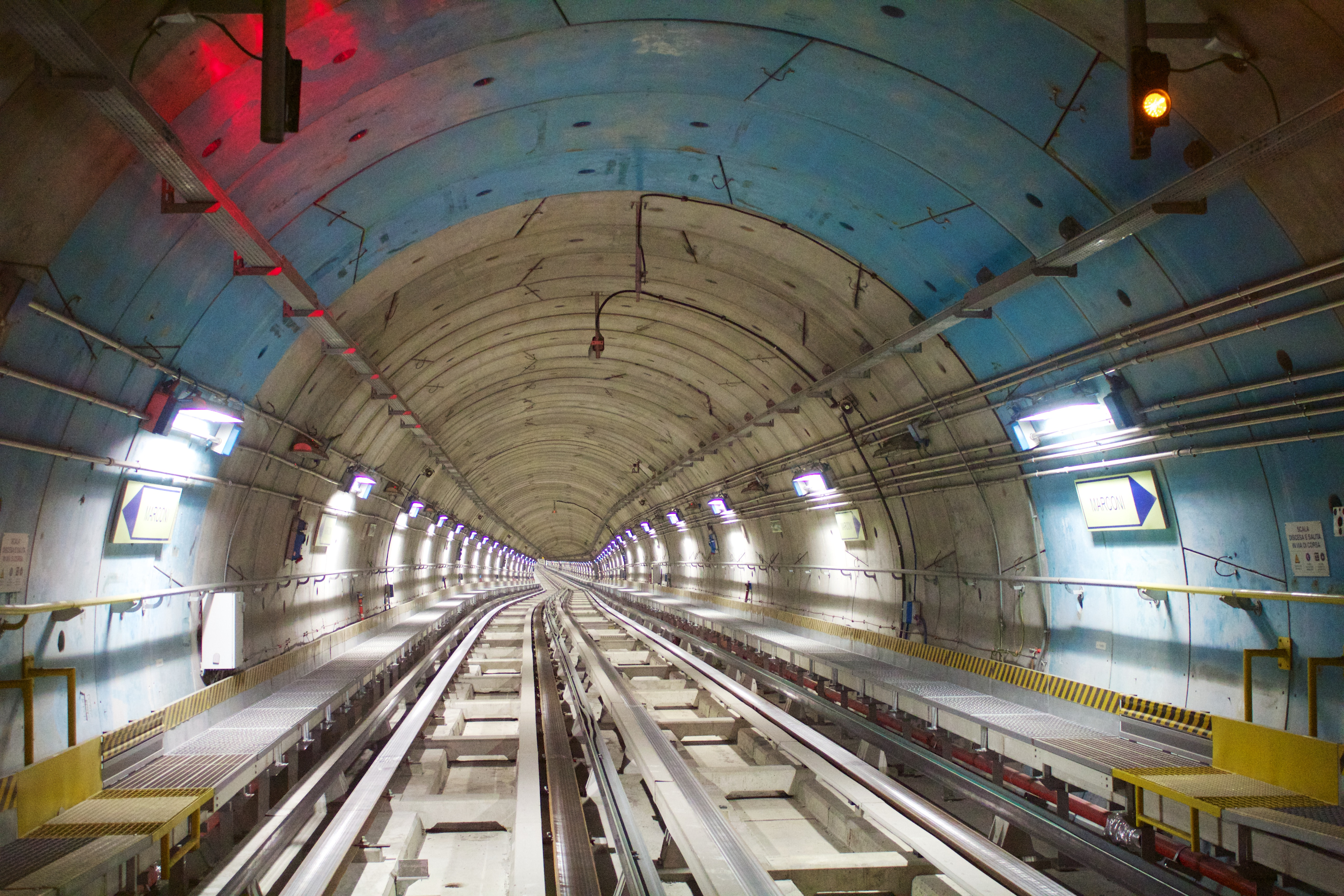
Turin Metro tracks

The history of metro in Turin begins in 1930s, when the first project of an underground railway was put forward. However, only a part of the first tunnel was built, and the actual project was put aside. Nowadays, the tunnel is part of an underground parking system.

A new company committed to the development of a metro system in Turin was founded in 1960s. Several projects and feasibility studies were made for a 7 km (4.3 mi) underground line under the city centre and then for a line connecting FIAT factories to surrounding neighborhoods, but eventually all the proposals were rejected.

In the mid-1980s, a new proposal for a system of 5 fast tram lines at-grade was approved. However, only the planned line 3 was built following the original project, while the others eventually were built either as regular tram lines, with no dedicated lane, or as bus lines.

A new project was approved in 1995 for a line running from Campo Volo on the west border of the city to Porta Nuova, the main railway station in Turin. The project was put in hold due to lack of funds.

The project for the underground line was resumed in April 1999 with a longer route to Lingott based on the VAL system. Works on the line began on 19 December 2000, part of the works for the Turin 2006 Winter Olympics. The first section from Fermi to XVIII Dicembre was opened on 4 February 2006, while the second section on the south to Porta Nuova opened on 5 October 2007. Porta Susa station opened later on 9 September 2011. The last part of the line on the south to Lingotto was inaugurated on 6 March 2011.

=== Lingotto – Bengasi southern extension ===
Two additional stations, reaching the Southern boundary of the city, were built between 2012 and 2021. These stations are Italia '61, serving the new Piedmont Region Headquarters, and Bengasi, named for the piazza under which it is located. They were opened on 23 April 2021.

=== Timeline ===
Section	Date	Route
1	4 February 2006	Fermi – XVIII Dicembre
2	5 October 2007	XVIII Dicembre – Porta Nuova
3	6 March 2011	Porta Nuova – Lingotto
4	23 April 2021	Lingotto – Bengasi

== Network ==
Line	Terminals	Opened	Newest extension	Length	Stations
Line 1	Fermi – Bengasi	4 February 2006	23 April 2021	15.1 km (9.4 mi)	23

== Service ==
=== Ticketing ===
From May 2018, the single journey ticket costs €1.70 and it includes the urban line and the suburban line for 100 minutes. Moreover, any form of urban transport season ticket is valid also for the metro system.

=== Opening hours ===
Turin metro starts operating at 5:30 from Monday to Saturday and at 7:00 on Sundays. It closes at 22:00 on Mondays, at 00:30 from Tuesday to Thursday, at 1:30 on Friday and Saturday and at 1:00 on Sundays.

== Plans ==
=== Line 1 ===
==== Collegno – Cascine Vica westward extension ====
A further Western extension is planned to reach the boundaries of Collegno and the city of Rivoli. In December 2017, the city approved the first stage of the project, valued at €123.7 million, to construct two already named stations: Certosa, which will interchange with the central railway station of the city of Collegno, and Collegno Centro, serving its central market area. An additional two stations, including one in the Leumann Village neighbourhood and another in the Cascine Vica district of Rivoli, were allocated €148 million. The Ministry of Infrastructure and Transport expects the extension to Cascine Vica to be completed by Summer 2023.

=== Line 2 ===
On 30 August 2017, a contract to create the preliminary design for a second line was awarded to Systra, a French conglomerate. The line will connect South-Western suburbs of the city (Orbassano and Beinasco) with the northern district of Barriera di Milano. The first 26 stations had already been defined, starting from Mirafiori Sud district to Barriera di Milano, crossing the Line 1 at Porta Nuova station and serving key points as Politecnico di Torino University and Piazza Castello, one of the major central squares of the city.

Part of the Southern track will be elevated to reduce building costs (starting from Piazza Cattaneo to Cimitero Sud). On Northern side, from Vanchiglia to Rebaudengo, it will follow an old (currently abandoned) railway track, which was used to connect the old and abandoned scalo Vanchiglia freight terminal to the main Turin railway.

Preliminary analysis conducted by Systra in the Spring of 2018 resulted in some changes to this original alignment. The following June, public consultations were announced and the new alignment, with the list of 23 planned stations was published on the city's website. In December 2018, the preliminary project was submitted to the Ministry of Transportation for funding approval, with an objective to start the bidding process by 2021. In 2019, the Italian government committed €828 million in funding for Line 2's total projected €3 billion cost, with construction originally due to begin in 2021 for a 2028 opening.

In 2026, a new design was announced with 31 stations spanning 28 km, with Hitachi Rail selected to deliver the rolling stock and signaling. The line is now planned to open starting 2033.

List of planned stations of the Turin Metro Line 2
- Anselmetti
- Mirafiori
- Cattaneo
- Omero
- Pitagora
- Parco Rignon
- Santa Rita
- Stadio Olimpico – Piazza d'Armi
- Zappata
- Caboto
- Politecnico
- Pastrengo
- Porta Nuova – M1
- Carlo Alberto
- Mole – Giardini Reali
- Verona
- Novara
- Bologna
- Cimarosa – Tabacchi
- Corelli
- Giovanni Bosco
- Giulio Cesare
- Rebaudengo

In the future, a 4 station extension could cover suburbs of Beinasco and Orbassano to reach terminus Pasta di Rivalta in the city of Rivalta di Torino.

=== Possibility for Line 3 ===
The former mayor of Turin, Chiara Appendino, publicly supported the idea of a third line for the city's Metro system. Campaign literature, published on the then candidate's website during the Turin municipal election, 2016, show Line 3 using tracks that formally served the Ferrovia Torino-Ceres railway. Potential stations would serve the community of Venaria Reale, the Juventus Stadium and Turin International Airport. Since the election, Deputy Mayor and Chief of Urban Planning Guido Montanari has expressed interest in readapting the Torino-Ceres line to be part of the city's Metro network. After which the city council decided to keep the railway line Torino-Ceres with a new tunnel and a new station, called Torino Grosseto.

In 2019, the mayor of Venaria, together with the first citizens of Pianezza, Druento, Cafasse, Alpignano, Fiano and Val della Torre, presented a new proposal of metro to the mayor of Turin Chiara Appendino. The route will include the west part of the city: Torino Dora railway station, Juventus Stadium, Amedeo di Savoia Hospital, Maria Vittoria Hospital, San Donato district, Campidoglio, Parella, Cenisia, San Paolo, Mirafiori Nord and Caio Maio Square. The metro would provide for interchange in three stations: Rivoli, Pitagora, Bengasi.

== Rolling stock ==
- 58 Siemens VAL 208
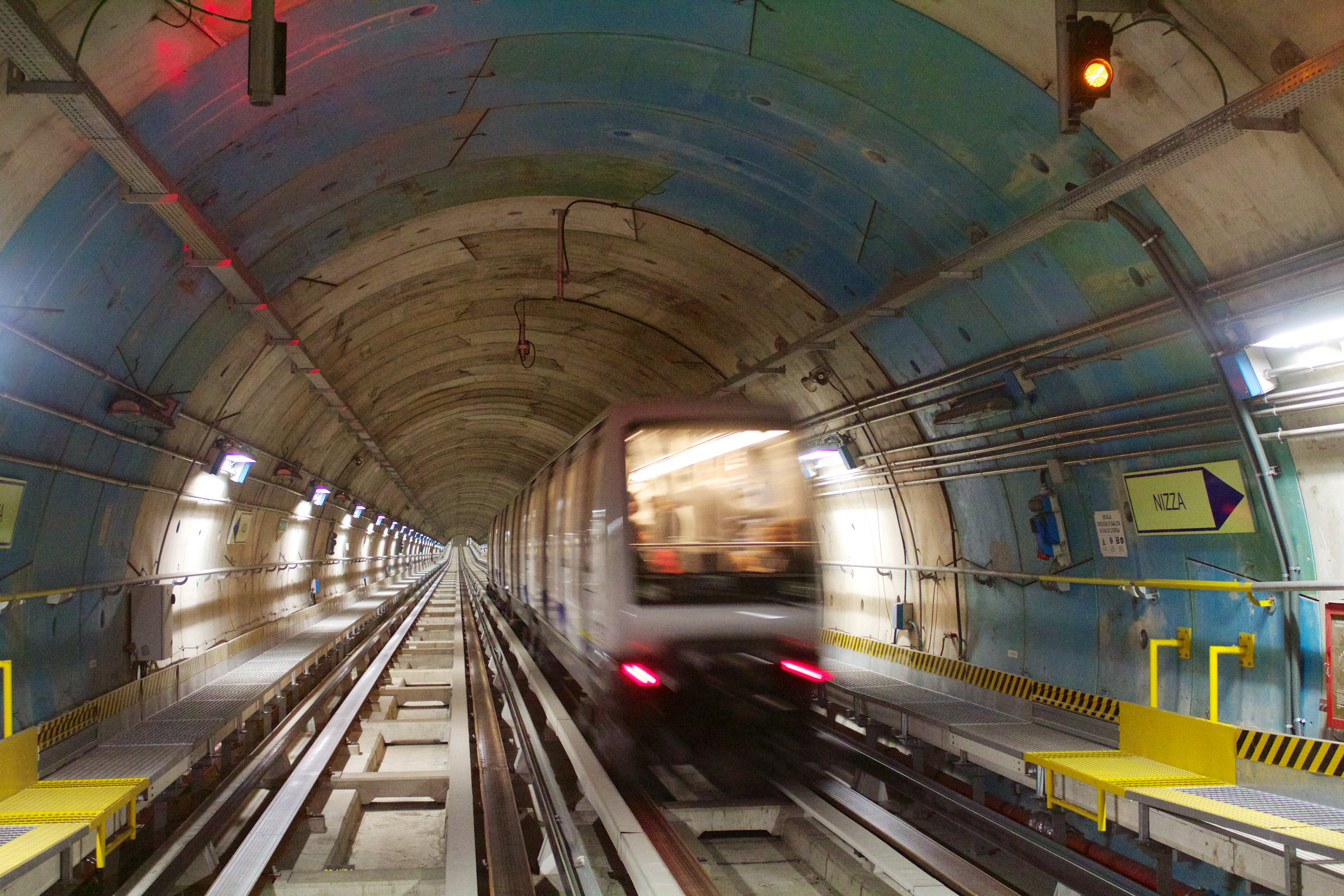
VAL 208 trainset used on the Turin Metro

== See also ==
- Trams in Turin
- Turin metropolitan railway service
- List of suburban and commuter rail systems
- Lists of rapid transit systems
