= Bengasi (Turin Metro) =

Turin Metro station

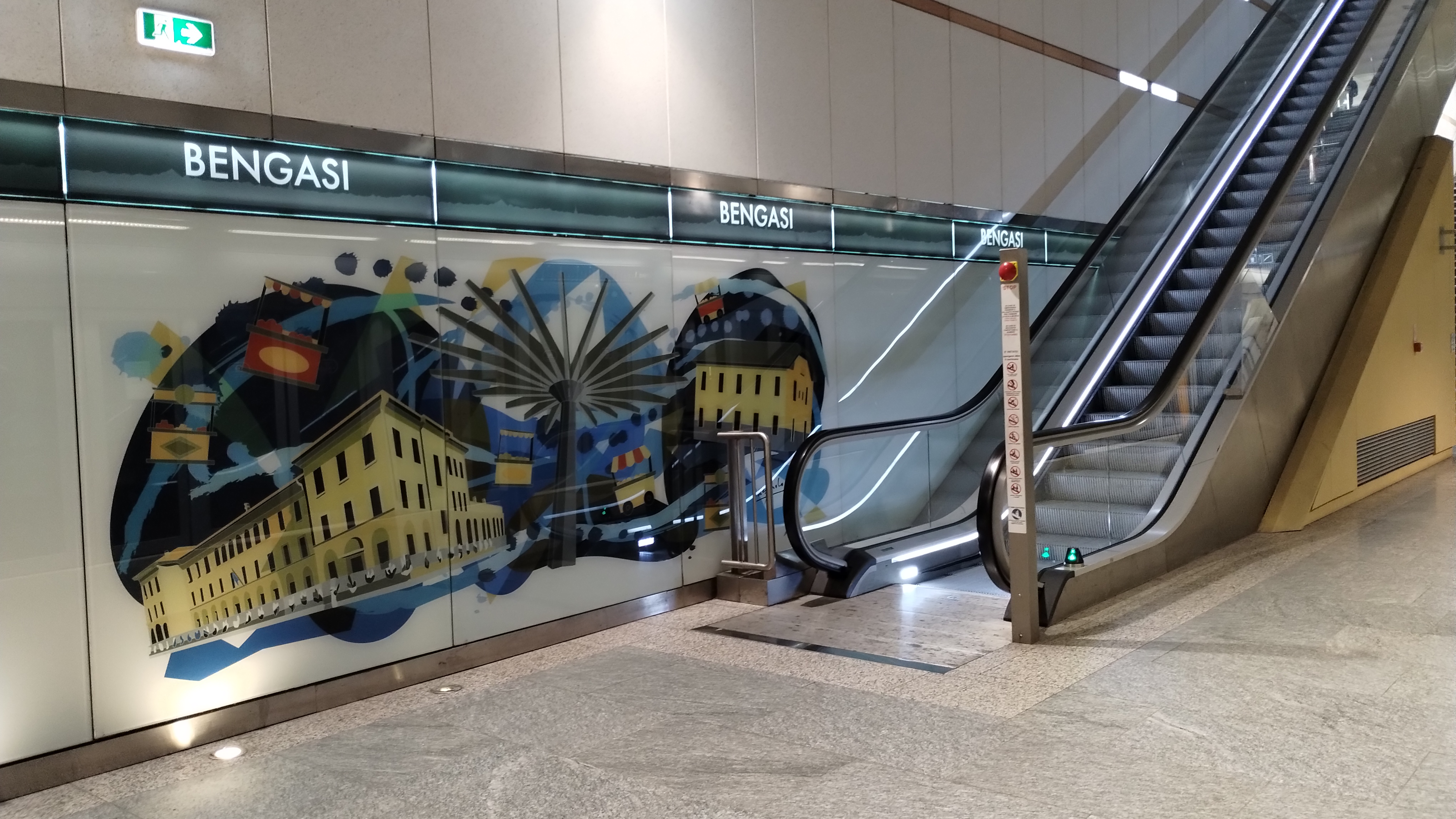

General information
- Location: Piazza Bengasi, Turin
- Coordinates: 45.017729°N 7.661805°E
- Owner: GTT
- Platforms: 2
- Tracks: 2

Construction
- Structure type: Underground
- Accessible: Yes

History
- Opened: 23 April 2021

Services
Preceding station	Turin Metro	Following station
Italia '61 towards Fermi	Line 1	Terminus
Location

Bengasi is a station of the Turin Metro in Turin, Italy, opened on 23 April 2021. It was one of two stations opened in 2021 as part of the Line 1 southern extension. The station is located under Piazza Bengasi, near the city limits of Turin and Moncalieri. As of April 2021, it is the southernmost terminus station for Line 1, previously it was Lingotto.

Upon her visit to the construction site in November 2020, the mayor of Turin, Chiara Appendino, called the completion of Bengasi station a priority for her administration, acknowledging that the work, now in the final stages, has had a significant impact on the daily life of residents in the neighborhood. She also confirmed Spring 2021 as the scheduled opening to the public.
