= Vercelli (surname) =

Vercelli is a surname. Notable people with the surname include:

- Celestino Vercelli (1946–2020), Italian racing cyclist
- Luigi Vercelli (1898–1972), Italian footballer

== See also ==
- Albert of Vercelli (died 1214)
- Atto of Vercelli (died 961), Lombard who became bishop of Vercelli in 924
- Eusebius of Vercelli (283–371), bishop from Sardinia and is counted a saint
- John of Vercelli (1200s–1283)
- Leo of Vercelli (died 1026), German prelate who served as the Bishop of Vercelli from 999
- Theonestus of Vercelli, venerated as a martyr by the Catholic Church
