= Piedmontese literature =

Overview of literature in the Piedmontese language

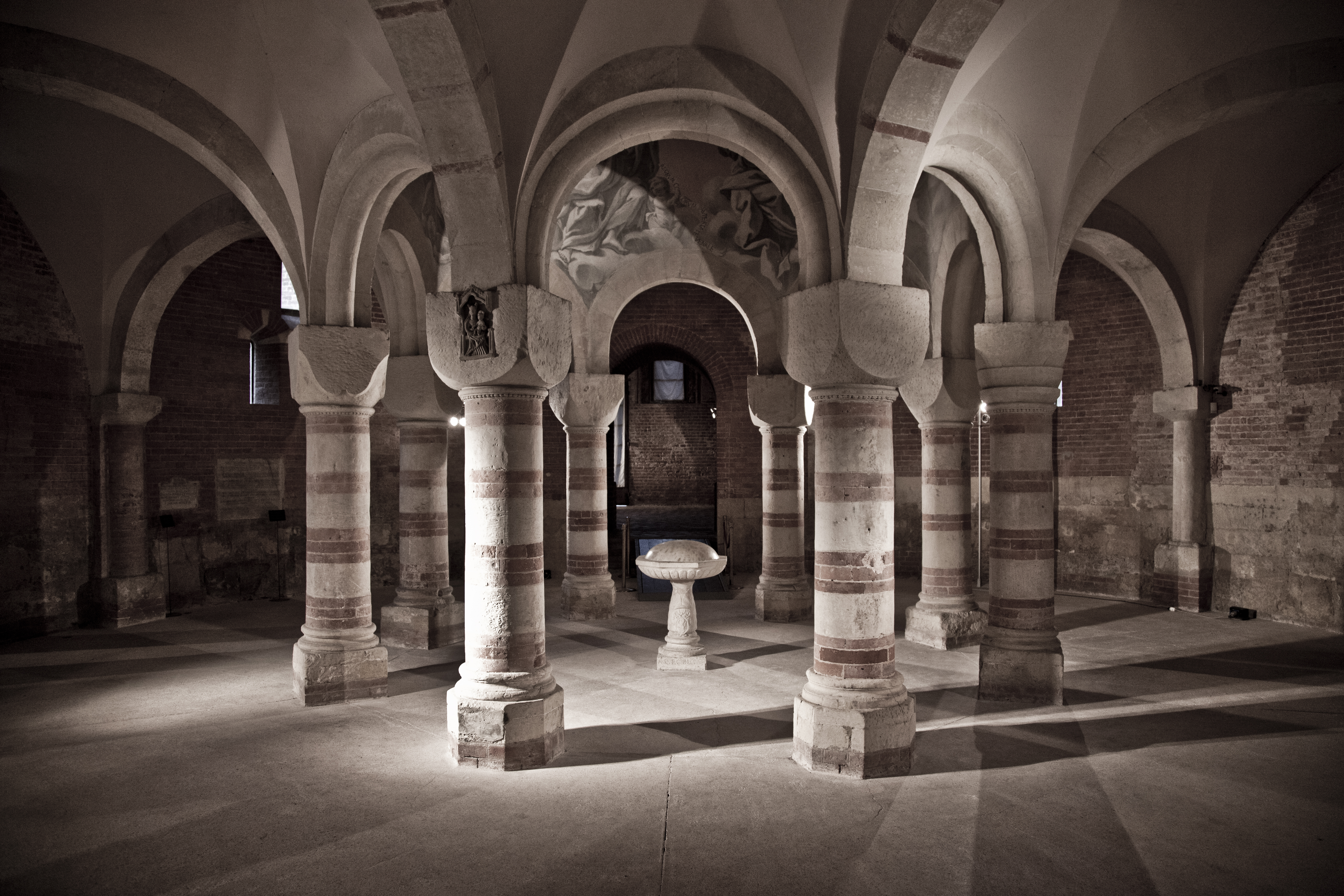
The Baptistery of San Pietro in Consavia in Asti. Built in the 12th century by the Knights Hospitaller, it represents the cultural environment of the era of the Sermoni Subalpini.

Literature written in the Piedmontese language, a Romance language derived from Latin, spans the period from the Middle Ages to the present day. Unlike other regional traditions, its earliest testimonies reflect a strong civic and religious character alongside literary expression. Key milestones include the 12th-century Sermoni Subalpini, the humanist farces of Giovan Giorgio Alione, and the development of a distinct theatrical tradition in the 17th and 18th centuries.

In the modern era, the literature underwent a formal renewal through movements such as the Companìa dij Brandé, which sought to establish rigorous linguistic standards. The tradition has gained international academic interest, particularly from German philologists and North American scholars, who have studied Piedmontese as a language of intellectual and cultural exchange. Today, the language continues to be a medium for contemporary poetry, prose, and musical composition.

== Origins ==
The first evidence of the formation of the Piedmontese vernacular was found in the Church of Santa Maria Maggiore in Vercelli, in the form of a floor mosaic dating to 1040. The second is an inscription in the Church of Sant'Evasio in Casale Monferrato. An inscription attached to a late 11th- or early 12th-century fresco in the Baptistère Saint-Jean in Poitiers may be in Piedmontese; it reads Cil cria marci e turna, "He begged for mercy and turned".

The first substantial text in the vernacular is the so-called Sermoni subalpini (Subalpine Sermons) from 1150, preserved in the National University Library of Turin. These consist of 22 complete sermons written as liturgical commentaries, intended as educational texts for schools training Knights Templar. Such schools were common in Piedmont at the time, as the region was situated along the Via Francigena pilgrimage route. During the 12th and 13th centuries, many troubadours arrived at the courts of Saluzzo, Montferrat, and Savoy, bringing the values of courtly love in Occitan. The only author to leave works in the local vernacular regarding this theme was Nicoletto da Torino. There is, however, a Piedmontese translation of an Occitan alba, Reis glorios, by Giraut de Borneil. The translation was made before 1240.

In the following centuries, Piedmontese began to establish itself as a ministerial language, replacing Latin. In addition to religious literature, such as the Passione di Revello, official documents, statutes, and historical chronicles like the Cronaca di Saluzzo were written in Piedmontese. A Piedmontese theatre also developed, primarily focusing on religious subjects; its most famous works are Ël Gelind and La Natività (The Nativity).

Other early testimonies include: Il detto del Re e della Regina (13th century); the Statutes of the Hospice of the Society of St. George of Chieri (1321); sacred laudes from the 14th century onwards; the Canzone per la presa di Pancelé (1410); and the Sentence of Rivàuta (1446).

== Intermediate period ==
With the spread of Humanist culture, Piedmontese produced a significant author: Giovan Giorgio Alione of Asti (1460–1529), who wrote his Opera Iocunda, a collection of ten humorous farces. At the end of the 17th century, the comedy Ël Cont Piolèt by Carlo Giambattista Tana marked the birth of modern Piedmontese theater.

Also dating to the 1600s are the Freschi della villa, four anonymous compositions found in 1968 in the Royal Library of Turin. They belong to the genre of tòni, a form of popular satirical literature.

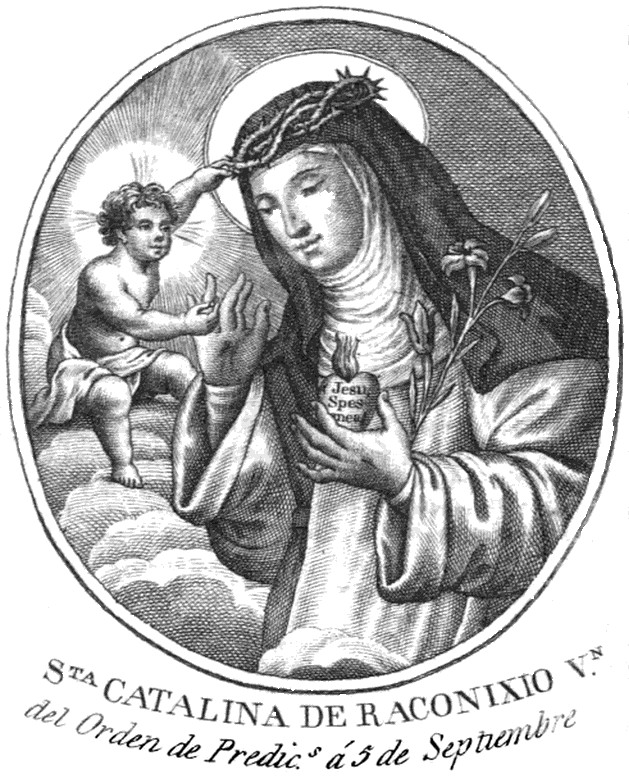
An 18th-century engraving of Catherine of Racconigi (Caterina Mattei)

Alongside this tradition, a popular mysticism flourished. Notable examples of female mystics whose spiritual legacy and oral teachings were rooted in the local dialects include Maria degli Angeli Fontanella, Caterina Mattei, and Maddalena Panattieri.

== Modern literature ==
In the 18th century, popular songs took on recognized poetic and musical forms, according to the research of Leone Sinigaglia and Costantino Nigra. This was the period when Piedmontese letters experienced a significant period of development. Notable works include L'Arpa discordata, the satirical songs of Father Ignazio Isler (1702–1788), and the first Piedmontese grammar by Maurizio Pipino.

In 1773, Edoardo Ignazio Calvo was born in Turin. His Fàule moraj (Moral Fables) is considered a primary example of civil poetry for the Piedmontese nation.

== International relations and linguistic heritage ==
The Piedmontese literary vocabulary reflects centuries of international exchanges. As documented in the Glossario Etimologico Piemontese (1888) by Maggiore Dal Pozzo, the language preserves traces of various European influences. A curious example is the expression andè an Inghildòn (literally "to go to England"), used in idiomatic expressions to mean "going to the end of the world", reflecting the 19th-century perception of the British Isles as a distant destination.

Other etymological layers include Slavic roots, such as bigieùia ("sacred image", from Slavic bog, god) and bagàt (the magician in Tarot, from Slavic bogàtsc, rich man), as well as Germanic influences like andi (momentum) and a randa (close to).

== The 19th century: theatre and satire ==
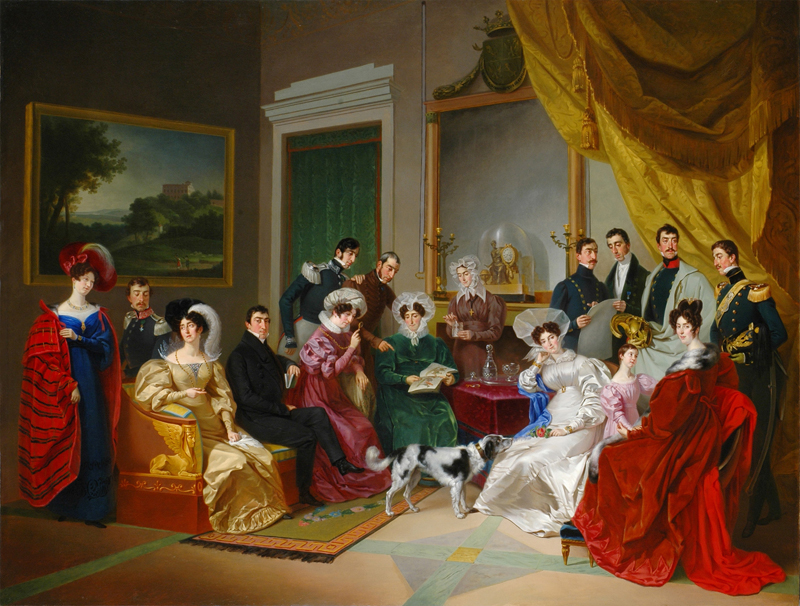
The La Marmora family in a 19th-century portrait

The 19th century was characterized by a significant increase in literary production, which actively participated in the political debates of the Risorgimento. Among the poets, the most prominent were Angelo Brofferio and Norberto Rosa. The theater also expanded significantly, featuring authors such as Bersezio, Garelli, and Pietracqua.

In the final decades of the century, the newspaper 'L Birichin gained popularity. Notably, the novel Ij delit d'na bela fija, written by Carolina Invernizio, was serialized in its pages between 1889 and 1890.

=== Judeo-Piedmontese literature ===
A unique branch of this tradition is Judeo-Piedmontese, where Hebrew and Aramaic terms were integrated into the Piedmontese structure. This dialectal hybrid produced works such as the mock-heroic poem La gran battaja dj'abrei d'Moncalv. In the 20th century, this heritage was popularized by Primo Levi, who dedicated the opening chapter of his book The Periodic Table to the language of his ancestors.

The Judeo-Piedmontese tradition also included literary and cultural figures such as Dario Cesulani (born Cesare Israel Laudi, 1880–1952), a contributor to 'L Birichin and the periodical 'L caval 'd brons. His work, Noè ant l'intimità dl'arca (1884), is an example of early 20th-century Piedmontese production. Another figure was Giulio Segre (1881–1952), a mohel in Turin's Jewish community. During the implementation of the Italian racial laws, Segre received solidarity from the poet Nino Costa. During the Nazi occupation, he was among the individuals hidden by Carlo Angela in the "Villa Turina" clinic. After the war, Segre documented the cultural ties between the Jewish community and Piedmontese literary circles.

== The 20th century: commitment and renewal ==
In the 20th century, Piedmontese literature underwent an aesthetic renewal. The poets Nino Costa and Pinin Pacòt, along with the prose writer Arrigo Frusta, moved toward broader European literary trends.

A pivotal moment was the foundation of the Companìa dij Brandé in 1927 by Pacòt, Oreste Gallina, and Alfredo Formica. This movement sought to give Piedmontese poetry a new dignity, establishing a formal standard.

Other contributors to this era include Luigi Olivero, Camillo Brero, Tavo Burat, and Barba Tòni (Antonio Bodrero). Female presence also became visible, with authors such as Anita Giraudi and Bianca Dorato.

== Contemporary literature and academic internationalization ==
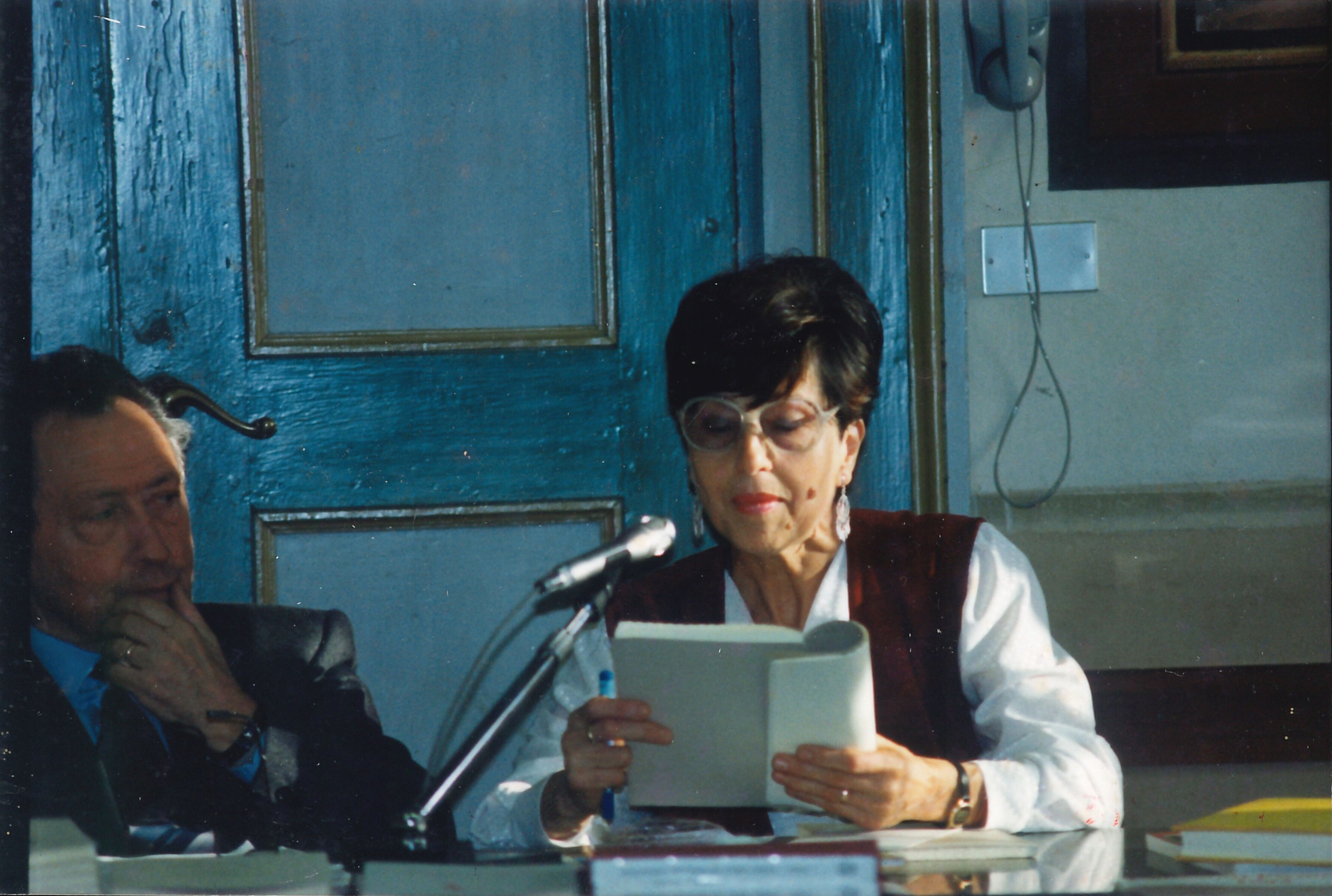
Piedmontese writers Carla Bellato Ortale and Camillo Brero.

Beginning in the 1980s, Piedmontese literature saw increased academic interest. A turning point was the publication of El ni dl'ajassa (1980) by Carlo Regis, which marked a return to local dialects through self-translation.

A role was played by the "North American bridge", where figures like Gianrenzo Clivio and Bruno Villata worked toward an internationalization of the language. Academic experiences at universities in Montreal allowed Piedmontese to be perceived as a language of intellectual exchange. This effort also involved the work of scholars like Sergio Gilardino and authors like Anita Giraudi.

A significant example of this modern hybridization is the band Mau Mau, founded in 1991 by Luca Morino, Fabio Barovero, and the Cameroonian percussionist Tatè Nsongan. Their debut EP, Soma la macia (1992), was written entirely in Piedmontese, blending local tradition with world music. The group gained international acclaim, performing at major festivals across Europe and the Middle East.

Today, the language's continued production is observed in a new generation of authors and artists. Alongside the magazine Piemonteis Ancheuj, founded by Camillo Brero and currently directed by Michele Bonavero, blogs and digital platforms have become venues for Piedmontese identity. A comprehensive updated overview of this entire literary production is provided by the 2024 anthology edited by Giovanni Tesio and Albina Malerba, which also acknowledges the foundational work of scholars like Pier Vincenzo Mengaldo.

== See also ==
- Piedmontese language
- History of Piedmont

== Bibliography ==
- Remigio Bertolino and Nicola Duberti (eds.), Nonostante il crepuscolo. Voci contemporanee della poesia in Piemonte, Lanciano, Carabba, 2023. ISBN 978-8863447163.
- Camillo Brero, Storia della letteratura piemontese, Torino, Piemonte in Bancarella, 1981.
- Gianrenzo P. Clivio, Profilo di storia della letteratura in piemontese, Torino, Centro Studi Piemontesi, 2002. ISBN 978-88-8262-072-1.
- Lorenzo Ferrarotti, L'Opera Jocunda di Giovan Giorgio Alione, Torino, Centro Studi Piemontesi, 2024. ISBN 978-88-8262-337-1.
- Renzo Gandolfo, La letteratura in piemontese dalle origini al Risorgimento, Torino, Centro Studi Piemontesi, 1972.
- Giovanni Tesio and Albina Malerba (eds.), Poeti in piemontese dal Novecento ai giorni nostri. Raccolta antologica, Torino, Centro Studi Piemontesi, 2024. ISBN 978-8882623456.
- Giuseppe Pacotto, La letteratura in piemontese, Torino, Casanova, 1967.
- Carlo Regis, El ni dl'ajassa, Mondovì, Cenacolo monregalese, 1980.
