= Secondo Pollo =

Italian Roman Catholic priest and chaplain

Blessed Secondo Pollo

Priest
- Born: 8 January 1908; Caresanablot, Vercelli, Kingdom of Italy
- Died: 26 December 1941 (aged 33); Cervice, Turin, Kingdom of Italy
- Resting place: Vercelli Cathedral, Italy
- Venerated in: Roman Catholic Church
- Beatified: 23 May 1998, Vercelli, Italy by Pope John Paul II
- Feast: 26 December
- Patronage: Chaplains

Secondo Pollo (2 January 1908 – 26 December 1941) was an Italian Roman Catholic priest and a chaplain who served in World War II. He died during a skirmish in 1941 in which a bullet struck him while he attended to a wounded comrade.

Pollo received beatification from Pope John Paul II in 1998 during the latter's apostolic visit to Vercelli.

== Life ==
Secondo Pollo was born in 1908 in Vercelli. He had an intense love for the Eucharist as a child and desired to become a priest during that time.

The Institute of the Brothers of the Christian Schools oversaw his childhood education. At the age of eleven in 1919 he commenced his studies for the priesthood and remained there until the completion of his high school studies. He began his theological studies in Rome and in 1931 graduated in philosophical studies at the Pontifical Academy of St. Thomas Aquinas and in theological studies at the Pontifical Gregorian University. Those around him considered him to be a model seminarian.

He received the minor orders and the diaconate around the late 1920s or the earliest of the 1930s for he was ordained as a priest on 15 August 1931. He received his ordination from the Archbishop of Vercelli Giacomo Montanelli. After Pollo's ordination he was tasked with teaching seminarians and from 1936 until in 1940 moved seminaries. Furthermore was also made an archdiocesan assistant of the Italian section of Catholic Action in September 1936. He also served as a prison chaplain.

The outbreak of World War II saw him request to become a chaplain in the ranks of soldiers despite the slight vision impairment he had. Pollo was elevated as a lieutenant captain of the 3rd Battalion "Val Chisone" of the 6th Alpine Division Alpi Graie. His peers and superiors regarded Pollo as a different kind of individual who was capable of distinguishing himself and held him in high regard.

On 26 December 1941 the battalion moved to Montenegro and then near Turin where he was struck when a bullet hit him as he tended to a wounded soldier. It hit his femoral artery which led to him bleeding to death. As he bled he said: "Look after the others; they're worse than I am". A comrade recorded Pollo's last words he whispered: "I am going to God who is so good". Pollo bowed his head and died. He was buried and then reinterred in 1961 until he was placed in the Vercelli Cathedral in 1968.

== Beatification ==
The beatification process commenced under Pope Pius XII in an informative diocesan process that commenced in 1955 and concluded its work in 1972. Theologians declared his writings to be in line with the faith and issued a decree on 29 November 1974 to affirm that the team had consulted his writings and approved them. The process was made valid on 8 November 1985 in order for the boxes of documentation from the process to be investigated in Rome.

The postulation submitted the Positio to the Congregation for the Causes of Saints in 1994 for assessment which resulted in Pollo being declared Venerable on 18 December 1997 after Pope John Paul II recognized the fact that Pollo had lived a life of the heroic virtue.

The miracle needed for his beatification was investigated in the diocese of its origin and received validation from Roman officials on 17 March 1995. Full investigation into the miracle could not go ahead until Pollo was declared Venerable - this occurred in 1997. The medical board advising the C.C.S. approved it on 5 March 1998 while theologians voiced their approval also two weeks later on 20 March. The C.C.S. followed suit on 21 April 1998 and passed it to the pope for his approval around a week later.

John Paul II presided over the beatification of Pollo during his apostolic visit to the town of Vercelli on 23 May 1998.
