= San Vincenzo Ferreri, Racconigi =

Church in the Province of Cueno, Italy

San Vincenzo Ferreri, also called San Domenico, is a church and convent in Racconigi, Province of Cuneo, region of Piedmont, Italy.

== History ==
In 1506, a Dominican order convent and seminary was established in Racconigi, which already had convents run by the Servi di Maria (c. 1460) and Carmelites (1493). The convent was patronized by Claudio of Savoy, who commissioned the convent just outside the Porta di San Giovanni in the city walls. In 1604, Bernardino II di Savoy commissioned enlargement of the church. It has three naves and two large chapels. On the left, the Chapel of the Rosary has a number of wooden paintings. On the right is the Chapel of St Catherine of Siena.

Among the lateral altars is one dedicated to Caterina Mattei, who became a Dominican nun in this church in 1514. It was assigned after a voto for the cessation of a plague epidemic in 1630. On the right, an altar is dedicated to St Pope Pius V, a former Dominican, who was born in nearby Bosco Marengo. He is said to have preached in this church.

The ceilings and cupola are decorated with quadratura frescoes (1765-1774) by Pietro Antonio Pozzo and Gallo Barelli. In the presbytery, a painting of the Santissima Annunziata is attributed to Giovanni Battista Pozzo.
