= Racconigi =

Racconigi Racunis (Piedmontese)
- Comune
- Città di Racconigi
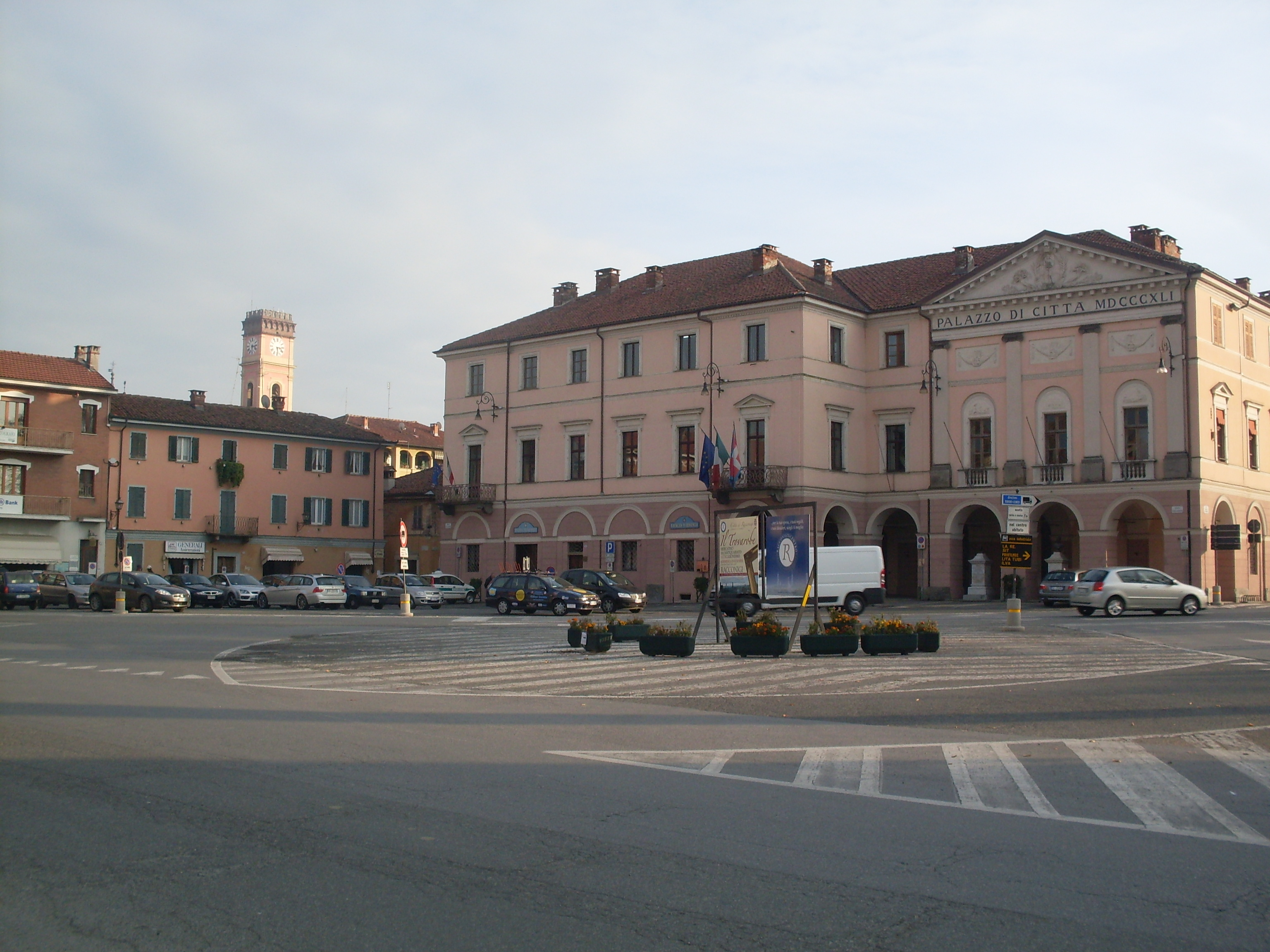
- The central Carlo Alberto Square and the Town Hall

- Coat of arms

- Location within Italy Location within Piedmont
- Coordinates: 44°46′N 07°41′E
- Country: Italy
- Region: Piedmont
- Province: Cuneo (CN)
- Frazioni: Berroni, Canapile, Migliabruna Nuova, Migliabruna Vecchia, Oia, Parruccia, San Lorenzo, Streppe, Tagliata

Government
  - Mayor: Valerio Oderda (Civic List)

Area
  - Total: 48.06 km^{2} (18.56 sq mi)
- Elevation: 260 m (850 ft)

Population (1-1-2017)
  - Total: 10,013
  - Density: 208.3/km^{2} (539.6/sq mi)
- Demonym: Racconigese (pl. -i)
- Time zone: UTC+1 (CET)
  - Summer (DST): UTC+2 (CEST)
- Postal code: 12035
- Dialing code: 0172
- Patron saint: St. John the Baptist
- Website: Official website

Racconigi (Italian: [rakkoˈniːdʒi]; Piedmontese: Racunis [rakyˈniz]) is a town and comune (municipality) in Piedmont, Italy. It is located in the province of Cuneo, 40 kilometres (25 mi) south of Turin, and 50 kilometres (31 mi) north of Cuneo by rail.

== History ==
The town was founded in medieval times. It was a possession of the marquisses of Saluzzo, of the princes of Acaia and of the Savoy-Carignano.

On 24 October 1909 King Victor Emmanuel III of Italy and Emperor Nicholas II of Russia concluded a secret agreement at Racconigi. Known as the Racconigi Bargain, Italy and Russia divided their spheres of influence in the region.

== Geography ==
Racconigi is located in the northern borders of its province with the Metropolitan City of Turin. The town borders with the municipalities of Caramagna Piemonte, Carmagnola (TO), Casalgrasso, Cavallerleone, Cavallermaggiore, Lombriasco (TO), Murello, Polonghera and Sommariva del Bosco. Its municipal hamlets (frazioni) are Berroni, Canapile, Migliabruna Nuova, Migliabruna Vecchia, Oia, Parruccia, San Lorenzo, Streppe, Tagliata.

== Economy ==
The economy is mostly based on agriculture, production of milk and meat, and industrial working of metal sheets.

== Main sights ==
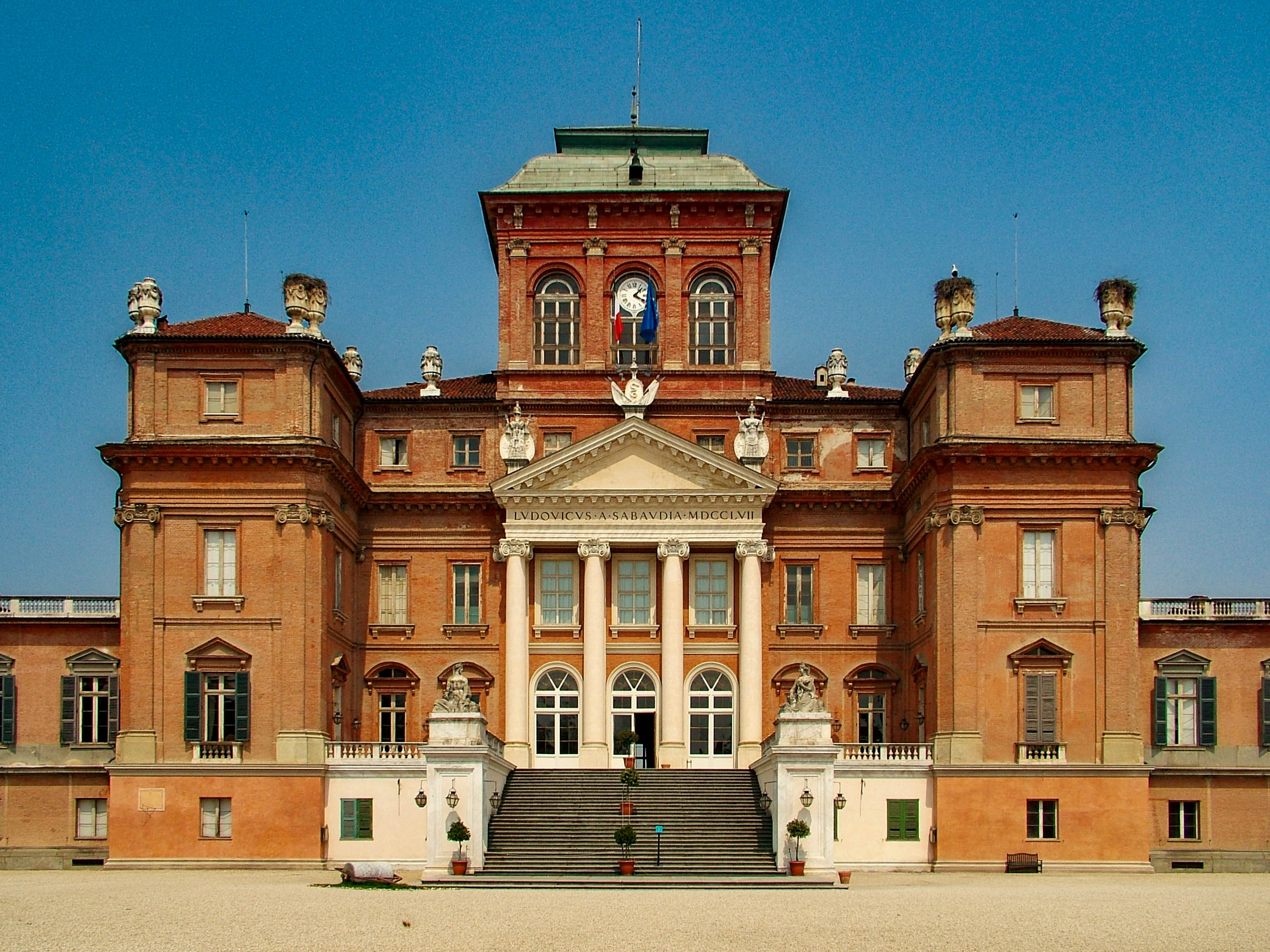
Façade of the Castle of Racconigi

- Castle of Racconigi: This royal residence built in 1570 on the basis of an earlier castle which dated to the beginning of the second millennium. The large park was laid out in 1755 by the French gardener Molard from designs by Le Nôtre, and enlarged in 1835. The castle became the summer residence of the King of Italy in 1901, and part of the World Heritage Site Residences of the Royal House of Savoy in 1997.
- San Giovanni Battista: Church
- San Domenico: Baroque church
- Santa Maria Maggiore: Baroque church
- Church of Santissimo Nome di Gesù: Baroque church
- LIPU: the Italian League for the Protection of Birds, established the Centro Anatidi e Cicogne in 1985 in a large farmhouse near the castle as a site for the reintroduction of the white stork, which became extinct in Italy as a breeding species at the beginning of the eighteenth century. The site now includes a breeding centre for various endangered species of ducks, geese and swans—notably the white-headed duck which has been extinct in Italy since 1976—and an area of wetland where visitors can observe such migrants as black-winged stilt, little ringed plover and black-tailed godwit.
- Tenuta Berroni: The estate was built in 1773 for the noble De Laugier as holiday house with beautiful gardens, a chapel and some rural buildings: it was an isolated villa in the countryside, but made entirely self-sufficient. The interior decoration and antique furniture were commissioned to the many artists who worked for Castle of Racconigi. Today it is both a private estate as well as a location for weddings, events and a set for several movies.

== Notable people ==
- Catherine of Racconigi, nun and mystic
- Francesco Imberti, archbishop of Vercelli.
- Umberto II, last King of Italy, was born here.

== Twin towns ==
- Bonneville (France) (1990)
- Cascais (Portugal) (2003)
