= Marco Arnolfo =

Monsignor Marco Arnolfo
- Archbishop of Vercelli
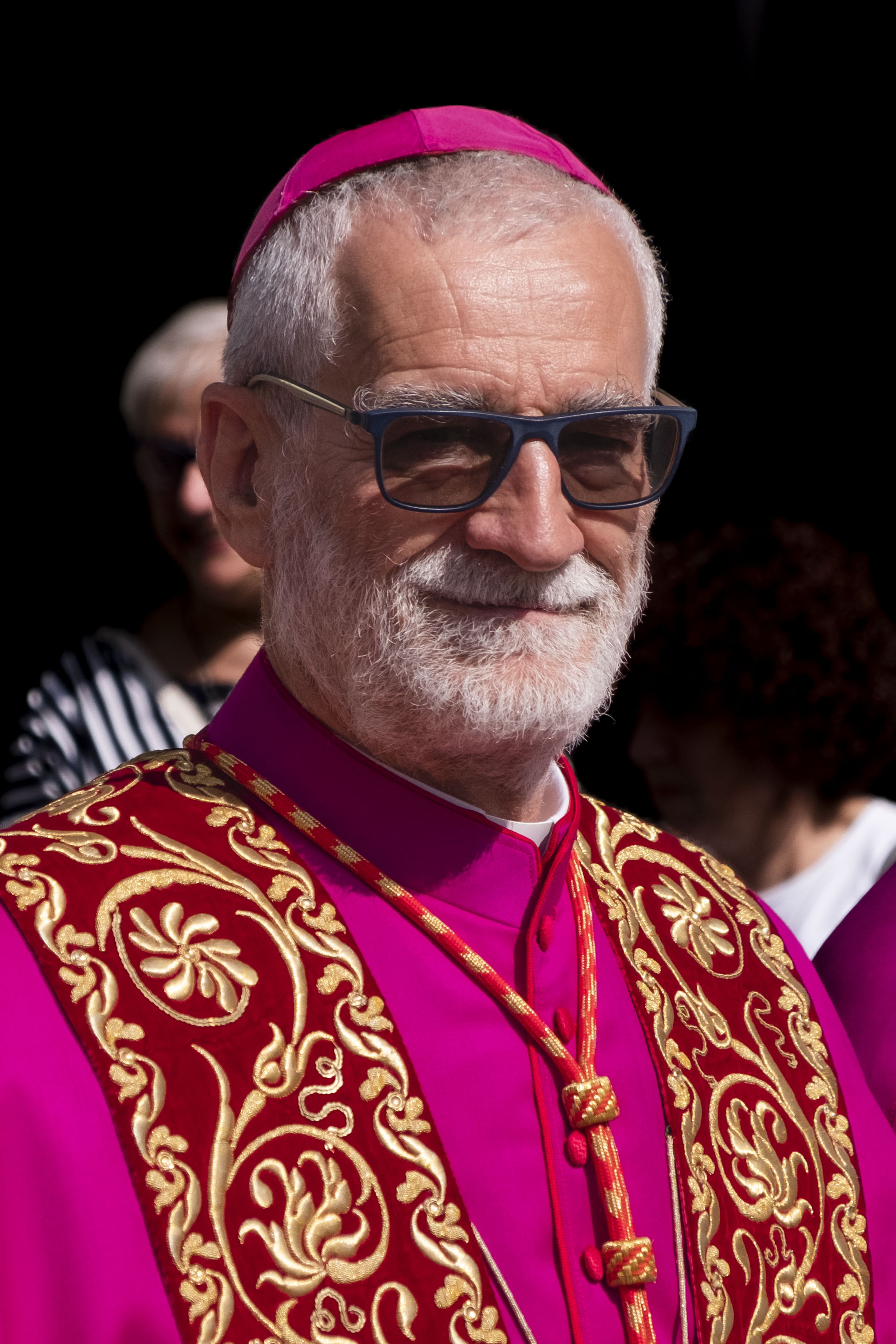
- Arnolfo in 2023
- Church: Catholic Church
- Archdiocese: Vercelli
- Appointed: 27 February 2014
- Predecessor: Enrico Masseroni

Orders
- Ordination: 25 June 1978 by Anastasio Ballestrero
- Consecration: 11 May 2014 by Cesare Nosiglia

Personal details
- Born: 10 November 1952 (age 74) Cavallermaggiore, Italy
- Education: Theological University of Northern Italy – Turin Campus; Salesian Pontifical University
- Coat of arms: Marco Arnolfo's coat of arms

Ordination history
History
Priestly ordination
- Ordained by: Anastasio Ballestrero
Episcopal consecration
- Principal consecrator: Cesare Nosiglia
- Co-consecrators: Enrico Masseroni, Gabriele Mana
Episcopal succession
Bishops consecrated by Marco Arnolfo as principal consecrator
- Cristiano Bodo: 25 March 2017

Marco Arnolfo (born 10 November 1952) is an Italian Roman Catholic prelate who has been the Archbishop of Vercelli since 2014.
