= Arturo Gentili =

Italian footballer (1936–2021)

Personal information
- Date of birth: 5 February 1936
- Place of birth: Stezzano, Italy
- Date of death: 25 May 2021 (aged 85)
- Position: Striker

Senior career*
Years	Team	Apps	(Gls)
1954–1955	Leffe		
1955–1963	Atalanta		
1963–1964	Varese		
1964–1967	Triestina		
1967–1968	Gallaratese		
- * Club domestic league appearances and goals

Arturo Gentili (5 February 1936 – 25 May 2021) was an Italian professional footballer who played as a striker.

== Career ==
Born in Stezzano, Gentili played for Leffe, Atalanta (with whom he won the 1962–63 Italian Cup), Varese, Triestina and Gallaratese.
