= Polonghera =

- Comune
- Comune di Polonghera
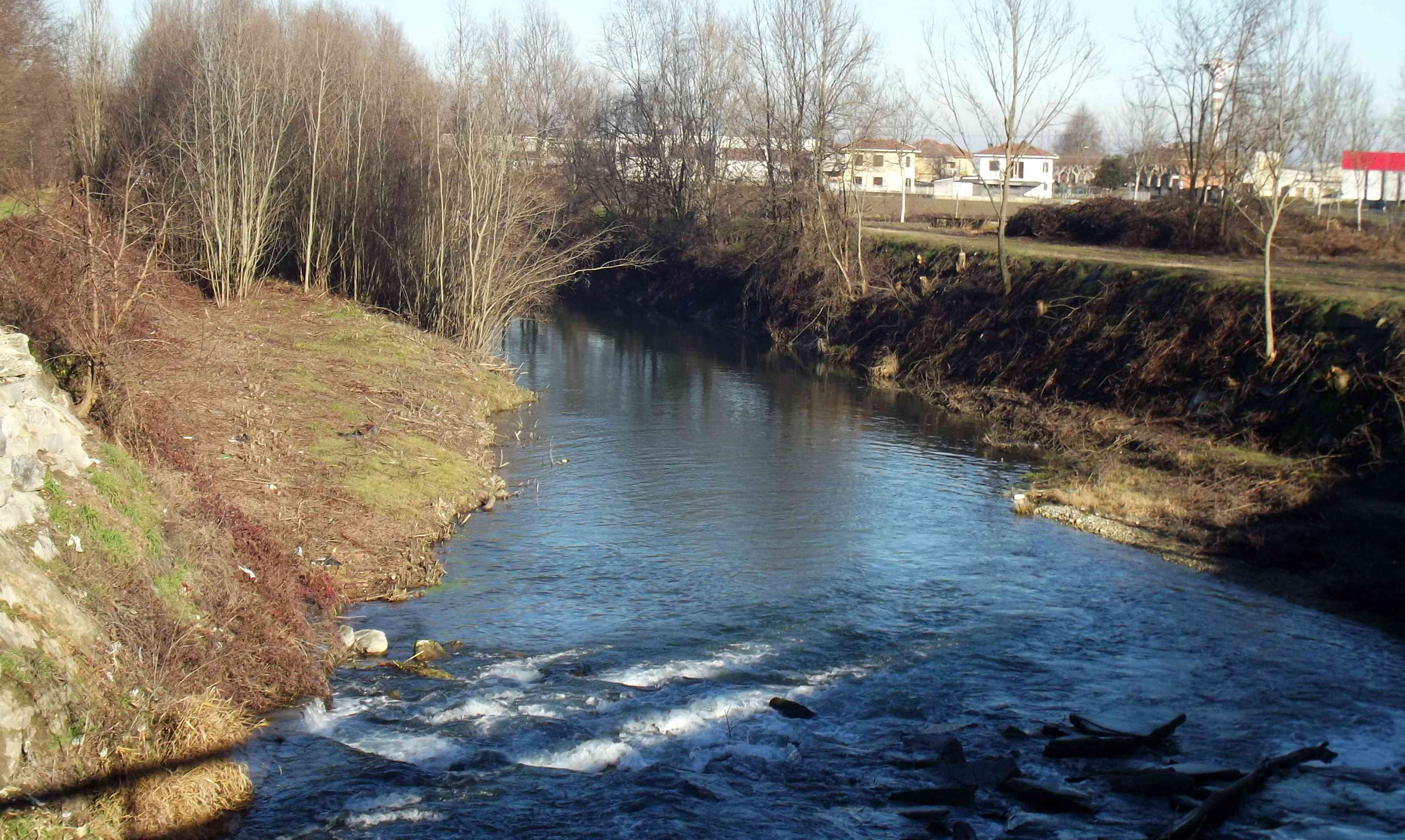
- The Varaita river at Polonghera.

- Location within Italy Location within Piedmont
- Coordinates: 44°48′N 7°36′E
- Country: Italy
- Region: Piedmont
- Province: Cuneo (CN)
- Frazioni: Ghigo

Government
  - Mayor: Gianmaria Bosco

Area
  - Total: 10.31 km^{2} (3.98 sq mi)
- Elevation: 245 m (804 ft)

Population (1 January 2024)
  - Total: 1,124
  - Density: 109.0/km^{2} (282.4/sq mi)
- Demonym: Polongherese(i)
- Time zone: UTC+1 (CET)
  - Summer (DST): UTC+2 (CEST)
- Postal code: 12030
- Dialing code: 011
- Patron saint: San Severiano
- Saint day: first sunday of August
- Website: Official website

Polonghera is a comune (municipality) in the Province of Cuneo in the Italian region Piedmont, located about 30 kilometres (19 mi) south of Turin and about 45 kilometres (28 mi) north of Cuneo.

Polonghera borders the following municipalities: Casalgrasso, Faule, Moretta, Murello, Pancalieri, and Racconigi.
