= Scarnafigi =

- Comune
- Comune di Scarnafigi
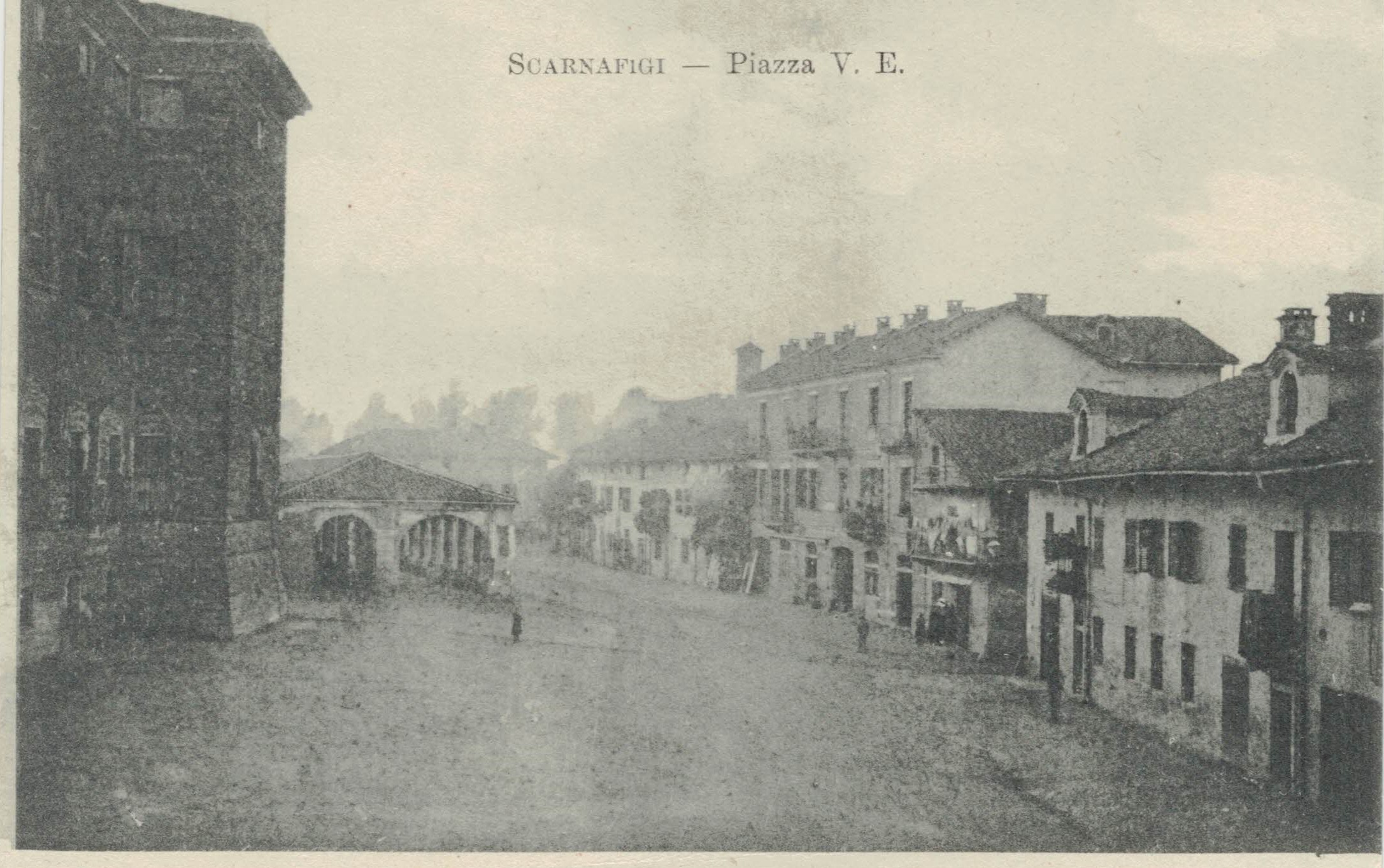

- Location within Piedmont Location within Italy
- Coordinates: 44°41′N 7°34′E
- Country: Italy
- Region: Piedmont
- Province: Cuneo (CN)

Government
  - Mayor: Riccardo Ghigo

Area
  - Total: 30.4 km^{2} (11.7 sq mi)
- Elevation: 296 m (971 ft)

Population (31 December 2014)
  - Total: 2,176
  - Density: 71.6/km^{2} (185/sq mi)
- Demonym: Scarnafigesi
- Time zone: UTC+1 (CET)
  - Summer (DST): UTC+2 (CEST)
- Postal code: 12030
- Dialing code: 0175
- Website: Official website

Scarnafigi is a comune (municipality) in the Province of Cuneo in the Italian region Piedmont, located about 45 kilometres (28 mi) south of Turin and about 35 kilometres (22 mi) north of Cuneo.

Scarnafigi borders the following municipalities: Lagnasco, Monasterolo di Savigliano, Ruffia, Saluzzo, Savigliano, Torre San Giorgio, and Villanova Solaro.
