= Ruffia =

- Comune
- Comune di Ruffia
- Location within Italy Location within Piedmont
- Coordinates: 44°42′N 7°36′E
- Country: Italy
- Region: Piedmont
- Province: Province of Cuneo (CN)

Government
  - Mayor: Giampiero Boaglio (Civic list)

Area
  - Total: 7.51 km^{2} (2.90 sq mi)

Population (1-1-2017)
  - Total: 366
  - Density: 48.7/km^{2} (126/sq mi)
- Demonym: Ruffiese(i)
- Time zone: UTC+1 (CET)
  - Summer (DST): UTC+2 (CEST)
- Postal code: 12030
- Dialing code: 0172

Ruffia is a comune (municipality) in the Province of Cuneo in the Italian region Piedmont, located about 40 kilometres (25 mi) south of Turin and about 35 kilometres (22 mi) north of Cuneo. As of 1-1-2017, it had a population of 366 and an area of 7.51 square kilometres (2.90 mi^{2}).

Ruffia borders the following municipalities: Cavallerleone, Cavallermaggiore, Monasterolo di Savigliano, Murello, Scarnafigi, and Villanova Solaro.

== Demographic evolution ==
Historical population

Year	Pop.	±%
1861	651	—
1871	710	+9.1%
1881	721	+1.5%
1901	670	−7.1%
1911	681	+1.6%

Year	Pop.	±%
1921	660	−3.1%
1931	621	−5.9%
1936	597	−3.9%
1951	570	−4.5%
1961	400	−29.8%

Year	Pop.	±%
1971	335	−16.2%
1981	299	−10.7%
1991	278	−7.0%
2001	311	+11.9%

Source: Data from ISTAT
