= Torre San Giorgio =

- Comune
- Comune di Torre San Giorgio
- Location within Italy Location within Piedmont
- Coordinates: 44°44′N 7°31′E
- Country: Italy
- Region: Piedmont
- Province: Province of Cuneo (CN)

Area
  - Total: 5.4 km^{2} (2.1 sq mi)
- Elevation: 262 m (860 ft)

Population (Dec. 2004)
  - Total: 696
  - Density: 130/km^{2} (330/sq mi)
- Demonym: Torresangiorgesi
- Time zone: UTC+1 (CET)
  - Summer (DST): UTC+2 (CEST)
- Postal code: 12030
- Dialing code: 0172
- Website: Official website

Torre San Giorgio is a comune (municipality) in the Province of Cuneo in the Italian region Piedmont, located about 40 kilometres (25 mi) southwest of Turin and about 40 kilometres (25 mi) north of Cuneo. As of 31 December 2004, it had a population of 696 and an area of 5.4 square kilometres (2.1 mi^{2}).

Torre San Giorgio borders the following municipalities: Moretta, Saluzzo, Scarnafigi, and Villanova Solaro.

== Demographic evolution ==
Historical population

Year	Pop.	±%
1861	857	—
1871	850	−0.8%
1881	747	−12.1%
1901	678	−9.2%
1911	673	−0.7%

Year	Pop.	±%
1921	642	−4.6%
1931	621	−3.3%
1936	632	+1.8%
1951	657	+4.0%
1961	579	−11.9%

Year	Pop.	±%
1971	524	−9.5%
1981	620	+18.3%
1991	660	+6.5%
2001	672	+1.8%

Source: Data from ISTAT
