= Chiesa del Santissimo Nome di Gesù, Racconigi =

Roman Catholic church in Piedmont, Italy

Coordinates: 45.0001°N 7.6842°E

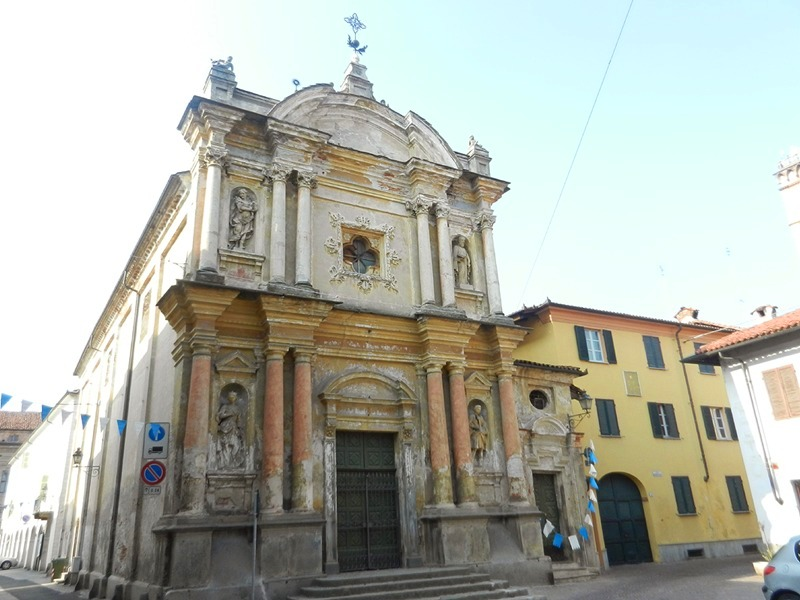

The Chiesa del Santissimo Nome di Gesù, or Church of the Most Holy Name of Jesus, is a Baroque-style, Roman Catholic church or oratory in Racconigi, Province of Cuneo, region of Piedmont, Italy.

== History ==
The church was erected by the confraternity of the same name as the church, founded in 1578 and dedicated to charity. The name was likely inspired by St Bernardino da Siena, whose monogram is found on the wall of the church. The present oratory was built in 1659. A Te Deum was held in the church to celebrate the assignment in 1757 of the title of Duke of Carignano to Vittorio Amedeo, who became rector of the confraternity. Today the church houses a processional mechanical nativity scene (Presepe Meccanico).
