= Murello =

- Comune
- Comune di Murello
- Location within Italy Location within Piedmont
- Coordinates: 44°45′N 7°36′E
- Country: Italy
- Region: Piedmont
- Province: Province of Cuneo (CN)
- Frazioni: Bonavalle, Tetti Spertini, Tetti Spertini Sotto

Government
  - Mayor: Fabrizio Milla

Area
  - Total: 17.33 km^{2} (6.69 sq mi)
- Elevation: 260 m (850 ft)

Population (1-1-2017)
  - Total: 961
  - Density: 55.5/km^{2} (144/sq mi)
- Demonym: Murellese(i)
- Time zone: UTC+1 (CET)
  - Summer (DST): UTC+2 (CEST)
- Postal code: 12030
- Dialing code: 0172

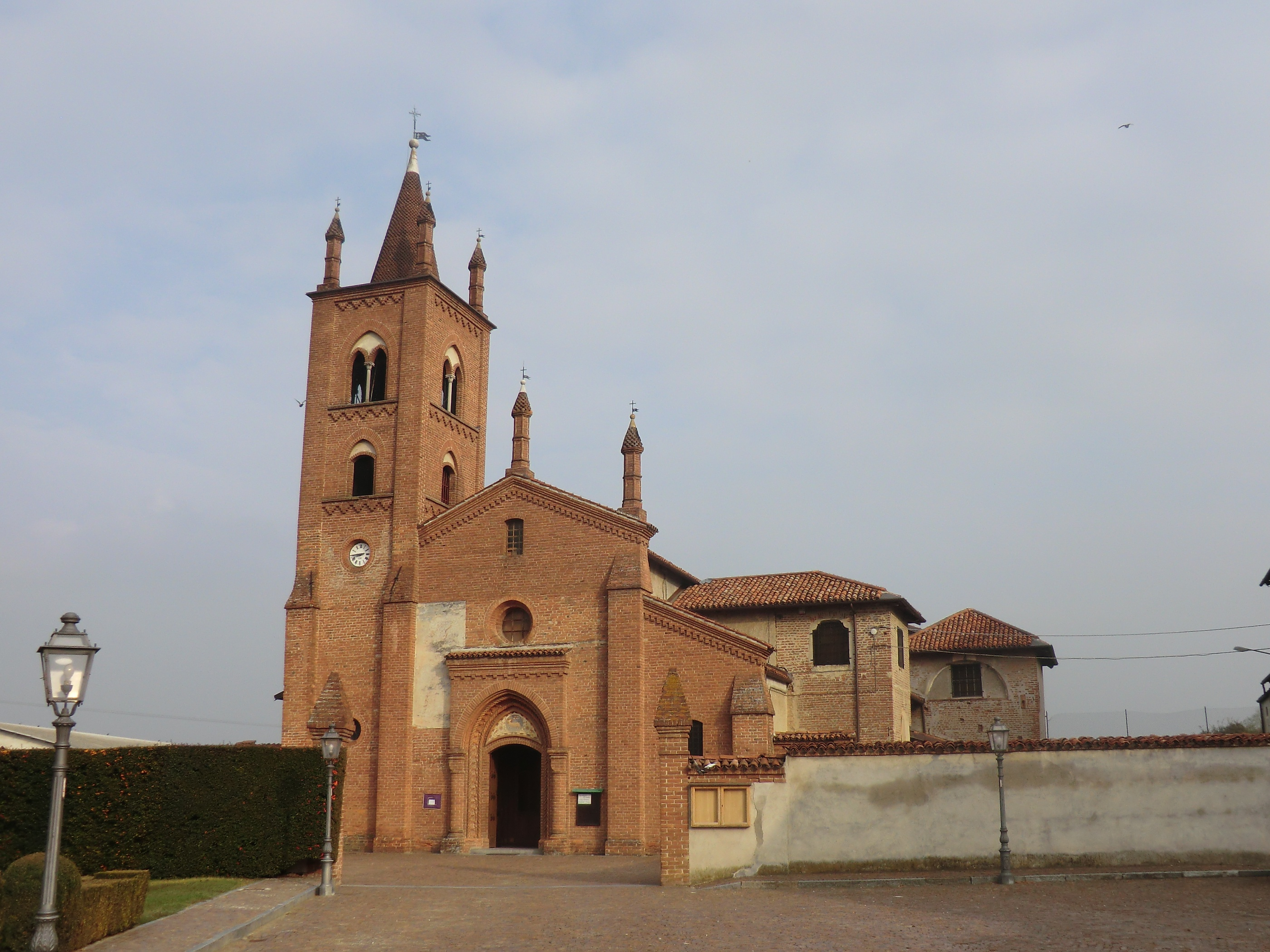

Murello is a comune (municipality) in the Province of Cuneo in the Italian region Piedmont, located about 35 kilometres (22 mi) south of Turin and about 40 kilometres (25 mi) north of Cuneo. As of 1-1-2017, it had a population of 961 and an area of 17.33 square kilometres (6.69 mi^{2}).

Murello borders the following municipalities: Cavallerleone, Moretta, Polonghera, Racconigi, Ruffia, and Villanova Solaro.

== Demographic evolution ==
Historical population

Year	Pop.	±%
1861	1,572	—
1871	1,651	+5.0%
1881	1,617	−2.1%
1901	1,460	−9.7%
1911	1,592	+9.0%

Year	Pop.	±%
1921	1,598	+0.4%
1931	1,499	−6.2%
1936	1,483	−1.1%
1951	1,428	−3.7%
1961	1,172	−17.9%

Year	Pop.	±%
1971	1,026	−12.5%
1981	967	−5.8%
1991	946	−2.2%
2001	899	−5.0%

Source: Data from ISTAT
