= Enrico Masseroni =

Italian Roman Catholic archbishop (1939–2019)

- Archbishop of Vercelli
- Church: Catholic Church
- Archdiocese: Archdiocese of Vercelli
- In office: 10 February 1996 – 27 February 2014
- Predecessor: Tarcisio Bertone
- Successor: Marco Arnolfo
- Previous post: Bishop of Mondovì (1987-1996)

Orders
- Ordination: 29 June 1963 by Placido Maria Cambiaghi
- Consecration: 8 December 1987 by Aldo Del Monte

Personal details
- Born: 20 February 1939 Borgomanero, Province of Novara, Kingdom of Italy
- Died: 30 September 2019 (aged 80) Moncrivello, Province of Vercelli, Italy

Enrico Masseroni (20 February 1939 – 30 September 2019) was an Italian Roman Catholic archbishop.

Masseroni was born in Italy and was ordained to the priesthood in 1963. He served as bishop of the Roman Catholic Diocese of Mondovi, Italy, from 1987 to 1996 and as archbishop of the Roman Catholic Archdiocese of Vercelli, Italy, from 1996 to 2014.
