= Archdiocese of Vercelli =

Roman Catholic archdiocese in Italy

Archdiocese of Vercelli Archidioecesis Vercellensis

Catholic
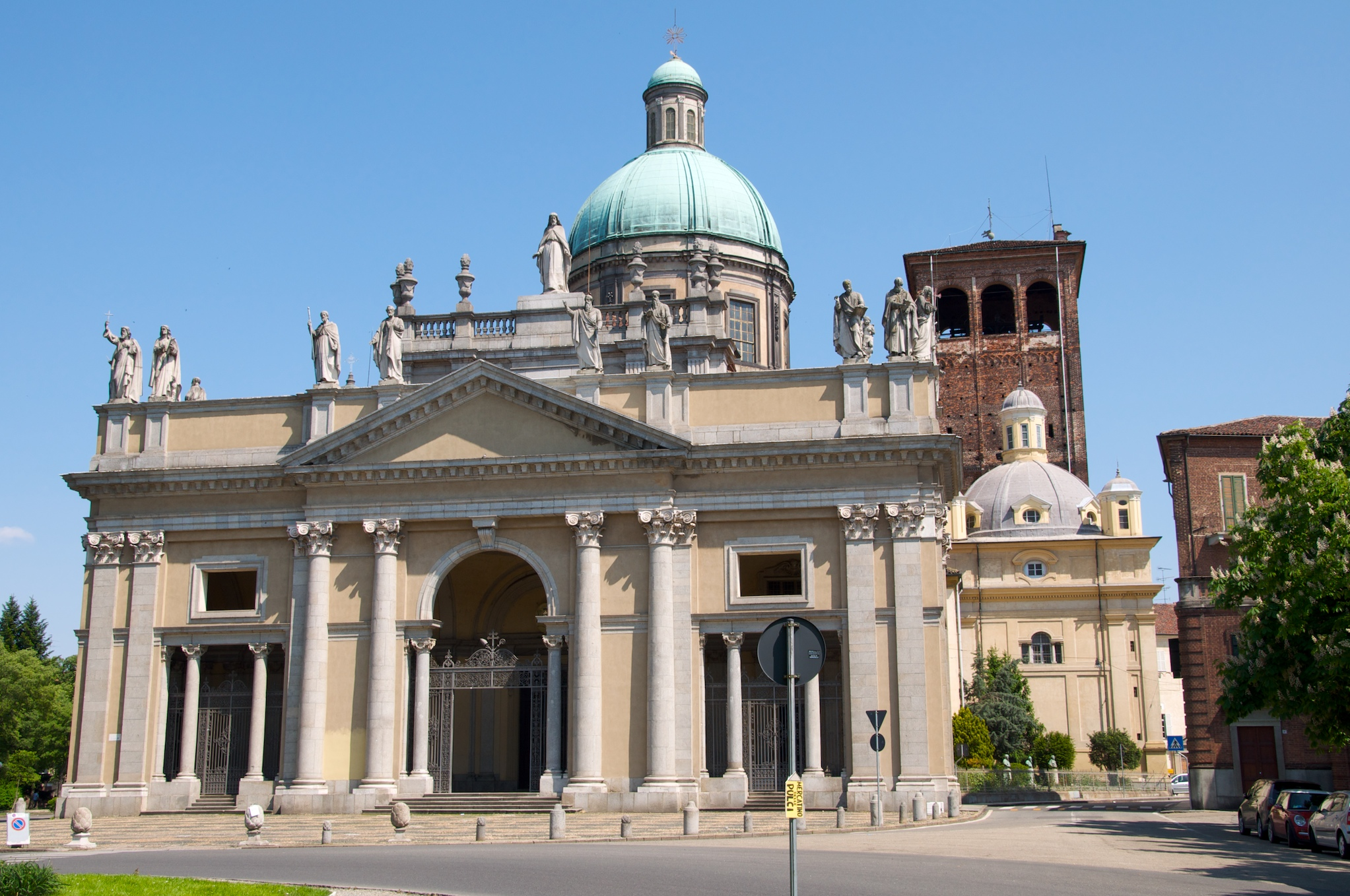
- Vercelli Cathedral

Location
- Country: Italy
- Ecclesiastical province: Vercelli

Statistics
- Area: 1,658 km^{2} (640 sq mi)
- Population: Total; Catholics: (as of 2023); 166,083 ▼; 152,381 ▼ (91.7%)
- Parishes: 117

Information
- Denomination: Catholic Church
- Rite: Roman Rite
- Established: mid-4th century
- Cathedral: Cattedrale-Basilica di S. Eusebio
- Secular priests: 61 (diocesan) ▼16 (Religious Orders) ▲14 Permanent Deacons ▼

Current leadership
- Pope: Leo XIV
- Archbishop: Marco Arnolfo

Map

Website
- www.arcidiocesi.vc.it

The Archdiocese of Vercelli (Latin: Archidioecesis Vercellensis) is a Latin Metropolitan archdiocese of the Catholic Church in northern Italy, one of the two archdioceses which, together with their suffragan dioceses, form the ecclesiastical region of Piedmont.

The archbishop's seat is in Basilica Cattedrale di S. Eusebio, a minor basilica dedicated to its canonized first bishop, in Vercelli, Piemonte (Piedmont). The city also has two Minor basilicas: Basilica di S. Andrea and Basilica di S. Maria Maggiore

== Ecclesiastical province ==
The suffragan dioceses forming part of the ecclesiastical province of Vercelli are:

- Diocese of Alessandria
- Diocese of Biella
- Diocese of Casale Monferrato
- Diocese of Novara.

== History ==
According to an ancient lectionary, Christianity was first preached in Vercelli in the second half of the third century by Saints Sabinianus (Savinian) and Martialis, bishops from Gaul, when they were returning to their dioceses. The episcopal see, however, was not established until after the Peace of Constantine.

The first bishop of Vercelli was Eusebius, a native of Sardinia, who had been a "lector" in the Roman church. Ambrose of Milan says that he became familiar to the Christians of Vercelli, who unanimously petitioned that he be made their bishop. He was the recipient of letters from Pope Liberius in 353, 354, and 355; and took part in the synod of Milan of 355, where he refused to sign the Arian condemnation of Bishop Athanasius of Alexandria. For his obstinacy, he was exiled by the Emperor Constantius to Palestine. On Constantius' death in 361, he was recalled and visited Alexandria, where he attended a synod with Athanasius in 362. He died in 369 (according to Jerome), in 370, or in 371.

From the beginning to 1805, the diocese of Vercelli was a suffragan (subordinate) of the metropolitan archbishopric of Milan.

From Eusebius to Nottingo (830) there were forty bishops, whose images were preserved in the Eusebian basilica, predecessor of the present cathedral, so called because Saint Eusebius, who dedicated it to the martyr Saint Theonestus, was interred in it. Bishop Nottingo introduced the common and monastic life among his clergy.

In 886, Berengar, Margrave of Friuli, in an act of revenge against Bishop Liutvard, sacked the city of Vercelli, and in particular the episcopal palace and the cathedral.

In September 1050, Pope Leo IX held a synod in Vercelli, directed against simony, against John Scotus' book on the eucharist, and against the heresies of Berengar of Tours.

In 1149, Bishop Gisulfus Avogadro was granted the title of count.

On 18 April 1474, with the bull "Pro Excellenti", Pope Sixtus IV, on the urging of Marquis Guglielmo of Monferrat, established the new Diocese of Casale Monferrato, transferring to it territories removed from the diocese of Vercelli.

The seminary of the diocese of Vercelli was established in 1566, by Cardinal Guido Luca Ferrero (1562–1566), after his return from the Council of Trent. The first residence of the seminary was in a house attached to the church of S. Pietro la Ferla. A new building was opened in 1600, and was greatly extended in 1730, and again from 1842 to 1845.

At Easter, 3 April 1575, the Church of Vercelli adopted the use of the Roman liturgy in place of the local Eusebian liturgy.

Cardinal Guido Luca Ferrero (1562–1572), Bishop of Vercelli, attended the First Provincial Council of Milan on 14 October 1565, under the presidency of Cardinal Carlo Borromeo, Archbishop of Milan. Bishop Giovanni Francesco Bonomigni (1572–1587) attended the Fourth Provincial Synod of Milan in 1576, and signed the decrees. He also attended and subscribed the decrees of the Fifth Provincial Synod of Milan in March 1579. Bishop Giovanni Francesco Bonomigni (1572–1587) was unable to attend the Sixth Provincial Synod of Milan in May 1582, since he was serving as papal nuncio to the Emperor Rudolph in Vienna; he sent his Vicar General, Paulus Granutius, as his procurator. Bishop Giovanni Stefano Ferrero (1599–1610) was present at the Seventh Provincial Synod of Milan in May 1609 and subscribed the decrees.

=== Chapter and cathedral ===
Local tradition has it that the site of the later cathedral of S. Eusebio was the location of a temple of Vesta. Eusebius himself built a church dedicated to S. Theoneste on the site, which was destroyed by the barbarians, and rebuilt by Bishop Albinus in the mid-5th century. An alternate version, preserved by Benzo of Alba Pompeia, indicates that the church was founded by the Emperor Theodosius the Great (379–395). A third report indicates that the Basilica of S. Maria Major was founded by Constantine the Great (306–337), and that it was the original cathedral. The canons of the two institutions fought for hundreds of years over the right to elect a new bishop, precedence, privileges, and income.

At some point between 1132 and 1143, Pope Innocent II ordered Bishop Gisulf of Vercelli and Bishop Litifredus of Novara to settle the controversy between the canons of S. Eusebio and the canons of S. Maria Maggiore over the tithe and offerings. In 1144, Cardinals Guido of S. Crisogono and Hubaldus of S. Prassede, the papal legates, issued a decision concerning the complaints of the two Chapters of canons; Pope Eugenius III confirmed their judgment on 17 April 1146, and awarded the canons of S. Maria Maggiore a quarter of the district of Carisiana, with a command that the canons of S. Eusebio keep permanently silent on the matter. In 1175, the two sets of canons reached an agreement on various specific articles concerning the income, expenditure, possessions, rights, and holdings, which were the subject of dispute; the agreement was confirmed by Cardinal Guglielmo of S. Pietro ad vincula.

OLn 8 September 1175, Cardinal Guglielmo issued an order regulating the number of canons. In S. Eusebio, there were to be no more than thirty-two canons; in S. Maria Maggiore, eight. This arrangement was confirmed by a bull of Pope Innocent III, of 1 March 1208. The Chapter was headed by four dignities: the Archdeacon, the Archpriest, the Provost, and the Cantor Major. In his synodal constitutions of 10 November 1288, Bishop Aimo de Challant acknowledged that the colleges of canons of S. Eusebio and of S. Maria Maggiore together constituted the "Capitulum Vercellensem".

The competition and controversy was finally settled on 12 August 1644, when Bishop Giacomo Goria suppressed the Chapter of S. Maria Maggiore and combined all the canons in one body at S. Eusebio. The action was confirmed by a bull of Pope Innocent X of 26 December 1644.

=== Synods ===
A diocesan synod was an irregularly held, but important, meeting of the bishop of a diocese and his clergy. Its purpose was (1) to proclaim generally the various decrees already issued by the bishop; (2) to discuss and ratify measures on which the bishop chose to consult with his clergy; (3) to publish statutes and decrees of the diocesan synod, of the provincial synod, and of the Holy See.

The earliest known synod of the diocese of Vercelli was held by Bishop Atto (924–958), who issued "Constitutions", which envisioned annual meetings in synod. Bishop Ingo published a synodical constitution in 974. Bishop Ardericus held a synod in 1027. Bishop Alberto Avogadro presided over a synod in 1191. Bishop Aimone de Challant held a diocesan synod in November 1288.

Bishop Ibleto Fieschi (1412–1437) held a synod on 27 July 1428, the first in more than fifty years. Bishop Guglielmo Didier (1437–1452) held synods in 1440 and in 1451 or 1452, after which he imposed a tax on the clergy to rebuild the episcopal palace. Bishop Amadeo Nori (1459–1469) presided over a synod in 1461. Cardinal Giovanni Stefano Ferrero (1499–1502) held a synod in 1499.

Bishop Agostino Ferrero (1511 – 1536) presided over a diocesan synod in 1517, and issued constitutions. Bishop Francesco Bonomo held annual synods, beginning in 1573; he held his fourth diocesan synod in 1576, his fifth in 1578, and his sixth in 1579; his eleventh took place in 1584.

In 1600, Bishop Giovanni Stefano Ferrero (1599–1610) presided over a diocesan synod. Another was held in 1619 by Bishop Giacomo Goria. Four synods were held by Bishop Michelangelo Broglia, in 1666, 1670, 1673, and 1677. Bishop Giuseppe Bertodano held a synod in 1700.

On 15–17 July 1749, Bishop Giovanni Pietro Solaro (1743–1768) held a diocesan synod. Bishop Vittorio Costa d'Arignano presided over a diocesan synod. Bishop Alessandro d'Agennes held a synod on 7–9 June 1842. Bishop Carlo Pampirio held a diocesan synod on 22–24 September 1903.

=== Biella ===
On 1 June 1772, Pope Clement XIV, at the request of King Charles Emmanuel III of Sardinia, created the new Diocese of Biella, on territories which were removed from the jurisdiction of the bishop of Vercelli. The territories which had been removed were returned to the diocese of Vercelli on 1 June 1803, when the Diocese of Biella was suppressed by Pope Pius VII. The bishop of Biella, Giambattista Canevesi, was named Bishop of Vercelli.

In a decree issued in Paris on 25 January 1805, Cardinal Giovanni Battista Caprara, the papal legate and archbishop of Milan, carried out a new circumscription of the Cisalpine dioceses. The suffragan diocese of Vercelli was detached from the metropolitan archbishopric of Milan, and transferred to the metropolitanate of Turin.

=== Metropolitan archdiocese ===
After the defeat, abdication, and exile of Napoleon, the Congress of Vienna agreed to the restoration of the Kingdom of Sardinia. King Victor Emmanuel I of Sardinia invited Pope Pius VII to restore the good order of the Church in his kingdom, which had been disrupted by the French occupation. On 17 July 1817, the pope issued the bull "Beati Petri", which began by establishing de novo the ten dioceses which had been suppressed under the French, and delimiting the extent of each in detail, including Vercelli and the restored Biella. In the same document, the pope also released the diocese of Vercelli from being a suffragan of the metropolitan of Turin, and elevated the diocese to the rank of metropolitan archdiocese. The new metropolitan archdiocese had as suffragans the dioceses of Alessandria, Biella, and Casale.

In a further adjustment of the ecclesiastical structure of Piedmont and Liguria, Pope Pius VII, on 26 September 1817, transferred the diocese of Novara from the metropolitanate of Milan, to the metropolitanate of Vercelli.

On 1 August 1874, the archdiocese of Vercelli lost territory to the Diocese of Casale Monferrato.

Pope John Paul II made a Papal visit to Vercelli in May 1998, during which he declared the priest Secondo Pollo (d. 1941) to be "Blessed".

== Bishops and archbishops ==
=== Bishops of Vercelli ===
==== to 1000 ====
- Eusebius of Vercelli (343 – 1 Aug 371 Died)
- Limenius (370–396)
- Honoratus (396)
- Discolius
- Justinianus (attested 451)
- Albinus (5th cent.)

...
[ ? Simplicianus]

- Maximianus
- Aemilianus (attested 502)
- Eusebius
- Constantius
- Flavianus (d. 541 or 556)

...
[Vedast]

- ? Tiberius
- Berardus (VI/VII cent.)
- Philosophus
- Bonosus
- Cirillo
- Damianus

...

- Celsus (638–665)

...

- Theodorus (attested 680)
- Magnentius
- Aemilianus (attested 707)

...

- Chrysanthus

...

- Ansericus (attested 827)
- Nottingus (attested 830)
- Norgaudus (844)

...
[Josephus] (879)

- Cospertus (attested 879)
- Liutuardus (880–899)
- Sebastianus (attested 900–901)
- ? Anselbertus (attested 901)
- Regenbertus (904–924)
- Atto of Vercelli, (924–950 or later)
- Ingo (c. 961–974, or later)
- Petrus of Vercelli (978–997)
- Raginfredus (attested 997)
- Adelbertus (attested 998)

==== 1000 to 1350 ====
- Leo (999–1026)
- Ardericus (c. 1027–1040)
- Gregorius (attested 1044–1077)

Wennericus

- Regengerus (attested 1080–1091)

[Liprandus de Blanderade] (attested 1094) Intrusus, never consecrated
[Baldricus de Canavexio] Intrusus, never consecrated
[GregoriusII de Verruga] (attested 1094–1096) Intrusus, never consecrated
[Sigefredus] (attested 1111–1117) Intrusus, never consecrated
[Ardicius de Bulgaro] (attested c. 1121) Intrusus, never consecrated

- Anselmo Avogadro (attested 1124–1127)
- Gisulfus II Avogadro (1132–1151)
- Uguccio (1151–1170)
- Guala Bondonni (1170–1182)
- Uberto Crivelli (Dec 1182 – 9 May 1185)
- Albert Avogadro (1185–1204)
- Lotharius (1205–1208)
- Aliprandus Visconti (1208–1213)
- Ugo di Sessa (1213–1235)
- Jacobus Carnerius (1235–1241)
- Martino Avogadro de Quaregna (1244–1268)

Sede vacante (1268–1273)

- Aimo de Challant (1273–1303)
- Rainerio Avogadro (1303–1310)
- Uberto Avogadro (1310–1326)
- Lombardo della Torre (1328–1343)
- Emmanuel Fieschi (1343–1347)

==== since 1350 ====
- Giovanni Fieschi (1349–1379) Roman Obedience
- Jacques de' Cavalli (1 June 1379 – ) Avignon Obedience
- Ludovico Fieschi (29 March 1382 – 31 Oct 1406) Roman Obedience
- Matteo Gisalberti (1406–1412) Roman Obedience
- Ibletus Fieschi (1412–1437)
- Guglielmo Didier (1437)
- Joannes de Gilliaco (1452–1455)
- Georgius de Gilliaco (1455–1458)
- Amadeus Nori (1459–1469)
- Urbano Boninvardo (1469–1499)
- Giovanni Stefano Ferrero (1499–1502 Resigned)
- Giuliano della Rovere (24 Jan 1502 – 1 Nov 1503)
- Giovanni Stefano Ferrero (1503 – 1509)
- Bonifacio Ferrero (1509 – 1511)
- Agostino Ferrero (1511 – 1536)
- Pier Francesco Ferrero (20 Dec 1536 – 2 March 1562 Resigned)

Auxiliary Bishop: Melchiore Cribelli, O.P. (20 February 1540 – ?)

- Guido Luca Ferrero (2 March 1562 – 17 Oct 1572 Resigned)
- Giovanni Francesco Bonomi (1572 – 1587)
- Costanzo de Sarnano (Torri), O.F.M. Conv. (1587 – 1589)
- Corrado Asinari (1589 – 1590)
- Marcantonio Visia (13 Aug 1590 – 1599 Resigned)
- Giovanni Stefano Ferrero, O. Cist. (29 March 1599 – 21 Sep 1610 Died)
- Giacomo Goria (17 Aug 1611 – 3 Jan 1648 Died)

Sede vacante (1648–1660)

- Girolamo della Rovere (5 May 1660 – 20 Jan 1662 Died)
- Michael Angelus Broglia (30 Jul 1663 – May 1679 Died)
- Victor Augustinus Ripa (27 Nov 1679 – 3 Nov 1691 Died)
- Giovanni Giuseppe Maria Orsini, C.R.L. (24 March 1692 – August 1694 Died)

Sede vacante (1694–1697)

- Giuseppe Antonio Bertodano (3 June 1697 – 4 May 1700 Died)

Sede vacante (1700–1727)

- Gerolamo Francesco Malpasciuto (30 July 1727 – 9 August 1728 Died)
- Carlo Vincenzo Maria Ferreri, O.P. (23 Dec 1729 – 9 Dec 1742 Died)
- Gian Pietro Solaro (15 July 1743 – Jan 1768)
- Vittorio Costa d'Arignano (11 Sep 1769 – 1778)
- Carlo Giuseppe Filippa della Martiniana (12 July 1779 – 1802)
- Giovanni Battista Canaveri, C.O. (1 Feb 1805 – 11 Jan 1811)

Sede vacante (1811–1817)

=== Archbishops of Vercelli ===
- Giuseppe Maria Grimaldi (1817 – 1830)

Sede vacante (1830–1832)

- Alessandro d’Angennes (24 February 1832 – 8 May 1869 Died)
- Celestino Matteo Fissore (27 October 1871 – 5 April 1889 Died)
- Lorenzo Carlo Pampirio, O.P. (24 May 1889 – 26 December 1904 Died)
- Teodoro Valfrè di Bonzo (27 March 1905 – 13 September 1916 Appointed, Apostolic Nuncio to Austria)
- Giovanni Gamberoni (22 March 1917 – 17 February 1929 Died)
- Giacomo Montanelli (17 February 1929 – 6 May 1944 Died), former Coadjutor Archbishop (1928.11.23 – 1929.02.17)
- Francesco Imberti (10 October 1945 – 5 September 1966 Retired)
  - Auxiliary Bishop: Giovanni Picco (15 November 1962 – 1967)
- Albino Mensa (12 October 1966 – 4 June 1991 Retired)
- Tarcisio Pietro Evasio Bertone, S.D.B. (4 June 1991 – 13 June 1995 Appointed, Secretary of the Congregation for the Doctrine of the Faith)
- Enrico Masseroni (10 February 1996 – 27 February 2014 Retired)
- Marco Arnolfo (27 Feb 2014 – present)

== Parishes ==
The 118 parishes are divided between the Lombard province of Pavia and the Piedmontese provinces of Alessandria, Biella, Novara and Vercelli.

== See also ==
- List of Catholic dioceses in Italy

== Sources ==
=== Episcopal lists ===
- Eubel, Conradus, ed. (1913). Hierarchia catholica (in Latin). Vol. I (second ed.). Münster: Libreria Regensbergiana.
- Eubel, Conradus, ed. (1914). Hierarchia catholica (in Latin). Vol. II (second ed.). Münster: Libreria Regensbergiana.
- Eubel, Conradus; Gulik, Guilelmus (1923). Hierarchia catholica (in Latin). Vol. III (second ed.). Münster: Libreria Regensbergiana.
- Gams, Pius Bonifatius (1873). Series episcoporum Ecclesiae catholicae: quotquot innotuerunt a beato Petro apostolo (in Latin). Ratisbon: Typis et Sumptibus Georgii Josephi Manz. pp. 825–826.
- Gauchat, Patritius (Patrice) (1935). Hierarchia catholica (in Latin). Vol. IV (1592-1667). Münster: Libraria Regensbergiana.
- Ritzler, Remigius; Sefrin, Pirminus (1952). Hierarchia catholica medii et recentis aevi (in Latin). Vol. V (1667-1730). Patavii: Messagero di S. Antonio.
- Ritzler, Remigius; Sefrin, Pirminus (1958). Hierarchia catholica medii et recentis aevi (in Latin). Vol. VI (1730-1799). Patavii: Messagero di S. Antonio.
- Ritzler, Remigius; Sefrin, Pirminus (1968). Hierarchia Catholica medii et recentioris aevi (in Latin). Vol. VII (1800–1846). Monasterii: Libreria Regensburgiana.
- Remigius Ritzler; Pirminus Sefrin (1978). Hierarchia catholica Medii et recentioris aevi (in Latin). Vol. VIII (1846–1903). Il Messaggero di S. Antonio.
- Pięta, Zenon (2002). Hierarchia catholica medii et recentioris aevi (in Latin). Vol. IX (1903–1922). Padua: Messagero di San Antonio. ISBN 978-88-250-1000-8.

=== Studies ===
- Arnaldi, Domenico. Le carte dello Archivio arcivescovile di Vercelli. (in Italian and Latin). Pinerolo: tip. sucessori Brignoli, 1917
- Cappelletti, Giuseppe (1858). Le chiese d'Italia: dalla loro origine sino ai nostri giorni (in Italian). Vol. decimoquarto (XIV). Venice: G. Antonelli. pp. 355–429.
- Ferraris, G. (1963). "La vita commune nelle canoniche di S. Eusebio e di S. Maria di Vercelli nel secolo XII," (in Italian), in: Rivista di storia della Chiesa in Italia 17 (1963) pp. 365–394.
- Frankfurth, Hermann (1898). Gregorius de Montelongo: ein Beitrag zur Geschichte Oberitaliens in den Jahren 1238-1269. (in German). Marburg: R. Friedrich, 1898.
- Gabotto, Ferdinando (1896). "Biella e i vescovi di Vercelli: Ricerche," (in Italian), in: Archivio Storico Italiano, Serie V, Vol. 17, No. 202 (1896), pp. 279–340; Vol. 18, No. 203 (1896), pp. 3–57.
- Gabotto, Ferdinando (1898). "Intorno ai diplomi regi ed imperiali per la Chiesa di Vercelli," (in Italian), in: Archivio Storico Italiano, Serie V, Vol. 21, No. 209 (1898), pp. 1–53.
- Kehr, Paul Fridolin (1914). Italia pontificia : sive, Repertorium privilegiorum et litterarum a romanis pontificibus ante annum 1598 Italiae ecclesiis, monasteriis, civitatibus singulisque personis concessorum. (in Latin) Vol. VI. pars ii. Berolini: Weidmann. pp. 7–57.
- Lanzoni, Francesco (1927). Le diocesi d'Italia dalle origini al principio del secolo VII (an. 604). Faenza: F. Lega. (in Italian)
- Marchetti-Longi, Giuseppe (1913), "La legazione in Lombardia di Gregorio da Monte Longo negli anni 1238–1251," (in Italian), in: Archivio della R. Società romana di storia patria 36 (1913), pp. 225–285; 585–687.
- Orsenigo, Riccardo (1909). Vercelli sacra: brevissimi cenni sulla Diocesi e sue Parrocchie. (in Italian). Como: Ferrari 1909.
- Panero, Francesco (2004). Una signoria vescovile nel cuore dell'Impero. Funzioni pubbliche, diritti signorili e proprietà della Chiesa di Vercelli dall'età tardocarolingia all'età sveva. (in Italian) Vercelli: Società storica vercellese 2004.
- Savio, Fedele (1898). Gli antichi Vescovi d'Italia: il Piemonte (in Italian). Torino: Bocca. pp. 403–494.
- Schwartz, Gerhard (1907). Die Besetzung der Bistümer Reichsitaliens unter den sächsischen und salischen Kaisern: mit den Listen der Bischöfe, 951-1122. (in German). Leipzig: B.G. Teubner. pp. 134–141.
- Ughelli, Ferdinando; Coleti, Niccolo (1719). Italia sacra sive de Episcopis Italiae (in Latin). Vol. quartus (IV) (secunda ed.). Apud Sebastianum Coleti. pp. 744–815.

==== External links ====
- GCatholic, with Google map - data for all sections
