= Atto of Vercelli =

Most Reverend Atto of Vercelli
- Bishop of Vercelli
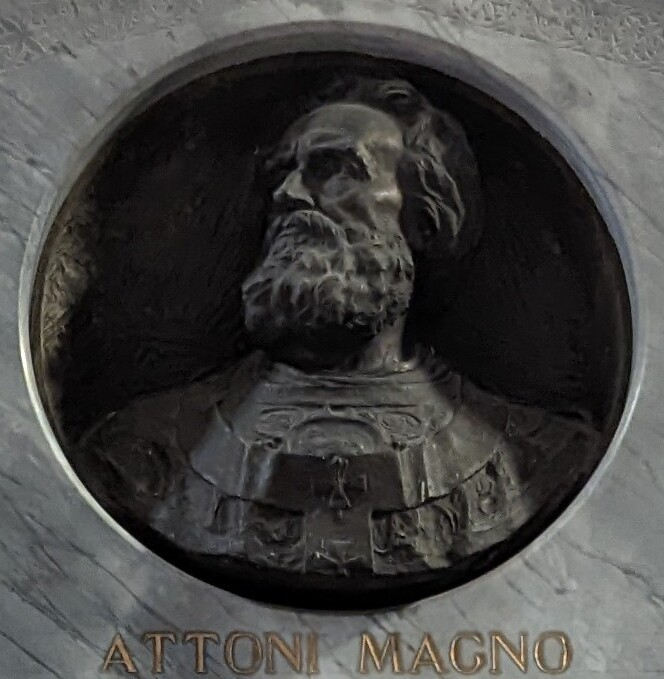
- Bust of Atto in Vercelli Cathedral
- Church: Catholic Church
- Diocese: Diocese of Vercelli

Personal details
- Born: c. 885 Milan, Kingdom of Italy
- Died: 31 December 961 (aged 76) Vercelli, Kingdom of Italy

Atto of Vercelli or Atto II (c. 885 – 31 December 961) was a Lombard who became bishop of Vercelli in 924. He served as Grand Chancellor to Hugh of Provence and Lothar II, both Kings of Italy in the 10th century. During his time as bishop, Atto was known for his devotion to the welfare of the people in his diocese, both temporal and spiritual, and the vigour with which he attacked ecclesial corruption. He wrote several works in his lifetime. His major compositions include Polypticum, a treatise on the morality of Italy in the day; De pressuris ecclesiasticis, an essay regarding ecclesiastical authority; and the Capitulare, a collection of canon law from his area, including some of the False Decretals, augmented by his own additions of ecclesiastic law. A small selection of his sermons survives in written form. He died in 961.

== Early life ==
Atto was born around 885 and lived approximately seventy-five years, dying on 31 December 961. He was born into a noble Lombard family; his father was a man named Aldegarius. Atto's writing later in life shows a mastery of Latin and Greek – Latin being the only common language in Italy by the 9th Century – which indicates that his education must have been substantial, in line with the social standing of his family. Little else is known about Atto's childhood or ecclesiastic career beginnings.

== Episcopate of Vercelli ==
Atto's rise to become bishop of Vercelli was the consequence of a violent attack on the city of Pavia. The invading army was Hungarian in origin. In 924, forces entered Italy, descending upon Pavia on 12 March. Ragembert, Atto's predecessor as bishop of Vercelli, was in Pavia at the time and perished in the event. This left the bishopric of Vercelli open for Atto, who must have been a prominent member of the clergy in Vercelli already to be eligible for the position. The episcopate put Atto in contact with many powerful men, including Hugh of Provence, King of Italy; Lothar II, King of Italy and Hugh's son; and the margrave Berengar II. He served as Grand Chancellor to both Hugh of Provence and Lothar II during their respective reigns over the Kingdom of Italy. His position with Lothar II began in May of 950. Atto did not agree with Lothar's unjust means of ruling, but was unsuccessful in making any real changes, as he could only council the young king.

== Religious Zeal and Church Corruption ==
Atto was highly concerned with the welfare of the people in his diocese, both spiritual and secular. He disapproved of the use of horoscopes to direct life choices such as marriage. He did not, however, prohibit the use of astrology in his flock completely, as he said that God created stars for the use of man. As a result, he encouraged the practical application of astrology as a method of telling time, navigating, and predicting the weather, for the benefit of his people who relied upon astrological calculations for their livelihoods. He worried extensively about the corruption of his flock: in an Easter sermon, he discredited public entertainment such as plays, particularly during the weeks of Lent and Easter. He claimed public entertainment was fabricated by the infamous “demons” Liber and Venus as a device to incite depravity.

His spiritual zeal was more famously directed toward the church itself. Atto was concerned with the clergy in Northern Italy. Although he noticed pagan superstitions in his parishioners, he believed these superstitions to be the fault of the clergy, who were “clearly not particularly devoted to their priestly duties. He readily prescribed punishment for priests who were misleading or neglecting their flocks. Atto also wished to rectify the growing problem of sexuality within the priesthood. He had discovered that many clerics, who were, by the decree of the Council of Nicaea, supposed to be celibate, were fornicating with women. Such clerics often made excuses as to why they needed women around, but Atto saw through these. Although he didn’t threaten any punishment to the offending ecclesiastics, he did strongly suggest that they should stop. More likely than not, his influence was not very strong on matters that were so tied to human nature, such as this.

Atto opposed several other practices within the Church. In the early Middle Ages, it was profitable for clergymen to sell holy cloth, i.e. altar furnishings or priest’s clothing, to families who wished to carry their dead to the grave with a liturgical article for the purpose of ensuring the dead a safe trip into the afterlife. Atto did not disapprove of this due to the actual ‘selling’ of holy articles, however. It was said that once restored to its original purpose, the cloth used to bear the dead would be tainted and pollute the altar and Mass it was meant to serve. Atto thus saw the appropriation of holy cloth during funeral services as a fault of the clergy: in his opinion, the ecclesiastics who performed this practice were unaware of the appropriate way to treat articles that are instrumental in sacred worship.

In the centuries before Atto's time, clerics from the lowest to the highest ranks were known to take counsel from magicians, or seers. This practice – and the general fear that clergymen were corrupted by or becoming magicians – died out in the middle of the 9th Century. Atto inexplicably decided to warn against the consultation of magicians and seers in all ranks of the clergy during his time as Bishop of Vercelli, although there is little evidence that it was still widely regarded as a problem.

== Works ==
Atto of Vercelli's literary canon survives in partial form and is largely instructional. His sermons can be found in contemporary anthologies, such as Atto's “on Palm Sunday (Sermon VII)” in Ray C. Petry's No Uncertain Sound: Sermons that Shaped the Pulpit Tradition, published in 1948. Alongside his larger works, Atto also wrote The Exposition on the Epistles of Saint Paul, a commentary that would have been used to educate the clergymen of Vercelli. A small collection of Atto's Epistolae, or letters, has been preserved, probably compiled from the codices of Vercelli and the Vatican Library. This collection includes nine letters that Atto wrote, and two directed to Atto from other authors.

=== De pressuris ecclesiasticis ===
The earliest of his principal compositions, De pressuris ecclesiasticis was written around 940 AD. It is sometimes referred to by its full name, De pressuris eclesiasticis libellus, meaning “Book on the Pressures of the Church.” It contains discourse regarding the jurisdiction of the Church and its law and argues against the maltreatment of laypeople. Alongside this, it disproves accusations against the clergy, including matters regarding the ordination of ecclesiastics, especially to the position of bishops, as well as the unwarranted expropriation of church property after a bishop's death.

=== Polypticum ===
Sometimes referred to as Perpendiculum, meaning “perpendicular,” “line,” or “plummet,” this work seems to have been completed near the end of Atto's life, perhaps in his last months. It may have been sent to a friend or colleague of Atto's, who wrote the foreword using Latin similar to that of Atto, before being published. It has been suggested that only the first two drafts of the work are in the hand of Atto himself, and that the aforementioned friend or colleague of Atto may have forged his hand for the later edition of the text. The work itself discusses the troubling political atmosphere of the Kingdom of Italy, albeit in an obscure way. It satirizes the political struggles between princes and nobility in the time period, and shows Atto's distaste and pessimism about the age in which he lived.

=== Canones: Ecclesiastic Law ===
The name of Atto's compilation of canon law is debatable. Linda Fowler-Magerl calls it the long-winded Capitula canonum excerptarum de diversis conciliis decretalibus statutis atque epistolis congruentium ad forense iudicium tempore domini Attonis episcopi, which translates roughly to “Excerpt chapters of canons about the different decretal statute councils and the corresponding letters to the legal judgment in the time of the lord Bishop Atto.” W. C. Korfmacher uses the shortened Canones statutaque Vercellensis Ecclesiae, roughly meaning “Canons and Statutes of the Church of Vercelli.” Paul Collins prefers the abbreviated Capitulare, simply meaning “capitulary.” It is clear in their writing, however, that Collins, Korfmacher, and Fowler-Magerl reference the same work, namely Atto's compilation of and additions to ecclesiastic law.

In this work, Atto assembled preexisting law from multiple resources: the decrees and letters of several popes, decrees from up to thirteen different councils, and the canon of Theodulf of Orléans. Portions of the decretals used are from a collection known as the False Decretals or Collectio Isidori Mercatoris. Some say that Atto's compilation deals exclusively with legislation in his diocese in Northern Italy.

The collection as a whole generally discusses legislation surrounding clerical discipline and lifestyle. For example, this set of canon law demands clerics to be very well versed in scripture and ecclesiastic law, including knowing the Apostles' Creed and the Nicene Creed verbatim. It requires clerics to be able to preach and celebrate Mass in Latin. It prohibits economic actions such as leasing property, acquiring interest on loans, and general business transactions. It also castigates those who renounce their faith for the worship of false idols, which Atto found to be a hazard to orthodoxy in his flock. As always, Atto devoted some of his efforts in canon law towards the greater good of his congregation: his collection included the requirement of clerics to bury their parishioners, and to be able to teach them both reading and writing.

== Sources ==
- Frugoni, Arsenio (1962). "ATTONE di Vercelli". Dizionario Biografico degli Italiani (in Italian). Vol. 4: Arconati–Bacaredda. Rome: Institute of the Italian Encyclopaedia. OCLC 883370.
- Boenig, Robert. Saint and Hero: Andreas and Medieval Doctrine. Lewisburg: Bucknell University Press, 1990.
- Collins, Paul. The Birth of the West: Rome, Germany, France, and the Creation of Europe in the Tenth Century. New York: PublicAffairs, 2013.
- Filotas, Bernadette. Pagan Survivals, Superstitions, and Popular Cultures in Early Medieval Pastoral Literature. Toronto: Pontifical Institute of Mediaeval Studies, 2005.
- Fowler-Magerl, Linda. Clavis Canonum: Selected Canon Law Collections Before 1140. Hanover: Hahnsche, 2005.
- Korfmacher, W. C. "Atto of Vercelli." In New Catholic Encyclopedia. Vol. 1. New York: McGraw-Hill, 1967.
- Petry, Ray C, ed. No Uncertain Sound: Sermons that Shaped the Pulpit Tradition. Philadelphia: Westminster Press, 1948.
- Valtorta, Benedetta. Clavis Scriptorum Latinorum Medii Aevi. Auctores Italiae (700-1000). Florence: SISMEL - Edizioni del Galluzzo, 2006.
- Wemple, Suzanne F. “The Canonical Resources of Atto of Vercelli (926-960).” Traditio 26 (1970): 335-350.
- Willhauck, George Alan. “The Letters of Atto, Bishop of Vercelli: Text, Translation, and Commentary.” Ph. D Dissertation, Tufts University, 1984.
- Zeigler, A.K. “Medieval Literature.” In New Catholic Encyclopedia. Vol. 9. New York: McGraw-Hill, 1967.
