= Santa Maria Maggiore, Racconigi =

Catholic church in Cuneo province, Italy

Coordinates: 44°46′0.1″N 7°40′45.5″E

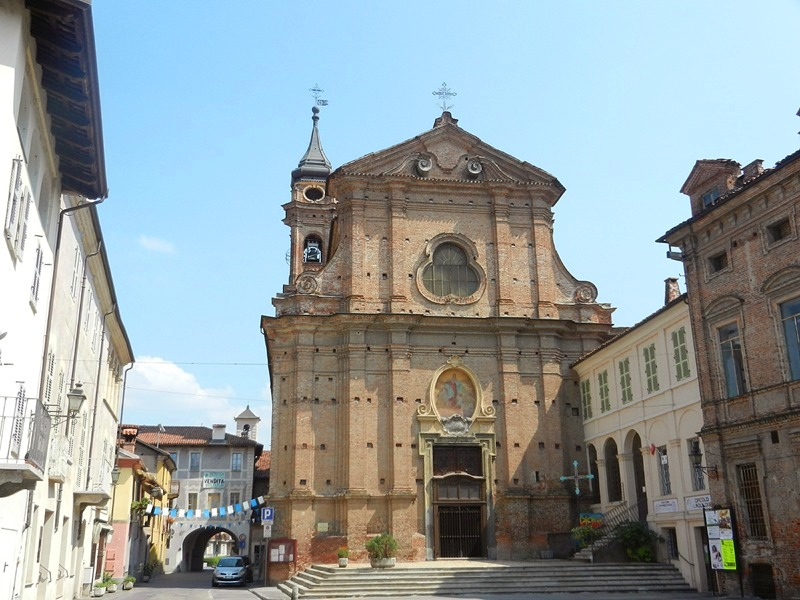
2385RacconigiSMariaMaggiore

Santa Maria Maggiore is a Roman Catholic church in Racconigi, Province of Cuneo, region of Piedmont, Italy.

== History ==
In 1725–27, a church at the site was rebuilt by the parish, utilizing designs by Carlo Castelli with possible contribution of Bernardo Antonio Vittone to the decoration. The brick facade is notable for an oval fresco over the portal depicting the Madonna of the Assumption. The interior ceiling was frescoed by Paolo Emilio Morgari; there are eight lateral chapels. The fourth on the right has an Altarpiece depicting Souls in Purgatory by Vittorio Blanchery, a pupil of Beaumont. The main altar is built of polychrome marble and the apse contains wooden choir stalls. The main altarpiece is an Assumption of the Virgin (1762) by Claudio Francesco Beaumont.
