= Nino Costa (poet) =

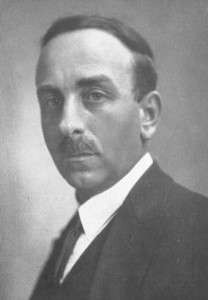
Portrait of the Piedmontese poet Nino Costa.

Giovanni Costa, better known by the pseudonym Nino Costa (Turin, 28 June 1886 – Turin, 5 November 1945), was an Italian poet and writer, widely considered the most representative figure of 20th-century Piedmontese literature.

== Biography ==
Born in Turin to a family with roots in Cirié and the Canavese region, he attended the Liceo classico Cavour before earning degrees in Literature and Veterinary Medicine from the University of Turin. Despite his academic background, he spent his professional life as an employee of the Cassa di Risparmio di Torino.

Costa began his literary career writing for the weekly magazine Birichin under the pseudonym Mamina. Starting in 1922, he published several collections of poetry in the Piedmontese language that elevated the language to a high lyrical standard, moving away from purely folkloric themes to explore universal existential concerns.

His later years were marked by tragedy; in 1944, his nineteen-year-old son Mario, a partisan, was killed during a military action in Val Chisone. Costa died in Turin a year later, in November 1945. His final collection, Tempesta ("Storm"), published posthumously in 1946, reflects the sorrow of his personal loss and the devastation of World War II.

== Legacy ==
Costa is commemorated with a monument in Turin's Valentino Park and a plaque on the house where he lived in the Crocetta district. Several schools and streets in the Metropolitan City of Turin are named in his honor.

== See also ==
- Piedmontese literature
- Piedmontese language
