= Monasterolo di Savigliano =

- Comune
- Comune di Monasterolo di Savigliano
- Coat of arms

- Location within Italy Location within Piedmont
- Coordinates: 44°41′N 7°37′E
- Country: Italy
- Region: Piedmont
- Province: Province of Cuneo (CN)
- Frazioni: Case Nuove

Government
  - Mayor: Giorgio Alberione

Area
  - Total: 14.91 km^{2} (5.76 sq mi)

Population (1-1-2021)
  - Total: 1,364
  - Density: 91.48/km^{2} (236.9/sq mi)
- Demonym: Monasterolese(i)
- Time zone: UTC+1 (CET)
  - Summer (DST): UTC+2 (CEST)
- Postal code: 12030
- Dialing code: 0172

Monasterolo di Savigliano is a comune (municipality) in the Province of Cuneo in the Italian Piedmont region, and is located about 45 kilometres (28 mi) south of Turin and about 35 kilometres (22 mi) north of Cuneo. As of January 2017, it had a population of 1,373 and an area of 14.91 square kilometres (5.76 mi^{2}).

Monasterolo di Savigliano borders the following municipalities: Cavallermaggiore, Ruffia, Savigliano, and Scarnafigi.

The town originated from a castle built here by Thomas I of Saluzzo in 1242.

== Demographic evolution ==
Historical population

Year	Pop.	±%
1861	1,413	—
1871	1,354	−4.2%
1881	1,572	+16.1%
1901	1,509	−4.0%
1911	1,550	+2.7%

Year	Pop.	±%
1921	1,521	−1.9%
1931	1,522	+0.1%
1936	1,474	−3.2%
1951	1,385	−6.0%
1961	1,185	−14.4%

Year	Pop.	±%
1971	1,153	−2.7%
1981	1,133	−1.7%
1991	1,142	+0.8%
2001	1,173	+2.7%

Source: Data from ISTAT
