= Villanova Solaro =

- Comune
- Comune di Villanova Solaro
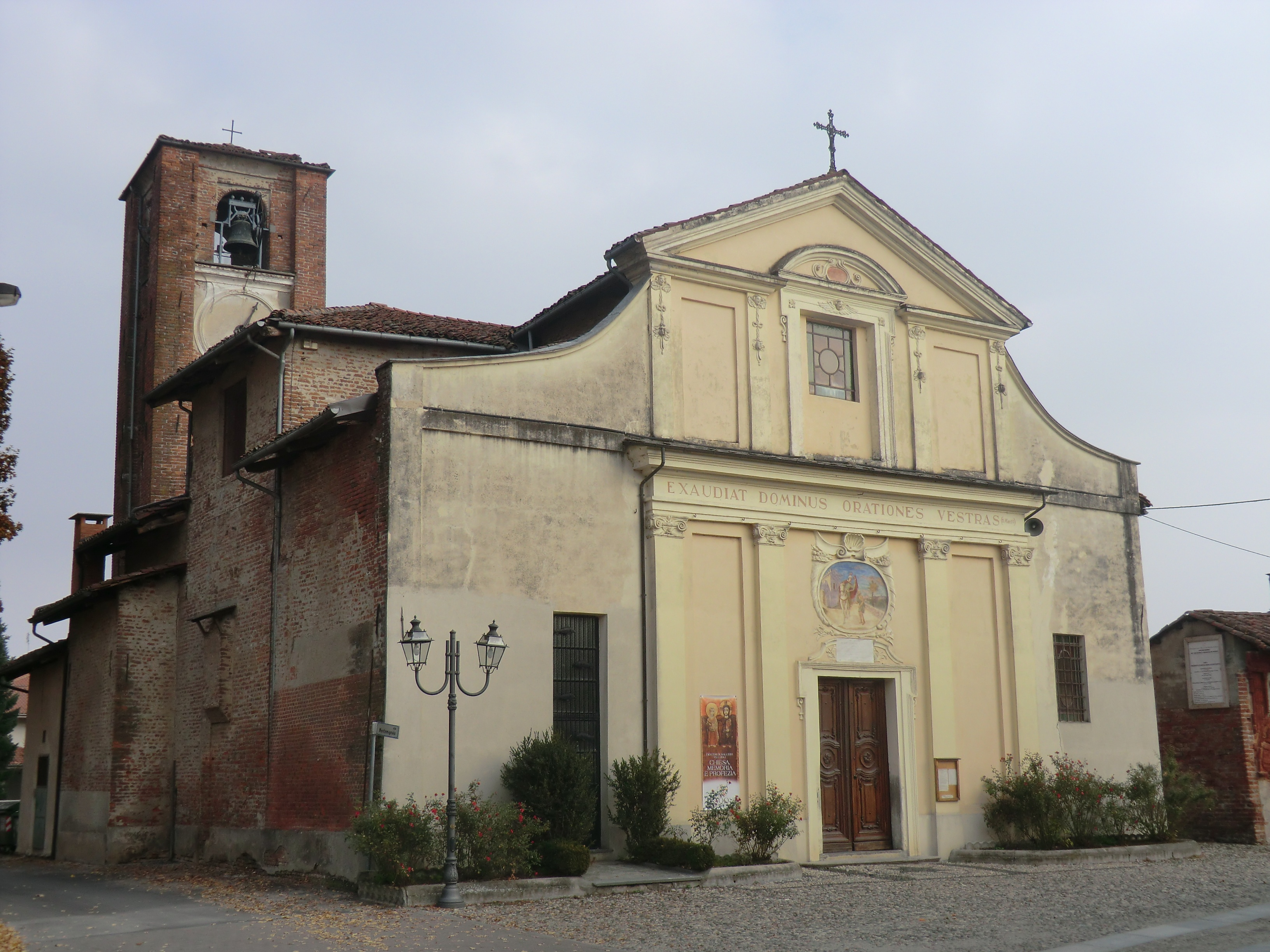
- Church of San Martino.

- Location within Italy Location within Piedmont
- Coordinates: 44°44′N 7°35′E
- Country: Italy
- Region: Piedmont
- Province: Cuneo (CN)
- Frazioni: Vernetto, Airali

Government
  - Mayor: Alberto Simone

Area
  - Total: 14.8 km^{2} (5.7 sq mi)
- Elevation: 268 m (879 ft)

Population (Dec. 2004)
  - Total: 788
  - Density: 53.2/km^{2} (138/sq mi)
- Demonym: Villanovesi
- Time zone: UTC+1 (CET)
  - Summer (DST): UTC+2 (CEST)
- Postal code: 12030
- Dialing code: 0172
- Website: Official website

Villanova Solaro is a comune (municipality) in the Province of Cuneo in the Italian region Piedmont, located about 40 kilometres (25 mi) south of Turin and about 40 kilometres (25 mi) north of Cuneo. As of 31 December 2004, it had a population of 788 and an area of 14.8 square kilometres (5.7 mi^{2}).

The municipality of Villanova Solaro contains the frazioni (subdivisions, mainly villages and hamlets) Vernetto and Airali.

Villanova Solaro borders the following municipalities: Moretta, Murello, Ruffia, Scarnafigi, and Torre San Giorgio.

== Demographic evolution ==
Historical population

Year	Pop.	±%
1861	1,735	—
1871	1,732	−0.2%
1881	1,757	+1.4%
1901	1,531	−12.9%
1911	1,498	−2.2%

Year	Pop.	±%
1921	1,426	−4.8%
1931	1,538	+7.9%
1936	1,438	−6.5%
1951	1,382	−3.9%
1961	1,079	−21.9%

Year	Pop.	±%
1971	954	−11.6%
1981	910	−4.6%
1991	808	−11.2%
2001	782	−3.2%

Source: Data from ISTAT
