= Moretta =

- Comune
- Comune di Moretta
- Location within Italy Location within Piedmont
- Coordinates: 44°45′N 7°32′E
- Country: Italy
- Region: Piedmont
- Province: Province of Cuneo (CN)
- Frazioni: Brasse, Brasse Piccolo, Pasco, Piattera, Prese, Roncaglia, Tetti Varaita

Government
  - Mayor: Sergio Banchio (Civic list)

Area
  - Total: 23.99 km^{2} (9.26 sq mi)
- Elevation: 252 m (827 ft)

Population (January 1, 2017)
  - Total: 4,141
  - Density: 172.6/km^{2} (447.1/sq mi)
- Demonym: Morettese(i)
- Time zone: UTC+1 (CET)
  - Summer (DST): UTC+2 (CEST)
- Postal code: 12033
- Dialing code: 0172
- ISTAT code: 004143
- Website: Official website

Moretta is a comune (municipality) in the Province of Cuneo in the Italian region Piedmont, located about 35 kilometres (22 mi) southwest of Turin and about 40 kilometres (25 mi) north of Cuneo. As of January 1, 2017, it had a population of 4,141 and an area of 23.99 square kilometres (9.26 mi^{2}).

The municipality of Moretta contains the frazioni (subdivisions, mainly villages and hamlets) Boglio, Bogliotto, Brasse, Brasse Piccolo, Pasco, Piattera, Prese, Roncaglia, and Tetti Varaita.

Moretta borders the following municipalities: Cardè, Faule, Murello, Polonghera, Saluzzo, Torre San Giorgio, Villafranca Piemonte, and Villanova Solaro.

== Demographic evolution ==
Historical population

| Year | Pop. | ±% |
|---|---|---|
| 1861 | 3,464 | — |
| 1871 | 3,281 | −5.3% |
| 1881 | 3,270 | −0.3% |
| 1901 | 2,917 | −10.8% |
| 1911 | 3,021 | +3.6% |

| Year | Pop. | ±% |
|---|---|---|
| 1921 | 3,007 | −0.5% |
| 1931 | 2,896 | −3.7% |
| 1936 | 3,132 | +8.1% |
| 1951 | 3,276 | +4.6% |
| 1961 | 3,118 | −4.8% |

| Year | Pop. | ±% |
|---|---|---|
| 1971 | 3,457 | +10.9% |
| 1981 | 3,961 | +14.6% |
| 1991 | 4,017 | +1.4% |
| 2001 | 4,106 | +2.2% |

Source: Data from ISTAT
