= Cavallerleone =

- Comune
- Comune di Cavallerleone
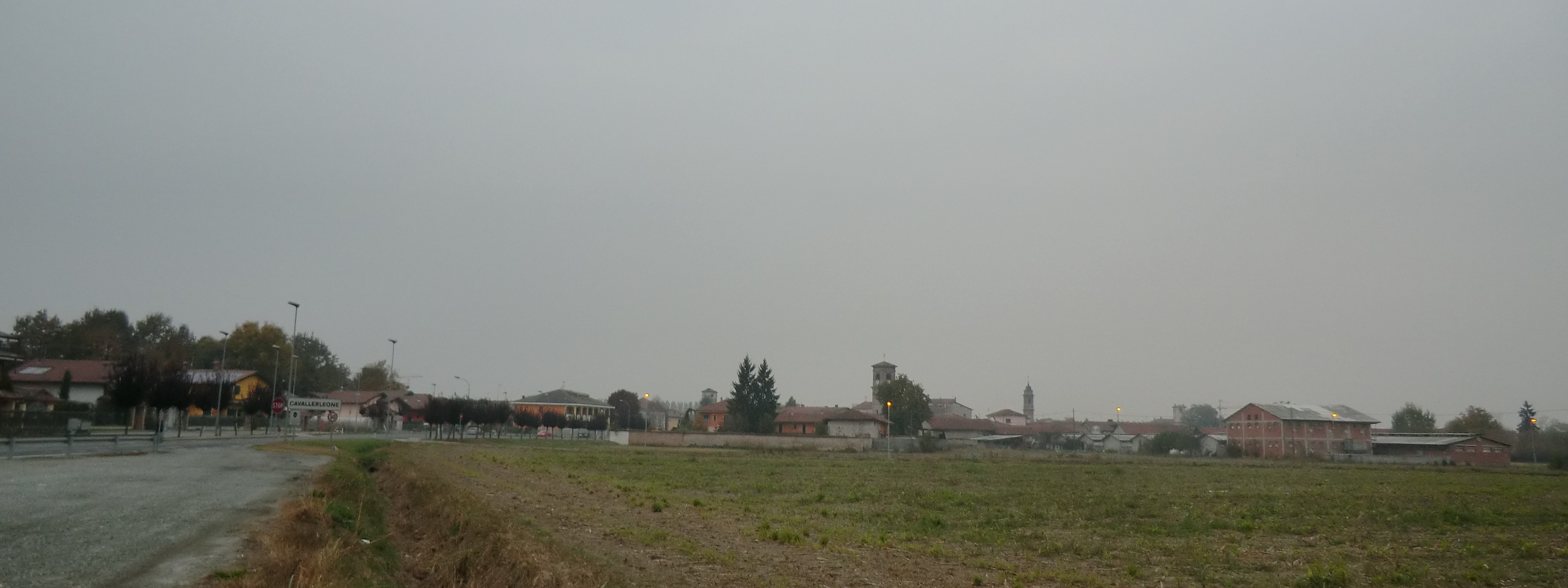

- Coat of arms

- Location within Italy Location within Piedmont
- Coordinates: 44°44′N 7°40′E
- Country: Italy
- Region: Piedmont
- Province: Cuneo (CN)
- Frazioni: Cascinassa, Pedaggera

Government
  - Mayor: Giovanni Bongiovanni

Area
  - Total: 16.44 km^{2} (6.35 sq mi)
- Elevation: 270 m (890 ft)

Population (30 November 2017)
  - Total: 644
  - Density: 39.2/km^{2} (101/sq mi)
- Demonym: Cavallerleonesi
- Time zone: UTC+1 (CET)
  - Summer (DST): UTC+2 (CEST)
- Postal code: 12030
- Dialing code: 0172
- Website: Official website

Cavallerleone is a comune (municipality) in the Province of Cuneo in the Italian region Piedmont, located about 35 kilometres (22 mi) south of Turin and about 40 kilometres (25 mi) north of Cuneo.

Cavallerleone borders the following municipalities: Cavallermaggiore, Murello, Racconigi, and Ruffia.
