= Stezzano =

- Comune
- Comune di Stezzano
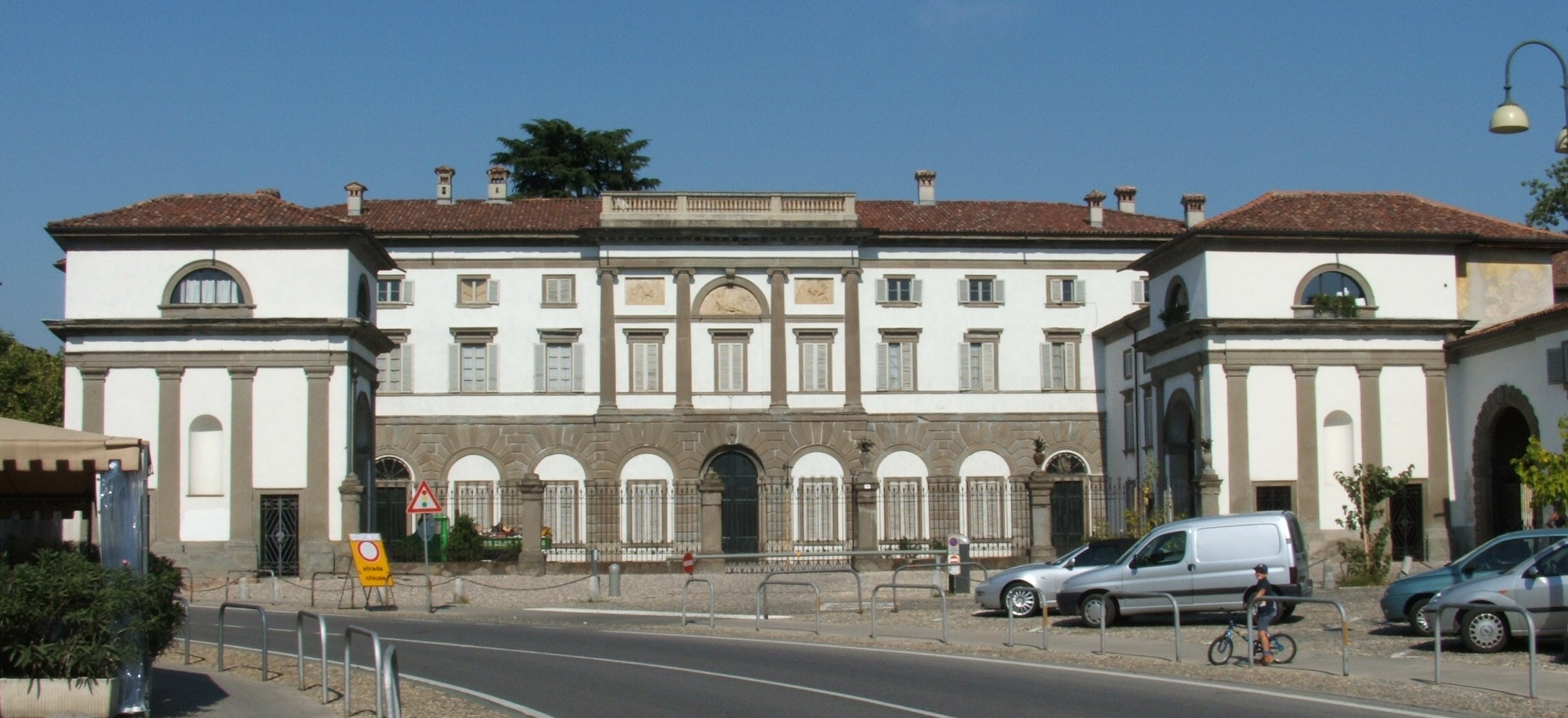
- Villa Moroni in Stezzano.

- Coat of arms

- Location within Italy Location within Lombardy
- Coordinates: 45°38′N 9°39′E
- Country: Italy
- Region: Lombardy
- Province: Bergamo (BG)

Government
  - Mayor: Simone Tangorra (Civic list (Italy))

Area
  - Total: 9.37 km^{2} (3.62 sq mi)
- Elevation: 211 m (692 ft)

Population (30 September 2025)
  - Total: 13,856
  - Density: 1,480/km^{2} (3,830/sq mi)
- Demonym: Stezzanesi
- Time zone: UTC+1 (CET)
  - Summer (DST): UTC+2 (CEST)
- Postal code: 24040
- Dialing code: 035
- Patron saint: St. John the Baptist
- Saint day: June 24
- Website: Official website

Stezzano (Bergamasque: Stezà) is a comune (municipality) in the Province of Bergamo in the Italian region of Lombardy, located about 40 kilometres (25 mi) northeast of Milan and about 8 kilometres (5 mi) south of Bergamo.

== Main sights ==
- Villa Moroni (17th century)
- Villa Caroli-Zanchi
- Villa Moroni
- Villa Maffeis
- Sanctuary of Madonna dei Campi
- Parish church of St. John the Baptist and St. Peter (17th-19th centuries)
- Via Roma 12

== People ==
- Tavo Burat, (1932–2009), journalist
