= Leo of Vercelli =

Leo (c.965–1026) was a German prelate who served as the Bishop of Vercelli from 999. Born in Hildesheim, he was made an archdeacon by 998 and was appointed to the see of Vercelli as the candidate of the Emperor Otto III and Pope Sylvester II following the assassination of Bishop Peter. He worked tirelessly for the extension of imperial authority in Italy during the reigns of Otto III, Henry II and Conrad II. He worked for the imperial chancery, receiving the high rank and title of logothete.

Only a few of Leo's writings have survived, and only one of his epistles. A notable Latin verse encomium written at Rome praises Otto III and Pope Gregory V. He also left behind an elegy of his diocesan predecessor and the so-called Metrum leonis, a sometimes-rhyming adonic poem with fabulous and personal elements.

The only complete copy of Cicero's Epistulae ad Familiares - a work of great importance to scholars of Roman history - is known to have been in the possession of Bishop Leo.
