= Cavallermaggiore =

- Comune
- Città di Cavallermaggiore
- Coat of arms

- Location within Italy Location within Piedmont
- Coordinates: 44°43′N 7°41′E
- Country: Italy
- Region: Piedmont
- Province: Cuneo (CN)
- Frazioni: Asalotti, Bertolini, Cascine Olmetto, Cascine Trebietta, Foresto, Madonna del Pilone, Mana, Motta Gastaldi, Prinotti, Riassuolo

Government
  - Mayor: Davide Sannazzaro (Civic List)

Area
  - Total: 51.6 km^{2} (19.9 sq mi)
- Elevation: 285 m (935 ft)

Population (1-1-2017)
  - Total: 5,484
  - Density: 106/km^{2} (275/sq mi)
- Demonym: Cavallermaggiorese(i)
- Time zone: UTC+1 (CET)
  - Summer (DST): UTC+2 (CEST)
- Postal code: 12030
- Dialing code: 0172
- Patron saint: St. George
- Saint day: April 23

Cavallermaggiore is a comune (municipality) in the Province of Cuneo in the Italian region Piedmont, located about 40 kilometres (25 mi) south of Turin and about 40 kilometres (25 mi) northeast of Cuneo.

Cavallermaggiore borders the following municipalities: Bra, Cavallerleone, Cherasco, Marene, Monasterolo di Savigliano, Racconigi, Ruffia, Sanfrè, Savigliano, and Sommariva del Bosco.
