= Tavo Burat =

Italian journalist and writer (1932–2009)

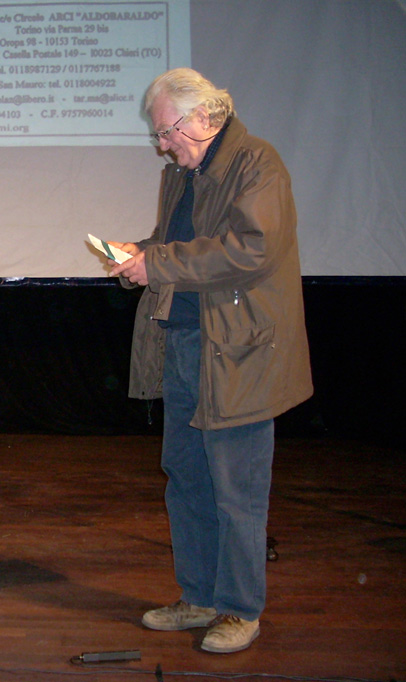
- Born: Gustavo Buratti Zanchi; 22 May 1932; Stezzano, Lombardy, Italy
- Died: 8 December 2009 (aged 77); Biella, Piemonte, Italy
- Occupations: Journalist, writer, ecologist, historian
- Known for: La Slòira, Centro Studi Fra Dolcino

Tavo Burat (born Gustavo Buratti Zanchi, 22 May 1932 – 8 December 2009) was an Italian Waldensian writer and journalist. Burat spent much of his life defending the Piedmontese language island. Beginning in 1964, Burat was the secretary of an international association that defends languages and cultures threatened with extinction. He specifically focused on defending Piedmontese and Franco-Provençal.

== Biography ==
Born in Stezzano in 1932, Burat graduated in law with a dissertation titled Right in Graubünden. He taught French at a middle school from 1968 to 1994.

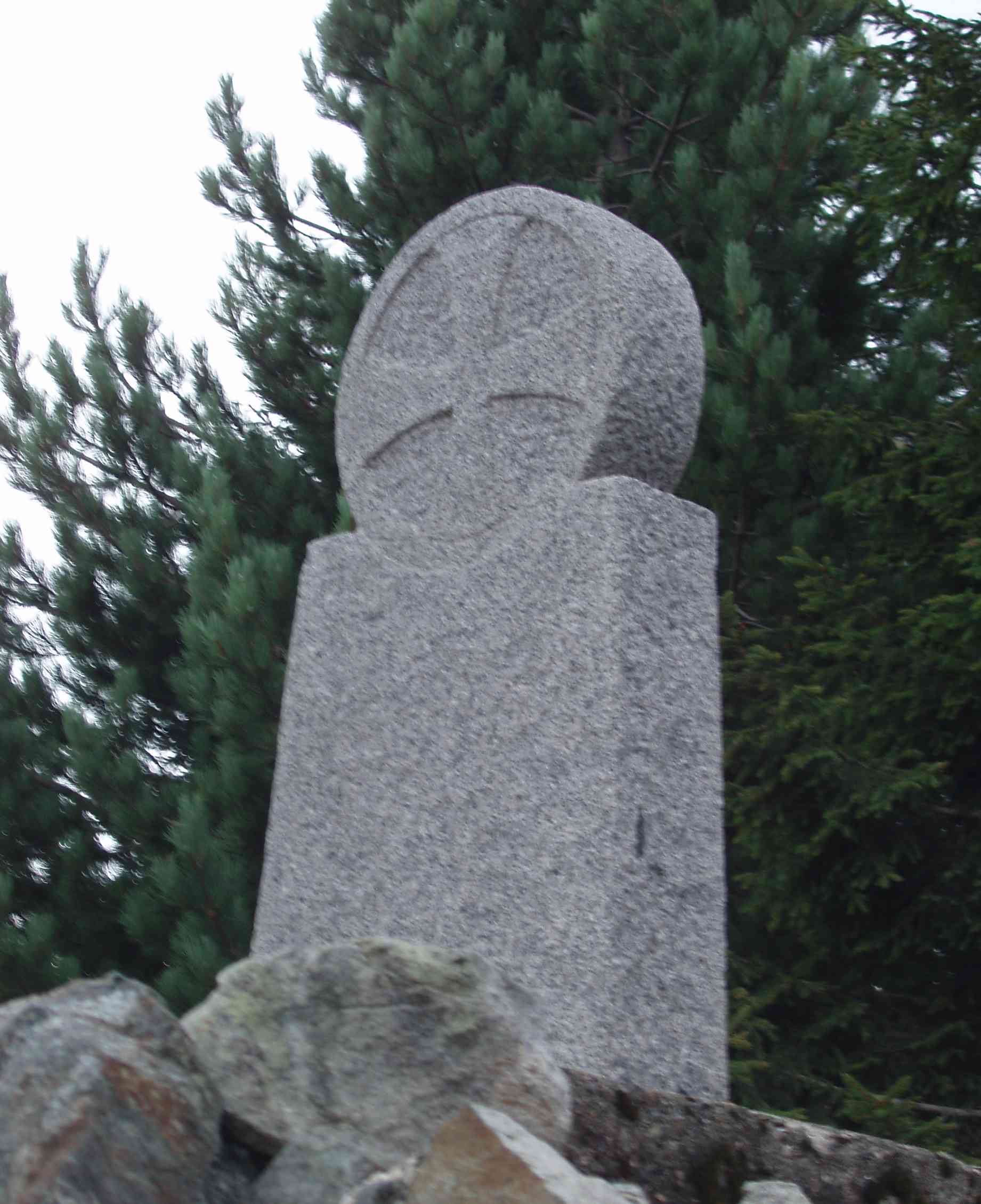
1974 Frà Dolcino memorial stone on Monte Rubello

He was the founder and first director of La slòira (in English literally The plough), one of the few magazines written in Piedmontese and widespread all around the region, and was as well an editor of the mountaineering review ALP from 1974 to 2009. He wrote several history essays, notably about brigandage in northwest Italy and the heresy led by Fra Dolcino. His research about Dolcino involved him not only at a scientific level but also ideally, and Burat considered himself as a neo-dolcinian. In 1974 on the summit of Monte Rubello (1,414 m), where in 1907 left-wing workers of Biella and the Sesia Valley erected a monument on the place of Fra Dolcino last resistance, he laid a new stone memorial. The first monument was symbolically gunned down in 1927 by the Fascists. The 1974 opening ceremony was attended by thousands of people and guided by the Italian Nobel prize Dario Fo.

Tavo Burat also pursued an active political career, at first in the Italian Socialist Party and later in the Verdi, focusing particularly on ecological issues. The Biella section of the voluntary association Legambiente is named Tavo Burat in order to celebrate his environmentalist legacy.

He died in 2009.

== Political and cultural career ==
- City council member in Biella from 1956 to 1994
- Regional manager for PSI from 1975 to 1984
- Assessor to Comunità montana Bassa Valle Elvo from 1970 to 1993
- Representative for the Greens for the revision of the Statute of the Region Piemonte
- National Councillor for the Greens from 2000 to 2009
- Coordinator of Centro studi dolciniani from 1974 to 2009
- Founder of the Consiglio federativo della Resistenza di Biella.

== Works ==
=== In Italian ===
- 1957: Diritto pubblico nel Cantone dei Grigioni (Milano-Varese, ed. Cisalpino-Goliardica, 1957).
- 1974: La situazione giuridica delle minoranze linguistiche in Italia, dins I diritti delle minoranze etnico-linguistiche (Milano, ed. Cisalpino-Goliardica, 1974).
- 1976: In difesa degli altri, dins U. Bernardi, Le mille culture, Comunità locali e partecipazione politica (Roma, ed. Coines, 1976).
- 1981: Decolonizzare le Alpi, dins Prospettive dell'arco alpino (Milano, ed. Jaca Book, 1981).
- 1989: Carlo Antonio Gastaldi. Un operaio biellese brigante dei Borboni (Milano, ed. Jaka Book, 1989).
- 1997: Federalismo e autonomie. Comunità e bioregioni (Torino, ed. Regione Piemonte, 1997).
- 2000: Fra Dolcino e gli Apostolici tra eresia, rivolta e roghi (Roma, ed. DeriveApprodi, 2000).
- 2002: L'anarchia cristiana di Fra Dolcino e Margherita (Biella, ed. Leone & Griffa, 2002)
- 2004: Eretici dimenticati. Dal Medioevo alla modernità (Roma, ed. DeriveApprodi, 2004)
- 2006: Banditi e ribelli dimenticati. Storie di irriducibili al futuro che viene (Milano, ed. Lampi di Stampa, 2006)

=== In Piedmontese ===
- 1979: Finagi (Ca dë studi piemontèis, 1979)
- 2005: Lassomse nen tajé la lenga (ALP, 2005)
- 2008: Poesìe (Ca dë studi piemontèis, 2008)
