= Theonestus of Vercelli =

Saint Theonestus of Vercelli
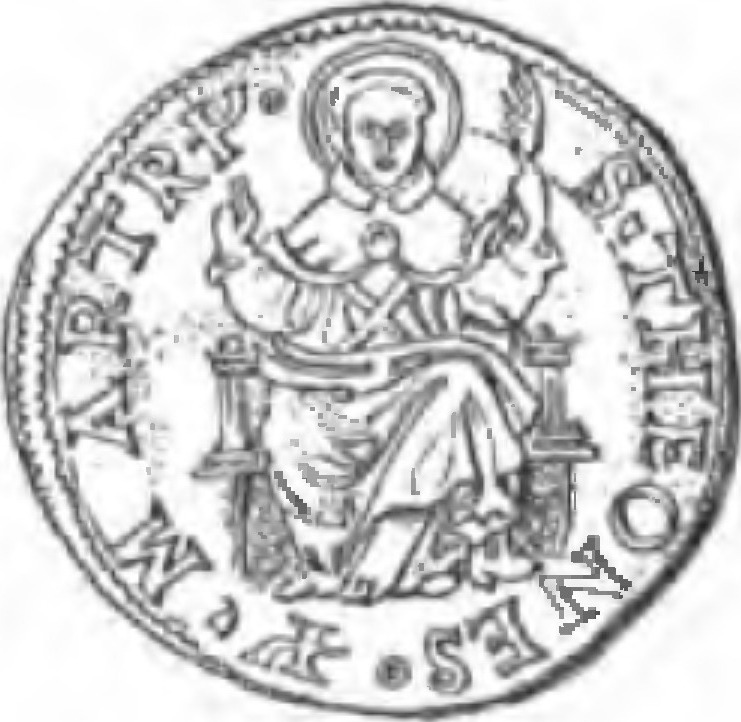

Martyr
- Died: uncertain, sometime before the 4th century
- Major shrine: Vercelli
- Feast: November 20
- Attributes: depicted as a soldier

Theonestus of Vercelli is venerated as a martyr and saint by the Catholic Church. Theonestus may have been a member of the early Christian community in Vercelli, living in an era earlier than that of Eusebius of Vercelli. Theonestus may have been a martyr, whose relics were buried in the cemetery where other Christians were buried, outside the city walls. It is believed that his whole body was conserved in the tomb dedicated to him. He is probably not the saint of the same name who was said to have been killed at Altinum by the Arians. This saint of Altinum, whose legend, in any case, is confused and contradictory, may have been confused for the martyr of Vercelli, whose historicity is more certain.

== Historicity ==
The only ancient source that mentions Theonestus is the Vita of Eusebius of Vercelli. This text records the fact that Eusebius (d. 371 AD) wished to be buried near the relics of Theonestus, which lay outside of the city walls of Vercelli. Eusebius dedicated a basilica he built to Theonestus, and was interred in it.

This text, however, was written in the 8th century, and thus its reliability as a source is doubtful; a basilica dedicated to Theonestus may have existed by the fourth century. When this basilica was progressively demolished in the 16th century, the sepulchers of Eusebius and Theonestus are purported to have been discovered. A cruciform inscription, now lost, read S. MARTIR THEONESTUS, and was judged to date from the 4th century.

== Veneration ==
Theonestus' relics are now situated in the cathedral of Vercelli, in a niche over the altar of the Madonna dello Schiaffo. His cultus was never particularly strong, and he was not depicted in art with frequency, and also never came to be associated with any particular patronage. However, as Damiano Pomi has written, "paradoxically the scarce and basic details concerning Theonestus, guarantee, rather than wild and unreliable legends, the authenticity of his cultus."
