= Catherine of Racconigi =

Italian member of the Third Order of Saint Dominic

Blessed Catherine of Racconigi TOSD
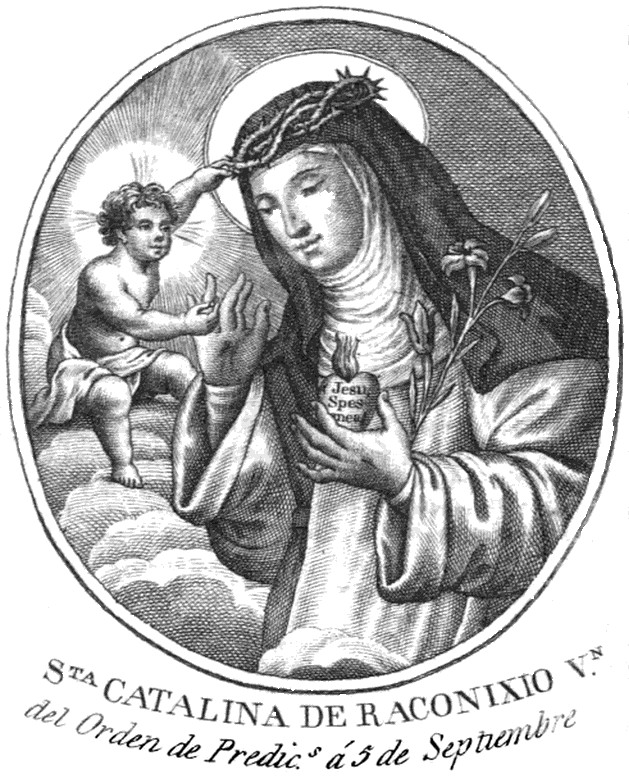
- Image of Blessed Catherine

Religious
- Born: 1486; Piedmont
- Died: 1547 (aged 60–61); Racconigi
- Venerated in: Catholic Church
- Beatified: 9 April 1808 by Pope Pius VII
- Feast: 4 September
- Attributes: Religious habit

Catherine of Racconigi (1486 – 1547, Racconigi) was an Italian member of the Third Order of St. Dominic, who is recognized for being a mystic and a stigmatic.

== Biography ==
Most of the information regarding Catherine Mattei is derived from a vita written by her friend, John Francis Pico, Prince of Mirandola. Catherine Mattei (Italian: Caterina Mattei) was born in the Piedmont region of Northwest Italy in 1487 into an impoverished household in the Province of Cuneo. Intermittent conflicts in the area brought widespread poverty. Her parents were Giorgio and Bilia de Ferrari Mattei. Her father was an unemployed tool-maker, while her mother was a weaver who was able to support the family. Her father was often despondent and quarrelsome, thus the family environment was usually one of conflict.

She is said to have had, at about the age of nine, a vision of Jesus, who appeared to her as a boy of about ten. She would also begin to have visions of other saints such as the Dominicans Catherine of Siena and Peter Martyr. The Virgin told her that Jesus wanted to have her as his bride, as a token of which she was given a wedding ring, which she had all her life—but which only she could see. She began to have frequent ecstasies and visions of Jesus, who always appeared to her as the same age she was at the time of the vision.

Many miracles would result from her visions: a broken dish was made whole again, and money and food would be provided when the family's poverty was extreme. In times of trial she received great consolation from the aspiration, "Jesus, is my only hope!"

Catherine eventually joined the Dominican Order herself, but, like Catherine of Siena, she was opposed in this wish by her family. As a result, instead of entering a monastery of the cloistered nuns of the Order, she became a tertiary of the Order, continuing to live with her family. As the visions increased she received the stigmata, although, the wounds were not visible until after her death.

Her mystical experiences roused a storm of gossip among her neighbors, who were terrified at the lights and sounds that came from her home; even the Dominican friars began to ostracize her. Eventually she was forced out of the town and settled in the city of Racconigi. During her lifetime, Catherine was sought for counsel and prayer. She would keep in her prayers in a special way the salvation of soldiers who were dying in battle.

== Veneration ==
Many miracles took place before and after her death and her detractors came to acknowledge the holiness of her life. She was beatified on 9 April 1808 by Pope Pius VII.
