= Vercelli Cathedral =

Church in Vercelli, Piedmont, Italy

Cathedral of Saint Eusebius Cattedrale di Sant'Eusebio
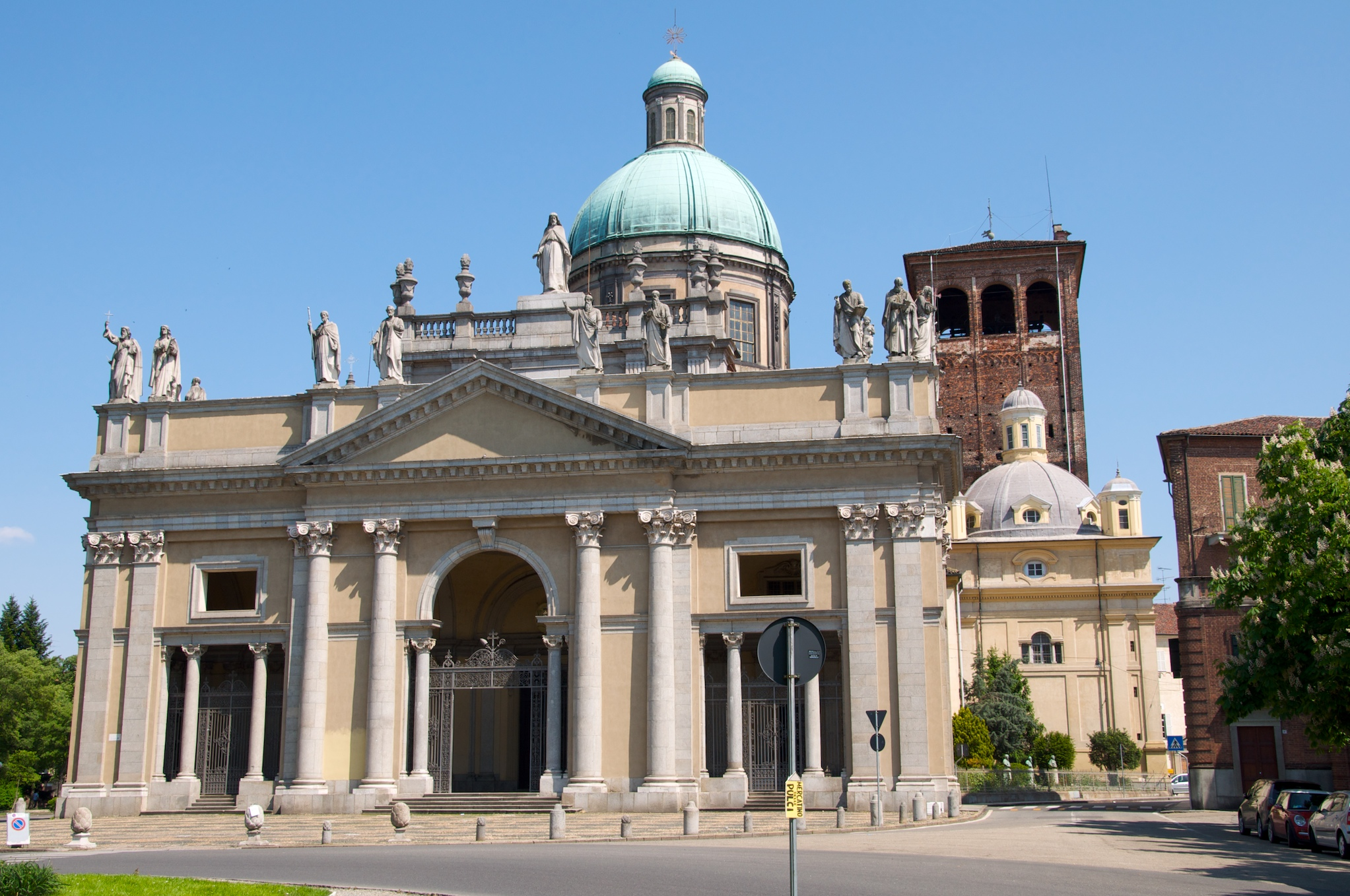
- West front of Vercelli Cathedral on the Piazza Sant'Eusebio

Religion
- Affiliation: Roman Catholic
- Province: Archdiocese of Vercelli
- Ecclesiastical or organisational status: Cathedral

Location
- Location: Vercelli, Italy
- Interactive map of Cathedral of Saint Eusebius; Cattedrale di Sant'Eusebio
- Coordinates: 45°19′48.68″N 8°25′20.89″E

Architecture
- Type: Church
- Groundbreaking: 16th century

Vercelli Cathedral (Italian: Duomo di Vercelli, Cattedrale di Sant'Eusebio) is the principal church of the city of Vercelli in Piedmont, Italy, and the cathedral of the Archdiocese of Vercelli. It is dedicated to Saint Eusebius of Vercelli, the first bishop.

== History ==
The present cathedral was built on the site of earlier ones. The construction of the first, in the 4th century, is ascribed to Saint Eusebius himself, who, it is believed, built it over an ancient necropolis containing the remains of Saint Theonestus, to whom Eusebius dedicated it. After Eusebius's death he was buried there himself, and the dedication changed accordingly. This building was destroyed during the Gothic invasions of the 5th century. Its replacement was a large basilica inspired by those of Rome and Ravenna. A major refurbishment was carried out in the 9th century. In the 11th century, another major restoration took place, as a consequence of extreme decay and in particular of a serious fire in 997 that threatened the stability of the structure. In the 12th century, the present campanile was built, and the main body of the cathedral was restored again: it now had five aisles separated by columns, a transept and an imposing portico. The apse was decorated with mosaics, and in the presbytery was an ambo sculpted by Benedetto Antelami.

In the second half of the 16th century, Pellegrino Tibaldi of Valsolda was commissioned by the then bishop, Guido Ferrero, to rebuild the cathedral entirely to replace the medieval building, which the bishop had demolished. Tibaldi was able to erect the choir, the side chapels and the two sacristies before lack of funds brought the work to a halt after eight years. In 1682 a chapel to the south was built for the tomb of Blessed Amadeus IX. Between 1702 and 1717 Stefano Negro built the nave, aisles and transept. The remaining parts of the structure, including the west front, were completed in 1757–63 by Benedetto Alfieri and Luigi Barberis, who towards the end of the 18th century also added a chapel off the northern aisle for the relics of Saint Eusebius, which had been discovered during the reconstruction works of the 16th century. This was rebuilt in the late 19th century by Giuseppe Locarni, and the urn containing the remains is now located beneath the high altar. Giovanni Larghi added a dome in 1857-60.

In a chapel off the southern nave are buried not only Blessed Amadeus IX, for whose tomb it was built, but also other members of the former ruling house of Savoy, including Charles I, Charles III, Yolande of Valois (wife of Blessed Amadeus) and Victor Amadeus I.

== Treasury and library ==
The cathedral possesses both an important treasury, now a museum, and the important chapter library, housing the Vercelli Book and the Codex Vercellensis.

== Sources and external links ==
- Website of the Commune of Vercelli: the Ecclesiastic Metropolis
- Cathedral treasury (in Italian)
- SOS Vercelli: Cathedral closed for building works from February 2011 (in Italian)
- Photographs
