= Morgari =

Morgari is a surname. Notable people with the surname include:

- Beatrice Morgari (1858–1936), Italian painter
- Luigi Morgari (1857–1935), Italian painter
- Oddino Morgari (1865–1944), Italian journalist and politician
- Paolo Emilio Morgari (1815–1882), Italian painter
- Pietro Morgari (1852–1885), Italian painter
- Rodolfo Morgari (1827–1909), Italian painter
