= Pietro Morgari =

Italian painter (1852–1885)

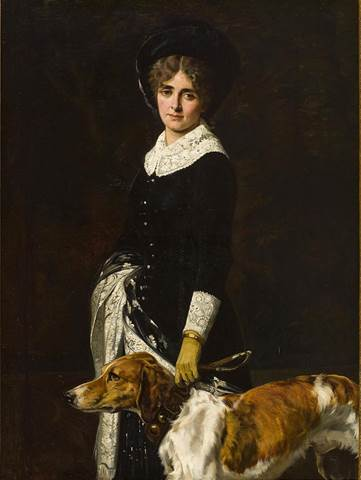
Young Woman with Dog

Pietro Morgari (1852 – 1885) was an Italian painter, primarily of portraits.

== Biography ==
He studied at the Albertina Academy of Fine Arts of Turin, where his father was a professor of ornamentation. At the academy, he was also mentored by Andrea Gastaldi and Enrico Gamba. Pietro was born to a family of painters. Pietro's father, Rodolfo (1827 - 1909) was a prominent painter in Turin. Rodolfo's brother, and Pietro's uncle, Paolo Emilio Morgari (1815-1882) was also a painter. Rodolfo's father was Giuseppe Morgari (1788-1847). Paolo Emilio had three children Luigi (1857-1935) and Beatrice (1858-1936), both painters, and Oddino (1865-1944), a journalist and politician.

In 1880 at the Accademia, he exhibited, Violazione di confini; depicting a poignant encounter of a stallion and a mare with colt. The painting was reproduced by L'Illustrazione Italiana, published by the Fratelli Treves. He also painted: L'ultima cacciata del Conde di Monterosso. At Milan, in 1881, he exhibited: Desolation, in 1883 again at Milan, he exhibited: May. In 1883 at Rome, he displayed Dolor, and in 1884 at Turin: Caccia alla volpe and Idillio. Other works include Attori girovaghi.

He collaborated with Tommaso Juglaris in many commissions for the studio of his father Rodolfo and his uncle Paolo Emilio. In 1871, after a physical argument with Pietro, Juglaris left the Morgari employment. He joined the society of Acquafortisti (watercolorists) in 1874. In 1878 at Paris, he had a reconciliation with Juglaris.

He moved to London in 1883 and committed suicide there two years later, possibly as the result of a frustrated love affair.
