= Clementina Morgari Lomazzi =

Italian painter (1819–1897)

- Born: 1819; Guastalla, Italy
- Died: 1897 (aged 77–78); Turin, Italy
- Known for: Painting
- Movement: Genre painting
- Spouse: Paolo Emilio Morgari

Clementina Morgari Lomazzi (Guastalla, 1819 – Turin, 1897) was an Italian painter, mainly of genre scenes of intimate, family moments.

== Biography ==
She studied at the Accademia Albertina of Turin under Francesco Scaramuzzi, and married Paolo Emilio Morgari (1815-1882), a painter of sacred subjects, who was the brother of Rodolfo Morgari, professor of ornamentation at the academy. Clementina had three children: Luigi (1857-) and Beatrice (1858-), both painters, and Oddino, a politician. Tommaso Juglaris was one of her pupils. In 1856 she was nominated honorary associate of the Academy of Modena and in 1864 to the Academy of Urbino. She exhibited at the Promotrice of Turin from 1845 to 1881.
