= Paolo Emilio Morgari =

Italian painter

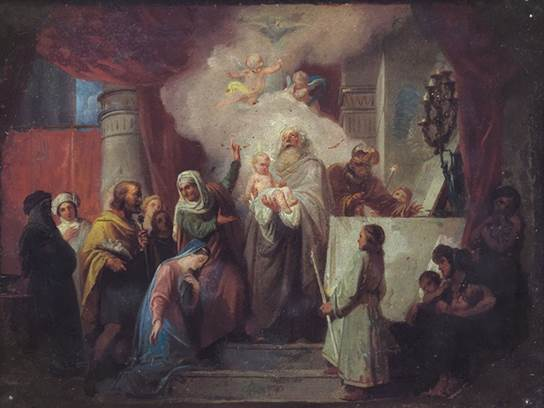
The Baptism (1870)

Paolo Emilio Morgari (1815–1882) was an Italian painter, primarily of religious subjects.

== Biography ==
Paolo Emilio was born to a family of painters. His father, Giuseppe Maria Morgari (1788–1847), was his first teacher. His brother Rodolfo Morgari was a prominent painter and professor of the Accademia Albertina in Turin. Rodolfo Morgari. Paolo Emilio had three children: Luigi and Beatrice, both painters, and Oddino, a journalist and politician. Paolo Emilio's wife, Clementina Morgari Lomazzi, was also a painter.

At the Academy, he also worked under Giovan Battista Biscarra. Morgari painted mainly altarpieces and large church fresco cycles. He painted in the following churches of Turin: Church of San Massimo (1853), Church of Santi Maurizio e Lazzaro (1858–1859), the Church of the Visitazione, and, in collaboration with Rodolfo his brother, in the Church of San Carlo. In collaboration with Luigi Hartmann (1807–1884), he helped decorate (1861–1866) the cathedral of Fossano and the parish church in Santhià. He painted the apse of Mondovì Cathedral.

Paolo Emilio was also active as an engraver and lithographer. He engraved drawings for the Elements of Physiologic Anatomy (1839) used by the students at the Accademia Albertina. In collaboration with Tommaso Juglaris, he helped decorate the stairwell entrance to the Royal Palace and the portico of the city hall of Turin (1865).
