= Gradella =

Coordinates: 45°25′33″N 9°31′58″E

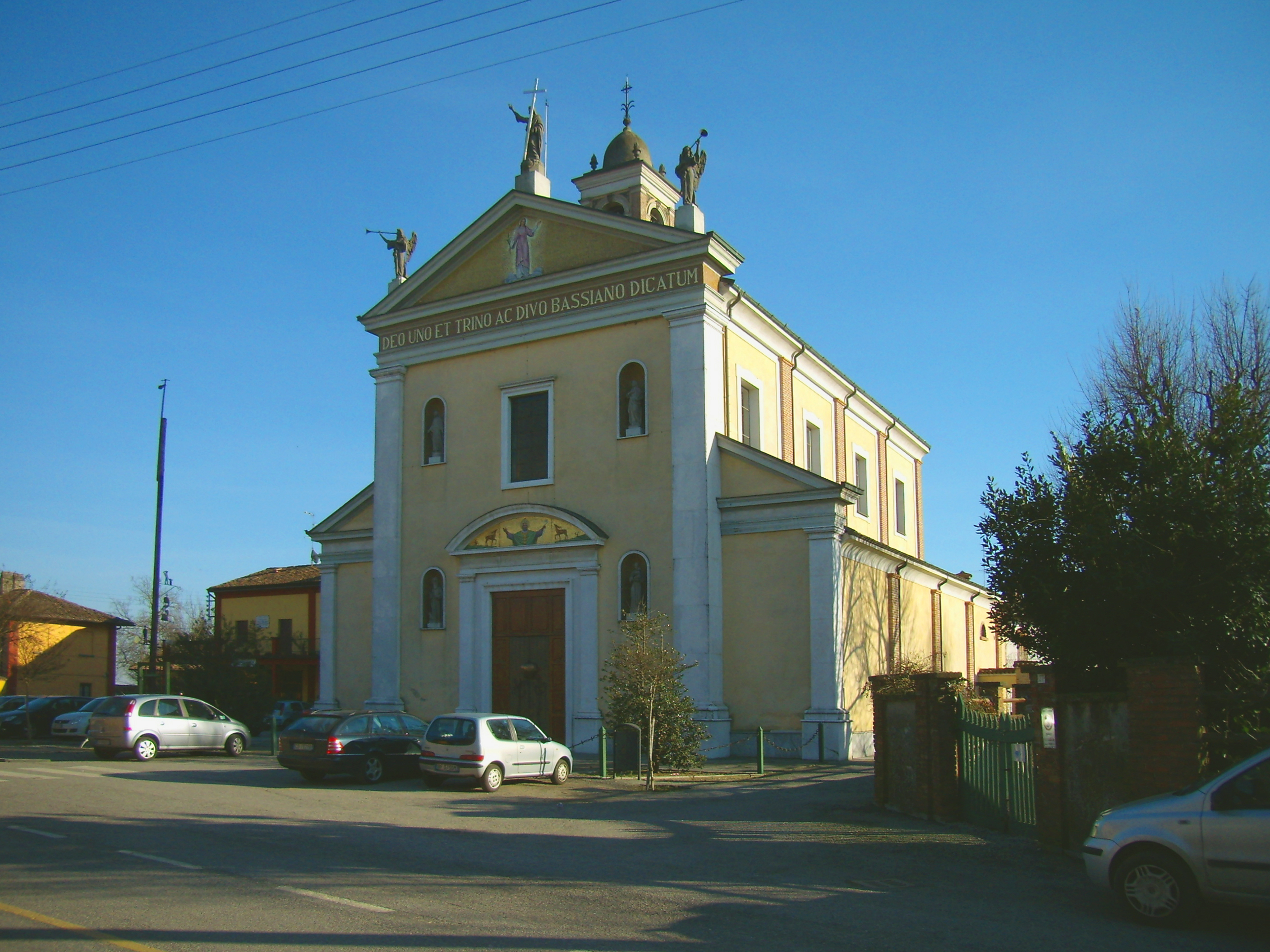
The parish church

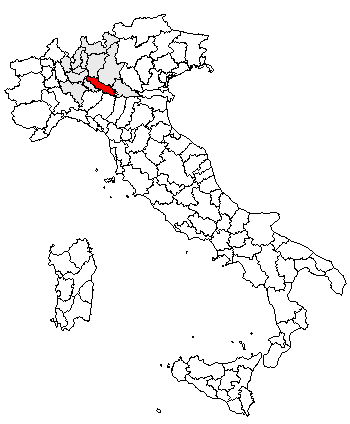
Location of the province of Cremona

Gradella is a village in the province of Cremona in Italy. It is a frazione of the comune of Pandino. It is one of I Borghi più belli d'Italia ("The most beautiful villages of Italy").

== History ==
The origins of Gradella come back to the Early Middle Ages (probably between the 8th and the 9th centuries), and it had to be a lombard garrison with a castle probably destroyed in the 13th century.

== Main sights ==
- The parish church of the Holy Trinity and Saint Bassian, 19th century

== Notable people ==
- Egidio Miragoli, (born 1955) bishop of Mondovì
