= Rodolfo Morgari =

Italian painter (1827–1909)

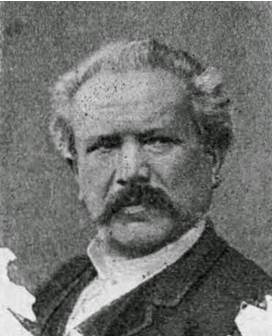
Rodolfo Morgari (date unknown)

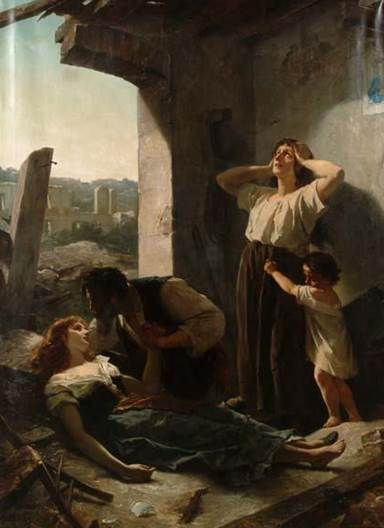
Episode after 1883 earthquake at Casamicciola (1884)

Rodolfo Morgari (1827 – 1909) was an Italian painter, primarily of genre and historical scenes.

== Biography ==
Rodolfo was born to a family of painters. Rodolfo's son was Pietro Morgari (1852–1885). His brother was Paolo Emilio Morgari (1815–1882). Rodolfo's father was Giuseppe Morgari (1788–1847). Paolo Emilio had three children: Luigi (1857–1935) and Beatrice (1858–1936), both painters, and Oddino (1865–1944), a journalist and politician.

He studied at the Accademia Albertina at Turin, and was associated with the institution most of his life. He fought in the First War of Italian Independence in 1848. He was a professor of Ornamentation at the Accademia, and part of the Turin Circolo degli Artisti.

Among his works: Consolatrix afflictorum; The Guardian Angel and Death of Raphael. In 1884 at Turin, he exhibited Episode after 1883 earthquake at Casamicciola and The Aurora of 29 July 1883. In 1887 at Venice, he displayed: Tre sorelle. He also made many portraits. He was made a knight of the Order of the Crown of Italy.

He was commissioned to do the restoration (1869) of the Church of the Visitation in Turin. Along with his son Pietro and Tommaso Juglaris, he worked on the fresco decoration of the parish church of Castelnuovo d’Asti (Castelnuovo don Bosco). Rodolfo also painted many conventional altarpieces for churches in Piedmont, for example: a Jesus at Gesthemane and Resurrection (1906) for the parish church of Moretta; the ceilings of San Carlo in Turin; and also altarpiece for a church in Vigone.
