= Church of the Visitation, Turin =

Church in Piedmont, Italy

Church of the Visitation
- Chiesa della Visitazione
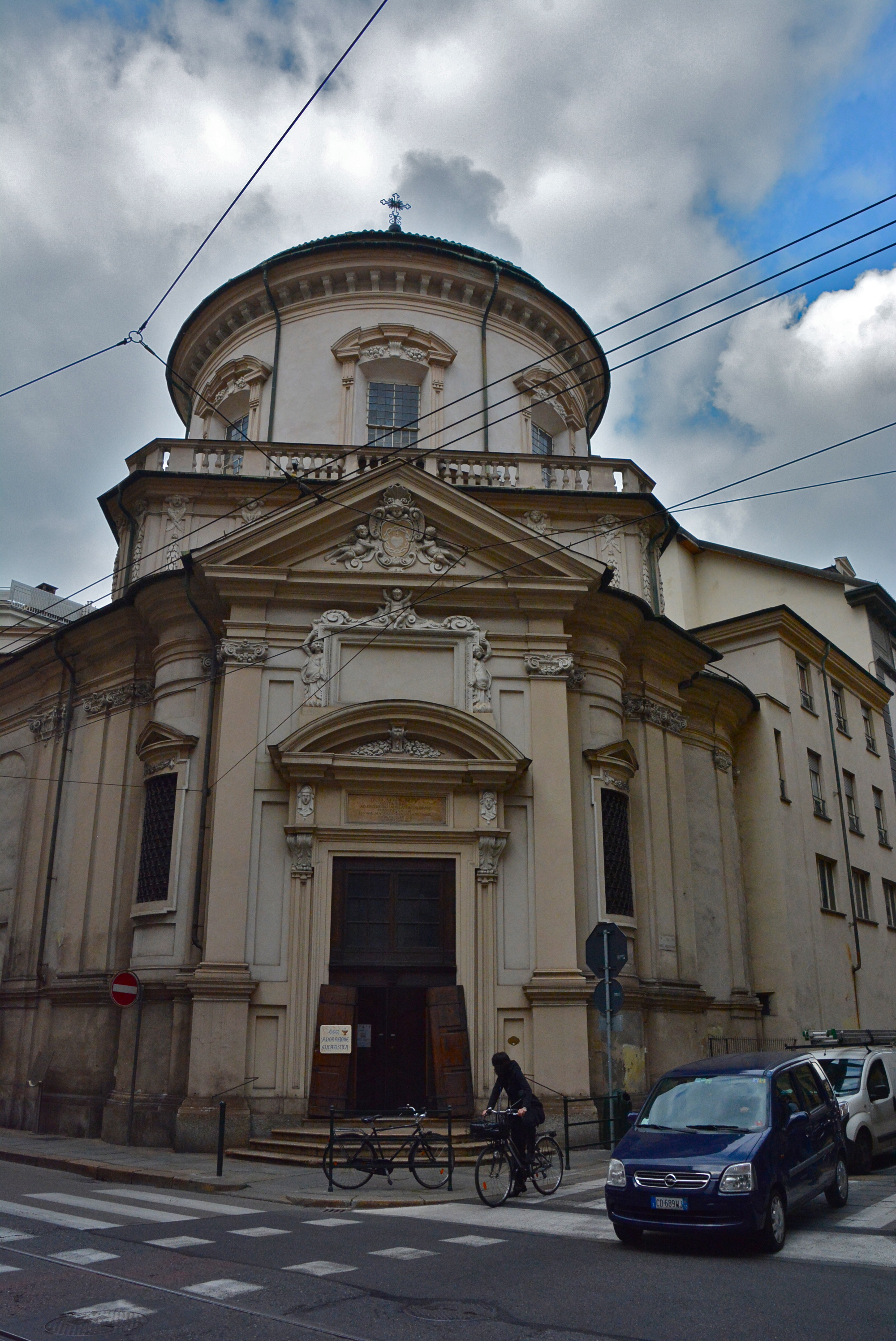
- Corner facade of Church
- Church of the Visitation
- 45.066348°N 7.679888°E
- Denomination: Roman Catholic Church

Architecture
- Groundbreaking: 1657
- Completed: 1660

Administration
- Archdiocese: Turin

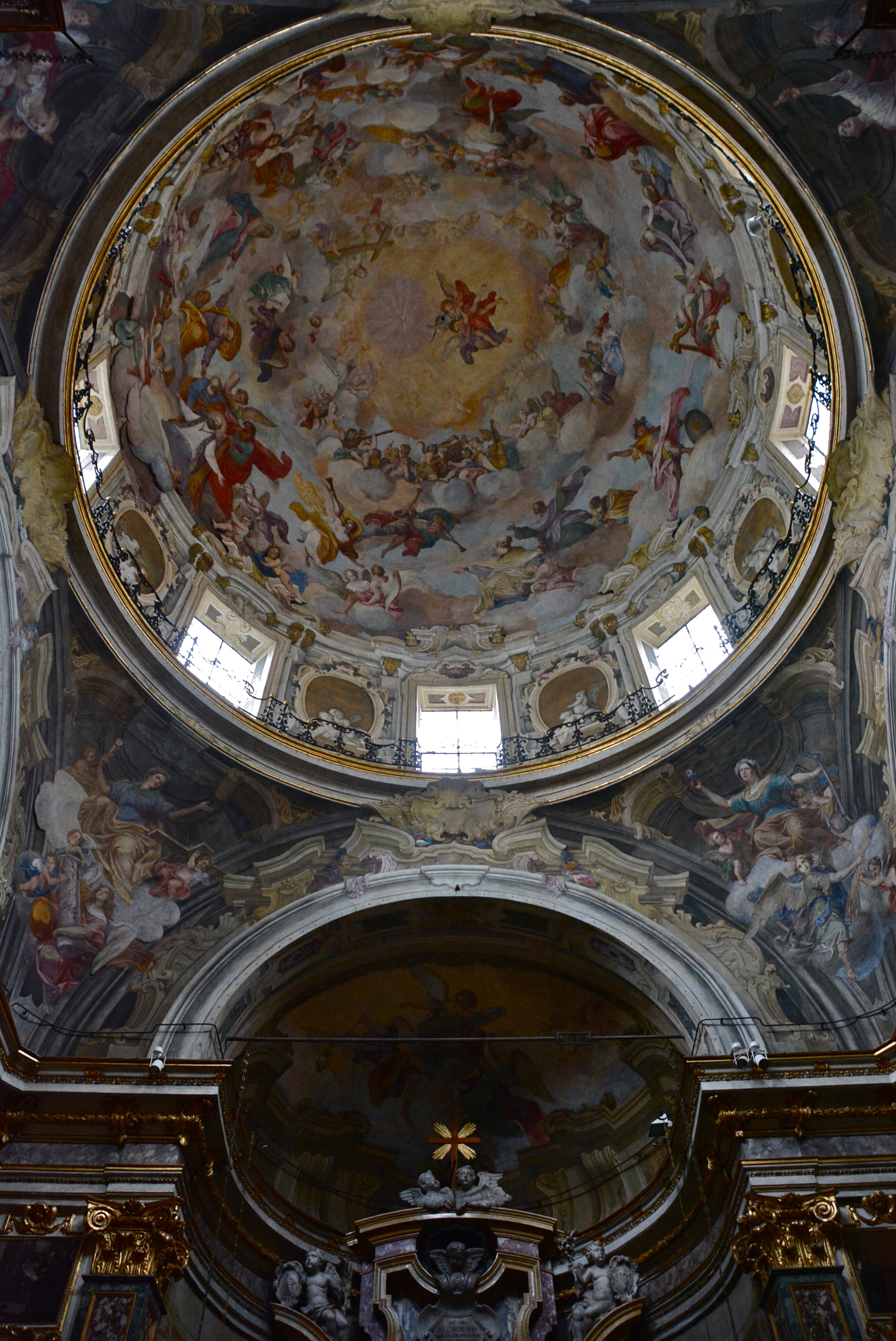
Frescoed cupola

The Church of the Visitation (Italian: Chiesa della Visitazione) is a 17th-century Roman Catholic church, attached to a monastery, located on Via XX Settembre #23 in central Turin, region of Piedmont, Italy.

== Background ==
By 1638, with the blessing of the Matilde of Savoy, the order of the nuns of the Visitation, founded by Jeanne-Françoise Frémiot de Chantal, were able to found a monastery at the site. Under Matilde's patronage, they were able to commission the church from the architect Francesco Lanfranchi. The chamfered corner location gives the tall Baroque-style domed church a scenographic quality. As typical of Piedmontese Baroque architecture, the dome is close to the entrance. The layout is that of a Greek cross, with an opening from the presbytery to a large chapel-like area, now the sanctuary of the Passion, where the nuns could attend services apart from the community. This area now holds the remains of the blessed Marco Antonio Durando.

The interior was decorated with frescoes by a team of artists, including Luigi Vannier in the ceiling of the presbytery. The elaborate dome frescoes, however, were painted over a century after the church's construction, circa 1768, by Michele Antonio Milocco. It depicts the Glory of St Francis of Sales (canonized in 1665). In the pendants of the dome are depicted the Theological Virtues.

Other works inside the church are the stucco statuary in the presbytery by Cristoforo Ciseri. There are twenty canvases on the presbytery walls attributed to Giovanni Sacchetti. The polychrome main altar, with Solomonic columns of black marble, is attributed to Carlo and Giuseppe Busso, while the main altarpiece, initially was a canvas depicting the Visitation of Mary and Elizabeth by Vannier. This was later replaced by a painting of the same topic by Ignazio Nepote. In the chapel to the left, dedicated to St Francis of Sales and Alessandro Trona, is an altar (1730) designed by Filippo Juvarra. The altarpiece depicts St Francis providing the rules of the Order to the Saint Giovanna Francesca Fremiot di Chantal. Chantal was ultimately canonized in 1768.

During the French occupation of the Piedmont under Napoleon, the convent was deconsecrated and the nuns expelled. The site was returned only to the church in 1830, when it was granted to the Congregation of the Mission of Saint Vincent de Paul, who still hold the site. Under the patronage of the blessed Marco Antonio Durando, the order restored the church. In 1838, they added a chapel on the right dedicated to their founder, St Vincent de Paul. Frescoes for the nun's choir, depicting scenes from the Passion of Christ were painted by Paolo Emilio and Luigi Morgari.
