= Egidio Miragoli =

Italian prelate

His Excellency Egidio Miragoli
- Bishop of Mondovì
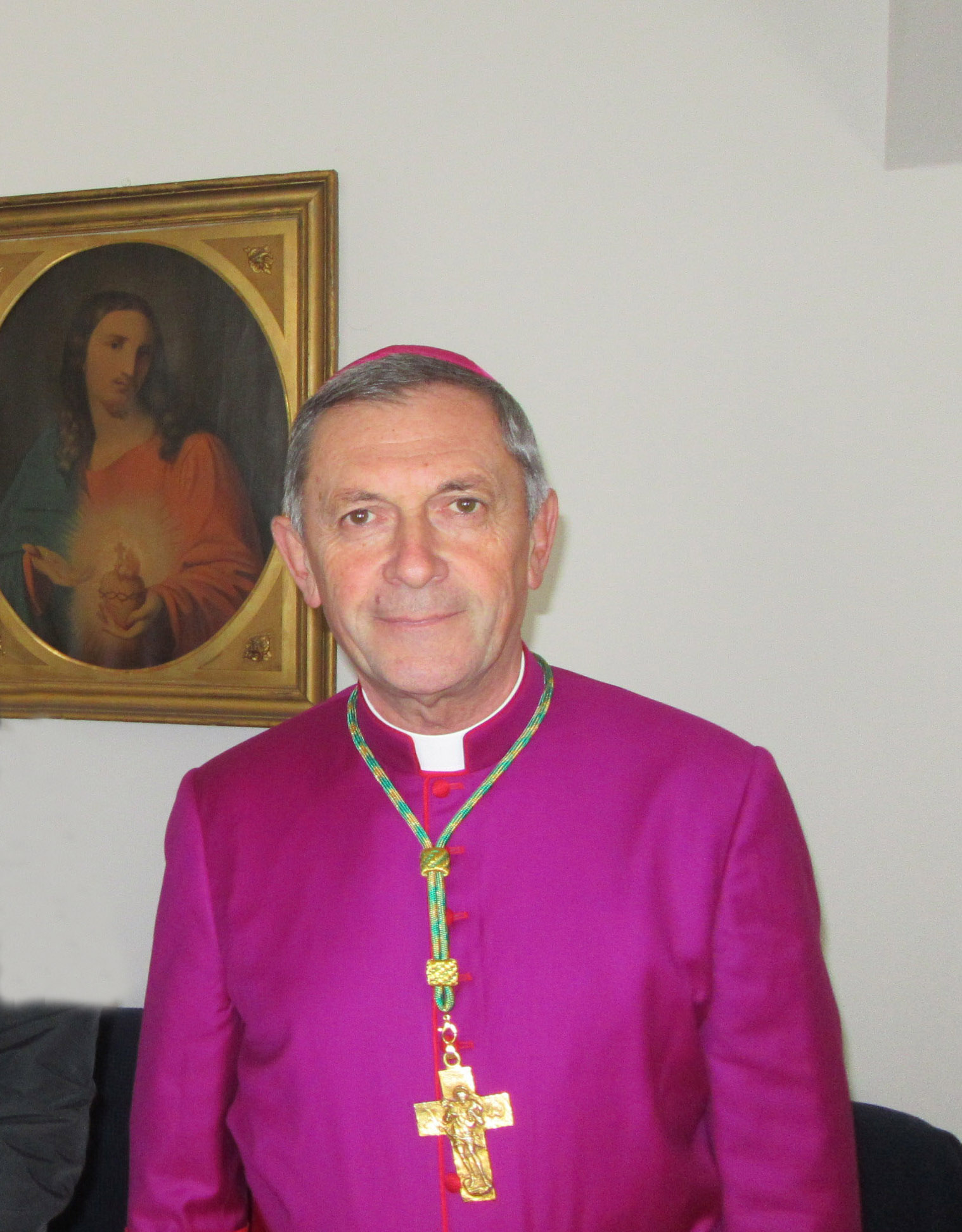
- Miragoli on 11 November 2017
- Church: Roman Catholic Church
- Archdiocese: Diocese of Turin
- Diocese: Diocese of Mondovì
- In office: 29 September 2017
- Predecessor: Luciano Pacomio
- Previous post: Pastor at Frances Xavier Cabrini parish in Lodi

Orders
- Ordination: 23 June 1979
- Consecration: 12 November 2017 by Maurizio Malvestiti

Personal details
- Born: 20 July 1955 (age 71) Gradella
- Education: Pontifical Gregorian University
- Motto: In eo qui me confortat
- Coat of arms

Styles of Egidio Miragoli
- Reference style: The Most Reverend
- Spoken style: Your Excellency
- Religious style: Monsignor
- Posthumous style: none

Egidio Miragoli is an Italian prelate of the Catholic Church who has been bishop of Mondovì since September 2017.

== Biography ==
Egidio Miragoli was born in Gradella, a frazione of Pandino, in 1955, and was ordained a priest on 23 June 1979 by bishop Paolo Magnani. He continued his theological studies at Lodi seminary and at the Pontifical Gregorian University, where he earned his doctorate in canon law.

In addition to pastoral assignments he was private secretary to the bishops of Lodi Paolo Magnani and Giacomo Capuzzi from 1982 to 1994; director of theology studies at the Episcopal Seminary from 1988 to 1994; defender of the bond of the Diocesan Tribunal from 1985 to 2003; promoter of justice from 1988 to 2003; director of the Priestly Institute of Mary Immaculate and Saint Pius X from 1990 to 2004; professor of canon law at the Joint Seminary of Crema-Cremona-Lodi-Vigevano beginning in 1982.

Beginning in 1994 he was pastor at Frances Xavier Cabrini parish in Lodi; in 2006 he became vicar for external areas and in 2007 he became a judge at the ecclesiastical regional tribunal of Lombardy.

He helped found and joined the editorial board of the journal Quaderni di Legge Ecclesiale.

On 29 September 2017, Pope Francis appointed him Bishop of Mondovì. He was consecrated in Lodi on 11 November 2013 by Maurizio Malvestiti, Bishop of Lodi. He took possession of his see on 8 December.

On 29 July 2019, Pope Francis named him College for the examination of appeals in matters of serious offenses, erected within the Congregation for the Doctrine of the Faith.

On 3 June 2021, Pope Francis tasked Miragoli with conducting a review of the Congregation for the Clergy in anticipation of the replacement of its prefect, Cardinal Beniamino Stella, who turns 80 in August. He expected it would take at least the month of June to complete.

On 5 October 2022 he was elected Secretary of the Piedmontese Episcopal Conference.

On 28 August 2025 he was appointed as member of the Dicastery for the Clergy.

== Publications ==
- Il sacramento della penitenza. Il ministero del confessore: indicazioni canoniche e pastorali, curatela. Milano, Àncora Editrice, 1999, ISBN 88-7610-764-9
- Il Consiglio pastorale diocesano secondo il Concilio e la sua attuazione nelle diocesi lombarde, tesi di dottorato, Roma, Pontificia università gregoriana, 2000, ISBN 88-7652-855-5

== Gallery ==
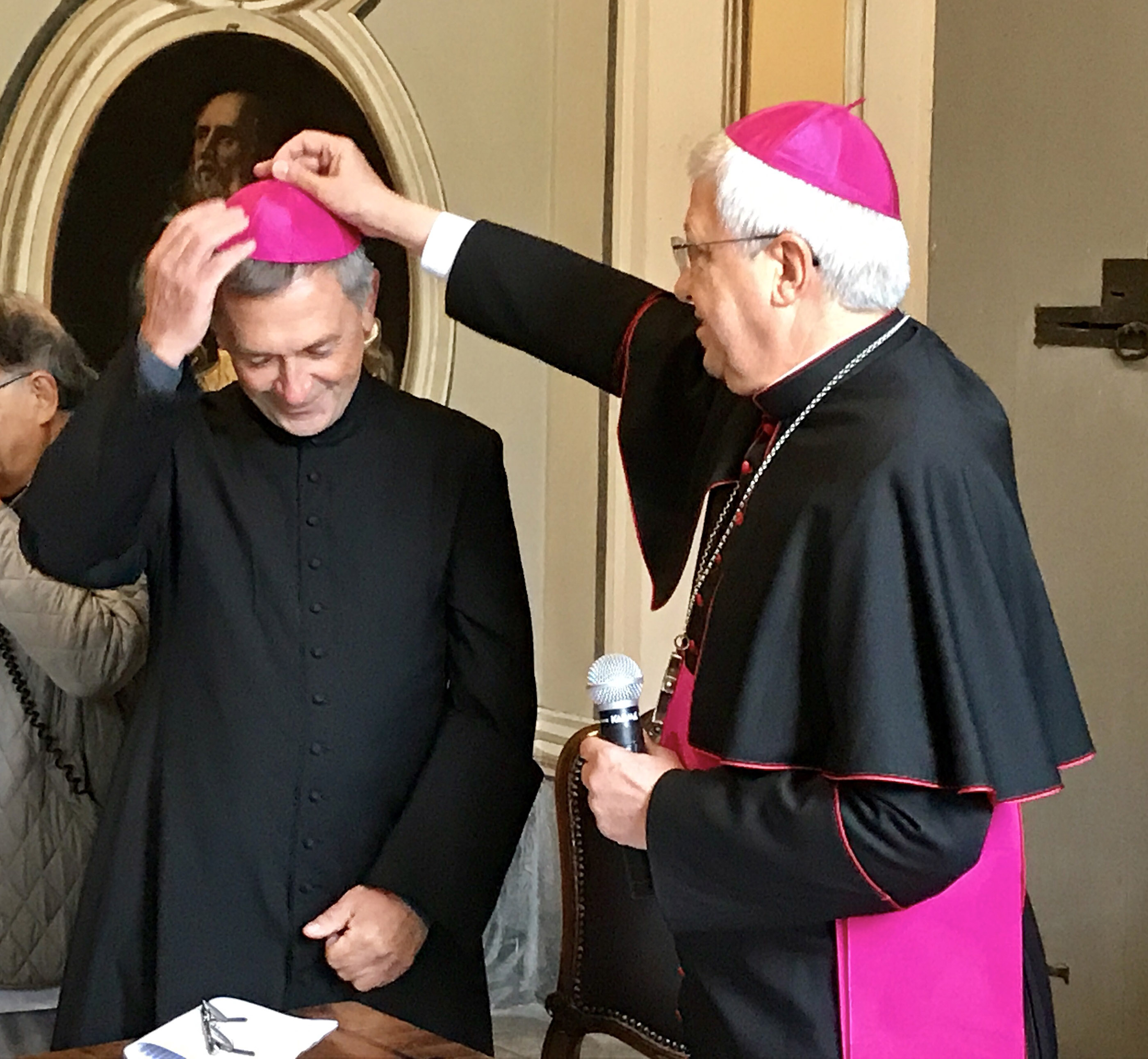
Egidio, just named a bishop, receives the zucchetto from bishop Maurizio Malvestiti, 29 September 2017

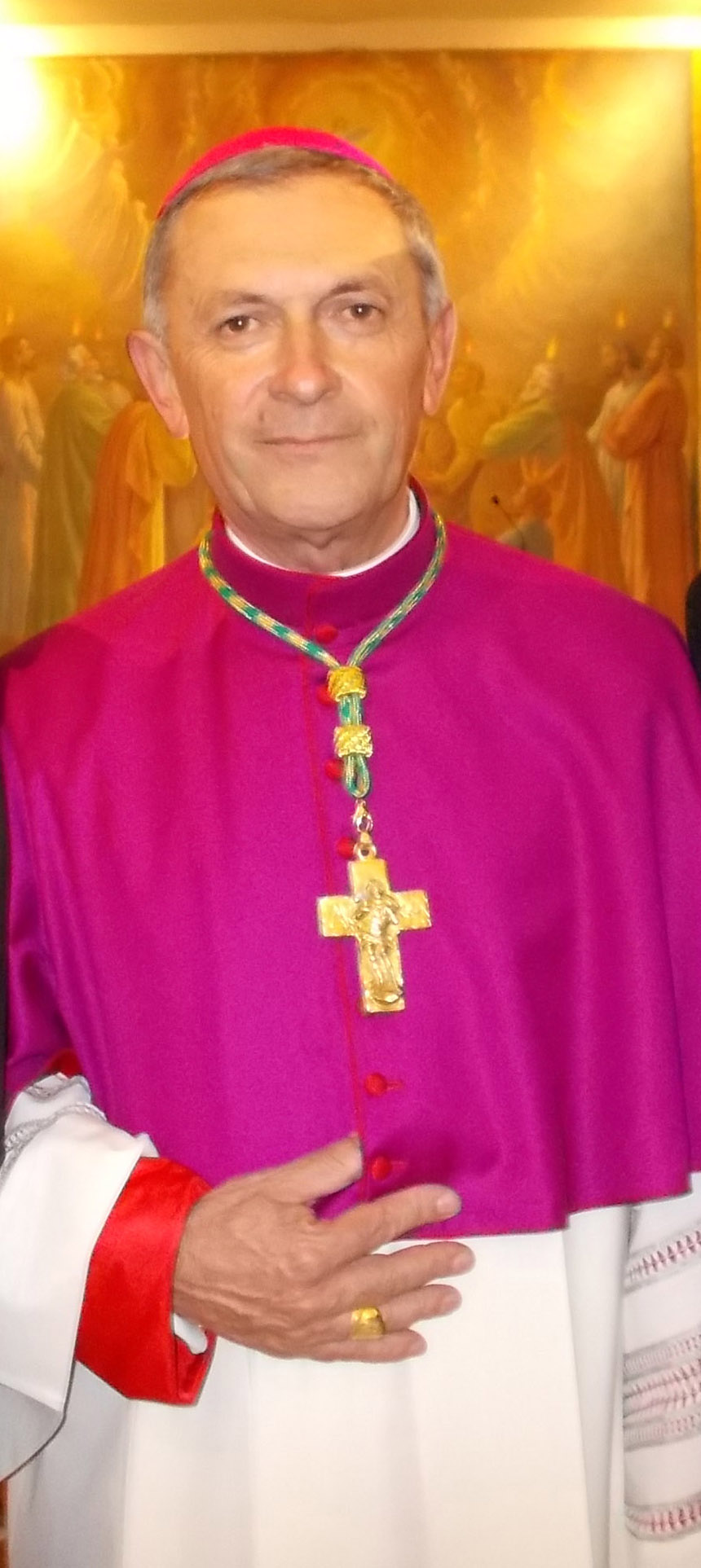
Miragoli on the day of his episcopal ordination, 11 November 2017

Catholic Church titles
Preceded by Luciano Pacomio	Bishop of Mondovì; 2017–present	Incumbent
