= Marcantonio Durando =

Italian Catholic priest (1801–1880)

Blessed Marcantonio Durando C.M.

Priest
- Born: 22 May 1801; Mondovì, Cuneo, Kingdom of Sardinia
- Died: 10 December 1880 (aged 79); Turin, Kingdom of Italy
- Venerated in: Roman Catholic Church
- Beatified: 20 October 2002, Saint Peter's Square, Vatican City by Pope John Paul II
- Feast: 10 December
- Attributes: Priest's cassock
- Patronage: Nazarene Sisters; Missionaries

Marcantonio Durando, CM (22 May 1801 – December 1880) was an Italian Catholic priest in the Congregation of the Mission. He founded the Daughters of the Passion of Jesus the Nazorean (1865), or Nazarene Sisters, with the assistance of Luigia Borgiotti.

Durando was made a Servant of God on 23 March 1941 under Pope Pius XII and Pope John Paul II both declared him as Venerable on 1 July 2000 and beatified him on 20 October 2002.

== Life ==
Marcantonio Durando was born in 1801 in Mondovì as one of ten children to Angela Vinaj (d. 1822); two siblings died as infants. The home overlooked the main square and near the Mondovì Cathedral. He was baptized in 1801. Durando's mother was religious and instilled faith in her children while his father possessed liberal ideas and was of agnostic tendencies.

Durando had as brothers Giacomo (4 February 1807 – 21 August 1894) – the foreign affairs minister of the 1862 Rattazzi Government – and Giovanni (23 June 1804 – 27 May 1869) – a papal soldier and general who refused the orders of Pope Pius IX in 1848 and moved his soldiers past the Po River to defect. His brothers were therefore involved in the Risorgimento.

In 1841 he commenced his studies for the priesthood in Mondovì. In 1816 he desired to join the missions in China. Durando made his perpetual vows as a member of the Congregation of the Mission in 1818 after completing his philosophical studies and having had received the tonsure and the minor orders. After his time in the novitiate he was sent to resume his theological studies in Sarzana. The Vincentian superior who oversaw his novitiate reported to the superior of his theological studies: "Brother Durando is someone of the highest quality in every way, and is clearly sent by God for the current needs of the congregation ... He is calm, he is sympathetic, is respectful and humble; so I hope you will be very pleased with him".

His studies were suspended in 1822 due to the ill health he faced and the death of his mother. Durando was ordained to the priesthood on 12 June 1824. His superiors refused to send him to the missions despite his requests.

He remained in Casale Monferrato until 1829 when he relocated to Turin. He remained in Turin until his death and was made superior of the Turin branch of the congregation in 1831. In 1837 he was appointed as the Major Superior of the Vincentians in the north and held that post until his death. This forced him to reduce his workload due to the greater work he had to undertake. Nevertheless, he continued to organize priests for the missions and preached spiritual retreats that attracted numerous people. He re-established the Ladies of Charity in 1835 for the noblewomen of Turin. Durando supported the new work of the Propagation of the Faith – created in France in 1822 that Pauline-Marie Jaricot founded – and in 1855 instituted the Brignole-Sale school for those wanting to join the foreign missions in which he oversaw the formation of priests who applied for missions.

Luigi Fransoni – the Archbishop of Turin – entrusted him with the spiritual direction of the Sisters of Saint Joseph and contributed to the writing of the rules for the Sisters of Saint Ann. He also became a spiritual guide for the Poor Clares. Tancredi Falletti and his wife Juliette Colbert were the founders and heads of those two orders branched for the two genders.

Durando tried in his mission as a priest to oppose the rigors of Jansenism that plagued the times. He saw the usefulness in introducing the Vincentian Sisters from France to the Italian peninsula and so petitioned King Carlo Alberto to welcome them; the king did so in 1833 and the sisters assumed charge of hospitals with an emphasis on those with soldiers in places such as Genoa and Turin. The first two religious came on 16 May 1833 with more arriving in August. In 1855 he sent the sisters to the frontlines during the Crimean War to help the wounded. Around this time the bishop Giustino de Jacobis invited Durando to serve with him in Ethiopia but the latter refused for his obligations tied him to Turin.

On 21 November 1865 he founded an order for women – the Nazarene Sisters – alongside Luigia Borgiotti who became one of the new order's first postulants.

He also spread the message of the Miraculous Medal of Catherine Labouré and to that effect established the Children of Mary in 1856. This caused an increase in vocations so much so that Carlo Alberto in 1837 granted them the convent of S. Salvario in Turin to use for their work.

In 1857 he wrote to his brother Giacomo during the period of anti-clerical sentiment and greater conflict: "With all my heart I want peace between the government and the church, and that there should be an end to this uneasiness in which we find ourselves all the time, and an end, in short, to this attacking of the church and its institutions and its rules, and, in short, that we be allowed to live and breathe". Durando wrote a long letter again to his brother in 1870 to explain his puzzlement at the hostile situation that also saw the loss of the Papal States.

Durando died on 10 December 1880. Giovanni Rinaldi – the superior of the Casa della Pace branch in Chieri – said of Durando's death: "we have lost another St. Vincent".

== Beatification ==
The beatification process opened in Turin after Cardinal Giuseppe Gamba inaugurated the informative process in 1928. Maurilio Fossati closed the process in 1930 which received validation from the Congregation of Rites in 1951. Fossati's spiritual writings were approved by theologians on 14 November 1934 and 27 November 1937. Fossati also inaugurated the beginning of an apostolic process that started in 1940 and concluded not long after. The formal introduction to the cause came on 23 March 1941 under Pope Pius XII, granting Durando the title of Servant of God.

The official Positio then was submitted to Rome at which point theologians voiced a favorable response to the dossier on 12 January 1971 while a historical commission met and approved the cause on 21 September 1978. The members of the Congregation for the Causes of Saints voiced their approval as well on 27 March 1979 though met for a second time to discuss the cause further on 20 June 2000. Durano became titled as Venerable – on 1 July 2000 – after Pope John Paul II confirmed the fact that the late priest had in fact lived a life of heroic virtue.

The process for a miracle opened in Turin in 1936 and concluded not long after in which all interrogatories and medical documentation was collected. The C.C.S. validated this process decades later on 13 January 1995 while a medical board approved the healing to be a miracle on 19 February 2001. Theologians followed this verdict on 12 October 2001 while the members of the C.C.S. did so as well on 20 November 2001. The pope approved the miracle on 20 December 2001.

John Paul II beatified Durando on 20 October 2002. The miracle in question involved the cure of Mrs. Stella Ingiani who grew ill and later was comatose after the 28 November 1932 birth of her daughter in her home. Durando's order begged for their founder's intercession and Ingiani awoke from her coma to a rapid cure.
