= Carlo Antonio Ripa =

17th-century Roman Catholic bishop

Most Reverend Carlo Antonio Ripa
- Bishop of Mondovi
- Church: Catholic Church
- Diocese: Diocese of Mondovì
- In office: 1632–1641
- Predecessor: Carlo Argentero
- Successor: Maurizio Solaro di Moretta

Personal details
- Born: 1582
- Died: 20 Sep 1641 (age 59)

Carlo Antonio Ripa (1582–1641) was a Roman Catholic prelate who was Bishop of Mondovi (1632–1641).

== Biography ==
Carlo Antonio Ripa was born in 1582. On 19 January 1632, he was appointed during the papacy of Pope Urban VIII as Bishop of Mondovi. On 25 January 1632, he was consecrated bishop by Antonio Marcello Barberini, Cardinal-Priest of Sant'Onofrio, with Antonio Provana, Archbishop of Turin, and Giovanni Francesco Passionei, Bishop of Cagli, serving as co-consecrators. He was Bishop of Mondovi until his death on 20 September 1641.

== External links and additional sources ==
- Chow, Gabriel. "Diocese of Mondovi (Italy)". GCatholic.org. (for Chronology of Bishops) ^{[self-published]}
- Cheney, David M. "Diocese of Mondovi". Catholic-Hierarchy.org. (for Chronology of Bishops) ^{[self-published]}

Catholic Church titles
Preceded by Carlo Argentero	Bishop of Mondovi; 1632–1641	Succeeded by Maurizio Solaro di Moretta
