= Visconti Castle (Pandino) =

Castle in Pandino, Lombardy, Italy

- Castello Visconteo di Pandino
- Pandino
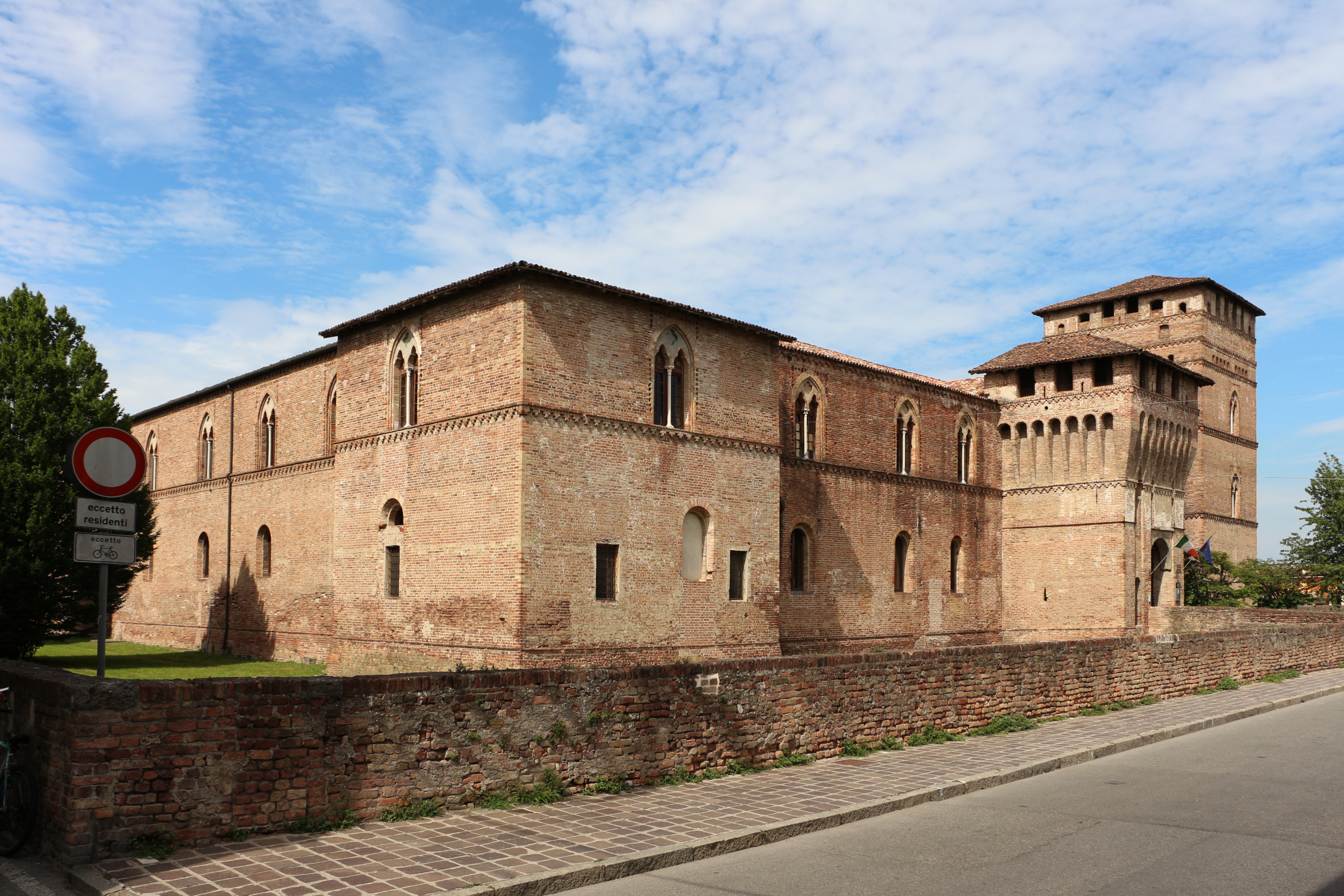
- Southwestern corner with the south entrance barbican and the southeastern corner tower in the background

Site information
- Type: Medieval castle
- Owner: Pandino municipality
- Open to the public: Yes
- Condition: Good

Location
- Coordinates: 45°24′20″N 9°33′15″E
- Height: 30 metres (98 ft) (2 towers)
- Length: 66 metres (217 ft) (4 sides)

Site history
- Built: 1355-1361
- Built by: Regina della Scala and Bernabò Visconti
- Materials: Bricks

The Visconti Castle in Pandino (Castello Visconteo di Pandino) is a 14th-century castle located in the center of the town of Pandino, province of Cremona, region of Lombardy, Italy. It was built by Bernabò Visconti and his wife, Beatrice Regina della Scala, between 1355 and 1361. Today it essentially retains its original forms.

== History ==
=== Visconti and Sforza period ===
In 1355, Bernabò Visconti, Lord of Milan, and his wife Regina Della Scala commissioned a castle at Pandino. They conceived the building as a courteous residence open to the landscape more than a fortification.

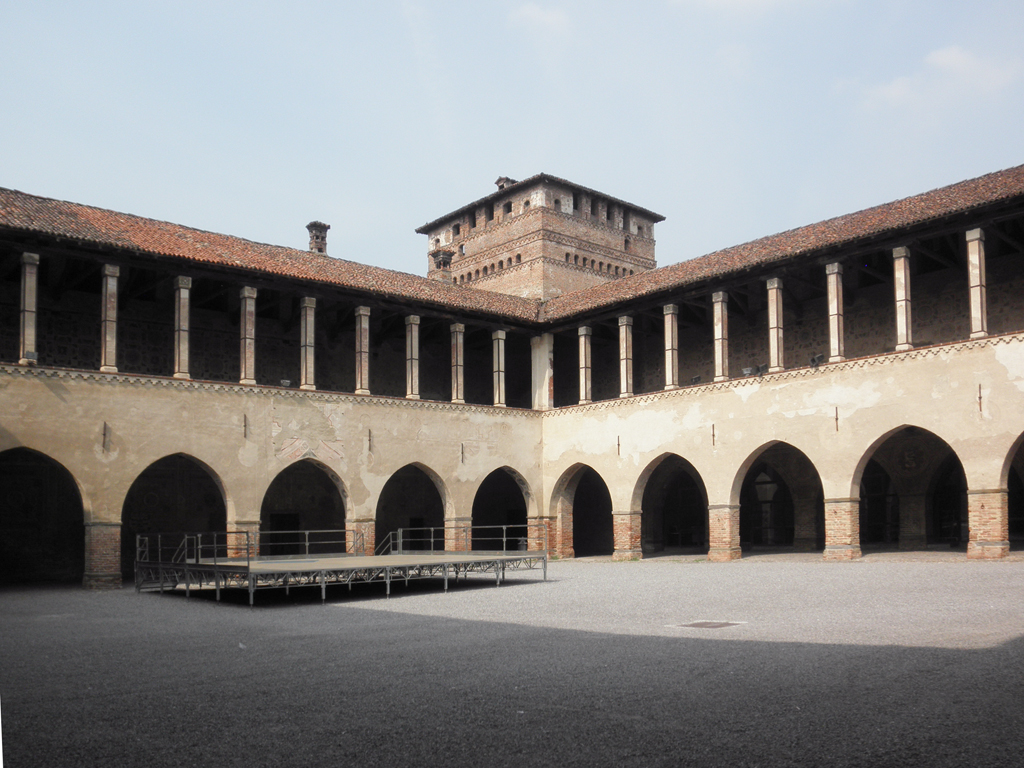
Inner courtyard

The castle is quadrilateral in plan with corner towers and an internal courtyard with a hemming ground-floor portico with stout brick columns with pointed arches. A loggia with denser simple columns overlooks the courtyard on the upper floor. The outer sides measure 66 metres (217 ft), and the corner towers are 30 metres (98 ft) high.

Externally, it has single windows on the ground floor and mullioned pointed windows on the upper floor. A moat surrounded the castle.

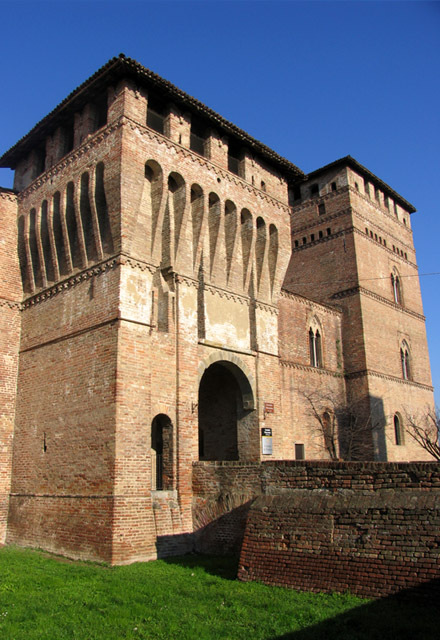
Principal entrance

In the 15th century, the Visconti were replaced by the Sforza. Other defensive structures, including two towers, were added to the castle's entrances.

=== Subsequent owners ===
After the Sforza period, the castle changed hands a few times until 1552, when Marchese D'Adda acquired it. It remained the property of this family until the 19th century. The castle slowly deteriorated and was finally used to house farmers' families and for agricultural storage. In the 20th century, two corner towers fell into ruin.

In 1947, it was purchased by the Pandino municipality, which initiated the restoration. Subsequently, the restoration extended to the original paintings with the geometric motif of the quatrefoil containing the alternated coats of arms of the Visconti and Della Scala.

== Today ==
Today the castle is the seat of the municipal offices. Of the four towers of the original building, only those of the eastern wing have remained intact. The interior retains the frescoed decoration, including painted architecture and friezes that often include the symbols of Bernabò and Regina's families.

Photographs by Paolo Monti

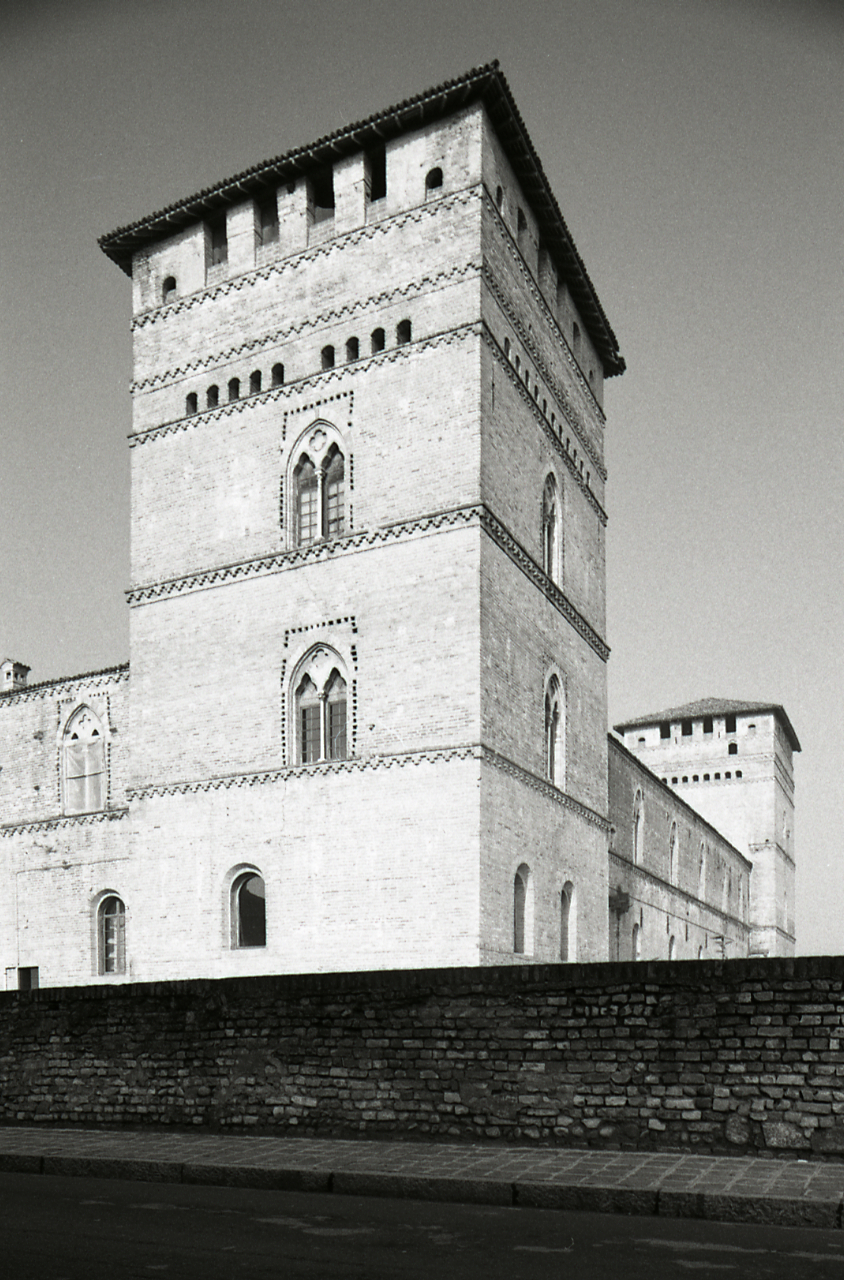
Tower from the East

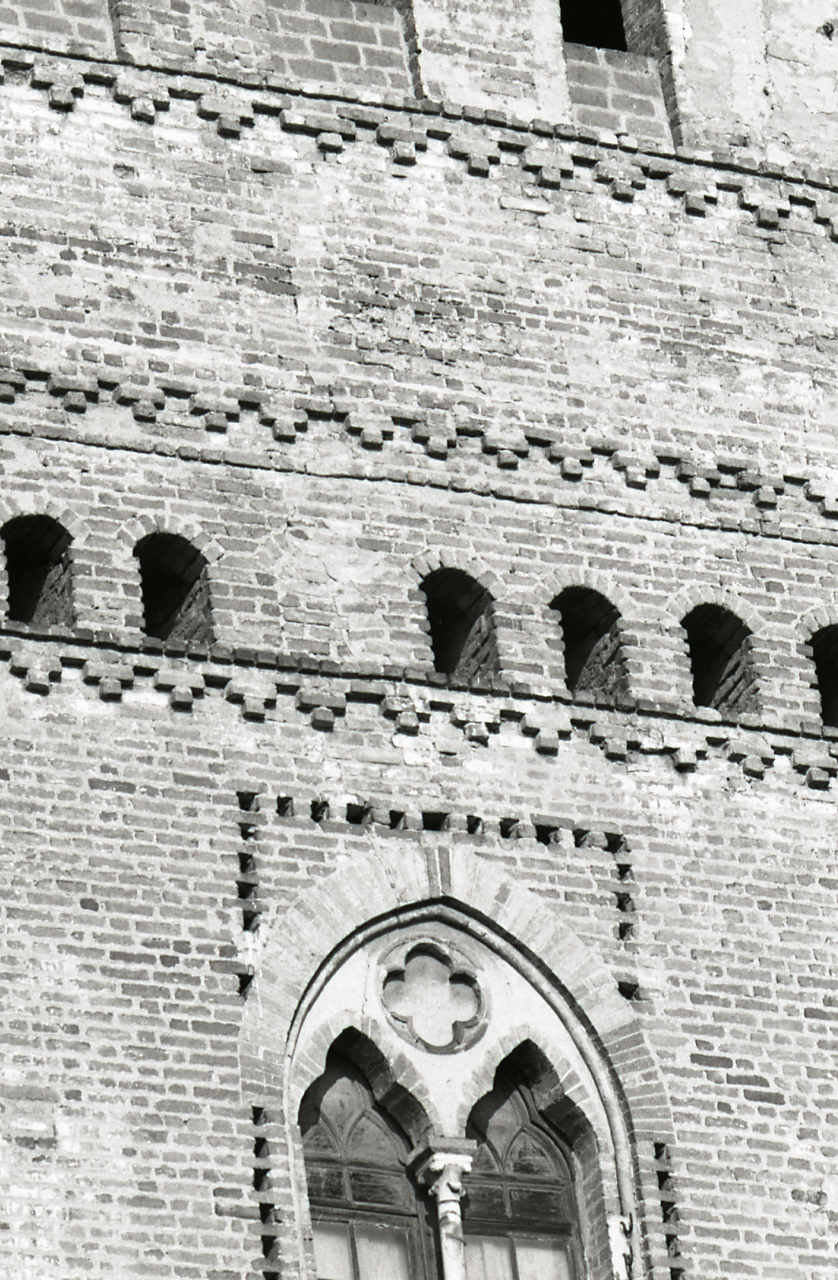
Details of the windows

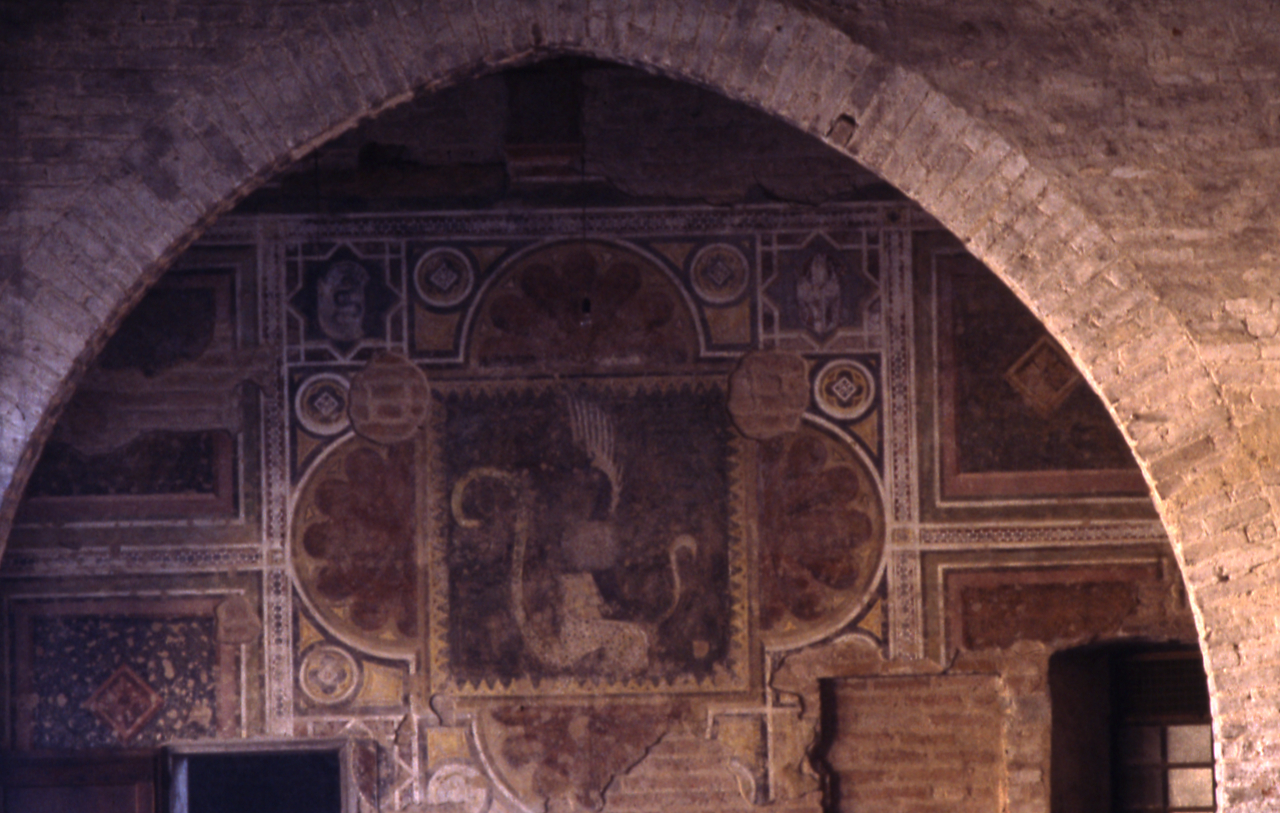
Frescos

== Sources ==
- Conti, Flavio; Hybsch, Vincenzo; Vincenti, Antonello (1992). I castelli della Lombardia. Provincie di Cemona e Mantova (in Italian). Novara: Istituto Geografico de Agostini. ISBN 88-415-0147-2.
- Romano, Serena (2015). "Visconti Painting at Pandino Castle. Antique and Modern in Fourtheenth-Century Lombardy". In Foletti, Ivan; Frantovà, Zuzana (eds.). The Antique Memory and the Middle Ages. Leiden, Boston: Brill. pp. 127–147. ISBN 978-88-6728-157-2.
- Sant'Ambrogio, Diego (1907). "Castello di Pandino. Proprietà del marchese d'Adda". Ville e Castelli d'Italia. Lombardia e laghi (in Italian). Milan: Edizioni della Tecnografica. pp. 425–430.
