= Maurizio Solaro di Moretta =

Italian Roman Catholic prelate

Most Reverend Maurizio Solaro di Moretta
- Bishop of Mondovi
- Church: Catholic Church
- Diocese: Diocese of Mondovì
- In office: 1642–1655
- Predecessor: Carlo Antonio Ripa
- Successor: Michele Beggiami

Orders
- Consecration: Alessandro Cesarini (iuniore) by 22 June 1642

Personal details
- Born: 1607 Saluces, Italy
- Died: 25 December 1655 (aged 47–48) Mondovì, Italy

Maurizio Solaro di Moretta (1607 – 25 December 1655) was a Roman Catholic prelate who served as Bishop of Mondovi (1642–1655).

== Biography ==
Maurizio Solaro di Moretta was born in Saluces, Italy in 1607. On 16 June 1642, he was appointed during the papacy of Pope Urban VIII as Bishop of Mondovi. On 22 June 1642, he was consecrated bishop by Alessandro Cesarini (iuniore), Cardinal-Deacon of Sant'Eustachio, with Alessandro Castracani, Bishop Emeritus of Nicastro, Patrizio Donati, Bishop of Minori, serving as co-consecrators. He served as Bishop of Mondovi until his death on 25 December 1655.

While bishop, he was the principal co-consecrator of Gerolamo Mascambruno, Bishop of Isernia (1642); and Francesco Agostino della Chiesa, Bishop of Saluzzo (1642).

== External links and additional sources ==
- Cheney, David M. "Diocese of Mondovi". Catholic-Hierarchy.org. (for Chronology of Bishops) ^{[self-published]}
- Chow, Gabriel. "Diocese of Mondovi (Italy)". GCatholic.org. (for Chronology of Bishops) ^{[self-published]}

Catholic Church titles
Preceded by Carlo Antonio Ripa	Bishop of Mondovi; 1642–1655	Succeeded by Michele Beggiami
