= Luciano Pacomio =

Italian bishop

- Bishop emeritus of Diocese of Mondovì
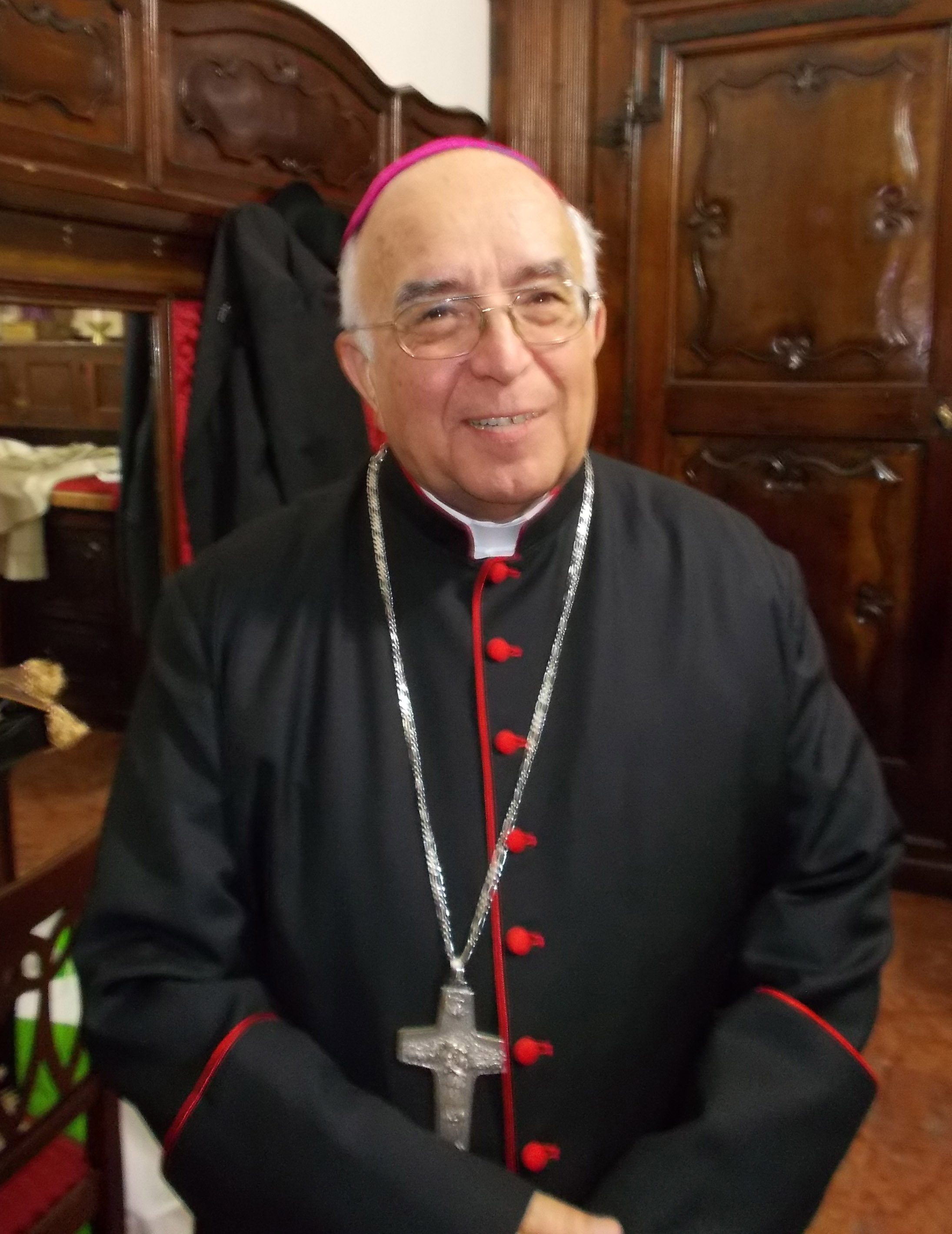
- Church: Roman Catholic Church
- See: Diocese of Mondovì
- In office: 1996-2017
- Predecessor: Enrico Masseroni
- Successor: Egidio Miragoli
- Previous posts: Bishop of Mondovì; 1996-2017

Orders
- Ordination: June 29, 1951

Personal details
- Born: November 4, 1941 (age 84) Villanova Monferrato, Italy
- Coat of arms

Luciano Pacomio (born November 4, 1941, in Villanova Monferrato) is the emeritus bishop of the Roman Catholic Diocese of Mondovì.

== Biography ==
He was ordained a priest on June 29, 1965.

He was appointed bishop of Mondovì on December 3, 1996.

He was appointed bishop of Mondovì on December 3, 1996, and received his episcopal consecration on January 6, 1997, following from pope John Paul II. He replaced the previous bishop of Mondovì Enrico Masseroni and took retirement on September 29, 2017.

== Resources ==
- Profile of Mons. Pcomio ^{[self-published]}
- Site of Diocese of Mondovì

Catholic Church titles
| Preceded by Enrico Masseroni | Bishop of Mondovì; 1996 - 2017 | Succeeded by Egidio Miragoli |
