= Sears Gallagher =

American painter

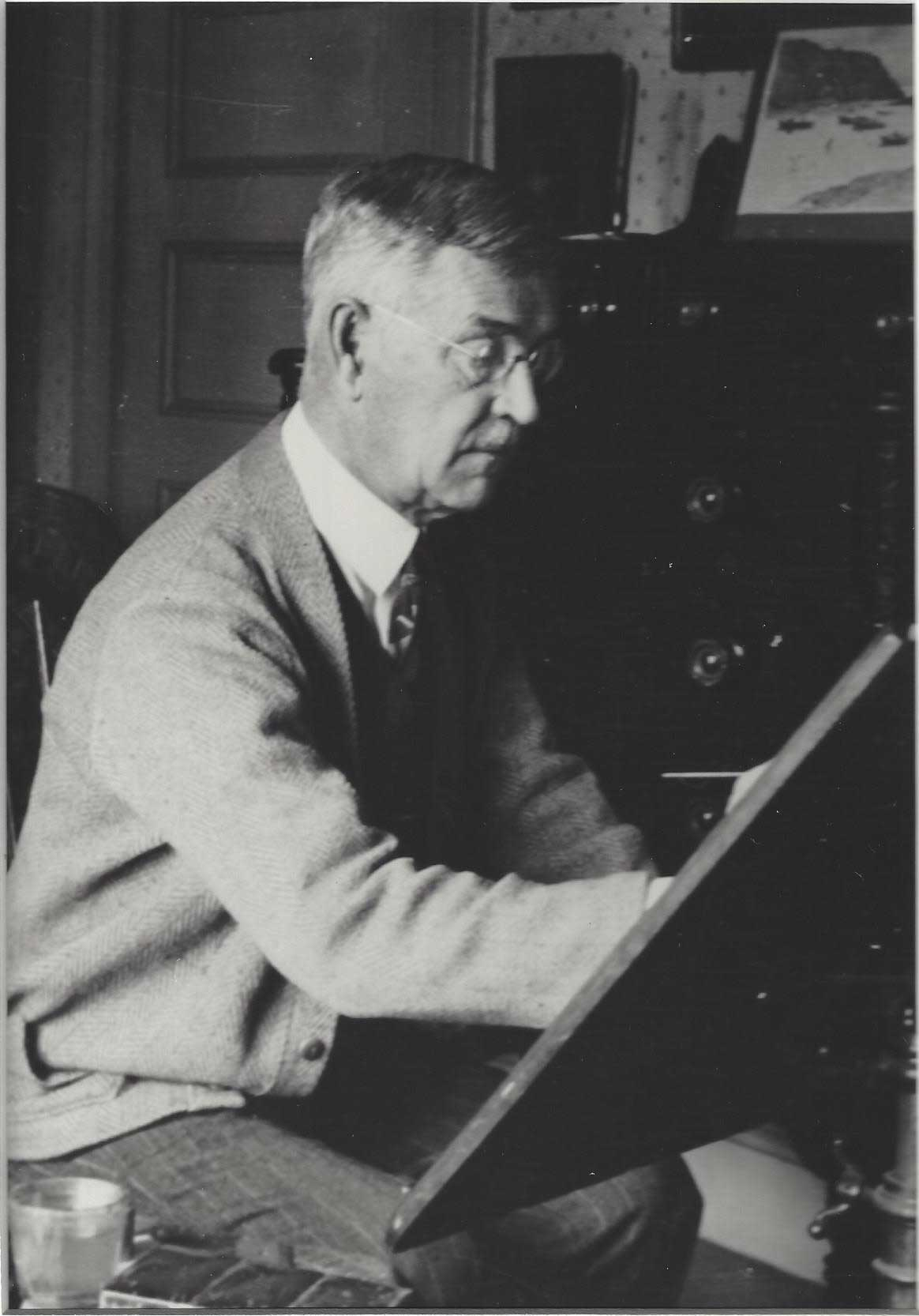
- Born: April 30, 1869; South Boston, Massachusetts
- Died: June 9, 1955 (aged 86); West Roxbury, Massachusetts
- Burial place: Walnut Hills Cemetery
- Education: The English High School; Académie Julian
- Occupation: Artist

Sears Gallagher (April 30, 1869 – June 9, 1955) was an American artist proficient in drawing, etching, watercolor and oil painting. His work consisted largely of landscapes, seascapes, and cityscapes depicting his native Boston and northern New England, especially Monhegan Island, Maine. Illustrating magazines and books provided steady work and income, and his etchings and prints attracted popular demand. Gallagher took his art seriously, adapted new techniques, and was open to the influence of European Impressionism. During the height of his career his watercolors were favorably compared to those of Winslow Homer and F. W. Benson, and his etchings and drypoints to those of James McNeill Whistler.

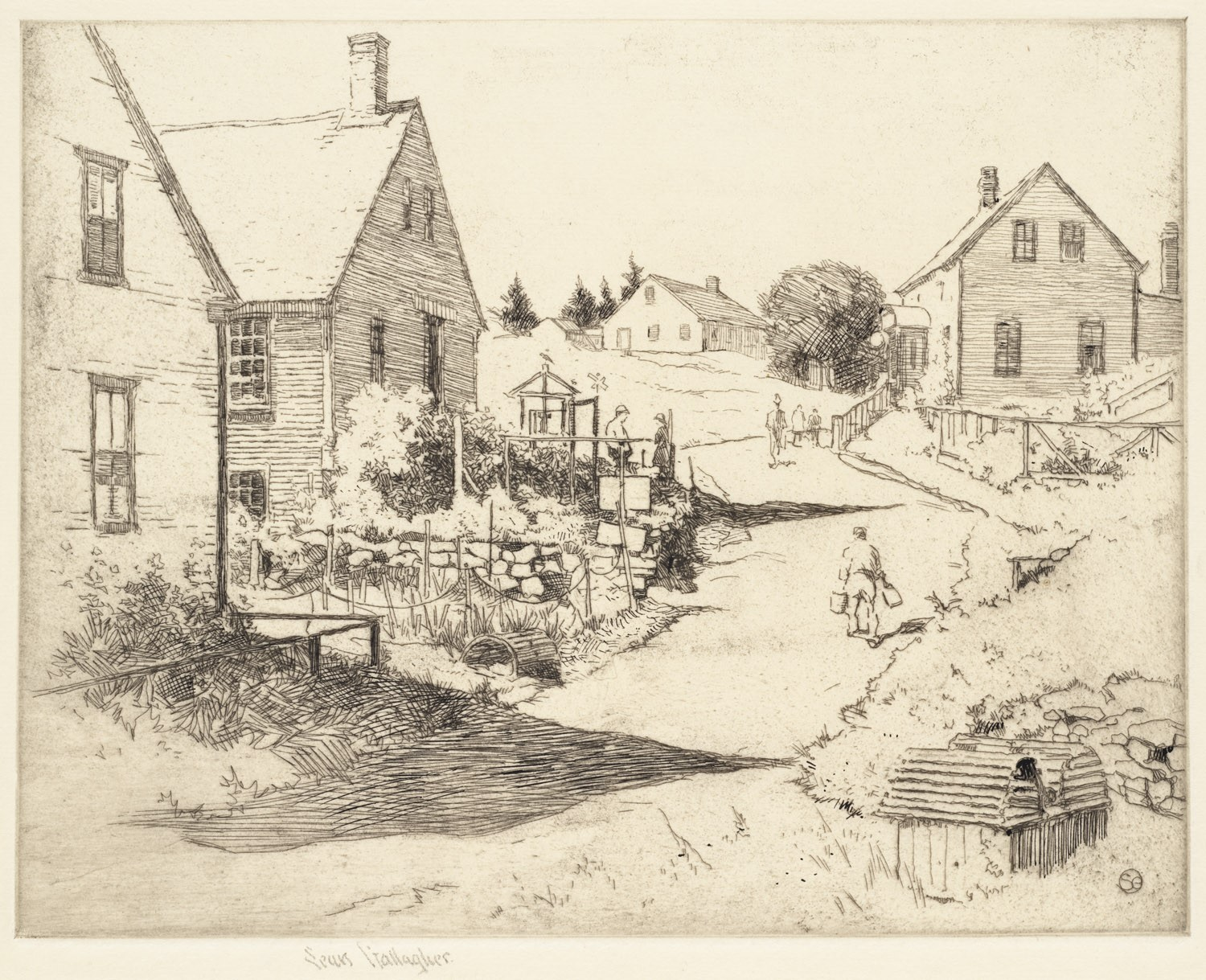
"Broadway, Monhegan; Early Morning" by Sears Gallagher. Photograph courtesy of the Boston Public Library by permission of the artist's heirs.

== Training and early career ==
Gallagher was born April 30, 1869 in South Boston to parents who were members of the city's mercantile class; his father was a cabinetmaker and stove merchant and his mother was a descendant of Massachusetts Bay Colony pilgrims. He seems to have had a natural talent for drawing, remarked on by family and friends in his early years. During the time he was a student at the English High School of Boston he also studied with artist George H. Bartlett in a private night school. He had a drawing selected for exhibition at the Boston Art Club in 1887, when he was only 18. While launching his career as an illustrator for magazines and books, he also pursued a career as an artist of etchings and watercolors, enhancing that career through additional training, first in Boston and then in Paris. For about two years, from 1887 to 1889, he studied figure drawing and worked in the Boston studio of Italian-born art teacher and muralist, Tommaso Juglaris. Gallagher also received instruction, especially in the techniques of etching, from Charles H. Woodbury, an accomplished and successful artist who founded the Ogunquit School of Art in Maine. Gallagher and Woodbury remained lifelong friends. After Juglaris returned to Italy, Gallagher began studying with Samuel Peter Rolt Triscott, an English-born painter with a growing reputation in Boston.

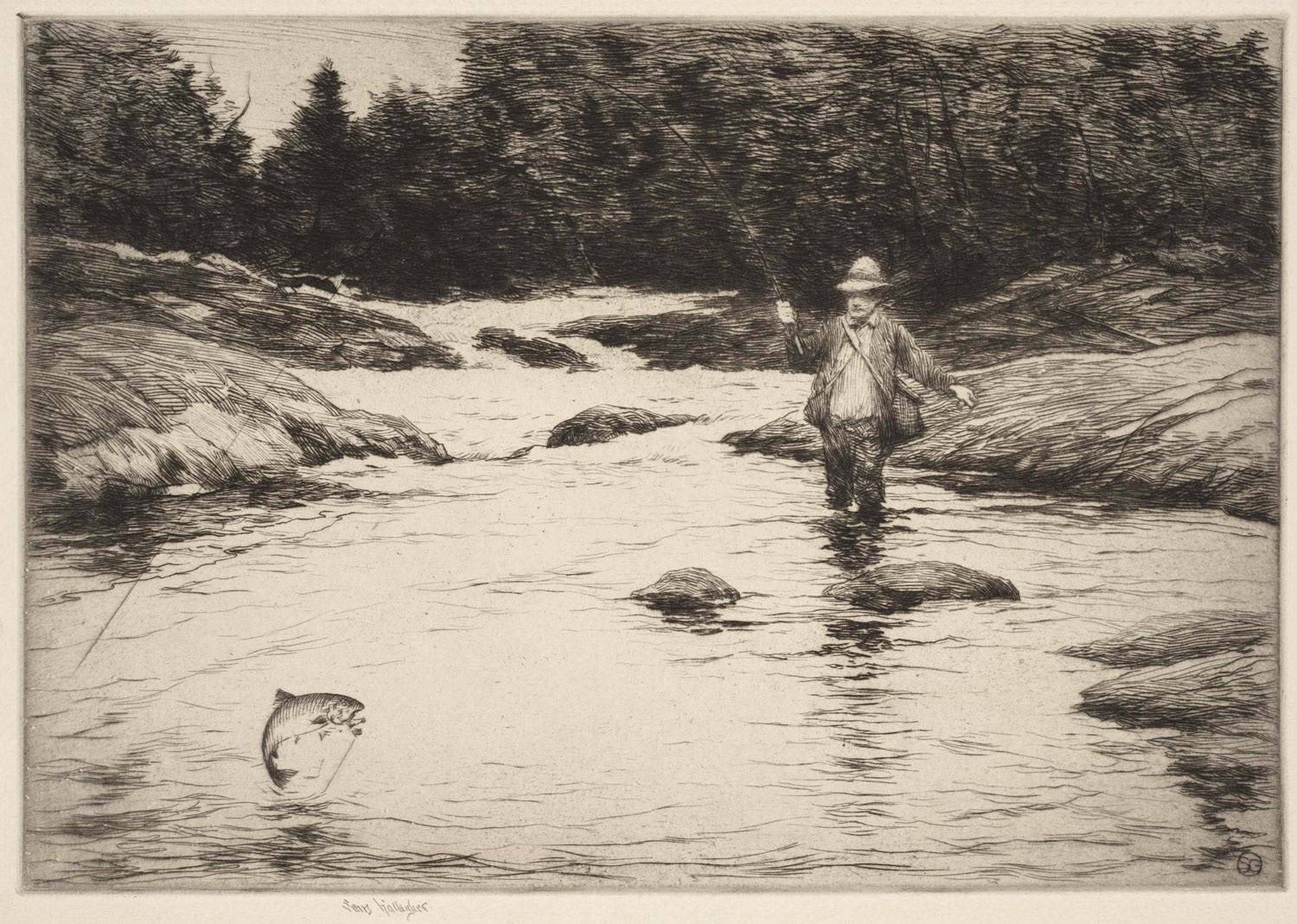
"In the Rapids" Etching by Sears Gallagher. Photograph courtesy of the Boston Public Library by permission of the artist's heirs.

In 1892, Triscott and Gallagher made a summer trip to Monhegan Island, off the coast of Maine. Monhegan, which Gallagher visited regularly for the next 40 years and where he bought a house in 1904, was a frequent subject of his painting. Its rocky shore and bold cliffs appear in such works as Crashing Surf, Monhegan, Maine. His summer visits to Monhegan were often followed by fishing and sketching trips in the fall to the White Mountains of New Hampshire.

In April 1895, Gallagher married Charlotte Dodge and shortly thereafter left on a honeymoon to Europe, beginning in England but with the apparent goal of settling in Paris for further instruction. Like such other Americans as Woodbury, F. W. Benson, Edmund Tarbell, and Childe Hassam, Gallagher joined the ateliers of Jean-Paul Laurens and Jean-Joseph Benjamin-Constant at the Académie Julian and settled in to study and paint. Two of his watercolors from his work there were selected for inclusion in the 1896 Paris Salon.

By the time he and his wife returned to Boston in 1896, his reputation as a watercolorist and his success in Europe established him as an important young artist. Gallagher purchased a house in West Roxbury, Massachusetts, close to Boston, in 1897 and settled into a life of middle-class ease, remaining in the same house until his death. A son, Bradford, was born in 1904, and a daughter, Katherine, in 1906.

== Mature career ==
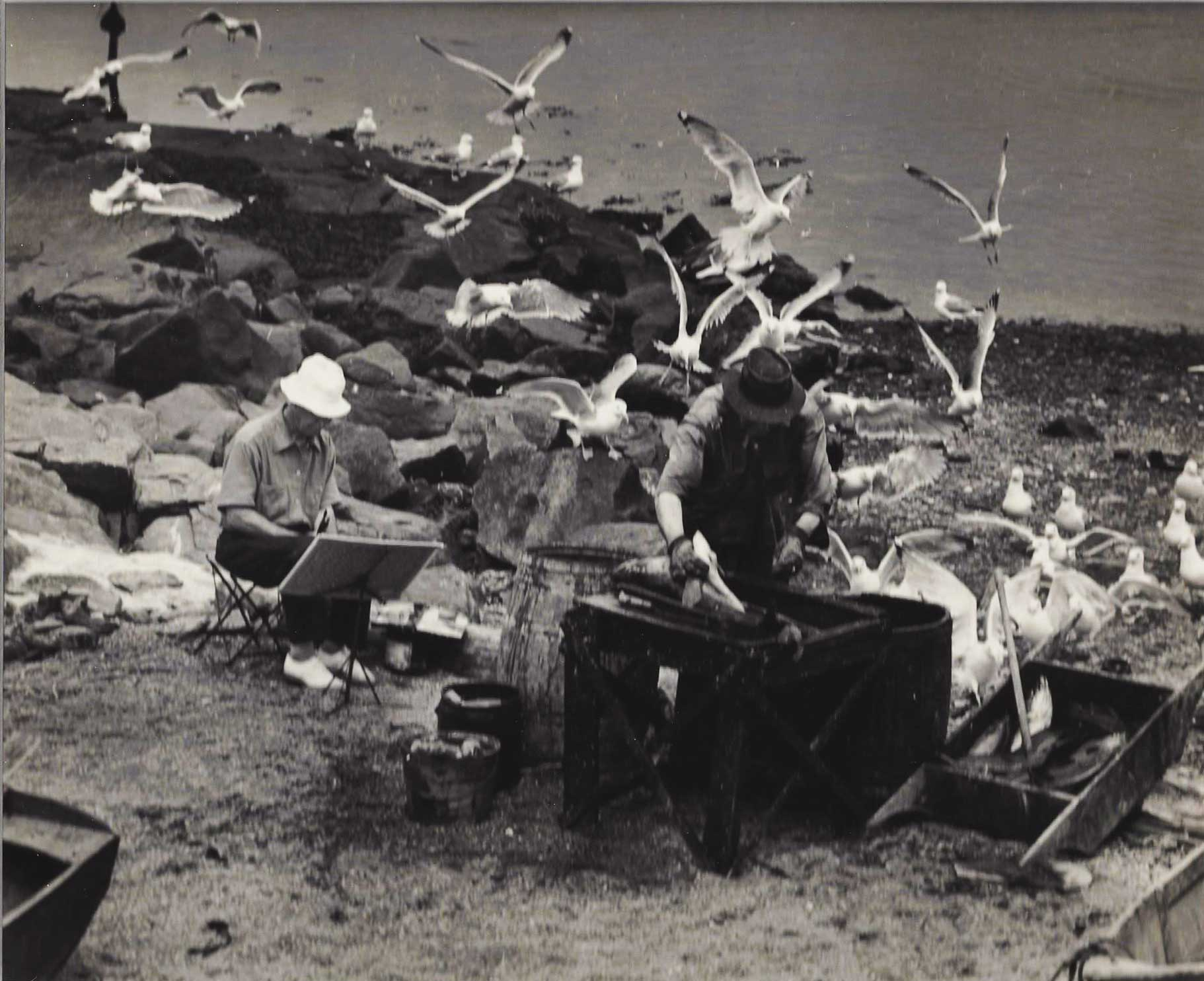
Photograph by Warner Taylor of Sears Gallagher (left) painting Frank Pierce on Fish Beach, Monhegan Island, Maine. Photograph courtesy of Anne Burr Czepiel.

Before 1900, Gallagher had eight exhibits in Boston, Providence, and Lowell: one of oil paintings and the rest watercolors and pen and ink drawings. The pace of exhibitions picked up considerably after the turn of the century, with a total of 46 between 1900 and 1929 and then tapered off to 11 between 1930 and 1939 and three in the 1940s. His exhibitions were routinely and positively reviewed in the two major art journals of the period, The Art News and American Art News, as well as in the popular press, and his work was collected by individuals and major museums. Gallagher undertook numerous commissions to illustrate books and magazines. He did a series of 40 etchings of iconic Boston buildings and landscapes that were widely distributed and followed these with series on New York, Baltimore, and Washington, D.C. Sales of his paintings and prints and his work as an illustrator earned Gallagher a steady income. He complemented this with teaching at Boston University's evening school.

== Reputation and assessment ==
Gallagher enjoyed early success, both financially and in popular response, and through the 1920s and 1930s he occupied a prominent position in the American art world, being favorably compared to artists like Woodbury, Benson, and even Winslow Homer (1836–1910).

His work was reviewed, for example, by the influential art critic Loring Holmes Dodd and included in a 1960 publication in which Dodd collected articles he had published over the years in the Worcester Evening Gazette. The collection presented Gallagher in the company of such other prominent illustrators and etchers as N.C. Wyeth, Norman Rockwell, Maxfield Parrish, and Howard Pyle.

A 2012 exhibit catalog noted Gallagher's strength as a watercolorist: “Gallagher had a proclivity for calm and peaceful places, and he rendered images that elicit the feelings evoked by his sites in the viewer. He did so by the use of flowing washes of harmonious color and by holding detail to a minimum so as to sustain unity across a pictorial surface. Avoiding strong contrasts and abrupt spatial transitions, he favored soft tonal gradations and measured distances. The influences of impressionism on his art may be seen in his frequent use of animated and summary brushwork to express transitory aspects of nature and in his tendency to incorporate the tone of his paper’s reserves in a work as means of adding the sparkle of sunlight to a scene. Overall his art is characterized by an understated restraint, as he sought to emphasize the beauty of his subjects over a display of his technical versatility."

Gallagher's reputation peaked around the time of World War II, and although he continued to paint and do etchings, by the time of his death he was rarely mentioned in academic and popular discussions of American art. In the 21st century, his work enjoyed only two exhibitions: prints at the Boston Public Library in 2007, and 34 watercolors at Spanierman Gallery in New York in 2012. Gallagher's low visibility might be explained by the very fact of his prolific output; he produced a quantity of work that may have diminished the relative value of individual paintings and earned him the label of being a "popular" artist rather than a master. It may also be that the large output necessitated repetition in subject matter and style, resulting in so many versions of similar scenes (for example, those of waves and rocks at Monhegan Island) that few attained individual recognition. Despite the wide circulation of his paintings and etchings in his lifetime and his own later work as a teacher of art, Gallagher seems not to have had a distinctive influence on other artists.

Despite his current reputation, Gallagher's work is still respected. At core, he was a draftsman and painter with the ability to show buildings, scenes, and figures. The underlying strength of his drawing is usually complemented by his brushwork and sense of color. He is called a notable American impressionist.

== Collections ==
Gallagher's works are held in the following public institutions, among others: Boston Athenaeum; Boston Public Library; Colby College Museum of Art; Farnsworth Museum; Metropolitan Museum of Art, Museum of Fine Arts, Boston; Portland Museum of Art (Maine);Harvard Art Museums; Smith College Museum; New Britain Museum of American Art; Print Club of Albany; Smithsonian American Art Museum; University of Michigan Museum of Art. The catalog accompanying an exhibit of Gallagher's watercolors at the Spanierman Gallery in 2012 lists additional collections in which his work is represented, although these have not been independently verified: the Art Institute of Chicago; New York Public Library; the Library of Congress, Washington, D.C.; the Brooklyn Museum of Art; the Los Angeles County Museum of Art; and the Bibliothèque Nationale, Paris. His work was also part of the painting event in the art competition at the 1932 Summer Olympics.
