= Giambattista Isnardi de Castello =

18th-century Italian Catholic bishop

Most Reverend Giambattista Isnardi de Castello
- Bishop of Mondovi
- Church: Catholic Church
- Diocese: Diocese of Mondovì
- In office: 1697–1732
- Predecessor: Domenico Trucchi
- Successor: Carlo Felice Sanmartino

Orders
- Ordination: 30 May 1677
- Consecration: 1 September 1697 by Bandino Panciatici

Personal details
- Born: 28 June 1651 Turin, Italy
- Died: August 1732 (age 81) Mondovì, Italy

Giambattista Isnardi de Castello (28 June 1651 – August 1732) was a Roman Catholic prelate who served as Bishop of Mondovi (1697–1732).

== Biography ==
Giambattista Isnardi de Castello was born in Turin, Italy on 28 June 1651. He was ordained a deacon on 23 May 1677 and ordained a priest on 30 May 1677. On 26 August 1697, he was appointed during the papacy of Pope Innocent XII as Bishop of Mondovi. On 1 September 1697, he was consecrated bishop by Bandino Panciatici, Cardinal-Priest of San Pancrazio, with Prospero Bottini, Titular Archbishop of Myra, and Matteo Gagliani, Bishop of Fondi, serving as co-consecrators. He served as Bishop of Mondovi until his death in August 1732.

Catholic Church titles
Preceded by Domenico Trucchi	Bishop of Mondovi; 1697–1732	Succeeded by Carlo Felice Sanmartino
