= Olimpia Savio =

Italian salon-holder and writer

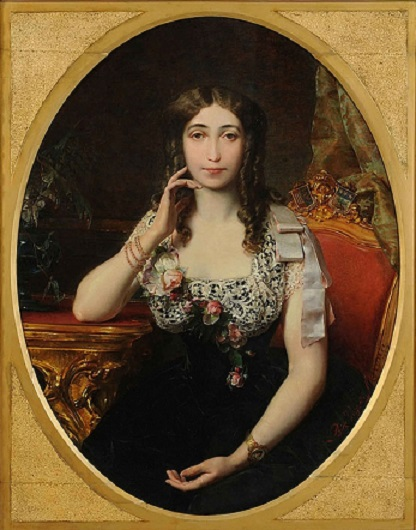
- Born: Olimpia Rossi; 22 July 1815; Turin
- Died: 2 November 1889 (aged 74); Turin
- Title: Baroness
- Spouse: Andrea Savio
- Children: 4

Olimpia Savio (22 July 1815 – 2 November 1889) was an Italian salon-holder and writer. She was considered one of the most influential women in Turin and was later recognised internationally as a patriotic mother who lost her children to an Italian nationalist cause.

== Biography ==
Savio was born Olimpia Rossi in Turin to the Ligurian nobleman Giovan Battista Rossi and his wife the Biellese Joséphine Ferrero. Her father was the director of the Royal College of the Provinces of Turin and her mother was considered among the smartest women of her time. She was educated by the Sisters of the Sacred Heart and was a debutant in 1830, at a festival for Princess Maria Cristina of Savoy.

She married the lawyer Andrea Savio with whom she had four children, Alfredo, Emilio, Federico and Adele. She was Baroness di Bernstiel. Savio hosted salons in Turin during the 19th century and wrote her memoirs leaving a portrait of her visitors and guests. The period was a turbulent time in the region and Savio left a detailed description of major events. She worked with newspapers and magazines including the "Gazzetta Piemontese", "Le Scintille", "Rivista Contemporanea" and "La Donna e la Famiglia". Savio attended the inauguration of the Turin-Genoa railway in 1854 and the inauguration of the Frejus Tunnel of 1871. Savio wrote poetry and was considered a nationalist and patriotic poet.

Her son, Alfredo, was killed during the siege of Ancona in 1860. In 1861 at the siege of Gaeta her son Emilio was killed. Savio became the personification of Our Lady of Sorrows of the Italian crown and cause. Elizabeth Barrett Browning wrote a poem, Mother and Poet, in honour and memory of her loss. Savio died in Turin and was buried in the Monumental Cemetery of Turin.

She is remembered by a road in Mirandola, a province of Modena, Italy which is called the Via Olimpia Rossi Savio.

== Bibliography ==
- La rassegnazione : statua in marmo del signor Vincenzo Vela di Milano, 1856
- Memorie della Baronessa Olimpia Savio, 1911
