= Diocese of Mondovì =

Roman Catholic diocese in Italy

Coordinates: 44.3833°N 7.8167°E

Diocese of Mondovì Dioecesis Montis Regalis in Pedemonte o Montis Vici

Catholic
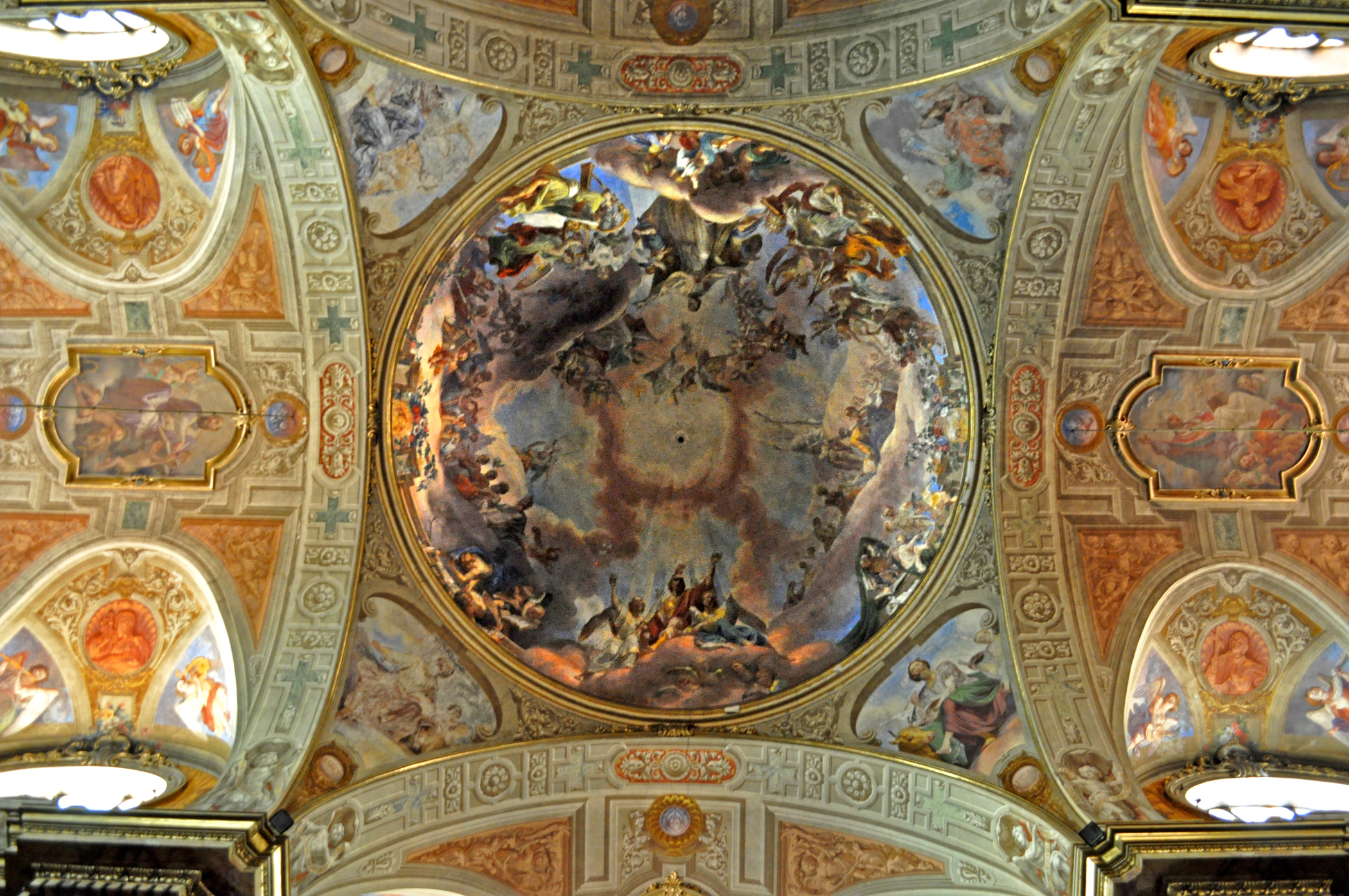
- Ceiling in Mondovì Cathedral

Location
- Country: Italy
- Ecclesiastical province: Turin

Statistics
- Area: 2,189 km^{2} (845 sq mi)
- Population: Total; Catholics: (as of 2021); 123,510 (est.); 112,640 (est.)
- Parishes: 168

Information
- Denomination: Catholic Church
- Rite: Roman Rite
- Established: 8 June 1388
- Cathedral: Mondovì Cathedral (Cattedrale di San Donato)
- Secular priests: 81 (diocesan); 10 (Religious Orders); 22 Permanent Deacons

Current leadership
- Pope: Leo XIV
- Bishop: Egidio Miragoli
- Vicar General: Flavio Begliatti
- Bishops emeritus: Luciano Pacomio

Map

Website
- www.diocesimondovi.it

The Diocese of Mondovì (Latin: Dioecesis Montis Regalis in Pedemonte o Montis Vici) is a Latin diocese of the Catholic Church in the Ecclesiastical Region of Piedmont in Italy. Its 192 parishes are divided between the Province of Savona in the (civil) region Liguria and the Province of Cuneo in the (civil) region Piedmont. The diocese is a suffragan of the Archdiocese of Turin.

== History ==
The town, then called Monsvici or Monteregale, was a part of the diocese of Asti until 1198, when it established itself as a commune. The commune had a podestà.

The diocese of Mondovi was established during the Great Schism by Pope Urban VI of the Roman Obedience, in the papal Bull, Salvator Noster of 8 June 1388. On 26 June 1388, he established Mondovi as a civitas. The city of Mondovì provided the bishop with an episcopal palace, next to the church of S. Antonio.

The first bishop of Mondovì was the Dominican Damiano Zavaglia; among his successors were Percivallo di Palma (1429), Amadeo Romagnano (1497), who reconstructed the cathedral (1550); Michele Ghislieri, O.P. (1550), Grand Inquisitor and later Pope Pius V; Cardinal Vincenzo Lauro (1566), founder of the seminary, during whose incumbency the cathedral and other churches were torn down to make room for the citadel; Giovanni Battista Isnardi (1697), who restored the episcopal palace and the church of St. Dalmazaio; Carlo Felice Sanmartino (1741), founder of the new seminary, and Giovanni Tommaso Ghilardi, O.P. (1842).

The city, at first part of the Diocese of Asti, became the seat of a bishop, suffragan of the Archbishop of Milan, but, since 1515, the Archdiocese of Turin has been its metropolitan. In 1817, the territory of Cuneo was detached from the See of Mondovì, making the diocese of Cuneo.

=== Cathedral and Chapter ===
The Cathedral of Mondovi is dedicated to S. Donato. In the bull in which he created the diocese, Pope Urban VI says that he promotes the Collegiate Church of S. Donato into a cathedral church. The cathedral was served by a Chapter, which, as Pope Urban says, is to have the same dignities with the same names as that of Asti, and ten canons with the same titles as those of the Chapter of Asti. The Chapter of Mondovì was made up of four dignities (the Archdeacon, the Archpriest, the Provost, and the Cantor) and eight Canons. There were also sixteen Chaplains. The Pope, unfortunately, makes no mention of how the dignities and Canons are to be appointed or by whom. It is known that the first two bishops installed no Canons. Statutes of the Cathedral Chapter of Mondovì were approved by the Chapter on 23 September 1480, and ratified by the Archdeacon of Turin, Guillermo Caccia, JUD and Protonotary Apostolic, the Apostolic Delegate.

In 1577, Duke Emmanuel Philibert, faced with the need to fortify the city of Mondovì, announced that he needed the hilltop on which the Cathedral church of S. Donato had existed for many centuries. His plans also required the demolition of the churches of San Domenico (which belonged to the Dominican friars) and Sant'Antonio (which belonged to the Jesuits. After consultations with the Papal Nuncio in Turin, Gerolamo de'Federici, and all the parties concerned in Mondovì (the Bishop, Vincenzo Lauro, the Cathedral Chapter, and all of the religious orders), the plan was submitted to Pope Gregory XIII to transfer the seat of the bishop from S. Donato to the Franciscan church of San Francesco, and to move the Franciscans to Sant'Andrea. The Dominicans would be assigned the parish church of Carassone which had the title of San Giovanni di Lupazano. The Jesuits would be moved to the palazzo of Francesco da Ponte. On 15 March 1577 the Pope gave his consent, and the church of San Francesco became the Cathedral of Mondovì, under the title of S. Donato. The Franciscans were authorized to build a new church of San Francesco. Bishop Lauro succeeded Bishop Gerolamo de'Federici as Papal Nuncio in Turin, and was made a cardinal by Gregory XIII in 1583.

In 1835, the Chapter was made up of six dignities and fourteen Canons. The dignities were: Archdeacon, Archpriest, Provost, Cantor, Penitentiary and Theologus. The Canon Penitentiarius and the Canon Theologus were added by Bishop Vincenzo Lauro in 1580 and 1584.

The cathedral contains paintings by Giulio Romano, Cambiaso, and others. The residence of the bishop is one of the most impressive episcopal palaces in Italy. In the church of la Missione there are frescoes by the Jesuit Andrea Pozzo.

Outside the city is the sanctuary of the Madonna del Pilone, dating from the fourteenth century, but finished later (1730–49). The palace of the counts of San Quintino contained the first printing-office in Piedmont, and was the seat of a university (1560–1719) founded by Duke Emmanuel Philibert, the first institution of its kind in Piedmont.

=== Diocesan synods ===
A diocesan synod was an irregularly held, but important, meeting of the bishop of a diocese and his clergy. Its purpose was (1) to proclaim generally the various decrees already issued by the bishop; (2) to discuss and ratify measures on which the bishop chose to consult with his clergy; (3) to publish statutes and decrees of the diocesan synod, of the provincial synod, and of the Holy See.

Bishop Gerolamo Calagrano (1490–1497) held a diocesan synod in 1495, the statutes of which were published. In 1573 Bishop Vincenzo Lauro presided at a diocesan synod. On 15 September 1592 Bishop Giovanni Antonio Castruccio (1590–1602) held his second diocesan synod, and had the Statutes published. Bishop Michele Casale held a diocesan synod in Mondovi on 1—3 September 1763. Bishop Placido Pozzi held a diocesan synod on 16—18 September 1879.

The diocesan Seminary was built by Bishop Vincenzo Lauro in 1573, and rebuilt by Bishop Carlo Felice Sammartino in 1742.

== Bishops ==
=== 1388 to 1600 ===
- Damiano Zavaglia, O.P. (1388–1403 Died)
- Giovanni de Soglio, O.M. (1403–1413)
- Franceschino Fauzone (1413–1424)
- Jacobus de Ayresta (1425–1429)
- Guido de Ripa, C.R.S.A. (1429)
- Percivallo de Balma (1429–1438)
- Aimerico Segaudi, C.R.S.A. (1438–1470 Died)
- Antonio Fieschi (1470–1484 Died)
- Antoine Campione (1484–1490)
- Gerolamo Calagrano (1490–1497)
- Amedeo di Romagnano (1497–1509)
- Carlo Roero (1509–1512)

29 October 1511: Territory Lost to form the Diocese of Saluzzo

- Lorenzo Fieschi (1512–1519)
- Ottobono Fieschi (1519–1522)
- Urbano de Miolano (1523–1523)
- Carlo Lodovico dei Conti della Chiambra (1523–1551)
- Bartolomeo Pipero(1551–1559)
- Antonio Ghislieri, O.P. (1560–1566 Elected, Pope)
- Vincenzo Lauro (1566–1587 Resigned)
- Felice Bertolano (1587)
- Giovanni Antonio Castruccio (1590–1602)

=== 1600 to 1800 ===
- Carlo Argentero (1603–1630)
- Carlo Antonio Ripa (1632–1641)
- Maurizio Solaro di Moretta (1642–1655)
- Michele Beggiamo (1656–1662)
- Giacinto Solaro di Moretta (1663–1667 Resigned)
- Domenico Trucchi (1667–1697 Resigned)
- Giambattista Isnardi de Castello (1697–1732 Died)

Sede vacante (1732–1741)

- Carlo Felice Sanmartino (1741–1753)
- Michele Casati, C.R. (1754–1782 Died)

3 September 1768: Territory gained from the Diocese of Asti

- Giuseppe Maria Corte (1783–1800)

=== since 1800 ===
- Giovanni Battista Pio Vitale (1805–1821)

17 July 1817: Territory Lost to form the Diocese of Cuneo

- Francesco Gaetano Buglioni (Bullione di Monale) (1824–1842)
- Giovanni Tommaso Ghilardi, O.P. (1842–1873)
- Placido Pozzi (1873–1897 Died)
- Giovanni Battista Ressia (1897–1932 Retired)
- Sebastiano Briacca (1932–1963 Died)
- Carlo Maccari (1963–1968 Appointed, Archbishop of Ancona e Numana)
- Francesco Brustia (1970–1975 Died)
- Massimo Giustetti (1975–1986 Appointed, Bishop of Biella)
- Enrico Masseroni (1987–1996 Appointed, Archbishop of Vercelli)
- Luciano Pacomio (3 Dec 1996–29 Sep 2017, retired)
- Egidio Miragoli (29 Sep 2017–)

== Parishes ==
The Diocese of Mondovì maintains two lists of the parishes in the diocese, one arranged according to diocesan subdivisions, Le unità pastorale, the other giving pastoral assignments of clergy for the current five-year period.

== See also ==
- Catholic Church in Italy

== Bibliography ==
- Bibliografia su Mondovì ed elenco dei libri ivi stampati (in Italian)

=== Reference works ===
- Gams, Pius Bonifatius (1873). Series episcoporum Ecclesiae catholicae: quotquot innotuerunt a beato Petro apostolo. Ratisbon: Typis et Sumptibus Georgii Josephi Manz. p. 819. (in Latin)
- Eubel, Conradus, ed. (1913). Hierarchia catholica. Vol. Tomus 1 (second ed.). Münster: Libreria Regensbergiana. (in Latin) [Eubel was unacquainted with local Piedmontese documents, and is frequently unreliable]
- Eubel, Conradus, ed. (1914). Hierarchia catholica. Vol. Tomus 2 (second ed.). Münster: Libreria Regensbergiana. (in Latin)
- Eubel, Conradus; Gulik, Guilelmus, eds. (1923). Hierarchia catholica. Vol. Tomus 3 (second ed.). Münster: Libreria Regensbergiana. (in Latin)
- Gauchat, Patritius (Patrice) (1935). Hierarchia catholica. Vol. Tomus IV (1592-1667). Münster: Libraria Regensbergiana. (in Latin)
- Ritzler, Remigius; Sefrin, Pirminus (1952). Hierarchia catholica medii et recentis aevi V (1667-1730). Patavii: Messagero di S. Antonio.
- Ritzler, Remigius; Sefrin, Pirminus (1958). Hierarchia catholica medii et recentis aevi. Vol. Tomus VI (1730-1799). Patavii: Messagero di S. Antonio. (in Latin)
- Ritzler, Remigius; Sefrin, Pirminus (1968). Hierarchia Catholica medii et recentioris aevi sive summorum pontificum, S. R. E. cardinalium, ecclesiarum antistitum series... A pontificatu Pii PP. VII (1800) usque ad pontificatum Gregorii PP. XVI (1846) (in Latin). Vol. VII. Monasterii: Libr. Regensburgiana.
- Remigius Ritzler; Pirminus Sefrin (1978). Hierarchia catholica Medii et recentioris aevi... A Pontificatu PII PP. IX (1846) usque ad Pontificatum Leonis PP. XIII (1903) (in Latin). Vol. VIII. Il Messaggero di S. Antonio.
- Pięta, Zenon (2002). Hierarchia catholica medii et recentioris aevi... A pontificatu Pii PP. X (1903) usque ad pontificatum Benedictii PP. XV (1922) (in Latin). Vol. IX. Padua: Messagero di San Antonio. ISBN 978-88-250-1000-8.
- Statistica del clero della Diocesi di Mondovì pubblicata per ordine ... fr. Giovanni Tommaso Ghilardi dei Predicatori l'anno 1853 (in Italian). Mondovi: presso Pietro Rossi. 1853.

=== Studies ===
- Bima, Palemone Luigi (1842). Serie cronologica dei romani pontefici e degli arcivescovi e vescovi di tutti gli stati di Terraferma & S. S. B. M. e di alcune del regno di Sardegna (in Italian) (seconda ed.). Torino: Favale.
- Cappelletti, Giuseppe (1838). Le chiese d'Italia della loro origine sino ai nostri giorni (in Italian). Vol. decimoquarto (14). Venezia: Giuseppe Antonelli. pp. 203–263.
- Gioffredo, Pietro (1839). Storia delle Alpi marittime (in Italian). Vol. IV. Torino: Stamperia Reale. Gioffredo, Pietro (1839). Vol. V. Gioffredo, Pietro (1839). Vol. VI.
- Grassi, Gioachino (1789). Memorie istoriche della chiesa vescovile di Monteregale in Piemonte (in Italian). Vol. Tom. I. Torino: Stamperia reale. Grassi, Gioachino (1789). Tom. II: Documenti.
- Mellano, María Franca (1955). La controriforma nella diocesi di Mondovì (1560-1602) (in Italian). Impronta.
- Morozzo della Rocca, Emanuele (1899). Le storie dell' antica città del Monteregale ora Mondovì in Piemonte (in Italian). Vol. secondo. Mondovi: tip. C.A. Fracchia.
- Ughelli, Ferdinando; Coleti, Niccolo (1719). Italia sacra, sive de episcopis Italiae et insularum adjacentium (in Latin). Vol. Tomus quartus (4) (2nd ed.). Venice: Apud Sebastianum Coleti. pp. 1084–1096.

==== External links ====
Herbermann, Charles, ed. (1913). "Mondovi". Catholic Encyclopedia. New York: Robert Appleton Company.
