= San Carlo Borromeo, Turin =

Church of San Carlo Borromeo
- Chiesa di San Carlo Borromeo
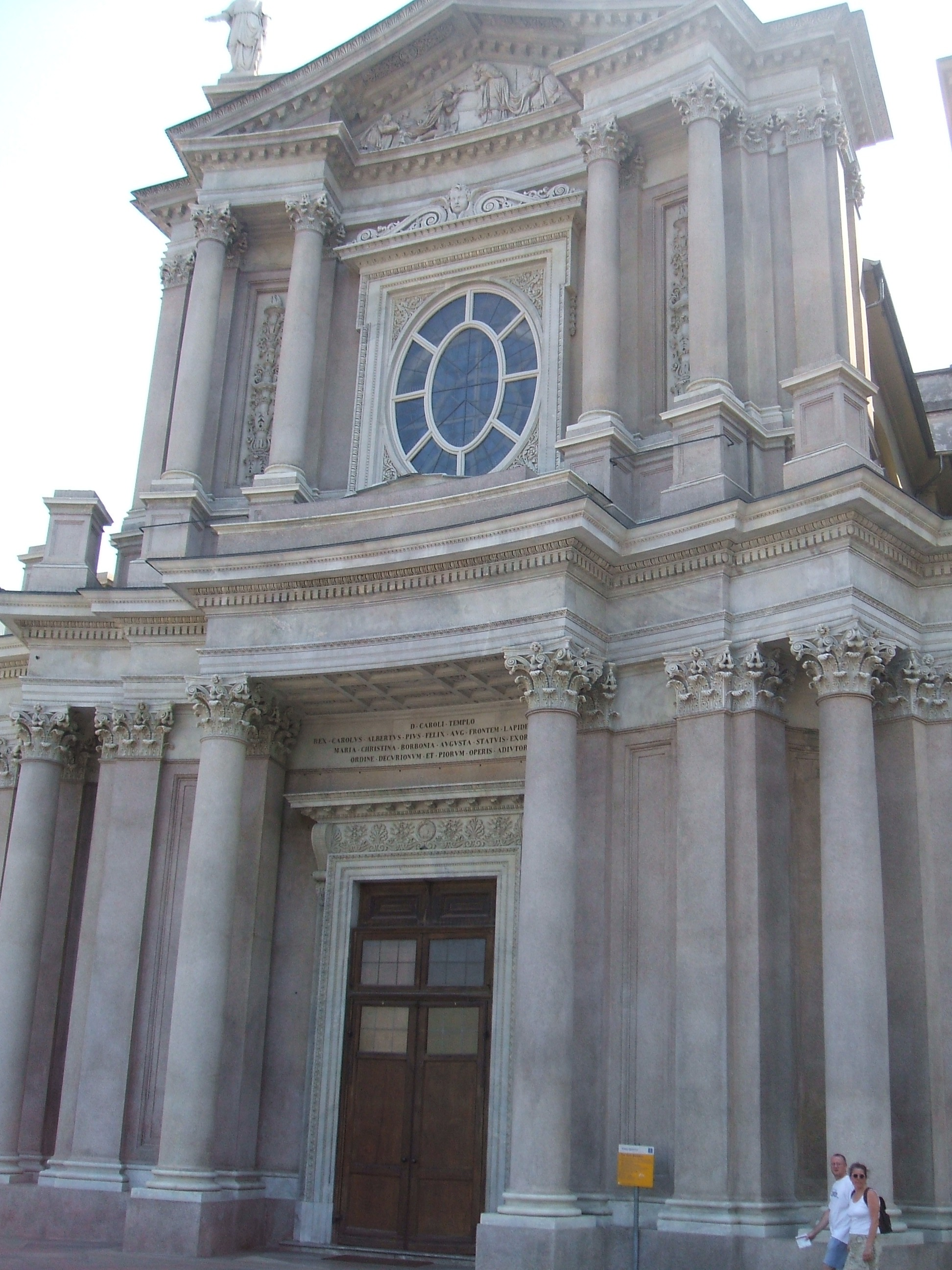
- Façade of the church

- Map of Turin
- 45.06698°N 7.68182°E
- Country: Italy
- Denomination: Roman Catholic Church

Architecture
- Style: Baroque
- Groundbreaking: 1619
- Completed: 1834

Administration
- Archdiocese: Turin

San Carlo Borromeo or San Carlo is a Baroque style, Roman Catholic church located in Turin, region of Piedmont, Italy. It mirrors the adjacent church of Santa Cristina and faces the Piazza San Carlo. The arrangement recalls the twin churches (chiese gemelle) of Santa Maria dei Miracoli (1681) and Santa Maria in Montesanto (1679) facing the Piazza del Popolo in Rome.

== History ==
The church was commissioned in 1619 by Charles Emmanuel I, Duke of Savoy, who had met the archbishop, and later saint, after which the church is named. The main designer is uncertain; the work has been attributed to both Baron Maurizio Valperga, and the engineer Galleani di Ventimiglia. The first facade was designed in 1830 to designs of Grassi. The facade bas-relief depicting San Carlo granting communion to Duke Emanuele Filiberto was sculpted by Stefano Butti.

The main altar dates from 1653. Above the marble main altar is a painting depicting St Charles genuflects before the Sindone of Turin by Pier Francesco Mazzucchelli, also called il Morazzone. In 1866, the painter Rodolfo Morgari frescoed the walls and ceiling.

The church is located at the southwest end of the piazza San Carlo, where also is located the palace where Count Vittorio Alfieri wrote his first tragedic dramas.
