= Mondovì Cathedral =

Church building in Mondovì, Italy

Coordinates: 44.3898°N 7.8293°E

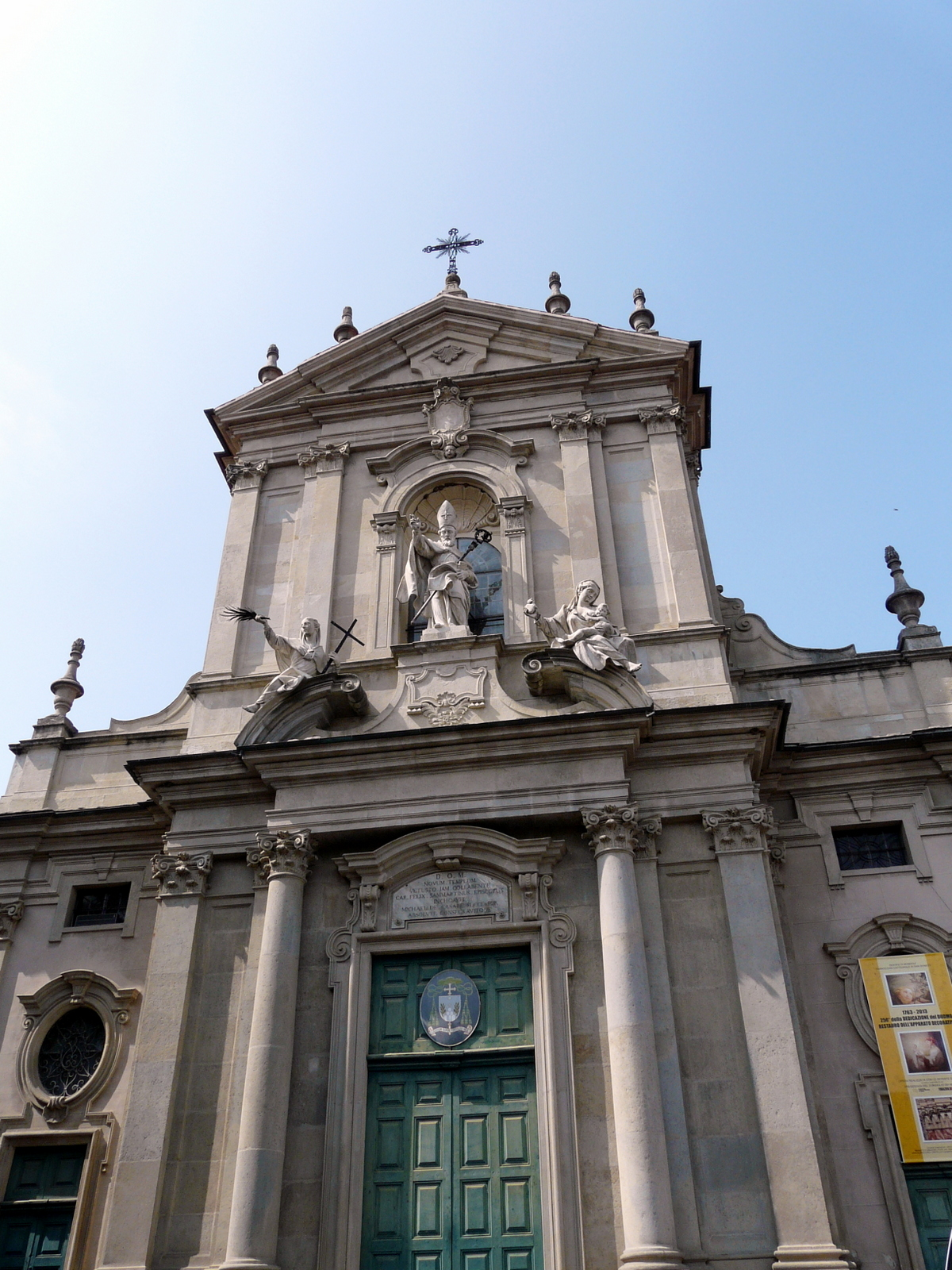
West front of the cathedral

Mondovì Cathedral (Italian: Cattedrale di Mondovi; Cattedrale di San Donato) is a Roman Catholic cathedral in Mondovì, Province of Cuneo, Piedmont, northern Italy, dedicated to Saint Donatus of Arezzo. It is the seat of the bishops of Mondovì.

== History and description ==
Several buildings were used over the centuries for the cathedral of the diocese. The first was the pieve of San Donato (12th century), which was replaced at the beginning of the 16th century by a new Renaissance church, which was demolished by order of Emmanuel Philibert, Duke of Savoy, in 1574. The church of San Francesco was then declared the cathedral, to be replaced in its turn by the present one, which was built between 1743 and 1753 to designs by the architect Francesco Gallo, and consecrated ten years later by Bishop Michele Casati.

The cathedral is well-supplied with works of art, many of them from its predecessor buildings. Among them are the altar of the Renaissance church (1507), now kept in the chapter room; an ancient bust of Pope Pius V donated by Pope Pius XI in 1872; and various paintings of the 17th and 18th centuries by Piedmontese and Lombard artists. The painted decorations and the stucco work were executed in the mid-19th century. The presbytery and the main altar are decorated with large frescoes: in the apse is the Martyrdom of San Donato by Paolo Emilio Morgari; in the cupola the Glorification of Saint Pius V; in the presbytery the Coronation of the Virgin. The Chapel of Suffrage is a very fine example of the Rococo style of the 18th century, with an alabaster crucifix of the end of that century.

== See also ==
- Roman Catholic Diocese of Mondovì
