= Pandino =

Pandino Pandì (Lombard)
- Comune
- Comune di Pandino
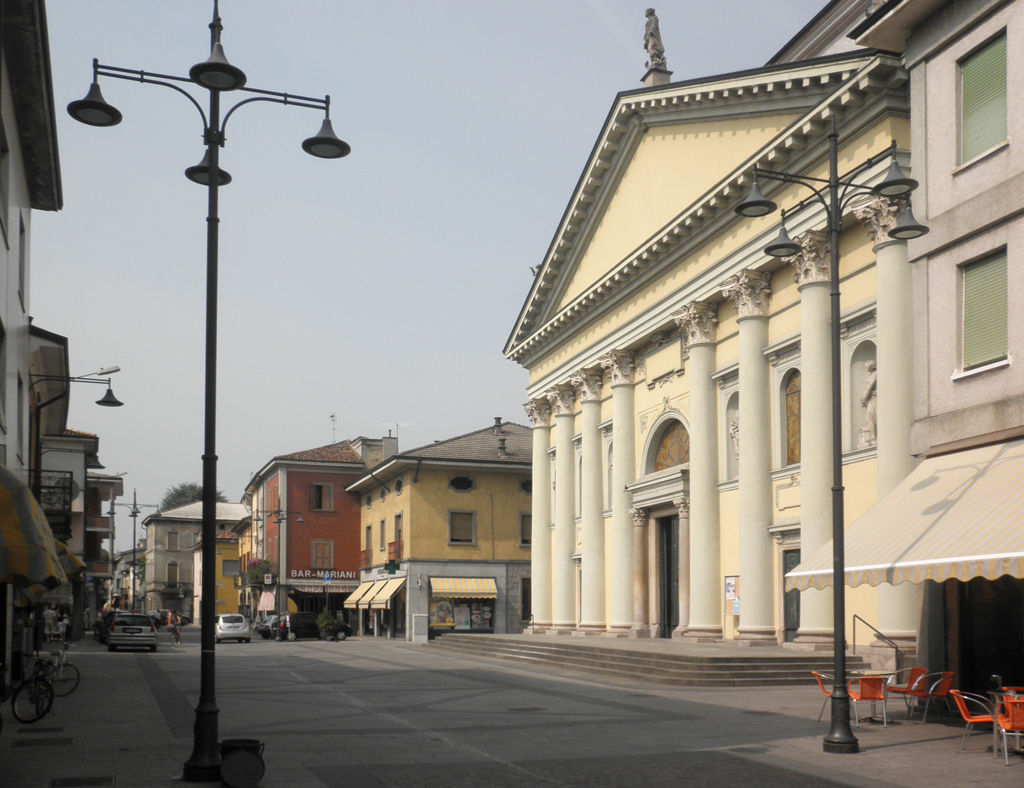

- Flag Coat of arms

- Location within Italy Location within Lombardy
- Coordinates: 45°24′N 9°33′E
- Country: Italy
- Region: Lombardy
- Province: Cremona (CR)
- Frazioni: Gradella, Nosadello

Government
  - Mayor: Maria Luise Polig

Area
  - Total: 22.2 km^{2} (8.6 sq mi)
- Elevation: 85 m (279 ft)

Population (31 December 2017)
  - Total: 9,035
  - Density: 407/km^{2} (1,050/sq mi)
- Demonym: Pandinesi
- Time zone: UTC+1 (CET)
  - Summer (DST): UTC+2 (CEST)
- Postal code: 26025
- Dialing code: 0373
- Website: Official website

Pandino (Cremasco: Pandì) is a comune (municipality) in the Province of Cremona in the Italian region Lombardy, located about 30 kilometres (19 mi) east of Milan and about 50 kilometres (31 mi) northwest of Cremona.

Pandino borders the following municipalities: Agnadello, Dovera, Monte Cremasco, Palazzo Pignano, Rivolta d'Adda, Spino d'Adda. The Castello Visconteo, built by Bernabò Visconti around 1355 as a hunting residence, stands near the center of town.

The scene in the film Call Me By Your Name where Elio conveys his feelings for Oliver was shot in a single take at the war memorial in Piazza Vittorio Emanuele. Scenes were also shot outside Visconti Castle.

== Twin towns ==
Pandino is twinned with:

- Saint-Denis-en-Val, France, since 2001
