= Beatrice Morgari =

Italian painter (1858–1936)

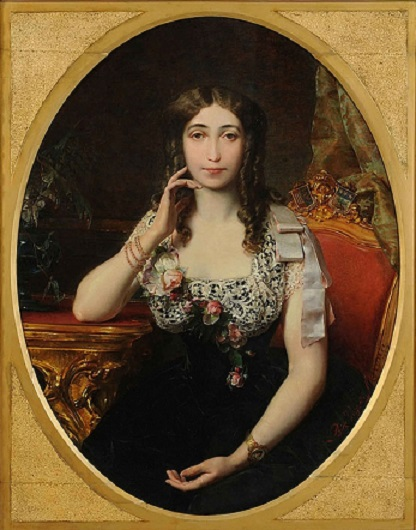
Portrait of the writer, Olimpia Savio

Beatrice Morgari Vezzetti (Turin, 1858–1936) was an Italian painter, mainly of genre subjects, often depicting intimate family scenes.

She was born into a family of painters including her uncle Rodolfo Morgari, who was professor at the Accademia Albertina. Her father was Paolo Emilio Morgari. Her brother Luigi Morgari was also a painter. She exhibited in 1880 at Turin: Curiosetta and a design for a tapestry.
