= Tommaso Juglaris =

Italian painter

Tommaso Juglaris (c. 1844 – 16 January 1925) was an Italian painter active mostly in the United States, based in New England, during the late 19th and early decades of the 20th century.

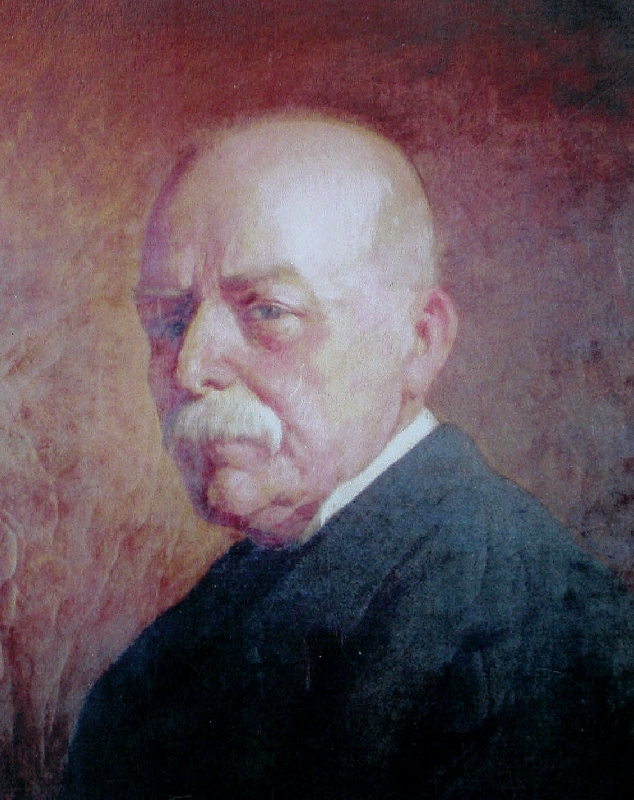
Self-portrait of Tommaso Juglaris (1921)

== Biography ==
Tommaso was born in Moncalieri and attended the Accademia Albertina from 1859 until 1862, working under Clementina Morgari Lomazzi. Working for a few years in various fresco projects, in 1871, he travelled to Paris to work under Thomas Couture. In 1880, he was offered a position with Louis Prang and Company, who utilized him as a designer of holiday cards. After six months, he sought other positions. By 1882 he was an instructor at the Boston Art Club. He later also taught at the Rhode Island School of Design. Among his pupils were Childe Hassam, A.W. Buhler and Sears Gallagher.

He participated in major decorative projects including frescoes of the Muses (1886) on the dome of the Michigan State Capitol in Lansing. He was commissioned to paint the portrait of First Lady Frances Folsom Cleveland and to decorate a number of churches and residences in Boston.

His work "Madmoiselle Yvonne" was once at the Locke-Ober Restaurant in Boston. He also executed the largest mural cycle then extant in United States, Grecian Festival for the public library in Franklin, Massachusetts.

He died in Moncalieri.
