= Luigi Morgari =

Italian painter (1857–1935)

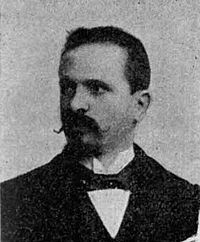
Luigi Morgari (date unknown)

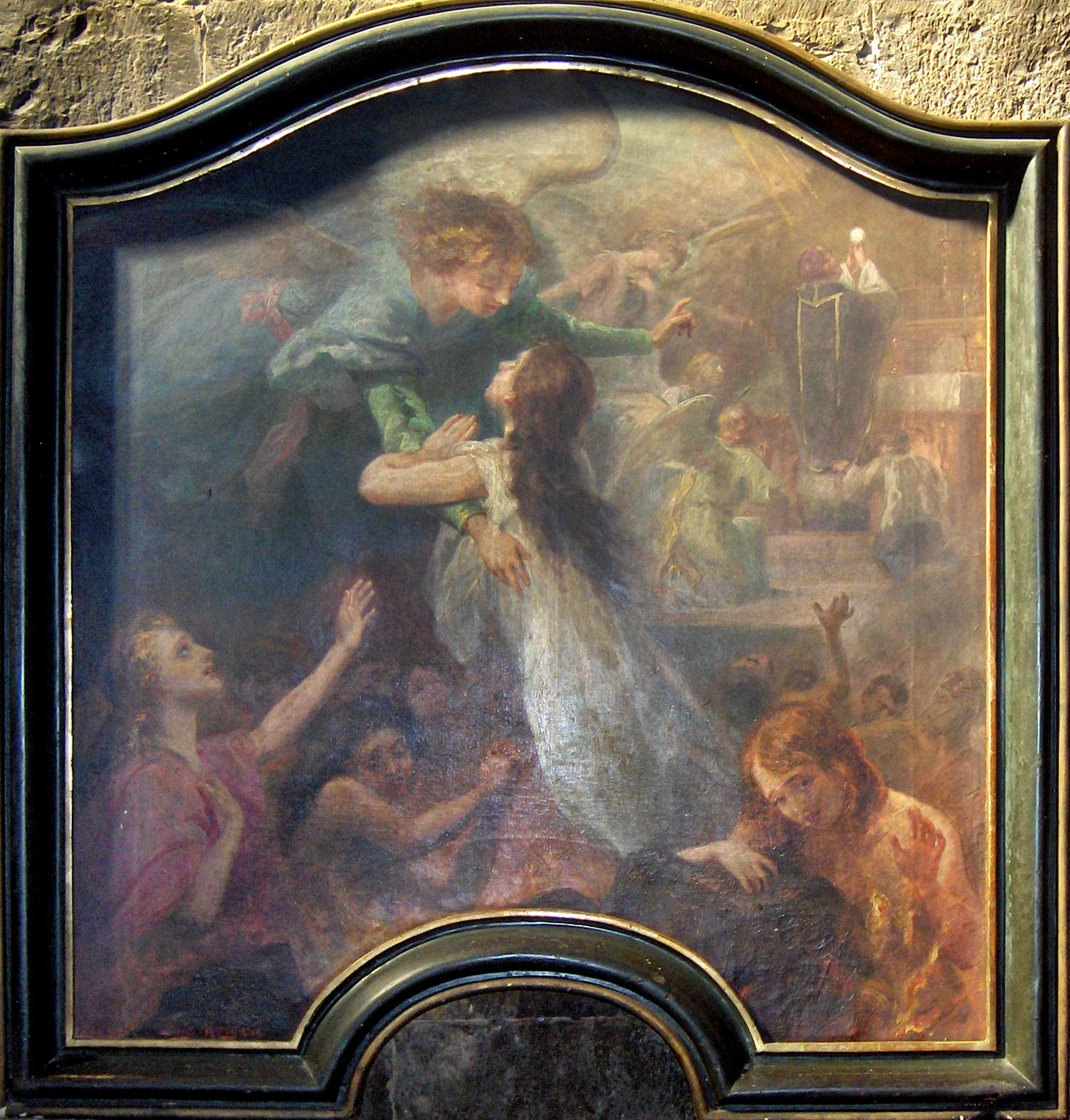
The Souls of Purgatory from the Cathedral of Saint Syrus in Sanremo

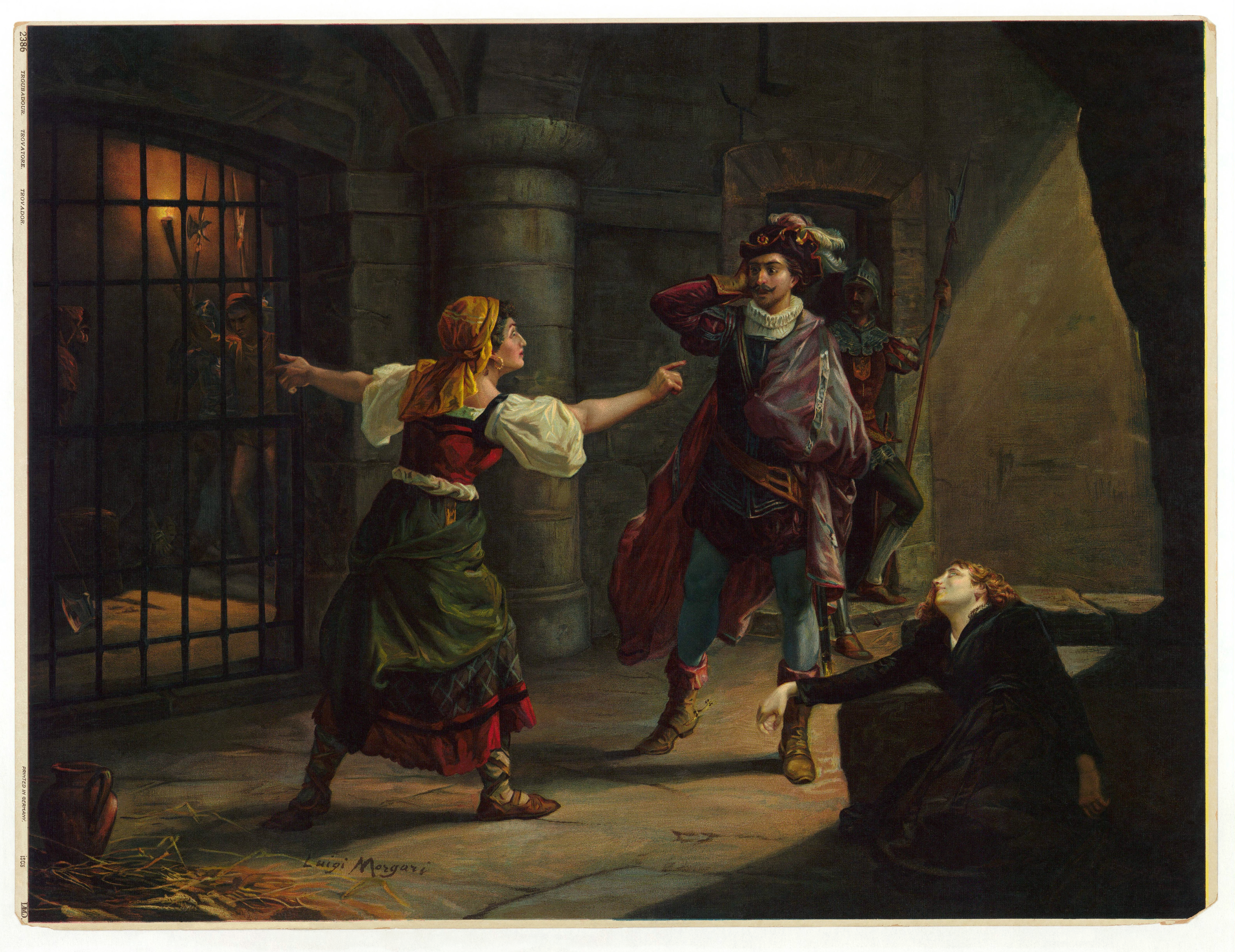
Poster for Il trovatore

Luigi Morgari (1857–1935) was an Italian painter, primarily of frescoes on religious themes.

== Biography ==
He was born to a family of artists. His first studies were with his father Paolo Emilio, then he was a student of Enrico Gamba and Andrea Gastaldi at the Accademia Albertina. For many years, he worked with his father and uncle, Rodolfo, also a well-known painter, to create decorative works, mostly of a religious nature, which was the principal activity of the Morgari family.

He was primarily a fresco painter. His numerous works may be found at the sanctuaries in Bussana and Rho, Alessandria Cathedral, the Church of the Archangel Michael in Olevano di Lomellina, the palazzo of the Quartana family in Genoa and the Church of Saint Syrus in Lomazzo.

In 1919, he completed a large project at the Church of the Trinity in Pandino; including a cycle of frescoes dedicated to Saint Bassianus of Lodi, with side panels of Saint Eurosia and Our Lady of the Rosary.

Some of his best-known works, however, are among his last. These include frescoes in the Parochial Church of Cortazzone, featuring a vault with Saint Secundus of Asti riding a horse, created from 1922 to 1923; and a large cycle at the Basilica di San Nicolò in Lecco, dating from 1925 to 1928. He also painted the walls and counter-façade of the church of Santi Donato e Carpoforo, Novedrate.

His sister, Beatrice (1858–1936), was also a well-known painter.
