= Oddino Morgari =

Italian socialist journalist and politician

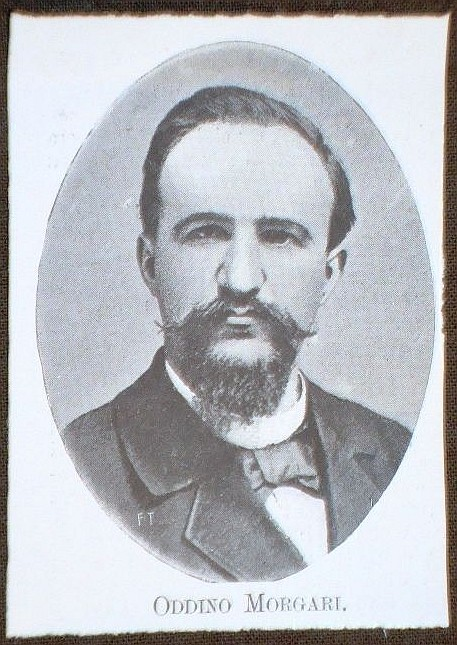
- Morgari in 1904

Member of Chamber of Deputies
- In office 5 April 1897 – 9 November 1926
- Constituency: Turin

Personal details
- Born: 16 November 1865 Turin, Kingdom of Italy
- Died: 24 November 1944 (aged 79) Sanremo, Italian Social Republic
- Party: PSI (1892–1922; 1930–1944); PSU (1922–1930)
- Occupation: Journalist, politician

Oddino Morgari (16 November 1865 – 24 November 1944) was an Italian socialist journalist and politician. He was a member of the Chamber of Deputies from 1897 to 1926.

== Early life ==
Initially a Mazzinian radical, he became a member of the Italian Socialist Party (PSI) in 1891, and was elected leader of its local section in Turin the following year. He began writing for ''La parola del Povero, the supplement of Grido del Popolo, the beginning of a career which brought him to the leadership of Avanti! in 1908, proving himself to be an advocate of incipient Social democracy (a reformist and pacifist).

== Prominence ==
In 1911, Morgari inaugurated his activity as a "diplomat of Socialism" with a trip to the Far East, which would become his main preoccupation in the years of World War I; he took part in preparing the Zimmerwald Conference, celebrated the October Revolution and Bolshevist Russia, and signed the 1 April 1919 letter that declared the PSI adherence to the Comintern. Nevertheless, he remained inside the PSI when its Bolshevik factions left to form the Italian Communist Party.

He left the party in 1922 to join Filippo Turati and Claudio Treves in creating the Unitary Socialist Party (PSU). With Fascism and the March on Rome came a debate among socialists over the conflict and pacifism: in 1934, Morgari showed himself to be a partisan of an understanding with the Soviet Union, and called for defeatism to be applied as a revolutionary tactic in case Italy was to be led into war by Benito Mussolini. As the PSU re-entered the PSI in 1930, he became a member of the PSI Executive Committee in 1939 (together with Angelo Tasca and Giuseppe Saragat), as well as editor-in-chief of Avanti!.
