= Plura (disambiguation) =

The pleural cavity is the potential space between the pleurae of the pleural sac that surrounds each lung.

Plura may also refer to:

- Plura (river), in Rana, Nordland county, Norway
- Plura Jonsson (born 1951), Swedish musician and author known by the mononym Plura
- Carlo Giuseppe Plura (1663–1737), Swiss-Italian stucco artist
- Joseph Plura the Elder (died 1756), Italian sculptor
- Joseph Plura the Younger (c. 1777–1786), English sculptor of Italian descent
- Marek Plura (1970–2023), Polish politician

== See also ==
- Pleura
- Plural
