= Mondovì =

Mondovì Ël Mondvì (Piedmontese)
- Comune
- Città di Mondovì
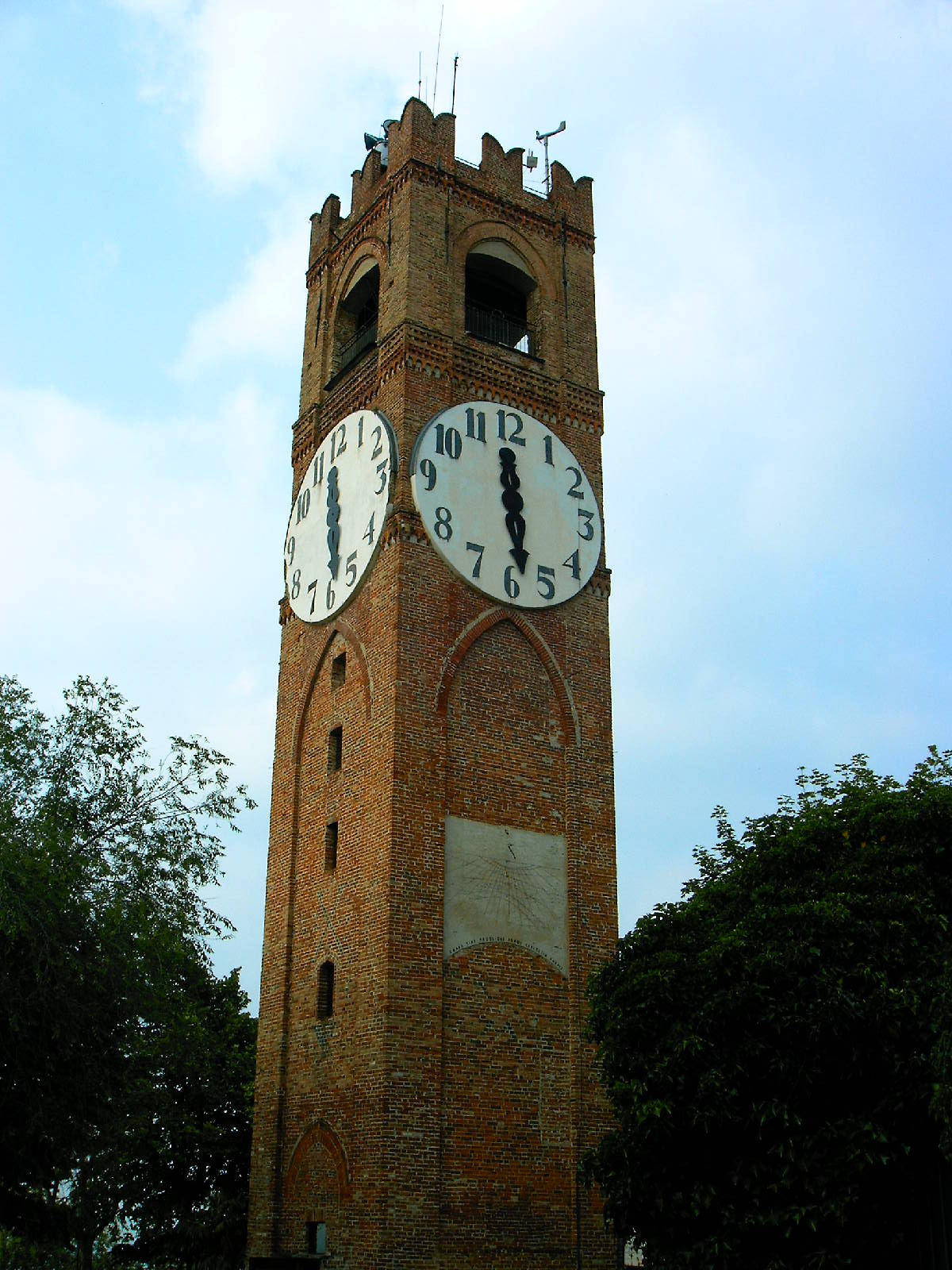
- Belvedere Tower

- Coat of arms

- Location within Italy Location within Piedmont
- Coordinates: 44°23′20″N 7°49′5″E
- Country: Italy
- Region: Piedmont
- Province: Cuneo (CN)
- Frazioni: Breolungi; Gratteria; Merlo; Pascomonti; Pogliola; Rifreddo; San Biagio; San Giovanni dei Govoni; San Quintino

Government
  - Mayor: Luca Robaldo

Area
  - Total: 87 km^{2} (34 sq mi)
- Elevation: 395 m (1,296 ft)

Population (31 October 2017)
  - Total: 22,426
  - Density: 260/km^{2} (670/sq mi)
- Demonym: Monregalesi (rarer Mondoviti)
- Time zone: UTC+1 (CET)
  - Summer (DST): UTC+2 (CEST)
- Postal code: 12084
- Dialing code: 0174
- Patron saint: St. Donatus
- Saint day: 30 October
- Website: www.comune.mondovi.cn.it

Mondovì (Italian: [mondoˈvi]; Piedmontese: Ël Mondvì [əl mʊŋdˈvi]; Latin: Mons Regalis) is a town and comune (municipality) in Piedmont, northern Italy, located about 22 kilometres (14 mi) east of Cuneo, in which province it lies, and 80 kilometres (50 mi) south of the regional capital, Turin. The area around the town is known as the Monregalese.

Mondovì, located on the Monte Regale hill, is divided into several rioni (ancient quarters): Piazza (the most ancient), Breo, Pian della Valle, Carassone, Altipiano, Borgato and Rinchiuso; the latter, situated lower next to the Ellero stream, developed from the 18th century in conjunction with the industrial development of the town, when it started to be reached by railway. The Funicolare di Mondovì, a funicular railway reopened in 2006, links Breo with Piazza.

Mondovì is the seat of the Roman Catholic Diocese of Mondovì.

== History ==
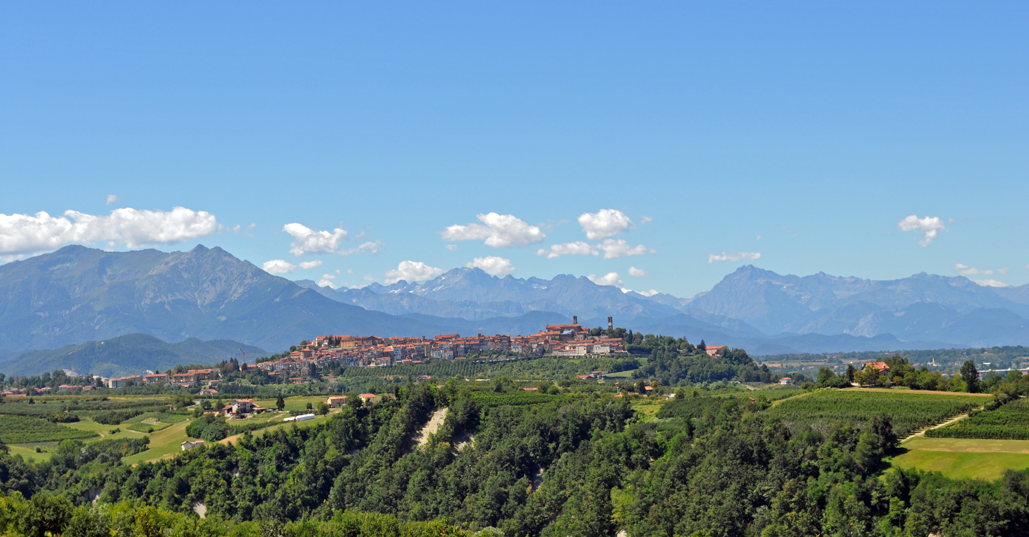
Mondovì

Founded on a hilltop in 1198 by survivors of the destroyed village of Bredolo and by inhabitants of the neighboring villages of Vico (now Vicoforte), Vasco (now Monastero di Vasco) and Carassone (which was abandoned after the founding of the new city): an independent comune named Ël Mont ëd Vi, meaning "The Mount of Vico" in Piedmontese, was formed.

Their independence proved to be short-lived because the bishop of Asti and the marquis of Ceva stormed it in 1200 and destroyed it in 1231. The commune resisted, however, and the following year it was able to sustain another attack from Asti. In 1260 it was occupied by Charles I of Anjou (then King of Naples and one of the most powerful landlords in Provence and north-western Italy), while in 1274 it returned under the bishops of Asti. In 1290 he was however able to buy back its communal independence, under the new name of Mons Regalis ("Royal Mount") due to its large privileges. In 1305 it fell again under the Angevins, followed by the Visconti, the Marquisate of Montferrat, the Acaja and, from 1418, the House of Savoy.

Mondovì continued to grow until the 16th century when it was the largest city in Piedmont. In 1537 it was occupied by France, under which it mostly remained until 1559. In 1560, Emmanuel Philibert, Duke of Savoy restored it to Piedmont, which held it until the Italian unification, apart from the Napoleonic period (1796–1814).

Piedmont's first printing press was created in Mondovì in 1472. From 1560 to 1566, Mondovì was the seat of Piedmont's first university.

== Music ==
It is home of the Academia Montis Regalis orchestra led by conductor Alessandro De Marchi.

== Main sights ==
- Church of San Francesco Saverio (1664–1678), with works by Andrea Pozzo.
- Cathedral of San Donato, designed by Francesco Gallo.
- Santa Croce Chapel, with a Gothic fresco cycle.
- Medieval walls and towers (12th century).
- Piazza Maggiore (Main Square, 14th-16th century), in Gothic style .
- Church of Santa Chiara.
- Church of the Misericordia (1708–1717), designed by Francesco Gallo.
- Convent of Nostra Donna.
- Palazzo Fauzone.
- Chapel of San Rocco delle Carceri.
- Chapel of San Bernardo delle Forche, with notable Gothic paintings.

Nearby is the Baroque sanctuary of Vicoforte.

== Climate ==
Mondovì has a humid subtropical climate (Köppen: Cfa) with cold winters and warm to hot summers. Spring and fall are rainy, while summer and winter are relatively dry.

Climate data for Mondovì (1991–2020)
Month	Jan	Feb	Mar	Apr	May	Jun	Jul	Aug	Sep	Oct	Nov	Dec	Year
Record high °C (°F)	24.8 (76.6)	25.6 (78.1)	27.0 (80.6)	30.0 (86.0)	33.2 (91.8)	40.2 (104.4)	35.8 (96.4)	37.4 (99.3)	33.4 (92.1)	28.2 (82.8)	23.2 (73.8)	20.0 (68.0)	40.2 (104.4)
Mean daily maximum °C (°F)	6.4 (43.5)	7.9 (46.2)	12.6 (54.7)	16.0 (60.8)	20.4 (68.7)	25.0 (77.0)	27.7 (81.9)	27.2 (81.0)	21.8 (71.2)	15.8 (60.4)	10.1 (50.2)	6.9 (44.4)	16.5 (61.7)
Daily mean °C (°F)	3.6 (38.5)	4.8 (40.6)	8.8 (47.8)	12.0 (53.6)	16.3 (61.3)	20.6 (69.1)	23.1 (73.6)	22.8 (73.0)	18.1 (64.6)	12.9 (55.2)	7.6 (45.7)	4.2 (39.6)	12.9 (55.2)
Mean daily minimum °C (°F)	0.9 (33.6)	1.6 (34.9)	5.0 (41.0)	8.0 (46.4)	12.2 (54.0)	16.1 (61.0)	18.6 (65.5)	18.6 (65.5)	14.4 (57.9)	10.0 (50.0)	5.1 (41.2)	1.7 (35.1)	9.3 (48.7)
Record low °C (°F)	−10.2 (13.6)	−10.2 (13.6)	−6.8 (19.8)	−1.6 (29.1)	0.0 (32.0)	6.0 (42.8)	10.0 (50.0)	9.0 (48.2)	6.8 (44.2)	−1.6 (29.1)	−4.0 (24.8)	−9.4 (15.1)	−10.2 (13.6)
Average precipitation mm (inches)	31.0 (1.22)	34.1 (1.34)	50.2 (1.98)	78.0 (3.07)	80.5 (3.17)	56.5 (2.22)	37.9 (1.49)	43.2 (1.70)	62.0 (2.44)	81.4 (3.20)	101.9 (4.01)	37.9 (1.49)	694.4 (27.34)
Average precipitation days (≥ 1.0 mm)	3.8	3.9	4.7	6.7	7.4	5.6	4.1	4.5	5.6	6.3	7.1	4.1	63.9
Average relative humidity (%)	66.1	62.5	62.2	64.9	70.6	72.1	70.5	72.0	73.4	76.4	73.2	66.4	69.2
Average dew point °C (°F)	−3.1 (26.4)	−2.4 (27.7)	0.8 (33.4)	4.7 (40.5)	10.8 (51.4)	15.0 (59.0)	17.5 (63.5)	17.6 (63.7)	13.4 (56.1)	8.9 (48.0)	2.3 (36.1)	−2.4 (27.7)	6.9 (44.5)
Source: NOAA, (Dew Point for 1981-2010)

== Gallery ==
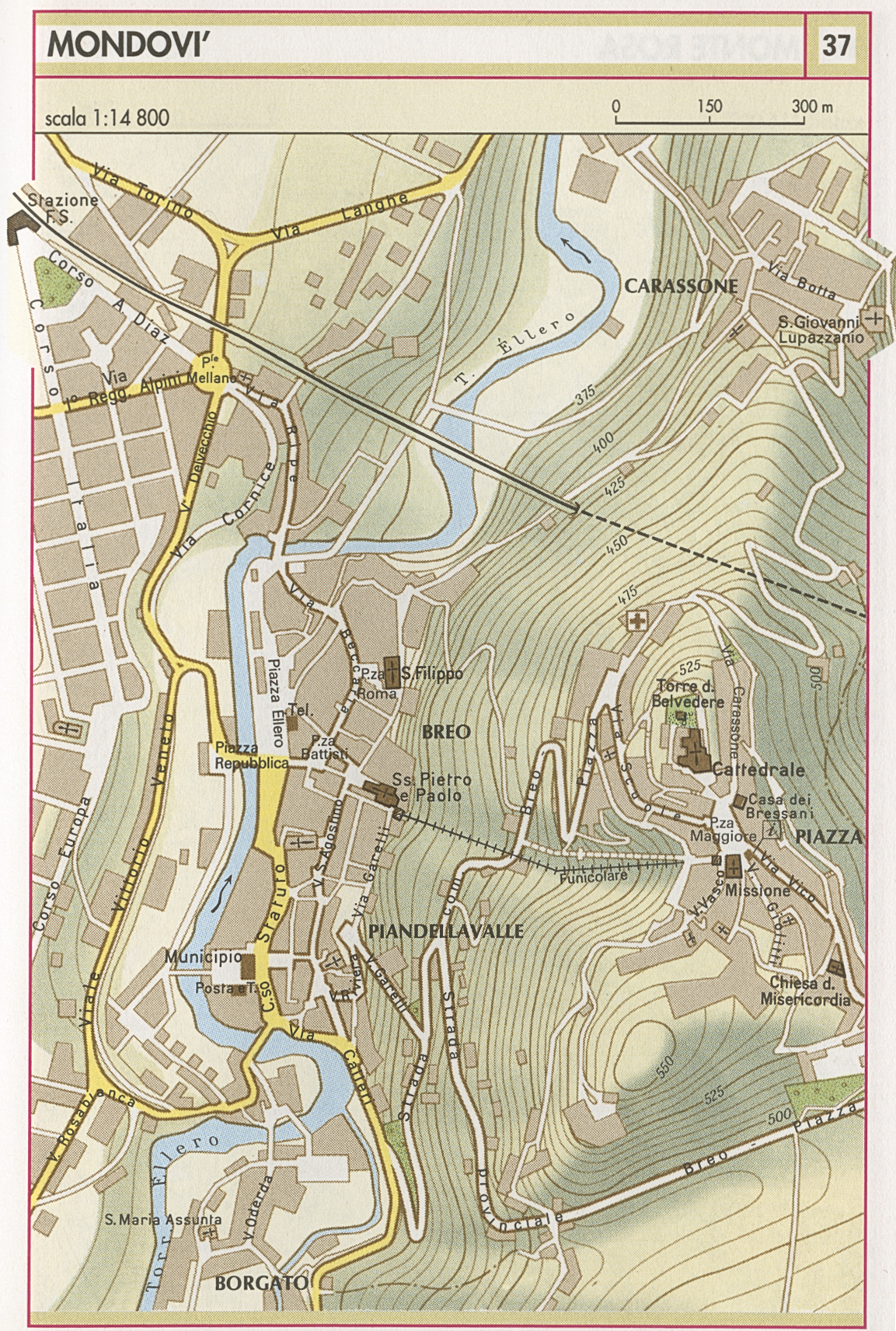
Map of city center

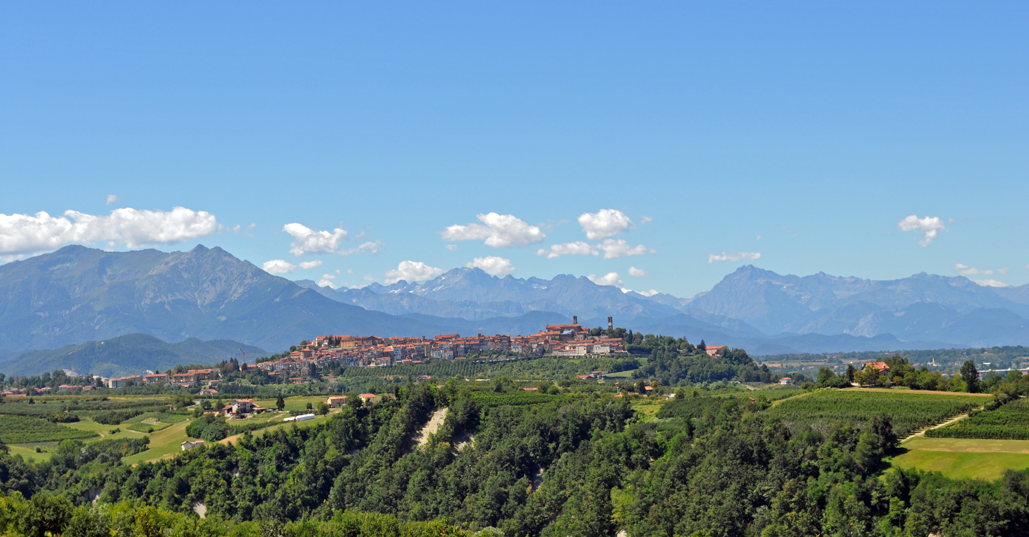
Mondovì

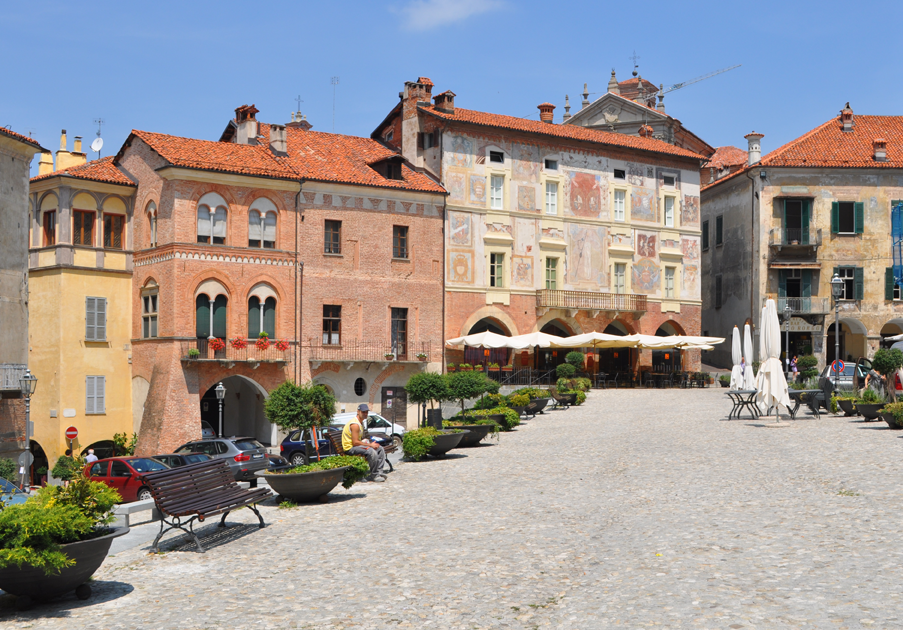
Piazza Maggiore

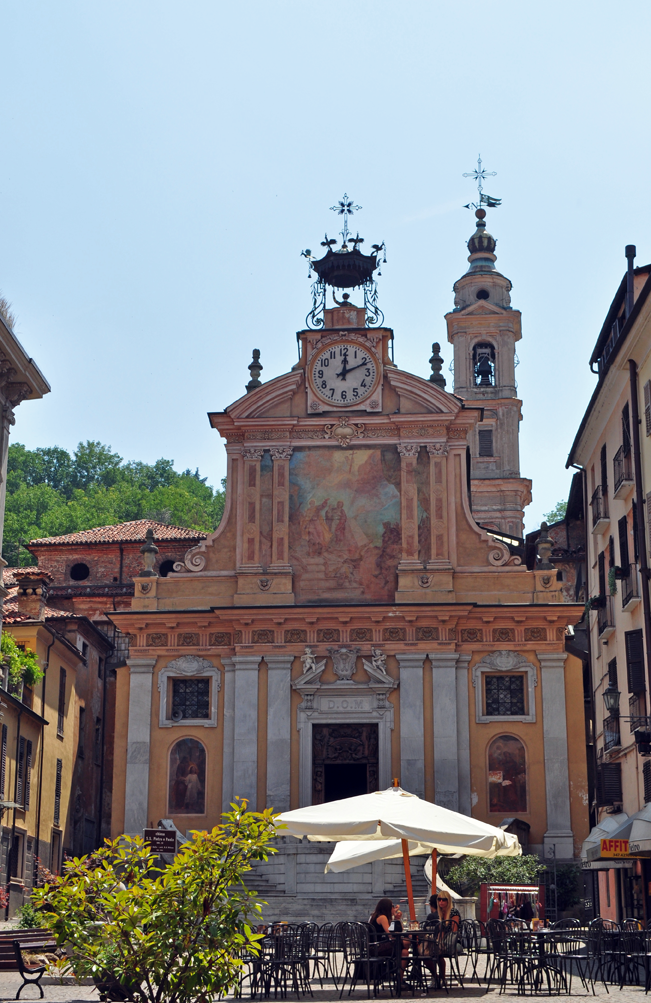
SS Pietro & Paolo

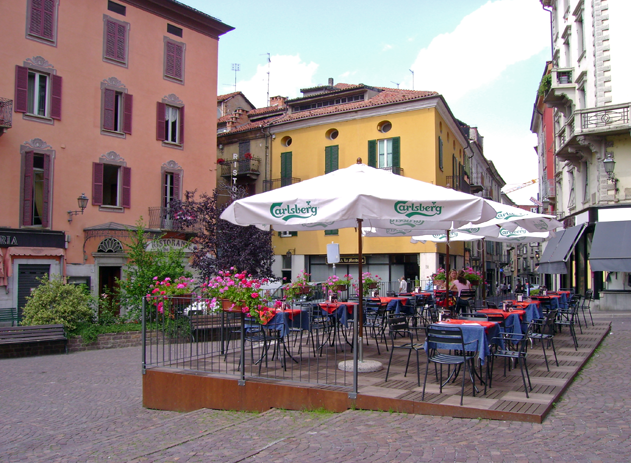
Piazza Battisti

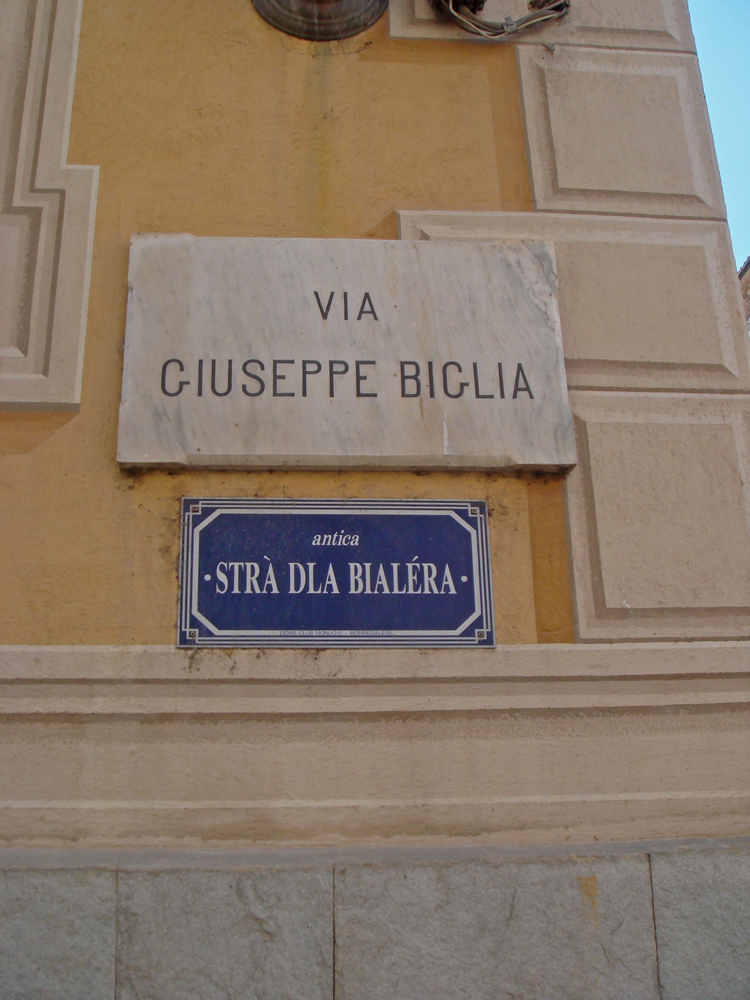
Bilingual street signs

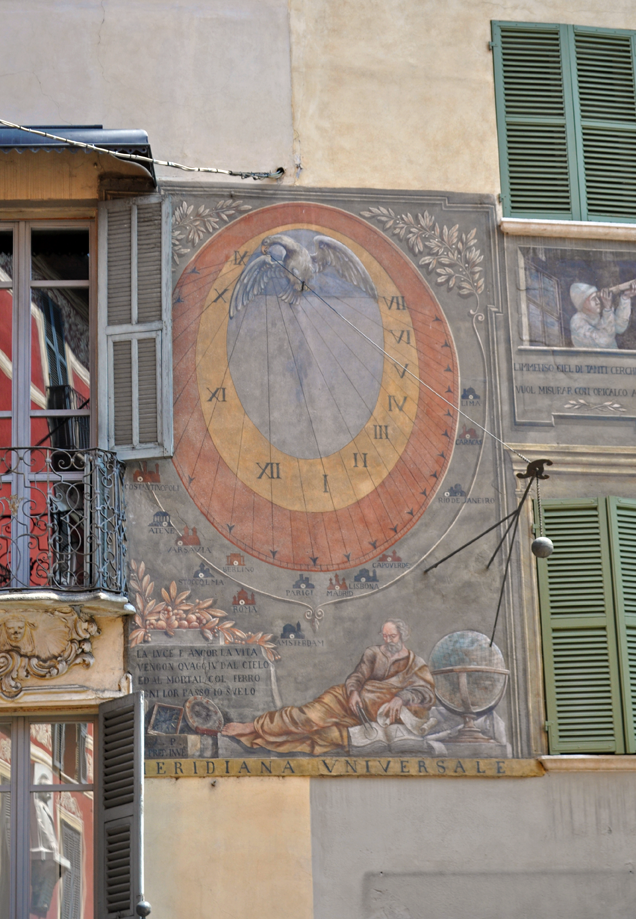
Via della Meridiana

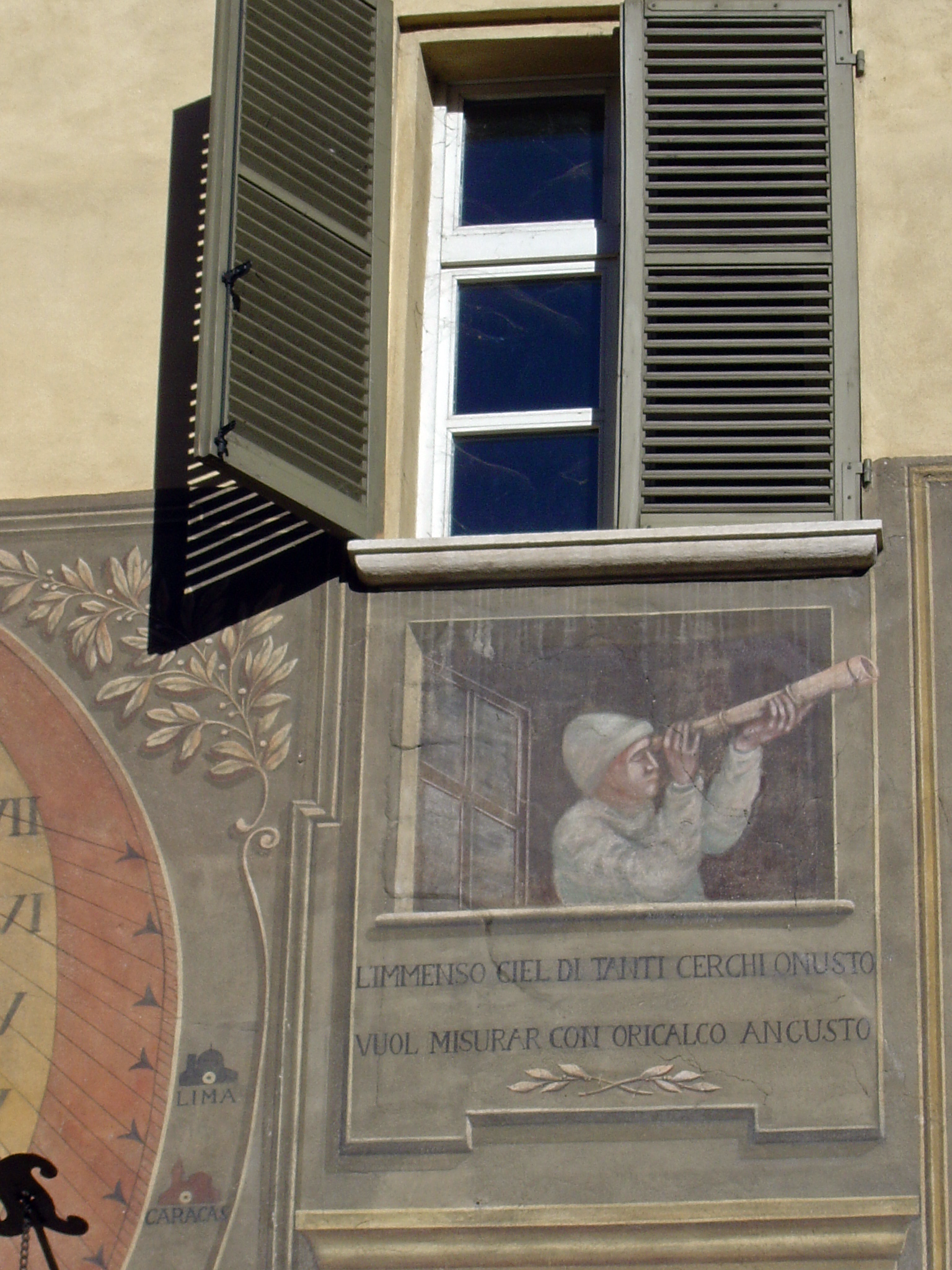
Sundial detail

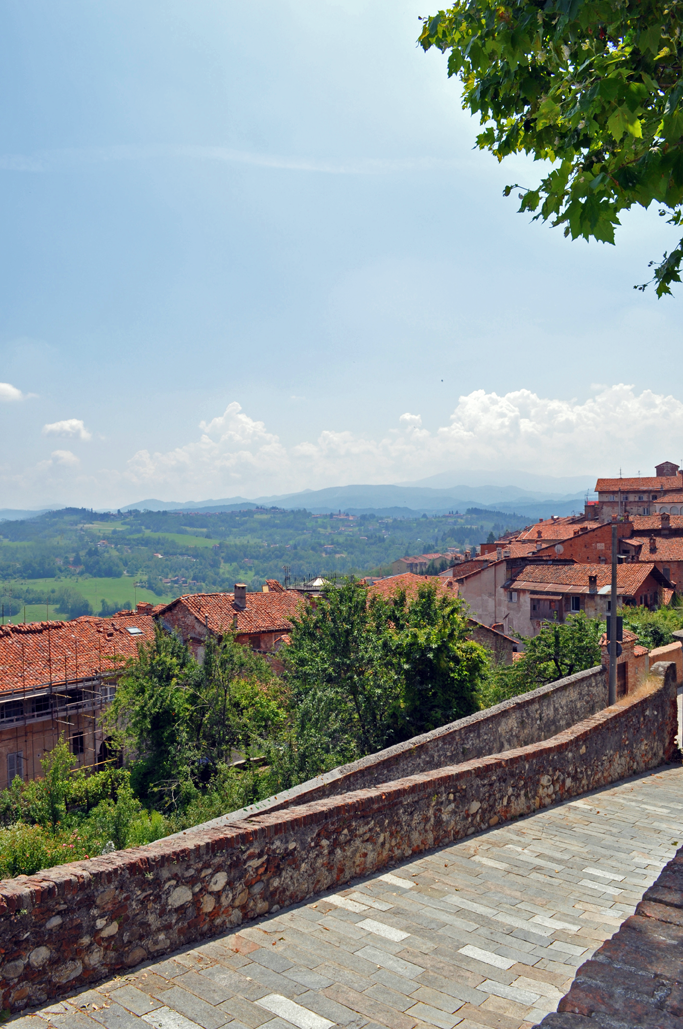
Langa Monregalese

== Notable people ==
Mondovì is the birthplace of

- John Bona (1609–1674), Italian cardinal and author.
- Giovanni Battista Beccaria (1716–1781), physicist.
- Francis Vigo (1747–1836), fur trader, American Revolutionary War hero
- Francesco Canaveri (1753-1836), physician, anatomist, and professor
- Clemente Solaro, Count La Margherita (1792–1869), a Piedmont statesman.
- Giacomo Durando (1807–1894), a general and statesman.
- Teresa De Giuli Borsi (1817–1877), opera singer
- Giovanni Giolitti (1842–1928), five-time Prime Minister of Italy.
- Giovanni Bertone (1884–1972), automobile designer
- Michele Baranowicz (born 1989), volleyball player
- Giovanna Tealdi (born 1942), politician

== See also ==
- Roman Catholic Diocese of Mondovì
