= Pleuron =

Pleuron may refer to:

- Pleuron (Aetolia), a place in Ancient Greece
- Pleuron (son of Aetolus), a figure in Greek mythology

In arthropod anatomy, a pleuron (πλευρ-όν, genitive: -οῦ, neutral, in Greek) is a sclerite on the side of the carapace. It may also refer to:

- Pleuron (crustacean anatomy), the tergum of a crustacean when it overhangs the insertion of the limb on each side as a free plate
- Pleuron (insect anatomy), the lateral portion of a segment of an insect thorax

== See also ==
- "Pleura", a song by King Gizzard & the Lizard Wizard from L.W.
- Plura (disambiguation)
