= Canaveri =

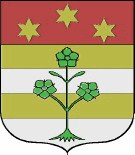
- Coat of Arms of Canaveri
- Current region: Italy; United States; Brazil; Uruguay; Argentina
- Earlier spellings: Canaveriis; Canaverius (Latin)
- Origin: Piedmont; France; Liguria; Switzerland

Canaveri is an Italian and French surname, whose etymology comes from the canapa or chanvre (hemp), an abundant product in ancient times in the regions of the Canavese (Italy) and Chennevières (France). This surname is found in old records of Provence and Cuneo region since the Middle Ages.

The Canaveri surname was taken to the United States of America by Genoese immigrants who arrived towards the end of the 19th century.

== Notable people ==
- Jean Canaveri (13th century) notary of the County of Provence.
- Nicoleti Canaveri (14th century) notary of Saluzzo.
- Domenico Canaveri (born in 15th century) notary of Bagnasco in 1500s.
- Pierre Canaveri (17th century) French Jesuit missionary who served in China.
- Giovanni Battista Canaveri (1753–1811), Italian Catholic Bishop
- Francesco Canaveri (1753–1836), Italian physician and professor
- Pedro Canaveri (1891–195?), a president of the Argentine Football Association
- Zoilo Canaveri (1893–1966) Uruguayan soccer player
