= Santa Croce, Mondovì =

Chapel in Mondovì, Italy

The Chapel of the Holy Cross (Italian: Cappella di Santa Croce) is a small Roman Catholic chapel in Mondovì, province of Cuneo, Piedmont, Italy. Dedicated to the True Cross, it is part of the Roman Catholic Diocese of Mondovì.

Its origins are lost in time: the existence of the building was first documented in the early 13th century. The central part dates back to around the first half of the 14th century, while the small triangular bell tower and portico date back to the 17th-18th centuries. The church or oratory belonged to the Confraternity of the Holy Cross. Inside, there are frescoes dating back to around 1450-1460, which are one of the finest examples of European Gothic painting. They are attributed to the painter Antonio ‘Dragone’ da Monteregale, an artist who was active in Molini di Triora and the Monregalesi valleys in the mid-15th century.
