= San Giovanni Battista, Racconigi =

Church building in Racconigi, Italy

Coordinates: 44.7683°N 7.6796°E

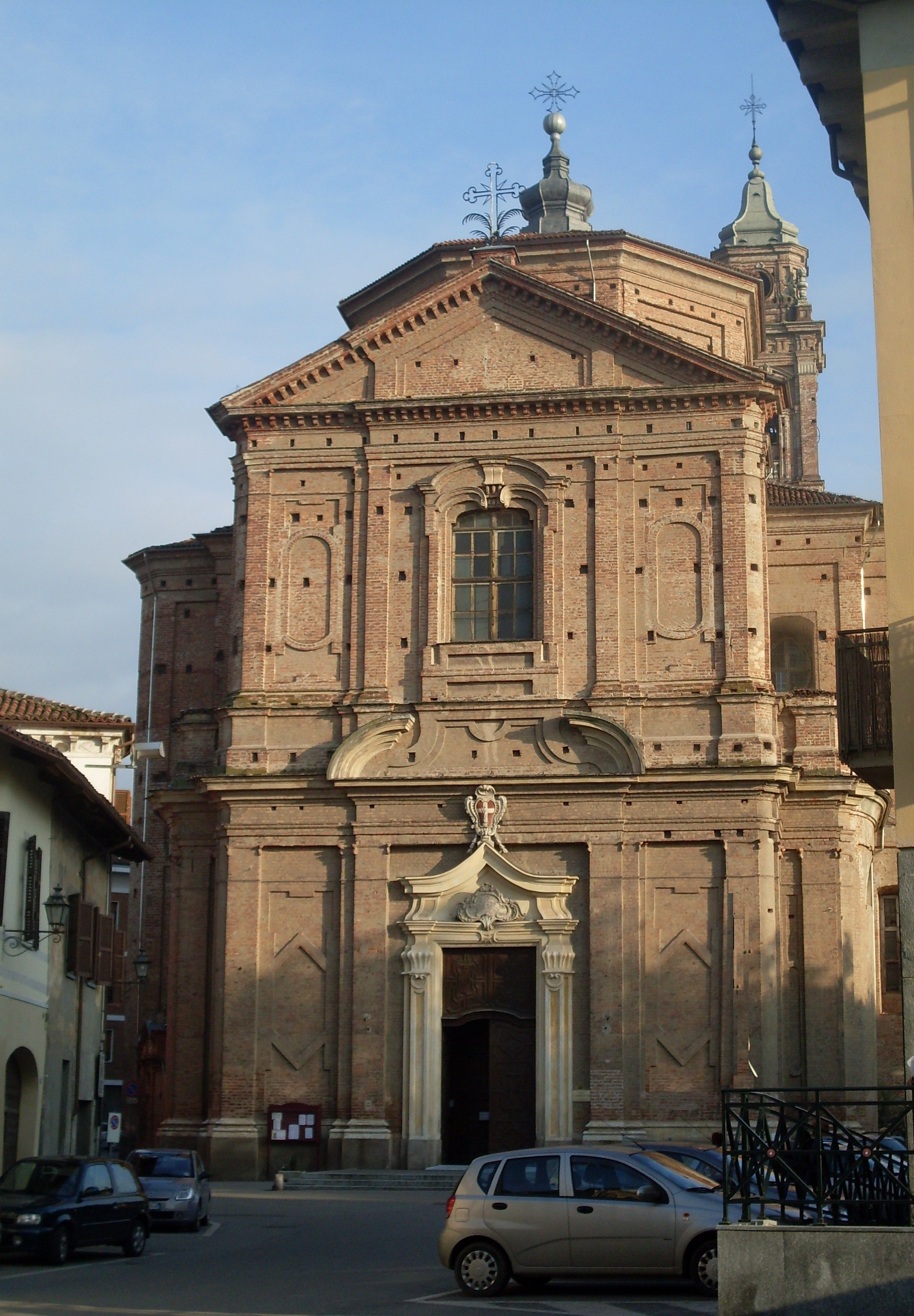
Facade of Church

The Church of San Giovanni Battista, while only a parish church in Racconigi, Italy, because of its size, it is considered the duomo of the town.

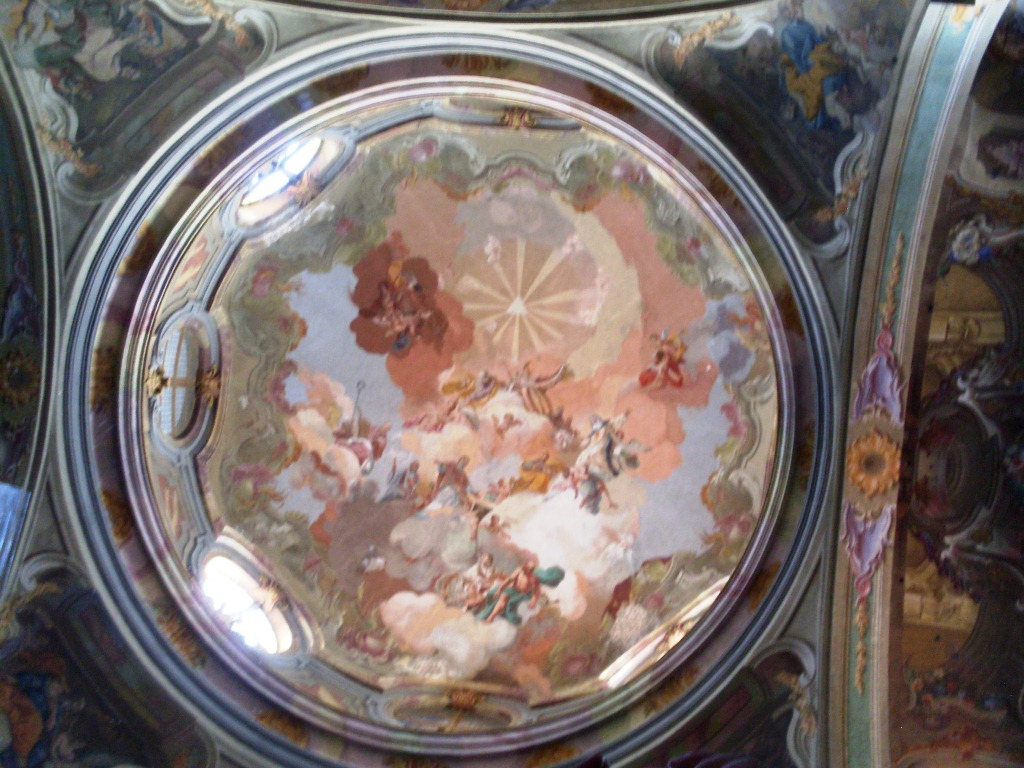
Frescoed cupola

A church at the site is documented from the 14th century. It was reconstructed in the 18th century by the architect Francesco Gallo, with interior quadratura decoration by Pietro Antonio Pozzo and Giuseppe Dallamano. The altar statuary were carved by Carlo Giuseppe Plura and Stefano Maria Clemente. The main altarpiece is by Claudio Francesco Beaumont. The church gallery has a painting by Carlo Sismonda.
