= Nostra Donna Convent, Mondovì =

Convent in Mondovì, Italy

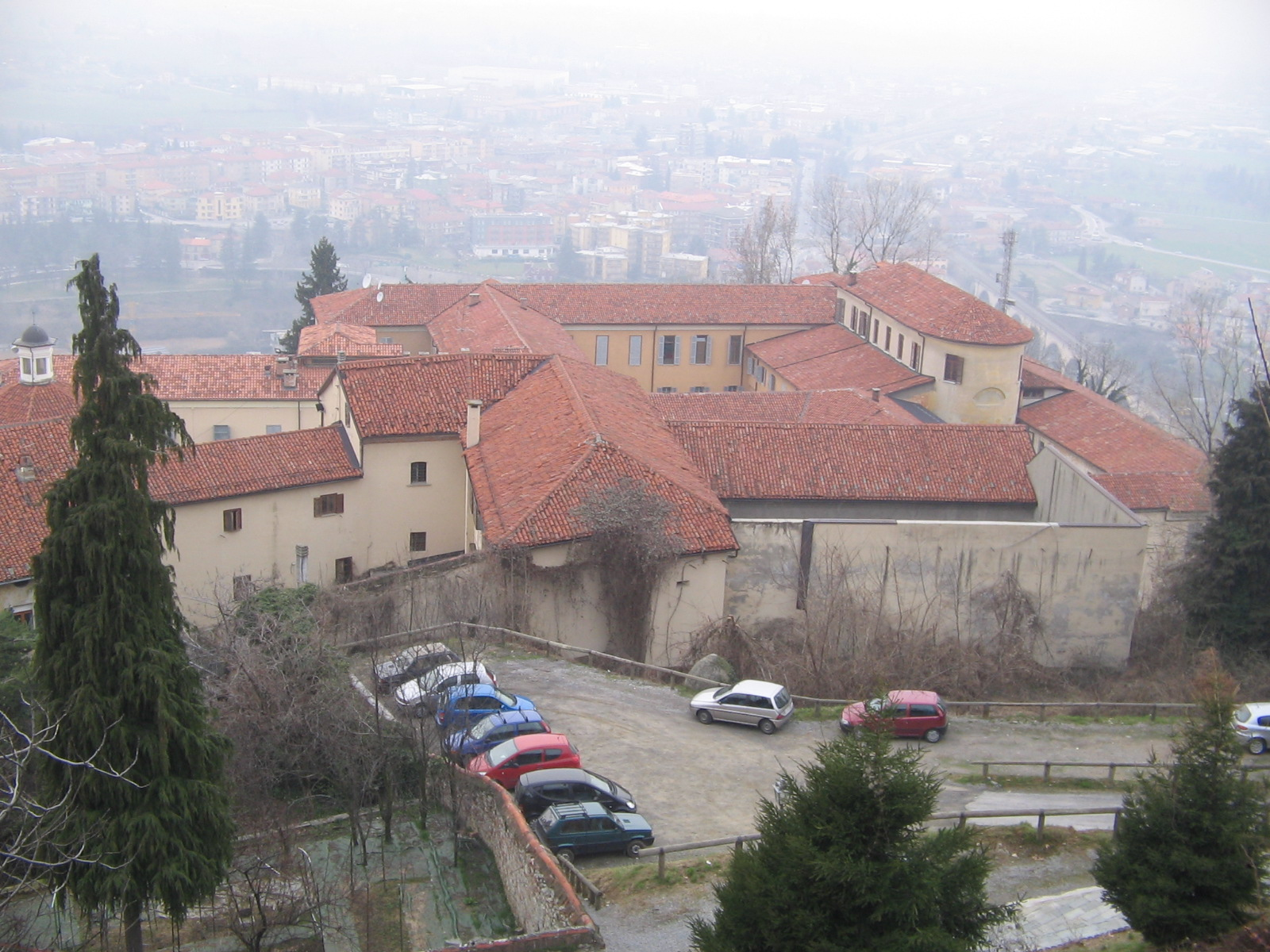

The Convent of Our Lady (Italian: Convento di Nostra Donna) is a Roman Catholic convent in Mondovì, province of Cuneo, Piedmont, Italy. Dedicated to Mary, mother of Jesus, it is part of the Roman Catholic Diocese of Mondovì.

The original ensemble dates back to the 1470s. Successive modifications and expansions altered the building. Among several architects and artists who worked here, Francesco Gallo is worth mentioning.
