= Mondovì Funicular =

Italian railway

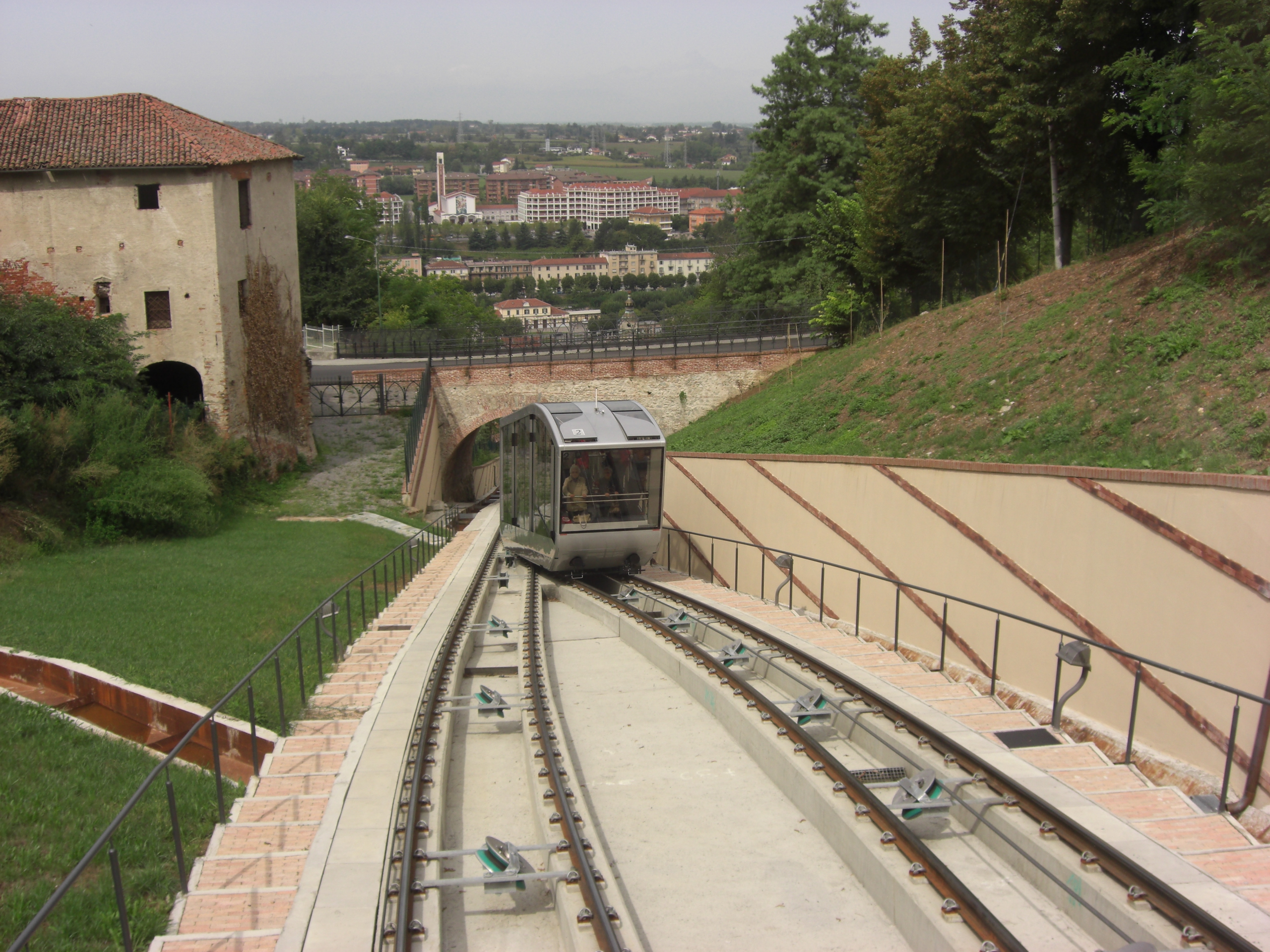
- Car at the passing loop

Overview
- Coordinates: 44.388118°N 7.82645°E

Service
- Type: Funicular

History
- Opened: 1886

Technical
- Line length: 551 m (1,808 ft)
- Track gauge: 1,435 mm (4 ft 8 1/2 in) standard gauge
- Maximum incline: 37%

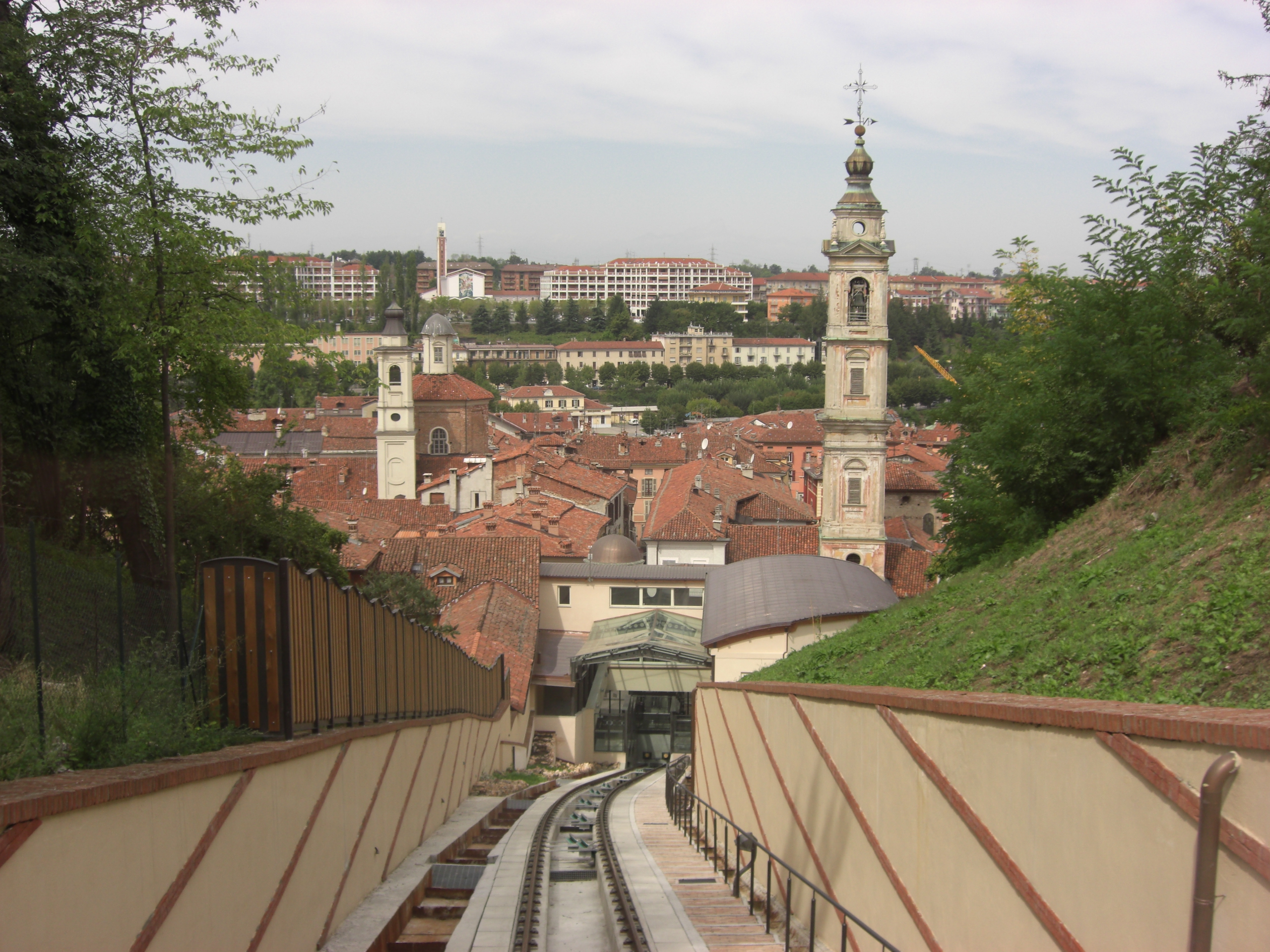
The lower station from above

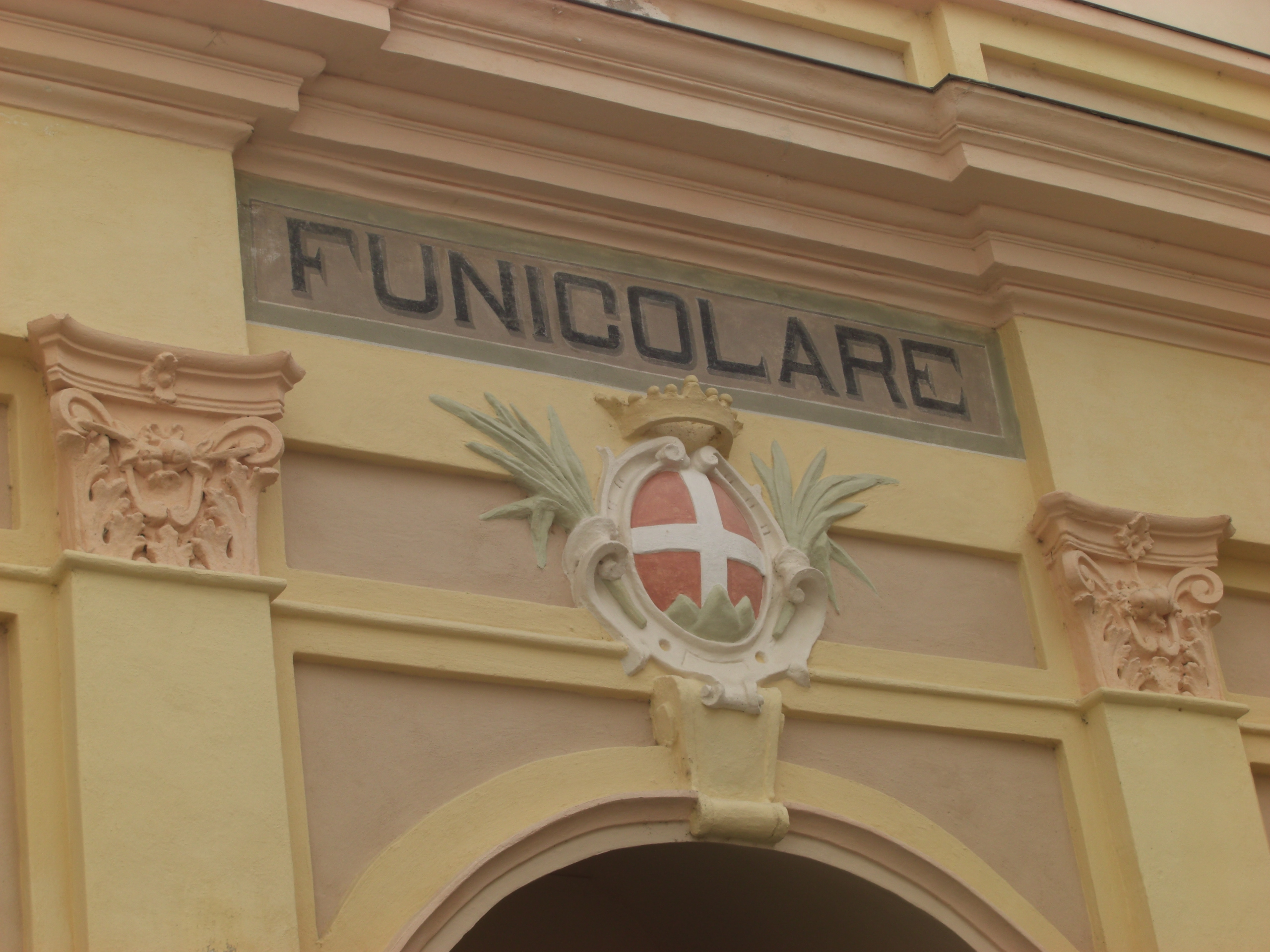
Detail from the lower station

The Mondovì Funicular (Italian: Funicolare di Mondovì) is a funicular railway in the town of Mondovì, Piedmont, Italy. It links Breo, the old quarter, with Piazza, the upper part of the town.

The line first opened in 1886 and was initially operated using the water counterbalance system. The line was converted to electrical operation in 1926 and was closed to traffic on December 24, 1975. After over thirty years closure, followed by a major rebuild, the line was reopened on December 16, 2006. The reconstruction was done by the consortium Doppelmayr Italia-Impresa Generale Costruzioni Garboli SpA-Mondovì. The rebuild involved the reconstruction of the two terminal stations, construction of a new passing loop, and the provision of two new panoramic cars.

The funicular operates every 10 minutes. On most days service is between 07.30 and 19.50, with service until midnight on Fridays and Saturdays, and no service until 10.20 on Sundays and public holidays. On the first Monday of each month, there is no service after 13.40.

The funicular has the following technical parameters:

| Configuration | single track with passing loop |
| Length | 551 m (1,808 ft) |
| Height | 137 m (449 ft) |
| Maximum steepness | 37% |
| Track gauge | 1,435 mm (4 ft 8 1/2 in) |
| Number of cars | 2 |
| Capacity | 68 passengers per car |
| Maximum speed | 6.5 m/s (21 ft/s) |
| Trip time | 2 minutes |
| Traction | Electricity |

In 2018, the line carried 386,847 passengers.

== See also ==
- List of funicular railways
