= San Bernardo delle Forche, Mondovì =

Church building in Mondovì, Italy

The Church of Saint Bernard of the Gallows (Italian: San Bernardo delle Forche) is a small Roman Catholic chapel in Mondovì, province of Cuneo, Piedmont, Italy. Dedicated to saint Bernard of Clairvaux, it is part of the Roman Catholic Diocese of Mondovì.

This chapel is named after the gallows, originally visible from the square, which at that time was the true center of the city.

The 15th-century paintings in this chapel, by Antonio da Monteregale, extol the motherhood of the Virgin Mary and are influenced by Nordic and Provençal art.
