= Giovanna Tealdi =

Italian politician (born 1942)

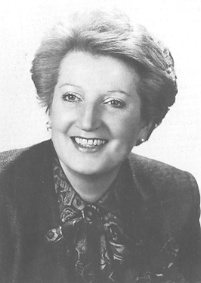

Member of the Chamber of Deputies
- In office 29 June 1987 – 14 April 1994

Personal details
- Born: 11 August 1942 (age 83); Mondovì, Cuneo, Italy
- Political party: Christian Democracy; Italian People's Party

Giovanna Maria Tealdi (born 11 August 1942) is an Italian former politician. She was a member of the Chamber of Deputies from 1987 to 1994, representing the Christian Democracy and the Italian People's Party.

== Early life ==
Tealdi was born on 11 August 1942 in Mondovì, Cuneo. She was the director of a travel agency. She was a member of the board of directors of the Fondazione Cassa di Savings Bank of Cuneo between 2011 and 2016. She was technical and commercial director of Venus Viaggi and councilor of the Bank of Italy. She was provincial and municipal president and member of the provincial council of the Centro Italiano Femminile (CIF). She is married and has three children.

== Political career ==
Tealdi was first elected to the Chamber of Deputies on 29 June 1987 as a representative for the constituency of Cuneo-Alessandria-Asti. She was a member of the Christian Democracy. She was a member of the labour commission. She was re-elected in the 1992 general election on 22 April 1992, when she served as a member of the foreign affairs commission, the public works commission and the labour commission. In 1994, she became a member of the Italian People's Party. She left office on 14 April 1994.

She was re-elected as president of the cultural association Women for the Granda on 29 April 2022, an organisation that she helped found in 2010.
