= San Rocco delle Carceri, Mondovì =

Church building in Mondovì, Italy

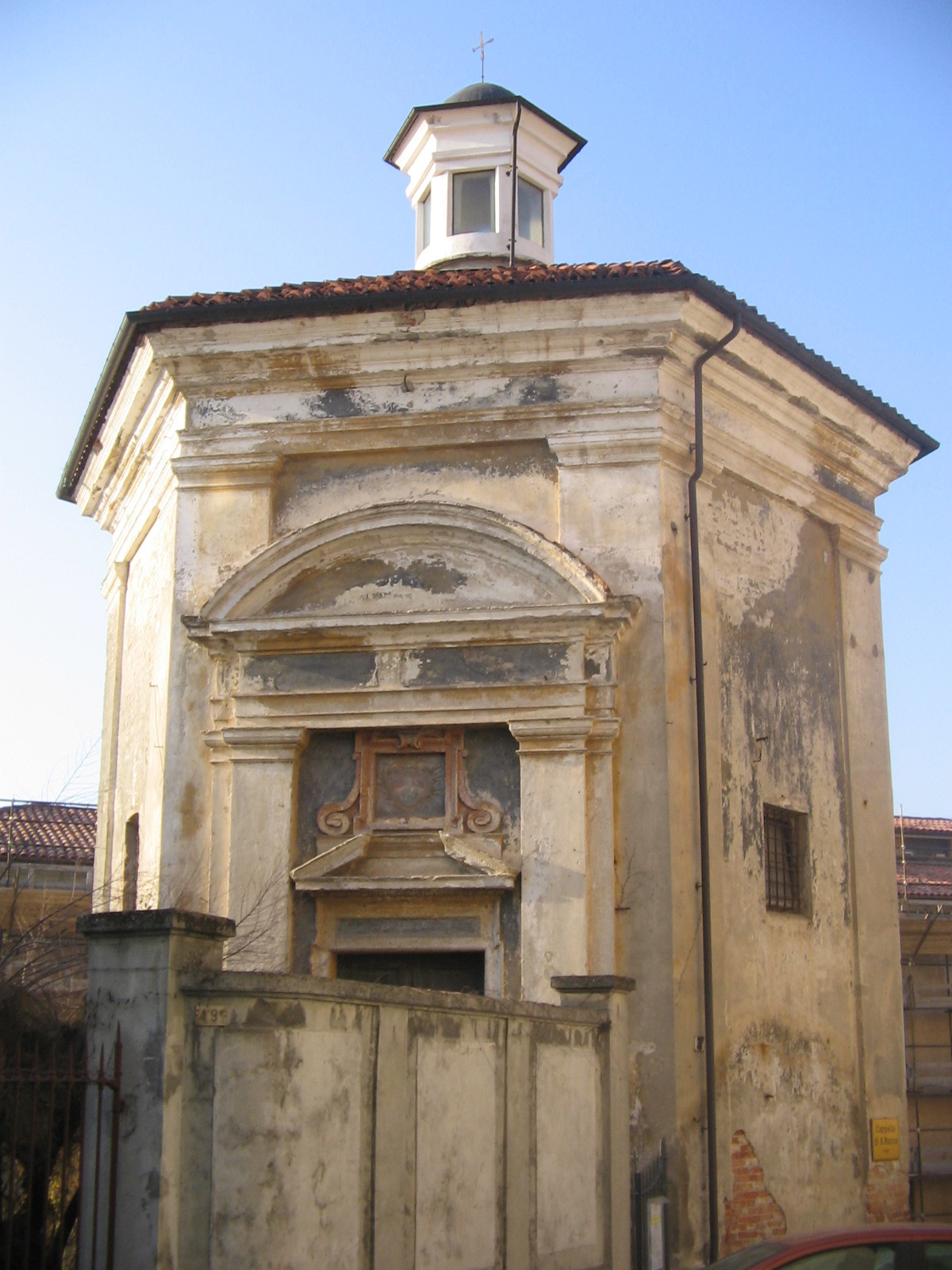

The Cappella di San Rocco delle Carceri is a small Roman Catholic chapel in Mondovì, province of Cuneo, Piedmont, Italy. Dedicated to Saint Roch, it is part of the Roman Catholic Diocese of Mondovì.

Its denomination "delle carceri" is due to the fact that opposite the chapel stood the prison. The small hexagonal building was constructed between 1630 and 1640 with funding from the Municipality of Mondovì and private citizens. At the time, it was part of the cloister garden of the Zoccolanti friars.
