= Francesco Gallo =

Italian architect and engineer

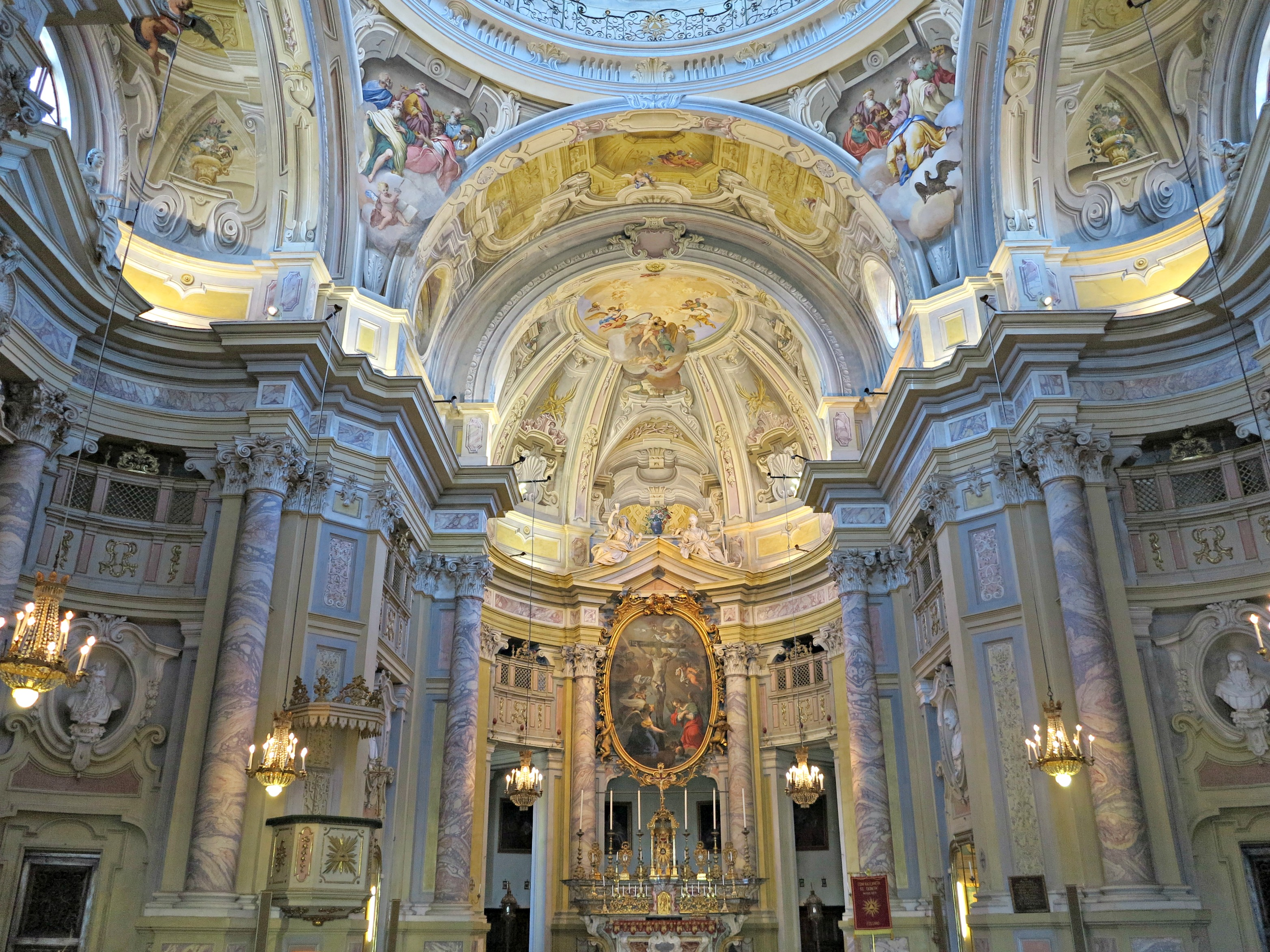
Interior of Gallo's Battuti Rossi in Fossano (1727)

Francesco Gallo (1672-1750) was an Italian architect and engineer. He designed over 100 works during his career, including the massive cupola on the Sanctuary of Vicoforte.

Gallo was born in Mondovì in the Piedmont region of Italy. He was a student of Antonio Bertola.

== Partial list of works ==
- Mondovì Cathedral (1743)
- San Giovanni Battista, Racconigi (1730)
- Battuti Rossi (Trinity Church), Fossano (1727)
- Chiesa Sant'Antonio Abate, Priero (1716)
- Dome of the Sanctuary of Vicoforte (1729)
- Alterations in the Convent of Our Lady, Mondovì (1740-1741)
