= Joseph Plura =

Italian sculptor

Giuseppe Antonio Plura (died 18 March 1756), better known in England as Joseph Plura (sometimes suffixed "the elder" on account of his son Joseph Plura Junior also being a sculptor), was an Italian sculptor who later moved to Bath, England.

== Biography ==
=== Early life ===
Joseph was born the son of Carlo Giuseppe Plura (1663–1737), a well known Turinese sculptor, and was part of a family of Turinese sculptors.

Little is known about his early life. It is thought that he is the Plura that was noted as being an assistant to Stuccoist Giovanni Bagutti (1681–?) in the work on Castle Howard in Yorkshire between 1709 and 1712 where it suspected they were working in order to attempt to gain the commissions to perform the sculpture work on the rebuilding of St Paul's Cathedral in London, but they were unsuccessful in this regard and he probably returned to Italy when work on Castle Howard was completed.

It is also said that he probably trained at the Carlo Emanuele III Sculpture Academy as well as in Paris, but as Carlo Emanuele III was crowned in 1730 it is likely that this academy was founded when Plura was already a trained sculptor.

=== Later career ===
Not much is further know about his life until about 1747 where he had taken on a commission in Madrid to teach the son of King Fernando VI about sculpture. In 1748 however he had a disagreement with the contractor who had employed him to teach the prince, reputed because he was not getting paid and he subsequently left Spain.

He is next recorded in 1750 in Bath, England where he was married to Mary Ford (1733–1825), the 17-year-old daughter of John Ford (1711–1767) the master mason for whom he was working under the employ of Prince Hoare (1711–1769). Mary would have been 8 months pregnant at the time, as the couple's first child was born less than a month later. It has been noted that Mary spoke no Italian, so Giuseppe would have met her in Bath. It is also known that Prince Hoare visited Italy in 1749 and so it is likely that it is there that he met Giuseppe and convinced him to return to Bath with him.

After several years of working for Prince Hoare, where it thought he was the sculptor of the bust of Beau Nash which today adorns the wall of the Pump Room in Bath and at the time was attributed to Hoare, he opened his own studio in Bath by 1753 where the piece now displayed in the Brownsword Gallery at the Holburne Museum "Diana and Endymion" was used as a centrepiece. At some stage before 1755 Joseph had moved his studio to Oxford Row in London but it appears business was not going well because in April 1755 he approached the King of Sardinia about returning to Turin, who agreed to hire him in the service of the King. Plura eventually decided to accept the offer almost a year later. The ambassador in London wrote to Turin on 18 March 1756 that Plura had intended to leave England for Piedmont in April but he had died that very morning "d'une fievre maligne".

=== Family ===
Giuseppe left behind three children Mary (1751–1831) who married Thomas Bartrum of Exeter, Joseph jr (1753–1785) – who was also a sculptor, and John (1755–1831) an auctioneer and upholsterer who married Frances Delaval – daughter of Sir Francis Delaval and niece of Lord John Hussey Delaval.
