= Joseph Plura the Younger =

Italian sculptor

Giuseppe Plura Giovane, better known as Joseph Plura the Younger or Joseph Plura Junior, was an English sculptor of Italian descent active in Britain between 1777 and 1786. His father Joseph Plura the Elder and his paternal grandfather Carlo Giuseppe Plura were also both sculptors. His only known surviving work is a relief self-portrait in wax, now in the Victoria and Albert Museum.
