= Francesco Canaveri =

Italian physician and professor

Francesco Antonio Canaveri
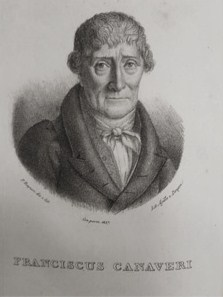

Professor of medicine of the University of Turin

Personal details
- Born: 1753 Mondovì, Cuneo, Piedmont, Kingdom of Sardinia
- Died: 1836 (aged 82–83) Turin, Piedmont, Kingdom of Sardinia
- Occupation: Professor; Physician
- Profession: Medic

Francesco Antonio Canaveri (1753–1836) was an Italian medical doctor and Professor of Anatomy. He was a tenacious opponent of the doctrines of Cullen and Brown, who espoused the so-called Brunonian theory of medicine, which regarded disorders as caused by either defective or excessive excitation.

== Biography ==
Francesco Canaveri was born in Mondovì, son of a distinguished family of Piedmontese patricians. After finishing high school, he began his studies in Rhetoric and Philosophy in the University of Turin. In 1788, he was elected to the post of prefect in the Turin School of Medicine

In 1796 Canaveri became professor of Materia Medica and anatomy of the University of Turin. In 1799 during the Napoleonic occupation of Piedmont, Canaveri had been chosen to lead medical schools beyond the Alps. Between 1800-1814 he was appointed Inspector of the medical schools.

In 1807, Canaveri sent to Padua a work on physiological observations, and for the year 1815, another paper on the usefulness of physiological notions for pathology and practical medicine. He also had made some writings in medical neurology. He was the author of several popular works in this matter, including De vitalitatis oeconomia (1801), Saggio sopra il dolore: dissertazione (1803), Analyse et réfutation des élémens de médecine du D. J. Brown (1805) and Neuronomia, (1836) published after his death.

Francesco Canaveri maintained friendship ties with notable personalities of science such as Francesco Rossi and Giovanni Francesco Cigna, members of the Accademia delle Scienze di Torino. He died in February, 1836 in Turin at the age of 82 years.
