= Sanctuary of Vicoforte =

Church building in Vicoforte, Italy

Coordinates: 44°22′00″N 7°51′00″E

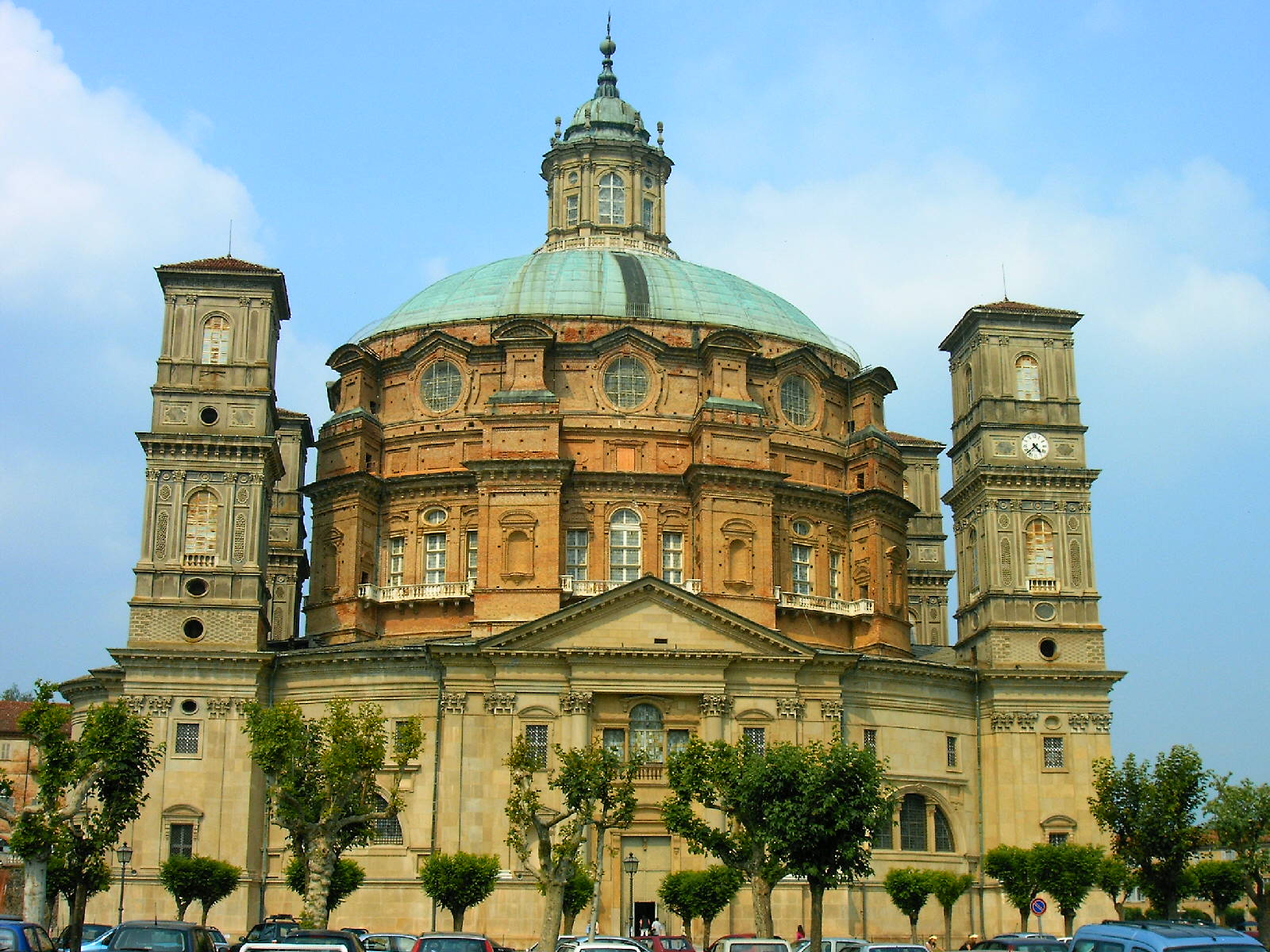
The left (or ecclesiastical north) façade

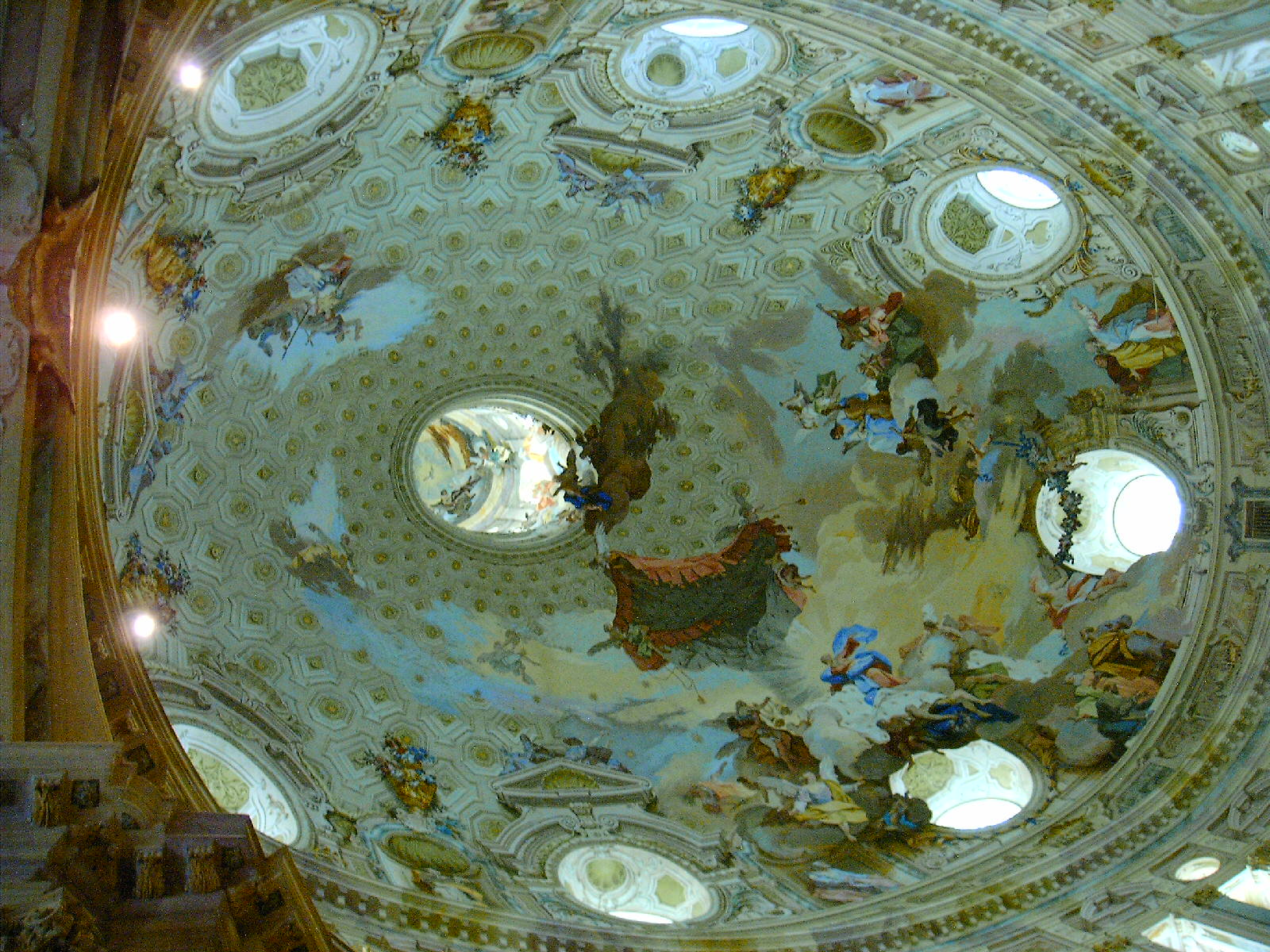
The frescoed vault of the elliptical cupola

The Santuario di Vicoforte (also known as Santuario Regina Montis Regalis) is a monumental church located in the commune of Vicoforte, province of Cuneo, Piedmont, northern Italy. It is known for having the largest elliptical cupola in the world.

== History ==
It originated as a small medieval sanctuary consisting of a modest shrine containing a fifteenth-century fresco depicting a Madonna and Child. Around 1590, a shooting party passed by and a huntsman accidentally struck the image of the Virgin. According to legend, she began to bleed. The penitent huntsman added his arquebus to the shrine and began to collect the large sum of money which would be needed to repair the damage and expiate his sin. Today the arquebus is preserved in a chapel of the sanctuary near the fresco which it had disfigured.

In time the place became a centre of pilgrimage. An early visitor was the duke Charles Emmanuel I of Savoy who, in 1596, commissioned the construction of a large sanctuary from the court architect Ascanio Vitozzi. However the death of both the duke (who had wanted to be buried here) and of the architect put a stop to the building work.

Construction was resumed in the eighteenth century under Francesco Gallo, who built the great elliptical cupola with major and minor diameters of 36 and 25 metres (118 and 82 ft). It is said that Gallo was required to remove the scaffolding himself, as nobody thought that a structure of this type would be able to stand on its own.

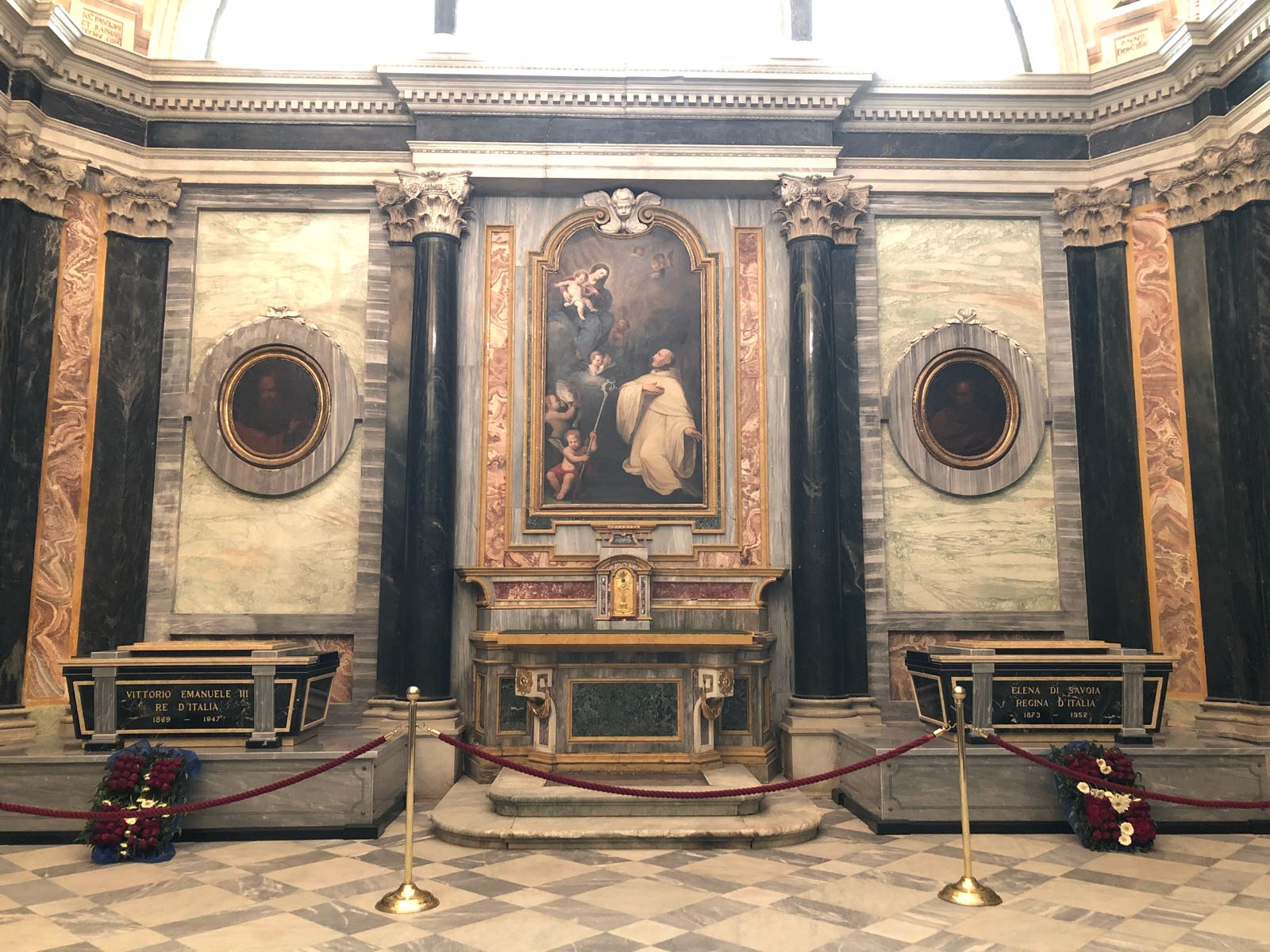
Tomb of Victor Emmanuel III of Italy and Elena of Montenegro

The decoration in fresco of the 6,032 square metres (64,930 sq ft) of the cupola’s vault was completed in 1752 by Mattia Bortoloni and Felice Biella, and the sanctuary finally attained its current form in 1884, when the campanili were built along with the three façades.

On December 15, 2017, after years of planning, the remains of Queen Elena of Italy were transferred without prior public notice from Montpellier, France, to the chapel of San Bernardo inside the sanctuary. Two days later, the remains of King Vittorio Emanuele III of Italy were transferred from St. Catherine's Cathedral, Alexandria, Egypt, where he had died in exile, and interred alongside those of his wife.

== Gallery ==
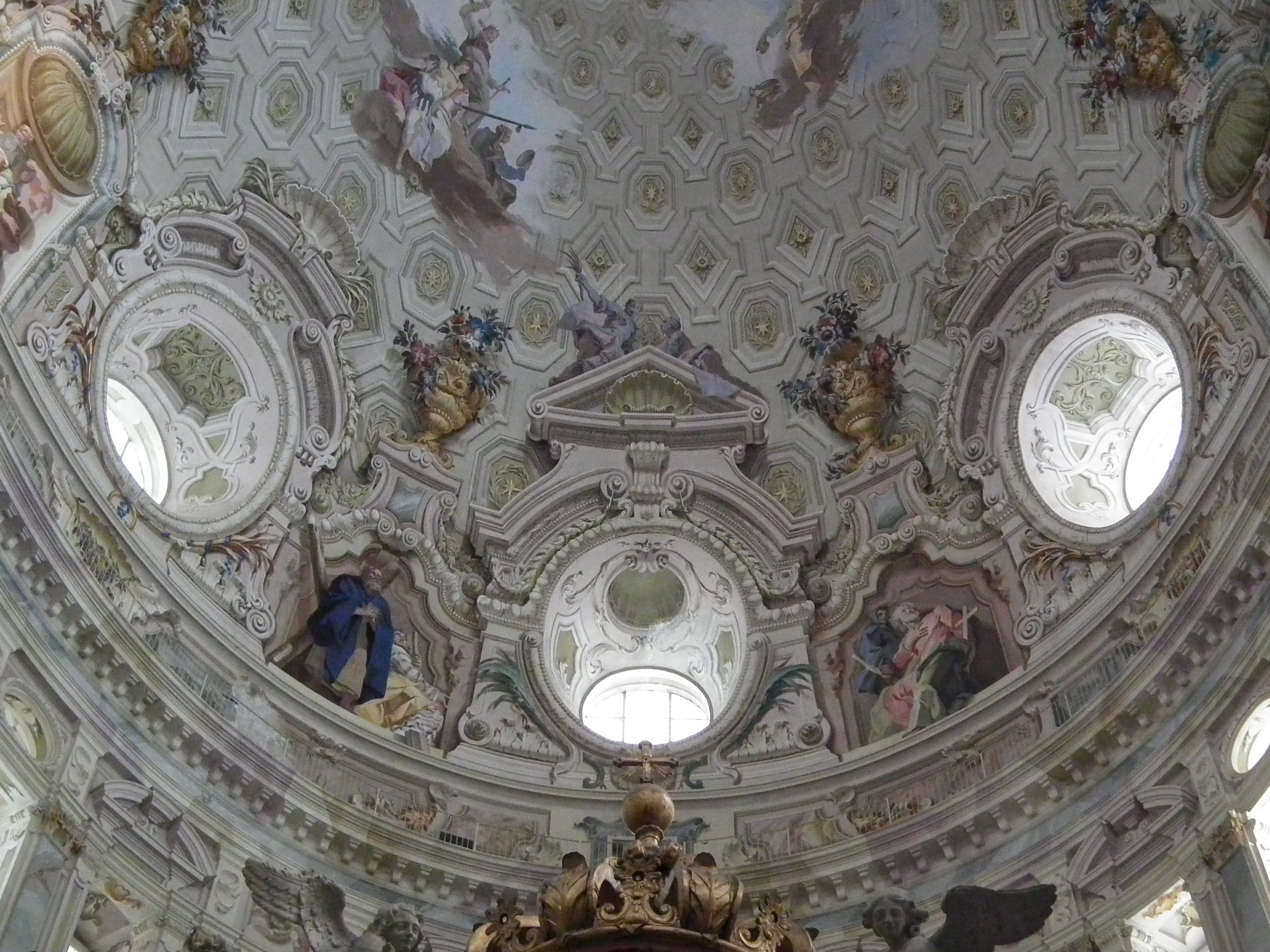
Fresco on dome

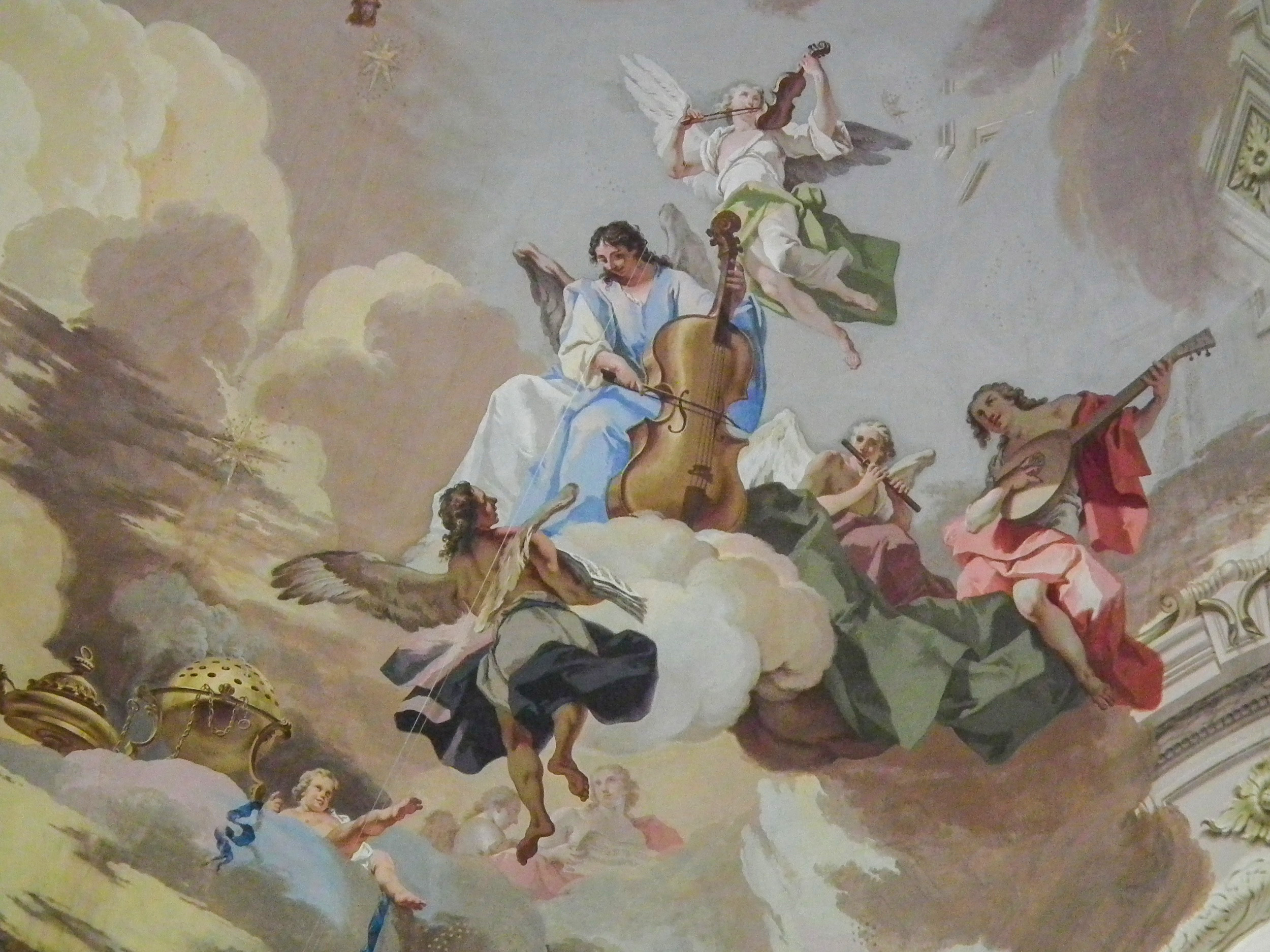
Fresco of musical angels

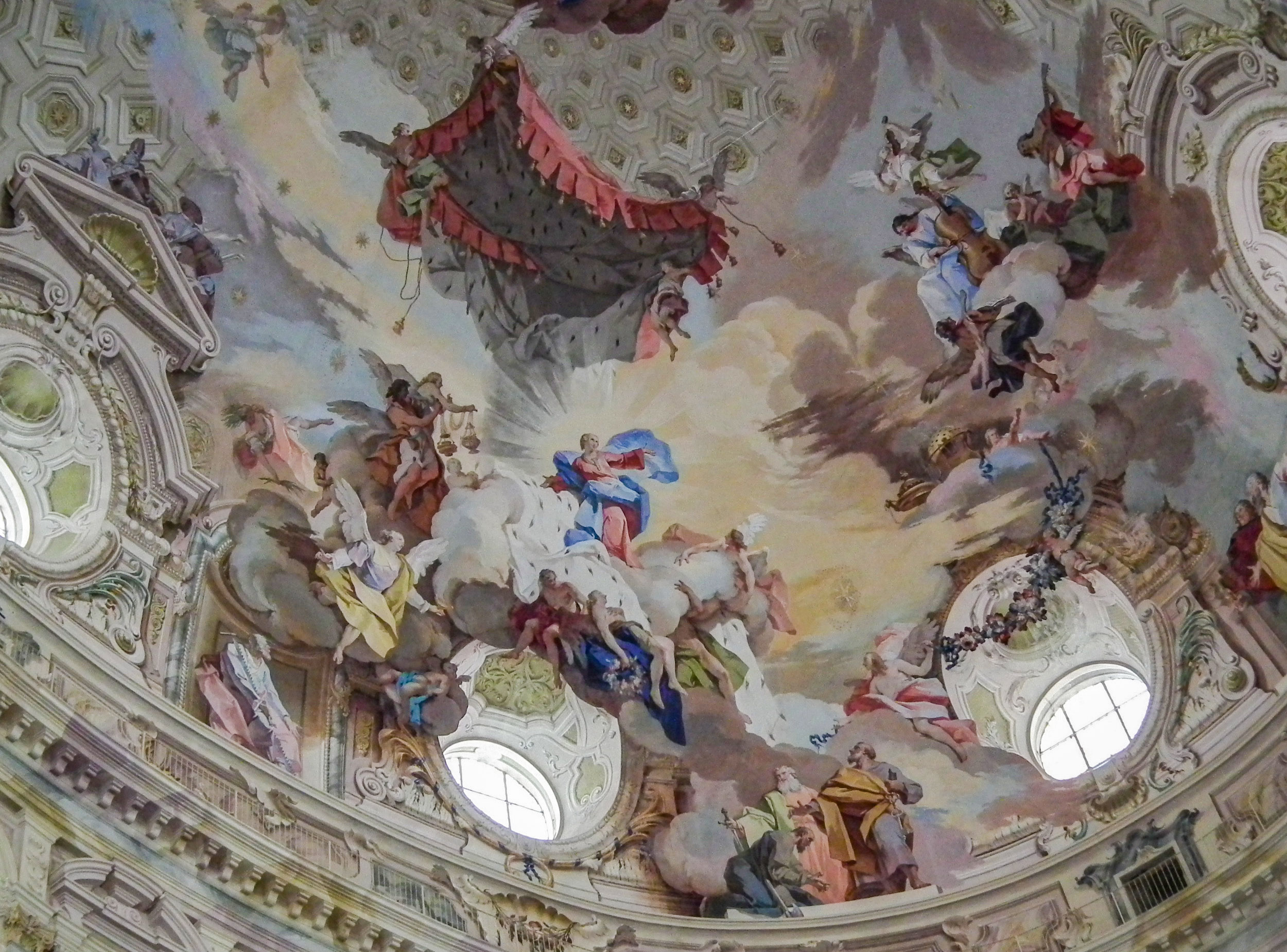
The Virgin Mary depicted on the dome
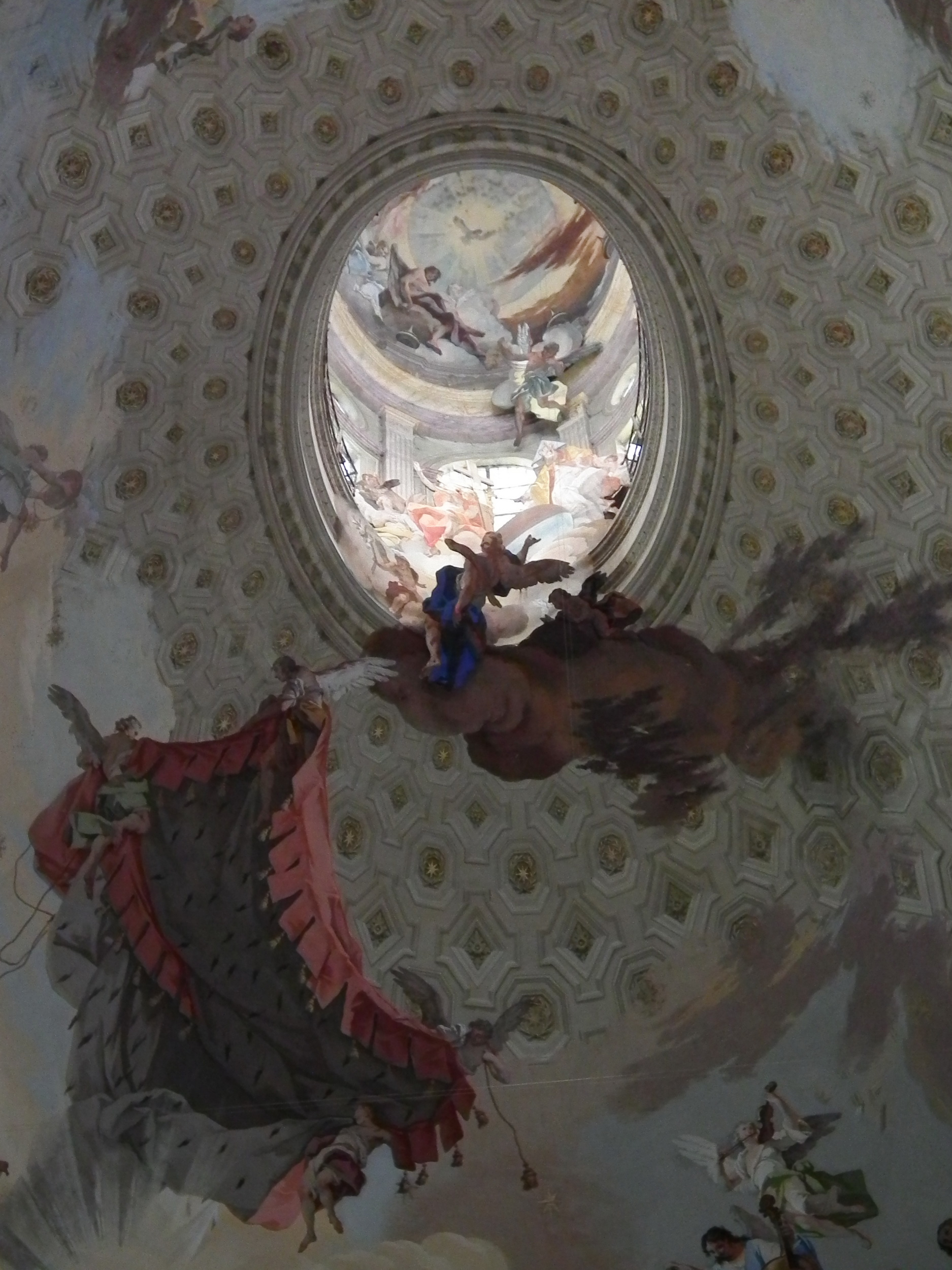
Close up of the cupola

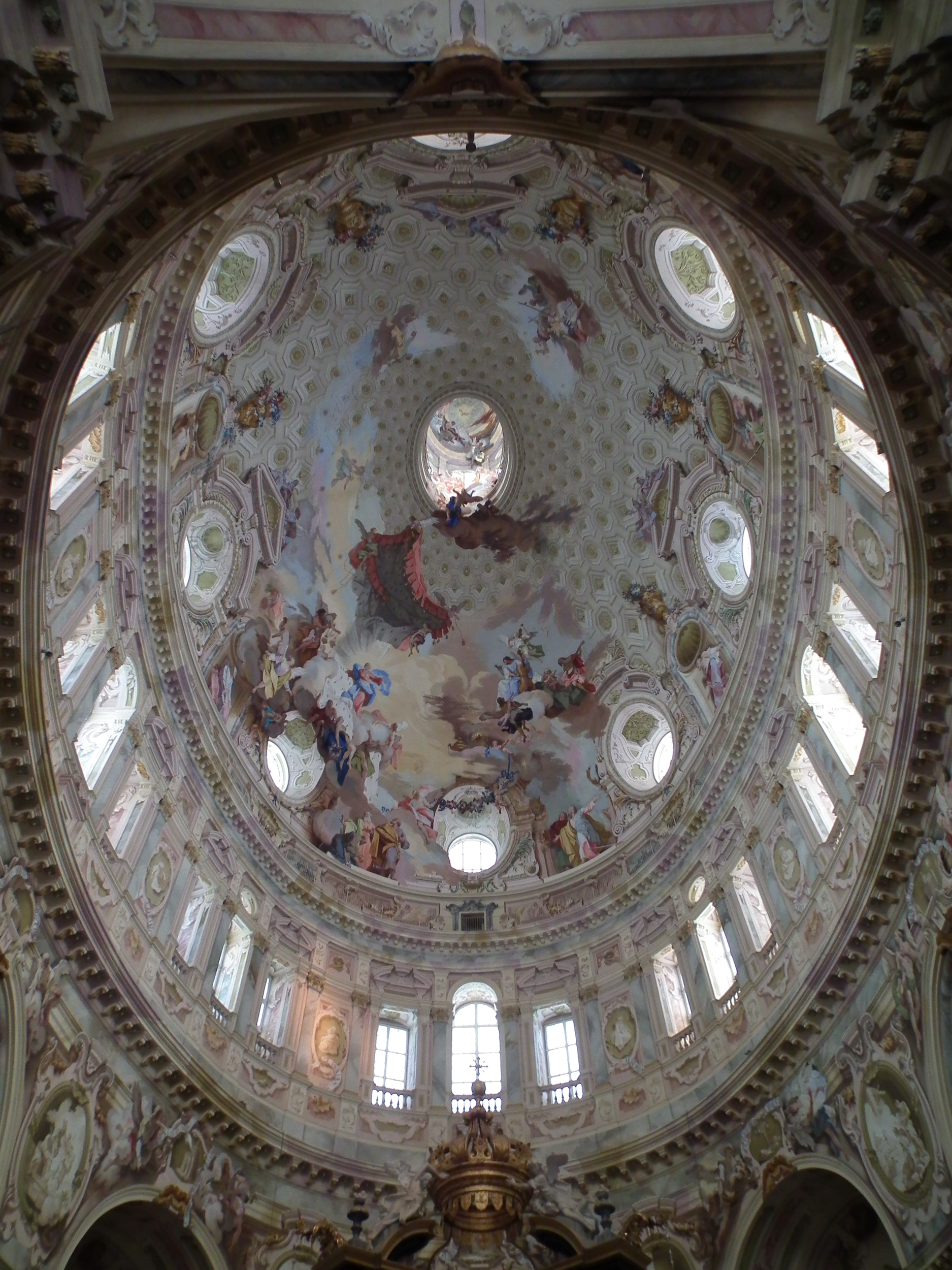
Complete view of ceiling

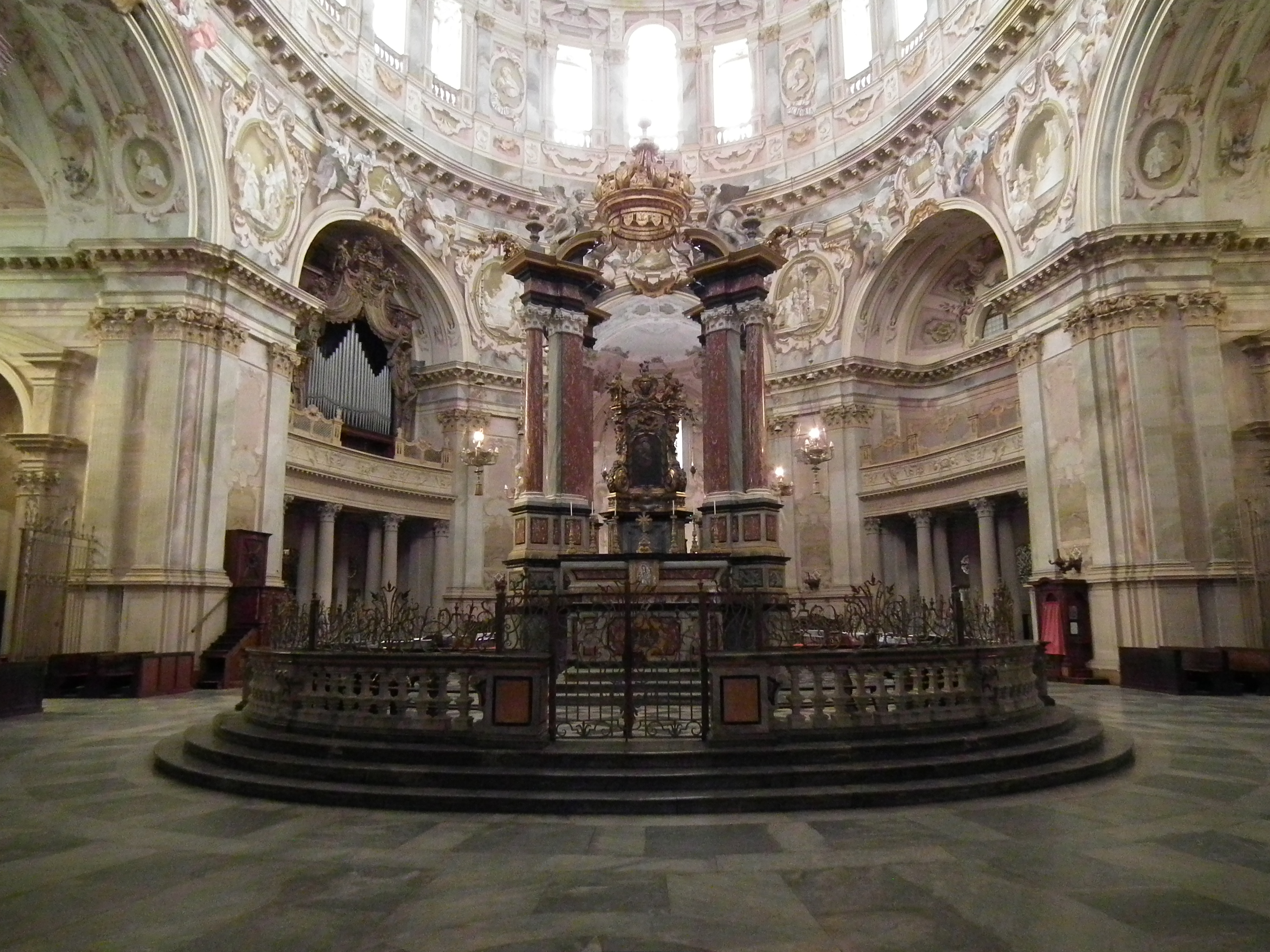
Main Altar
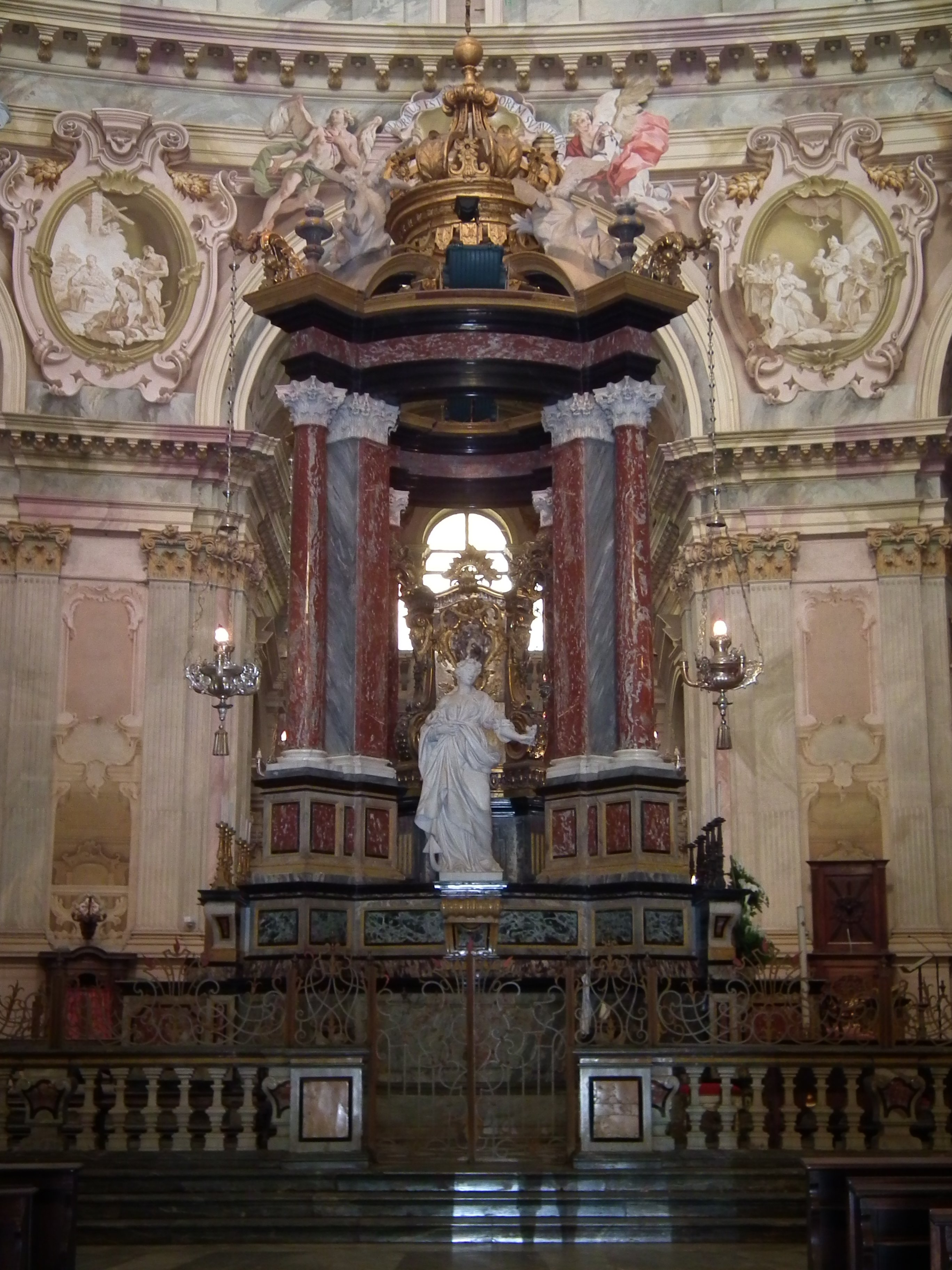
One of the statues on the main altar, representing hope (attribute: anchor)

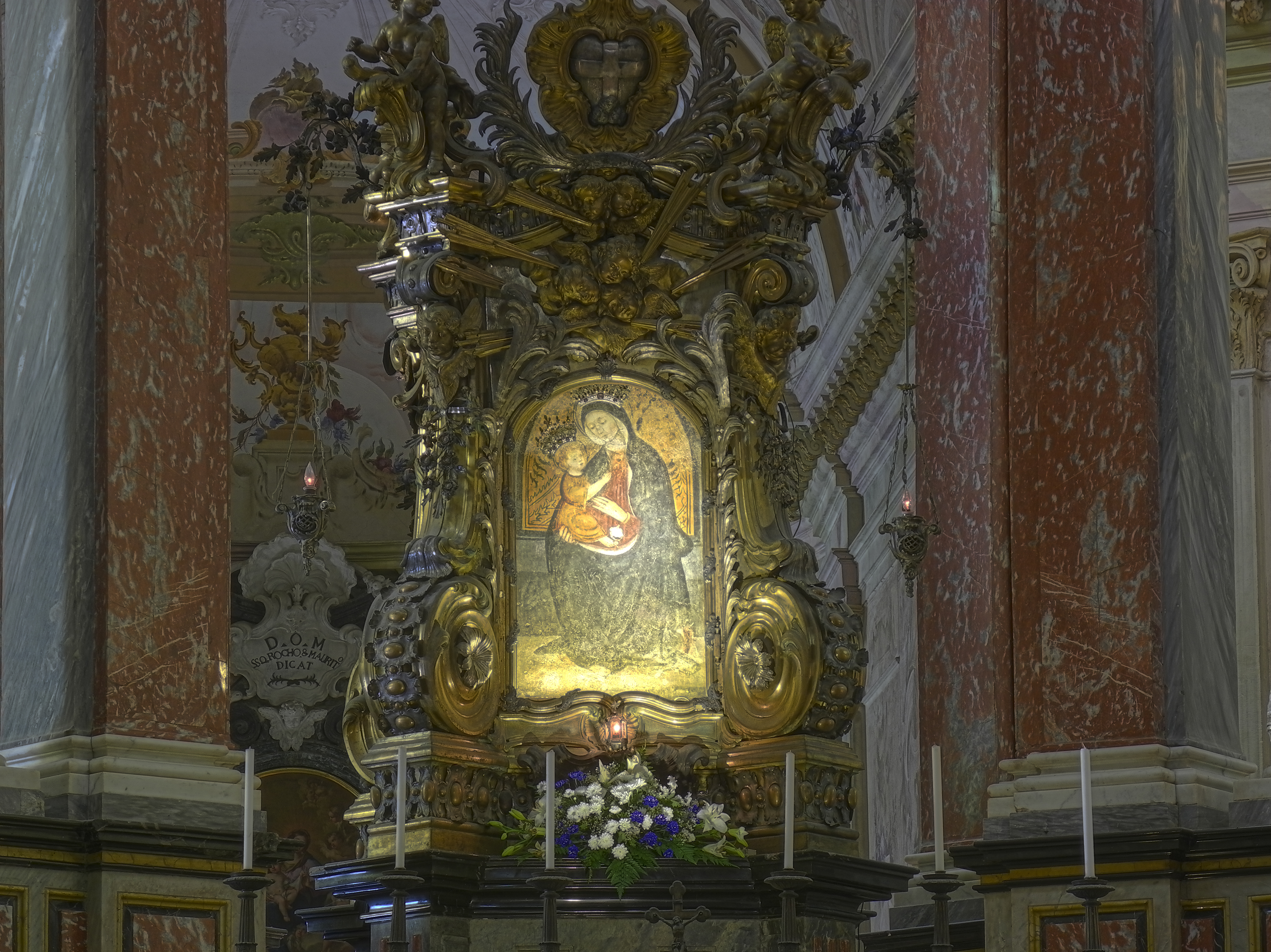
The Holy Icon of the original pylon placed on the main altar

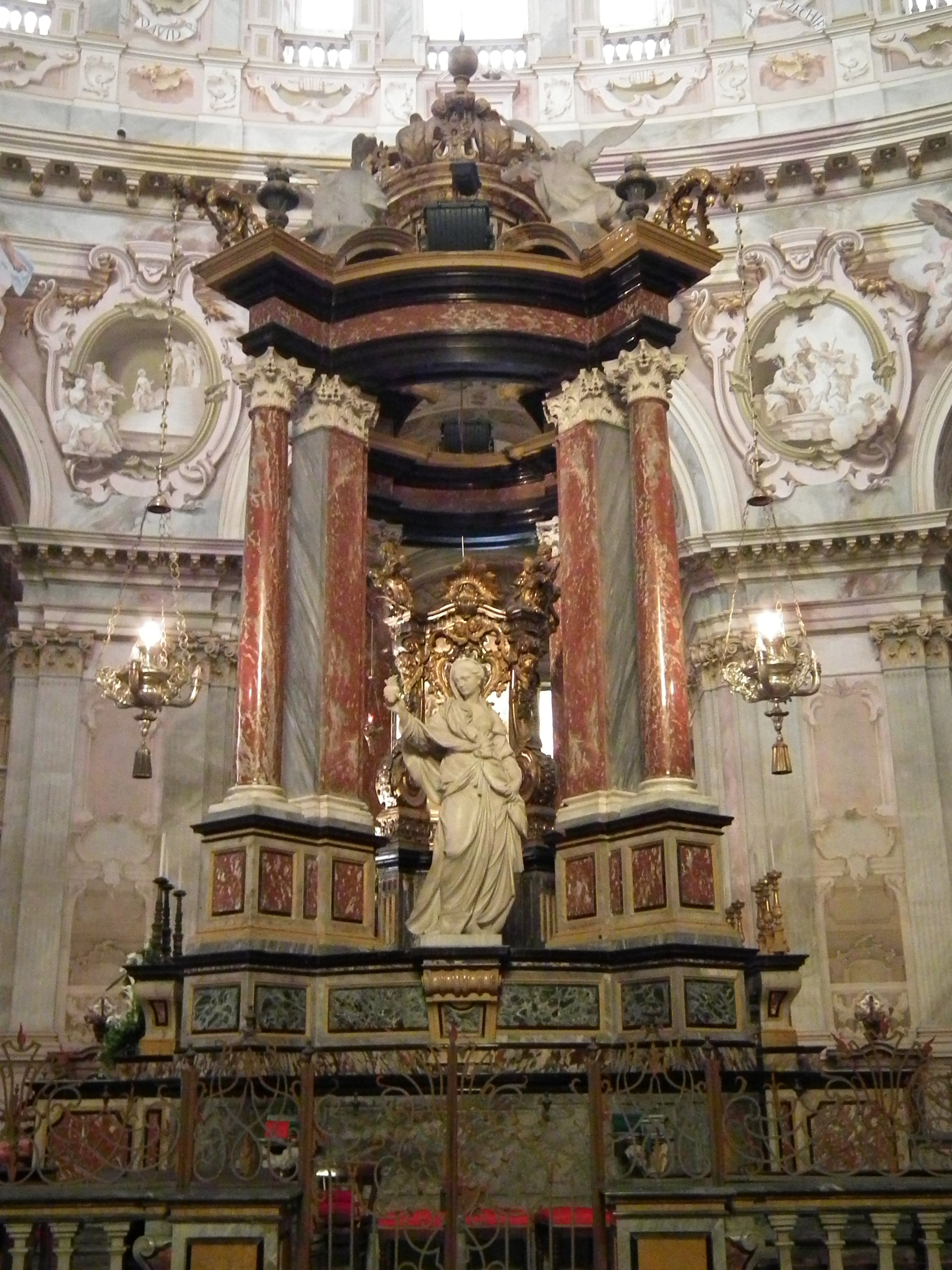
One of the statues on the main altar, representing charity (attribute: burning heart)

== See also ==
- 18th-century Western domes
