= Carlo Giuseppe Plura =

Italian sculptor

Carlo Giuseppe Plura (3 January 1663 – 14 April 1737) was a Swiss-Italian stucco artist and sculptor. He was born in Lugano and died in Borgo San Dalmazzo. His son Giuseppe Antonio Plura the Elder and grandson Giuseppe Plura the Younger were also both sculptors and active in the United Kingdom.

== Works ==
Works by him can be found in Turin (the crucifixion in the Chiesa di San Francesco d'Assisi, The Archangel Gabriel and The Annunciation in the Chiesa della Misericordia), Druento (The Virgin and Child in the parish church of Santa Maria della Stella), Alpignano (wooden crucifixion in the parish church of San Martino di Tours), Carignano, Savigliano CN (The Resurrected Christ), Vasia IM (The Resurrected Christ), Trino (near Lucedio Abbey), Pralormo, Costigliole d'Asti, Saluzzo, Racconigi (altar statuary at San Giovanni Battista) and Moncalieri.

== Bibliography ==
- (in Italian) Luciano Tamburini, Le statue di Carlo Giuseppe Plura, in La Cappella dei Mercanti. Storia e immagini per la storia di una ricca congregazione, Torino 1986.
- (in Italian) Franco Gualano, Il "signor Plura, scultore rarissimo". Un Luganese alla corte sabauda, in Giorgio Mollisi (a cura di), Svizzeri a Torino nella storia, nell'arte, nella cultura, nell'economia dal Cinquecento ad oggi, «Arte&Storia», anno 11, numero 52, ottobre 2011, Edizioni Ticino Management, Lugano 2011, 376–397.
