= Chivasso =

Chivasso Civass
- Comune
- Città di Chivasso
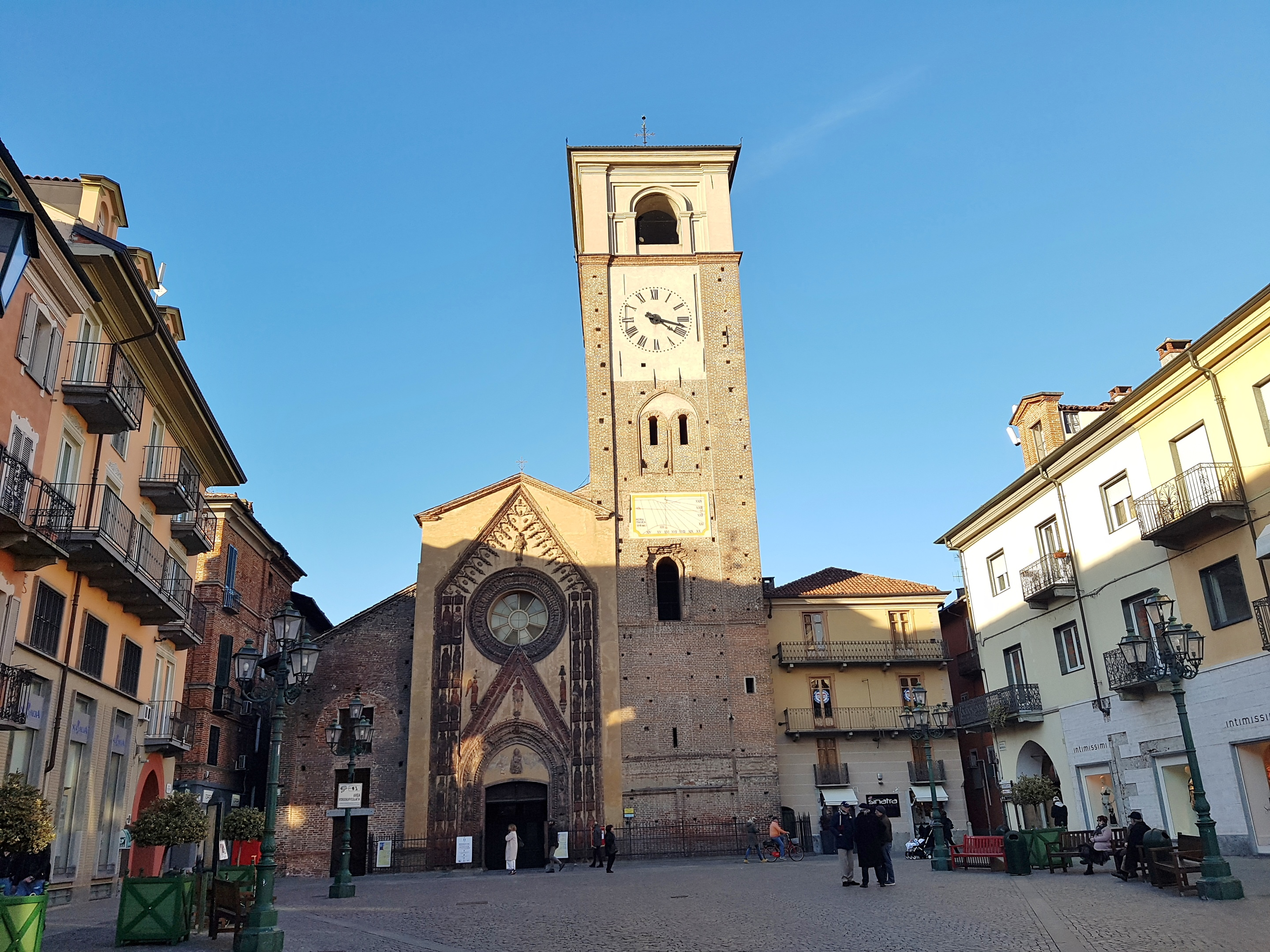
- Chivasso Cathedral

- Coat of arms

- Location within Italy Location within Piedmont
- Coordinates: 45°11′N 7°53′E
- Country: Italy
- Region: Piedmont
- Metropolitan city: Turin (TO)
- Frazioni: Montegiove, Betlemme, Torassi, Castelrosso, Pogliani, Borghetto, Mosche, Mandria, Boschetto, Pratoregio

Government
  - Mayor: Claudio Castello (Lista Civica)

Area
  - Total: 51.31 km^{2} (19.81 sq mi)
- Elevation: 183 m (600 ft)

Population (30 April 2014)
  - Total: 26,795
  - Density: 522.2/km^{2} (1,353/sq mi)
- Demonym: Chivassesi
- Time zone: UTC+1 (CET)
  - Summer (DST): UTC+2 (CEST)
- Postal code: 10034
- Dialing code: 011
- Patron saint: Beato Angelo Carletti di Chivasso
- Website: Official website

Chivasso (pronounced [kiˈvasso]; Piedmontese: Civass) is a comune in the Metropolitan City of Turin, in the Italian region of Piedmont, located about 20 kilometres (12 mi) northeast of Turin. Chivasso has a population of about 27,000. It is situated on the left bank of the Po river, near the influx of the Orco river.

The municipality of Chivasso contains the frazioni (subdivisions, mainly villages and hamlets) Montegiove, Betlemme, Torassi, Castelrosso, Pogliani, Borghetto, Mosche, Mandria, Boschetto, and Pratoregio.

Chivasso borders the following municipalities: Mazzè, Caluso, San Benigno Canavese, Montanaro, Rondissone, Verolengo, Volpiano, Brandizzo, San Sebastiano da Po, Castagneto Po, San Raffaele Cimena.

The name probably has a Roman origin (Clavasium, which is used nowadays by local companies).

== Main sights ==
The 15th-century cathedral has a façade ornamented with statues in terracotta. The 18th-century church of Santa Maria degli Angeli owes some of its design to Bernardo Antonio Vittone.

== Transport ==
Chivasso railway station, opened in 1856, forms part of the Turin–Milan railway, and is also a junction for three other lines, to Aosta, Asti and Casale Monferrato, respectively.

== The Blessed Angelo Carletti di Chivasso ==
Chivasso was the birthplace of the 15th Century theologian Angelo Carletti. The townspeople venerated his memory, as did those of Cuneo where he died, and the cult was recognized by Pope Benedict XIII who Beatified him in 1753. While his feast is officially kept on 12 April, in his native Chivasso he is also celebrated with an old country fair each year at the end of August.

== The Character of the Year ==
The Character of the Year is an annual award by the Chivasso weekly newspaper La Nuova Periferia. It is an award for the people of the area who, in the last year, have distinguished themselves. Established in 2016, that year saw four people awarded, chosen by the newspaper's editorial staff: the motorcyclist Francesco Bagnaia, Matilde Casa, Laura Salvetti and Gianluca Bocca. From the following year the character is chosen based on the vote of the readers. The winners of the editions were:

- For the year 2017 Davide Lingua, director and fashion operator.
- For the year 2018 Francangelo Carra, politician.
- For the year 2019 Pino Battipaglia, showman.
