= Santa Maria degli Angeli, Chivasso =

Church in Chivasso, Italy

Coordinates: 45°11′25″N 7°53′16″E

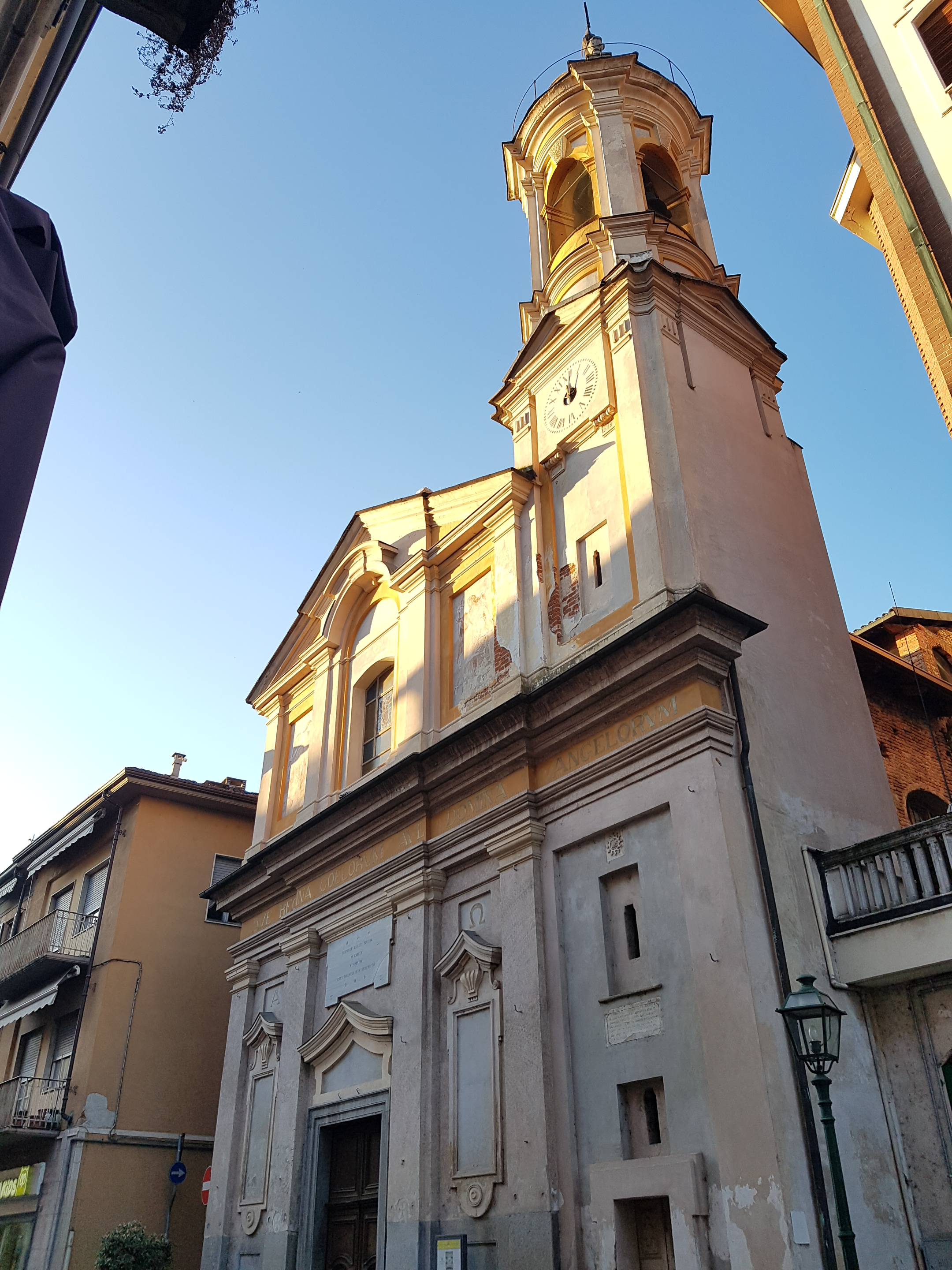

Santa Maria degli Angeli (Holy Mary of the Angels) is a late-Baroque style, Roman Catholic church located in the town of Chivasso located in the Metropolitan City of Turin in the region of Piedmont, Italy.

== History and description ==
A church at this site was completed by 1607 under the patronage of the Confraternity of the Santissimo Nome di Gesù (Holy Name of Jesus). The present church was the product of a refurbishment starting in 1737 under the designs of Bernardo Vittone and his colleague Paolo Lorenzo Garrone. Vittone helped erect, for example, the bell tower (1751-1757). The interior includes a number of canvases painted by Giovanni Battista Grassi and depicting the Life of a young Jesus, as well as two Dominican order priests venerated and honored respectively by the confraternity: St Vincent Ferrer and the Blessed Angelo Carletti da Chivasso. In a niche in the choir is a wooden statuary group carved by Carlo Giuseppe Plura, depicting the Maddona of the Assumption (circa 1713). The church also contains a Gothic style polychrome painted wood Crucifix.
