= Santa Chiara, Turin =

Church of Saint Clare
- Chiesa di Santa Chiara
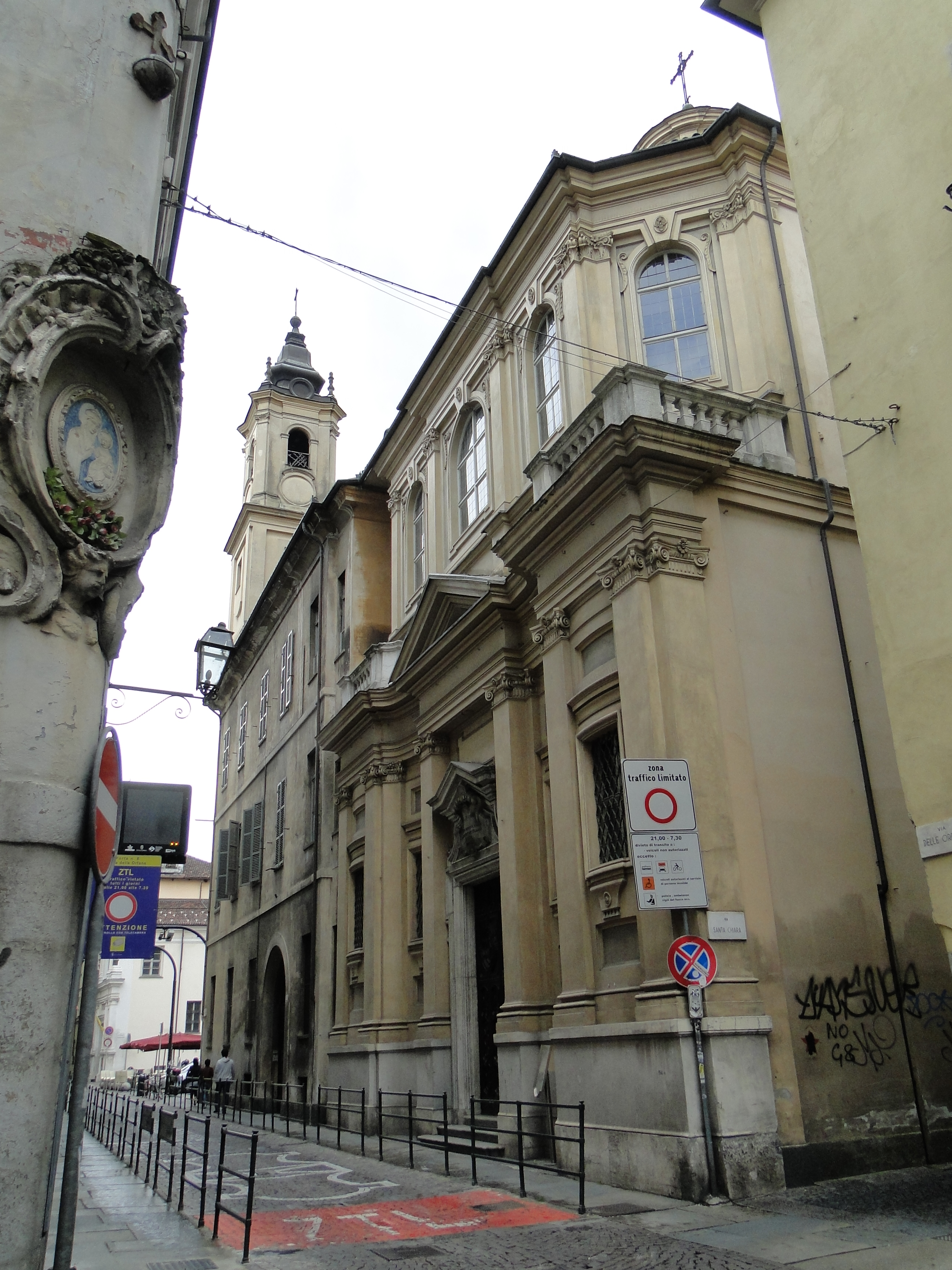
- Façade of the church

- Map of Turin
- 45.075776°N 7.679298°E
- Country: Italy
- Denomination: Roman Catholic Church

History
- Dedication: Clare of Assisi

Architecture
- Architect: Bernardo Antonio Vittone
- Style: Baroque
- Years built: 1742-1745

Administration
- Archdiocese: Turin

The Church of Saint Clare (Italian: Chiesa di Santa Chiara) is a Roman Catholic place of worship located in the city of Turin, Italy.

== History ==
Originally a gothic monastery belonging to the Order of the Poor Clares built in the 13th century, Saint Clare was rebuilt and repurposed as a church, of an overall smaller size, in a baroque style, between 1742 and 1745 under the direction of architect Bernardo Antonio Vittone, himself brother of two nuns of the Order. The Poor Clares would continue to reside in the church until 1814, when they were transferred to Carignano.
