= Santa Maria di Piazza, Turin =

Church of Santa Maria di Piazza
- Chiesa di Santa Maria di Piazza
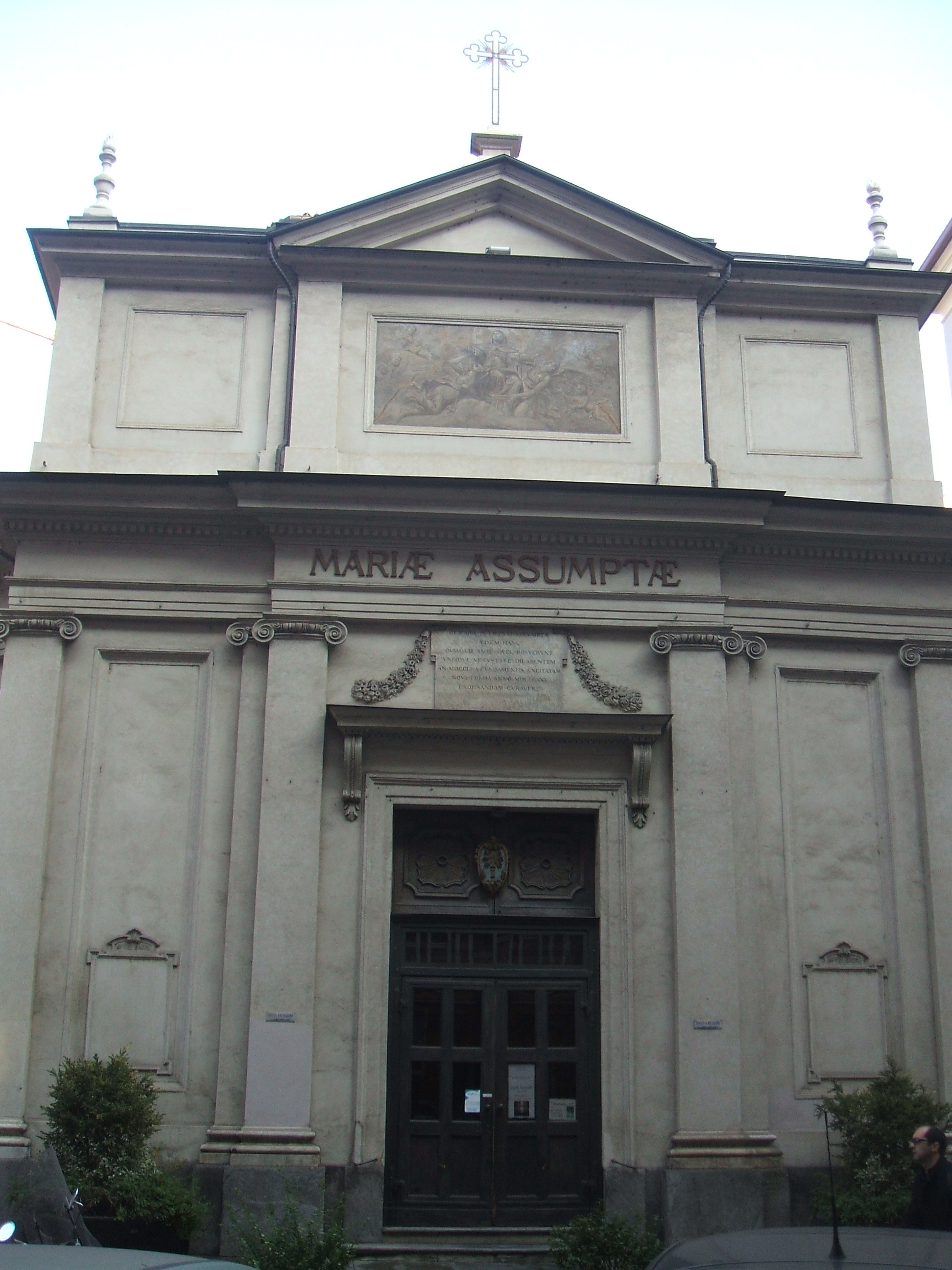
- Façade of the church

- Map of Turin
- 45.07201°N 7.67863°E
- Country: Italy
- Denomination: Roman Catholic Church

History
- Dedication: Mary, Mother of Jesus

Architecture
- Groundbreaking: 1751
- Completed: 1752

Administration
- Archdiocese: Roman Catholic Archdiocese of Turin

Santa Maria di Piazza is a late-Baroque-style church located on via Santa Maria near Via Garibaldi in Central Turin, region of Piedmont, Italy. The church was among the last designs by Bernardo Vittone.

== Description ==
The church was built between 1751 and 1752, originally along an elliptical plan with a complex dome, and consecrated in 1768 by the archbishop of Turin, Francesco Luserna Rorengo di Rorà The addition of two chapels in 1890 altered the layout to resemble more a Greek Cross. The sober neoclassical facade was designed by Barnaba Panizza and added in 1830.

Originally the church was affiliated with the Order of the Discalced Trinitarians, but later it was attached to the confraternities of the Santissimo Viatico and later the Sacro Cuore di Gesù (Holy Heart of Jesus). At the beginning of the 19th century it was affiliated with the Society of Saint Vincent de Paul. In 1910, the church was named a sanctuary and proclaimed a national monument.

== Interior ==
The first altar on the right has an altarpiece depicting the Baptism of Christ by Michele Antonio Milocco, while the altar on the left has an altarpiece depicting the Holy Family by Mattia Franceschini. The main altarpiece depicts the Assumption of the Virgin by Pietro Francesco Guala.
