= San Michele Arcangelo, Borgo d'Ale =

Church building in Borgo d'Ale, Italy

Coordinates: 45°20′58″N 8°03′12″E

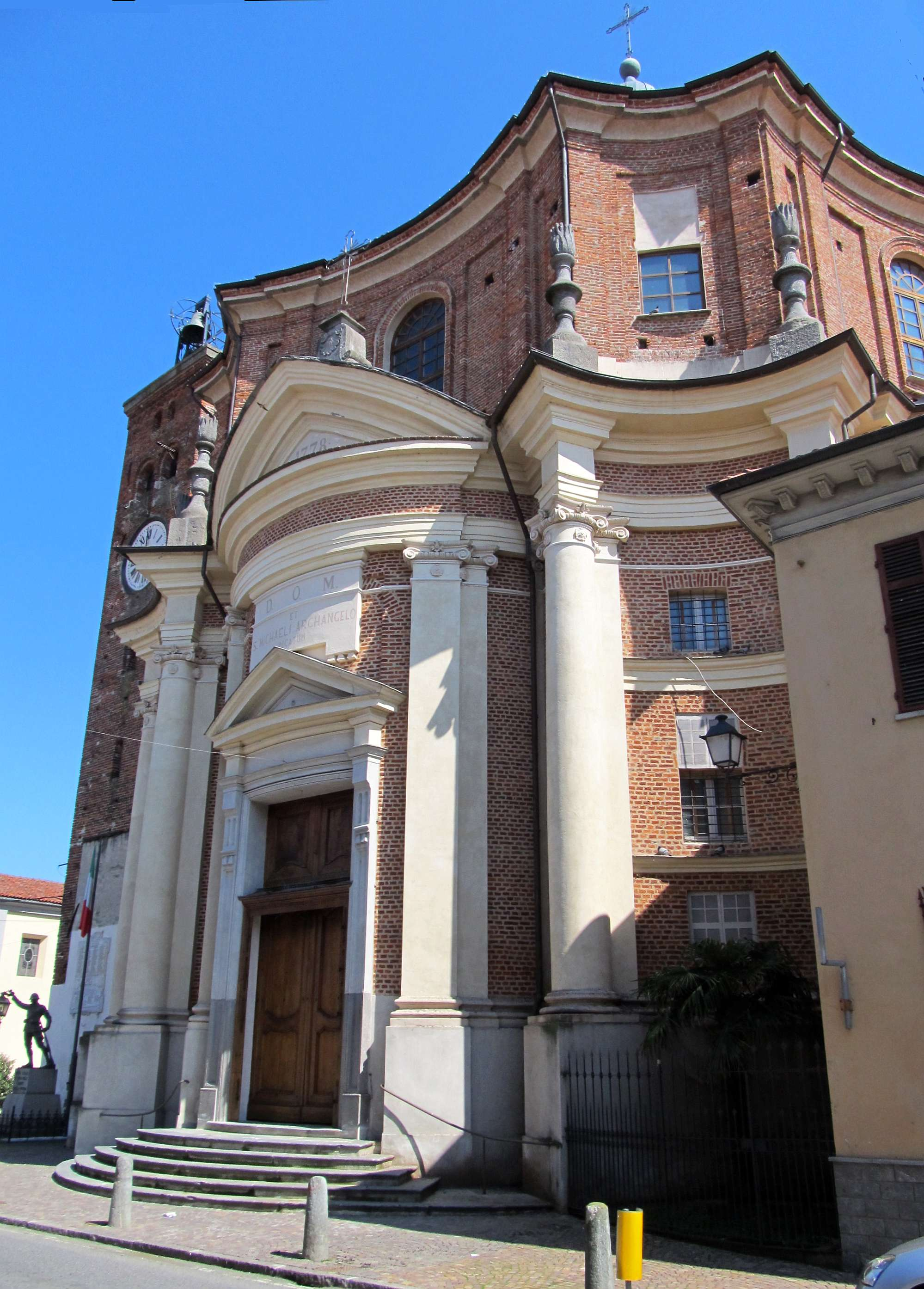
Facade

San Michele Arcangelo (St Michael Archangel) is a Baroque-style, Roman Catholic church located in the town of Borgo d'Ale, province of Vercelli, region of Piedmont, Italy. An older church dedicated to St Michael, a common entitlement for Lombard churches, rises in a rural site south of town in Clivolo, a neighborhood encompassed in the town limits of Borgo d'Ale.

This was one of the last designs by the architect Bernardo Vittone, completed posthumously from 1771 to 1778. The facade has a Borrominesque play of concave and convex elements. To the right is an older campanile, refurbished in subsequent centuries. The layout of this church includes a centralized nave with a separate circular presbytery framed by a separate colonnade, creating a separate space for the altar. From the nave emerge four chapels: the first on the left dedicated to the souls in purgatory, the second, to the Virgin of the Rosary. On the right, nearest the entrance is the altar dedicated to St Sebastian, patron of Borgo d'Ale, and the final chapel is dedicated to St Joseph in Agony. Throughout the church are depictions of the militant St Michael, including in the oaken pulpit, in a statue to the right of the main altar, and in the main altarpiece. Behind the main altar is the rectangular choir with oaken stalls. Above the center of the nave is a well-lit hexagonal central dome.
