= Santi Vincenzo e Anastasio church, Cambiano =

Church building in Cambiano, Italy

Coordinates: 44°58′26″N 7°46′48″E

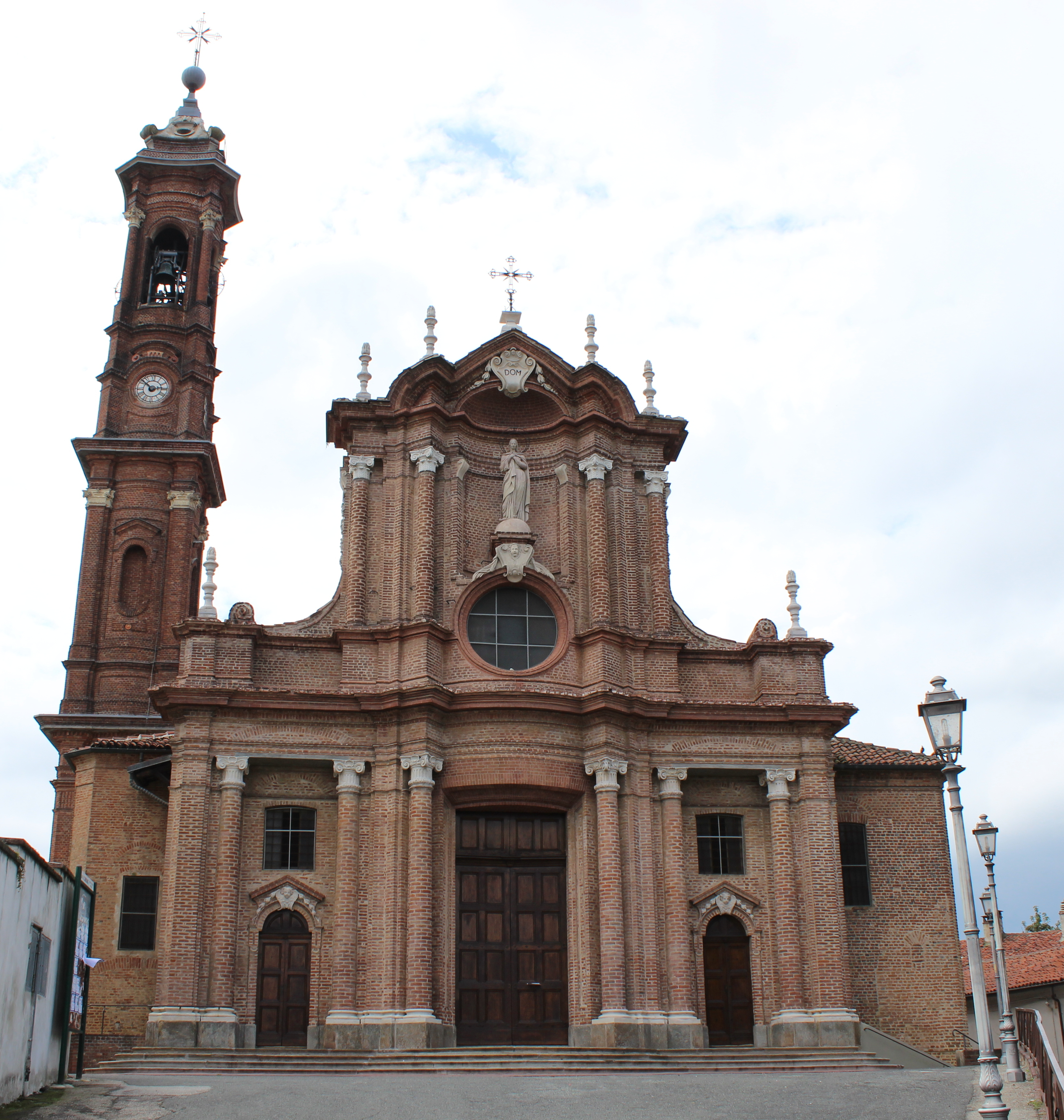
Facade and bell-tower

Santi Vincenzo e Anastasio (St Vincent and Anasthasius) is a late-Baroque style, Roman Catholic parish church located in the town of Cambiano, in the Metropolitan City of Turin in the region of Piedmont, Italy. The church was designed Piedmontese architect Bernardo Vittone.

== History and description ==
A parish church, existing in 1094, was dedicated only to St Vincent, and only in 1344–1345, after the battle of Gamenario, was the dedication to St Anastasius added. In the 14th century, the church was rebuilt in a gothic style. Refurbishments in the 16th century altered the layout to a more centralized Greek cross and in 1559 added the choir. In 1744, Bernardo Vittone was commissioned to refurbish the facade as we see it presently; he also erected the belltower, which was restored and modified in 1874. The interior retains a baptismal font from 1474.
