= Michele Antonio Milocco =

Italian painter

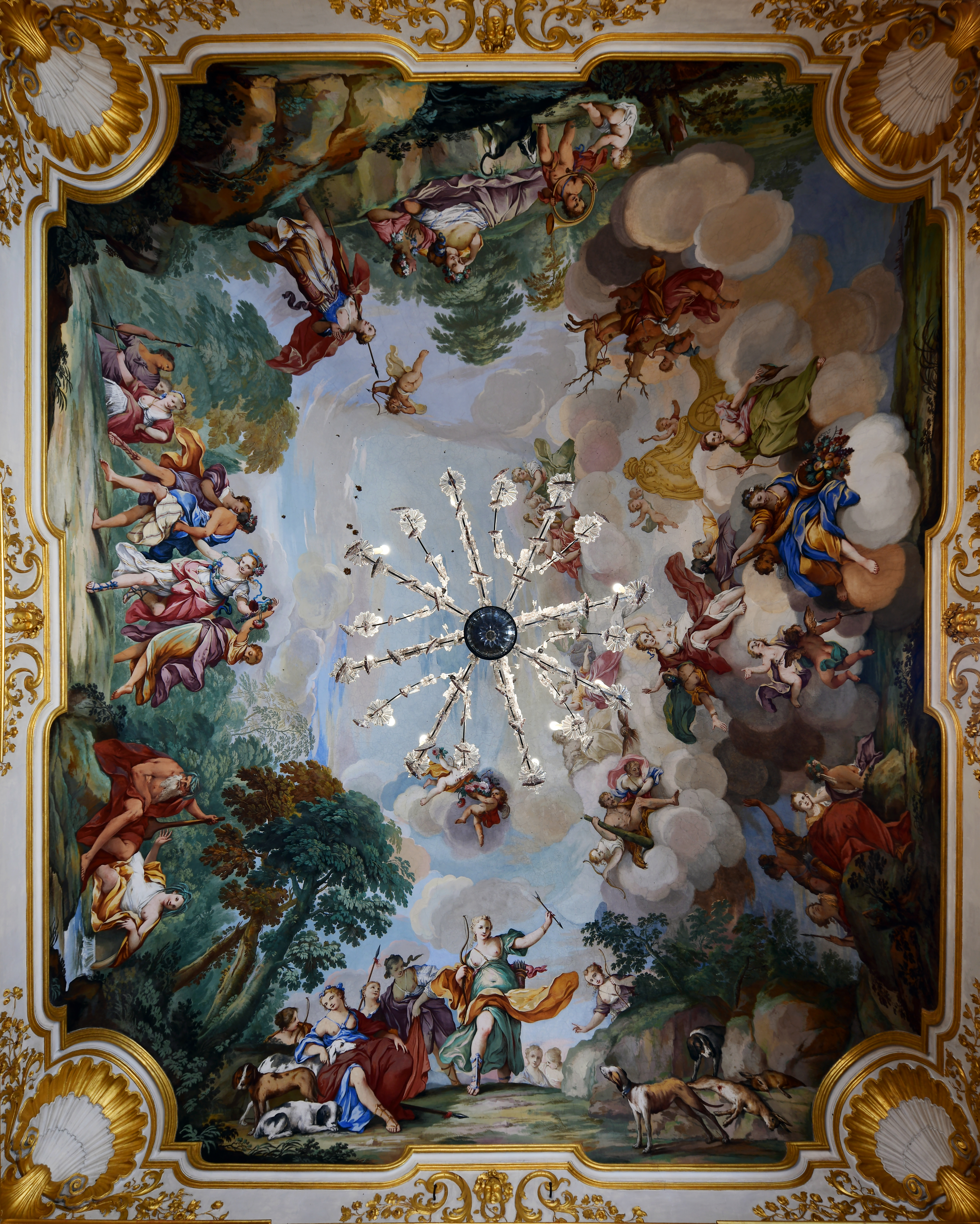
Michele Antonio Milocco: The myth of Diana, 1731, ceiling in the apartment of the King, Palazzina di caccia di Stupinigi

Michele Antonio Milocco (1690 – circa 1772) was an Italian painter of the late-Baroque period.

He worked mainly in the Piedmont. Among his works were frescoes painted in the King's chamber of the Palazzina di Caccia di Stupinigi (Royal Hunting Lodge at Stupinigi). He also collaborated with Claudio Beaumont of Turin in the decoration of the church of San Fillipo Neri in Fossano. He painted the dome of the small Vittone church of Santa Maria Maddalena, Alba.
