= Carlo Felice Biscarra =

Italian painter (1823–1894)

Carlo Felice Biscarra (March 26, 1823 – July 31, 1894) was an Italian painter and art critic.

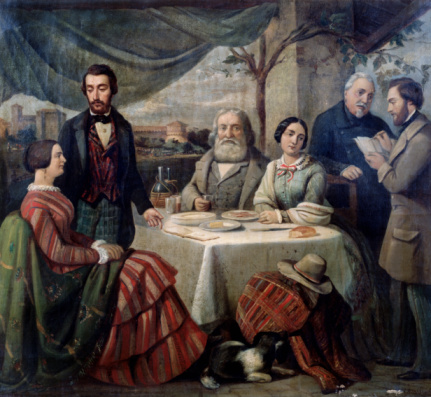
Meeting with Garibaldi

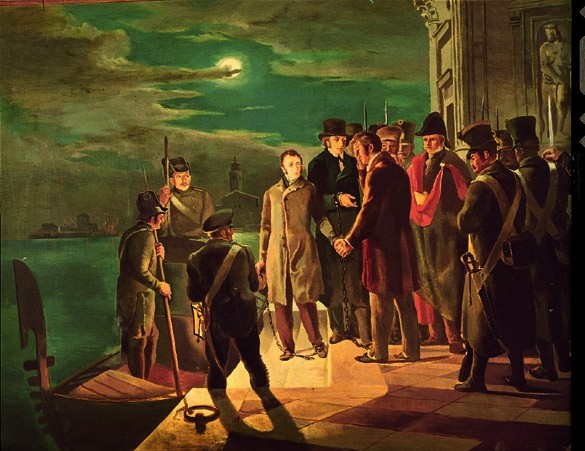
Arrest of Silvio Pellico and Piero Maroncelli

Born in Turin, then in the Kingdom of Sardinia, Carlo Felice initially trained with his father, Giovanni Battista, who was director of the Accademia Albertina. Carlo Felice received a pension from the Queen to study in Florence and Rome. In 1850, his first canvas Cola di Rienzo harangues the People of Rome was displayed and much admired at an exhibition at Castello del Valentino. Other works include Galileo Galilei before the Tribunal of the Inquisition; the Brothers Zuccato, Mosaicists (and tutors of Titian, in a Venetian Jail; Fanfulla addresses the armies in defense of Florence; Filippo Lippi in Barbary draws his captors; Giovanni Bellini discovers the secrets of oil painting; recato in Italia da Antonello di Messina; Maso Finiguerra learns how to engrave with burin; Youth of Carmagnola; The infancy of Lodovico Muratori; Silvio Pellico che dalle carceri di Murano s'avvia allo Spielberg; Giordano Bruno in Jail; Loves of the Angels; Medoro; Graziella; Desdemona; Clarino; The old street of Cenisio Capo Noli; and Pesca ai polipi.

He traveled through Europe, and in Paris worked with the painter Ary Scheffer. In 1860 under Massimo d'Azeglio, he became secretary of the Accademia Albertina. He also helped found the Circolo degli Artisti di Torino, a painters' association. He collaborated with Luigi Rocca to publish the magazine L'Arte in Italia for five years till 1873. Biscarra translated a course of industrial and artistic design by G. Schreiber, and published on the history of the Academy and of the main works in the Royal Pinacoteca of Turin. He sponsored photography of the archeologic sites of the Piedmont. He died in Turin in 1894.
