= Santi Bernardino e Rocco, Chieri =

Roman Catholic church in Chieri, Italy

Coordinates: 45°0′51.8″N 7°49′27.9″E

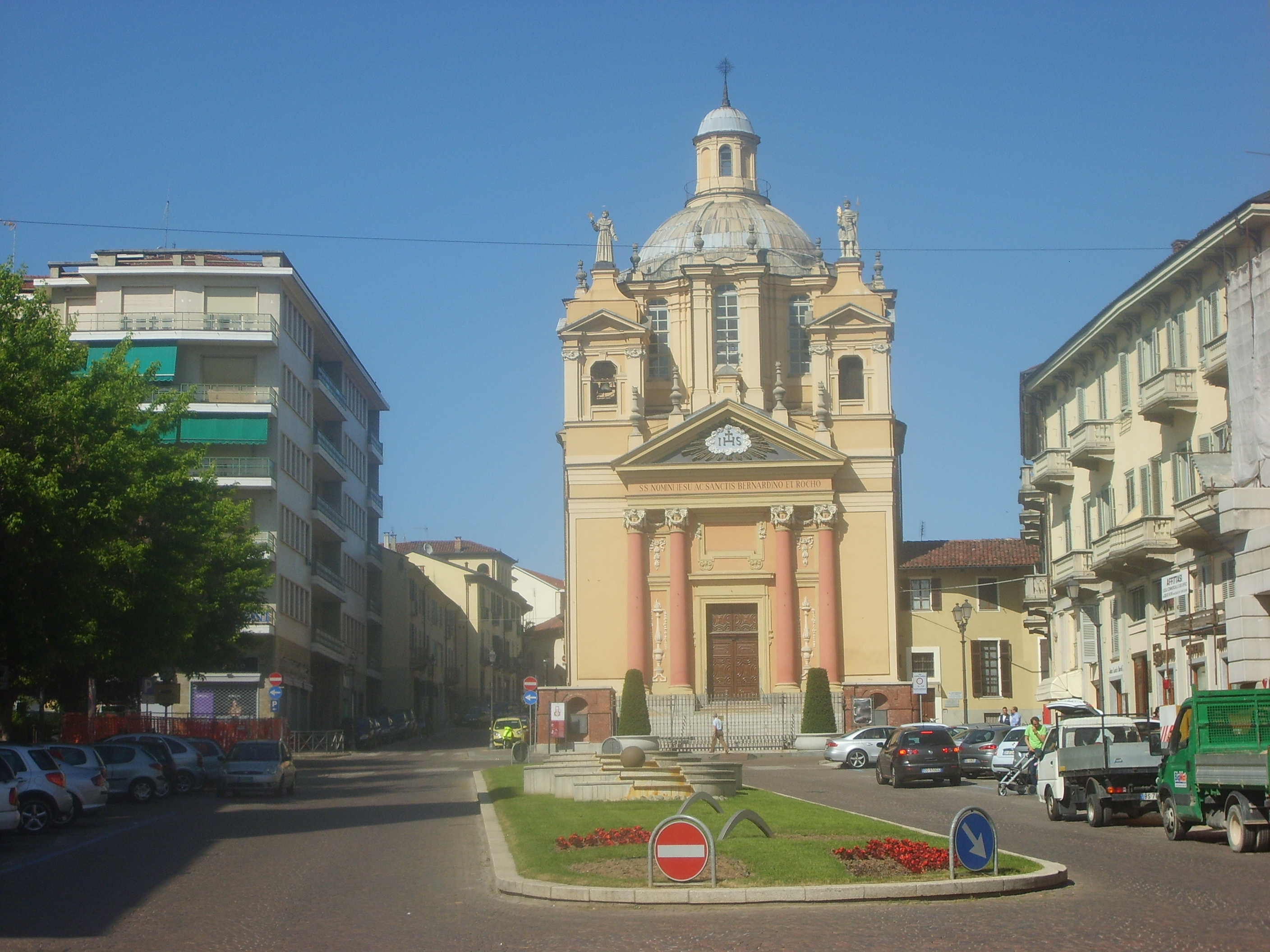

Santi Bernardino e Rocco is a Roman Catholic church located in Piazza Cavour, in the town of Chieri, Province of Turin, region of Piedmont, Italy.

== History ==
The Neoclassical facade with a prominent vertical emphasis with two bell towers, each topped by a statue of a saint, was designed in 1792 by Mario Quarini, and the church has a dome (1740–44) by Bernardo Vittone. The interior is decorated with Rococo stucco by Giuseppe Antonio Riva. The main altarpiece is a depiction of the Virgin and Child with St Bernardino da Siena by Guglielmo Caccia. It is claimed St Bernardino preached in this town. The organ, recently restored is the oldest in Chieri.

On the right of the organ is a canvas depicting the Trinity and Coronation of the Virgin by Guglielmo Caccia, known as il Moncalvo, a work originating from the no longer extant church of Santi Rocco, Sebastiano, Giorgio e Guglielmo. The canvas has a depiction of the town of Chieri. In the adjacent council room, is a third canvas by il Moncalvo, this one depicting the Life of St Nicola da Tolentino. The Church. The church is maintained by the Confraternity of the Santissimo Nome di Gesù.
