= Capella di Arciconfraternita Santa Croce, Caramagna Piemonte =

Church building in Caramagna Piemonte, Italy

Coordinates: 44°46′49″N 7°44′21″E

Santa Croce is a late-Baroque style, Roman Catholic small church or oratory located in the town of Caramagna Piemonte, in the Province of Cuneo in the region of Piedmont, Italy. The main altar of this small church was designed by the Piedmontese architect Bernardo Vittone.

== History and description ==
A compagnia (akin to a fraternity) of lay flagellants began construction of this religious structure at the site of a bastions that flanked one (the Porta Nova) of the medieval gates of the town. Likely a chapel of the oratory of Santa Croce was previously sited here. The project was designed in 1668 by Francesco Lanfranchi and cost about 14,000 lire, of which the commune only paid 2,650 while the rest was paid by patrons. In 1673, Carlo Gallo helped decorate the windows and niches. The bell tower was completed in 1706. The interior choir stalls were begun in 1714. That year the church was attached to the Arciconfraternita del Santo Crocifisso (Arch-Confraternity of the Holy Cross).

In 1736, the polychrome main altar was designed and built by Vittone. The balustrade was completed in 1762 by Giuseppe Aubert. In the interior are various artworks including a crucifix by Carlo Giuseppe Plura of Lugano. In the choir is a depiction of the Death of St Francis Xavier by Giulio Cesare Merlo. In the presbytery are also canvases depicting (on the left) the Sacra Sindone, Margherita di Cipro and Ludovico I; and on the right, the Blessed Margherita of Savoy, the blessed Bernard of Baden, and the Blessed Amedeo of Savoy. In the Lunette above a cross was painted by Paolo Emilio Morgari. Much of the interior decoration was completed by Bernardino Borelli and his brothers from Bra circa 1817, and has undergone restoration. The altar of Christ to the right of the main altar was designed in 1768 in an elliptical shape by Domenico De Martino.
