= Santuario Sant'Ignazio, Pessinetto =

Church in Pessinetto, Italy

Coordinates: 45°16′41″N 7°26′29″E

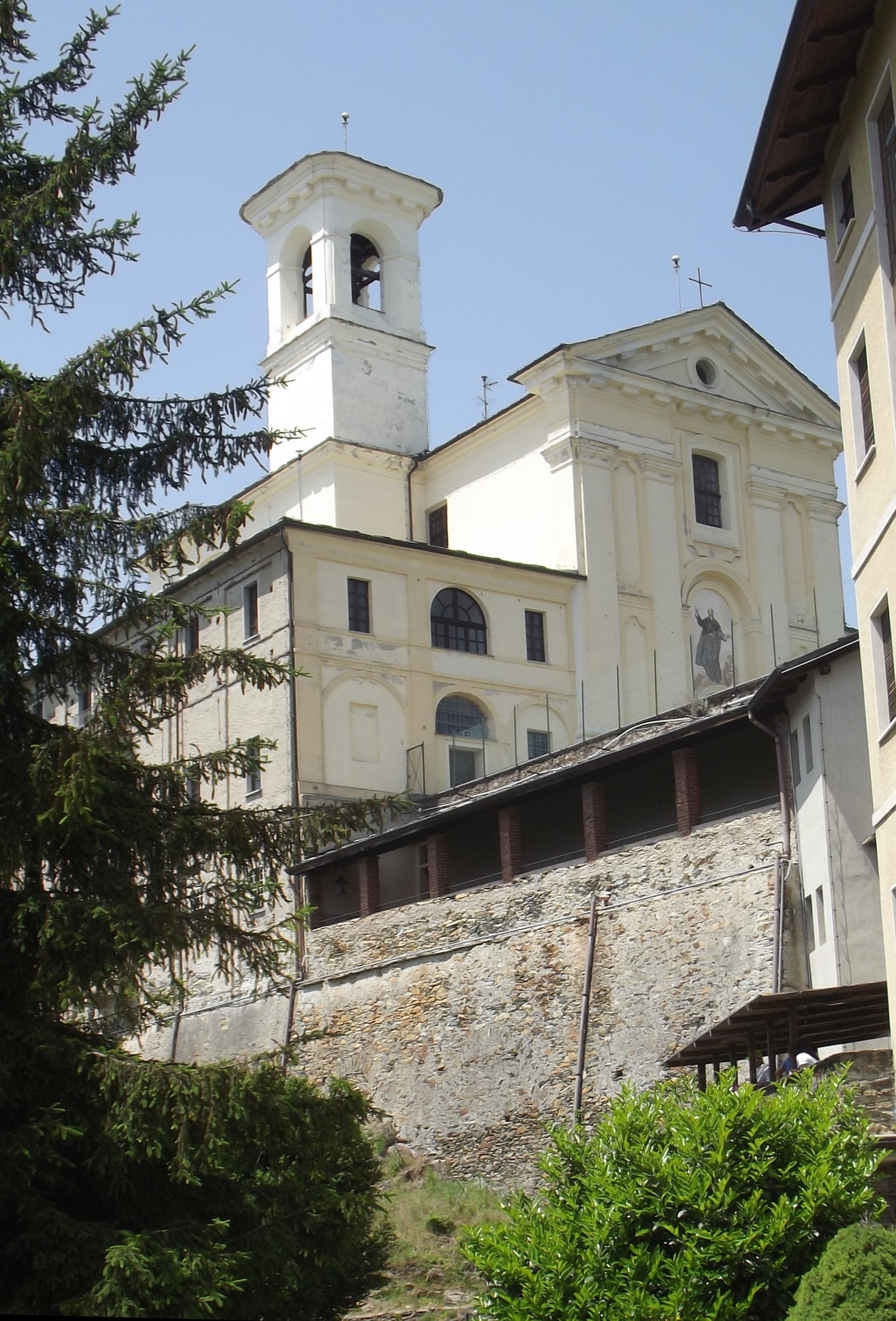

The Santuario Sant'Ignazio is a Neoclassic-style, Roman Catholic sanctuary church located atop a mountain looming over the Valli di Lanzo, and within the town limits of Pessinetto, in the Metropolitan City of Turin, region of Piedmont, Italy. The hilltop location recalls the Sacra di San Michele located atop Mount Pirchiriano, situated on the south side of the Val di Susa in the territory of the municipality of Sant'Ambrogio di Torino. The property is still used for spiritual retreats.

== History ==
The official site of the sanctuary states that in 1626, wolf pack attacked both some flocks of sheep and the children herding them. Putatively a novena, including prayers to the recently canonized Ignatius of Loyola was thought to have caused the wolves to leave. A chapel was built here by 1629. This prodded the villagers to erect a sanctuary atop the mountain of Bastia. Putatively, in 1630 the Saint himself miraculously appeared before a peasant girl and her husband at the site of the sanctuary.

In 1676, the land for the sanctuary was acquired and a centralized sanctuary was built under the rule of the Jesuits. The Jesuit order was temporarily suppressed in 1773, and in 1789, the sanctuary became property of the Archbishop of Turin. A Franciscan order became attached to the property. In the first decades of the 19th century, the church was refurbished to its present Neoclassical design. Inside the church are two rock piles, one is the virtual peak of the mountain and the main altar, and the second hold statue of St Ignatius. Bernardo Vittone helped design the altar.
