= Santa Chiara, Bra =

Church building in Bra, Italy

Coordinates: 44°42′00″N 7°51′12″E

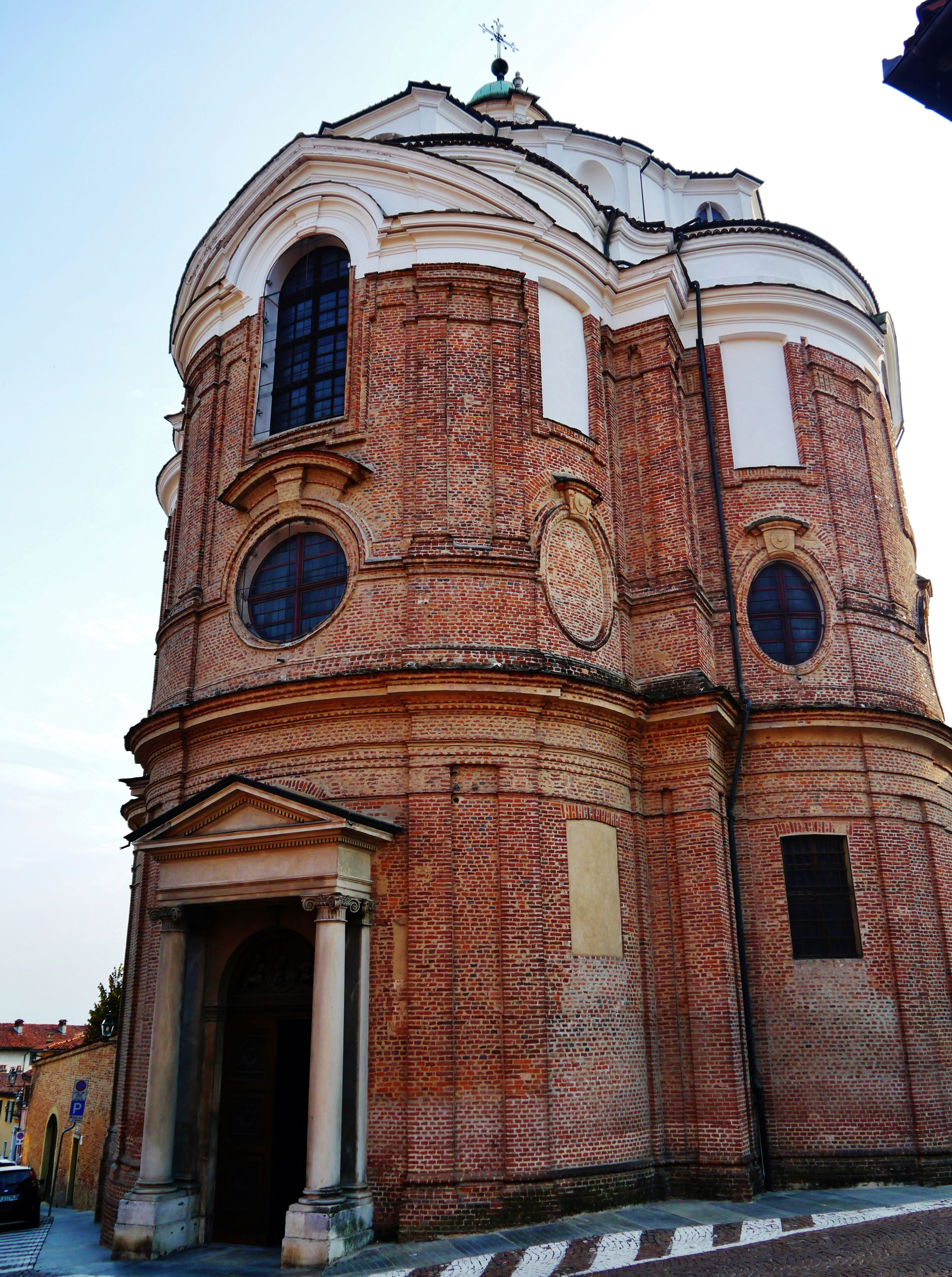
Exterior view of Santa Chiara

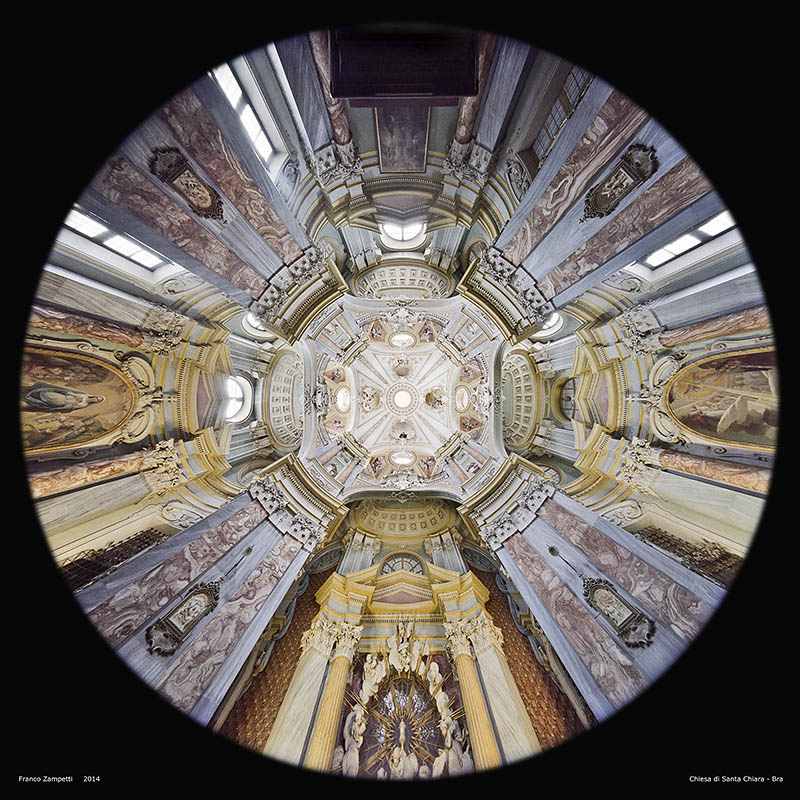
Interior view of cupola

Santa Chiara is a Roman Catholic church located on Via Barbacana, 49 in the town of Bra, province of Cuneo, region of Piedmont, northern Italy. The small domed church was designed by the late-Baroque architect Bernardo Antonio Vittone.

== History ==
A community of Clarissan nuns was assembled in Bra by 1632, and were attended by a nearby church until this structure was built. Begun in 1742, it was consecrated for services by August 1, 1748. Work continued on the church until 1786.

By 1802, the monastery was suppressed, and the property, including the church, was not returned to the nuns until 1816. The monastery was confiscated again in 1883. In 1930, the church was granted to the Capuchin Fathers, but finally passed to the Municipality of Bra.

Santa Chiara has a four-lobed central plan set on large pillars that support a complex dome, perforated by windows. The altars were completed in the 20th century. The main altar is overlooked by a large stucco medallion depicting the Glory of the Eucharist with revering angels and nuns. The lateral altars (1943) were decorated by Piero Dalle Ceste. The altar on the left depicts the Immaculate Conception with three Franciscan saints Fedele da Sigmaringa, Veronica Giuliani, and Louis King of France; on the right, St Francis of Assisi in ecstasy.

Di Pietro Paolo Operti (1704-1793) painted the frescoes on the second level. The dome was frescoed by Pietro Dalle Ceste, depicting St Francis blessing Saint Ignatius of Santhià and Cardinal Guglielmo Massaja.

The main altar also has a painting by Giovanni Claret, depicting the Madonna with Child and Saint Joseph, with Saint Anthony of Padua, San Bernardino of Siena and San Diego d'Alcantara.
