= Santa Maria della Neve, Pecetto Torinese =

Church building in Pecetto Torinese, Italy

Coordinates: 45°01′00″N 7°44′59″E

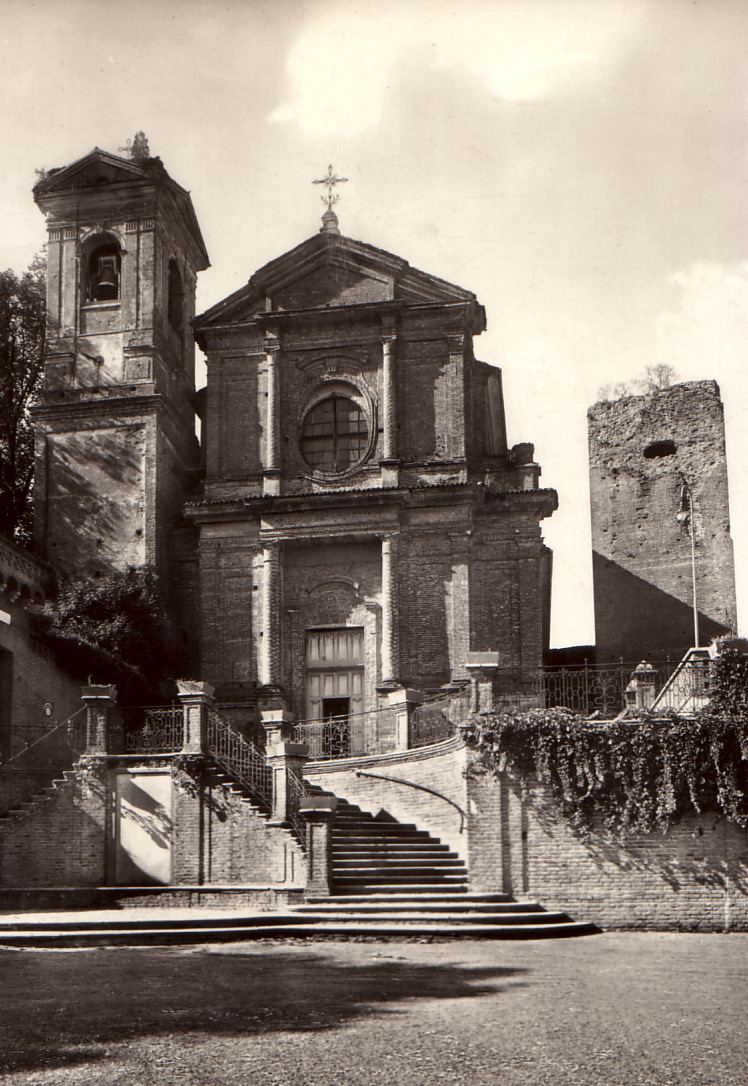

Santa Maria della Neve (St Mary of the Snows) is a late-Baroque style, Roman Catholic parish church located in the town of Pecetto Torinese, in the Metropolitan City of Turin in the region of Piedmont, Italy. The small church, designed in 1730, was one of the first works of the Piedmontese architect Bernardo Vittone.

== History and description ==
The parish church was erected from 1739 to 1742. The church has a conventional nave with six lateral altars. The main altar, work of Francesco Dellala di Beinasco, was derived from a former nearby hermitage. The main altarpiece depicts a Virgin and Child with an Angel and St Grato, St Sebastian, and St Hyacinth (1783) painted by Vittorio Amedeo Raptus. Other altarpieces in the church depict St Ursula and the Virgins, Souls in Purgatory, Saints Antimo and Ferrario. The organ in the church dates to 1778. From the front of the church is a view of surrounding hills and villas.
