= Barnaba Panizza =

Italian architect

Barnaba Panizza (1806 – 1895) was an Italian architect, active mainly in Piedmont. He affixed the Neoclassical facade on the late-Baroque church of Santa Maria di Piazza, Turin. He was born in Turin, and active mainly since 1840. He also served as a lawyer and assessor of public works for the Comune of Turin from 1860 to 1865.
