= Villanova Mondovì =

- Comune
- Comune di Villanova Mondovì
- Location within Italy Location within Piedmont
- Coordinates: 44°21′N 7°46′E
- Country: Italy
- Region: Piedmont
- Province: Province of Cuneo (CN)

Area
  - Total: 28.4 km^{2} (11.0 sq mi)
- Elevation: 526 m (1,726 ft)

Population (31 July 2010)
  - Total: 5,820
  - Density: 205/km^{2} (531/sq mi)
- Time zone: UTC+1 (CET)
  - Summer (DST): UTC+2 (CEST)
- Postal code: 12089
- Dialing code: 0174
- Patron saint: Beata Vergine Addolorata
- Saint day: 15 September
- Website: http://www.comune.villanova-mondovi.cn.it/

Villanova Mondovì is a comune (municipality) in the Province of Cuneo in the Italian region Piedmont, located about 96 kilometres (60 mi) south of Turin and about 20 kilometres (12 mi) east of Cuneo. As of 31 December 2004, it had a population of 5,506 and an area of 28.4 square kilometres (11.0 mi^{2}).

Villanova Mondovì borders the following municipalities: Chiusa di Pesio, Frabosa Sottana, Monastero di Vasco, Mondovì, Pianfei, and Roccaforte Mondovì.

Among the sights is the Church of the Contraternity of Holy Cross designed by Bernardo Vittone.

== Demographic evolution ==
Historical population

Year	Pop.	±%
1861	3,684	—
1871	3,918	+6.4%
1881	4,101	+4.7%
1901	3,813	−7.0%
1911	4,057	+6.4%

Year	Pop.	±%
1921	3,841	−5.3%
1931	3,898	+1.5%
1936	3,637	−6.7%
1951	3,659	+0.6%
1961	3,359	−8.2%

Year	Pop.	±%
1971	3,660	+9.0%
1981	4,323	+18.1%
1991	4,757	+10.0%
2001	5,445	+14.5%
2010	5,820	+6.9%

Source: Data from ISTAT
