= Confraternita di Santa Croce, Villanova Mondovì =

Church in Cuneo, Italy

Coordinates: 44°20′38″N 7°45′21″E

The Church of the Contraternity of Holy Cross (Italian: Chiesa della Confraternita di Santa Croce) is a former Roman Catholic oratory or small church located in Via Monte Calvario #16 of the town of Villanova Mondovì, province of Cuneo, region of Piedmont, Italy.

The late Baroque-style building (1755) with a curvilinear lateral flanks of the brick facade and elaborate dome was designed by Bernardo Vittone and Francesco Gallo. The layout of this oratory is centralized with an octagonal central dome. It lies across the street from the more ancient church of Santa Caterina.
