= San Luigi Gonzaga, Corteranzo =

Church in Corteranzo, Piedmont, Italy

Coordinates: 45°06′01″N 8°07′11″E

The Church of San Luigi Gonzaga (Italian: Chiesa di San Luigi Gonzaga) is a Roman Catholic church dedicated to Saint Aloysius Gonzaga and located in the rural locality of Corteranzo near the town of Murisengo in the Province of Alessandria in the region of Piedmont, Italy. The small church was designed in 1738 by the prominent Piedmontese architect Bernardo Vittone.

== History and description ==
The erection of a small church at this rural location, presumably to replace a small chapel or hermitage, took place under the patronage of Tommaso Giunipero, an aristocrat residing in the Villa of Corteranzo. Documents suggest that plans began in the early 18th century but that the building was only completed in 1760, posthumously using designs of Vittone. While the exterior appears somewhat rusticated with worn brick, the interior has a complex hexagonal cupola.
