= Paola Gambara Costa =

Blessed Paola Gambara Costa TOSF
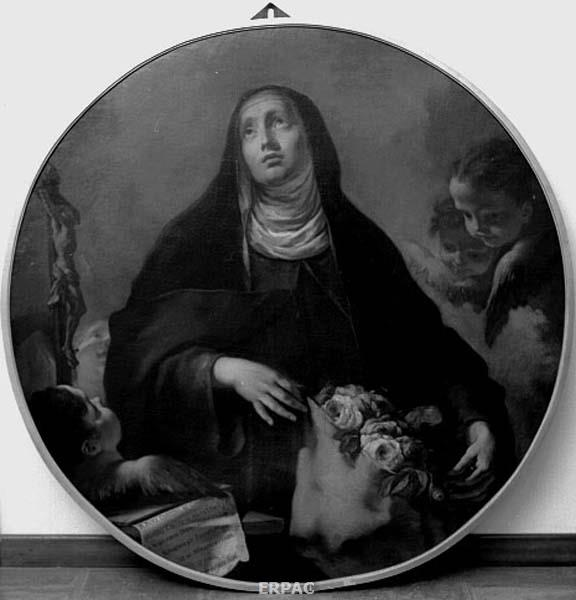
- Born: 3 March 1463; Verolanuova, Brescia, Duchy of Milan
- Died: 24 January 1515 (aged 51); Binasco, Milan, Duchy of Milan
- Venerated in: Roman Catholic Church
- Beatified: 14 August 1845, Saint Peter's Basilica, Papal States by Pope Gregory XVI
- Feast: 23 January (Brescia); 24 January
- Attributes: Franciscan habit

Paola Gambara Costa (3 March 1463 - 24 January 1515) was an Italian Roman Catholic professed member of the Third Order of Saint Francis. She was born to nobles and married in 1475 to the nobleman Lodovico Antonio Costa - and had one child - who soon acquired a mistress and chastised her for her generous nature towards the poor and ill. Her husband later repented and died leaving her widowed and she died not long after this.

Gambara desired to become a nun but complied with the desire of her parents to embrace marriage and so dedicated herself to serving her husband while at the same time learning to detest his excessive lavishness and the pomp of his noble court. Her friend and confessor was Angelo Carletti whom she and her husband later attributed the latter's cure to.

Her beatification received formal confirmation from Pope Gregory XVI on 14 August 1845 after the latter ratified that there existed a spontaneous and enduring local 'cultus' - or longstanding and popular veneration.

== Life ==
Paola Gambara Costa was born on 3 March 1463 in Brescia as the first of seven children to the nobles Giampaolo Gambara and Taddea Caterina Martinengo. Her following siblings included:

- Marietta - later a nun
- Ippolita - a mother of fourteen children
- Laura - a widow who dedicated herself to the care of the ill
- Federico
- Lodovico
- Maddalena

In her childhood she delighted in spiritual reading and reflection on the Gospel and harbored an ardent desire to become a nun later in life. But this dream was cut short when her parents decided to arrange her marriage to Count Lodovico Antonio Costa - the Lord of Benasco - and she saw this as the will of God manifesting itself and so complied with the wishes of her parents. Her confessor prior to her marriage was Father Andrea da Quinzano of the Sant'Apollonio convent in Brescia. The marriage came about after Count Bongiovanni Costa visited her parents and was struck with her virtue and so wanted her as his nephew Lodovico Antonio's wife. Her decision to be a nun concerned the count who sent her to Angelo Carletti - a Franciscan priest - who persuaded her that marriage was a call from God to embrace a different kind of life still in accordance with Christian values.

The pair married in autumn 1485 and the pair travelled to the small Benasco province for the ensuring celebrations. She endured her new husband's expensive tastes seeing it as her role to be faithful to him even if she did not live the excessive luxuries. In spring 1486 the couple visited Milan and Alessandria before setting off for Asti. The two also visited Turin where the duke received them. Her confessor around this time was Father Crescenzio Morra from Bene though she later reconnected with Carletti who became her friend and spiritual advisor as well as a confessor. Carletti kept her on the path of virtue and advised her to enroll in the Third Order of Saint Francis while learning to appreciate the poor and to detest the lavishness of the secular world. She joined in 1491 with the permission of her husband. Gambara often deprived herself of food in order to bring it to the sick and on one occasion took off her shoes and gave it to an old woman who walked barefoot over ice and snow on one occasion during winter.

Gambara also became the godmother of Yolande in 1487 who was the daughter of Duke Charles I and Bianca di Monferrato. In 1488 she gave birth to her sole child Giovanni Francesco and named him in honor of Francis of Assisi. To mark this occasion she managed to persuade her husband to distribute large amounts of food to the poor of their area.

Her actions soon vexed her husband who reproached her for her conduct and ridiculed her in front of their servants and the servants followed their master's example and joined in ridiculing their mistress. Costa soon acquired a mistress - the daughter of the Podestà of Carrù - and he allowed her to live in the castle in 1494 even though Gambara resided there. In 1495 her son left for Chieri for his education and Father Carletti died on 11 April 1495. She attended his funeral in Cuneo - he died at the convent of Sant'Antonio - but fell ill there. Following this she suffered strong migraines. In 1500 she reunited with her parents and siblings when she returned to her hometown on a brief visit. In 1504 the mistress fell ill with abdominal pains and it was Gambara who comforted her and forgave her as she died. Also in 1504 her son - now a page - returned to his home and a grand banquet was celebrated for him.

Her husband later repented and approved her good works and also consented to her wearing the habit of her order in public. Costa became ill in 1504 and she began to tend to him. The two travelled to Cuneo to ask for the intercession of her former confessor Carletti and when her husband was healed attributed the healing to him - Costa celebrated a banquet in commemoration of this and undertook a pilgrimage to the priest's grave in thanksgiving with his wife at his side. This was short-lived for her husband died not long after in 1504.

On 14 January 1515 she was struck with an extreme fever that caused her great pain and she died on 24 January 1515 in the town of Binasco in Milan after having confessed and received the Eucharist for the final time.

== Beatification ==
Her beatification received formal ratification on 14 August 1845 once Pope Gregory XVI issued a decree that recognized that there existed an enduring and longstanding local 'cultus' - otherwise known as popular veneration and devotion - that endured through the centuries after her death and was a spontaneous devotion rather than something that evolved over time.
