= Sanctuary of Valinotto =

Church building in Carignano, Italy

Coordinates: 44°53′08″N 7°37′38″E

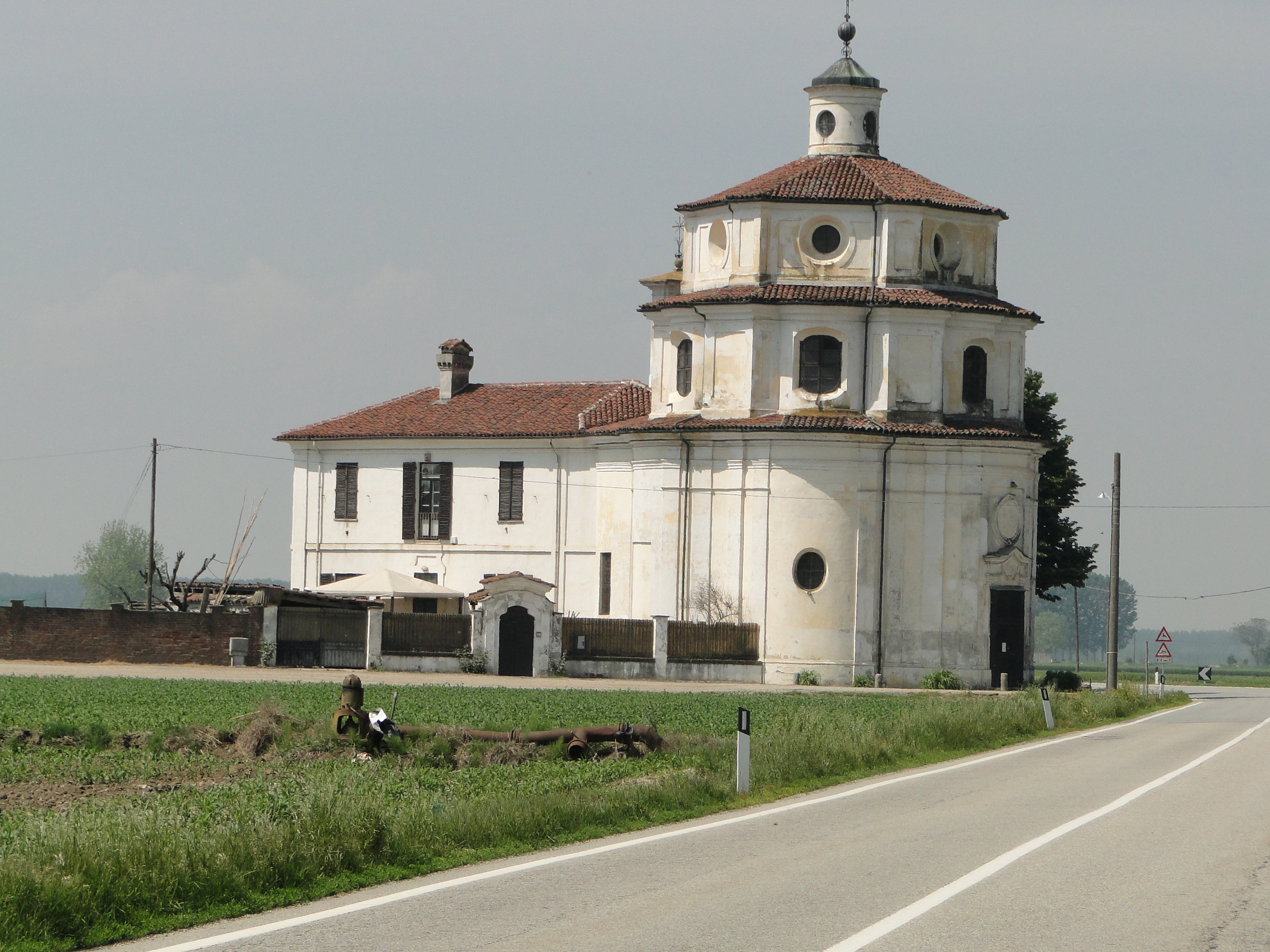
View of the church

The Sanctuary of the Visitation in Valinotto (Italian: Santuario della Visitazione del Valinotto) is a late-Baroque style Roman Catholic sanctuary church located along the route SP138 in the rural farmland of Valinotto (or Vallinotto) near the town of Carignano in the Metropolitan City of Turin in the region of Piedmont, Italy. The small church, with its stunning hexagonal ribbed dome, was designed in 1738 by the prominent Piedmontese architect Bernardo Vittone.

== History and description ==
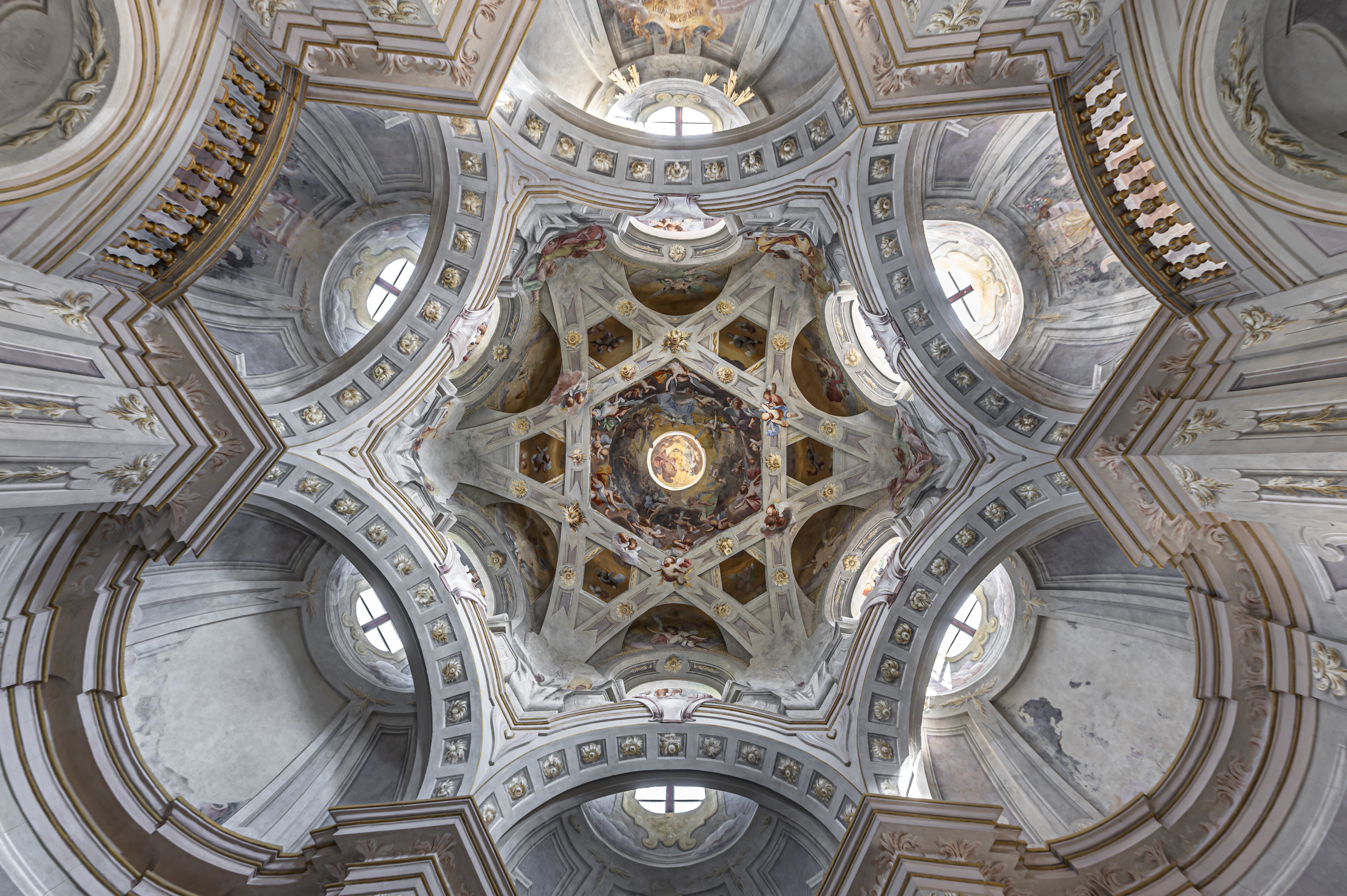
Cupola as seen from the nave.

A small hermitage at the site, dedicated to the Visitation of the Virgin Mary to her cousin Elisabeth, was replaced by the present church. The Vittone church was commissioned by the jurist Antonio Faccio, owner of the Cascina del Valinotto and founder of the Opera Pia Faccio-Frichieri in Carignano. The interior, including its highly elaborate dome, was frescoed in 1738-1740 by Pier Francesco Guala.

In 2016, the church was reopened after a restoration sponsored by the Compagnia di San Paolo and guided by Laura Salvetti Firpo, along with the architects Agostino Magnaghi, Fiorella Mitton, Antonino Mannina, and Dr. Carmen Rossi.

On June 4, 2017, it was reopened to the public after an initial restoration phase in which the Compagnia di San paolo Foundation participated.

== See also ==
- 18th-century Western domes
