= Santa Maria Maddalena, Alba =

Church building in Alba, Italy

Coordinates: 44°41′54″N 8°02′04″E

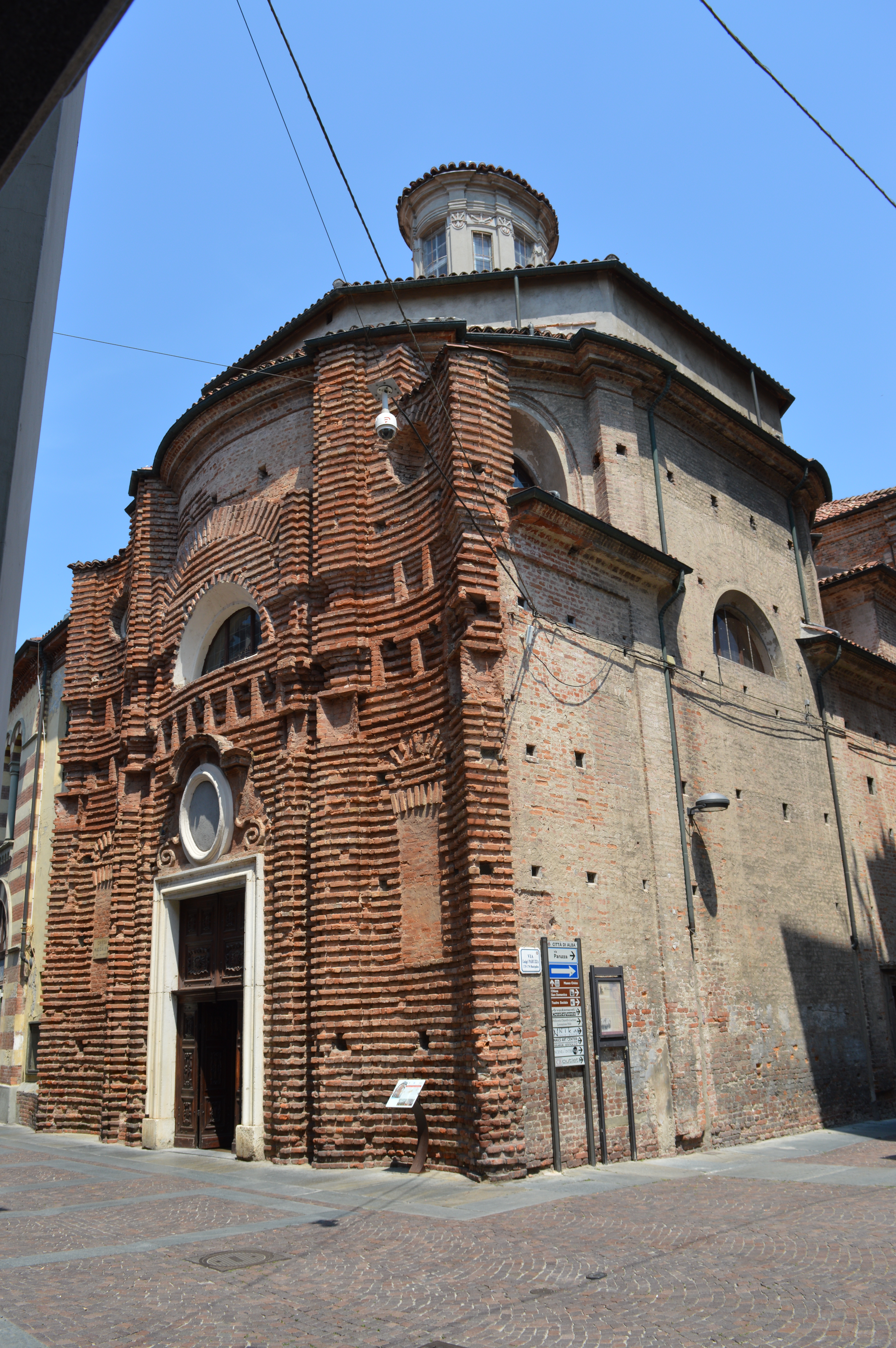
View of facade

Santa Maria Maddalena (Italian: Holy Mary Magdalen) is a late-Baroque style, Roman Catholic church located at Vittorio Emanuele #19 in the town of Alba in the province of Cuneo in the region of Piedmont, Italy. The church was designed by the prominent Piedmontese architect Bernardo Vittone, and completed in 1749.

== History and description ==
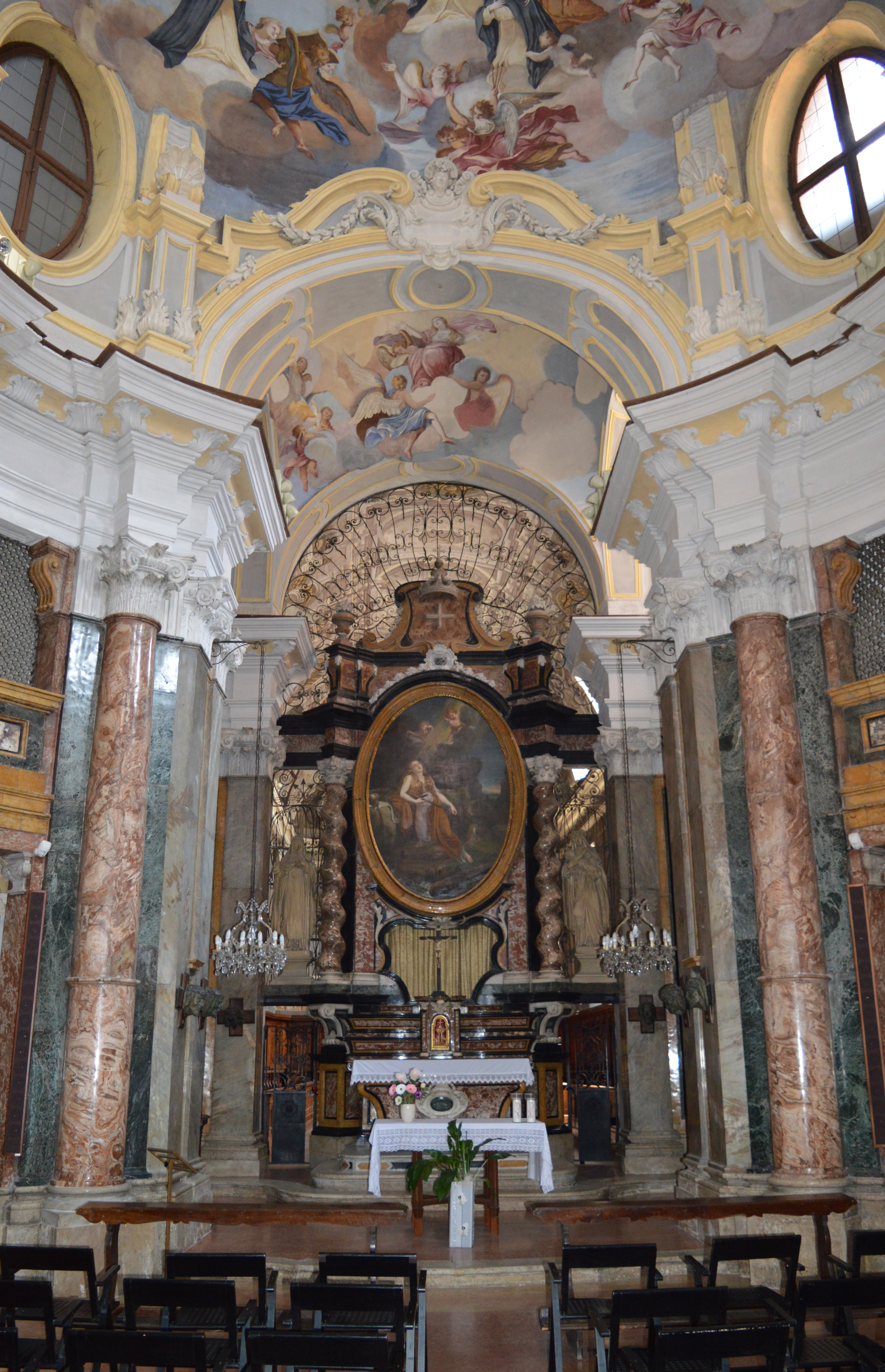
Main altar of church

The church was commissioned from the architect Vittone by the Conte Carlo Giacinto della Rovere. It was built at the site of a chapel built in 1442 by an order of Dominican nuns attached to the Blessed Margaret of Savoy.

The brick facade remains unfinished, but the pattern of concave and convex strips is characteristic of late-baroque architecture. On the portal are three carved arrows, a symbol of Margherita.

The plain exterior does not resemble the refined and colorful interior. The portal are immediately leads to a generally-rectangular nave area, surrounded by elegant corinthian columns, with an oval dome. The dome frescoes depict the Exaltation of the Blessed Margherita of Savoy, painted 1747-1750 by Michele Antonio Milocco. The polychrome marble altar on the left holds a silver and gilded coffin (1840) with the relics of the blessed nun. On the right is the altar dedicated to St Rose of Lima, also a Dominican nun. The main altar has an altarpiece depicting St Mary Magdalen (1825) by Giovanni Battista Biscarra. Atop two Solomonic columns are heraldic shields of the House of Savoy; these were sculpted in 1689 and 1691 for the altar present in the church located here prior to the present Vittone church. Behind the presbytery is an oak wood-paneled choir area, once reserved for the nuns. It is roofed with a barrel vault, frescoed with tromp l'oeil quadratura (1734) by Giacomo Rapa. Among the other decorations in the church is a 16th-century crucifix and a bust of Christ sculpted by Pietro Canonica.
