= Giovanni Battista Biscarra =

Italian painter (1790–1851)

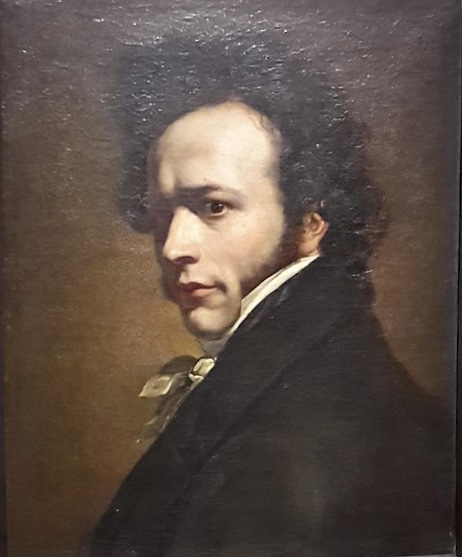
Self-portrait (date unknown)

Giovanni Battista Biscarra or Jean-Baptiste Biscarra (February 22, 1790 – April 13, 1851) was an Italian painter, sculptor and lithographer. He principally painted historical and religious subjects and royal portraits.

== Life ==
Born in Nizza (then in Savoy, part of the Kingdom of Sardinia, now Nice in France), Biscarra was the son of Caterina Coppon and Giuseppe Costantino Biscarra. His father was auditor and general treasurer of the Royal Army of the Kingdom of Sardinia and the House of Savoy. His cousin was the romantic poet Agathe-Sophie Sasserno.

Biscarra learned the rudiments of art from Pietro Benvenuti at the Accademia di Firenze in Florence, where his family had taken refuge during the French occupation of Savoy and the Piedmont. After many years of study at the Academy of Fine Arts of Florence, he graduated with the painting The Prodigal Son Weeps For His Errors (c. 1814, private collection).

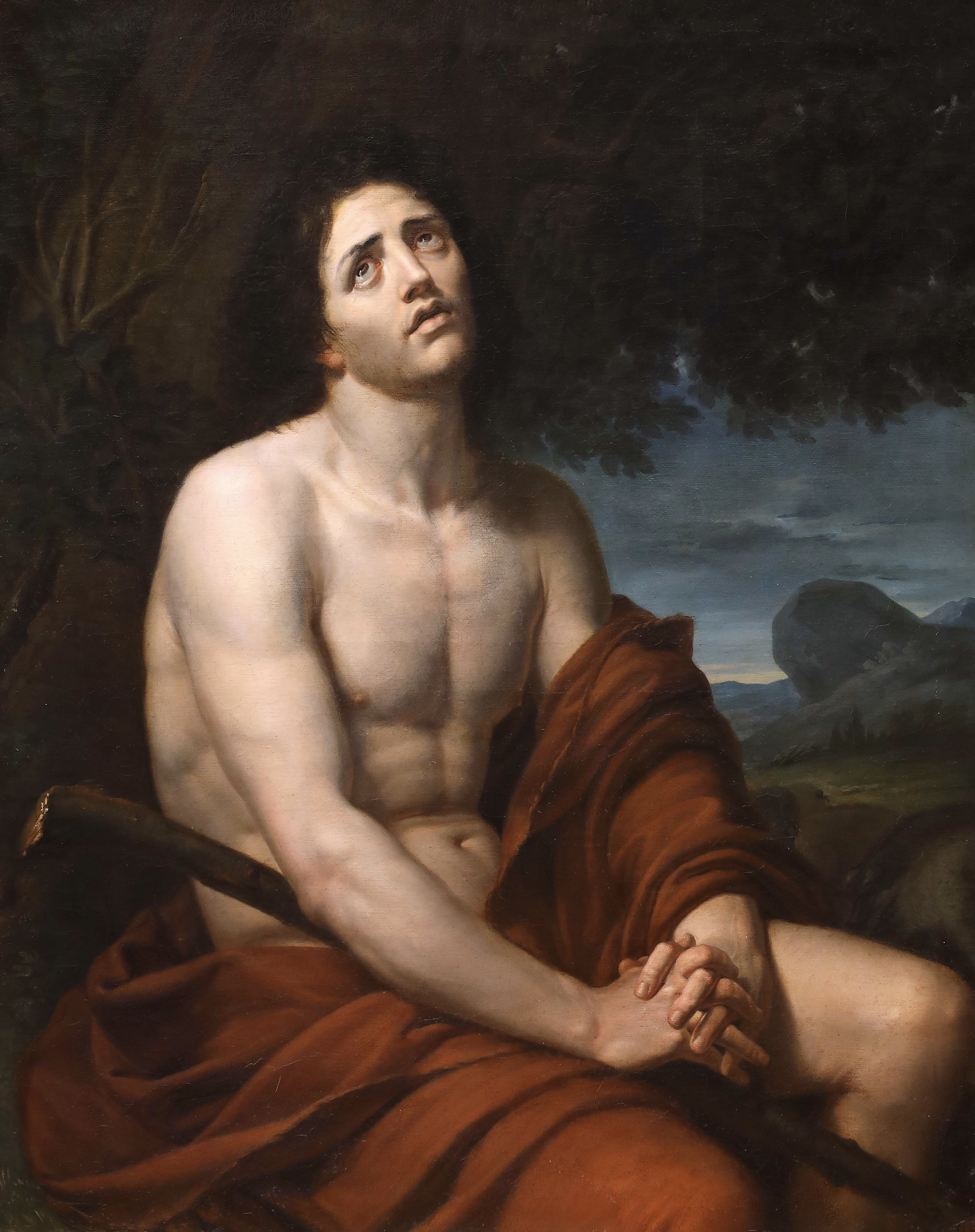
The Prodigal Son Weeps for His Errors

In 1815, Biscarra moved to Rome with a stipend from King Victor Emmanuel I of Sardinia. There, he studied at the Accademia di San Luca where he refined his skills as a student of Vincenzo Camuccini and became friends with the leading artists of Roman neoclassicism, including Antonio Canova, Bertel Thorvaldsen, Pietro Tenerani, and several others. He gained great notoriety in Rome with The Remorse of Cain (1819, antechamber of the Superintendence, in the Palazzo Carignano).

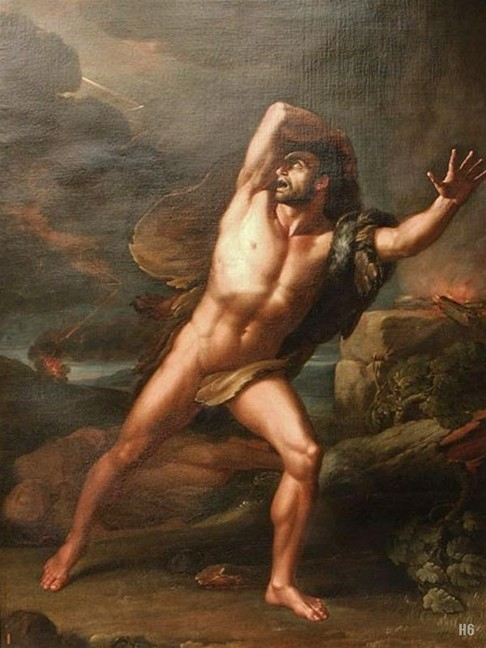
The Remorse of Cain

After six years in Rome, Biscarra was summoned to Turin by the new King Charles Felix of Sardinia. By sovereign decree of 17 September 1821 he was named the "first painter of His Majesty, Head and Master of the Schools of Painting and Drawing, and Director of the Academy of the Nude". In 1822, he began teaching there, proving himself to be an excellent instructor. He continued teaching after the establishment of the Royal Academy of Fine Arts in 1824 and after the Albertine reform of the academy in 1833. In 1842, he participated in the founding of the 'Società Promotrice delle Belle Arti' ('Society for the Promotion of Fine Arts'). He served the successive Kings of Sardinia until his death, including, ultimately, King Vittorio Emmanuele II, who later became the first king of unified Italy. Biscarra died in Turin on 13 April 1851.

His son Carlo Felice Biscarra (born in 1821) was a prominent painter in Turin, and also taught at the academy there. His grandson Cesare Biscarra (born in 1866) was both a talented sculptor and painter.

== Works ==
Biscarra is best known for his compositions depicting episodes from the history of the Kingdom of Sardinia and the House of Savoy. He is also known for his altarpieces for the churches of Turin, Alba, Nizza Monferrato, Fossano, Mondovì and several other towns in the Piedmont. Biscarra is further recognized as an excellent portrait painter, and many of his portraits are of the members of the royal households of Sardinia and Savoy. Biscarra is known to have painted two self-portraits. One is on display in the Galleria D'Arte Moderna in Milan (image above). The other is in the collection of the Galleria degli Uffizi in Florence.

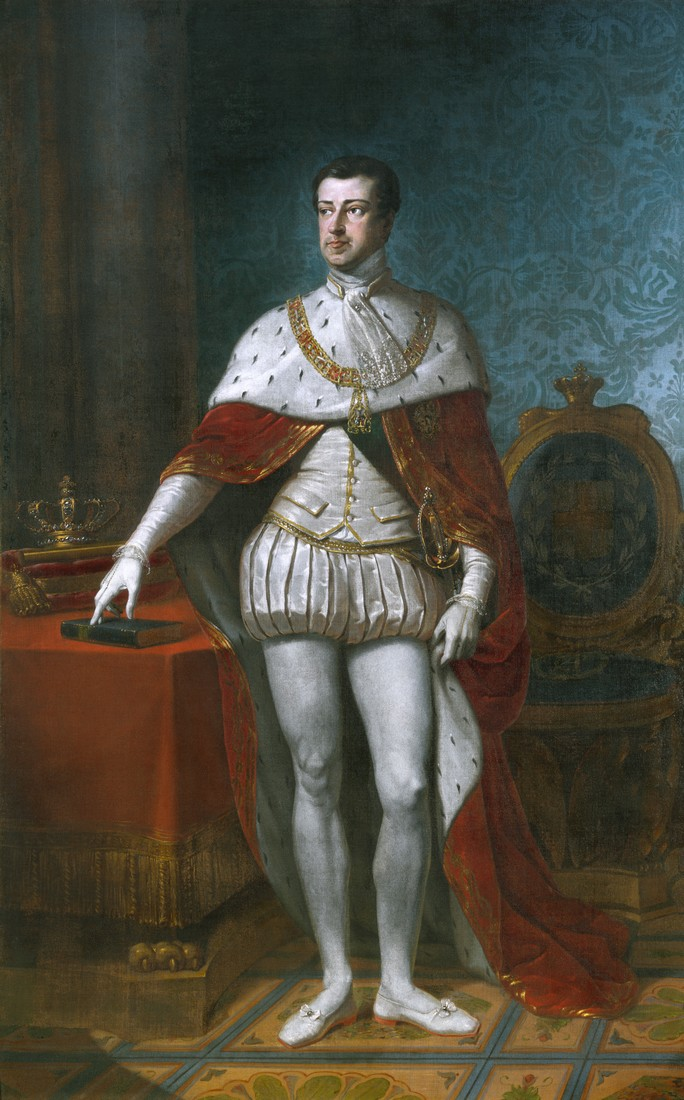
Portrait of Charles Albert of Sardinia

His earliest works hearkened back to the Baroque period, but then he quickly progressed after moving to Rome toward a neoclassical style akin to that of Jacques-Louis David. Later in life, he developed a more purist taste, especially in his religious compositions. In his most mature phase he showed a romantic tendency, as exemplified in his narrations of events from national history. In his latest works, especially in his late portraits and The Nude Class of the Academy of Fine Arts (1840, Albertina, Turin, Civic Museum, the Modern Art Gallery), he showed a movement towards realism.

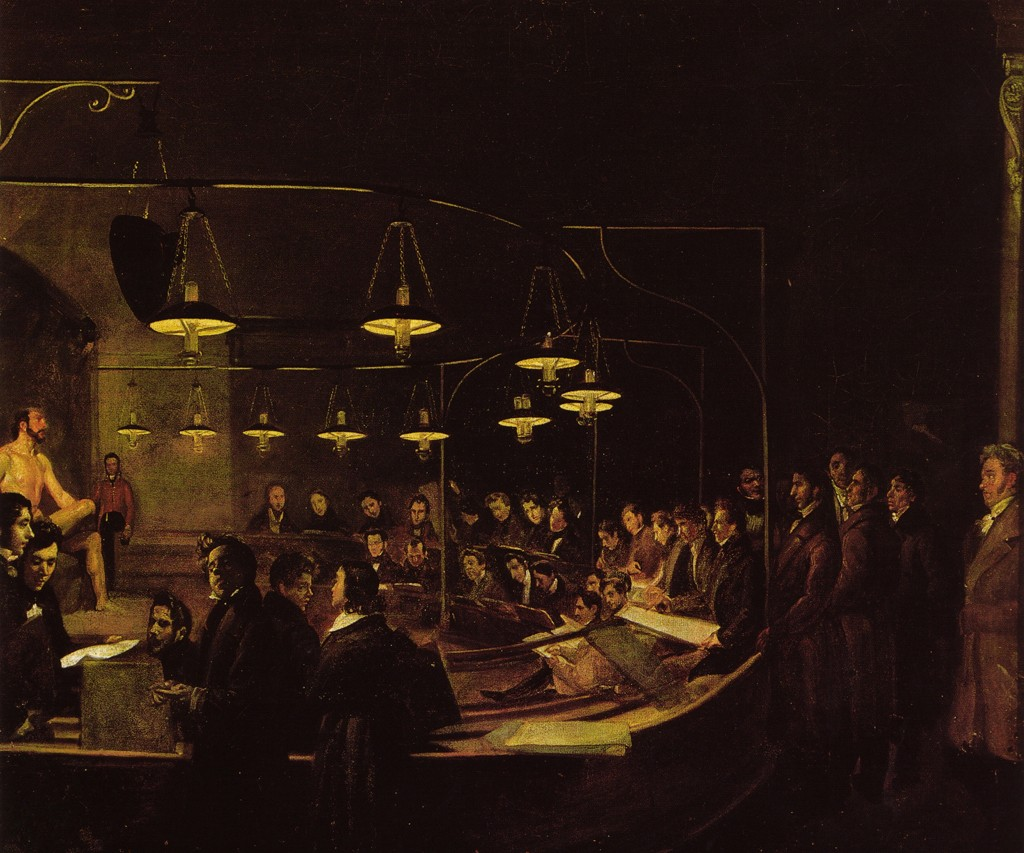
The Nude Class of the Academy of Fine Arts

He excelled in large-scale compositions. The Royal Palace of Turin and various churches of that city have works of Biscarra including The promulgation of the Albertine Civil Code. He also painted the stage curtain of the former Municipal Theatre (Opera), which was destroyed by fire in 1881.
