= Agathe-Sophie Sasserno =

French poet (1810–1860)

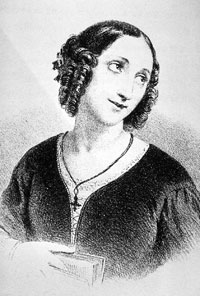
- Portrait of the poet held in the Musée Masséna, Nice
- Born: 3 October 1810; Nice, France
- Died: 6 June 1860 (aged 49); Nice, France
- Occupation: Poet

Agathe-Sophie Sasserno (3 October 1810 – 6 June 1860) was a French poet. She was born in Nice and spent her life there. Although she wrote in French, she considered herself Italian.

== Life ==
Agathe-Sophie Sasserno was born in 1810 at the Place Victor (today the Place Garibaldi) in Nice. She was the daughter of Lieutenant Colonel Louis Sasserno, a former aide of André Masséna, and Marie Sibille Chartroux. She was a cousin of the painter Giovanni Battista Biscarra. She wrote her first poem at the age of fourteen to distract her father. According to Jean-Baptiste Toselli, she received much praise for this, which encouraged her to continue. She remained single all her life and devoted herself entirely to poetry.

Although she wrote in French she considered herself Italian so she dedicated her work Les Sylphides (1838) to King Charles Albert of Sardinia. She later wrote Ore meste, chants sur l'Italie (1846), and the collection Poésies françaises d'une Italienne in 1854 for which the critic Charles Augustin Sainte-Beuve wrote the preface. She was enthusiastic about the ongoing unification of Italy. In 'Glorie e Sventure : chants de guerre de l'indépendance italienne (1852) she evoked Anita Garibaldi.

Her attachment to Nice, which she calls her homeland, is also a recurring theme in her poems. She writes of it in Nice (1858) "Oh Nice, oh my country Nice, oh sweet natal soil, oh my Nice so beautiful". In Tears and Smiles (1856) six poems are devoted to Nice. One entitled Physionomies nationales describes several regional costumes, of which two are of the Land of Nice. In À Catherine Ségurane she celebrates the heroism of Catherine Ségurane, the washerwoman of Nice.

During her life, she corresponded with several French writers including Alphonse de Lamartine, Alexandre Dumas, Victor Hugo and François-René de Chateaubriand. She was a corresponding member of the Academy of Sciences, Arts and Belles Lettres of Lyon. She is buried in the cemetery of the castle. A square and a private school are named after her in Nice.

== Works ==
- Agathe Sophie Sassernò (1838), Les Sylphides : chants d'une jeune fille dédiés à Sa Majesté le Roi Charles-Albert, Nice: Suchet fils, p. 231
- Agathe Sophie Sassernò (1844), Haute-Combe, poème lyrique
- Agathe Sophie Sassernò (1845), Une Larme sur l'autel ! Romance, music by Adolphe de Groot, Paris: Challiot
- Agathe Sophie Sassernò (1845), Le Mousse au départ ! Romance, music by Adolphe de Groot, Paris: Chelliot
- Agathe Sophie Sassernò (1846), Ore meste, chants sur l'Italie et poésies intimes et religieuses, Turin: Etablissement typ. Fontana, p. 334
- Agathe Sophie Sassernò (1847), L'Ange et Minla, poème lyrique en 3 parties : l'amour, l'extase, la mort, Paris: impr. de Firmin-Didot frères, p. 16
- Agathe Sophie Sassernò (1851), Le Départ des pêcheurs ! (Barcarolle à 2 voix), music by Alfred Sasserno, Paris: E. Challiot
- Agathe Sophie Sassernò (1852), Glorie e Sventure : chants de guerre de l'indépendance italienne, et poésies nouvelles, vol. 1–2, Turin
- Agathe Sophie Sassernò (1854), Poésies françaises d'une Italienne, Paris: Charpentier, p. 283
- Agathe Sophie Sassernò (1854), Pauvre petit ! Romance, music by Ch. Poppa Montano, Paris: imp. de Bouchard
- Agathe Sophie Sassernò (1855), Nizza, duettino, music by Luigi Bordèse, Paris: Chabal, p. 9
- Agathe Sophie Sassernò (1856), Pleurs et sourires : Étrennes poétiques, Turin: Impr. de l'Union typographique-éditrice, p. 208
- Agathe Sophie Sassernò (1859), La Prière de la jeune fille, scène, paroles de S. Sasserno, cover illustrated by Aumont Leroux, composer Luigi Bordèse, Paris: J. Heinz, p. 7
- Agathe Sophie Sassernò (1863), Marie. Romance p.r baryton, music by Anthime Donnay, cover illustration by Antoine Barbizet, Paris: chez Alphonse Leduc
- Jacques Azaïs; M. E. Carou; Agathe Sophie Sassernò (1882), Poésies bitteroises de Jacques Azaïs,... Élégie sur l'anniversaire de J. Azaïs, Paris: Maisonneuve / Société pour l'étude des langues romanes, p. 289, archived from the original on 2017-11-08
- Agathe Sophie Sassernò (1888), La lyre du jeune âge : La prière de la jeune fille, composer Luigi Bordèse, Paris: O. Bornemann, p. 61

== Sources ==
- Agathe Sasserno (in French), CTHS: Comité des travaux historiques et scientifiques, archived from the original on 2008-11-21
- Carlier, Patricia, "Agathe-Sophie Sasserno et Nice" (PDF), Lou Sourgentin (in French) (175), archived from the original (PDF) on 2011-03-06
- Derot, Maurice (January–March 1980), "Agathe-Sophie Sasserno, la Sapho niçoise", Nice Historique, year 83 (1): 3, archived from the original on 2016-03-03
- Fighiera, Charles-Alexandre; Hildesheimer, Ernest (January–March 1980), "À propos d'Agathe-Sophie Sasserno", Nice Historique (in French), 83 (1), archived from the original on 2016-07-16
- Schor, Ralph (2002), "Sasserno, Agathe-Sophie", Dictionnaire historique et biographique du comté de Nice, Encyclopædia Niciensis (in French), vol. IV, Nice, Serre, ISBN 978-2-86410-366-0
- Toselli, Jean-Baptiste (1860), Biographie niçoise ancienne et moderne (in French), vol. II, Nice: Imprimerie de la Société typographique
- Un lieu du souvenir, les cimetières du Château de Nice (in French), Mairie de Nice
