= Santa Maria Maddalena, Foglizzo =

Church building in Foglizzo, Italy

Coordinates: 45°16′29″N 7°49′25″E

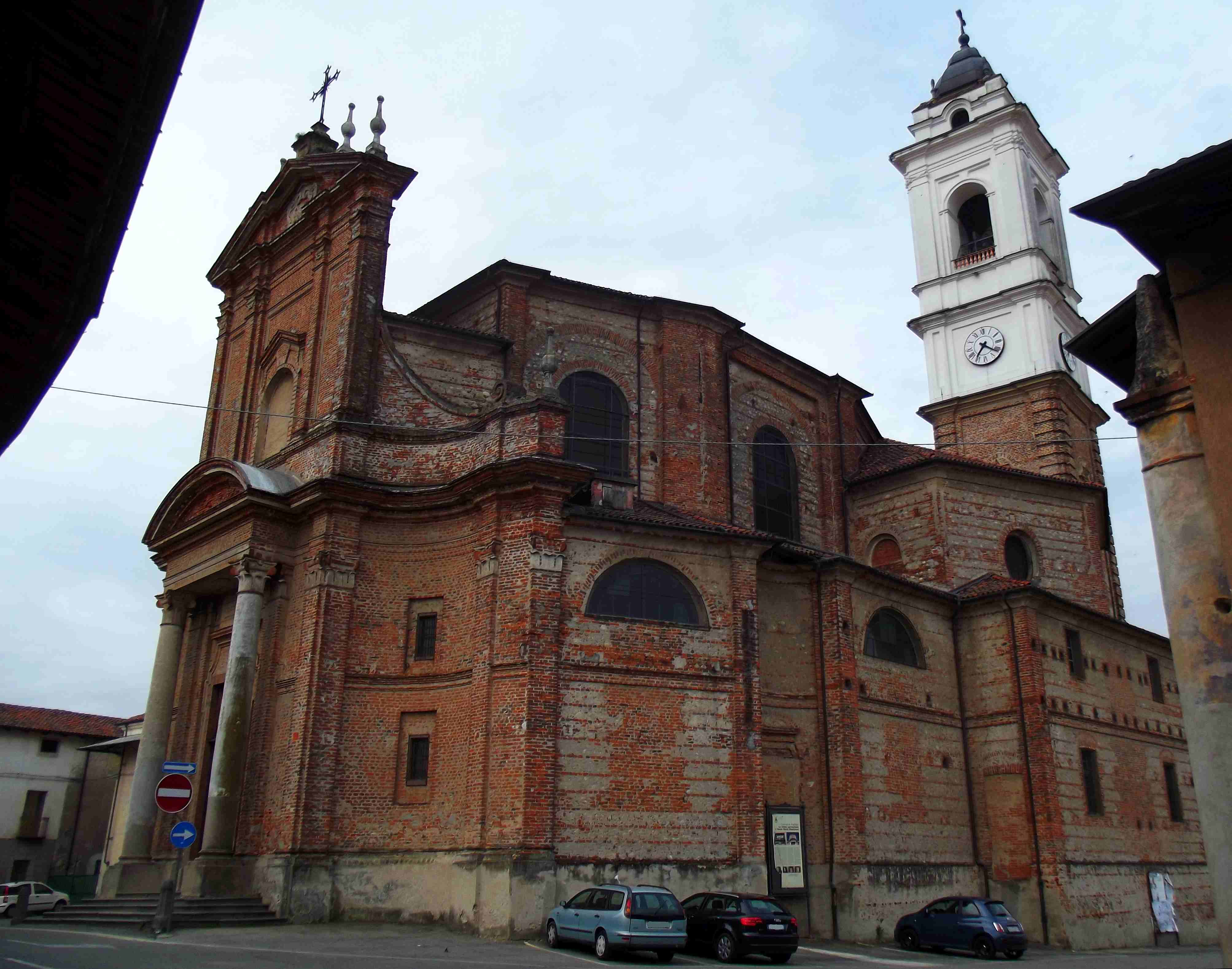
Facade and bell tower

.

Santa Maria Maddalen (Holy Mary Magdalen) is a late-Baroque style, Roman Catholic parish church located in the town of Foglizzo, in the Metropolitan City of Turin in the region of Piedmont, Italy.

== History and description ==
This church was built at the site of a former chapel (built 1600s) dedicated to St Elizabeth. The present parish church was erected from 1741 to 1746 using designs by Bernardo Vittone. The interior has a single nave occupying an elongated octagonal layout, lit through tall windows. The apse has a frescoed dome and lantern. The presbytery chapels are larger and have elegant tracery in the vaults. The tall bell-tower rises over 55 meters and was begun in 1723. The organ by Bossi dates to 1866.

The interior is richly decorated in polychrome and painted marbles. Google map images from 2024 show facade undergoing repair.
