= Angelo Carletti di Chivasso =

Italian moral theologian

Blessed Angelo Carletti di Chivasso O.F.M.
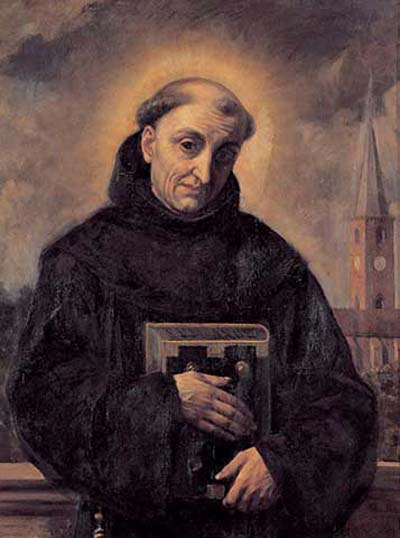

Religious
- Born: 1411; Chivasso, Piedmont
- Died: 1495; Coni, Piedmont
- Venerated in: Roman Catholic Church
- Beatified: April 14, 1753, Saint Peter's Basilica, Papal States by Pope Benedict XIV
- Major shrine: Chivasso and Coni (mod. Cuneo)
- Feast: April 12
- Attributes: Franciscan habit
- Patronage: Coni

Angelo Carletti di Chivasso was a noted moral theologian of the Order of Friars Minor; born at Chivasso in Piedmont, in 1411; and died at Coni, in Piedmont, in 1495.

His name in Latin is usually given as Angelus de Clavasio (Clavasium being the Latin name of his birthplace). This form is preserved in bibliographic usage.

== Life ==
Antonio Carletti was born in 1411 to a noble family of Chivasso, Italy, near Turin. He attended the University of Bologna, where he received the degree of Doctor of Civil and Canon Law, and served as a magistrate in the Court of Chiavasso. He was appointed to the Senate by the Marquis of Monferrato Gian Giacomo. It was probably at the age of thirty that he entered the Order of Friars Minor at Santa Maria del Monte in Genoa, taking the name Angelo. There he met Francesco della Rovere, who was later to become Pope Sixtus IV.

In 1467 he accompanied Fra Pietro da Napoli, who had been charged by the Vicar General to reorder the Franciscan province of Austria.

In 1472 he was chosen to fill the office of Vicar-General of that branch of the Order then known as the Cismontane Observance, founded by Bernadine of Siena. He held that office again in 1478, in 1485 and in 1490. He founded the monasteries of Saluzzo, Mondovì and Pinerolo; and preached in Mantua, Genoa, Cuneo, Susa, Monferrato and Turin at the court of Charles I, Duke of Savoy. He also served as a spiritual counselor for Catherine of Genoa and Paola Gambara.

=== Apostolic Nuncio ===
In 1480 the Ottoman Empire under Mehmed II took possession of Otranto, and threatened to overrun and lay waste the area. Angelo was appointed Apostolic Nuncio by Pope Sixtus IV, and commissioned to preach a crusade against the invaders. While the residents of Otranto held out under siege, Mehmed II died and the Turkish forces retired from the Italian peninsula.

Again, in 1491, he was appointed Apostolic Nuncio and Commissary by Innocent VIII, conjointly with the Bishop of Mauriana, and reached a peaceful agreement between Catholics and Waldensians.

Angelo Carletti di Chivasso died on April 11, 1495, at the convent of St. Anthony at Cuneo.

== Writings ==
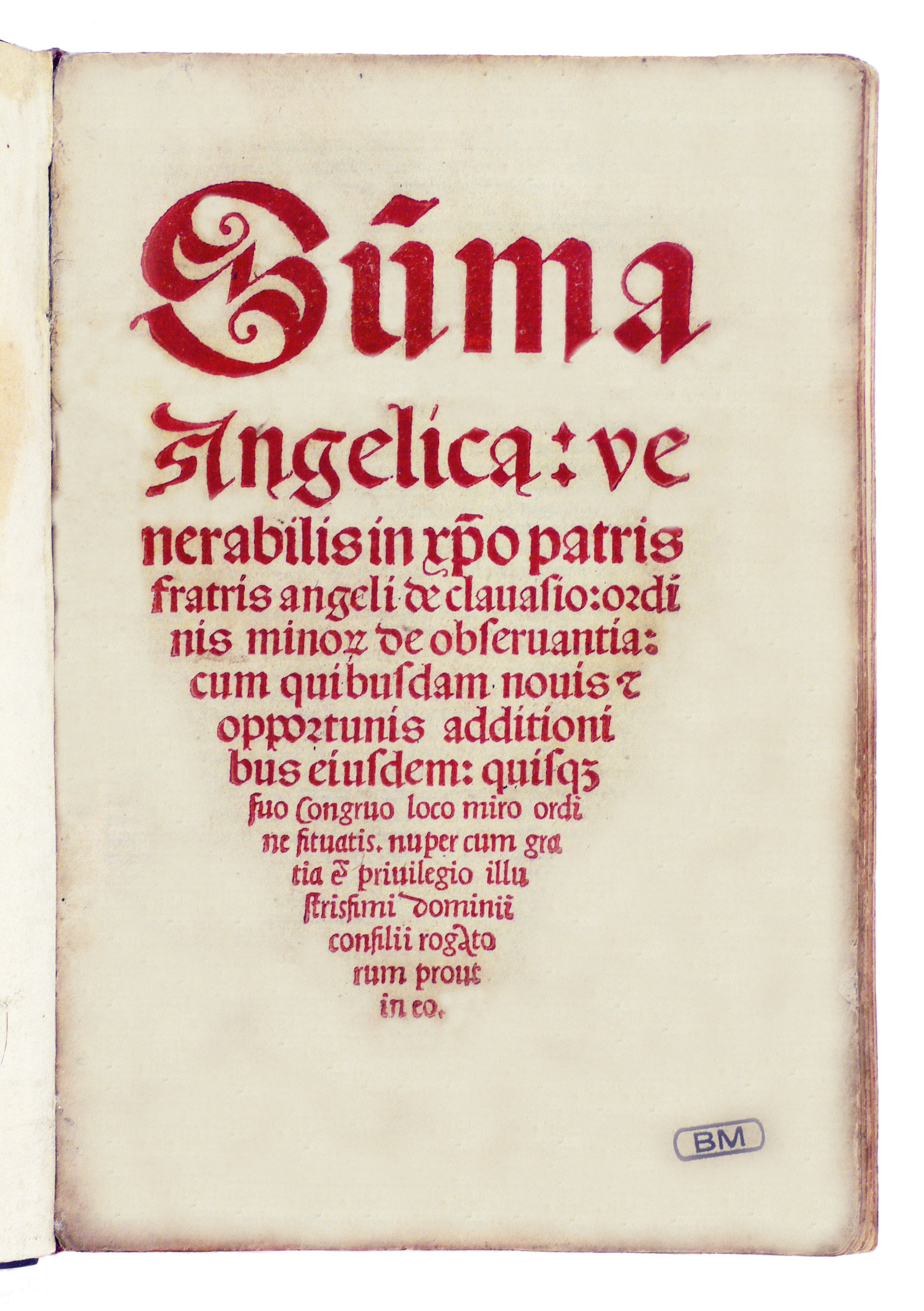
Summa Angelica, 1511 (Fondazione Mansutti, Milano).

In theology he is considered a major adherent of Scotism. His works are given by Wadding in the latter's "Scriptores Ordinis Minorum". The most noted of these is the "Summa de Casibus Conscientiae", called after him the "Summa Angelica". The basis of this work was a "Summa Confessorum" by John Rumsik, O. P., Lector of Freiburg (d. 1314), which was then arranged alphabetically by Bartholomew of San Concordio who also added material on canon law. The first edition of di Chivasso's "Summa Angelica" appeared in the year 1486, and from that year to the year 1520 it went through 31 editions, 25 of which are preserved in the Royal Library at Munich.

The "Summa" is divided into 659 articles arranged in alphabetical order and forming what would now be called a dictionary of moral theology. The most important of these articles is the one entitled "Interrogationes in Confessione". It serves, in a way, as a dictionary of moral theology and was found very useful for confessors. Judging the character of the work of Bl. Angelo as a theologian from this, his most important contribution to moral theology, one is impressed with the gravity and fairness that characterized his opinions throughout. The "Summa" is a valuable guide in matters of conscience and approaches closely, in the treatment of the various articles, to casuistic theology as this science is now understood, hence the title of the work, "Summa de Casibus Conscientiae".

Martin Luther considered it a symbol of Catholic orthodoxy and had it publicly burned in the public square outside Wittenberg's Elster Gate on December 10, 1520, together with the Bull of Excommunication Exsurge Domine, the Corpus of Canon Law, and Johann Eck's "Chrysopassus".

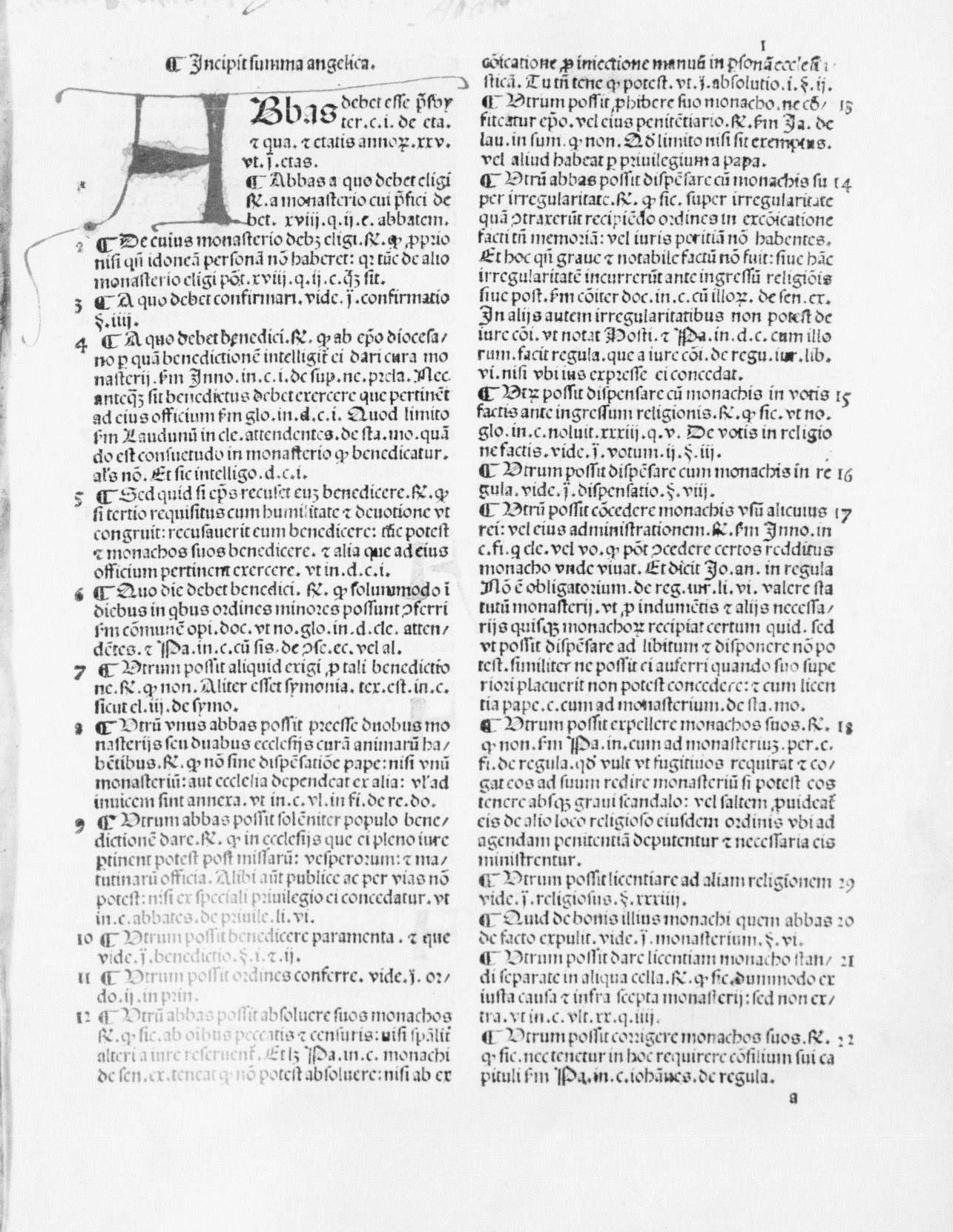
Summa angelica de casibus conscientiae, 1487

=== Editions ===
- Summa angelica de casibus conscientiae. Chivasso: Jacobinus Suigus, de Suico. 1486.
- Summa angelica de casibus conscientiae (in Latin). Venezia: Giorgio Arrivabene. 1487.

== Veneration ==
On April 14, 1753, Pope Benedict XIII beatified Angelo Carletti, giving official approval to the cult that had for long been paid to Angelo, especially by the people of Chivasso and Coni. The latter chose him as their special patron. His feast is kept on 12 April. He is celebrated in his native Chivasso, with an old country fair each year at the end of August.
