= Carignano, Piedmont =

Comune in the Metropolitan City of Turin

Carignano Carignan (Piedmontese)
- Comune
- Città di Carignano
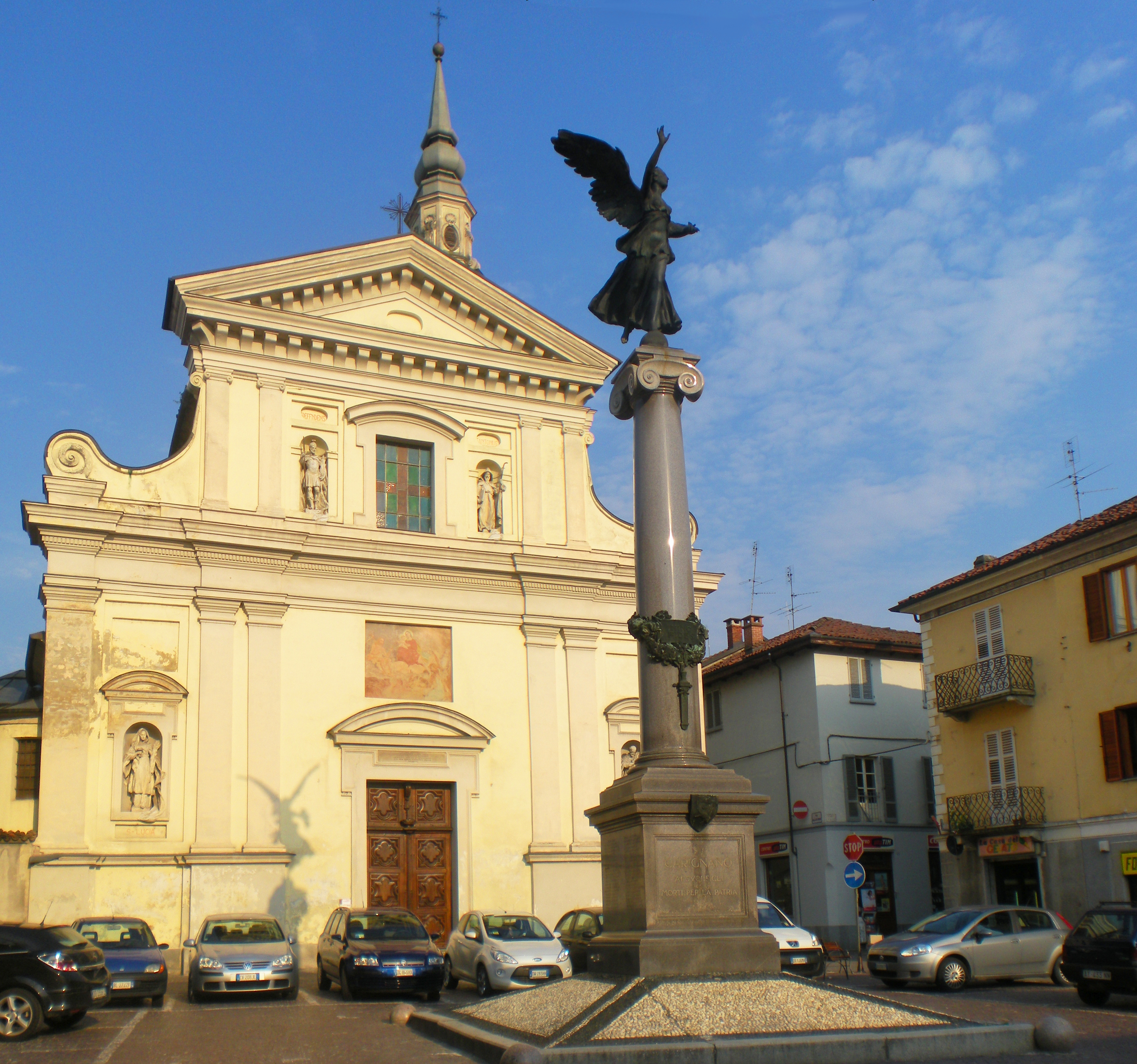
- Church of Misericordia

- Coat of arms

- Location within Italy Location within Piedmont
- Coordinates: 44°54′N 7°41′E
- Country: Italy
- Region: Piedmont
- Metropolitan city: Turin (TO)
- Frazioni: Balbo, Brassi, Brillante, Campagnino, Cascina Giumiengo, Cascina Monfalcone, Cascina Ravero, Cascina Rivarolo, Gorra, Gorrea, Pautasso, Peretti, Regione Degli Olmi, Regione Ponte Po, San Vito, Tetti Bagnolo, Tetti Faule, Tetti Pistonatti, Tetti Ruffino

Government
  - Mayor: Giorgio Albertino

Area
  - Total: 50.68 km^{2} (19.57 sq mi)
- Elevation: 235 m (771 ft)

Population (1-1-2021)
  - Total: 9,145
  - Density: 180.4/km^{2} (467.4/sq mi)
- Demonym: Carignanese(i)
- Time zone: UTC+1 (CET)
  - Summer (DST): UTC+2 (CEST)
- Postal code: 10041
- Dialing code: 011
- Patron saint: St. Remigius
- Saint day: Last Sunday of September
- Website: Official website

Carignano (Italian: [kariɲˈɲaːno]; Piedmontese: Carignan [kariˈɲɑŋ]) is a comune (municipality) in the Metropolitan City of Turin in the Italian region Piedmont, located about 20 kilometres (12 mi) south of Turin. Carignano borders the following municipalities: Moncalieri, Vinovo, La Loggia, Piobesi Torinese, Villastellone, Castagnole Piemonte, Osasio, Lombriasco and Carmagnola.

== Points of interest ==
- Sanctuary of Valinotto, a masterwork by the architect Bernardo Vittone, lies within the territory of the town.
- Villa Malenchini Fortuny, Carignano, a 16th-century rural palace.

== See also ==
- Carignane
