= Bernardo Antonio Vittone =

Italian architect and writer (1704–1770)

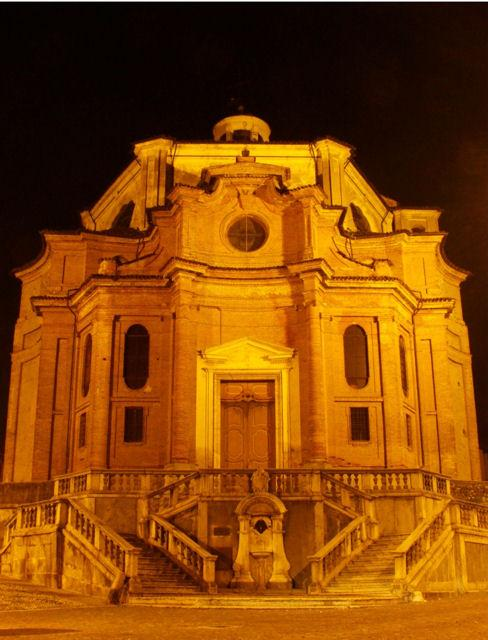
- Parish Church of Grignasco
- Born: 19 August 1704; Turin, Duchy of Savoy
- Died: 19 October 1770 (aged 66); Turin, Kingdom of Sardinia
- Occupation: Architect
- Known for: Sanctuary of Valinotto; Santa Chiara, Bra; Santi Vincenzo e Anastasio church, Cambiano
- Movement: Baroque

Bernardo Antonio Vittone (19 August 1704 – 19 October 1770) was an Italian architect and writer. He was one of the three most important Baroque architects active in the Piedmont region of Northern Italy; the other two were Filippo Juvarra and Guarino Guarini. The youngest of the three, Vittone was the only one who was born in Piedmont. He achieved a synthesis of the spatial inventiveness of Juvarra and the engineering ingenuity of Guarini, particularly in the design of his churches, the buildings for which he is best known.

== Life and works ==
Vittone was born in Turin into a mercantile family. He may have been introduced to architecture by his uncle, the architect Gian Giacomo Plantery and might have worked under Juvarra before departing for Rome. In Rome, Vittone won a first prize in the Accademia di San Luca in 1732. His architectural studies in Rome included works by Carlo Fontana and he was elected to the Academy in 1733 just prior to his return to Turin.

From 1735, he was engaged in preparing Guarini's Architettura Civile for publication in 1737. Following the death of Juvarra in 1736, several architectural commissions came his way. However, when the royal House of Savoy resumed its patronage of architecture in the early 1740s, they appointed Benedetto Innocente Alfieri as their architect, not Vittone. Instead, Vittone built up a clientele of patrons for who he designed buildings in the area around Turin.

Vittone's most inventive and memorable works are the parish churches, remote from the main cities. They include the Sanctuary della Visitazione at Vallinotto (1738–1739), near Carignano, erected for agricultural workers of the town. The exterior has a tiered dome, but the hexagonal interior has geometric elaborations with alternating convex and concave chapels that recall the architecture of Juvarra and Borromini. In the dome, the elaborately decorated ribs, reminiscent of Guarini's work, intersect to form a complex design illuminated by natural light playfully concealed by hidden windows. Another masterpiece is the church of Santa Chiara at Bra (1741-2); with a central double-shell dome with ornamented openings in the lower shell which offer views through to the painted second shell.

He also designed the Ospizio or Albergo di Carita (1744-9) at Carignano (for the indigent homeless) with its central chapel; the parish churches of Grignasco and Borgo d'Ale; the choir of S. Maria di Piazza and church of Santa Chiara in Turin; the church of Santa Maria Maddalena in Alba, the parish church of Santissimo Salvatore at Borgomasino, and the church of the Confraternity of Santa Croce (1755) at Villanova Mondovì. In 1766, he completed the church of San Bernardino at Riva di Chieri, with the help of his apprentices Andrea Rana and Pietro Bonvicini. Some of his late churches show an architectural restraint not apparent in his earlier works.

Vittone wrote two architectural treatises. The first was the lengthy Istruzioni elementari published in 1760 that was largely concerned with the column orders, and the second was the Istruzioni diverse of 1766 that included his own works. Both were dominated by traditional Renaissance musical theory of proportion, which is perhaps rather surprising given that Vittone had edited Guarini's treatise and absorbed the lessons on projective geometry so well in his own architectural designs. The co-existence of the innovative and the traditional in Vittone's writings has been commented on by the art historian Wittkower. He pointed out that Vittone attempted to mathematically prove the correct classic proportions of buildings, and that he used the recent discoveries of light by Newton to address questions of architecture, and he ends with a dedication to God and the Virgin Mary. He describes Vittone as:

an architect of rare ability, full of original ideas and of a creative capacity equalled only by few of the masters...What little we know of him suggests that his was an obsessed genius. This is also the impression one carries away from reading his two treatises, the Istruzioni elementari of 1760 and the Istruzioni diverse of 1766. The earlier treatise is one of the longest ever written, and the latter consists to a large extent of appendices to the first....the extraordinary thing about his treatises is that basically he has not moved far from Alberti's position ... (while) Alberti wanted to elevate and inform the mind, Vittone wants to delight. He also incorporates recent research -but for what purpose? ...Proportion is the one and all of these treatises, and Vittone's terms of reference are precisely those of Renaissance theory.

When Vittone died in 1770, and although his former pupils, Rana and Bonavici, continued Vittone's Late Baroque style of architecture, European architecture was moving steadily towards Neo-classicism.

== List of religious works ==
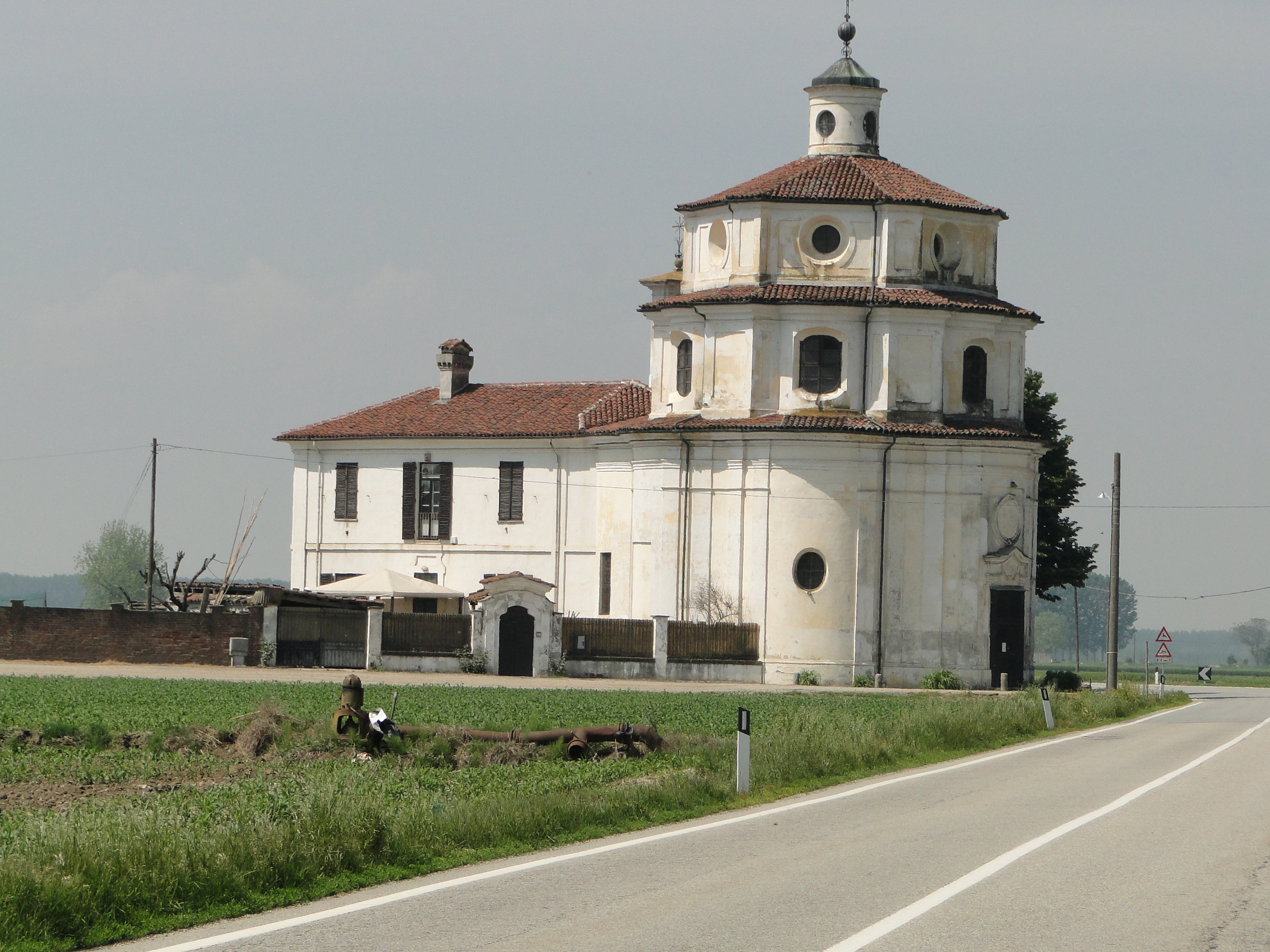
Santuario della Visitazione, Valinotto

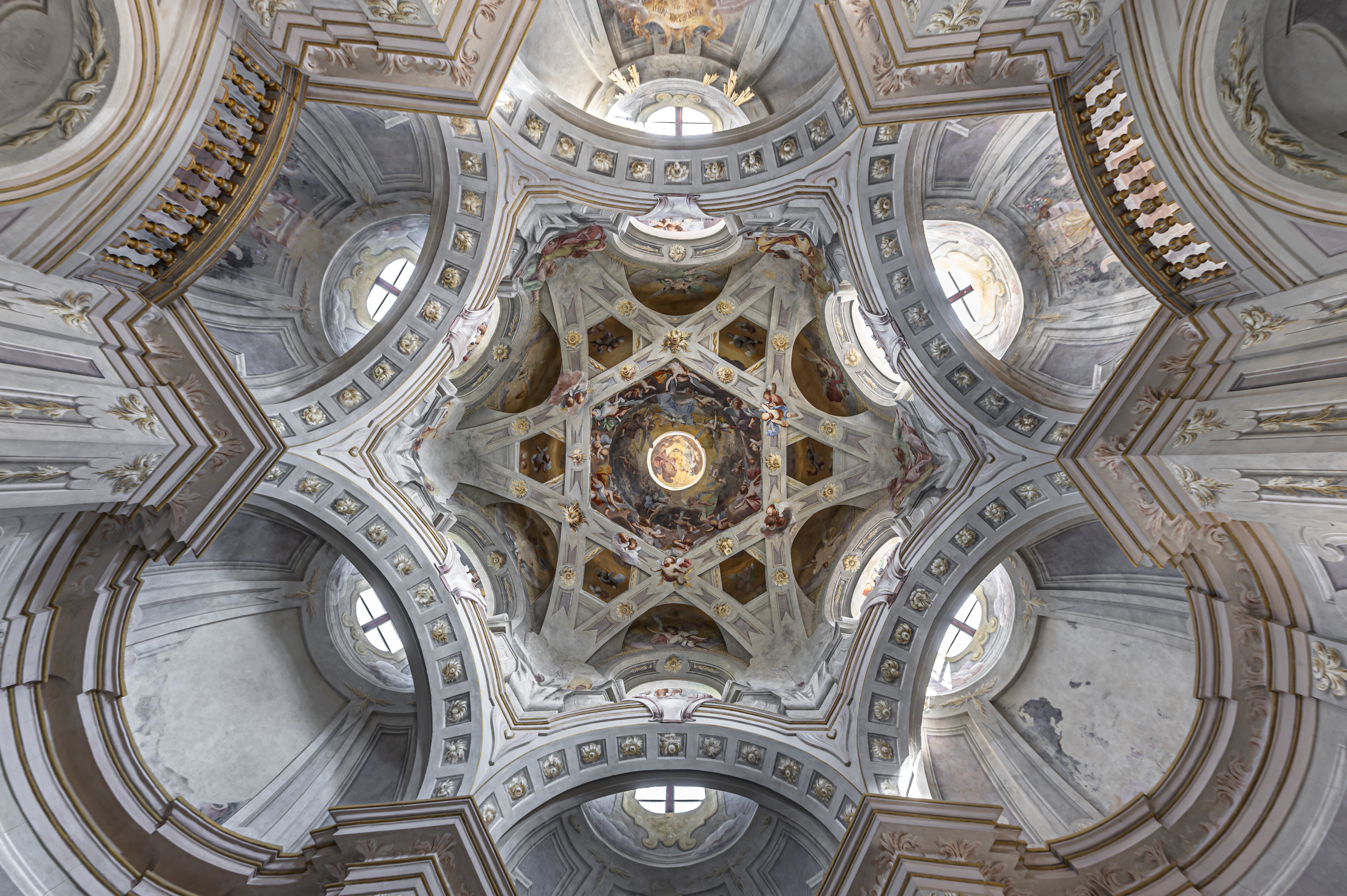
Dome of the Santuario della Visitazione

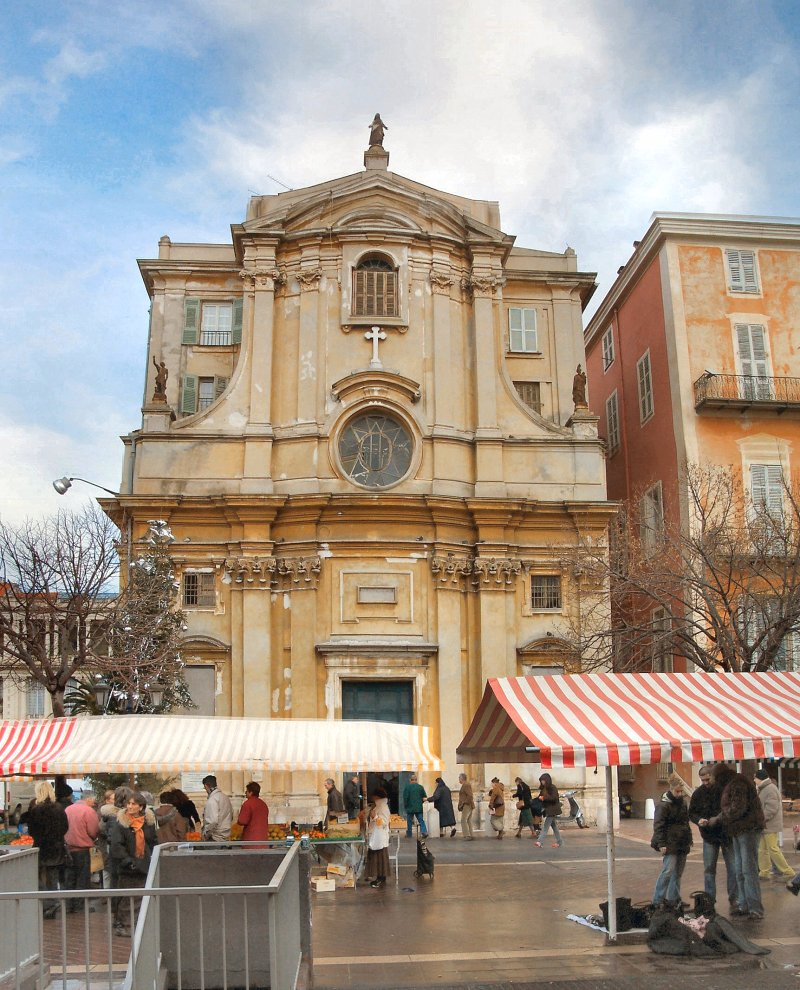
Saint-Gaétan, Nice

- San Giovanni Vincenzo church, Sant'Ambrogio di Torino (1755)
- Santa Maria Maddalena church, Alba (1730)
- Santa Maria della Neve, Pecetto Torinese, parish church (1730)
- San Secondo, Govone altar of parish church (1735)
- Capella di Arciconfraternita Santa Croce, Caramagna Piemonte; Main altar of chapel, (1736)
- Sanctuary della Visitazione, Valinotto, Carignano (1738–1739)
- Chiesa dell'Immacolata Concezione, Turin sacristy of the church (1738–1739)
- Santa Maria degli Angeli, Chivasso; choir and sacristy (1740–1745)
- Santi Vincenzo e Anastasio church, Cambiano; facade of church (1740–1741)
- Santi Bernardino e Rocco, Chieri; dome of church (1740–1742)
- Santa Maria Maddalena, Foglizzo; parish church, (1741–1742)
- Santi Marco e Leonardo, Turin; church no longer extant (1741–1742)
- Former Église Saint-Gaétan (now Chapelle de la Miséricorde de Nice) and Theatine Convent, Nice (1741)
- Church of the Immaculate Conception, altar of the chapel of St Vincent of Paul, Turin (1742)
- Santa Chiara church, Bra (1742)
- Santa Chiara church, Turin (1742–1745)
- Saint-André church, Chieri, Organ and refectory (1743)
- Church of the Annunciation, Turin, baldachin and main altar (1743–1745)
- Santa Maria di Piazza, Turin (1747) interior layout and dome of church, but not facade
- Santuario Sant'Ignazio at Monte Bastia, Pessinetto; main altar with sculpture by Ignace Perucca (1748)
- Santa Maria di Piazza church, Turin; presbytery of church (1748)
- Reconstruction of the church and monastery of the nuns of St. Mary Magdalene at Mondovì (1749)
- Dome, sanctuary, and campanile of the church Sant'Antonio Abate, Turin (1749–1752)
- Completion of main altar of the Sanctuary of Notre-Dame-des-Anges (original design by Juvarra) (1750)
- San Germano parish church, San Germano Vercellese (1750), dome
- Santa Maria Assunta, Grignasco (1750) parish church
- Santa Maria di Piazza church, Turin (1751–1754)
- San Giorgio, Chieri; facade of church (1752)
- Church of the Confraternity of Santa Croce, Villanova Mondovi (1755)
- San Michele Arcangelo, Rivarolo Canavese (church begun in 1758 and completed by P. Bonvicino)
- Church of the Assumption and San Nicola, Montanaro (enlargement) (1758–1764)
- Duomo of Chieri; 4th chapel on the right (1757-1759)
- Santa Maria Assunta et San Gottardo cathedral, Asti (1764), enlargement of apse
- San Michele Arcangelo, Borgo d'Ale (1770) church
- Abbey church of Fruttuaria, San Benigno Canavese; reconstruction of church with Mario Ludovico Quarini (1770)
- San Luigi Gonzaga Chapel in the cemetery of Corteranzo Monferrato

== Bibliography ==
- Wittkower, Rudolf (1980) [1958]. Art and Architecture in Italy, 1600-1750. Vol. 2 of 3. Penguin Books. pp. 424–432.
- "Vittone, Bernardo Antonio". Grove Art Online. Oxford University Press. 2003. doi:10.1093/gao/9781884446054.article.T089928.
