= Caccia =

Caccia (Italian for "hunt") may refer to:

- Caccia al Re – La narcotici, an Italian television series
- Caccia e Pesca, an Italy-based premium television channel
- Caccia Birch House in New Zealand
- Xagħra, a village in Malta known as Caccia to English residents
- Oboe da caccia, a musical instrument of the oboe family
- Caccia (It:Caccia (musica)), a musical genre of the 14th and 15th centuries employing canon (music)

People

- Ángela Azul Concepción Caccia (born 1998), known by her stage name Ángela Torres, Argentine singer and songwriter
- Camillo Caccia Dominioni (1877 - 1946), Italian Cardinal
- Charles Caccia (1930–2008), Canadian politician
- Diego Caccia (born 1981), Italian cyclist
- Diego Antonio Caccia (born 1971), known by her stage name Diego Torres, Argentine musician and actor
- Federico Caccia (1635 – 1699), an Italian diplomat and Roman Catholic prelate
- Gabriele Giordano Caccia (born 1958), an Italian Catholic prelate and diplomat
- Guglielmo Caccia, a painter known as "il Moncalvo"
- Harold Caccia, Baron Caccia (1905 - 1990), a British diplomat
- Joe Caccia (1899 – 1931), American racecar driver
- Nicola Caccia (born 1970) Italian professional football player
- Orsola Caccia, a painter and daughter of Guglielmo
