= San Giorgio, Chieri =

Roman Catholic church in Chieri, Italy

Coordinates: 45°00′47″N 7°49′34″E

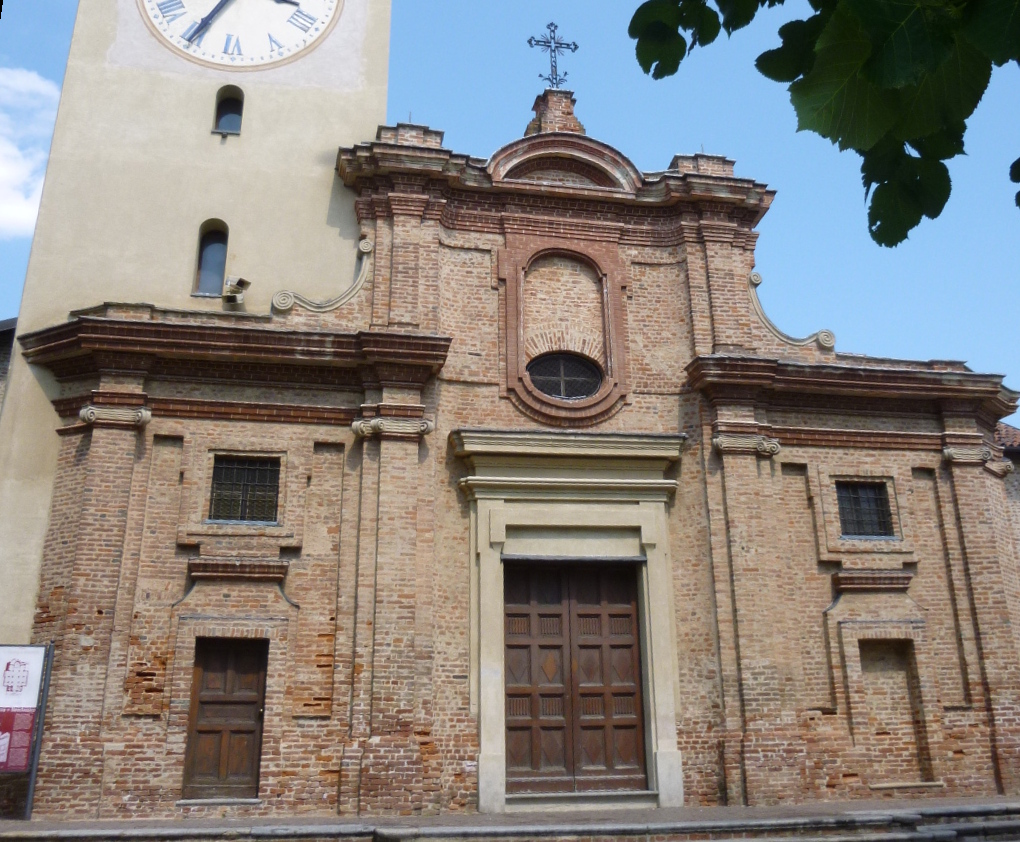

San Giorgio Martire is a Baroque-style, Roman Catholic church located in the town of Chieri, in the metropolitan city of Turin, in the region of Piedmont, Italy.

== History ==
A church or chapel dedicated to St George, at the site was already present by the 11th-century, attached, if not within the walls of a castle at this hilltop. The imposing bell-tower appears to have been built atop a base composed by a castle bastion. The present structure reflects construction over centuries, includes romanesque, gothic, baroque, and neo-gothic elements added at different eras. In 1412, the chapel dedicated to St George was destroyed by a fire, and reconstruction was completed by 1442 under the Lord of Villastellone, this time forming a three nave cruciform church with an apse with buttresses. In the 1500s, the lateral chapels were built, with those on the right abutting with the convent of Minorites (Zoccolanti) with whom the church was affiliated. The facade suffered from structural deficits, and was replaced by the architect Bernardo Vittone, with a playful, although mainly flat facade.

The interior was decorated with floral motifs in the 19th-century by Vincenzo Pangella. The main altarpiece depicts The Resurrection of Christ with Saints Francis and Clare of Assisi (1615) by Guglielmo Caccia (il Moncalvo). The work derives from the former Clarissan monastery in town. The apse also contains canvases depicting four saints: Thomas Aquinas, Antony of Padua, Francis of Assisi, and Stanislao Kostka: painted in 1899 by Angelo Kirchmayr. The first chapel on the right was designed by Vittone, and on the right wall has an altarpiece depicting God the Father (1615) by il Moncalvo. The altarpiece depicts the Holy Family and the Massacre of the Innocents painted by Orsola Maddalena, daughter of il Moncalvo. The third chapel on the right has an altarpiece depicting the Madonna and Child, with young St John the Baptist and other Saints (circa 1619), attributed to Giovanni Crosio. The chapel has a gilded reliquary bust containing putative relics of St George. Inside the church is a damaged bell dating to 1457, which broke in 1912.
