= San Filippo Neri, Chieri =

Roman Catholic church in Chieri, Italy

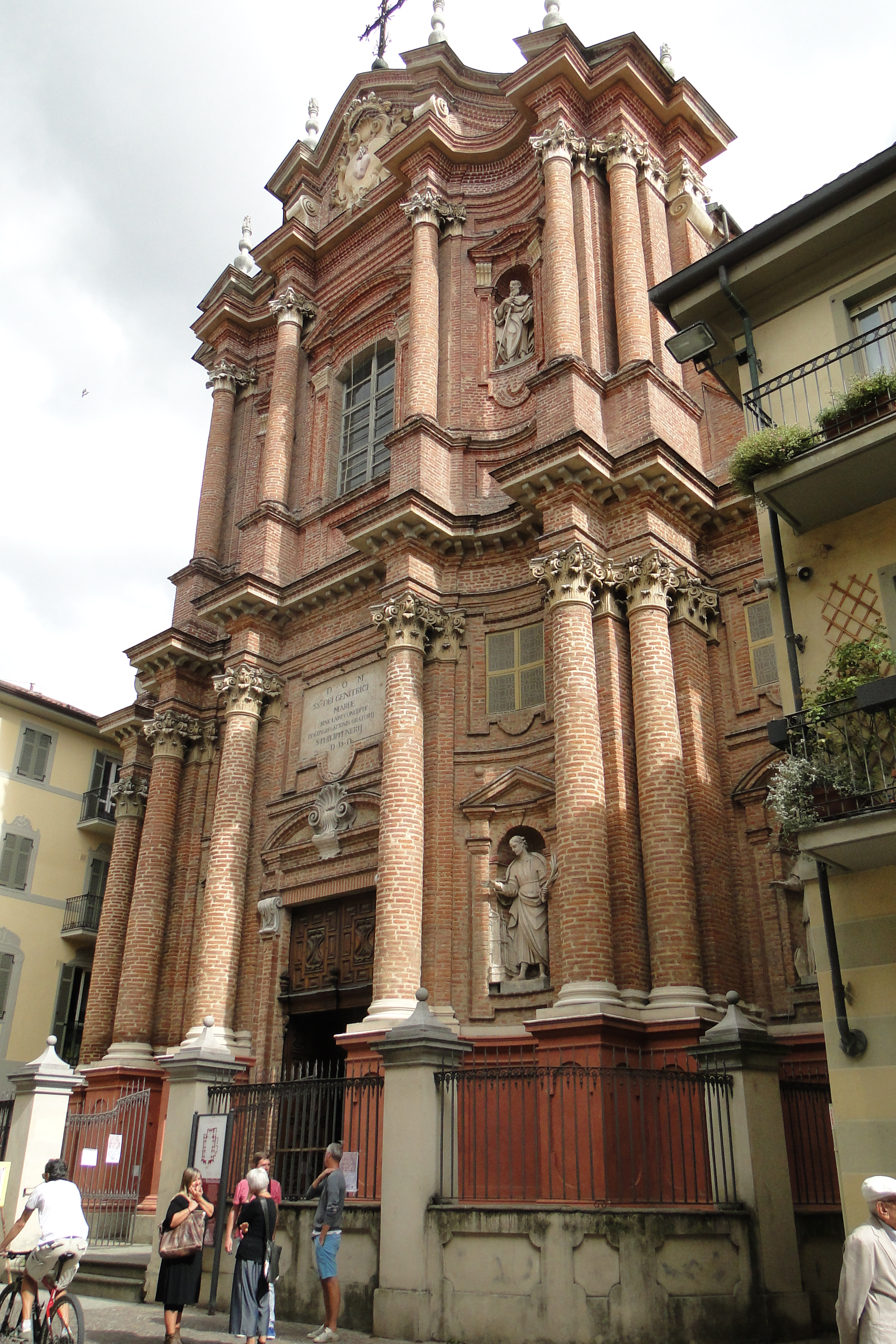

San Filippo Neri, also called the Chiesa dell’Immacolata Concezione (Church of the Immaculate Conception) is a Baroque-style, Roman Catholic church located on Via Vittorio Emenuele II # 61 in the town of Chieri, in the Metropolitan City of Turin, region of Piedmont, Italy. The adjacent seminary is now a museum called Centro Visite Don Bosco, recalling the saint's seminary training here during the early 19th century. The church is part of the parish of the Collegiate Church of Santa Maria della Scala, Chieri.

== History ==
The church was built 1664-1681 for an oratory of the Order of St Phillip Neri, under the patronate of the aristocratic family of Broglia. The architect was Antonio Bettino. The terracotta façade, adorned with six stucco statues, was built very late, between 1722 and 1758, possibly by the Chieri architect Mario Ludovico Quarini. The church still maintains its gothic bell-tower. The lower roofline of the facade has four statues, from left to right, of the saints: Charles Borromeo, Phillip Neri, Valentino Martyr, and Francis de Sales. Above these are statues of Saints Paul and Peter. The offices of this church housed the Main Seminary of Turin from 1821 to 1949. The buildings later affiliated with the Padri Salvatoriani, “Don Lorenzo Milani” middle school, and later became part of a center of Don Bosco and a private school.

The interiors have elaborate polychrome marble altars with 17th-century stucco decoration by Pietro Somasso. The main altarpiece depicts an Immaculate Conception with the Archangel Michael and the Holy Father (1793–1794) by Daniel Seyter. The main relics of the church are those of St Valentine, represented by a wooden sculpture. In the presbytery is the tomb of Giovanni Comollo, a close friend of Giovanni Bosco from the seminary.

The first chapel on the left has an altarpiece depicting the Death of St Charles Borromeo (1710-1712?) by Francesco Fabbrica. The second chapel on the left has an altarpiece depicting the Ecstasy of St Phillip Neri by Stefano Maria Legnani. The first chapel on the right has an altarpiece depicting a Madonna and child with St Francis de Sales (circa 1757) by Francesco Beaumont. The second chapel on the right (chapel of the Sacred Heart) has an altarpiece depicting The apostles Peter and Paul (1711) by Giovanni Battista Parodi. The church has a number of canvases by Mattia Franceschini. A wooden statue of the Immaculate Conception was relocated from the destroyed Chieri church of San Francesco d'Assisi and placed here. The sacristy has a canvas depicting St Phillip Neri renounces appointment as superior general of his order by Caraccioli. In 1681, the organ was transferred from the church of the Annunziata, an operation carried out at his expense by Count Gabaleone, who had acquired the patronage of the chapel of San Francesco de Sales. After the collapse of the dome in 1714, the church was reconstructed by Filippo Juvarra.

Construction on the adjacent convent-seminary was begun in the 17th century for the Oratorians; the architect was Pietro Angelo Galletti. In the early nineteenth century the building was used as a city hall. From 1821 to 1949 it was a diocesan seminary for Turin. Don Bosco studied at the seminary from 1835 to 1841.
