= Santo Stefano Tower =

Medieval tower in Ivrea, Italy

- Torre di Santo Stefano
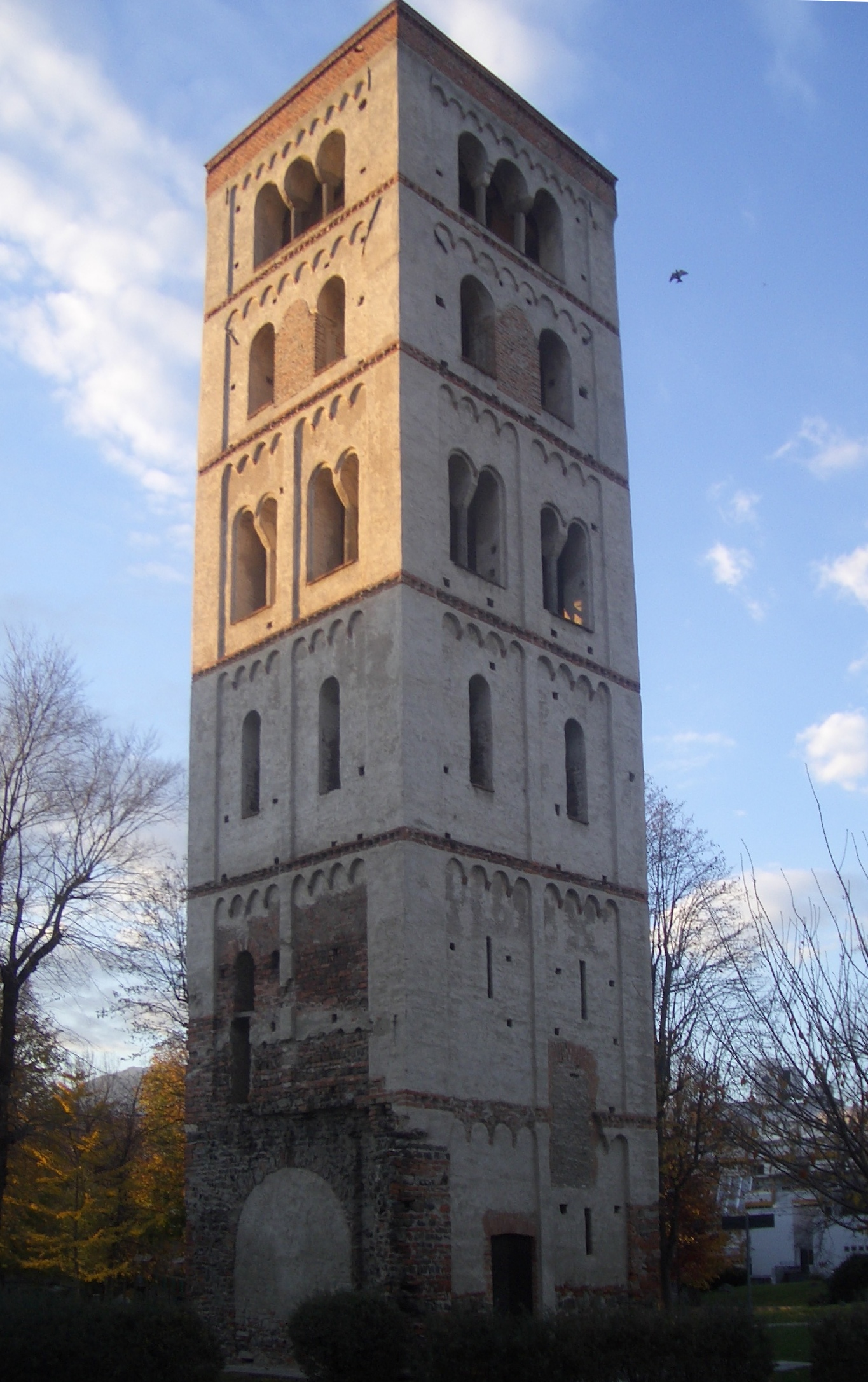
- Santo Stefano Tower in 2007
- Click on the map for a fullscreen view

General information
- Location: Ivrea, Italy
- Coordinates: 45°27′55.76″N 7°52′49.08″E

Santo Stefano Tower (Italian: Torre di Santo Stefano) is a medieval tower located in Ivrea, Italy.

== History ==
Santo Stefano Tower is a Romanesque bell tower, the only surviving part of the lost abbey complex of Santo Stefano, founded by Benedictine monks from Fruttuaria Abbey in 1041 at the behest of Bishop Henry II. The abbey was likely established to address the need to reclaim the marshy left bank of the Dora Baltea river and to ensure surveillance at this strategic point of the city by creating a solid defensive structure with its sturdy walls. The Benedictine monks built the abbey's structures on the site of an ancient chapel dedicated to Saint Stephen, possibly dating back to the 5th century, using bricks and repurposed materials of probable Roman origin.

== Description ==
The tower is located within the Giusiana Gardens.

== Gallery ==
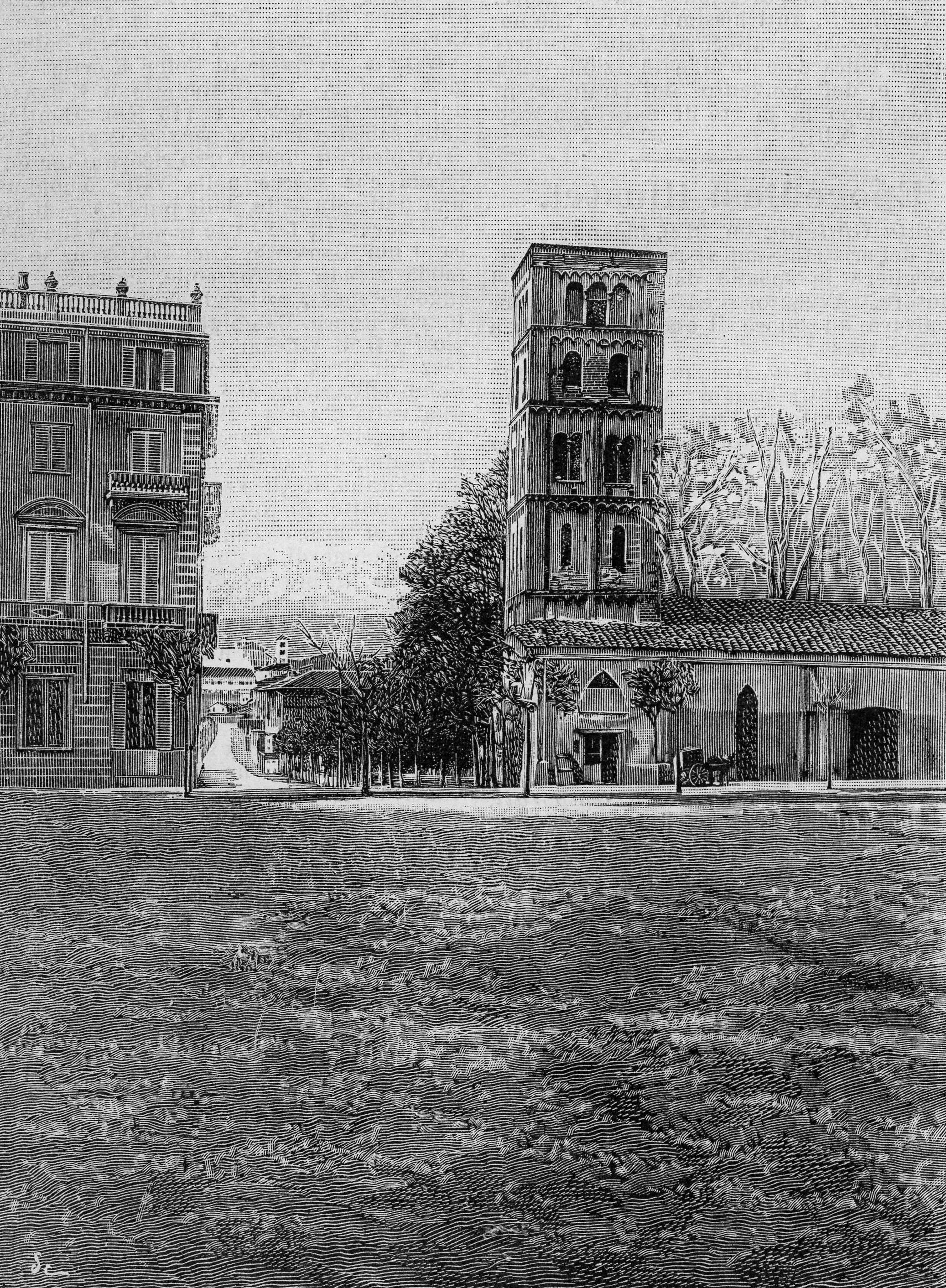

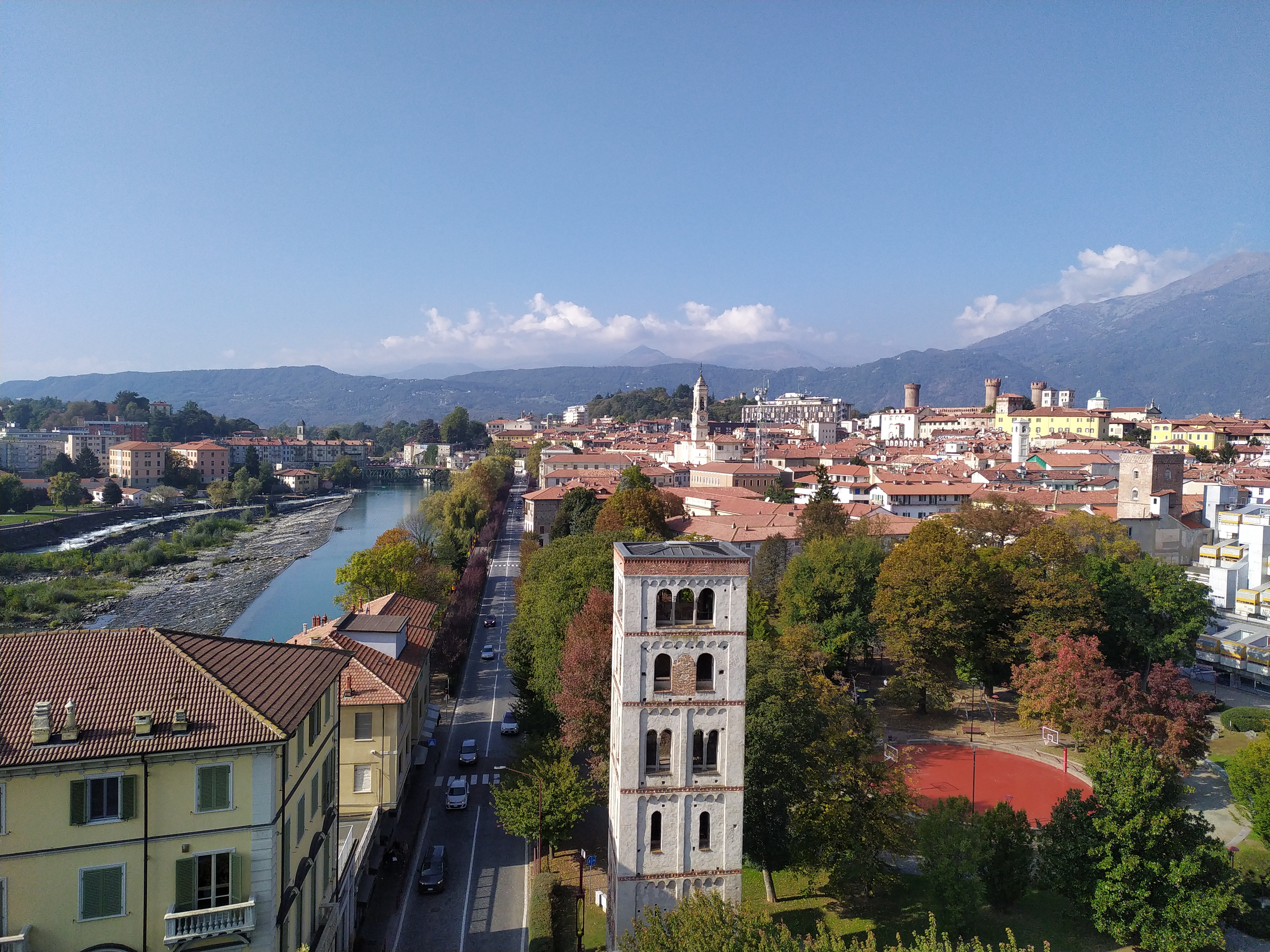

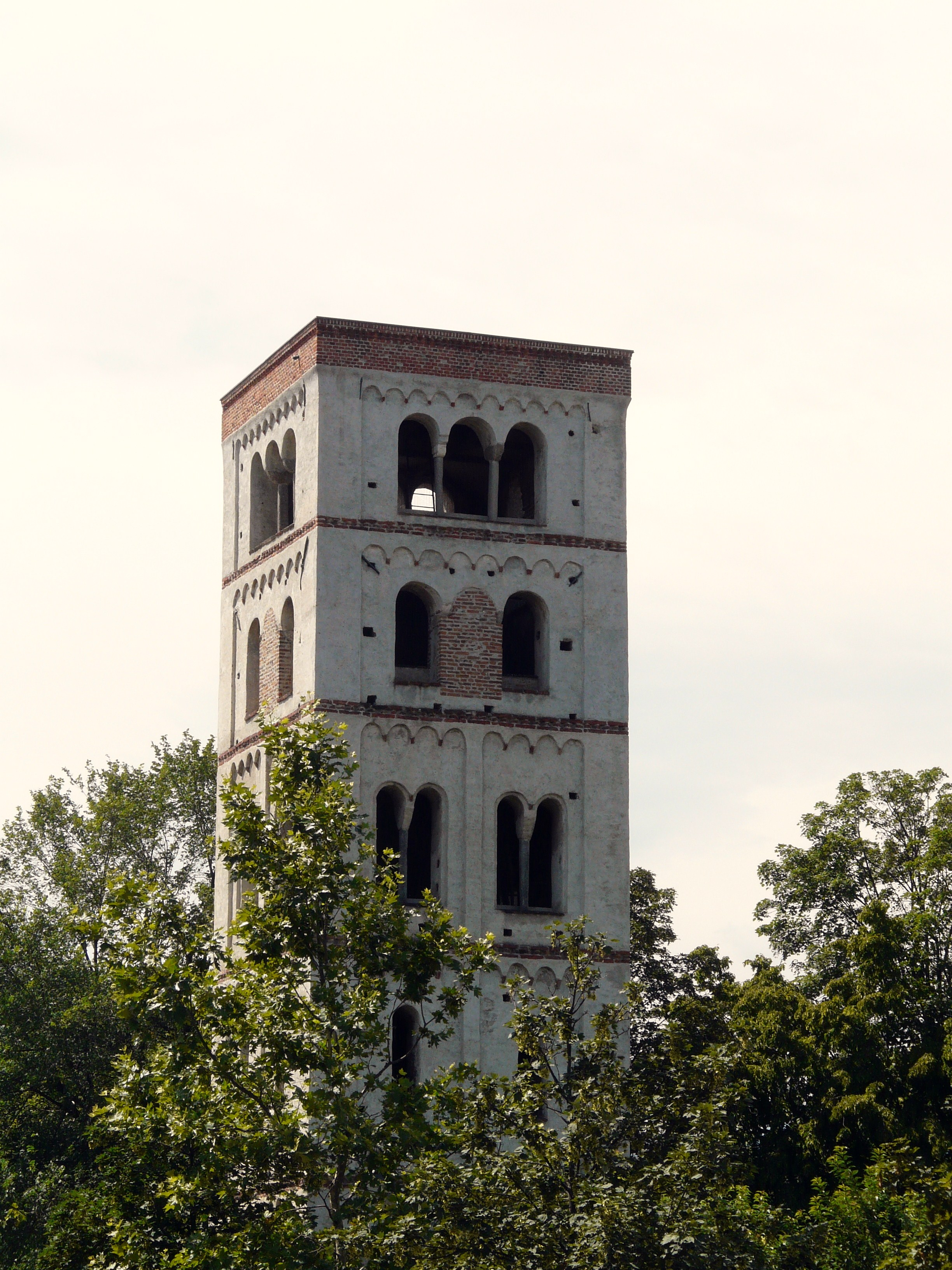
