= Giovanni Crosio =

Italian painter (1583–1654)

Giovanni Crosio (1583 – circa 1654) was an Italian painter active in a Mannerist style.

== Biography ==
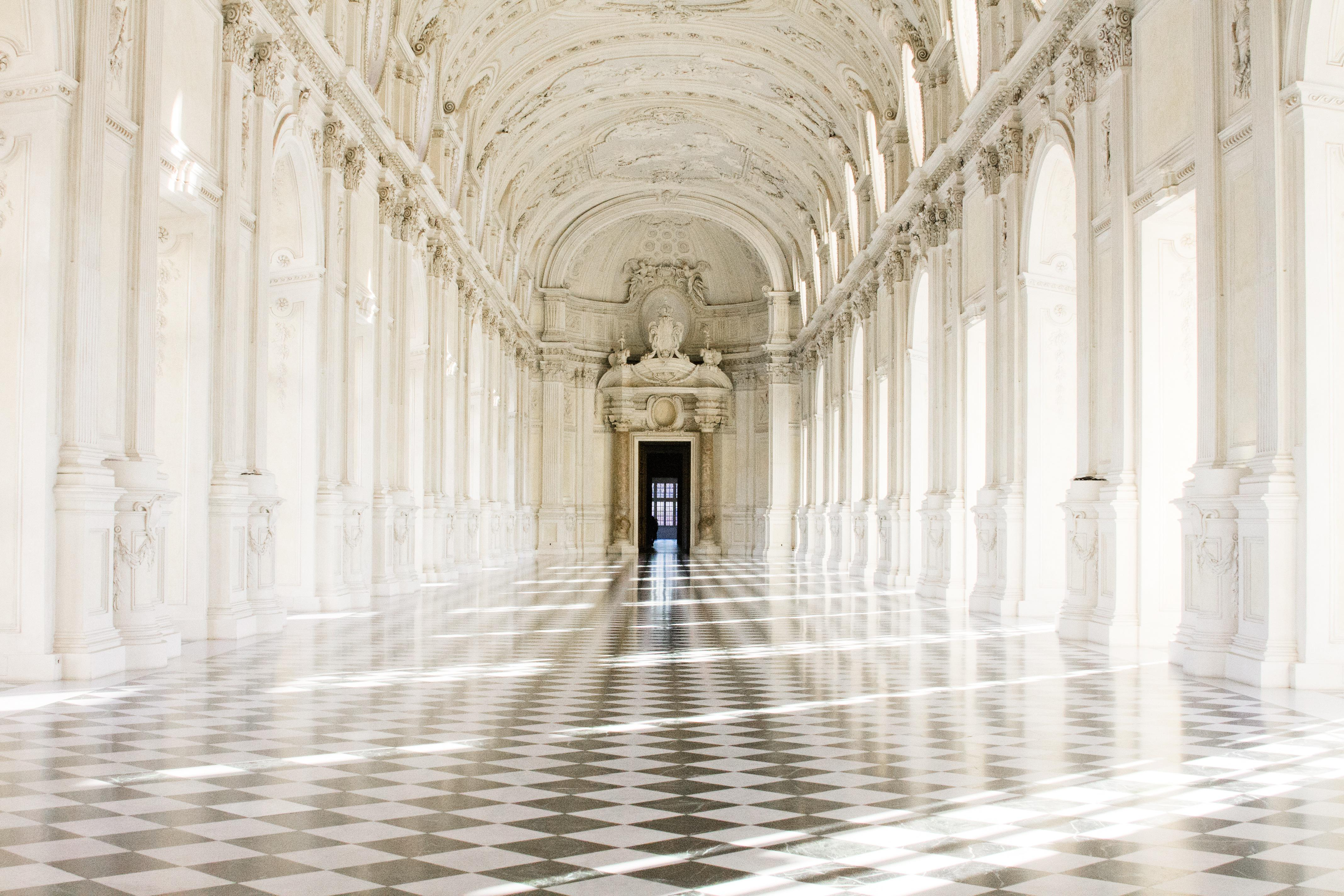
Galleria grande in Reggia di Venaria

He was born in Trino in the Province of Vercelli. He is said to have been initially a follower of Guglielmo Caccia and Federico Zuccari, who were employed as court painters by Carlo Emanuele I. In 1607, he was paid for painting in the Galleria Grande of the Palace of Venaria. He painted mainly in the Piedmont.

He painted a Holy Family and Saints including St John the Evangelist (1619) for the church of San Giorgio Martire in Chieri.
