= Collegiate Church of Santa Maria della Scala, Chieri =

Roman Catholic church in Chieri, Italy

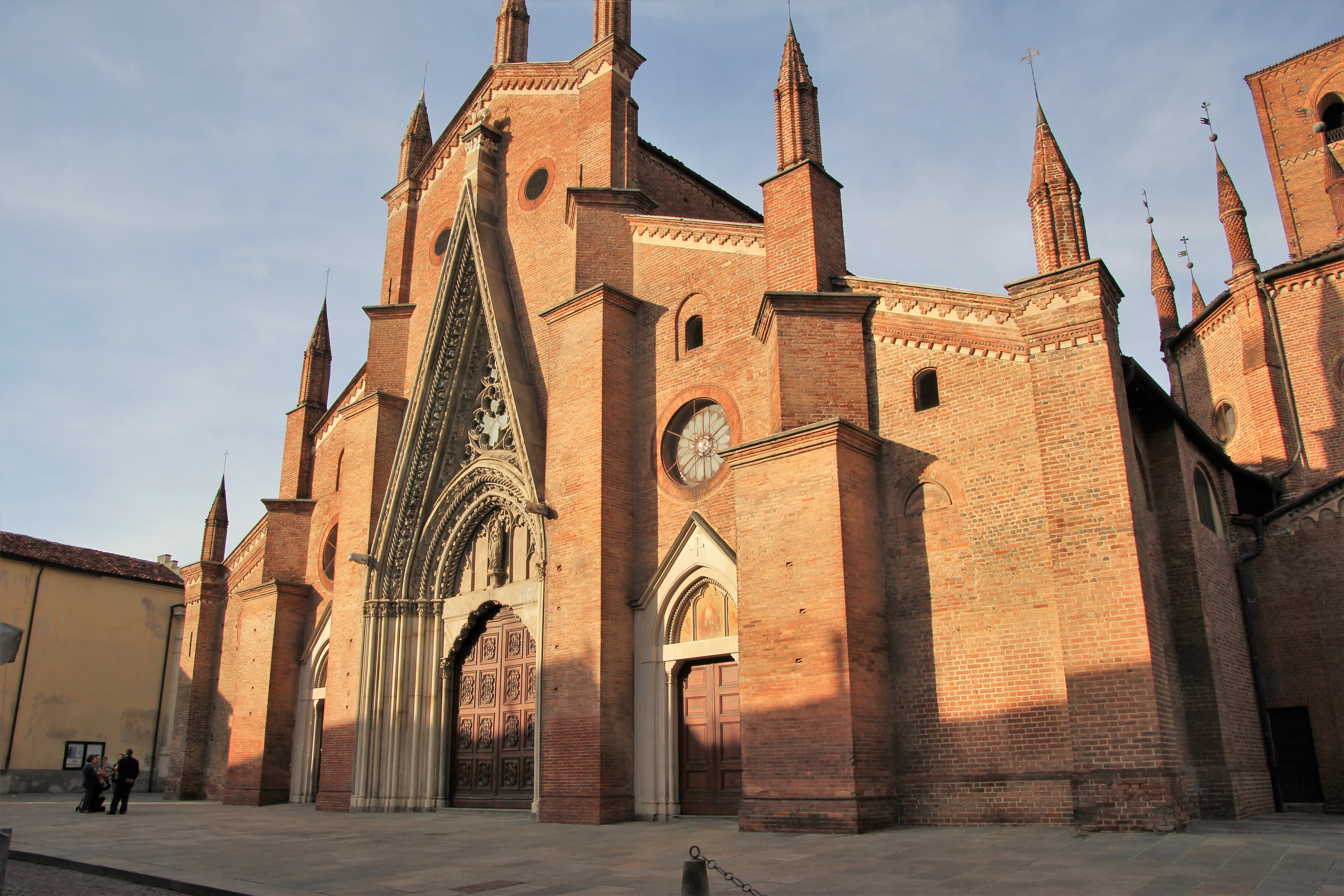
West front of the church

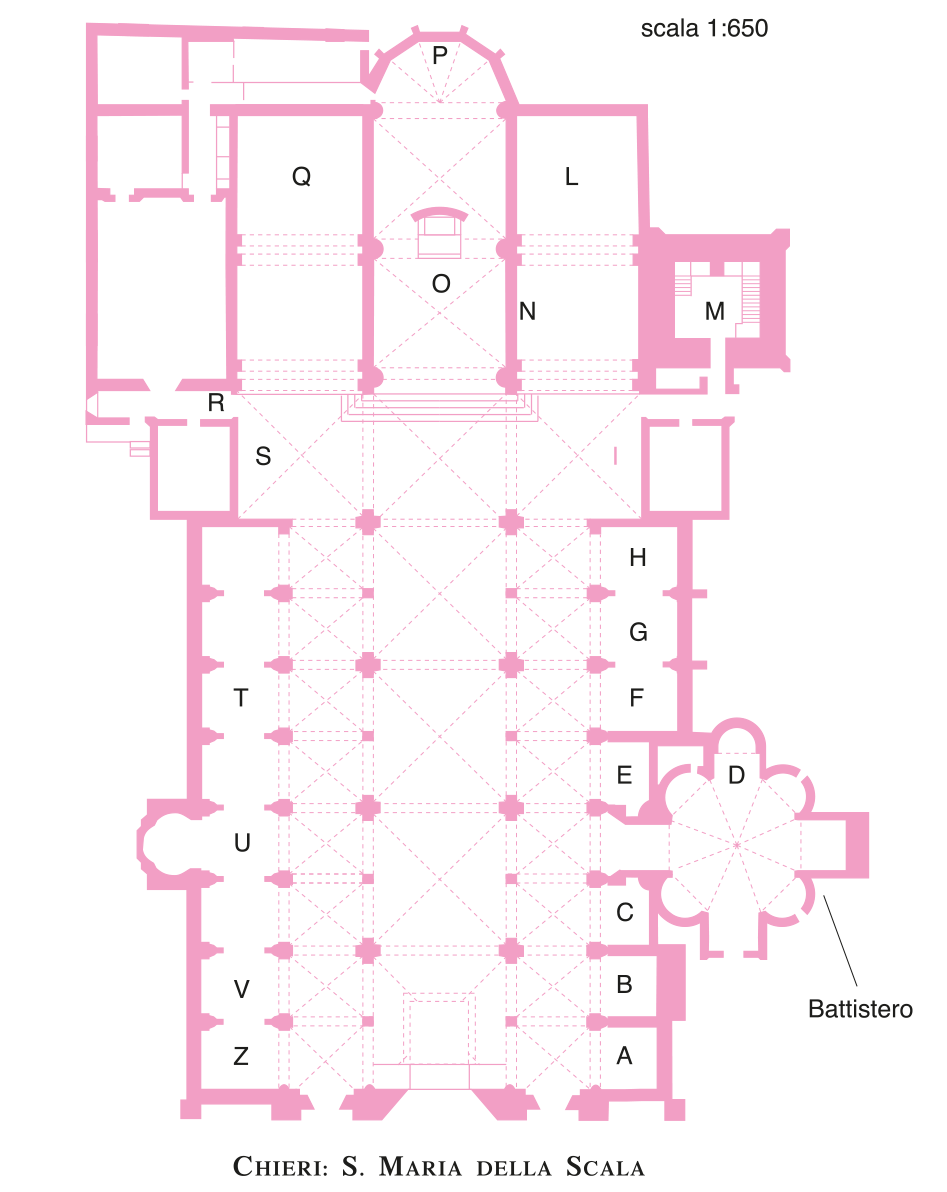
Chieri. S. Maria della Scala. (A) First chapel with the tombstone of Bernardino Biscaretti (1572), knight of Philip II. (B) Second chapel, Doubting of St. Thomas, attributed to Giovanni Andrea Casella. (C) Third chapel, Nativity by an unknown 16th-century artist. (D) Left altar. (E) Fourth chapel, Madonna and Child with Saints Sebastian and Anthony Abbot by Moncalvo. (F) Fifth chapel, Visitation by Robert Levoyer. (G) Sixth chapel. (H) Seventh chapel, Risen Christ with Saints Francis and Magdalene by Giovanni Crosio. (I) Right transept. (L) Chapel of Corpus Domini. (M) Gallieri Chapel. (N) Crypt. (O) Presbytery. (P) Pentagon-shaped apse. (Q) Chapel of the Crucifix. (R) Sacristy. (S) Left transept. Left nave: (T) Sixth chapel dedicated to Saints Julian and Basilissa. (U) Fourth chapel dedicated to Madonna delle Grazie, Julian and Basilissa. (V) Second chapel. (Z) First chapel.

The Collegiate Church of Santa Maria della Scala in Chieri (Italian: Chiesa Collegiata di Santa Maria della Scala; Duomo di Chieri) is a late-Gothic Roman Catholic collegiate church, and the principal church or duomo, in the town of Chieri, Province of Turin, region of Piedmont, Italy.

== History ==
An ancient church on the site was erected by Bishop Landolfo of Turin in the 11th century, putatively on the site of a temple to Minerva.

The present church was rebuilt in the first decade of the 15th century, initially under the patronage of the Balbi and Bertoni families. The façade has buttresses and a tall stone portal sculpted with Romanesque motifs. The interior has three naves.

== Interior ==
The Chapel of the Blessed Virgin of the Graces (Beata Vergine della Grazie) was designed (1757) by Bernardo Vittone in order to house a venerated statue of the titular image of the Virgin (1637) by Botto. The other chapels include the Turinetti, decorated with stucco, as well as the chapels of the Crucifix and the Corpus Domini (Eucharist), which hold 17th-century canvases. In the southern nave is a canvas depicting the Resurrection of Christ by Francesco Fea and a fresco depicting the Adoration by the Magi in the Chapel of the Tabussi.

In the south transept is a Renaissance tabernacle attributed to Matteo Sanmicheli that houses an altarpiece depicting Saints Anthony Abbot and Sebastian, painted by Guglielmo Caccia. The north transept has an altarpiece depicting the Trinity by Giovanni Crosio. Behind the main altar are carved 15th-century wooden choir stalls. At the base of the bell tower, in the Gallieri Chapel, are a series of 13th-century frescoes depicting the life of John the Baptist, which were restored in the 20th century.

The sacristy contains Renaissance furniture and a 17th-century altarpiece of the Resurrection. The adjacent baptistry has the Tana Polyptych (1503) and 15th-century frescoes depicting the Passion of Christ by Guglielmo Fantini.
