= Chiesa delle Orfanelle, Chieri =

Roman Catholic church in Piedmont, Italy

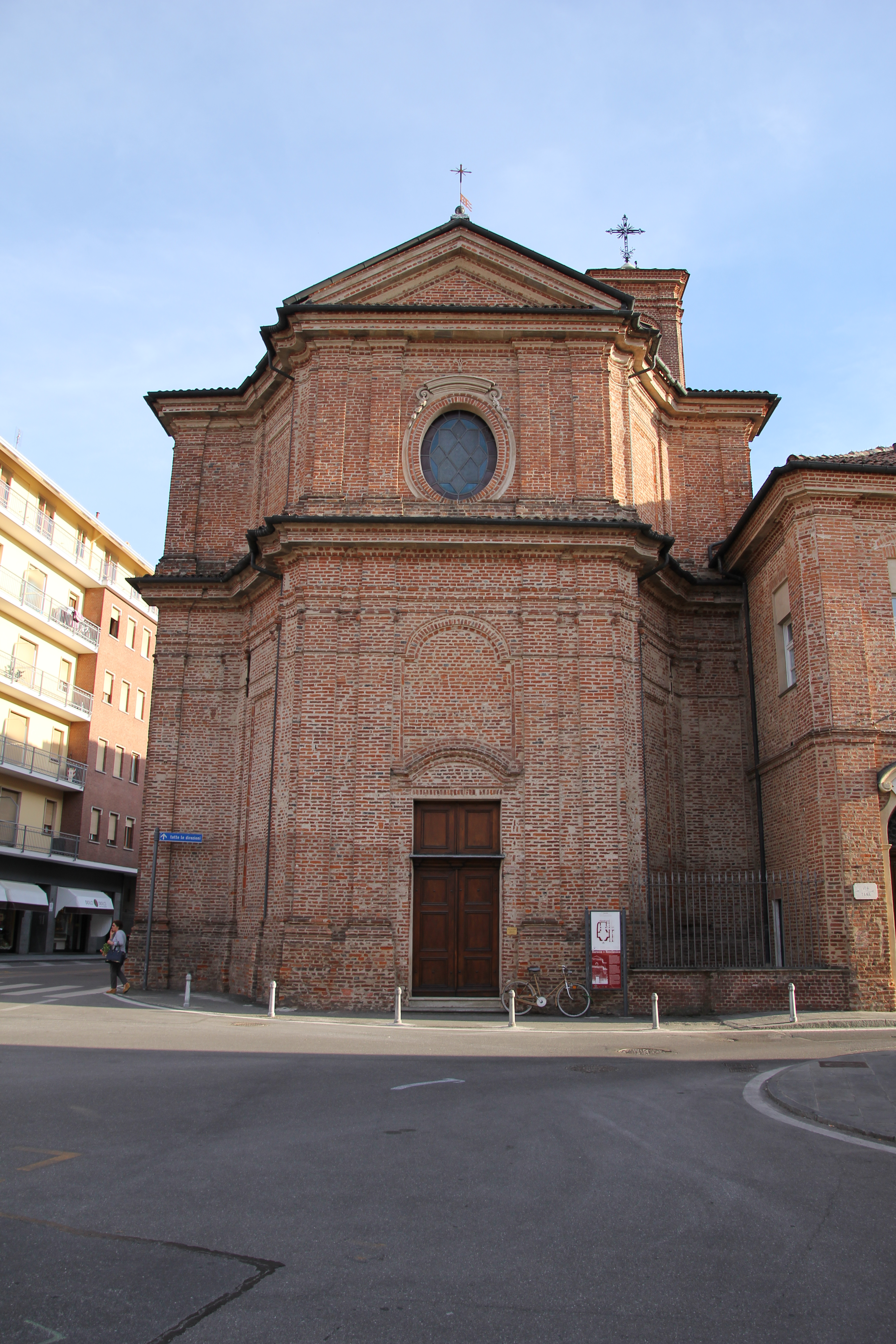

The Chiesa delle Orfanelle is a Baroque-style, Roman Catholic church located on Via Tana #5 in the town of Chieri, Province of Turin, region of Piedmont, Italy.

== History ==
The church was attached to the former orphanage of Chieri, instituted by a private donor after the plague of 1630. Construction of the church was begun in 1726, and left incomplete until completed from 1744 to 1767. The architect was designed by Giovanni Antonio Sevalle, while the orphanage was designed by Bernardo Antonio Vittone.

The main altar (1775) was designed by Giuseppe Michele Vay. The lateral chapels have stucco decorations by Giuseppe Antonio Riva. The main altarpiece depicts the Annunciation of Mary (1646) by Francesco Fea. The chapel on the right has an altarpiece depicting Saints Anne and Joachim with child Mary and St Joseph. The chapel on the left has a 19th-century altarpiece depicting St Jerome Emiliani commends an orphan and his teacher to heaven by Alberto Maso Gilli. The modern Via Crucis (2000) was completed by Nando Luraschi.
