= Giuseppe Avezzana =

Italian soldier (1797–1879)

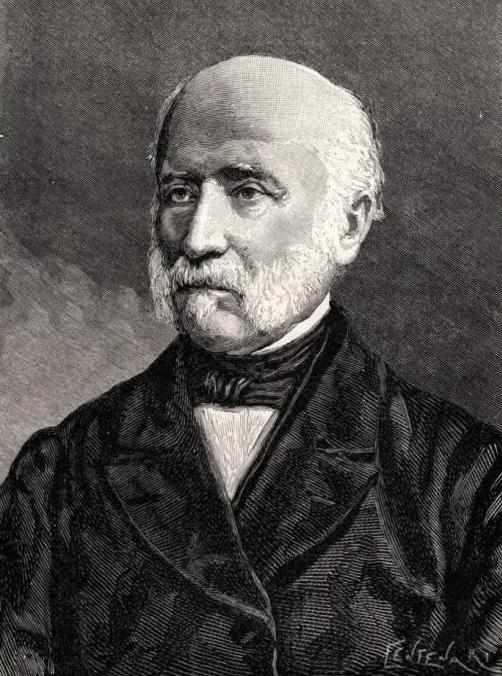
- Born: February 1797
- Died: 1879
- Occupations: soldier; businessman

Giuseppe Avezzana was an Italian soldier and businessman. He fought in wars in Europe and the Americas.

== Biography ==
Avezzana was born in Chieri, Italy, on February 19, 1797. In 1812, his family moved to Turin, where his father, Lorenzo Molino, had established a business. Shortly thereafter, Avezzana enlisted in the Hussars. On June 15, 1812, he enlisted as a volunteer for the 4th Region of the French Army Imperial Honor Guard, which was headed for Strasbourg. In December 1813, Avezzana fractured his leg at Lorraine and retreated to Milan.

Avezzana served under Napoleon I from 1813 through the fall of the First French Empire. He then joined the Sardinian army. In 1815, he fought against Napoleon I, who had escaped from Elba. Avezzana fought against Ferdinand VII’s restoration to the Spanish throne in September 1823, and was captured and held prisoner for several weeks. After his release, he sailed to America.

In June 1827, he was in Mexico, defending the State of Tamaulipas against the Spaniards, who had invaded under General Barradas. Superior numbers almost lead him to retreat, but he managed to rally a force sufficiently strong to defend the invasion.

In 1832, Antonio López de Santa Anna organized a revolution against the government of Anastasio Bustamante. Avezzana supported the revolt, and General Montezuma left him in command at Tampico while he stirred up revolutionaries elsewhere. Avenzzana successfully maneuvered a small force at Ciudad Victoria, capturing artillery, supplies, and three times as many government troops as he commanded. Thereafter, he pursued the government forces, retrieving the disasters that Santa Anna and Montezuma suffered. Mainly through his military leadership, the liberal cause triumphed.

After resigning his command in 1834, Avezzana went into business in New York City. He married an Mary Frances Morrogh, the daughter of an Irish diplomat, and led a quiet mercantile life until the Italian Revolutions of 1848. Promptly returning to Italy, he fought the Austrians and Sardinians at Genoa, and then he and a few thousand followers defended Rome for two months against 100,000 soldiers in the allied armies. After the rebels were crushed within a year, he escaped to America and resumed his mercantile life in New York.

He died in Rome in 1879.

== Memorials ==
A street in Rome, Italy, is named in honor of Giuseppe Avezzana.
