= Giusiana Gardens =

Public gardens in Ivrea, Italy

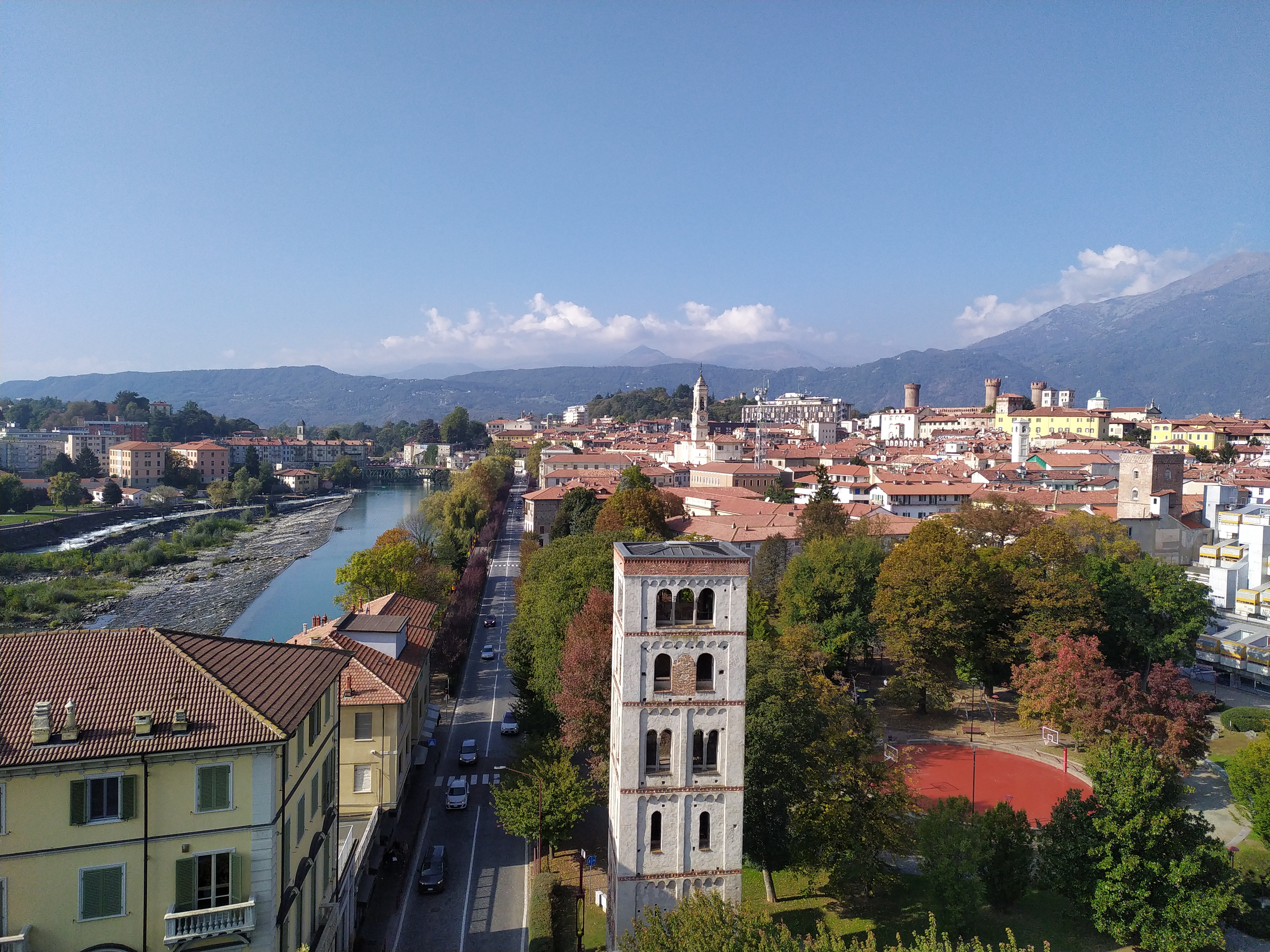
- Giusiana Gardens in 2021
- Interactive map of Giusiana Gardens
- Location: Ivrea, Italy
- Coordinates: 45.465724°N 7.879613°E
- Area: 1.3 hectares (3.2 acres)

Giusiana Gardens (Italian: Giardini Giusiana) are a public park located in Ivrea, Italy.

== History ==
The area now occupied by the Giusiana Gardens stands on the site of the former Benedictine abbey complex of Santo Stefano, founded in the 11th century and gradually demolished between the 16th and 18th centuries. In 1757, Count Carlo Baldassarre Perrone di San Martino, owner of neighbouring Palazzo Giusiana, had the remaining structures torn down to expand the garden of his residence, preserving only the bell tower, now known as the Santo Stefano Tower. The count also commissioned the construction of two small temples, designed by the architect Borra, which no longer survive. At the end of the 19th century, the garden was reorganized and opened to the public in conjunction with the development of the new riverfront.

== Description ==
The gardens cover approximately 1.3 hectares (3.2 acres) between Corso Botta and Corso Re Umberto I, and form the main green space in Ivrea's historic centre. They feature mature trees, lawns, and gravel pathways with seating areas, as well as playgrounds and spaces for sports and recreational activities. Within the park are several monuments and memorials, including the Santo Stefano Tower, a stele dedicated to those who fell in the Resistance, a fountain honoring locals who died in the liberation war, and a larger historic circular fountain with a central water jet.
