= Palazzo Mercadillo, Chieri =

Coordinates: 45°00′45″N 7°49′33″E

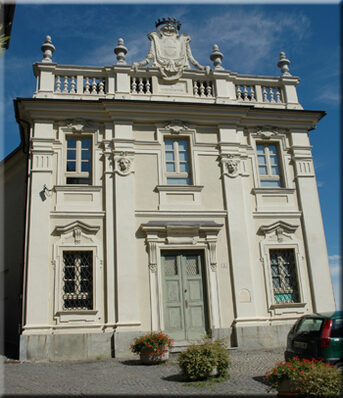

The Palazzo Mercadillo is a late-Baroque style palace in the historic center of Chieri, region of Piedmont, Italy. It is located on Via Giacomo Nel where it intersects with Via San Giorgio. Formerly the city hall of the town for nearly four centuries, since 1847 it has housed a private elementary school. It rises adjacent to the Church of San Guglielmo with the main facade on Via Nel facing the palaces of the Opesso and Valfrè.

== History ==
This small palace was formed by the joining of two medieval houses on the site, and served as a meeting place for the city council as well as housing the town prison. Prior council meetings were held at the church of San Guglielmo. In 1772, the palace was refurbished and the facade built to the design by the architect Mario Quarini, whose more sober and classic design supplanted a prior designs by his mentor, Bernardo Vittone.
