= San Guglielmo, Chieri =

Roman Catholic church in Chieri, Italy

Coordinates: 45°00′44″N 7°49′34″E

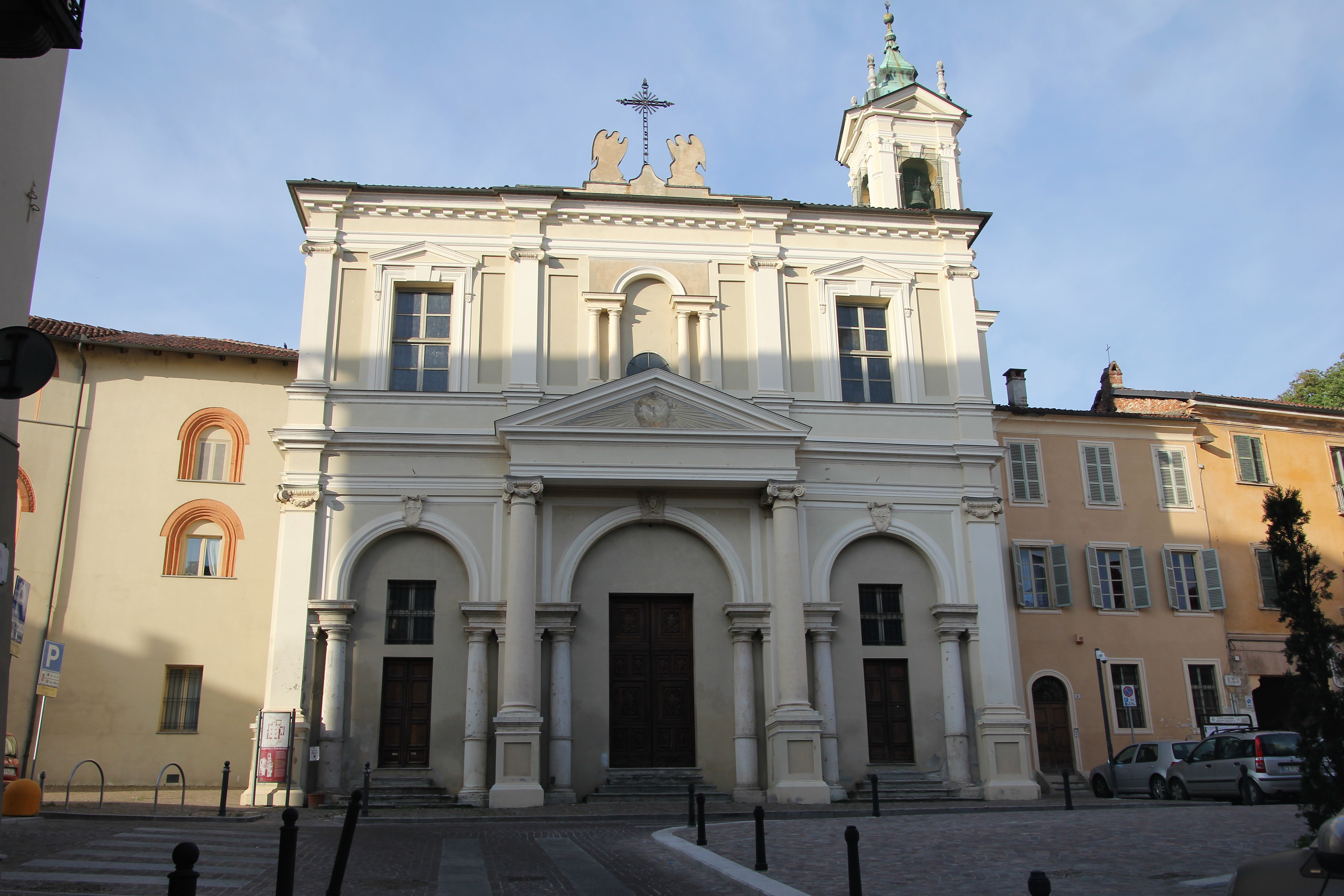
Facade with bell tower

San Guglielmo is a Roman Catholic church located in the town of Chieri, in the metropolitan city of Turin, in the region of Piedmont, Italy. It stands adjacent to the Palazzo Mercadillo.

== History ==
Built in the 15th century, the church has since the 16th century been affiliated with the Confraternity of the Holy Spirit. The Baroque-style bell tower was designed by Giovanni Battista Feroggio. In the 18th-century, the interior was decorated with rococo stucco. The main altar was sculpted by Francesco Riva.

The chapel to the right of the main altar has a canvas depicting the Adoration of the Magi by Francesco Fea. The relics of St Theodore Martyr are housed in a niche. At one time, one of the aims of the confraternity was the conversion of Jews from the adjacent Ghetto.
