= San Michele, Casale Monferrato =

Roman Catholic church in Casale Monferrato, Italy

San Michele is a Renaissance-style, Roman Catholic church located on Via della Rovere, in Casale Monferrato, Province of Alessandria, region of Piedmont, Italy.

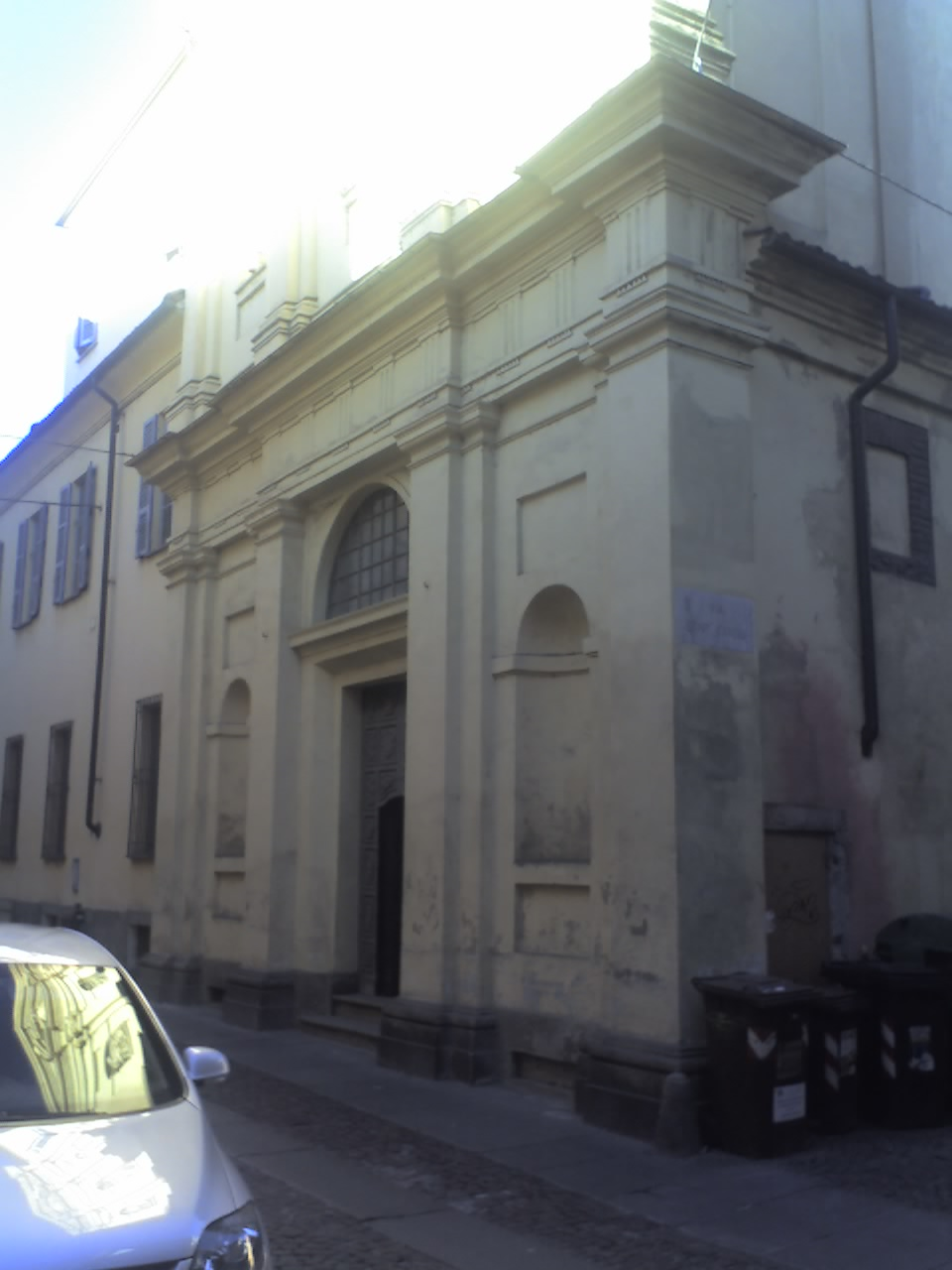
Facade on street

== History ==
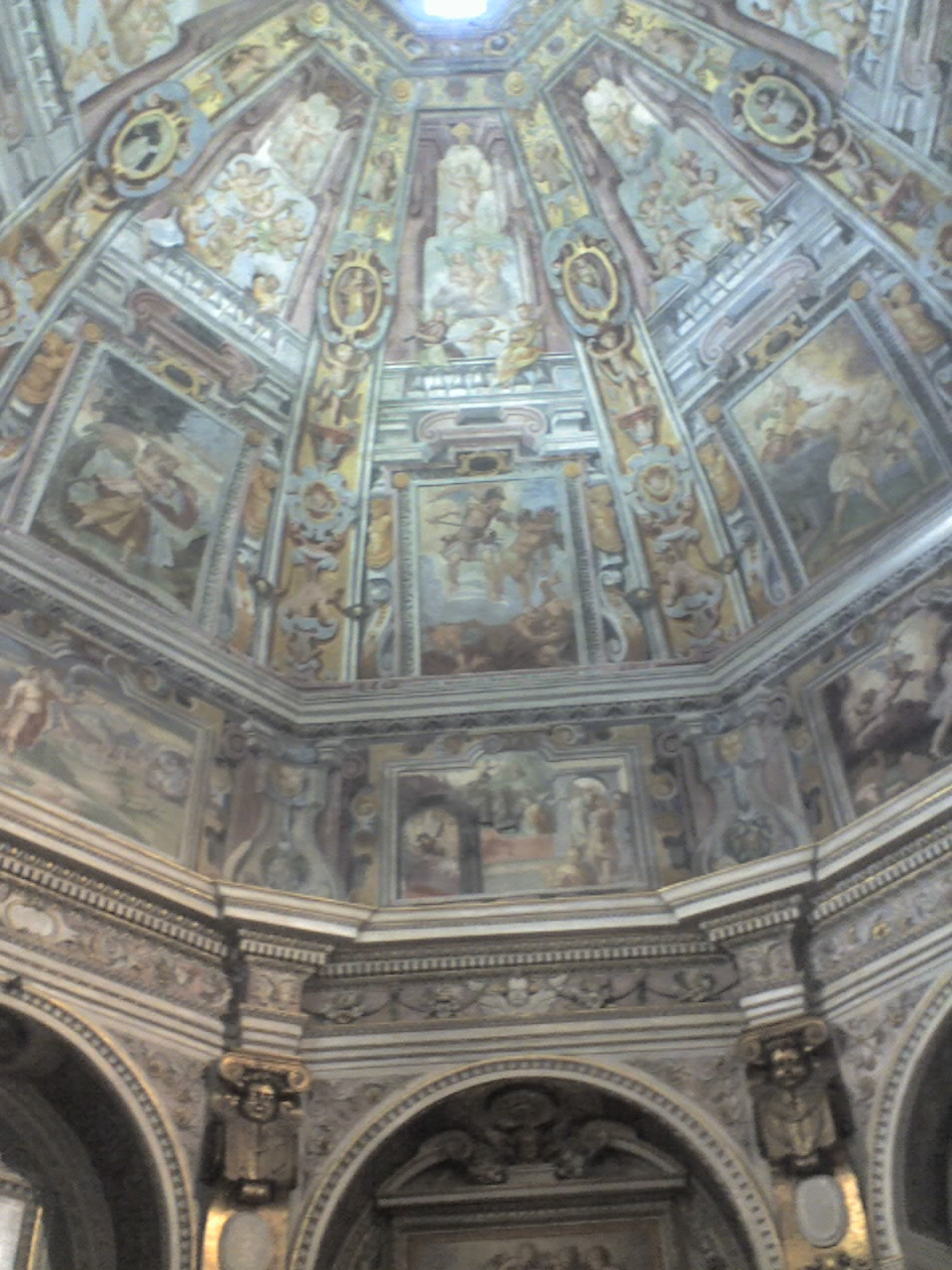
Cupola with frescoes

This church or oratory was erected by the Confraternity of San Michele, also called dei Nobili (aristocracy), which was granted in the 16th century this land next to the Cathedral cemetery. The nave is octagonal in shape and has a cupola frescoed starting in 1597 by Giovanni Antonio Cassano. The frescoes depict the Stories of the Archangels Michael, Raphael, and Gabriel. The frescoes are ringed with grotesque decorations. In 1601, the interior had stucco decoration. The church also has a series of canvases depicting the Annunciation, the Announcement to the Shepherds, a Nativity, St Michael Archangel, the Madonna of the Assumption with St Francis and a Certosini, and Repose in Egypt are attributed (before 1614) to Giovanni Romano and Guglielmo Caccia (Il Moncalvo). The Dream of St Joseph (1627) was painted by Guglielmo Crosio.
