= David Levi (Italy) =

Italian-Jewish poet (1816–1898)

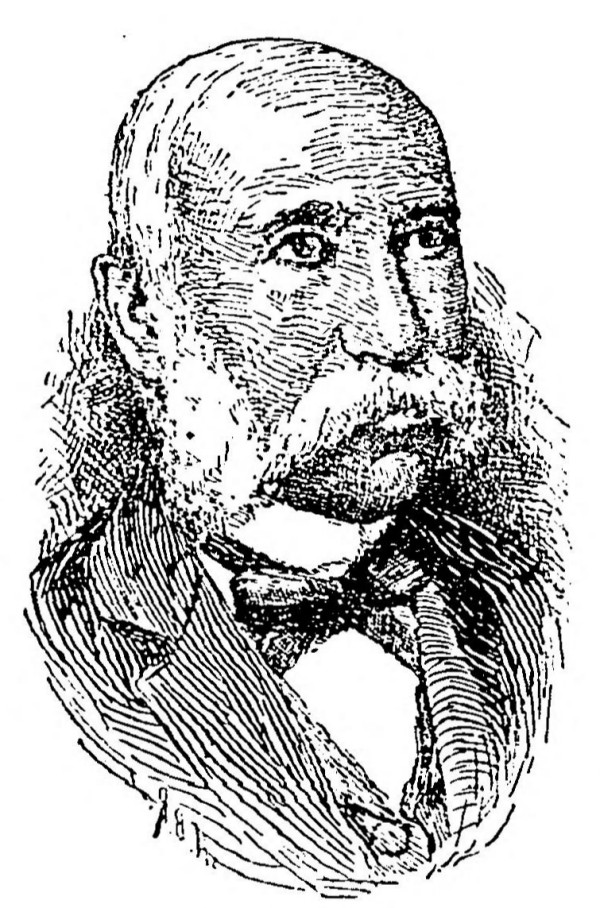
On.Gr.Uff.David Levi

Davide Levi (1816 in Chieri – 18 October 1898 in Venice) was an Italian poet, patriot and politician.

== Biography ==
Educated at the Jewish schools of his native town and Vercelli, he for a short time followed a mercantile career. In 1835 he went to the University of Parma, and later to that of Pisa, but he had to leave the latter on account of a duel in which he wounded a fellow student whom he had challenged for having made an insulting remark about the Jews. Having passed his examination as doctor of law, he went in 1839 to Paris. The university ideals of a united, free Italy had found a strong follower in Levi, who had become a member of the irredentist society La Giovane Italia. In Paris he belonged to the circle of Italian patriots; and, on returning to Italy, he soon became one of the leaders in the political movement for the secession of northern Italy from the Austrian Empire and for the union of all the Italian states.

Settling in Venice, Levi took part in the Lombardic rebellion against Austria of 1848-49. In 1850 he moved to Turin. After the Franco-Italian-Austrian War of 1859, when the Italian provinces of Austria were united with the Kingdom of Italy (1860), he was elected to the Italian assembly at Florence, where, as a member of the Liberal Party, he championed the cause of equality of rights and religious freedom. He was a member of the National Assembly until 1879, when, being defeated, he retired from politics.

Levi wrote many poems, especially during his stay at Venice, and a large number of political and war songs, among these the well-known ode to Pope Pius IX, who in 1846, upon his election to the papal chair, was hailed as liberator, but who in 1849 changed his political views and became strongly reactionary. Through all Levi's works his great love for Italy and for Judaism is evident.

Levi was the author of: Patria ed Affetti (Venice, 1849), a collection of poems; Gli Martiri del 1799 (Turin, 1850), a drama; Martirio e Redenzione (ib. 1859); Del Navarra a Magenta (ib. 1866; revised ed., 1884, with a fantastic allegorical dialogue as a second part); Vita di Pensiero (Milan, 1875); Vita d'Azione (Turin, 1882); Il Semitismo (ib. 1884); La Mente di Michelangelo (ib. 1890); Giordano Bruno (ib. 1894).

== Il Profeta ==
Levi's principal work, however, is the great drama Il Profeta. Its theme Levi describes in his introduction as follows: "I intend to hold a mirror before my contemporaries, in which they may see their errors, faults, and mistakes, and thereby learn to despise them; at the same time placing before them a high ideal, which they should strive to live up to." To this end, he selected the story of Jeremiah. The drama treats in five acts of the war between Zedekiah and Nebuchadnezzar. Jeremiah foresees the fall of Jerusalem, if the people do not give up their worship of Baal, repent of their sins, and return to the only true God. Jeremiah the prophet and Ananias, the priest of Baal, respectively exhort and try to persuade the king and the Jews to follow them. Ananias is successful; Jeremiah is thrown into prison; and Jerusalem falls when attacked by the invading army. The Temple is destroyed, and the Jews are led into captivity. Jeremiah's prophecy is fulfilled.

When Jeremiah is thrown into prison his daughter Rachel falls into the hands of Ananias, who tries to win her for himself. His suit proving unsuccessful, he orders her to be sacrificed to Moloch, when God intercedes. Lightning kills Ananias, and Rachel is liberated by her lover, Emanuel. The last words of Ananias are: "Uno Infinito hai vinto" (end of Act 3). Emanuel joins the ranks of the defender of Jerusalem, is mortally wounded, and dies in the arms of his beloved. Spiritually Jewdom has conquered over heathendom, and Rachel has returned pure to her lover, but physically Jewdom is defeated. Rachel loses her lover and must go into exile; this exile will, however, purify not the Jews alone, but through them the world, and will prepare man for a better future.

The dialogue which follows the drama in the 1884 edition has very little connection with it. It is sustained by Emanuel, the representative of prophetism, and by Ahasuerus, the representative of mankind, and treats mainly of Rome.

== Honours ==
- Knight of the order of the Italian Crown.
- Official of the order of the Italian Crown.
- Commander of the order of the Italian Crown.
- Great Official of the order of the Italian Crown
