= Mario Ludovico Quarini =

Italian architect and writer

Mario Ludovico Quarini (1736 – 1808) was an Italian architect. He was active in the Piedmont, and completed unfinished projects of Bernardo Antonio Vittone. He began his career in the exuberant baroque of Vittone, but moved into more neoclassical styles. He was born in Chieri.

He completed (1776) the work of Vittone for the Abbey of Fruttuaria di San Benigno Canavese. He enlarged (1772) the Palazzo Mercadillo in Chieri.

He completed the facade (1792) of the church of San Bernardino in Chieri; the belltowers are older. He designed the scenographic church San Giacomo Maggiore of Balangero (1774). He designed an altar for the church of monastery of the Annunziata in Turin, moved to the parish church of San Maurizio Canavese. He designed the Cathedral of Fossano. He contributed to the designs the Salone delle Adunanze (dei due Mappamondi) in the Accademia delle Scienze in Turin, which was finally decorated by quadratura painter Giovannino Galliari.
