= San Domenico, Chieri =

Roman Catholic church in Chieri, Italy

Coordinates: 45.01°N 7.83°E

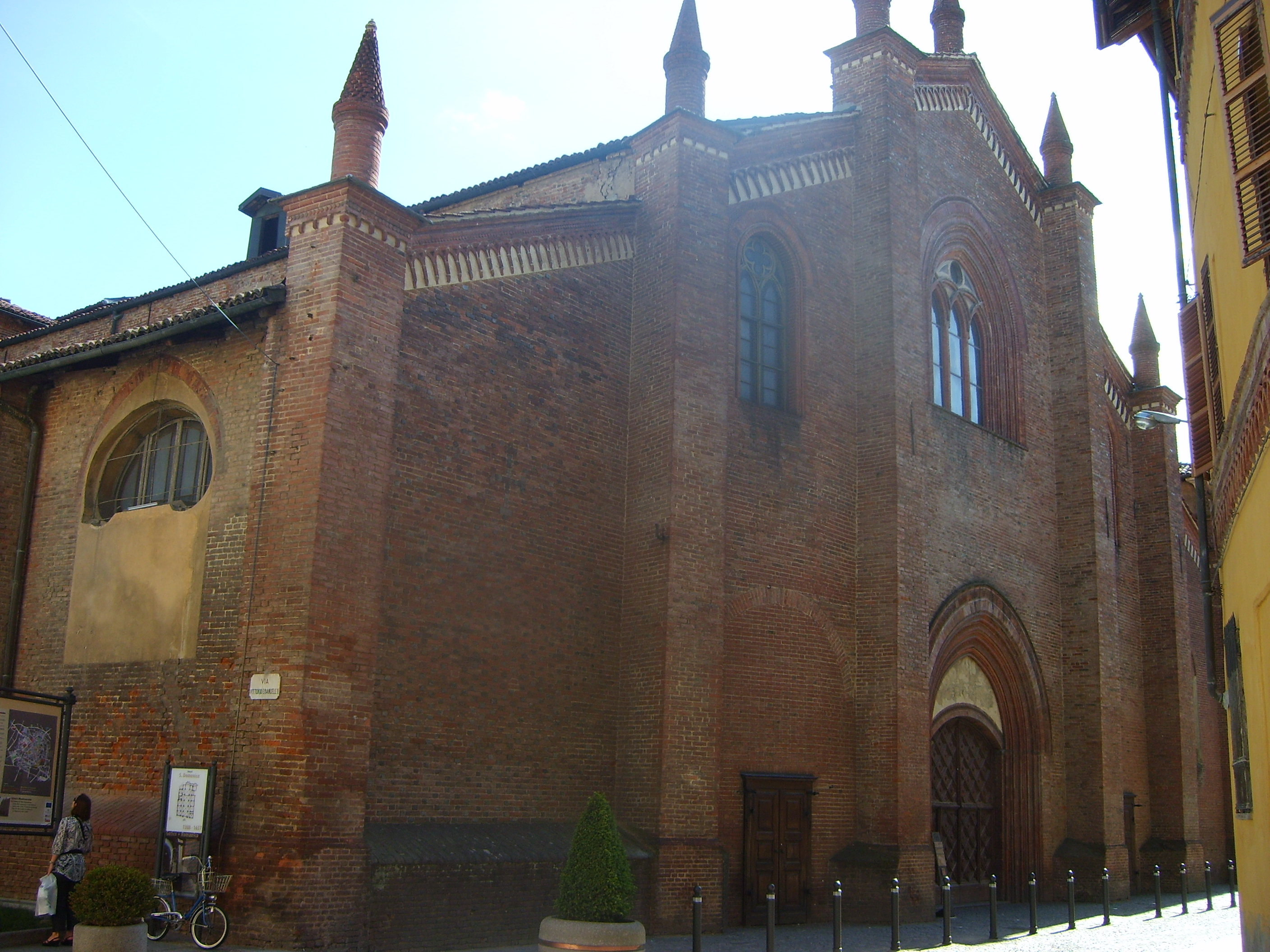
Facade of church

San Domenico is a Gothic-style, Roman Catholic church and convent located on Via San Domenico #1 in the town of Chieri, Province of Turin, region of Piedmont, Italy.

== History ==
Initially, the Dominicans had been welcomed at the end of the 13th-century to Chieri by the Broglia family.

Construction of the church and convent began in the 14th-century, and over the next hundred years, chapels for wealthy families were added to the temple. The lateral windows have an organic rounded shape but the walls contain protruding pilasters that buttress the walls and facade; each pilaster ends in a spire. The interior columns have bicoloured horizontal striations. On the lateral walls of the choir, above the wooden stalls, are two large canvases depicting the Miracle of the Loaves and Fishes and a Resurrection of Lazarus by Guglielmo Caccia. The Chapel of the Rosary contains a canvas with the Virgin and Child and the Story of the Rosary also by il Moncalvo. The first chapel on the left houses copies of a Deposition by Gaudenzio Ferrari and of a painting by Guercino. The original of the latter is housed in the church of San Domenico, Turin.

The Dominican order still presides over the convent and church. A priest ordinated in this church, Giuseppe Girotti, died at Dachau on April 1, 1945, he was beatified at Alba in April 2014. A statue in his honor has been placed in the church.
