= Giacomo Segre =

Jewish-Italian army officer

- Born: March 7, 1839; Saluzzo
- Died: October 5, 1894; Chieri
- Allegiance: Kingdom of Sardinia; Kingdom of Italy
- Service / branch: (Kingdom of Italy) Royal Italian Army
- Rank: Captain
- Commands: 5th Artillery Battery, 9th Regiment
- Battles / wars: Capture of Rome; Third Italian War of Independence
- Children: Roberto Segre

Giacomo Segre (b. Saluzzo, March 7, 1839; d. Chieri, October 5, 1894) was a Jewish Italian military officer during the Risorgimento.

== Biography ==
On September 20, 1870, Captain Segre participated in the Capture of Rome.

=== Mythologized role ===
According to popular history, Pius IX had threatened to excommunicate whoever gave the order to open fire on the city. The threat did not deter the attack, however; the order did not come from Raffaele Cadorna but instead from Segre himself, as commander of the 5th battery of the 9th Regiment.

=== Factual record ===
The historical record differs from the legend. Segre was put in command not because he was Jewish and thus able to avoid excommunication; this is a myth — he was given his authority because of his military acumen and was noted for his battery's discipline and accuracy.

Segre did give a command to fire and contributed to the fall of Porta Pia, but his order was not the first. Rather, the artilleries of the 9th and 13th divisions opened fire at 5:15 am, and the 11th and 12th also attacked before Segre's reserves fired their first shots at 5:20 am. The totality of the bombardment eventually broke through Rome's fortifications, with Segre's commander Major Luigi Pelloux commending his precision and success.

=== Family ===
Giacomo's son Roberto (1872–1936) served in the Italian Army as well, eventually becoming a general.

== Legacy ==
Giacomo Segre's legacy is that of an important if unknown figure in the fight for Italian unification, particularly among the Jews of Italy. In 2021, the Jewish Museum of Rome opened an exhibit dedicated to the 150th anniversary of the role of Jewish soldiers in the breach of Porta Pia and the Capture of Rome.

== See also ==
- History of the Jews in Italy
- History of the Jews in Sardinia
- Italian nationalism
- Italkim
- Jewish military history
