= Sanctuary of the Santissima Annunziata, Chieri =

Roman Catholic church in Chieri, Italy

Coordinates: 45°00′43″N 7°49′14″E

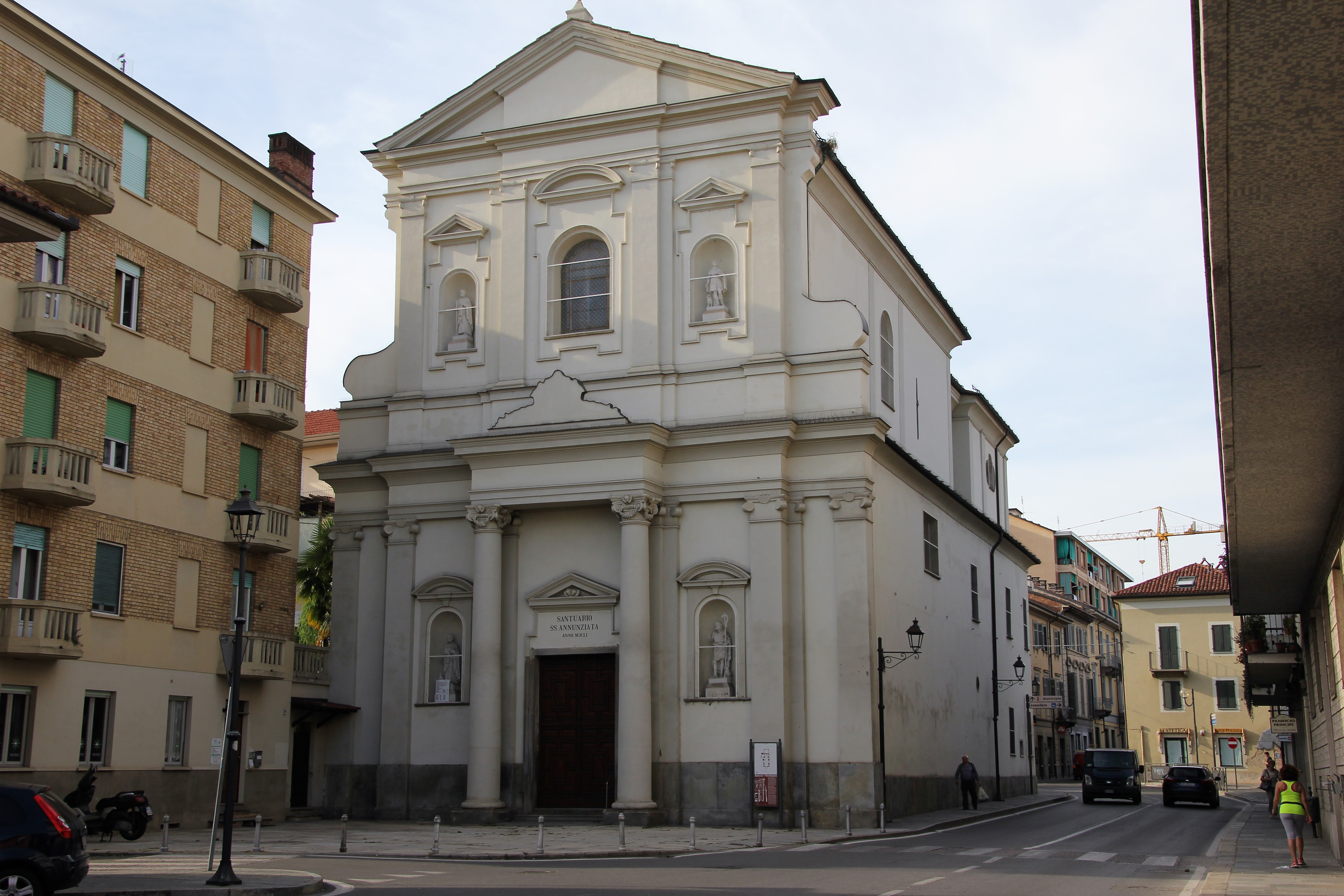

The Sanctuary of the Santissima Annunziata is a Baroque-style, Roman Catholic church located in the town of Chieri, in the Metropolitan City of Turin, region of Piedmont, Italy.

== History ==
The church was commissioned in 1650 by Duchess Maria Cristina of France from the architect Andrea Costaguta. It was built at the site of a prior small chapel, where tradition holds, a mute was miraculously restored to the ability to speak after praying to a frescoed Madonna. This fresco is now found inside the church. In the chapel to the left is a copy of the painting of St Michael by Guido Reni, in the chapel on the right is an Adoration by the Magi by Giovanni Claret.
