= Francesco Fea =

Italian painter (1607–1652)

Francesco Fea (active 1607 – circa 1652) was an Italian painter active in a Mannerist style, who painted in Piedmont.

== Biography ==
He was born in Chieri. He was the grandfather of the painters Giovan Francesco and Antonio Cerutti Fea, born to his daughter and the son of the painter Gasparo Cerutti. He was employed in the decoration of the grand gallery of Palazzo Madama, Turin. He collaborated in projects with Guglielmo Caccia (who was likely his mentor) and Federico Zuccari. He painted mainly in the Piedmont.

He painted a Resurrection of Christ for the Duomo of Chieri, and for San Guglielmo in the same town, he painted an Adoration of the Magi.
