= Giorgio Alberino =

Italian painter

Giorgio Alberino (1575/6 – 1625/6) was an Italian painter who was active in Casale Monferrato in the early 17th century. His paintings notably depicted sacred subjects.

== Biography ==
Alberino was born in Alessandria, Piedmont. He is cited by Luigi Lanzi as training with Guglielmo Caccia (il Moncalvo), where he cites Della Valle, that Alberino was a fellow student with a painter named N or M Sacchi (il Sacchi di Casale). However, in the entry for the Encyclopedia Treccani, he is identified as likely a collaborator of Moncalvo, who had trained likely in Vercelli, where he married the daughter of the painter Amedeo Giovenone. He worked with Moncalvo in the Gallery of the Royal Palace of Turin in 1607. He also painted for several chapels in the Sacro Monte di Crea. In 1630, he signed an altarpiece, along with his grandson Pietro Paolo Boffa, for the parish of Felizzano.

Among other works are a Mysteries of the Rosary in a chapel of San Domenico and frescoes depicting Apostles on the walls of San Pietro, both in Casale Monferatto.
