= Abbey of Fruttuaria =

Coordinates: 45.2221°N 7.7813°E

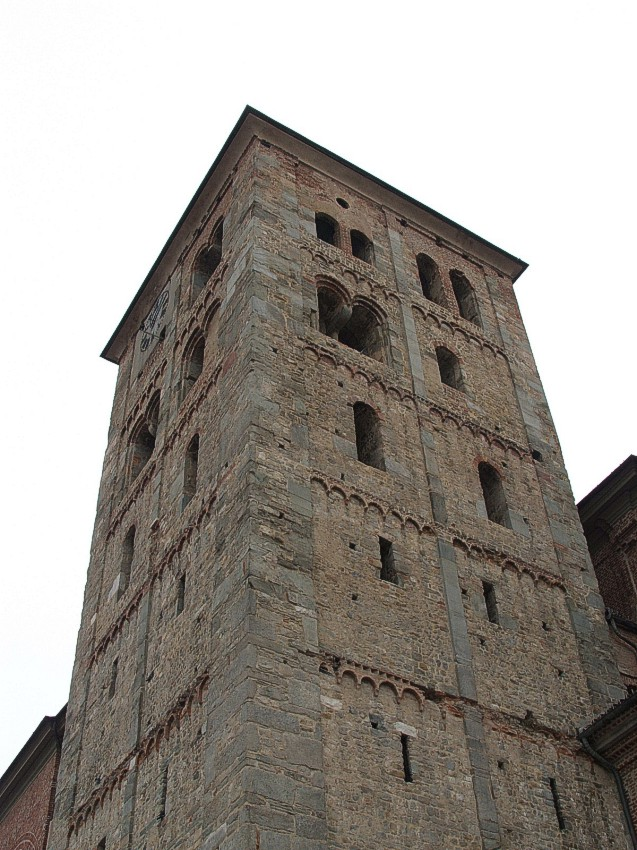
Bell tower of the abbey.

Fruttuaria is an abbey in the territory of San Benigno Canavese, about twenty kilometers north of Turin, northern Italy.

== History ==
The foundation of the abbey was patronized by Guglielmo da Volpiano, who donated the land, allowing for the first stone of a large Romanesque-style church to be laid on 23 February 1003. It was consecrated by Ottobiano, bishop of Ivrea, in the presence of Arduin, marchese d'Ivrea and King of Italy, and his consort Berta. The monastery was completed in 1006-1007 and followed the Benedictine rule as reformed at Cluny. There Arduin retired there and died in December 1015. In 1027 a bull of Pope John XIX placed the abbey and all its lands under direct papal supervision. Empress Agnes was a patron of Fruttuaria, and retired there in 1065 before moving to Rome. She was instrumental in introducing Fruttuaria's Benedictine customs, as practiced at Cluny, to Saint Blaise Abbey in Baden-Württemberg.

The greatest splendor of the abbey of Fruttuaria was in the 12th and 13th centuries when it minted its own coin. In 1265 the abbey possessed eighty-five churches in Italy alone, as well as four comuni, the quattro terre abbaziali of San Benigno Canavese, Montanaro, Lombardore and Foglizzo. Other possessions were located in France and Austria. Some 1,200 monks inhabited the monastery.

In the 14th century, decline set in, culminating in 1477 when the monks lost their privilege of naming the abbot. Nominating an absentee abbot in commendam and a vicar to represent him at the site was thenceforth a papal perquisite. In 1585 Pope Sixtus V suppressed the monastery, substituting in its buildings a college of secular priests. The last monk died in 1634.

In 1710 troops of Victor Amadeus II, Duke of Savoy, occupied the terre abbaziali, an occupation that lasted until 1741 and only ended with papal renunciation of all territorial control.

In 1749, a new abbot in commendam, Carlo Vittorio Amedeo delle Lanze took over Fruttuaria. In 1770 razed the remains of the Romanesque church and monastery, save the campanile and parts of the apse structure, and erected a new and present church in their stead in a late-baroque classicizing design initially by Bernardo Antonio Vittone and completed by Mario Quarini. The original church had three naves and a large transept with multiple chapels in the apse. In 1979, work related to installing heating brought to light an 11th-century mosaic representing two griffons with plant decorations. Excavations have revealed the foundations of the Romanesque church. Restorations were concluded in May 2004.

The present church has a classic temple-like facade with a triangular tympanum supported by large Corinthian columns

== Sources ==
- Viola, Luciano (1981). L'Abbazia di Fruttuaria e il Comune di San Benigno Canavese. Ivrea.
