= Orsola Maddalena Caccia =

Italian artist (1596–1676)

Maddalena Caccia
- Born: Theodora Caccia; Moncalvo, Italy
- Baptised: December 4, 1596
- Died: c. 1676; Moncalvo, Italy
- Education: Guglielmo Caccia (father)
- Known for: Painting
- Notable work: Birth of the Virgin, Still Life with Flowers, Fruit, Mushroom, Goldfinch, and Hoopoe, St. Luke the Evangelist in the Studio
- Movement: Mannerism

Orsola Maddalena Caccia, born Theodora Caccia (1596–1676) was an Italian mannerist painter and Catholic nun. She painted religious images, altarpieces, and still lifes.

== Biography ==
The daughter of painter Guglielmo Caccia and Laura Olivia, she was baptized Theodora Orsola on December 4, 1596. In 1620, she entered the Ursulines convent at Bianzè, where she changed her name to Orsola Maddalena after she took her vows. Four of her sisters had already taken their vows there and two years later, her other sister joined the same convent. At the time, Bianzé was a fortified outpost on the frontier between the lands of the Gonzaga, the dukes of Mantua and Monferrato, and the duchy of Savoy and was often in the path of warring armies. To find a safer home for his daughters, Guglielmo requested and received permission to found the Ursuline convent at Moncalvo. He used his own money and made the houses he owned available to pay for this project. In 1625, Orsola and her sisters moved to the newly founded convent. Her father died a few months after the convent was established and left drawings, set squares and other art tools for his daughters. Before his death, he had fostered painting as a vocation for the Ursulines of Moncalvo. Out of his six daughters and two sons, Orsola and her sister Francesca, who died at a young age, were his only two children to become painters. She was known as a leader of women in religious painting. Without her, nuns would not have been able to explore their artistic side. Later in her life, Orsola became the abbess of the convent. She outlived all of her sisters and devoted herself to painting until her death in 1676.

== Career ==
Sister Orsola began her career working as her father's assistant. She learned to paint by mixing the colored pigments for paint and depicting the secondary figures in her father's paintings. She was a prolific artist and the majority of her works are scattered across the many small localities in Monferrat. It is claimed that she painted the first recorded flower painting in Italy.

She went on to organize a painting studio within the convent at Moncalvo, where took on students and assistants of her own. Painting as a trade was encouraged at the convent as it provided a means of support. Several of Sister Orsola pieces were painted on commission. Not only did she commission her works, which she did privately and publicly but she paved the way for nuns to become artists. In two letters addressed to Christine of France written in 1643, she asked to be given an opportunity for paid work as her convent was suffering from poverty.

She helped bring still life painting to Northwestern Italy. The idea of extremely detailed religious art was also because of Orsola. She brought people to realize that scenes of the Bible were very important to the story. She also started to use symbolism in her paintings, such as roses meaning virgin and Ox meaning Jesus’s death.

== Works ==
Sister Orsola created religious genre paintings, altarpieces, and still lifes which varied little over the course of the fifty years she painted. Most of her works convey the repertoire of figurative models and types of composition that she studied in her father's studio during her adolescence. In comparison to her many altarpieces and religious paintings, Sister Orsola created few still life works. She commonly inserted pieces of still life in many of her religious works. These elements of still life are a reflection of the types of objects she had access to in the convent and could study from. Many of her still lifes are considered unusual and notable in their invention and stylistic quality. Each element of her still lifes is meticulously placed and balanced by other figures in the composition. She also depicted various species of flowers and other plants in her works. Orsola's paintings are recognizable as her creations since they are filled with spirituality and are lifelike in their precision. As the years go on, more of her works continue to be discovered and are correctly attributed to her after initial mislabeling.

=== Major works ===
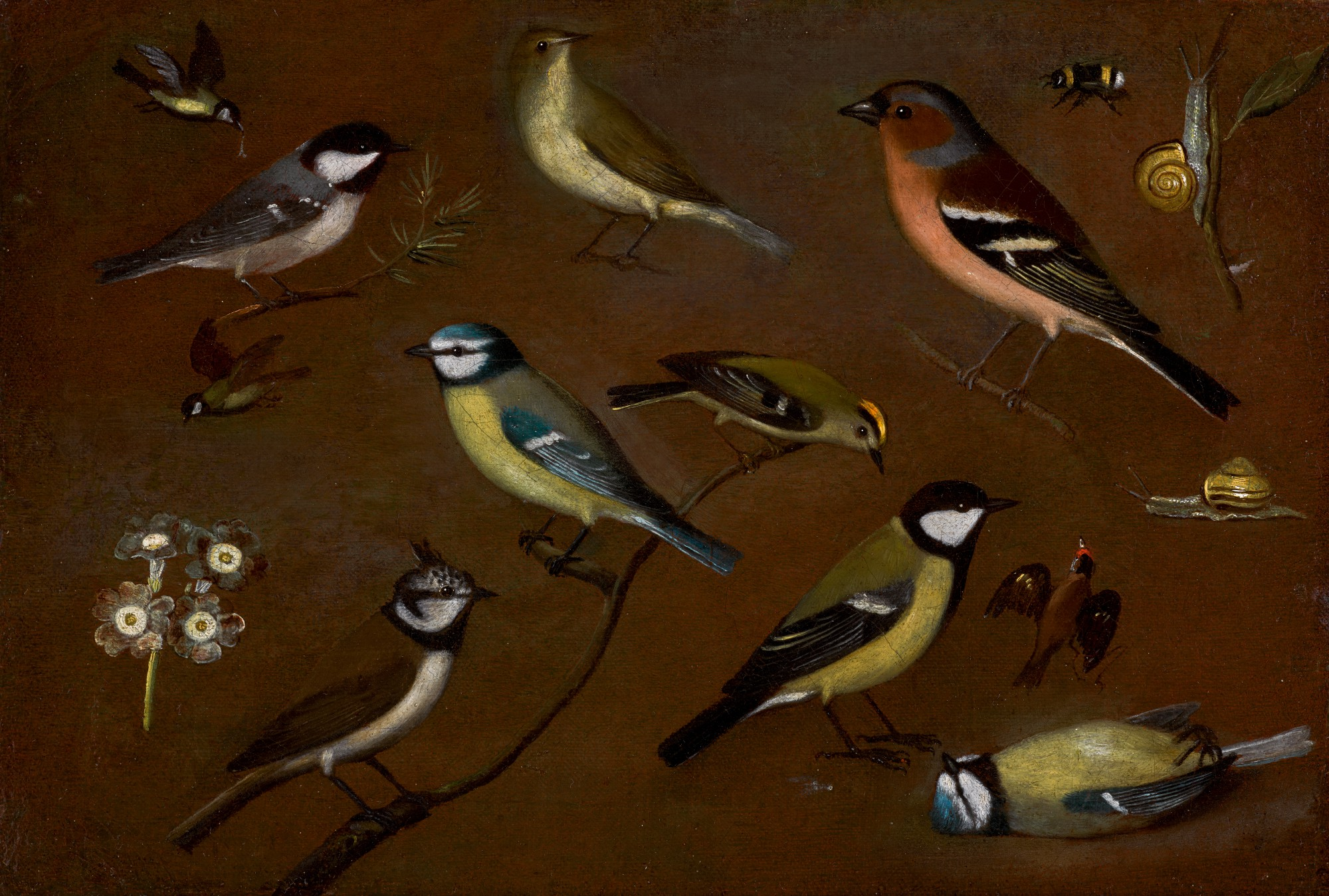
Still Life of Birds...

Sister Orsola's Birth of the Virgin was most likely created around 1635. The original provenance of this image is unknown, making it hard to establish exact year it was created. Originally, it was attributed to her father, then reassigned to the family workshop, and finally identified as one of Orsola's works. In 1838, it entered the Pinacoteca do Estado de São Paulo at the request from Marchese Luigi Malaspina. It is often regarded as one of her best known works. It depicts the sacred tale of the Virgin Mary's birth with a wealth of details. Three women look after Mary's mother Anne who is lying on her bed after labor while three others prepare to wash the newborn child and heat pieces of cloth at a fire. Various still life elements are inserted into this scene which are notable for their precision and quality. For example, a table on the left side of the image has an elaborate, coiled amphora and a tray of fruit with a cut lemon. Also, a young woman who is advancing towards Anne's bed holds a jug of wine and a drinking glass on a round dish. The drapes of the background, the velvet canopy over Anne's bed, the fringe of the tablecloths and blankets, and the lace on the bed sheets are depicted with intense accuracy. This painting has been associated with two drawings by her father as the sources of her inspiration.

Another famous work by Orsola is her Still Life with Flowers, Fruit, Mushroom, Goldfinch, and Hoopoe. Since Orsola created still lifes over a long period of time, it is difficult to assign an exact date for when this image was created. Since it is made with a palette of bright colors, the paint is laid on the panel more thickly, and resembles a work she created late in her career, it has generally been accepted that this work was made in between 1645 and 1650. This work was originally attributed to Sister Orsola by the Italian art historian Mina Gregori. The atypical horizontal format of the painting suggests that it was meant to be set above a door, inserted in a wooden paneling of a wall, or to adorn a cabinet in a sacristy. The objects seem to be laid out on a windowsill set in a wall of a room that opens out onto a view of the sky which is flecked with gray clouds. The image stands out for its depiction of unusual species of plants and animals and its rhythmic composition which is formed around the alternations of color. The uncommon animals and plants in the image are the hibiscus, the Turk's-cap lily, the hoopoe, and the mushroom. The lifelike representation of the plant forms have led to the belief that Orsola used scientific prints and treatises to learn how to depict plant life realistically. The birds symbolize facets of Christianity since the goldfinch is a reference to the Passion of the Christ while the hoopoe is a symbol for sin. She also faithfully reproduces a large mushroom of the woodland clavaria species with its white, fleshy stem and yellow-ochre clustered branches. This mushroom alludes to life regenerated after death through fermentation or organic decomposition. Therefore, the mushroom is the third element in a symbolic triangle placed in the center of the composition between the two birds, which together symbolize sin, sacrifice, and resurrection.

One of the other more well-known art pieces was St. Luke the Evangelist in the Studio, which showed St. Luke in his studio, painting the Virgin Mary and baby Jesus. It is a busy scene showing St. Luke not just as a painter but also a sculptor; this being a reference to the tradition of Luke having produced a 'visual representation' of Mary's life.. The bookshelf behind him shows an ox and angels to represent aspects of Luke's supposed character and his writings, and the flowers by Mary and the portrait of a town represent her 'origin and virtue'.

In May 2020, Still life of Birds... was auctioned by Sotheby's, with an estimate of US$12,000-18,000, selling for $260,000, beating the artist's previous auction record of £28,145 for Vases of Flowers on a Table at Dorotheum, Vienna, in 2016.

In 2020, three works were bequeathed by Errol Rudman to The Metropolitan Museum of Art, making the museum the largest repository of her works outside of Moncalvo.

== Gallery ==
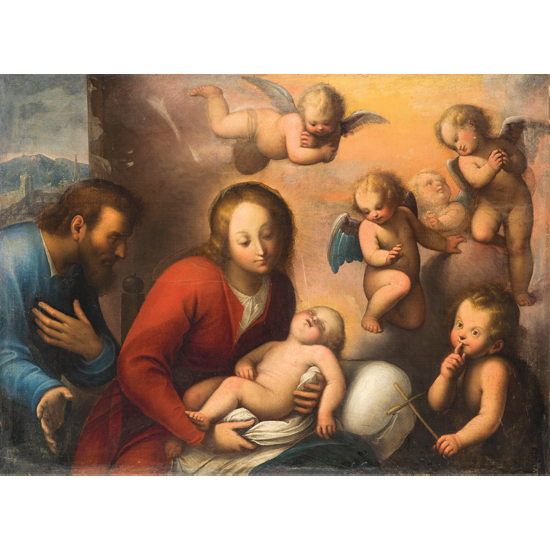
Natività (ca. 1621-1625)

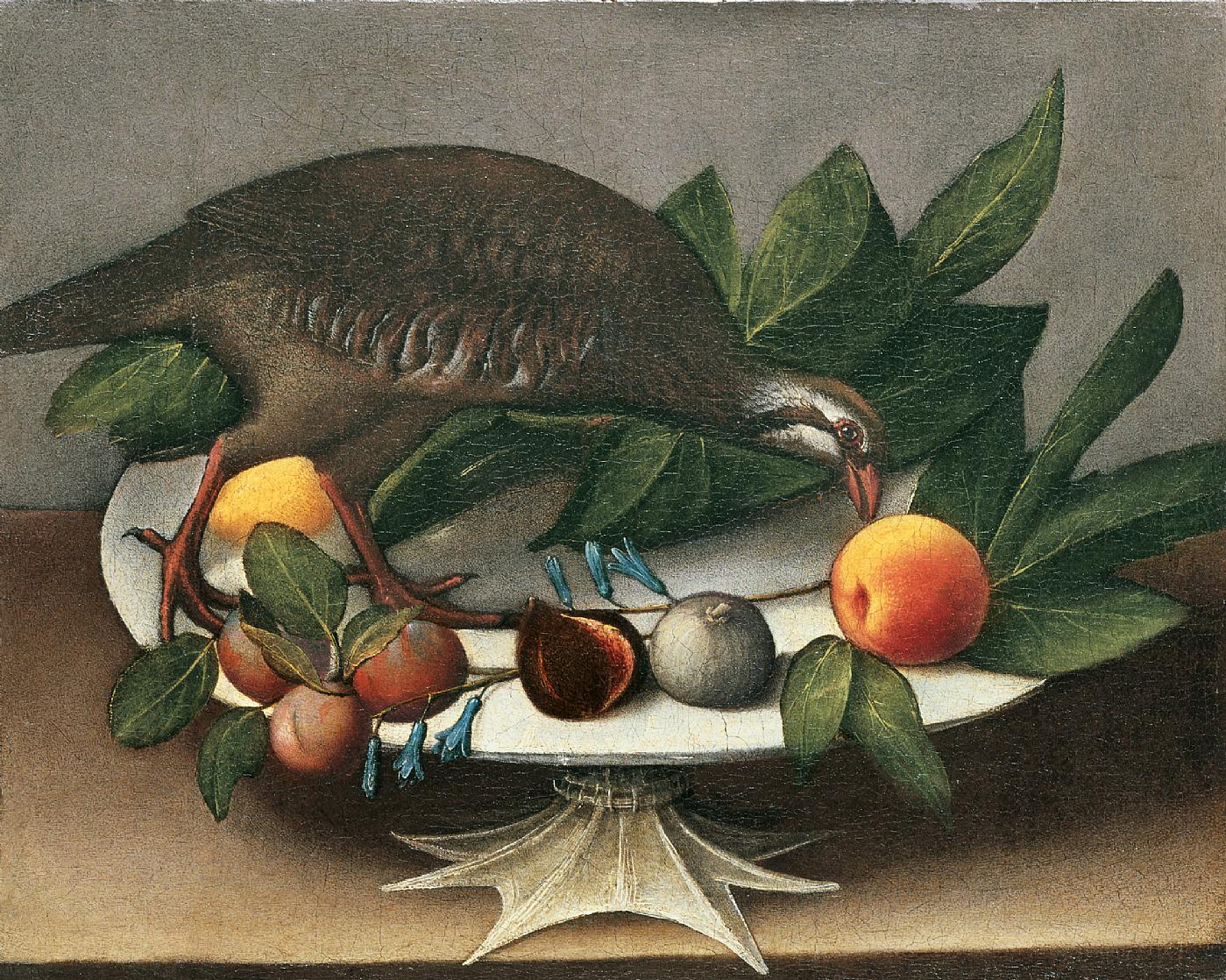
Fruit still life with a partridge
