= Chieri =

Chieri Cher (Piedmontese)
- Comune
- Comune di Chieri
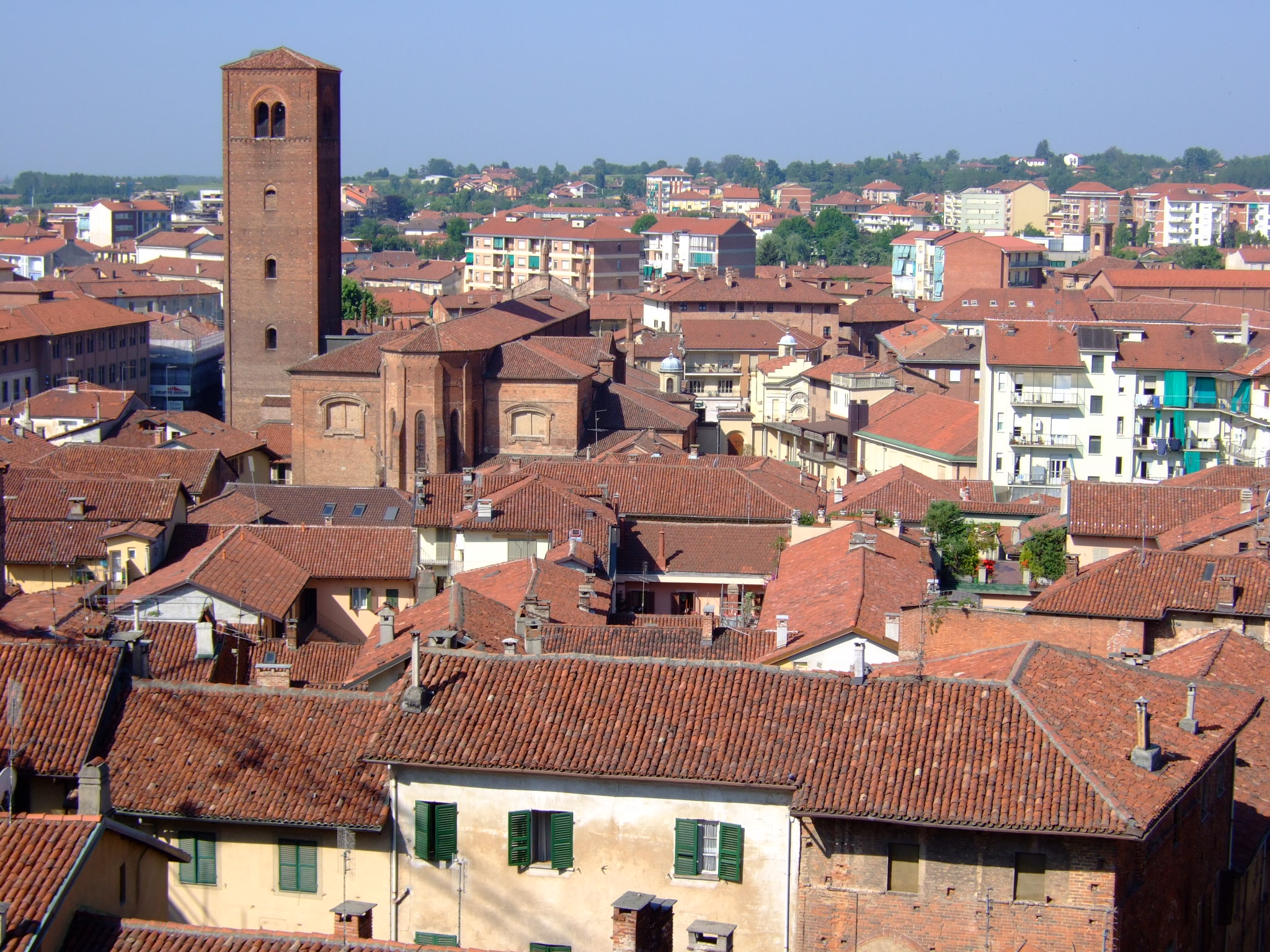
- Panorama of Chieri

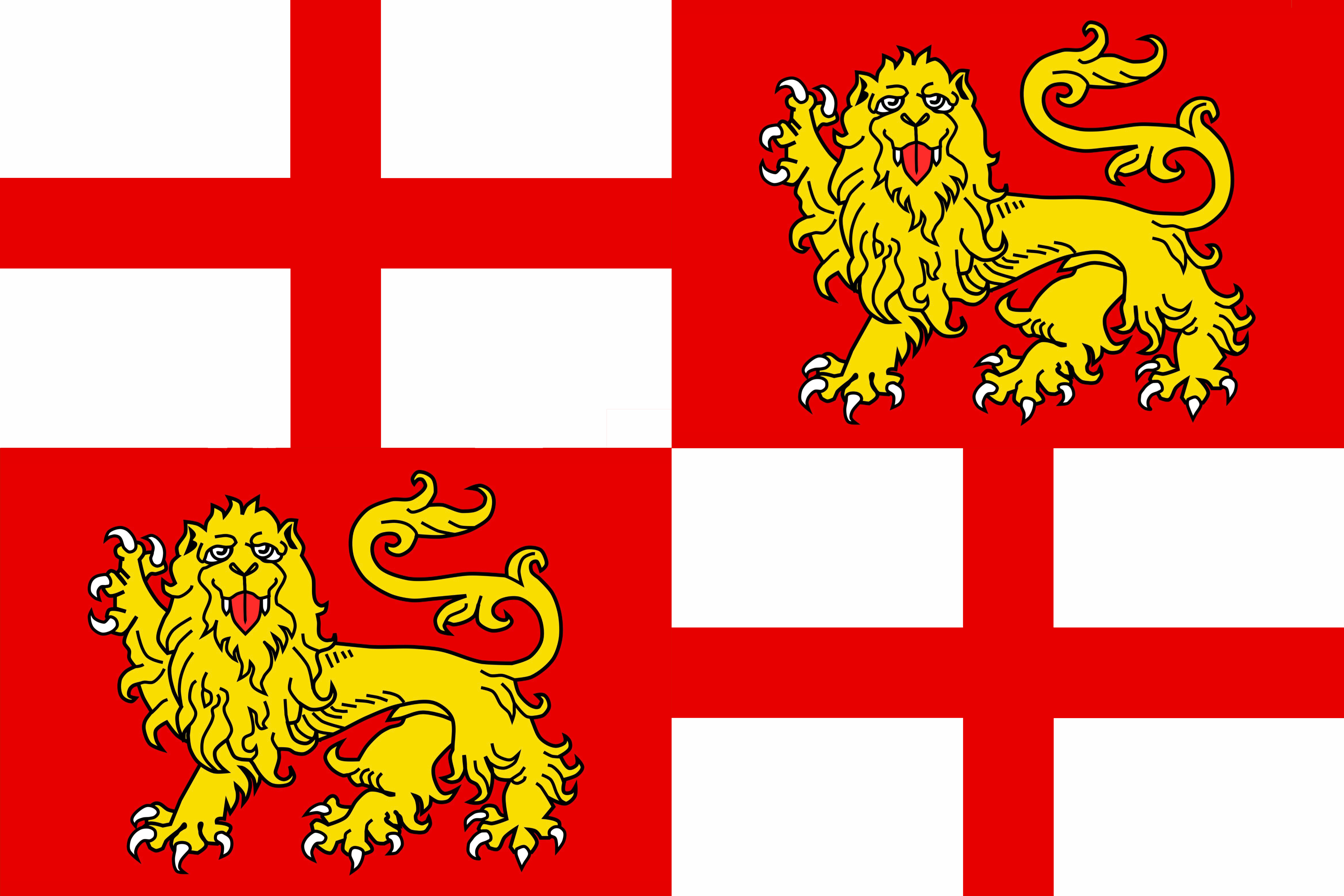
- Flag Coat of arms

- Location within Italy Location within Piedmont
- Coordinates: 45°00′45″N 07°49′30″E
- Country: Italy
- Region: Piedmont
- Metropolitan city: Turin (TO)
- Frazioni: Pessione, Madonna della Scala

Government
  - Mayor: Alessandro Sicchiero

Area
  - Total: 54.3 km^{2} (21.0 sq mi)
- Elevation: 305 m (1,001 ft)

Population (30 June 2017)
  - Total: 36,749
  - Density: 677/km^{2} (1,750/sq mi)
- Demonym: Chieresi
- Time zone: UTC+1 (CET)
  - Summer (DST): UTC+2 (CEST)
- Postal code: 10023
- Dialing code: 011
- Patron saint: Santa Maria delle Grazie
- Saint day: September 12
- Website: Official website

Chieri (Italian: [ˈkjɛːri]; Piedmontese: Cher) is a town and comune in the Metropolitan City of Turin, Piedmont (Italy), located about 11 kilometres (7 miles) southeast of Turin, 15 km (9 mi) by rail and 13 km (8 mi) by road. It borders the following municipalities: Baldissero Torinese, Pavarolo, Montaldo Torinese, Pino Torinese, Arignano, Andezeno, Pecetto Torinese, Riva presso Chieri, Cambiano, Santena, and Poirino.

== History ==
=== Pre-Roman ===
Between the Neolithic and the Iron Age, the original inhabitants of this part of the Italian peninsula were the Ligures. The Ligures living in this area of the Po river plain belonged specifically to the Taurini tribe.

The location of Chieri is within the Taurini tribe's territory, in the belt of hills which surround Turin. The original settlement was most likely founded by them, being sited on a prominent hill (on which the church of San Giorgio currently stands) and growing to be the geographical focus of the city centre. Its original name would have been Karreum or a variant thereof (e.g. Karreo/Karrea/Carrea); this is based on the root kar, which possibly means "stone", reflecting the typical Ligurian settlement layout of a stone edifice at the centre of a grouping of other habitations within a village, which would have likely been the original layout of Chieri.

Sometime around 400 BCE, Celtic tribes crossed the Alps from Gaul and settled the Po river plain. These peoples mingled with the original Ligures, either through conquest or peaceful cohabitation, and gave rise to a Celto-Ligurian people, inhabiting the region which the Romans would call Cisalpine Gaul, i.e. "Gaul this side of the Alps".

=== Roman ===
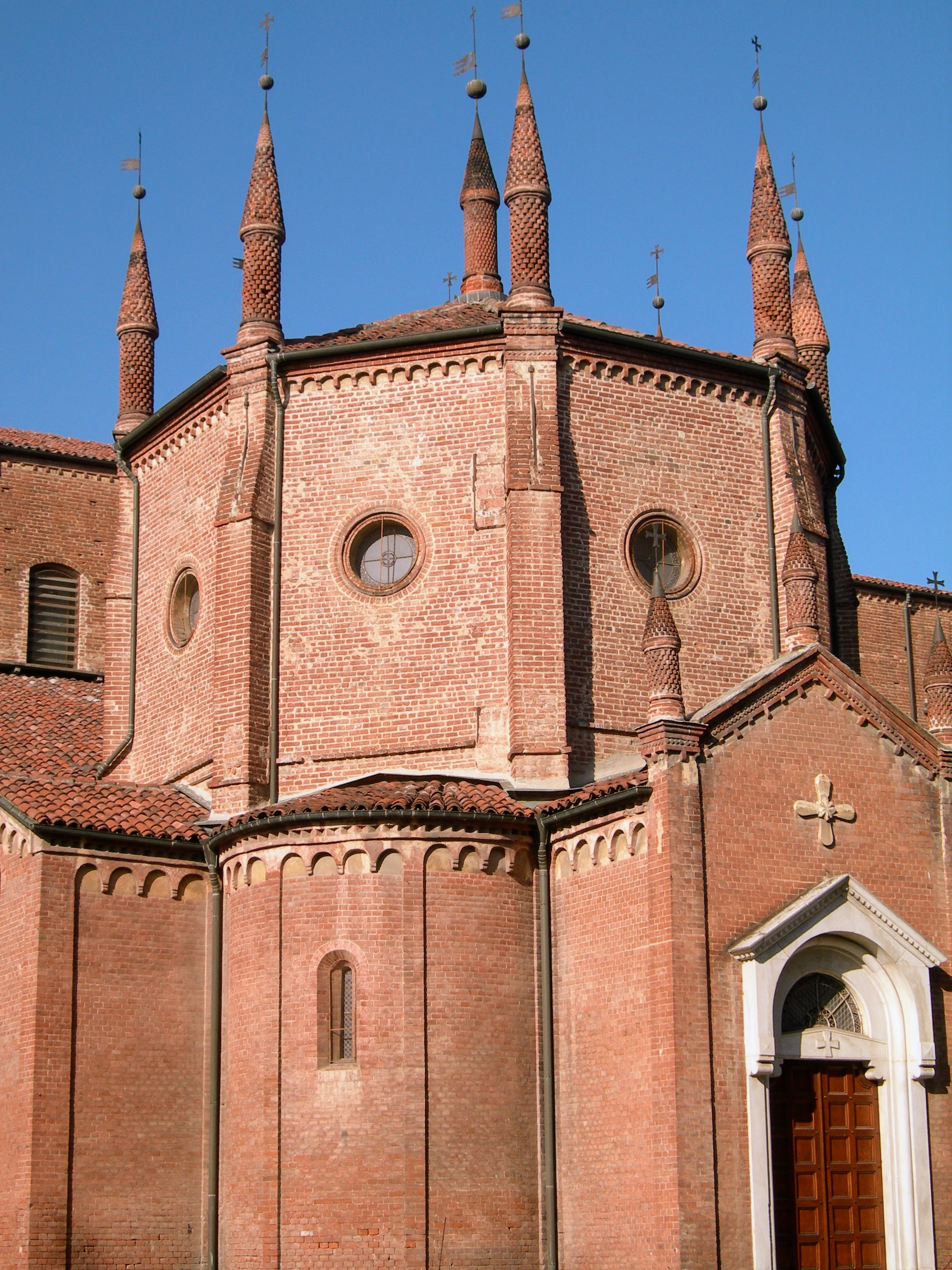
Baptistry of the Duomo of Chieri, built upon the remains of part of the Roman temple to Minerva

The Romans, over the two centuries between 400 and 200 BCE, conducted a prolonged counter-offensive to conquer all of the northern Italian peninsula, partially in response to successive invasions, starting with Gauls led by king Brennus in 391 BCE, and later the Carthaginians under the great general Hannibal Barca in 218 BCE.

It is likely sometime after 176 BCE that Cisalpine Gaul was completely subdued by Roman legions, and this would have included the village of Karreum itself. This was possibly under the command of Roman consul Caius Claudius Pulcrus, leading a military response to a rebellion the year before by the Ligures.

Following this Roman conquest in the 2nd Century BCE, the village became known as the Roman settlement of Carreum Potentia: the Latin name Potentia (derived from potens, "powerful") being added as a cognomen to the original Ligurian name.

It is likely that, following similar examples elsewhere, at Carreum Potentia the Roman settlement was built alongside the pre-Roman one, the Roman part built on lower ground in the plain, alongside the Rio Tepice stream and at the base of the original native hill-top settlement. It would appear the Forum and the main Temple (most likely dedicated to the goddess Minerva) were located in the area where the cathedral and the piazza around it currently stand, with a wall around it (traces of which were excavated in the 1960s).

Roman historian Pliny the Elder referenced "Carreum quod Potentia cognominatur", in his Naturalis Historia (dated 50-60 AD), naming it within a list of fortified settlements which then abounded in the section of Cisalpine Gaul between the River Po and the Ligurian Apennines: the city was portrayed as a prosperous Roman walled city, surrounded by cultivated farmlands and scattered agricultural settlements. By the 1st Century AD, Carreum Potentia was indeed referred to as a Roman municipium, i.e. a seat of local government for the surrounding area.

The city underwent conversion to Christianity sometime between the 4th and 5th century, as recorded on a funeral slab dated from June 488 AD for a little girl called Genesia who died at the age of two.

According to Marguerite de Lussan, biographer of Louis Balbe-Bertone de Crillon, the city of Chieri was given a republican form of government by a Balbus, member of a patrician Roman family, who relocated to the city in the late sixth century. No evidence of this statement is provided, although Chieri would emerge in the Middle Ages as a republic striving for independence from its feudal liege lords.

=== Early Middle Ages ===
No further historical records exist regarding Chieri until the 10th century, when it was officially granted as a fief to the Bishop of Turin by an Imperial grant of Otto III, although it was also subject to the military authority of the larger march of Italy, whose holder at the time was the titular Count of the House of Savoy through his marriage to Adelaide of Susa.

Following the death of Adelaide of Susa, Marchioness of Turin, many of the Piedmontese holdings of the counts of Savoy were lost by her heir Humbert II. In the political fragmentation which followed, the Piedmontese lands east of Turin were divided into the counties of Saluzzo, Biandrate and the March of Montferrat, which eventually allowed the cities of Chieri and Asti to flourish economically and declare independence from their respective liege bishops as free cities, supported by the House of Savoy who were interested in diminishing the power of the local feudal lords.

The process of obtaining independence was gradual and prudent and started with various administrative and tax reforms to provide the city's government with resources and offices of government of Roman stamp, consuls, as well as with the strengthening of the city's fortifications. In this gradual manner, the city of Chieri started to expand its influence to the neighbouring territories.

By the first half of the 11th century, the city had an encircling defensive wall erected around the San Giorgio Hill (known as the Castrum Sancti Georgi, which still constitutes the city nucleus), under the direction of Bishop Landulf: these long-demolished Mura Landolfiane still clearly trace the outline of the pattern of narrow streets around the hill (known as the Chiocciola, "snail"). The work included a strengthening of the fortifications and tower atop the hill, now incorporated into the Church of San Giorgio which occupies the hilltop and overlooks the city.

Outside the walls, on the plains surrounding the city, a church was erected dedicated to the Virgin Mary: this site was likely that of an earlier and more primitive Church dating from the 4th century, which had itself replaced the earlier Roman Temple to the goddess Minerva.

This period also experienced the construction of numerous quadrilateral towers inside the perimeter of the walls by the powerful families of the city, hence it became known as Città delle Cento Torri ("city of one hundred towers"): a handful of these towers still survive to this day.

In 1154, the city allied itself with the more powerful city of Asti in fighting against William V of Montferrat, defeating him in battle. At the first Diet of Roncaglia, Emperor Frederick Barbarossa who had descended upon Italy with his army to restore his sovereignty, granted William V of Montferrat, who had married a niece of the Emperor, rights over the two cities. With his army following the river Po, the Emperor was determined to lay siege to both cities. The citizen of Chieri, knowing that the city would be no match for a siege by the Imperial Army, fled the city carefully leaving behind copious amounts of wine and food for the invaders, who nonetheless proceeded to demolish its towers and ruin its fortifications, ultimately setting the city on fire in January 1155, before moving on to Asti, where they would repeat the deed.

Popular legend has it that the present-day name of the city was given by Barbarossa, who, upon departing the city after ransacking it, looked back upon its ruins and asked Ma tu, chi eri? (Italian for "And you, who were you?"), although this story is most likely apocryphal.

In 1158, the Emperor returned to Italy to deal with the continued insurgence of the cities of northern Italy, which were growing politically bolder and economically more prosperous. Although this time Chieri sided with the Emperor and immediately contributed to his army, it was terribly compensated, for it was newly given as a feud to the Bishop of Turin who in turn gave it to the powerful Guido III, Count of Biandrate, possibly fearing that alone he may not have sufficient power to hold it.

In 1169, Chieri and Asti signed a defensive treaty of mutual aid to defend themselves from the ambitions of the Counts of Biandrate and found themselves shortly after victorious in a war against them, restoring some of their rights and furthering their path towards independence.

In 1176, the Emperor was defeated by the Lombard League at the battle of Legnano and personally injured. The Balbo family from the city of Chieri participated in the battle fighting in the Guelph side, against the Emperor.

At the end of the century, the city allied with Testona to declare war on its ecclesiastical liege lord the Bishop of Turin, Arduino Valperga. The town of Turin, the counts of Biandrate, and the lords of Cavoretto and Revigliasco joined on the side of the Bishop, while the lords of Cavorre and Piossasco joined on the side of the republic of Chieri. The republic of Asti, which was bound to Chieri by similar ambitions and fate, and by a military pact of 1194, came to the aid of Chieri. Although first hand recollections of the war are unavailable, it is assumed by the following peace that the war was favorable to Chieri. The peace was signed in the fields of Mairano, near Testona, on 10 February 1200 in the presence of ambassadors of Asti and Vercelli, the Bishop Arduino, the Podestà of Turin, Chieri and Testona, and numerous prominent citizens of the city, including two Pulluolii, Uberto di Bencia, two Merli, Pier Gribaldo, Signorino Balbo and Enerico Tana. The peace had several clauses, of which the most important was likely a clause stating that the two republics of Testona and Chieri would aid the Count of Savoy were he to exercise his rights over the city of Turin and the Bishop, in recognition that he was the heir of their former sovereigns and out of mutual enmity with Turin.

A treaty of 4 March 1204 bound Chieri, Testona and Turin. On top of the defensive and mutual aid clauses, others were made to establish that each of the cities would enjoy the same municipal privileges of the others, and that they would share the same podestà. Many provisions were made in regards to the bridge of Testona (today at Moncalieri), which was of vital economical importance to all three cities, including its tolls, the roads leading to it and the guards to be provided. Although ambitious in nature, the treaty was soon put aside, with a new Bishop of Turin requesting that many of his privileges be restored. This included being beneficiary of all fines for homicide, theft, treason and for duels, as well as of those foreigners who died without will and those of Chieri with no will and no relatives up to the fourth grade. This was ratified in a treaty in 1210.

On 10 June of the same year, the city signed a treaty with Goffredo, Count of Biandrate, and his nephews for mutual defense against all enemies save for the Emperor and the Bishop. The treaty forbade the Count to give citizenship to any man of the city of Chieri, and vice versa for Chieri to offer citizenship to any of his subjects. The clause is characteristic of the regulation of growth in the medieval period, where the founding of a city required imperial dispensation, fortifications were to be approved by liege lords, and the movement of people was an enormous loss of capital for the feudal system, although one that would prove irreversible as urban areas grew larger and more powerful over the coming centuries.

Many of the privileges earned were to be confirmed by Otto IV, to whom a richer Chieri sent the ambassador Iacopo de Rohat, their podestà, and many others. Privileges he granted the city included the faculty of receiving new citizens as well as confirmed sovereignty over smaller territories nearby.

In 1123 and 1224, respectively, Riva and Coazze were annexed by Chieri. The inhabitants of the latter were moved closer to Chieri with its help to the lands of Pecetto.

Greatly responsible for the prosperity of Chieri at this time was Ugone del Carretto, podestà of Chieri and in 1225 of Asti. He was also instrumental for the purchase by the city of the Castle of Revigliasco and its surrounding lands.

Finally, the commercial disputes over the merchant root from Genova and Lombardy which went through Asti and Chieri, which took Italian merchants to France, resulted in a new war by Chieri and Asti against Testona. In 1228, the troops of the two allied cities razed Testona to the ground, not sparing even its churches. In the following years, the dispersed inhabitants resettled in the nearby locality of Moncalieri.

=== Late Middle Ages ===
In the course of the 13th century, the Republic of Chieri experienced a period of substantial prosperity, and at that time was comparable in splendor and importance to other Italian city-states such as Genoa, Asti and Pisa.

In 1238, the Republic was granted the status of camera speciale (Italian: "special chamber") by Emperor Frederick II, which meant that the only authority the Republic would be subject to was that of the (very remote) emperor.

Following growing violent internecine struggles between city factions to the end of that century, the Republic of Chieri, despite asserting its dominion over adjacent lands and castles and constructing a secondary ring of city walls, decreased in power and autonomy to the point that in 1339 the city made itself subject to Robert of Anjou, King of Naples; in doing so, it granted half of its lands and territories as feudal possession to Prince Iacopo of the house of Savoy-Acaia. The city eventually passed in its entirety to the House of Savoy, when the line of Acaia died out.

=== Renaissance era ===
The 15th century brought Chieri a period of economic prosperity and a flourishing of the arts with, among other endeavours, the rebuilding of the Church of Santa Maria into its present form as the Duomo. During this time the hill-top church of San Giorgio was also rebuilt into its current incarnation, and several works of Flemish art were brought into the area by rich city merchants.

The 16th century covered a period of succeeding plagues, epidemics, and wars, and from 1551 to 1562 also brought French domination. During this period, some of its citizens became followers of the Protestant Reformation started by Martin Luther, but this was quashed by strong opposition from Duke Emmanuel Philibert: it was in order to honour him, along with Charles Emmanuel I of Savoy, that the city towards the end of this century constructed a triumphal arch, still present on the main street (currently Via Vittorio Emanuele II).

The year 1630 saw a terrible outbreak of the Bubonic Plague, which is still commemorated every 12 September with the ceremony of the Madonna delle Grazie. Despite this, the remainder of the 17th century experienced a flourishing of artistic achievement, with the building of several churches and chapels in Baroque style such as Sant'Antonio Abate at Chieri, as well as numerous paintings and sculptures.

=== Modern era ===
In 1785 Chieri became a Principality under the control of the Duke of Aosta. The late 18th century again brought French domination, this time under the conquests of Napoleon Bonaparte, but this period also witnessed the establishment of a major textile mill, which consolidated and built upon the city's base as a medieval centre for textile trade and manufacture.

Numerous other textile factories followed in the late 19th century, with textile manufacture originating from Chieri playing a prominent role even in international textile fairs. The year 1850 saw the demolition of the old medieval city gates and the privatisation of the city walls, which at that time still demarcated the limits of the entire city.

In 1871, a railroad link was constructed to the city in the form of the Chieri-Trofarello branch line, partly due to contributions from the municipality and from wealthy citizens. This was to serve the now very significant textile industry of the city, with the building of the railway station also serving to initiate in the surrounding area the erection of the first city quarter built outside its walls.

The early 20th century brought the electrification of the textile industries (1909). World War II caused no direct bombardments to the city despite the relocation of numerous factories and heavy industry manufacture from the nearby major industrial centre of Turin. Germany occupied the city following the 1943 Armistice of Cassibile until its liberation by Allied forces.

=== Today ===
The post-war period experienced a huge increase in Chieri's population, as massive migration occurred between the 1950s and 1970s from the Veneto region and from Southern Italy to the major industrial centres of Northern Italy such as Milan and Turin and adjacent areas. This resulted in a population boom from approximately 14,000 immediately after the war to 30,000 inhabitants in just under three decades.

The later years of the 20th century also witnessed the decline of textile industry in the city, as numerous factories were forced to close from competitive pressure from the cheaper manufacturing centres of the Indian subcontinent and the Far East. This is being counteracted by the establishment of a new industrial area outside the city, and also by a rediscovering and redeveloping of Chieri's significant cultural and historical heritage.

Currently, Chieri has developed into an increasingly important hub offering a wide range of business and tertiary services.

== Main sights ==
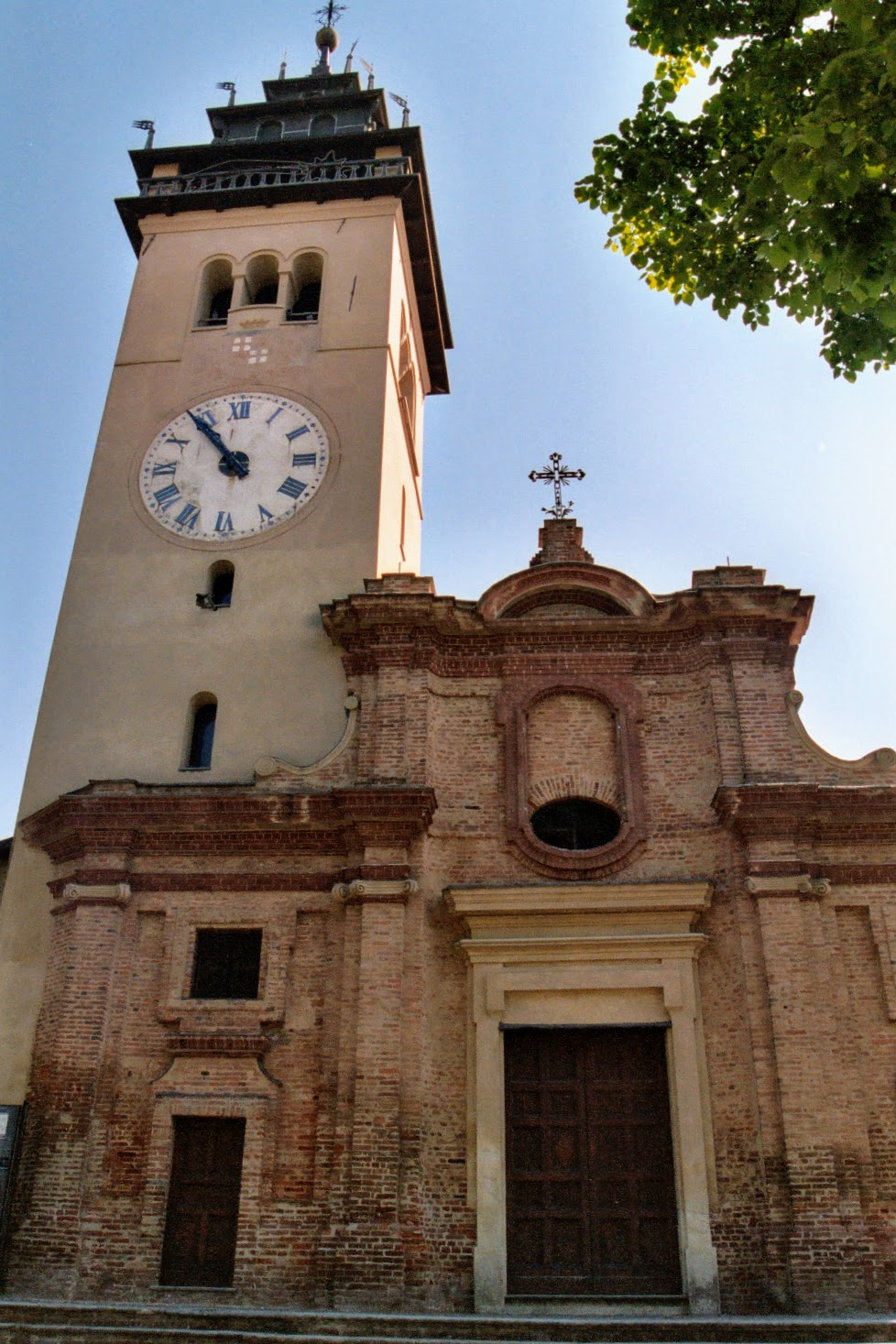
San Giorgio church, built atop the original settlement of Chieri

- Chieri Cathedral: Gothic-style Duomo (cathedral), also known as Collegiata di Santa Maria della Scala, founded in 1037 and reconstructed in 1405, is the largest in Piedmont, and has a 13th-century octagonal Baptistery which includes a collection of 13th century frescoes. Its stained glass windows are the work of renowned glass artist Silvio Vigliaturo.
- San Giorgio: hilltop church dominating the historical centre and offering commanding views of the entire city.
- San Filippo: church on the principal Via Vittorio Emanuele, boasting an example of Italian Baroque-style face-brick façade.
- San Guglielmo
- The Arco (Triumphal Arch), dedicated to Charles Emmanuel I and Emmanuel Philibert, Duke of Savoy.
- Santi Bernardino e Rocco
- Sanctuary of the Santissima Annunziata
- San Domenico: gothic style church
- Chiesa delle Orfanelle, Chieri

== Sports ==
Chieri is home to Chieri ’76 Volleyball, a professional women's volleyball club playing in the Serie A1. The town also has a semi-professional football club A.S.D. Chieri, who play in the Serie D.

== People ==
- Giuseppe Avezzana (1797–1879), Italian general and politician who previously fought under Napoleon in 1813–14
- Giuseppe Benedetto Cottolengo (1786–1842), Catholic priest and saint, died in Chieri
- David Levi (1816–98), Italian poet and patriot
- Giovanni Perrone (1794–1876), theologian
- Roberto Rosato (1943–2010), football player
- Giacomo Segre (1839-1894), Italian artillery officer in the Third Italian War of Independence, died in Chieri
- Francesco Stacchino (born 1940), football player

== Notable events ==
At 8:30 a.m. on Tuesday, 15 October 2002, Chieri experienced one of Italy's worst civilian massacres outside of wartime when unemployed craftsman Mauro Antonello (40), a gun enthusiast with a history of mental illness, went on a shooting rampage in Via Parini Street within the Borgo Venezia Quarter on the outskirts of the city.

Using four weapons (including three semi-automatic), the perpetrator killed seven people, starting with his ex-wife Carla Bergamin, at whose house the tragedy occurred. His other victims included her widowed mother Teresa Gobbo; Carla's brother Sergio Bargamin and his wife Margherita Feyles, who operated a textile workshop on the ground floor of their house; next-door neighbour Decio Guerra along with his wife; and Pierangela Gramaglia, a friend of Margherita's who also worked for them at their workshop.

The perpetrator killed himself before police arrived on the scene.

== Gastronomy ==
=== Chieri's Focaccia ===
This town has among its culinary specialities a sweet flatbread, a completely homemade recipe, which is eaten at the end of a meal. In order to prepare it, it is necessary to use a dough made of water, flour, milk, eggs, butter, sugar and beer yeast. This mix is then put in the oven so that it can caramelize. These days, one can buy the traditional version, which weighs half a kilo.

== Library ==
In Chieri, there is the Nicolo and Paola Francone Library. The project for the renovation of the building and its furniture was given to the architect and library expert Gianfranco Franchini from Genoa. He renovated the interior design with pragmatism, having as a priority the use of pieces of furniture from the 1950s to set up the library. For Franchini, those pieces of furniture had to be in line with the design style of the former cotton mill Tabasso.

Chieri is twinned with:

- Épinal, France
- Nanoro, Burkina Faso
- Tolve, Italy
- Adria, Italy
