= Guglielmo Caccia =

Italian painter (1568–1625)

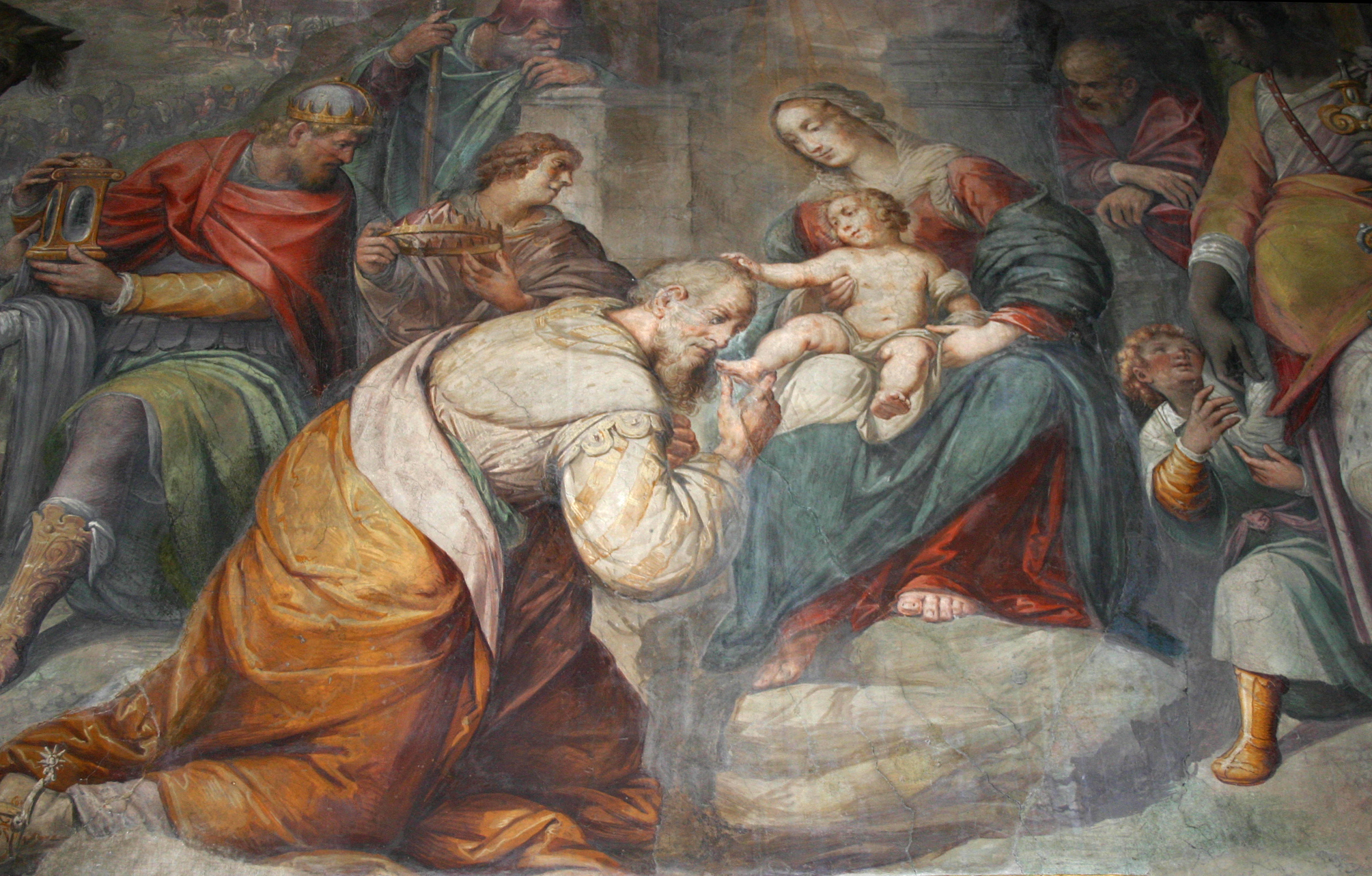
Guglielmo Caccia, right-side nave Adoration of the Magi (detail), Sant'Alessandro in Zebedia, Milan

Guglielmo Caccia called il Moncalvo (9 May 1568 – 1625) was an Italian painter of sacred subjects in a Mannerist style.

== Biography ==
He was born in Montabone near Acqui. He is said to have been a pupil of Lorenzo Sabbatini. He started painting in Milan, then worked in Pavia, where he was made a citizen. He also painted in Novara, Vercelli, Alessandria, and Turin, and Genoa.

His best work, Deposition from the Cross, is at the church of San Gaudenzio, Novara. He also painted for the cupola of the dome of San Paolo in Novara. He painted for the Church of the Conventuali in Moncalvo. He painted a St. Anthony Abbot with St Paul for the church of Sant'Antonio Abate in Milan. He painted in the Sacro Monte di Crea. He was a collaborator in some works with Gaudenzio Ferrari. Daniele Crespi and Giorgio Alberino were among his pupils, as was his daughter, Orsola. He painted in oil a St. Peter for the Chiesa della Croce, St. Theresa for the church of the Trinity, both in Turin, and a Deposition for the church of San Gaudenzio at Novara. At Moncalvo, the church of the Conventuali has numerous works by him; at the church of San Domenico, Chieri, he painted the Raising of Lazarus and the Miracle of the Loaves. He painted frescoes in the church of Confraternity of San Michele in Casale.

Among his pupils was Francesco Fea.
