= List of municipalities of the Province of Novara =

The following is a list of the 87 municipalities (comuni) of the Province of Novara in the region of Piedmont in Italy.

== List ==
Municipality	Population (2026)	Area (km²)	Density
Agrate Conturbia	1,579	14.54	108.6
Ameno	866	10.00	86.6
Armeno	2,089	31.52	66.3
Arona	13,632	15.17	898.6
Barengo	734	19.49	37.7
Bellinzago Novarese	9,344	39.18	238.5
Biandrate	1,384	12.45	111.2
Boca	1,145	9.61	119.1
Bogogno	1,324	8.51	155.6
Bolzano Novarese	1,110	3.30	336.4
Borgo Ticino	5,145	13.37	384.8
Borgolavezzaro	2,025	21.09	96.0
Borgomanero	21,202	32.27	657.0
Briga Novarese	2,730	4.75	574.7
Briona	1,129	24.76	45.6
Caltignaga	2,453	22.32	109.9
Cameri	10,867	39.99	271.7
Carpignano Sesia	2,457	14.66	167.6
Casalbeltrame	1,047	16.04	65.3
Casaleggio Novara	917	10.53	87.1
Casalino	1,586	39.49	40.2
Casalvolone	888	17.49	50.8
Castellazzo Novarese	331	10.79	30.7
Castelletto Sopra Ticino	9,834	14.64	671.7
Cavaglietto	387	6.49	59.6
Cavaglio d'Agogna	1,143	9.83	116.3
Cavallirio	1,290	8.33	154.9
Cerano	6,995	32.64	214.3
Colazza	553	3.16	175.0
Comignago	1,264	4.45	284.0
Cressa	1,559	7.10	219.6
Cureggio	2,619	8.51	307.8
Divignano	1,428	5.10	280.0
Dormelletto	2,556	7.25	352.6
Fara Novarese	2,009	9.21	218.1
Fontaneto d'Agogna	2,656	21.17	125.5
Galliate	15,884	29.37	540.8
Garbagna Novarese	1,397	10.05	139.0
Gargallo	1,751	3.75	466.9
Gattico-Veruno	5,311	26.16	203.0
Ghemme	3,429	20.64	166.1
Gozzano	5,464	12.58	434.3
Granozzo con Monticello	1,302	19.52	66.7
Grignasco	4,299	14.33	300.0
Invorio	4,290	17.37	247.0
Landiona	518	7.28	71.2
Lesa	2,203	13.58	162.2
Maggiora	1,627	10.66	152.6
Mandello Vitta	213	5.85	36.4
Marano Ticino	1,623	7.79	208.3
Massino Visconti	1,127	6.86	164.3
Meina	2,340	7.54	310.3
Mezzomerico	1,220	7.72	158.0
Miasino	805	5.52	145.8
Momo	2,405	23.59	101.9
Nebbiuno	1,859	8.27	224.8
Nibbiola	833	11.34	73.5
Novara	103,238	103.05	1,001.8
Oleggio	14,270	37.79	377.6
Oleggio Castello	2,225	5.94	374.6
Orta San Giulio	1,086	6.65	163.3
Paruzzaro	2,121	5.23	405.5
Pella	874	8.13	107.5
Pettenasco	1,296	7.07	183.3
Pisano	794	2.77	286.6
Pogno	1,365	9.87	138.3
Pombia	2,119	12.30	172.3
Prato Sesia	1,829	12.13	150.8
Recetto	1,029	8.85	116.3
Romagnano Sesia	3,759	17.98	209.1
Romentino	5,658	17.69	319.8
San Maurizio d'Opaglio	2,931	8.51	344.4
San Nazzaro Sesia	701	11.45	61.2
San Pietro Mosezzo	1,960	34.90	56.2
Sillavengo	576	9.54	60.4
Sizzano	1,320	10.75	122.8
Soriso	722	6.37	113.3
Sozzago	1,105	12.92	85.5
Suno	2,662	21.33	124.8
Terdobbiate	462	8.46	54.6
Tornaco	876	13.24	66.2
Trecate	21,305	38.22	557.4
Vaprio d'Agogna	952	10.01	95.1
Varallo Pombia	5,023	13.61	369.1
Vespolate	2,080	17.78	117.0
Vicolungo	851	13.29	64.0
Vinzaglio	564	15.46	36.5

== See also ==
- List of municipalities of Piedmont
- List of municipalities of Italy
