= Novarese =

Novarese is an English and Italian adjective meaning ‘pertaining to Novara’, a city in Piedmont in north-west Italy, or ‘pertaining to the Province of Novara’. As a noun the primary meaning is ‘a person (etc.) from Novara’; it is also an Italian surname.

It refers to:

Language

- Novarese Lombard

Communes in the Province of Novara

- Bellinzago Novarese
- Bolzano Novarese
- Briga Novarese
- Castellazzo Novarese
- Fara Novarese
- Garbagna Novarese

People from Novara

- Category:People from Novara

People named Novarese

- Aldo Novarese (1920–1995), Italian font designer
  - Novarese, a font designed by Aldo Novarese (1978)
- Vittorio Nino Novarese (1907–1983), Italian American costume designer in Hollywood
