= Mandello Vitta =

- Comune
- Comune di Mandello Vitta
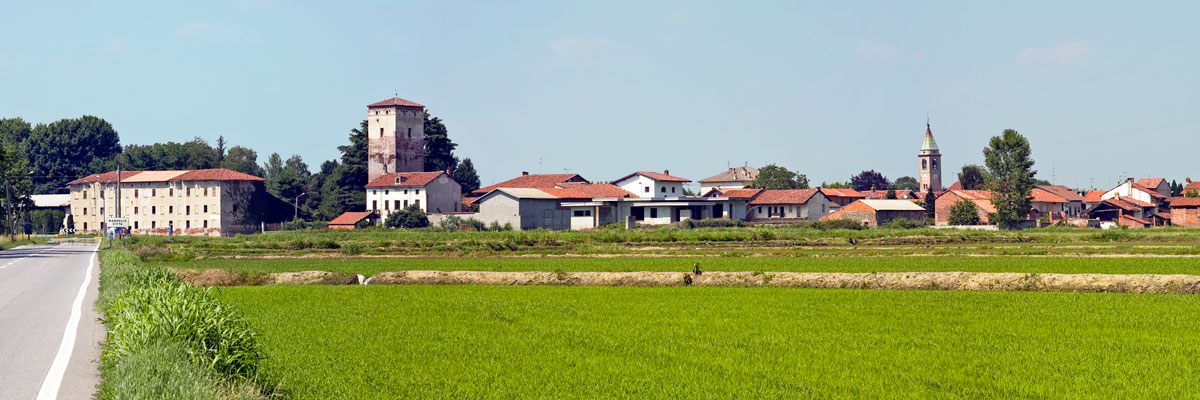
- View of Mandello Vitta

- Location within Italy Location within Piedmont
- Coordinates: 45°30′N 8°28′E
- Country: Italy
- Region: Piedmont
- Province: Novara (NO)

Government
  - Mayor: Paolo Patrioli

Area
  - Total: 5.85 km^{2} (2.26 sq mi)
- Elevation: 175 m (574 ft)

Population (Dec. 2017)
  - Total: 234
  - Density: 40.0/km^{2} (104/sq mi)
- Demonym: Mandellesi
- Time zone: UTC+1 (CET)
  - Summer (DST): UTC+2 (CEST)
- Postal code: 28060
- Dialing code: 0321
- ISTAT code: 003090
- Patron saint: Saint Lawrence
- Saint day: 10 August
- Website: Official website

Mandello Vitta (Mandel in Piedmontese and in Lombard, IPA pronunciation: /maŋˈdɛl/) is a comune (municipality) in the Province of Novara in the Italian region Piedmont, located about 80 kilometres (50 mi) northeast of Turin and about 13 kilometres (8 mi) northwest of Novara.

The comune is located in the western part of the provincial territory that lies between the rivers Sesia and Agogna.

Mandello Vitta borders the following municipalities: Casaleggio Novara, Castellazzo Novarese, Landiona, Sillavengo, and Vicolungo.

Mandello Vitta is 5 km far from the strada provinciale 299 della Valsesia (SP 299) that connects Novara and Alagna Valsesia, in the Province of Vercelli. The comune is easily accessible by the motorway Autostrada A4 Turin-Trieste through the junction "Biandrate-Vicolungo".

Mandello Vitta is also part of some thematic itineraries of the Province of Novara.

== Toponymy ==
The etymology of the name Mandello derives from the founder Rubaconte da Mandello, Podestà of the Comune of Novara during the 13th century, whose family originated from Mandello del Lario.

The name Vitta was added after the Italian Unification to distinguish Mandello Vitta from Mandello del Lario, a town and comune in Lombardy. Vitta was a family who owned fields and industries in the comune during the 19th century.

== History ==
Before the foundation of the village, a Lombard settlement may have been present, as remains of a burial ground found here suggest.

In the territory of the comune, a cage cup (Coppa diatreta Trivulzio, 4th century) was found with no damage in a sarcophagus of Roman age. Now it is exposed at the Archaeological Museum in Milan. The inscription "BIBE VIVAS MULTIS ANNIS" ("Drink and you will live for many years") is a great sponsorship for wine produced in the nearby Novara Hills (Colline Novaresi).

The village of Mandello Vitta was founded by and named after the Podestà of Novara Rubaconte da Mandello, a native of Milan, but his family originated from Mandello del Lario (Province of Lecco). In the land not far from the river Sesia, along the medieval road named "Strada Biandrina" which connected Biandrate to Romagnano Sesia and to Valsesia, in the first decades of the 13th century, he decides to install a new "borgo franco". The aim of this new village was to ensure safe and fast connections from Novara to the Alps and to control the territory along the eastern bank of the river Sesia that was disputed with the rival Commune of Vercelli. Mandello Vitta features a 13th-century medieval tower that is still visible on the south-west side of the village and perfectly preserved (it is one of the architectural symbols of Mandello). The tower was originally intended for land control and toll payment.
Nearby the tower, the castle of Caccia, the family that controlled Mandello since the first years of 16th century, was built. Caccia owned the village until the 18th century. Then, the fiefdom was invested in the Vitta family, who deeply engraved the history of Mandello so that, after the Italian Unification, in 1863, the commune changed its name into Mandello Vitta (r.d. 8 aprile 1863, n. 1234).

In 1928 (r.d. 1 November 1928, n. 2590), the commune of Mandello Vitta merged with the neighbouring village of Vicolungo to form a new municipality, having both the seat of the Town Hall and the name Vicolungo. This political order lasted until 1954 (d.p.r. 24 December 1954) when the reconstitution of Mandello Vitta as an autonomous commune was decreed.

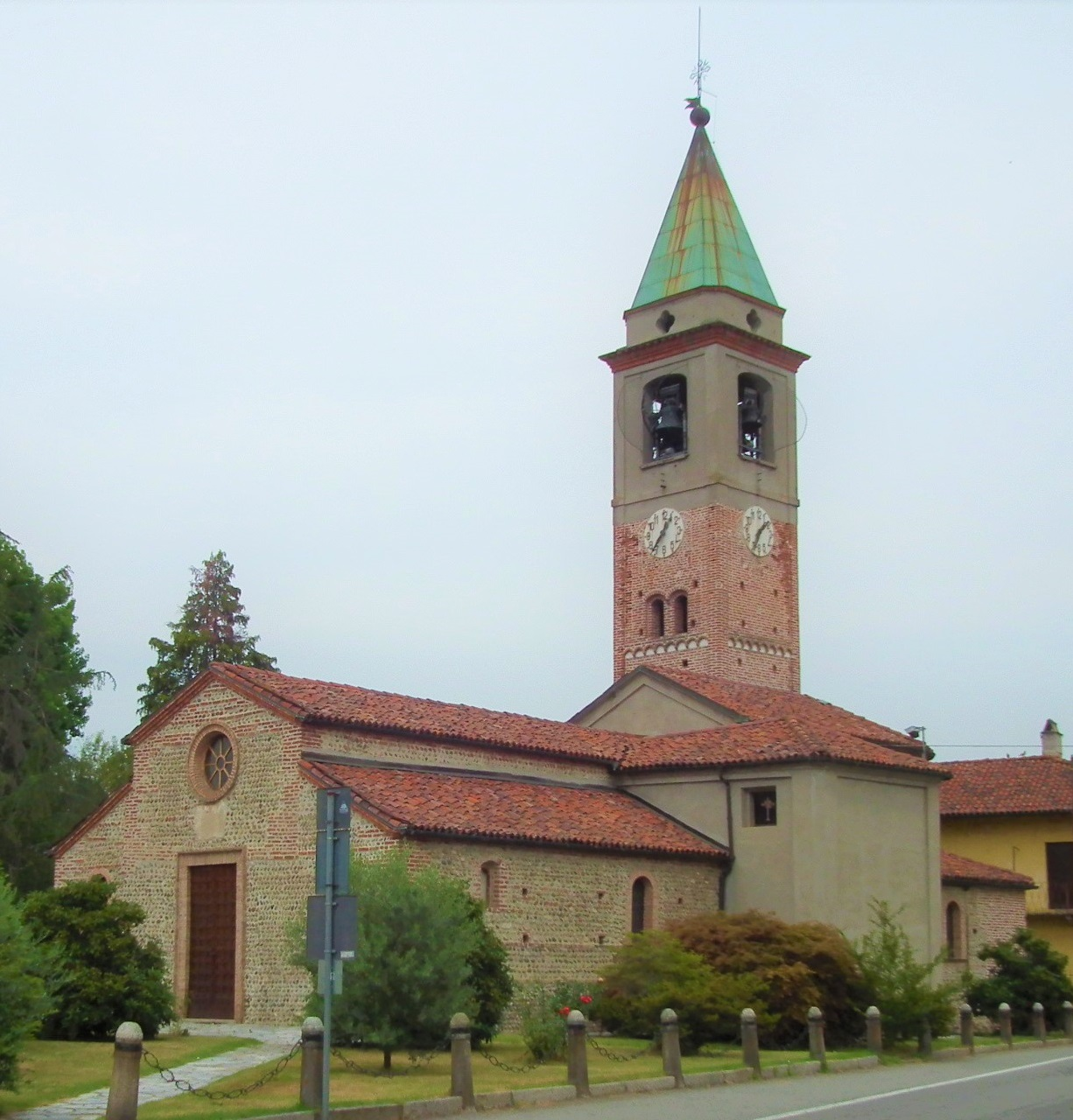
Medieval church (13th century)

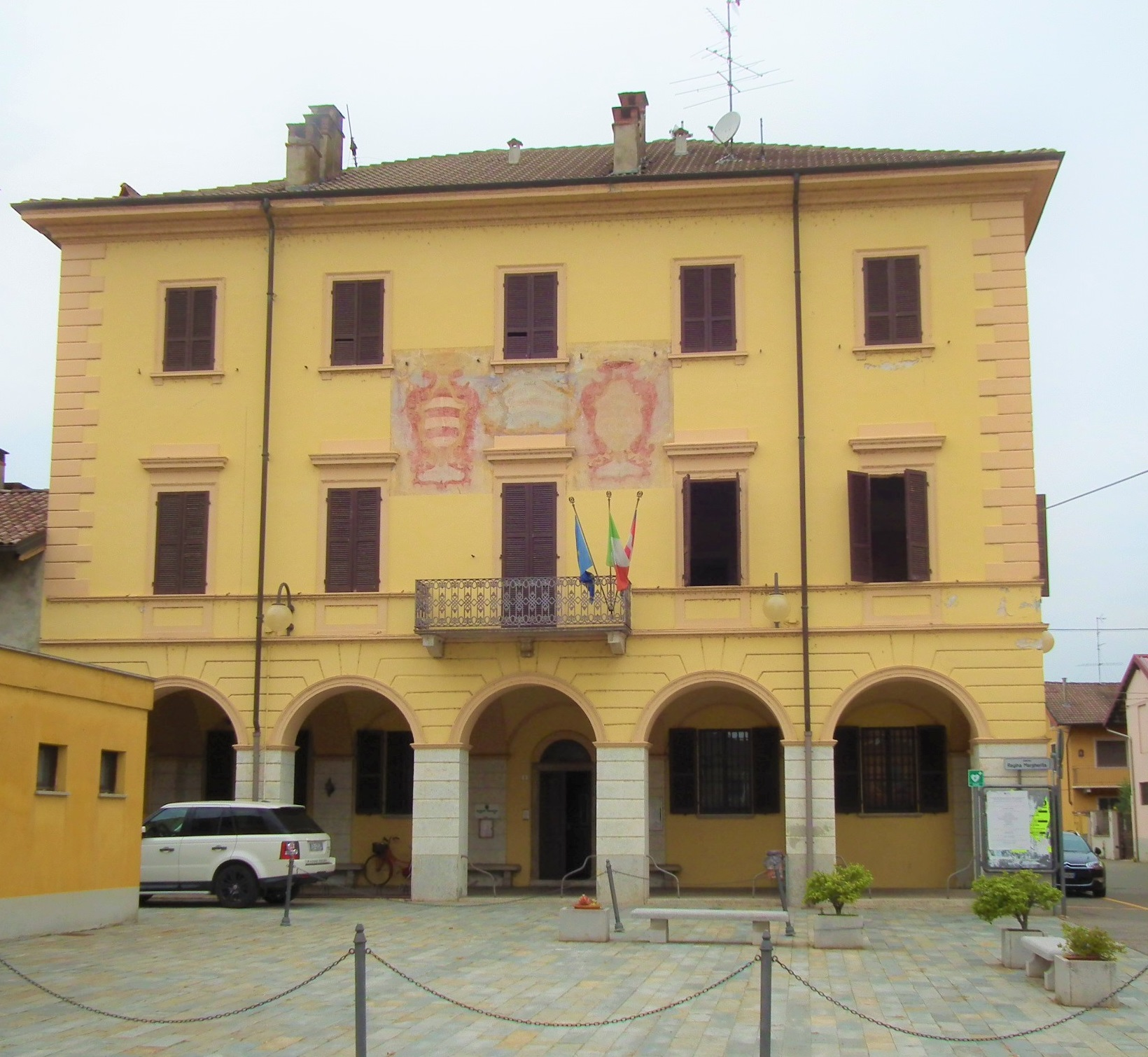
Town Hall

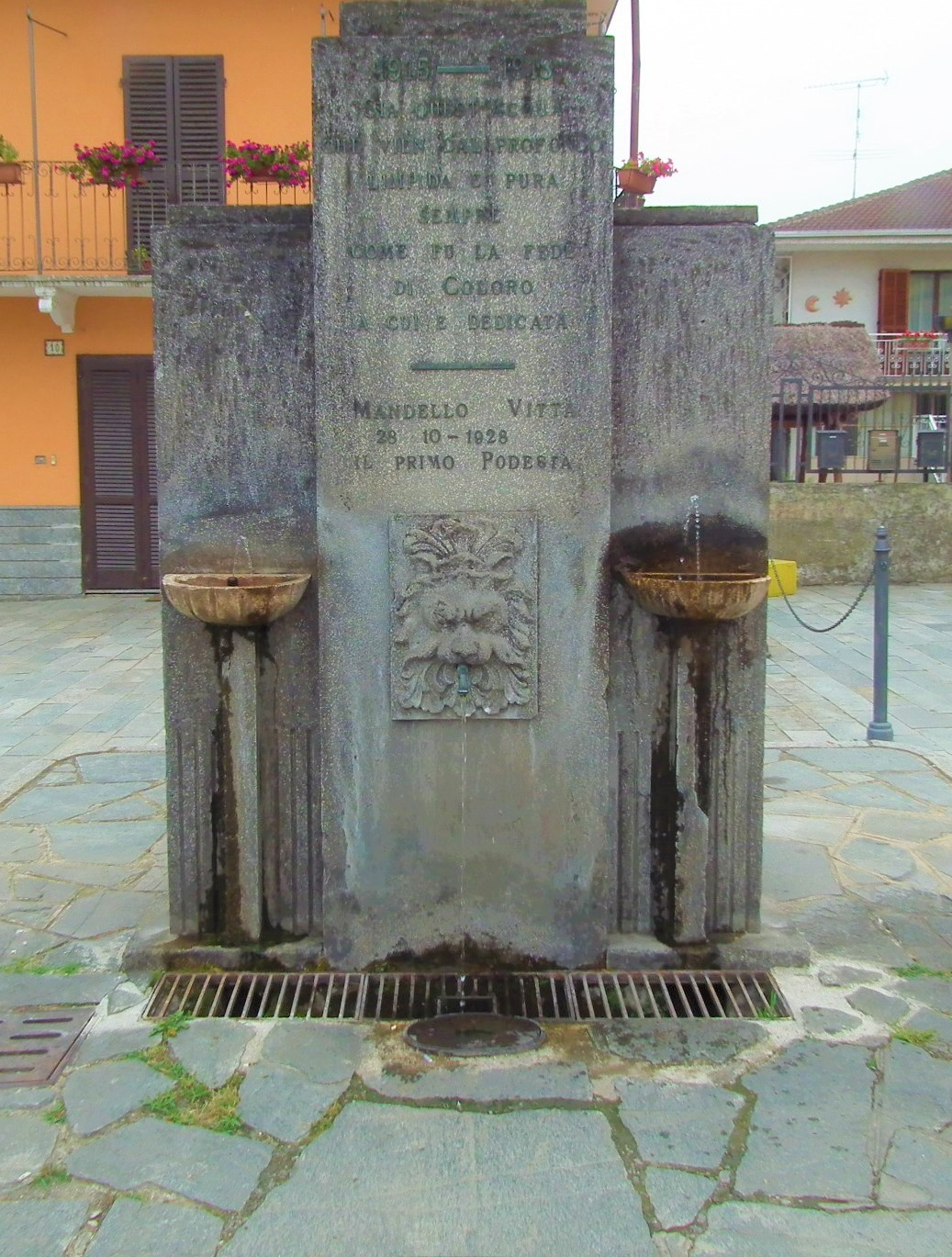
Fountain and WWI memorial

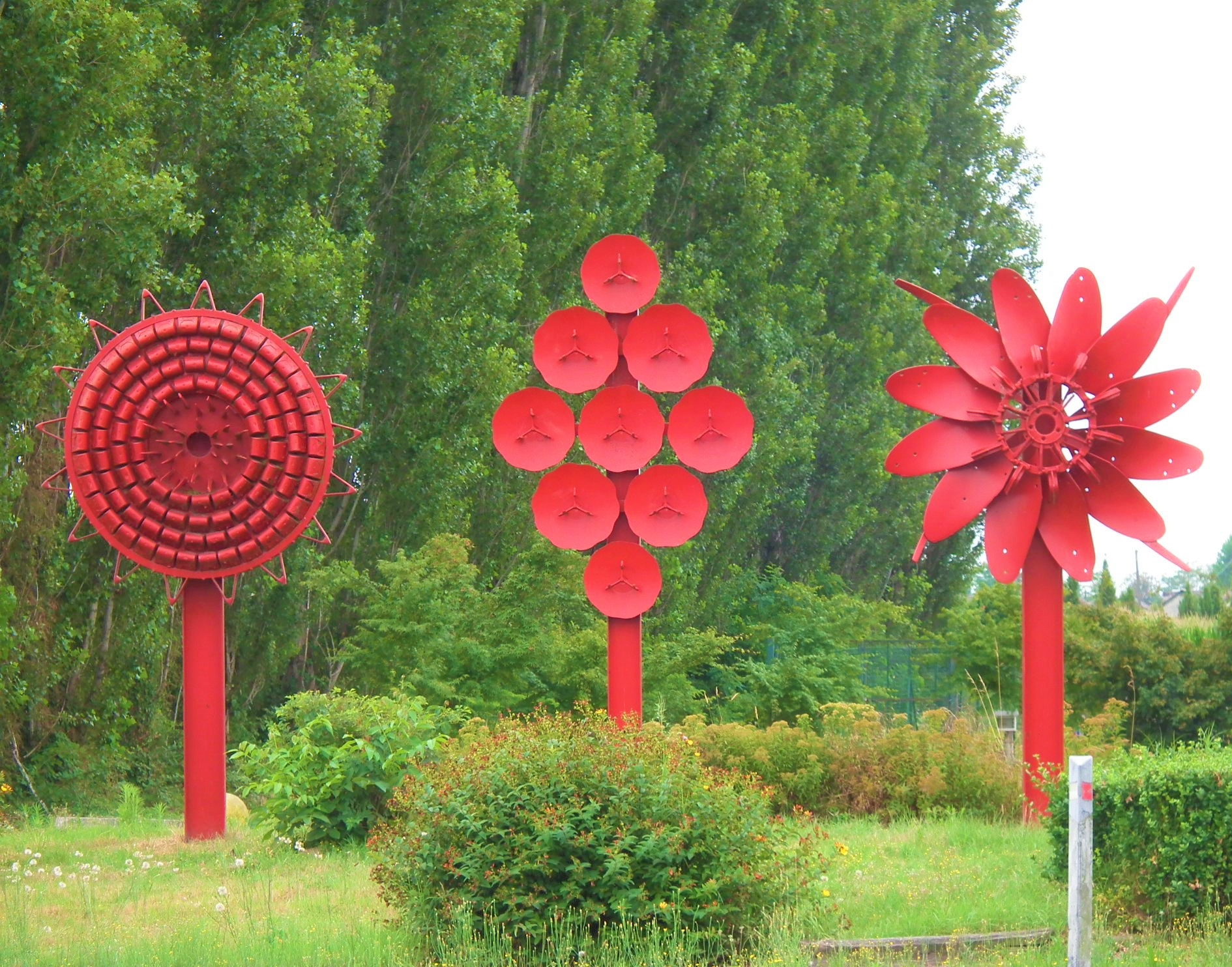
Monument to the agricultural work

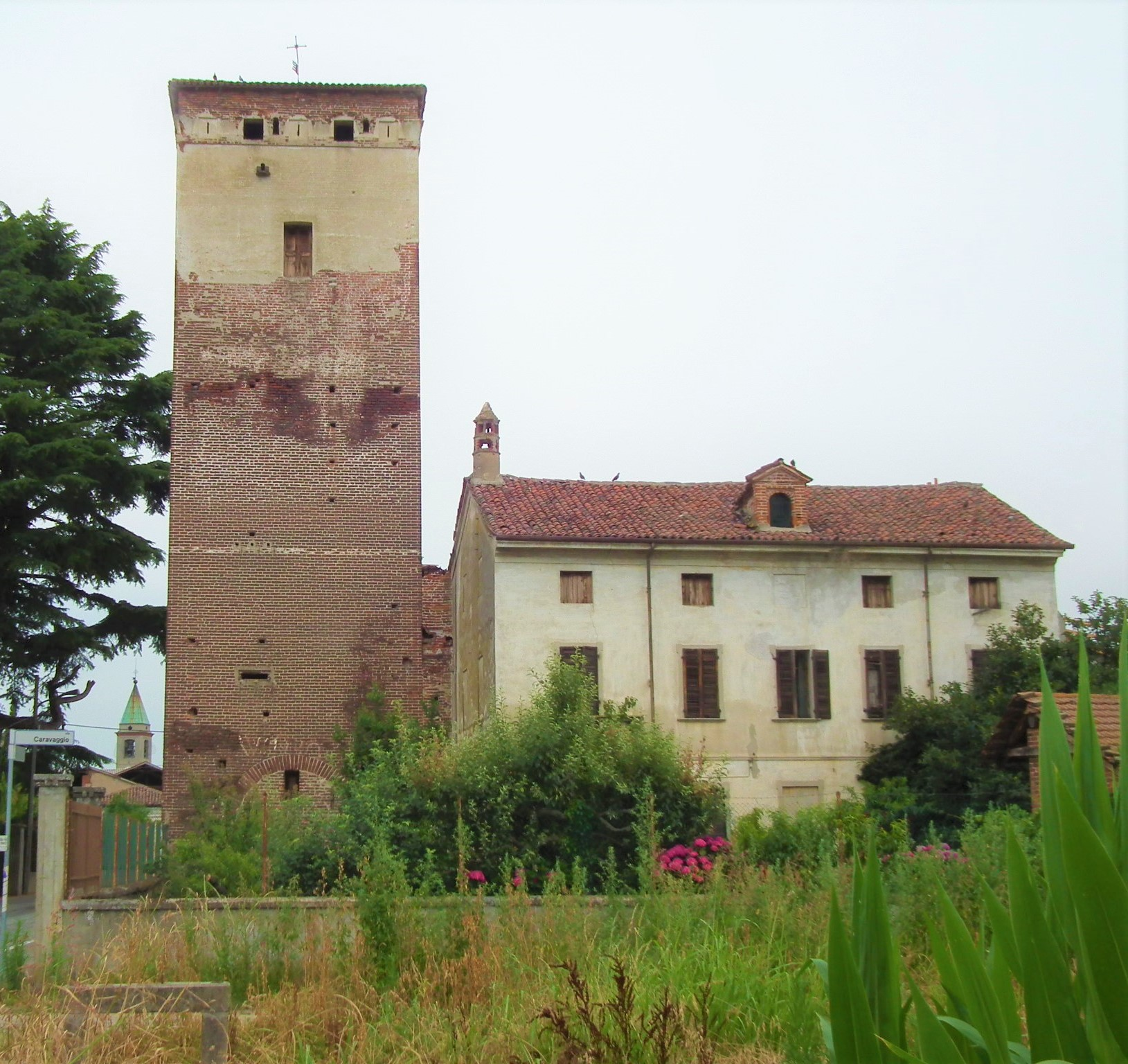
Medieval tower (13th century)

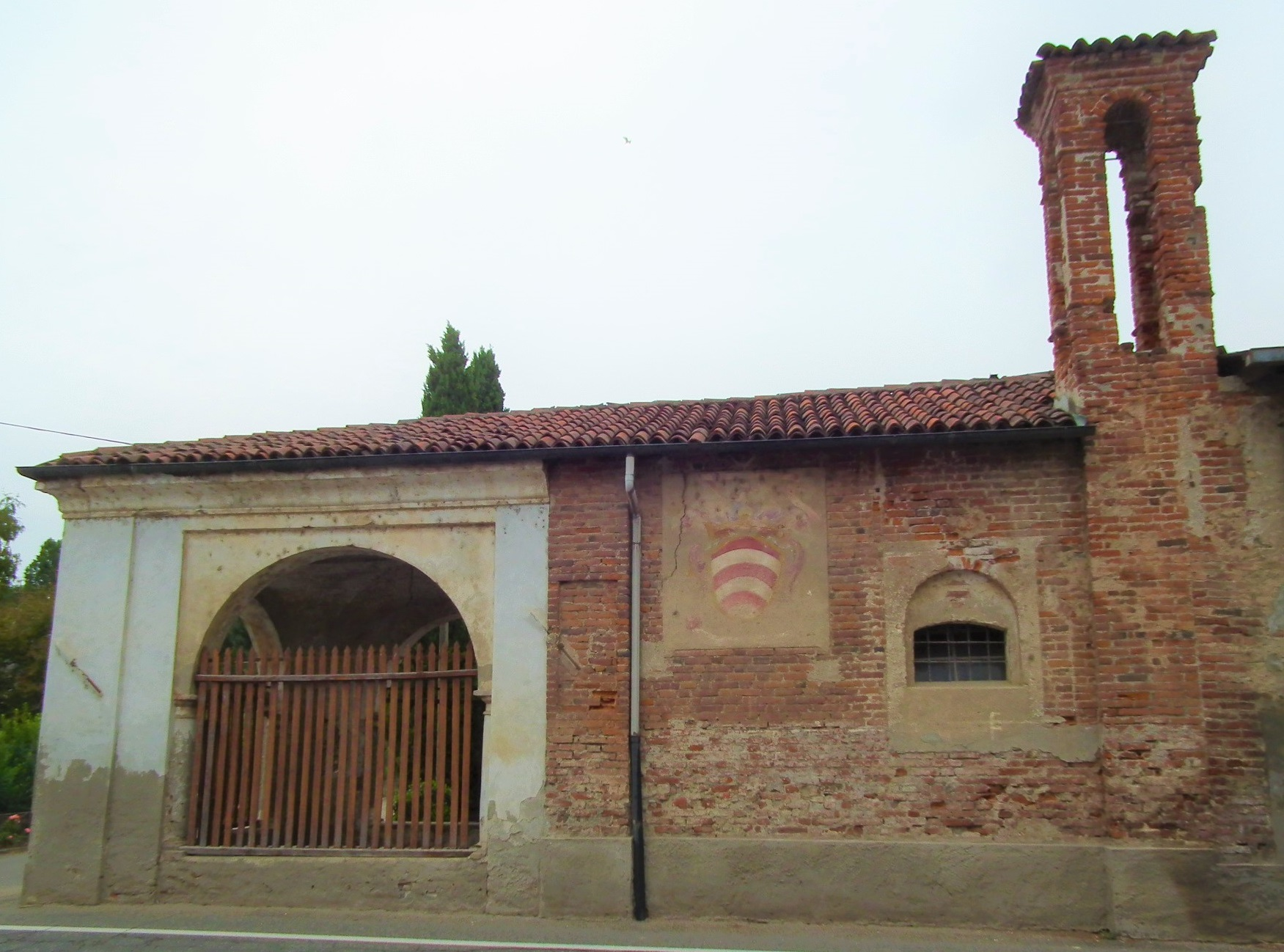
Sant'Antonio church

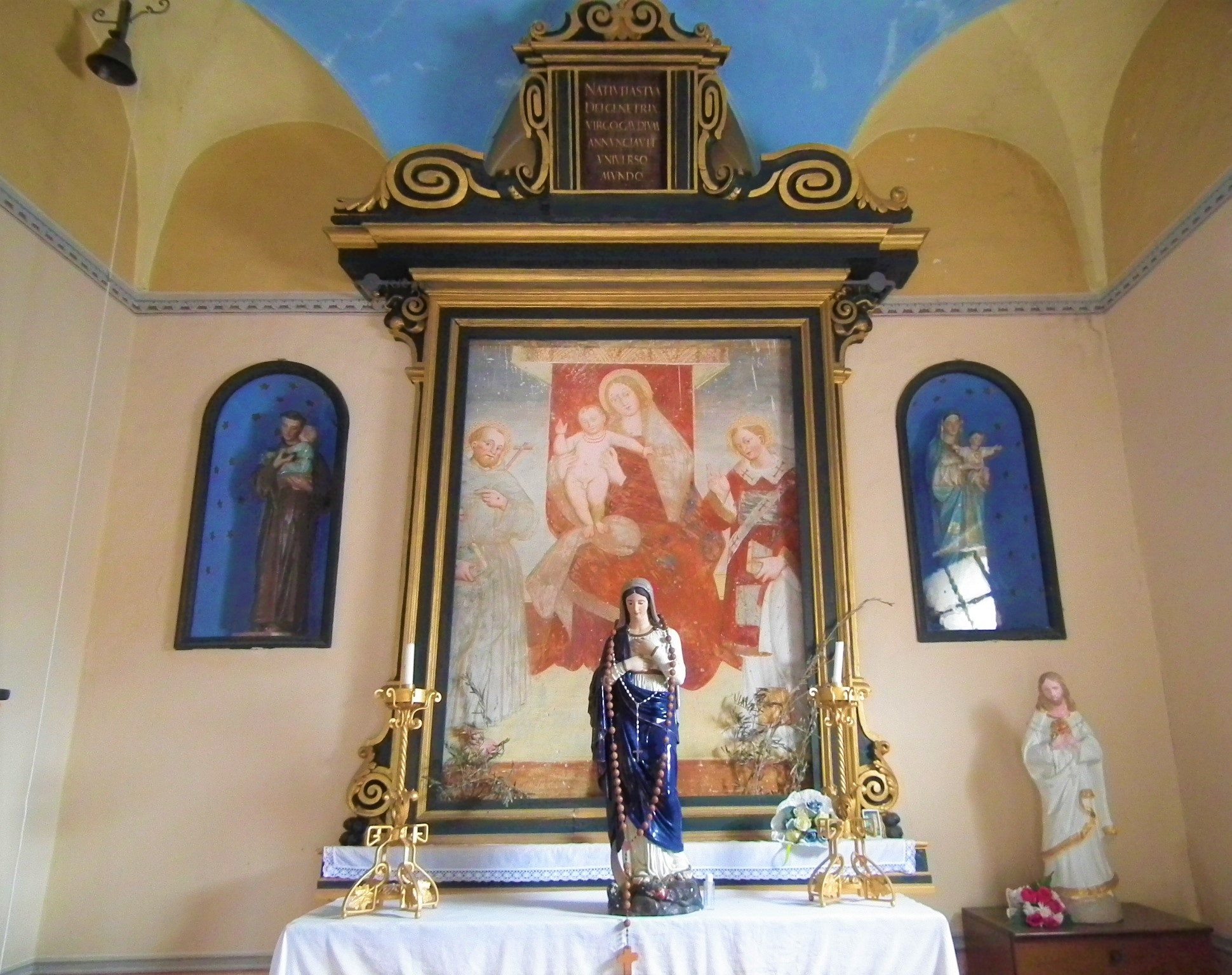
Sant'Antonio church (altar)

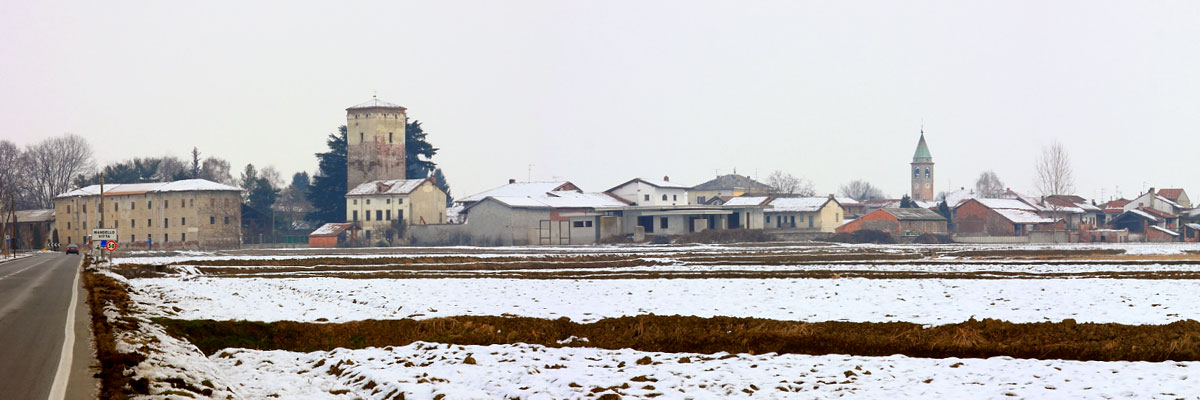
View of Mandello Vitta in winter

== Geography ==
The land around Mandello Vitta can be considered roughly flat, although it gently descends from north to south. The maximum altitude is located at the border with municipalities of Sillavengo and Castellazzo Novarese and the minimum one is southwards on the border with Vicolungo and Casaleggio Novara.

The territory is rich in water streams, whether they come from the river Sesia or from natural springs. The roggia (irrigation canal) Busca touches the north-east side of the village in the direction of Castellazzo Novarese; roggia Biraga flows on the west and it constitutes the border with the municipality of Landiona. Besides these, water flows in streams, cables and smaller ditches that spread it all around the territory of Mandello Vitta. It's interesting to report the presence of the remains of a watermill near the village that, until a few decades ago, exploited the flow of the roggia Busca.

Mandello Vitta is mainly surrounded by rice fields, a cereal widely cultivated in the Province of Novara, which creates during the irrigation period the peculiar "mare a quadretti" (square or checkered sea) of the Novarese rice fields.

== Local cuisine ==
The typical cuisine is connected to the local agricultural and farming products (rice, salami, cheese). Among them: paniscia (a rice-based dish originally of the Provinces of Novara and Vercelli), "Salam d'la Duja" (a salami seasoned in fat), "tapulon" (minced meat), goose or ribs with savoy cabbage, roasted duck, "frittura dolce", gorgonzola cheese, the traditional «bagnetto verde» (savoury green sauce) and fried frogs.

== Transport ==
Main roads are two: the Strada Provinciale SP15/I from Borgo Vercelli to Carpignano Sesia, which does not cross the village, and the SP14 that crosses Mandello Vitta connecting the abovementioned SP15/I to SP 299 "della Valsesia" passing through Castellazzo Novarese. From the latter, 500 m outside the village in the direction of Castellazzo Novarese, a road allows to connect Mandello Vitta with Casaleggio Novara.

Multiple rural roads exist to reach fields and many farmhouses, such as Biola, Flecchia, Gagliarda, Moranza, San Rocco, Cascina delle Oche, Eurosia (Bröss [brøs] in local dialect).

The bus line Novara-Biandrate-Vercelli can take passengers to the capital city of Novara in about half an hour.

The municipal territory is crossed by the railway line Biella–Novara railway, however Mandello does not have a railway station. Nearest stations are in Casaleggio and Carpignano Sesia.

Between 1884 and 1993, Mandello was served by the Vercelli-Biandrate-Fara tramway.

== Architecture ==
=== Chiesa di San Lorenzo (Saint Lawrence's Church) ===
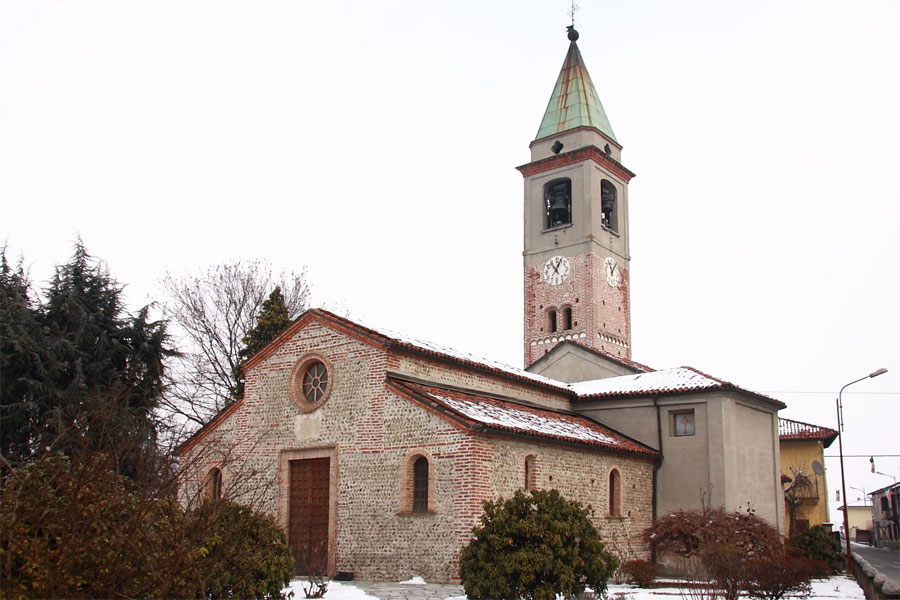
Saint Lawrence's Church in winter

In the town square stands the parish church dedicated to Saint Lawrence the deacon, patron saint of the town, built in the late Romanesque period at the end of the 12th century. The bell tower stands on the right side of the church, and it is from late Romanesque period, as well. The Church was probably built in the 14th century due to the presence of a cobblestone wall arranged in horizontal courses. On the other hand, the apsidal part, in brick, is from a later period.

Although the foundation is medieval, the architectural forms acquired after the Baroque retouches prevail. The building consists of three naves, the largest one covered by a vault introduced by a series of veils with a lower bezel and the side ones covered by cross vaults. The short transept consists of two rectangular-shaped chapels opened in the Baroque age, dedicated of the Madonna del Rosario on the left and to the Crucifix on the right. The presbytery and the choir are flanked by two small naves in which recent restorations have led to the discovery of interesting paintings from the 14th and 16th centuries.

=== Cappella di Sant'Antonio (Saint Anthony's Chapel) ===
Dated around 1450, this chapel is supposed to have become, about the 17th century, an oratory instituted by the noble priest Giovanni Battista Caccia (whose remains are buried in a crypt in front of the chapel of the Crucifix in the Chiesa di San Lorenzo).

This smaller Church is characterized by a single hall with brickwork, partly plastered, covered by vaults and with a gabled roof with a pavilion surmounted by tiles. Inside, among the various frescoes, worthy of mention is a 15th-century painting depicting a Madonna and Child.

=== Tower ===
The medieval tower is the emblem of the architecture of Mandello Vitta. It was part of a larger fortification in defence of the borgofranco. The building can be dated around the mid 12th century, and it represents, for the area of Novara, one of the best preserved buildings of its kind. Currently, no trace of the castle (castrum in Medieval Latin) is no longer evident; it is assumed that it was located around the tower originally intended for both control and payment of tolls.

The tower is about 30 metres high, with a square plan, in brick, and it presents successive moments of construction: a first moment between the 12th and 13th centuries, corresponding to the period in which the village was founded, the second in the Gothic and late Gothic periods and then renovated in 1594.

=== WWI Memorial ===
The fountain in Piazza Regina Margherita, inaugurated on October 28, 1928, commemorates the fallen of the World War I through the epigraph that reads:

«1915 - 1918

Sia quest'acqua

che vien dal profondo

limpida e pura

sempre

come fu la fede

di coloro

a cui è dedicata

Mandello Vitta

28-10-1928

Il primo podestà»

Which literally translates:

1915 - 1918. Let this water coming from the deep ground be clear and pure ever as the faith of those whom it is dedicated to was. Mandello Vitta 10-28-1928.The first Podestà.

=== Town Hall ===
The Town Hall shows 19th-century characters, and it is divided into three floors.

The majestic palace was built in 1864, as indicated by the date between the two noble coats of arms that decorate the entrance door in the upper part; one of which belongs to the Caccia family. The ground floor has a portico with five arches supported by pillars. In the portico one can find an ATM (Postamat) placed by Poste Italiane and an AED for medical emergencies.
