= San Pietro Mosezzo =

- Comune
- Comune di San Pietro Mosezzo
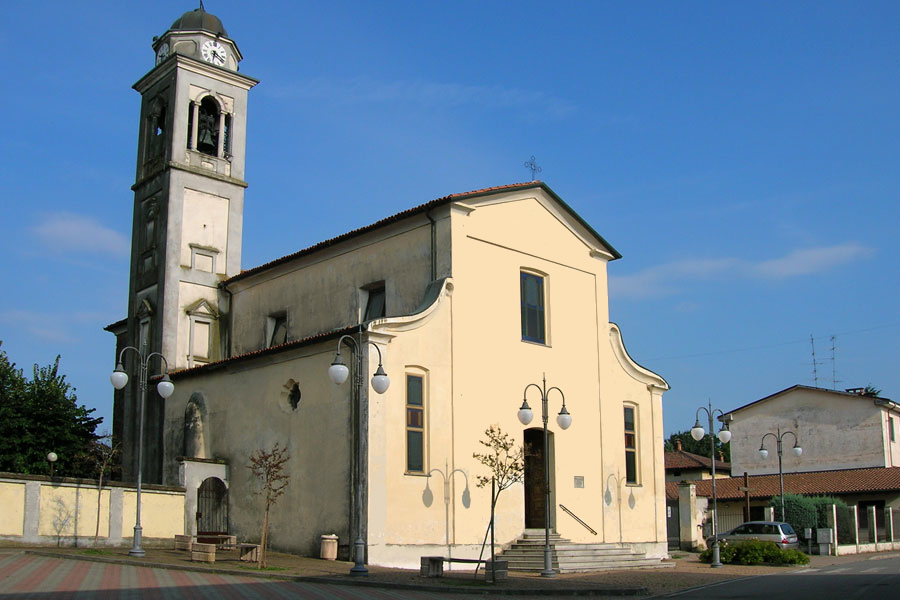
- Parish church, San Pietro Mosezzo

- Coat of arms

- Location within Italy Location within Piedmont
- Coordinates: 45°27′N 8°33′E
- Country: Italy
- Region: Piedmont
- Province: Novara (NO)
- Frazioni: Cesto, Mosezzo, Nibbia, San Pietro

Government
  - Mayor: Tommaso Difonzo

Area
  - Total: 34.83 km^{2} (13.45 sq mi)
- Elevation: 155 m (509 ft)

Population (31 December 2010)
  - Total: 1,992
  - Density: 57.19/km^{2} (148.1/sq mi)
- Demonym: Sanpietrini
- Time zone: UTC+1 (CET)
  - Summer (DST): UTC+2 (CEST)
- Postal code: 28060
- Dialing code: 0321
- Patron saint: Sts. Peter and Paul
- Saint day: June 29
- Website: www.comune.sanpietromosezzo.no.it

San Pietro Mosezzo is a comune (municipality) in the Province of Novara in the Italian region Piedmont, located about 80 kilometres (50 miles) northeast of Turin and about 5 kilometres (3 miles) west of Novara.

San Pietro Mosezzo is divided into four frazioni (wards)—San Pietro (chef-lieu), Cesto, Mosezzo and Nibbia—and three hamlets—Cascinazza, San Stefano and Torre San Pietrina (San Pietro Mosezzo's industrial park). The Canale Cavour flows across the town.

San Pietro Mosezzo borders the following municipalities: Biandrate, Briona, Caltignaga, Casaleggio Novara, Casalino, Novara, and Vicolungo.

== Main sights ==
- Parish church of Saint Peter (16th century)
- Parish church of Saints Vito and Modesto (12th century)
- Parish church of Saints Quirico and Judith, at Cesto
- Parish church of Saint Lawrence (11th century), at Nibbia
- Farmstead Motta, whose existence is proven by a sale bill of August 2, 1380 between Gian Galeazzo Visconti and Antonio Pozzo which transferred the property of the lands of Vinzaglio
