= Vicolungo =

- Comune
- Comune di Vicolungo
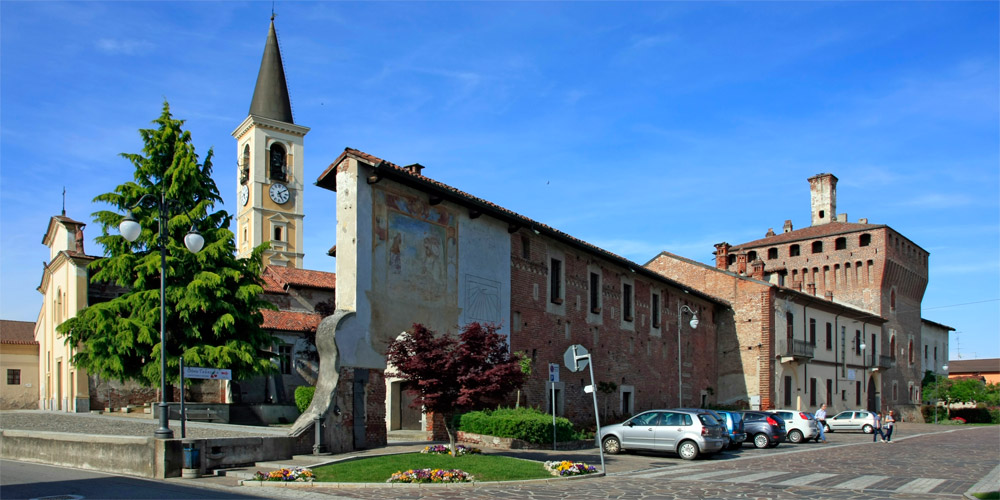
- View of Vicolungo

- Location within Italy Location within Piedmont
- Coordinates: 45°29′N 8°28′E
- Country: Italy
- Region: Piedmont
- Province: Province of Novara (NO)

Area
  - Total: 13.4 km^{2} (5.2 sq mi)

Population (Dec. 2004)
  - Total: 857
  - Density: 64.0/km^{2} (166/sq mi)
- Time zone: UTC+1 (CET)
  - Summer (DST): UTC+2 (CEST)
- Postal code: 28060
- Dialing code: 0321

Vicolungo is a comune (municipality) in the Province of Novara in the Italian region Piedmont, located about 80 kilometres (50 mi) northeast of Turin and about 12 kilometres (7 mi) northwest of Novara. As of 31 December 2004, it had a population of 857 and an area of 13.4 square kilometres (5.2 mi^{2}).

Vicolungo borders the following municipalities: Arborio, Biandrate, Casaleggio Novara, Landiona, Mandello Vitta, Recetto, and San Pietro Mosezzo.

== Demographic evolution ==
Historical population

Year	Pop.	±%
1861	1,064	—
1871	1,182	+11.1%
1881	1,257	+6.3%
1901	1,311	+4.3%
1911	1,249	−4.7%

Year	Pop.	±%
1921	1,169	−6.4%
1931	1,161	−0.7%
1936	1,155	−0.5%
1951	1,056	−8.6%
1961	952	−9.8%

Year	Pop.	±%
1971	858	−9.9%
1981	876	+2.1%
1991	815	−7.0%
2001	842	+3.3%

Source: Data from ISTAT
