= Recetto =

- Comune
- Comune di Recetto
- Location within Italy Location within Piedmont
- Coordinates: 45°28′N 8°26′E
- Country: Italy
- Region: Piedmont
- Province: Province of Novara (NO)

Area
  - Total: 8.8 km^{2} (3.4 sq mi)

Population (Dec. 2004)
  - Total: 865
  - Density: 98/km^{2} (250/sq mi)
- Time zone: UTC+1 (CET)
  - Summer (DST): UTC+2 (CEST)
- Postal code: 28060
- Dialing code: 0321

Recetto is a comune (municipality) in the Province of Novara in the Italian region Piedmont, located about 70 kilometres (43 mi) northeast of Turin and about 14 kilometres (8.7 mi) west of Novara. As of 31 December 2004, it had a population of 865 and an area of 8.8 square kilometres (3.4 mi^{2}).

Recetto borders the following municipalities: Arborio, Biandrate, Greggio, San Nazzaro Sesia, and Vicolungo.

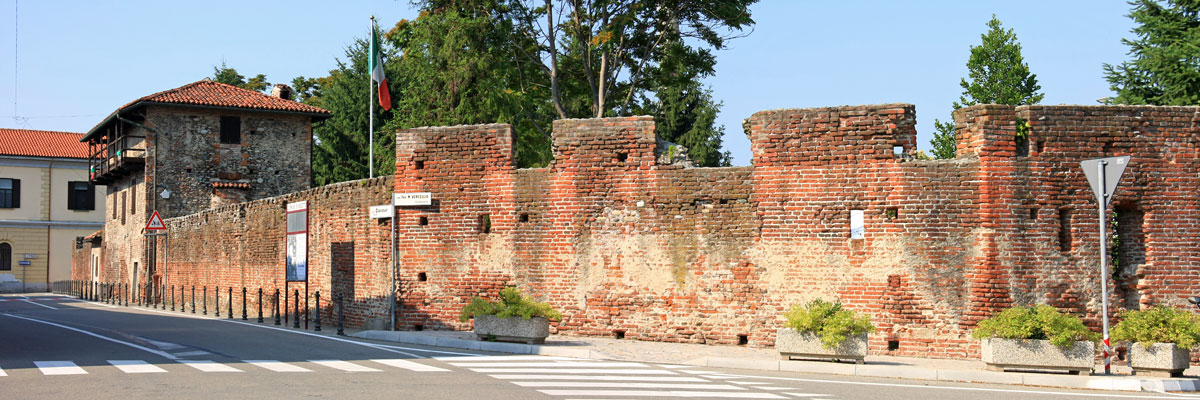
Remains of the wall at Recetto

== Demographic evolution ==
Historical population

Year	Pop.	±%
1861	1,489	—
1871	1,563	+5.0%
1881	1,425	−8.8%
1901	1,530	+7.4%
1911	1,576	+3.0%

Year	Pop.	±%
1921	1,437	−8.8%
1931	1,367	−4.9%
1936	1,364	−0.2%
1951	1,240	−9.1%
1961	1,125	−9.3%

Year	Pop.	±%
1971	985	−12.4%
1981	914	−7.2%
1991	854	−6.6%
2001	897	+5.0%

Source: Data from ISTAT
