= Comignago =

- Comune
- Comune di Comignago
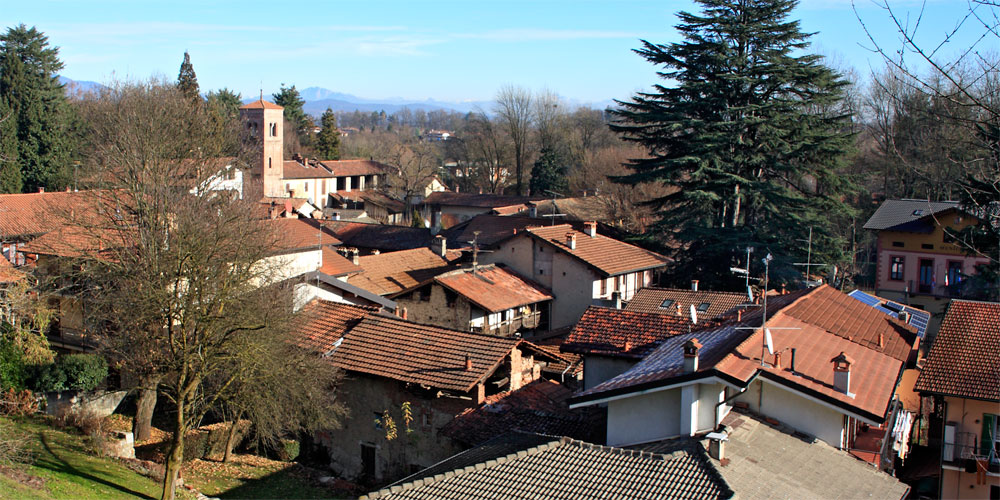
- View of Comignago

- Coat of arms

- Location within Italy Location within Piedmont
- Coordinates: 45°43′N 8°34′E
- Country: Italy
- Region: Piedmont
- Province: Novara (NO)

Government
  - Mayor: Daniele Potenza

Area
  - Total: 4.4 km^{2} (1.7 sq mi)
- Elevation: 268 m (879 ft)

Population (31 December 2010)
  - Total: 1,228
  - Density: 280/km^{2} (720/sq mi)
- Demonym: Comignaghesi
- Time zone: UTC+1 (CET)
  - Summer (DST): UTC+2 (CEST)
- Postal code: 28060
- Dialing code: 0322
- Patron saint: St. John the Baptist

Comignago is a comune (municipality) in the Province of Novara in the Italian region of Piedmont, located about 100 kilometres (62 mi) northeast of Turin and about 30 kilometres (19 mi) north of Novara.

Comignago borders the following municipalities: Arona, Borgo Ticino, Castelletto sopra Ticino, Dormelletto, Gattico-Veruno and Oleggio Castello.
