= Arborio, Piedmont =

Arborio
- Comune
- Comune di Arborio
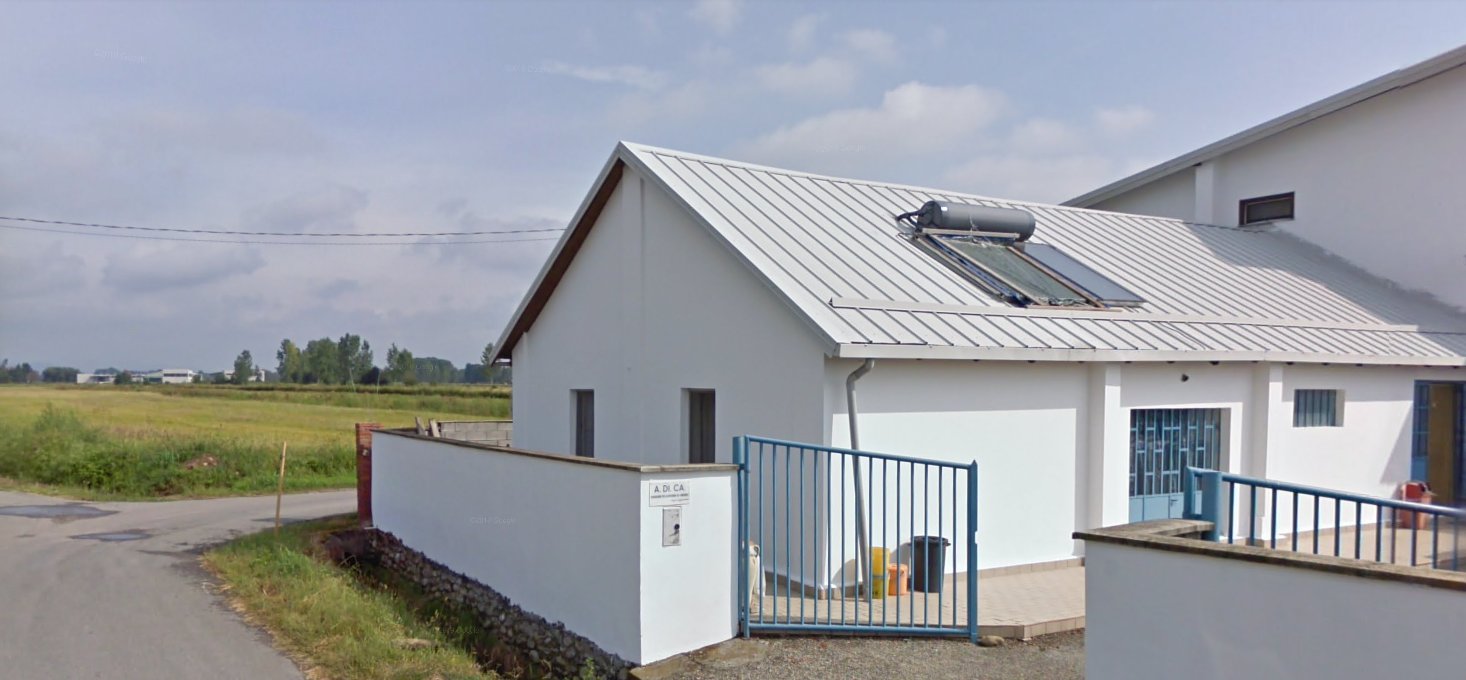
- A Candomblé terreiro (an Afro-Brazilian religious meeting house) in Arborio

- Location within Italy Location within Piedmont
- Coordinates: 45°30′N 8°23′E
- Country: Italy
- Region: Piedmont
- Province: Vercelli (VC)

Government
  - Mayor: Annalisa Ferrarotti

Area
  - Total: 23.2 km^{2} (9.0 sq mi)
- Elevation: 185 m (607 ft)

Population (Dec. 2004)
  - Total: 1,035
  - Density: 44.6/km^{2} (116/sq mi)
- Demonym: Arboriesi
- Time zone: UTC+1 (CET)
  - Summer (DST): UTC+2 (CEST)
- Postal code: 13031
- Dialing code: 0161
- Website: Official website

Arborio is a comune (municipality) in the Province of Vercelli in the Italian region of Piedmont, located about 70 kilometres (43 mi) northeast of Turin and about 20 kilometres (12 mi) north of Vercelli.

Arborio borders the municipalities of Ghislarengo, Greggio, Landiona, Recetto, Rovasenda, San Giacomo Vercellese, Sillavengo, Vicolungo, and Villarboit.

Arborio gave its name to arborio rice, a variety often used to make risotto.
