= Proh Castle =

Castle in Piedmont, Italy

- Castello di Proh
- Briona, Piedmont, Italy
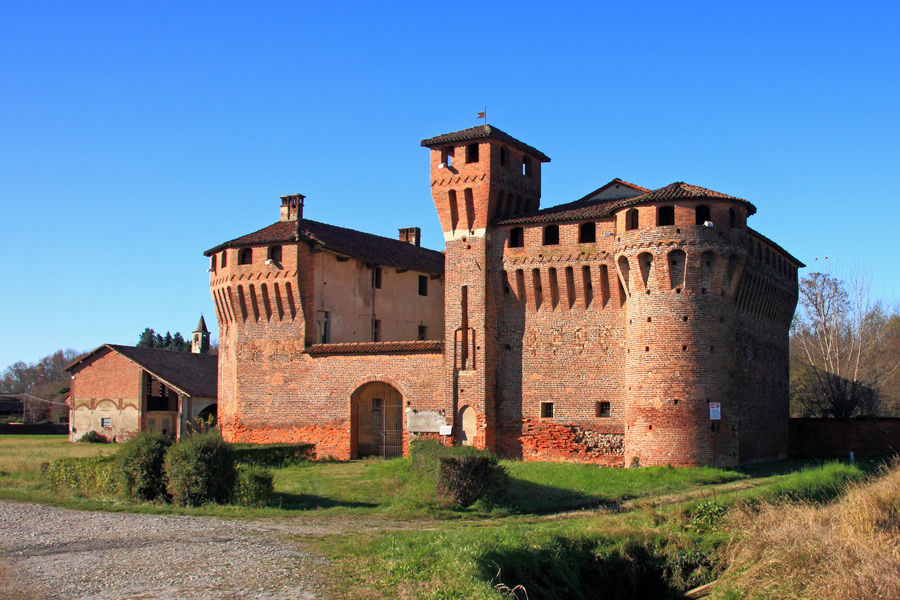
- Proh Castle in 2010

Site information
- Type: Castle

Location
- Coordinates: 45°32′09.51″N 8°30′40.36″E

Proh Castle (Italian: Castello di Proh) is a castle located in Briona, Piedmont, Italy.

== History ==
The castle was built in the second half of the 15th century as a luogo di delizie for Francesco I Sforza, as indicated by a plaque near the entrance. Its purpose was not military: within a five-kilometre radius stood other three well-equipped fortresses—Briona Castle, Barengo Castle, and Castellazzo Novarese Castle—rendering additional defensive structures unnecessary. Its modest size and isolated position in the plain, at the foot of a wooded hill, further confirm its residential and recreational nature. After the Sforza, the castle passed to the Tornelli of Briona, then it was occupied in 1495 by the troops of Ludovico il Moro, and subsequently changed hands several times: to the Caccia in 1597, to the Cattaneo brothers in 1672 (who obtained the comital title two years later), and in the 19th century to the Fantoni, who converted it into a farmhouse. In the mid of the 19th century ownership shifted to Count Arese Lucini, and in the early 1900s the property was acquired first by the Varelli, then by the Marelli of Milan.

== Description ==
The castle is located in Proh in the comune of Briona.

It features an asymmetrical plan, with a slightly irregular rectangular layout and round towers at the northeast and southwest corners. Additional structures stand along the north, south, and west sides, while the courtyard leans against the eastern curtain wall. Originally, two drawbridge-equipped entrances served the site: an eastern postern set in a central turret and a western carriage gate topped by a tower later absorbed into internal buildings. The once-surrounding moats are now filled. Uniform wall heights frame the complex, except for a short eastern stretch.

== Gallery ==
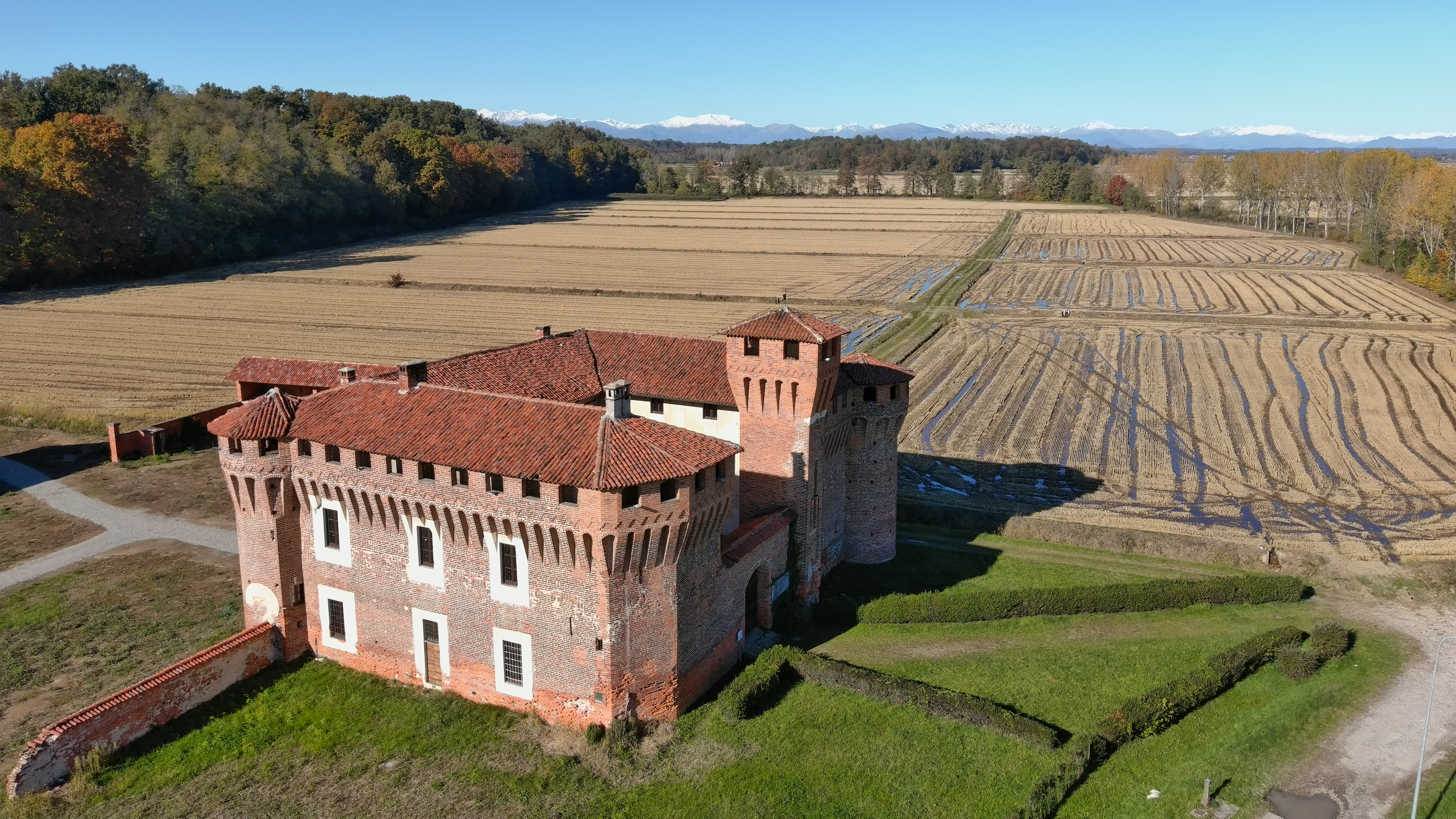

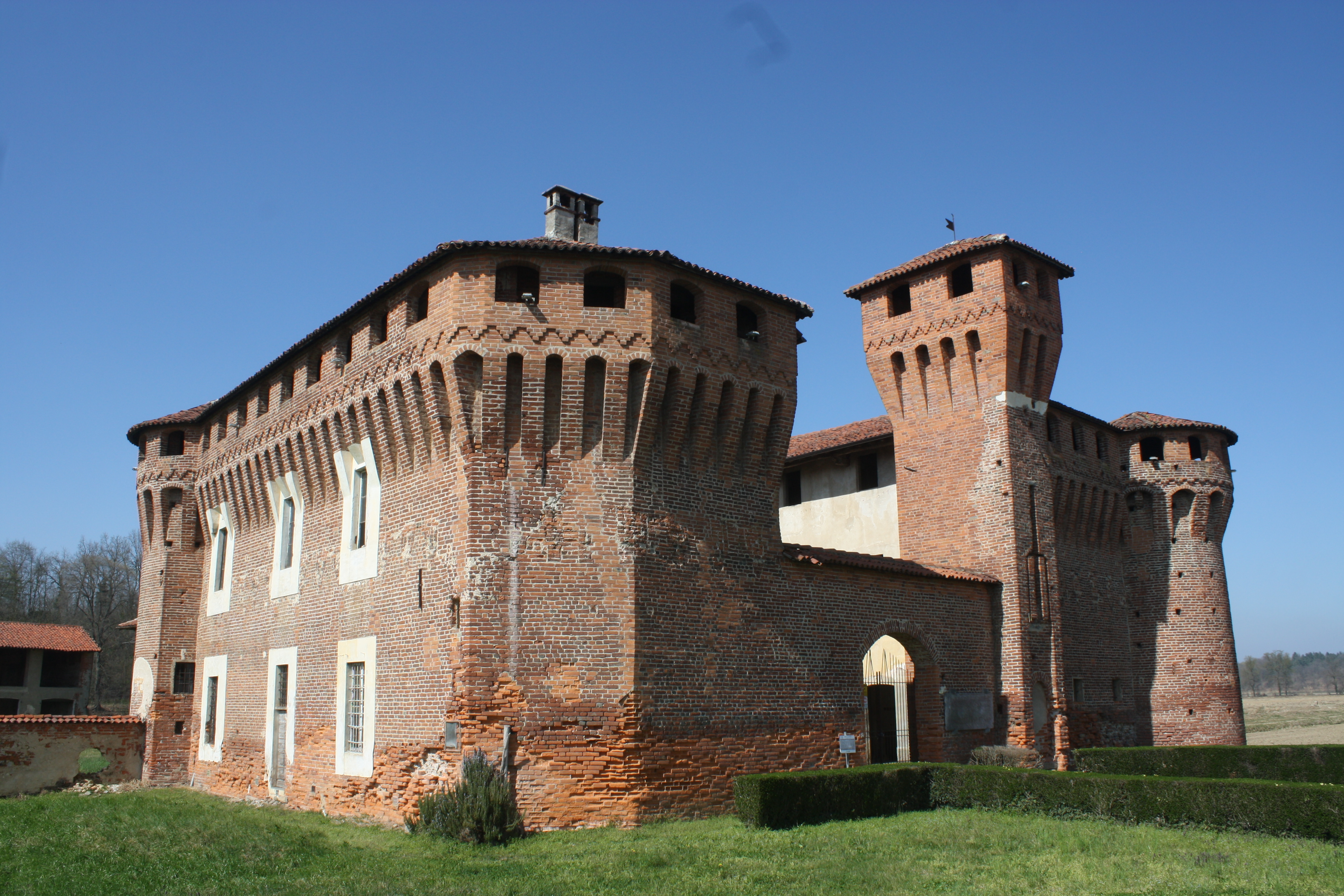

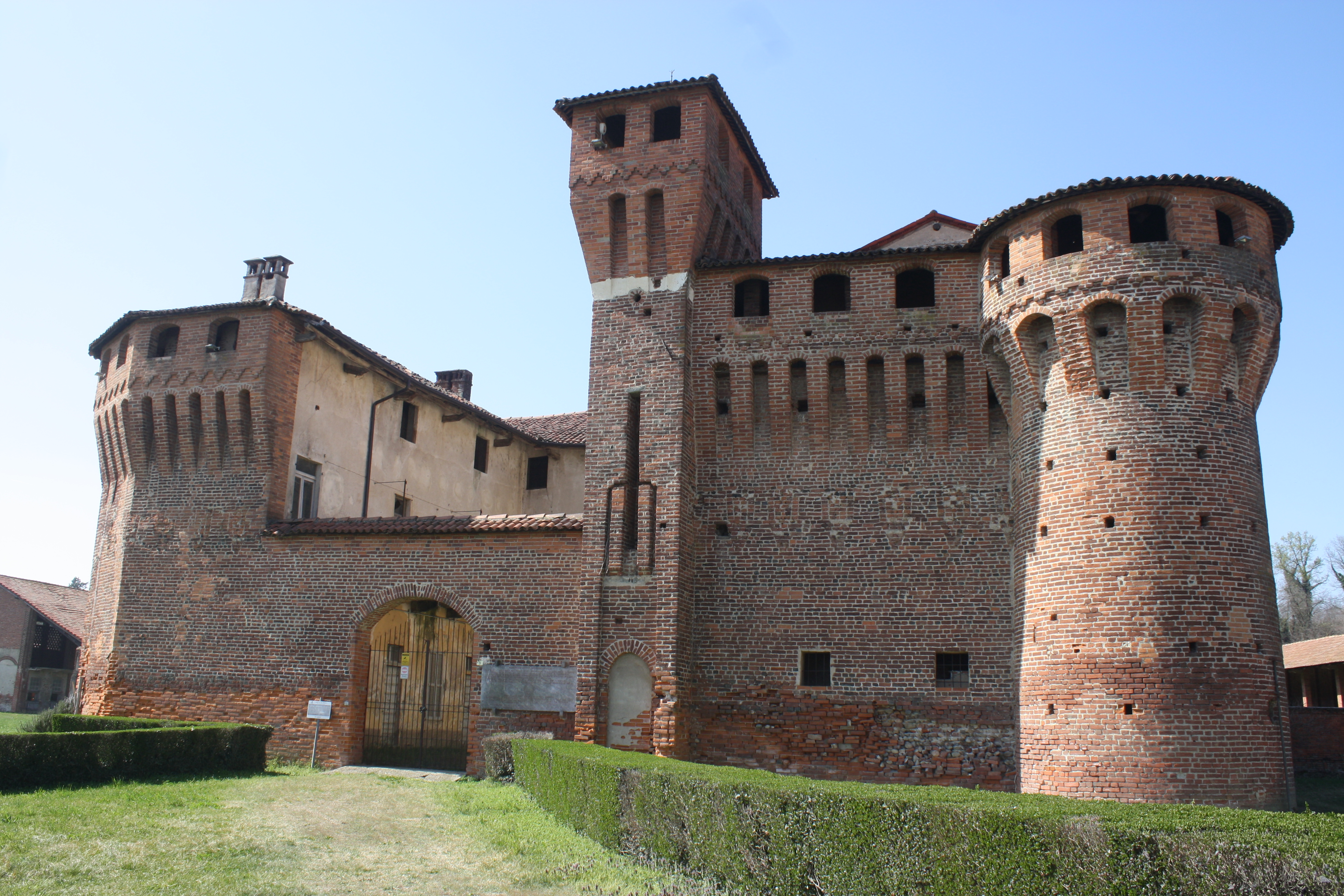
