= Briona =

- Comune
- Comune di Briona
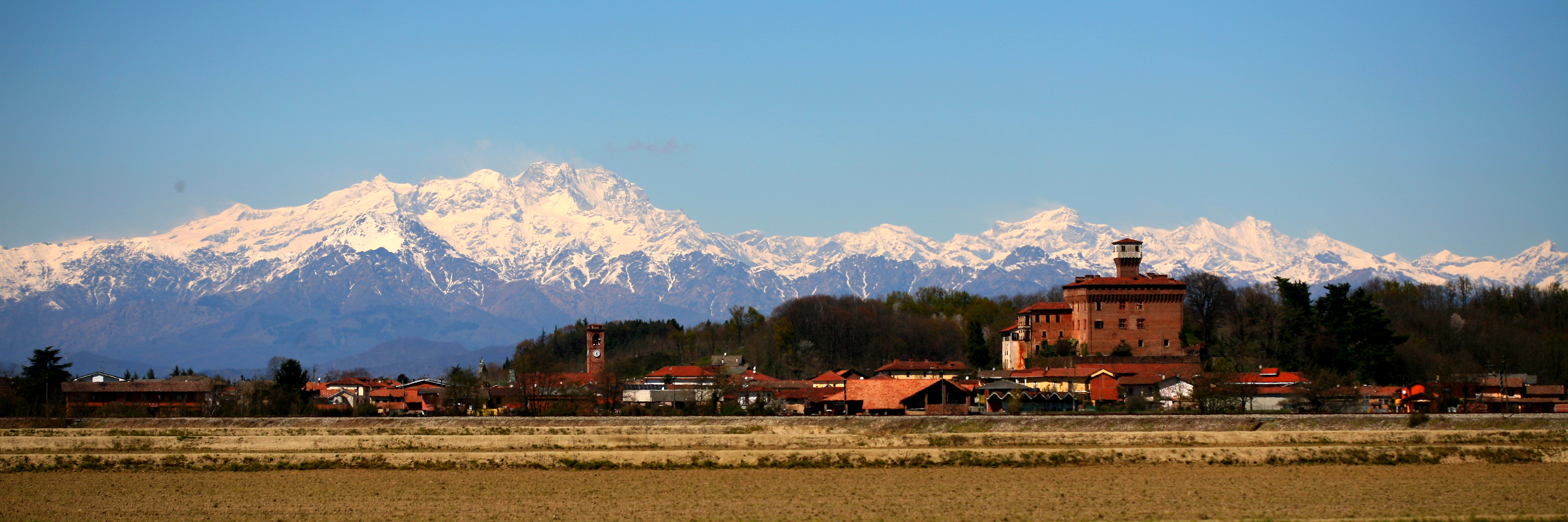
- View of Briona

- Location within Italy Location within Piedmont
- Coordinates: 45°33′N 8°29′E
- Country: Italy
- Region: Piedmont
- Province: Province of Novara (NO)
- Frazioni: San Bernardino, Proh

Area
  - Total: 24.7 km^{2} (9.5 sq mi)
- Elevation: 205 m (673 ft)

Population (Dec. 2004)
  - Total: 1,196
  - Density: 48.4/km^{2} (125/sq mi)
- Time zone: UTC+1 (CET)
  - Summer (DST): UTC+2 (CEST)
- Postal code: 28072
- Dialing code: 0321
- Website: Official website

Briona is a comune (municipality) in the Province of Novara in the Italian region Piedmont, located about 80 kilometres (50 mi) northeast of Turin and about 15 kilometres (9 mi) northwest of Novara. As of 31 December 2004, it had a population of 1,196 and an area of 24.7 square kilometres (9.5 mi^{2}).

The municipality of Briona contains the frazioni (subdivisions, mainly villages and hamlets) San Bernardino and Proh, where is located a Renaissance castle.

Briona borders the following municipalities: Barengo, Caltignaga, Carpignano Sesia, Casaleggio Novara, Castellazzo Novarese, Fara Novarese, Momo, San Pietro Mosezzo, and Sillavengo.

== Demographic evolution ==
Historical population

Year	Pop.	±%
1861	1,025	—
1871	1,123	+9.6%
1881	1,157	+3.0%
1901	1,347	+16.4%
1911	1,241	−7.9%

Year	Pop.	±%
1921	1,358	+9.4%
1931	1,264	−6.9%
1936	1,319	+4.4%
1951	1,499	+13.6%
1961	1,524	+1.7%

Year	Pop.	±%
1971	1,368	−10.2%
1981	1,246	−8.9%
1991	1,117	−10.4%
2001	1,133	+1.4%

Source: Data from ISTAT
