= Sillavengo =

- Comune
- Comune di Sillavengo
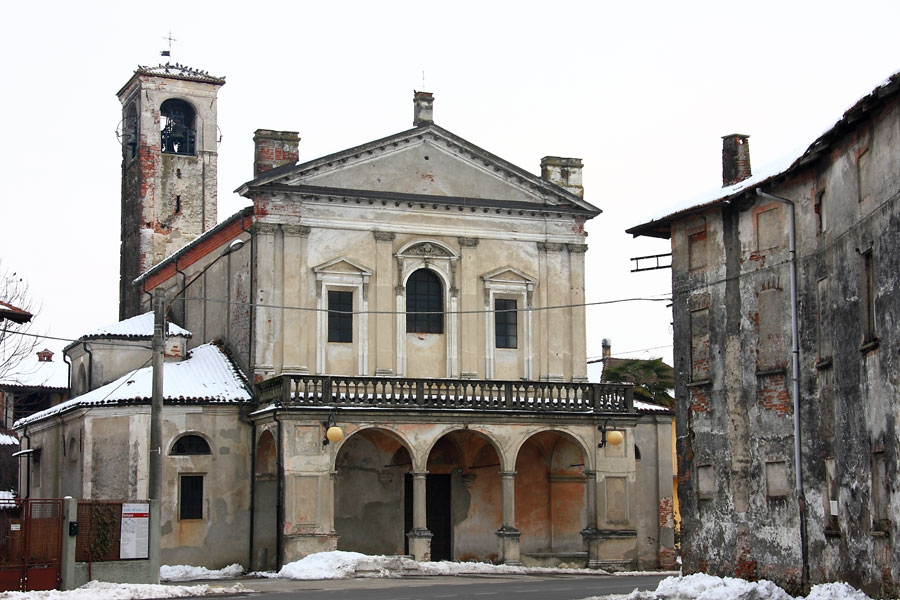
- Church in Sillavengo

- Location within Italy Location within Piedmont
- Coordinates: 45°31′N 8°26′E
- Country: Italy
- Region: Piedmont
- Province: Novara (NO)

Government
  - Mayor: Bruno Locatelli

Area
  - Total: 9.5 km^{2} (3.7 sq mi)
- Elevation: 192 m (630 ft)

Population (Dec. 2004)
  - Total: 579
  - Density: 61/km^{2} (160/sq mi)
- Demonym: Sillavenghesi
- Time zone: UTC+1 (CET)
  - Summer (DST): UTC+2 (CEST)
- Postal code: 28060
- Dialing code: 0321
- Website: Official website

Sillavengo is a comune (municipality) in the Province of Novara in the Italian region of Piedmont, located about 80 kilometres (50 mi) northeast of Turin and about 15 kilometres (9 mi) northwest of Novara.

Sillavengo borders the following municipalities: Arborio, Briona, Carpignano Sesia, Castellazzo Novarese, Ghislarengo, Landiona, and Mandello Vitta.
