= Caltignaga =

- Comune
- Comune di Caltignaga
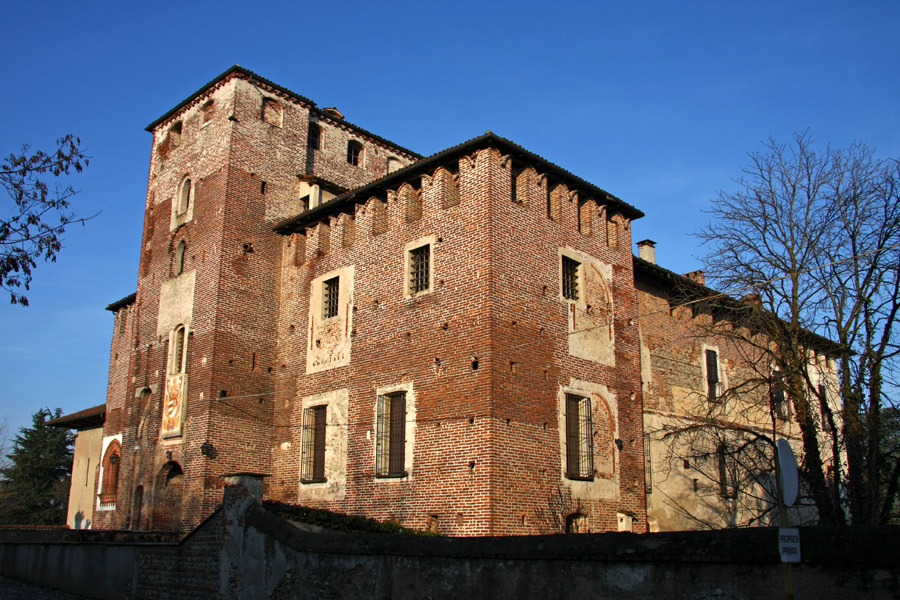
- Castle of Caltignaga, Caltignaga

- Location within Italy Location within Piedmont
- Coordinates: 45°31′N 8°35′E
- Country: Italy
- Region: Piedmont
- Province: Novara (NO)
- Frazioni: Morghengo, Sologno

Government
  - Mayor: Pietro Antonio Miglio

Area
  - Total: 22.32 km^{2} (8.62 sq mi)
- Elevation: 179 m (587 ft)

Population (Dec. 2004)
  - Total: 2,447
  - Density: 109.6/km^{2} (283.9/sq mi)
- Demonym: Caltignaghesi
- Time zone: UTC+1 (CET)
  - Summer (DST): UTC+2 (CEST)
- Postal code: 28010
- Dialing code: 0321
- Website: Official website

Caltignaga is a comune (municipality) in the Province of Novara in the Italian region Piedmont, located about 90 kilometres (56 mi) northeast of Turin and about 8 kilometres (5.0 mi) northwest of Novara.

Caltignaga borders the following municipalities: Bellinzago Novarese, Briona, Cameri, Momo, Novara, and San Pietro Mosezzo.

== Main sights ==
- Parish church of Santa Maria Assunta (11th-12th centuries)
- Castle (14th-17th centuries)
- Oratory of Santi Nazzaro e Celso, in the frazione of Sologno (11th century). It is an example of Romanesque architecture housing, in the interior, mid-15th centuries frescoes by Giovanni da Campo and others. They depict stories of the legendary lives of Nazarius and Celsus.
- Remains of a Roman aqueduct
