= Armeno =

- Comune
- Comune di Armeno
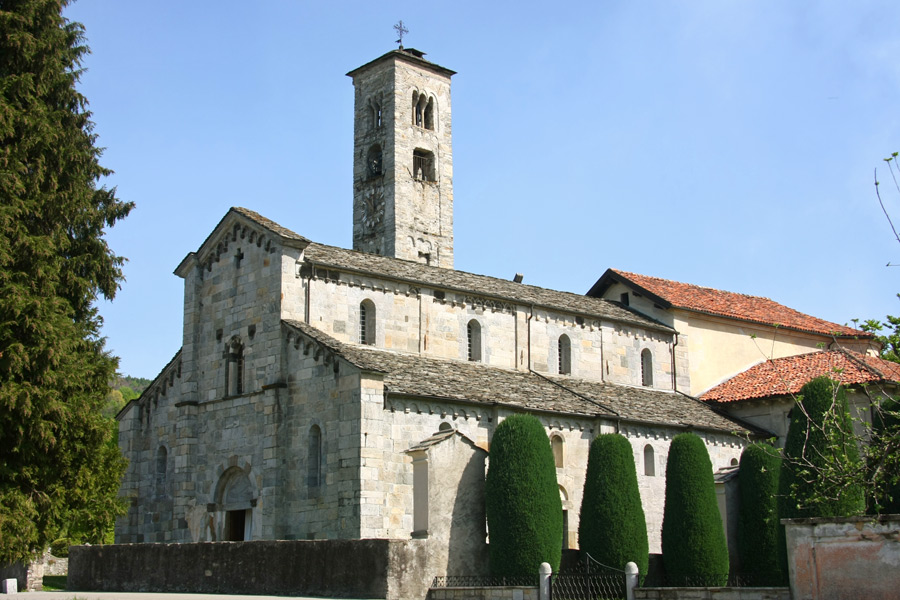
- Church in Armeno

- Location within Italy Location within Piedmont
- Coordinates: 45°49′N 8°27′E
- Country: Italy
- Region: Piedmont
- Province: Province of Novara (NO)
- Frazioni: Sovazza, Coiromonte, Bàssola, Chéggino

Government
  - Mayor: Lavarini Mara

Area
  - Total: 31.6 km^{2} (12.2 sq mi)
- Elevation: 523 m (1,716 ft)

Population (Dec. 2004)
  - Total: 2,229
  - Density: 70.5/km^{2} (183/sq mi)
- Demonym: Armeniesi
- Time zone: UTC+1 (CET)
  - Summer (DST): UTC+2 (CEST)
- Postal code: 28011
- Dialing code: 0322
- Patron saint: Assumption of Mary
- Saint day: 15 August
- Website: Official website

Coiromonte

Armeno (Piedmontese and Lombard: Armagn) is a comune (municipality) in the Province of Novara in the Italian region of Piedmont, located about 100 kilometres (62 mi) northeast of Turin and about 45 kilometres (28 mi) northwest of Novara.

Armeno borders the following municipalities: Ameno, Brovello-Carpugnino, Colazza, Gignese, Massino Visconti, Miasino, Nebbiuno, Omegna, Pettenasco and Pisano.
