= Pisano, Piedmont =

Pisano
- Comune
- Comune di Pisano
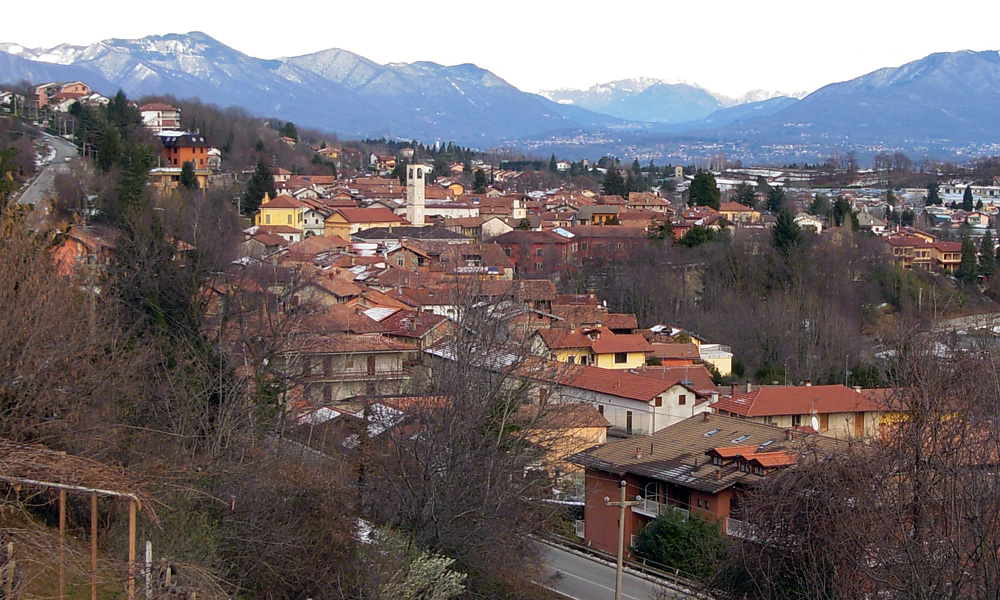
- View of Pisano

- Location within Italy Location within Piedmont
- Coordinates: 45°47′N 8°30′E
- Country: Italy
- Region: Piedmont
- Province: Novara (NO)

Government
  - Mayor: Valeria Pastore

Area
  - Total: 2.8 km^{2} (1.1 sq mi)
- Elevation: 396 m (1,299 ft)

Population (Dec. 2004)
  - Total: 816
  - Density: 290/km^{2} (750/sq mi)
- Demonym: Pisanesi
- Time zone: UTC+1 (CET)
  - Summer (DST): UTC+2 (CEST)
- Postal code: 28010
- Dialing code: 0322
- Website: Official website

Pisano is a small town (municipality) in the Province of Novara in the Italian region of Piedmont, located about 100 kilometres (62 mi) northeast of Turin and about 40 kilometres (25 mi) north of Novara.

Pisano borders the following municipalities: Armeno, Colazza, Meina, and Nebbiuno.

== Geography and climate ==
The municipality of Pisano is located at 396 m of altitude, on the side of the Alto Vergante hill. The territory has many woods, meadows and small rivers. At the foot of the hill, there are farmhouses with greenhouses.

The climate, heavily influenced by Lake Maggiore, is characterised by warm winters and fresh summers. Autumn and Spring are typically rainy.

== Main sights ==
=== Church of Sant'Eusebio ===
The parish church, situated at the centre of the village, is dedicated to Saint Eusebio, Vercelli's bishop in the 4th century, and the Maccabees. It was extended during the 17th century. On the porch is a large mural representing the Virgin of Mercy.

The plan is on a Latin cross with three chapels; the first contains the baptismal font; the second, located behind the pulpit, has an altar dedicated to the Lady of the Rosary, with statues of Saint Sebastian and Saint Roch at each side. These saints were anciently prayed to protect the village from epidemics. The third chapel is now dedicated to Saint Eusebius.

=== Oratory of Sette Allegrezze ===
The small oratory is dedicated to the Madonna of Sette Dolori and of Sette Allegrezze.

It is located on the side of the small stream of Rio della Madonna. It was built prior to the 16th century.

The most important fresco represents the Virgin Mary with her son on her right arm, while the other hand is holding the Holy bible; above the group is a white dove, symbolizing the Holy Spirit.

The building was repaired in the 20th century.

The church has a bell tower, which includes the remains of an older church.
