= Colazza =

- Comune
- Comune di Colazza
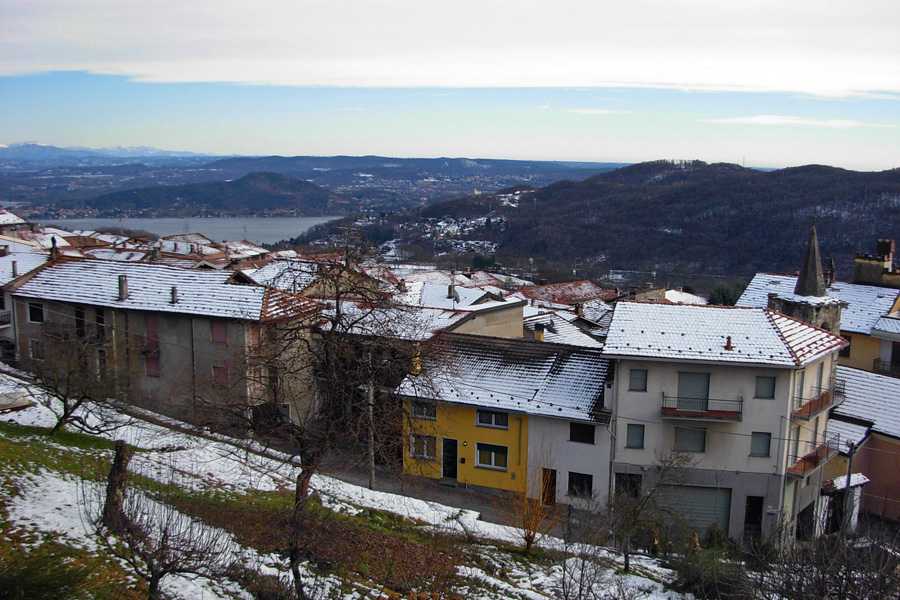
- Panorama of the village

- Location within Italy Location within Piedmont
- Coordinates: 45°47′N 8°30′E
- Country: Italy
- Region: Piedmont
- Province: Province of Novara (NO)

Area
  - Total: 3.1 km^{2} (1.2 sq mi)

Population (Dec. 2004)
  - Total: 443
  - Density: 140/km^{2} (370/sq mi)
- Demonym: Colazzesi
- Time zone: UTC+1 (CET)
  - Summer (DST): UTC+2 (CEST)
- Postal code: 28010
- Dialing code: 0322

Colazza is a comune (municipality) in the Province of Novara in the Italian region of Piedmont, located about 100 kilometres (62 mi) northeast of Turin and about 40 kilometres (25 mi) north of Novara. As of 31 December 2004, it had a population of 443 and an area of 3.1 square kilometres (1.2 mi^{2}).

Colazza borders the following municipalities: Ameno, Armeno, Invorio, Meina, and Pisano.

== Demographic evolution ==
Historical population

Year	Pop.	±%
1861	535	—
1871	538	+0.6%
1881	568	+5.6%
1901	592	+4.2%
1911	619	+4.6%

Year	Pop.	±%
1921	507	−18.1%
1931	473	−6.7%
1936	399	−15.6%
1951	388	−2.8%
1961	381	−1.8%

Year	Pop.	±%
1971	364	−4.5%
1981	406	+11.5%
1991	417	+2.7%
2001	416	−0.2%

Source: Data from ISTAT
