= Landiona =

- Comune
- Comune di Landiona
- Location within Italy Location within Piedmont
- Coordinates: 45°30′N 8°25′E
- Country: Italy
- Region: Piedmont
- Province: Province of Novara (NO)

Area
  - Total: 7.3 km^{2} (2.8 sq mi)

Population (Dec. 2004)
  - Total: 600
  - Density: 82/km^{2} (210/sq mi)
- Time zone: UTC+1 (CET)
  - Summer (DST): UTC+2 (CEST)
- Postal code: 28060
- Dialing code: 0321
- Website: Official website

Landiona is a comune (municipality) in the Province of Novara in the Italian region Piedmont, located about 70 kilometres (43 mi) northeast of Turin and about 15 kilometres (9 mi) northwest of Novara. As of 31 December 2004, it had a population of 600 and an area of 7.3 square kilometres (2.8 mi^{2}).

Landiona borders the following municipalities: Arborio, Mandello Vitta, Sillavengo, and Vicolungo.

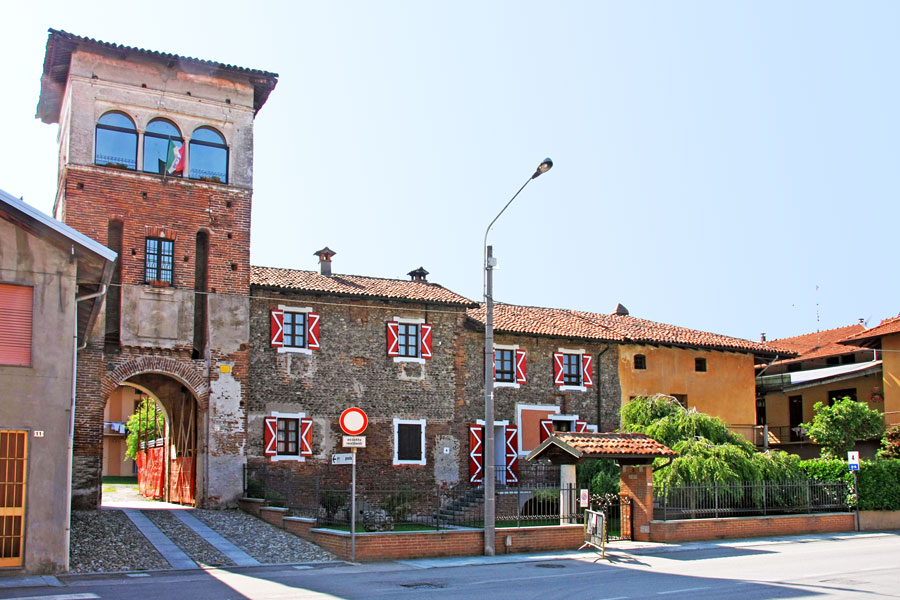
Landiona castello

== Demographic evolution ==
Historical population

Year	Pop.	±%
1861	750	—
1871	769	+2.5%
1881	894	+16.3%
1901	1,016	+13.6%
1911	1,097	+8.0%

Year	Pop.	±%
1921	1,031	−6.0%
1931	949	−8.0%
1936	962	+1.4%
1951	872	−9.4%
1961	719	−17.5%

Year	Pop.	±%
1971	621	−13.6%
1981	628	+1.1%
1991	633	+0.8%
2001	587	−7.3%

Source: Data from ISTAT
