= Castellazzo Novarese =

- Comune
- Comune di Castellazzo Novarese
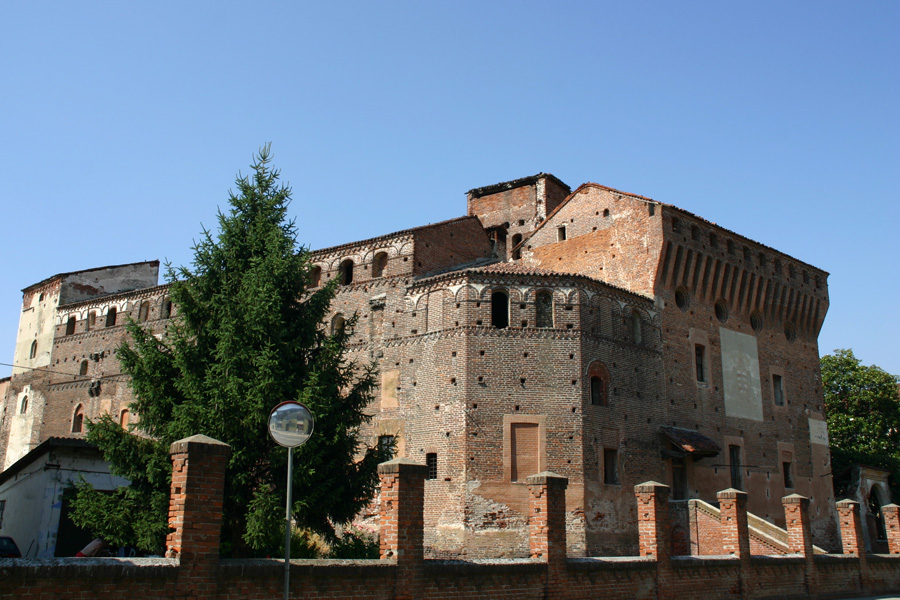
- Castle of Castellazzo Novarese

- Location within Italy Location within Piedmont
- Coordinates: 45°31′N 8°30′E
- Country: Italy
- Region: Piedmont
- Province: Novara (NO)

Government
  - Mayor: Claudio Rossini

Area
  - Total: 10.8 km^{2} (4.2 sq mi)
- Elevation: 182 m (597 ft)

Population (Dec. 2004)
  - Total: 288
  - Density: 26.7/km^{2} (69.1/sq mi)
- Demonym: Castellazzesi
- Time zone: UTC+1 (CET)
  - Summer (DST): UTC+2 (CEST)
- Postal code: 28060
- Dialing code: 0321
- Website: Official website

Castellazzo Novarese is a comune (municipality) in the Province of Novara in the Italian region Piedmont, located about 80 kilometres (50 mi) northeast of Turin and about 12 kilometres (7 mi) northwest of Novara.

Castellazzo Novarese borders the following municipalities: Briona, Casaleggio Novara, Mandello Vitta, and Sillavengo.
