= Divignano =

- Comune
- Comune di Divignano
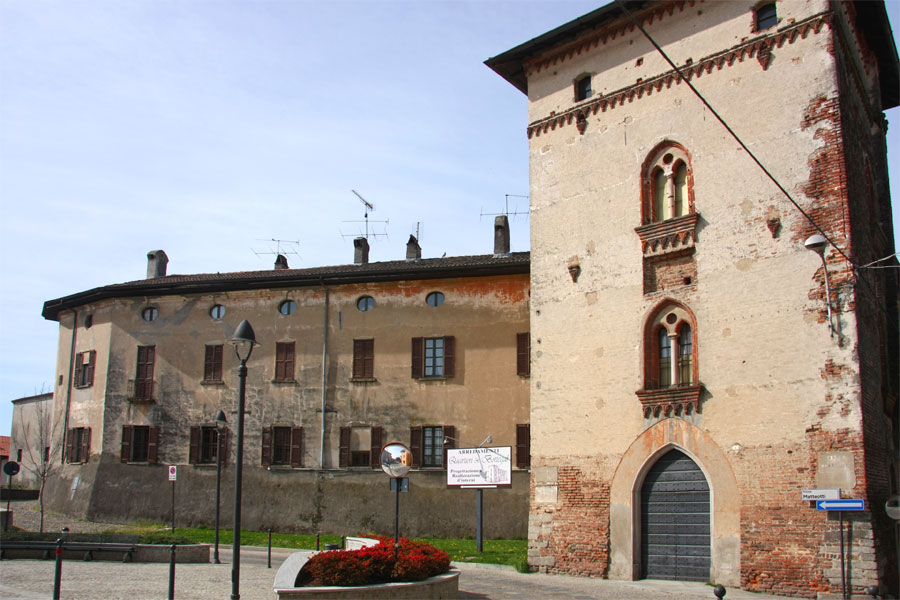
- Castle of Divignano

- Location within Italy Location within Piedmont
- Coordinates: 45°40′N 8°36′E
- Country: Italy
- Region: Piedmont
- Province: Novara (NO)

Government
  - Mayor: Luciano Carlana

Area
  - Total: 5.1 km^{2} (2.0 sq mi)
- Elevation: 337 m (1,106 ft)

Population (Dec. 2004)
  - Total: 1,317
  - Density: 260/km^{2} (670/sq mi)
- Demonym: Divignanesi
- Time zone: UTC+1 (CET)
  - Summer (DST): UTC+2 (CEST)
- Postal code: 28010
- Dialing code: 0321
- Website: Official website

Divignano is a comune (municipality) in the Province of Novara in the Italian region Piedmont, located about 100 kilometres (62 mi) northeast of Turin and about 25 kilometres (16 mi) north of Novara.

Divignano borders the following municipalities: Agrate Conturbia, Borgo Ticino, Marano Ticino, Mezzomerico, Pombia, and Varallo Pombia.
