= Dormelletto =

- Comune
- Comune di Dormelletto
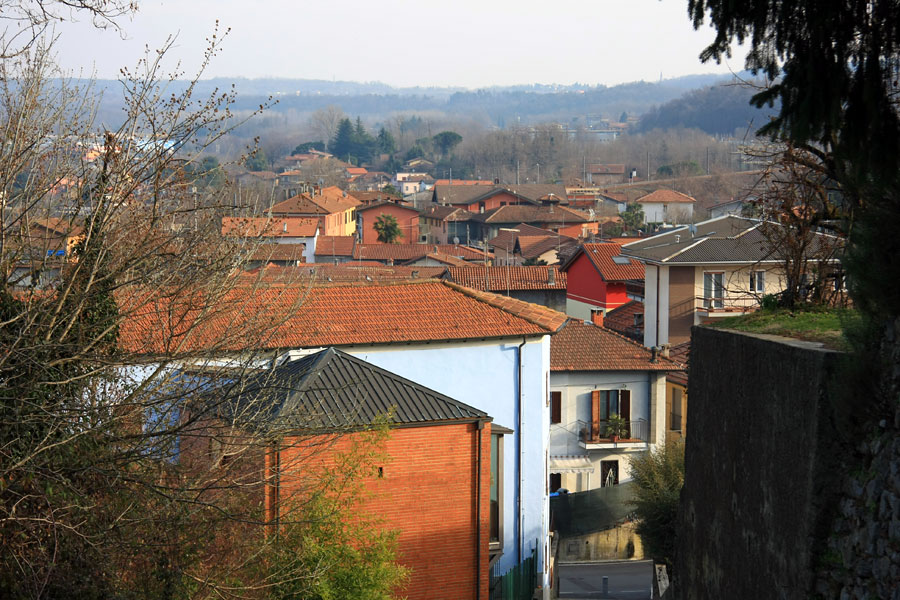
- View of Dormelletto

- Location within Italy Location within Piedmont
- Coordinates: 45°44′N 8°34′E
- Country: Italy
- Region: Piedmont
- Province: Province of Novara (NO)

Area
  - Total: 7.0 km^{2} (2.7 sq mi)
- Elevation: 236 m (774 ft)

Population (Dec. 2018)
  - Total: 2,600
  - Density: 370/km^{2} (960/sq mi)
- Demonym: Dormellettesi
- Time zone: UTC+1 (CET)
  - Summer (DST): UTC+2 (CEST)
- Postal code: 28040
- Dialing code: 0322
- Website: Official website

Dormelletto is a comune (municipality) in the Province of Novara in the Italian region of Piedmont, located about 100 kilometres (62 mi) northeast of Turin and about 30 kilometres (19 mi) north of Novara. As of 31 December 2018, it had a population of 2,600 and an area of 7.0 square kilometres (2.7 mi^{2}).

Dormelletto borders the following municipalities: Angera, Arona, Castelletto sopra Ticino, Comignago, and Sesto Calende.

== Demographic evolution ==
Historical population

Year	Pop.	±%
1861	674	—
1871	735	+9.1%
1881	913	+24.2%
1901	951	+4.2%
1911	1,016	+6.8%

Year	Pop.	±%
1921	1,005	−1.1%
1931	1,005	+0.0%
1936	944	−6.1%
1951	1,148	+21.6%
1961	1,307	+13.9%

Year	Pop.	±%
1971	2,248	+72.0%
1981	2,518	+12.0%
1991	2,593	+3.0%
2001	2,482	−4.3%

Source: Data from ISTAT
