= Borgo Ticino =

Comune in Piedmont, Italy

- Comune
- Comune di Borgo Ticino
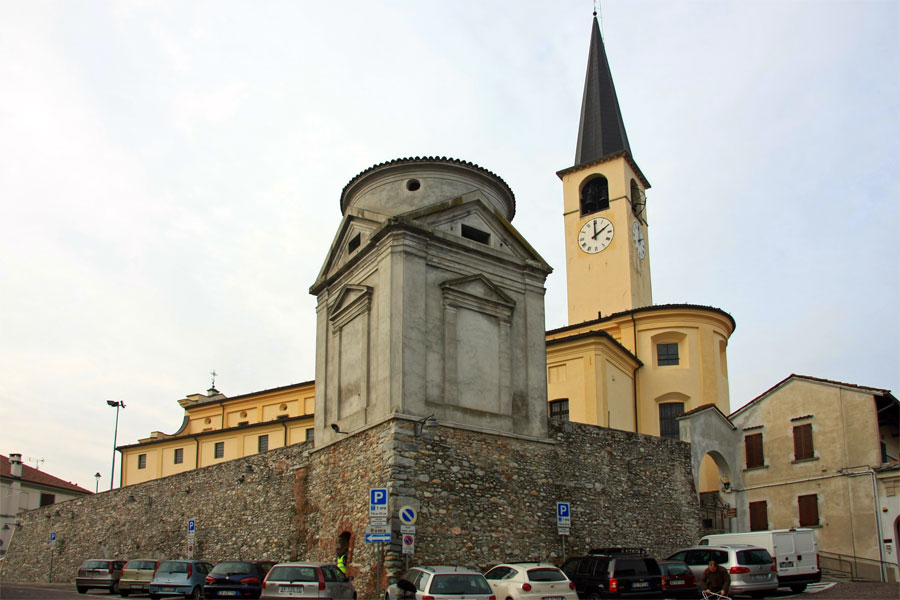
- View of Borgo Ticino

- Location within Italy Location within Piedmont
- Coordinates: 45°41′N 8°36′E
- Country: Italy
- Region: Piedmont
- Province: Novara (NO)
- Frazioni: Gagnago, Campagnola

Government
  - Mayor: Alessandro Marchese

Area
  - Total: 13.3 km^{2} (5.1 sq mi)
- Elevation: 324 m (1,063 ft)

Population (Dec. 2018)
  - Total: 5,089
  - Density: 383/km^{2} (991/sq mi)
- Demonym: Borgoticinesi
- Time zone: UTC+1 (CET)
  - Summer (DST): UTC+2 (CEST)
- Postal code: 28040
- Dialing code: 0321
- Website: Official website

Borgo Ticino (Piedmontese: Borgh Tisén, Lombard: Burgh Tisin) is a comune (municipality) in the Province of Novara in the Italian region of Piedmont, located about 100 kilometres (62 mi) northeast of Turin and about 25 kilometres (16 mi) north of Novara.

Borgo Ticino borders the following municipalities: Agrate Conturbia, Castelletto sopra Ticino, Comignago, Divignano, Varallo Pombia, and Veruno.
