= Varallo Pombia =

- Comune
- Comune di Varallo Pombia
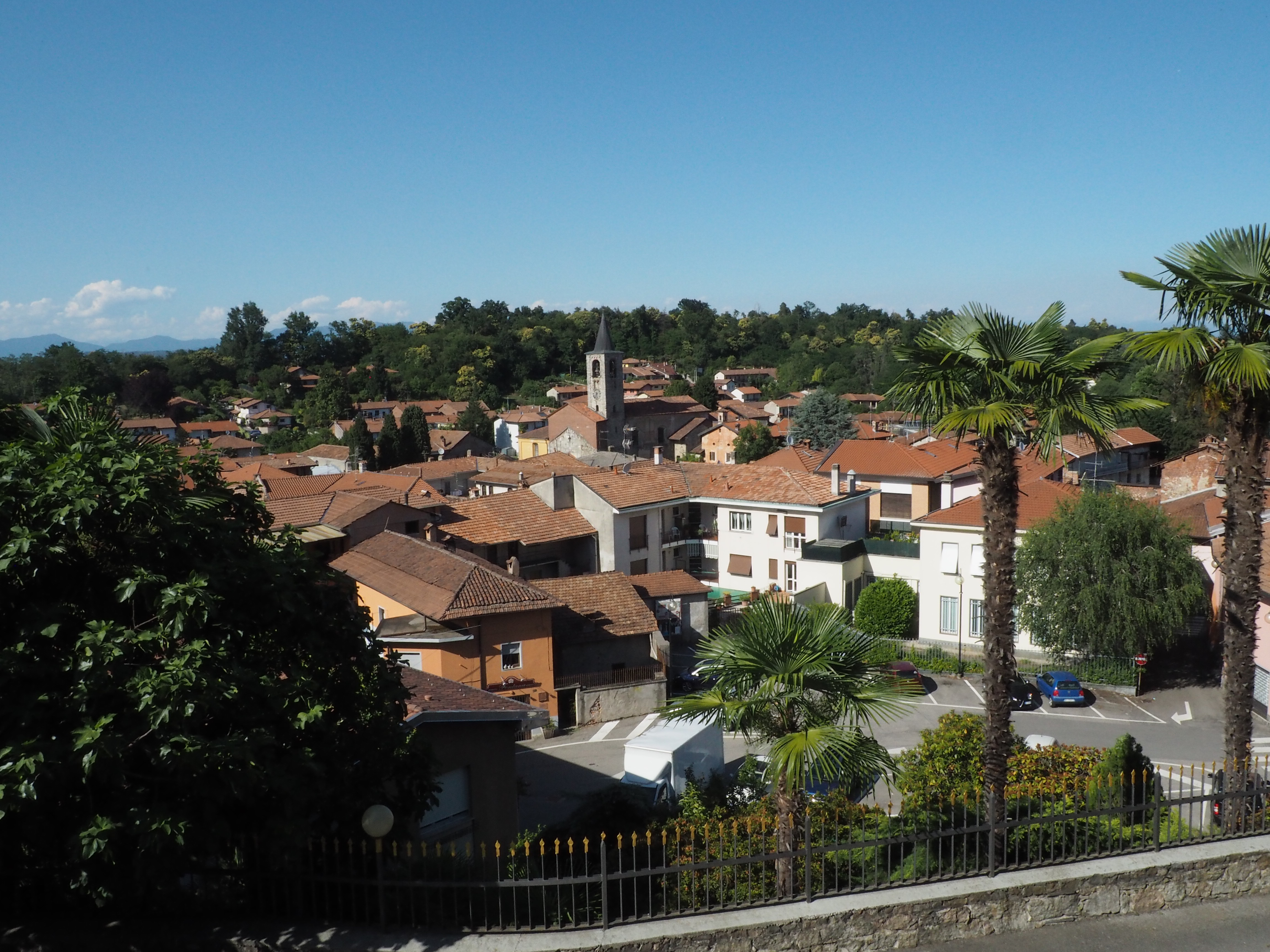
- View of Varallo Pombia

- Location within Italy Location within Piedmont
- Coordinates: 45°40′N 8°38′E
- Country: Italy
- Region: Piedmont
- Province: Province of Novara (NO)
- Frazioni: Cascinetta

Area
  - Total: 13.6 km^{2} (5.3 sq mi)
- Elevation: 300 m (980 ft)

Population (Dec. 2020)
  - Total: 4,841
  - Density: 356/km^{2} (922/sq mi)
- Time zone: UTC+1 (CET)
  - Summer (DST): UTC+2 (CEST)
- Postal code: 28040
- Dialing code: 011

Varallo Pombia is a comune (municipality) in the Province of Novara in the Italian region Piedmont (Piemonte), located about 100 kilometres (62 mi) northeast of Turin and about 25 kilometres (16 mi) north of Novara. As of 31 December 2004, it had a population of 4,598 and an area of 13.6 square kilometres (5.3 mi^{2}).

Varallo Pombia borders the following municipalities: Borgo Ticino, Castelletto sopra Ticino, Divignano, Pombia, and Somma Lombardo.

== Demographic evolution ==
Historical population

Year	Pop.	±%
1861	2,722	—
1871	3,059	+12.4%
1881	3,188	+4.2%
1901	3,367	+5.6%
1911	3,255	−3.3%

Year	Pop.	±%
1921	3,003	−7.7%
1931	2,656	−11.6%
1936	2,526	−4.9%
1951	2,712	+7.4%
1961	3,287	+21.2%

Year	Pop.	±%
1971	3,817	+16.1%
1981	4,024	+5.4%
1991	4,107	+2.1%
2001	4,403	+7.2%

Source: Data from ISTAT

== Twin towns ==
Varallo Pombia is twinned with:

- Thionville, France
- Acciano, Italy
