= Pettenasco =

- Comune
- Comune di Pettenasco
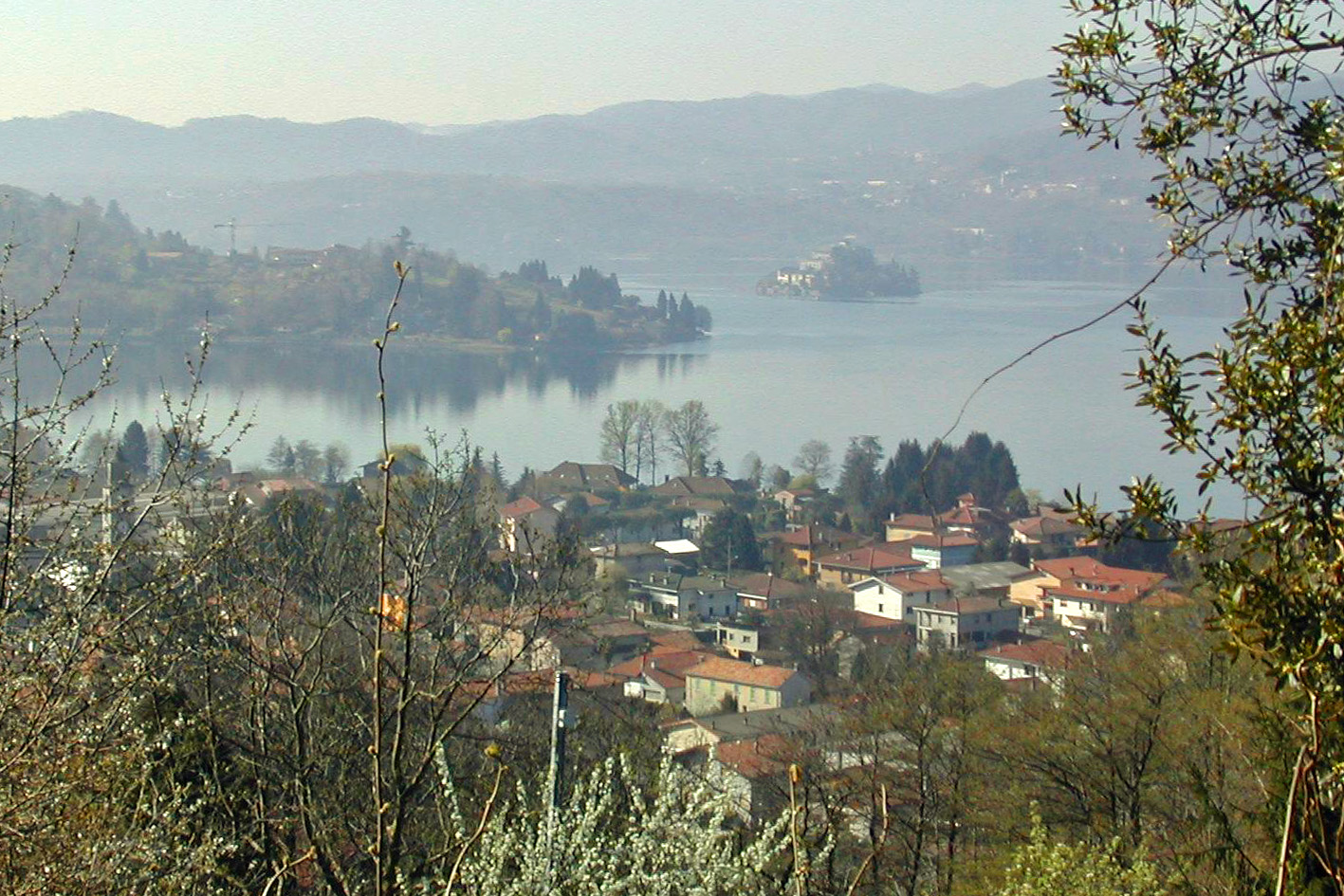
- View of Pettenasco

- Location within Italy Location within Piedmont
- Coordinates: 45°48′N 8°25′E
- Country: Italy
- Region: Piedmont
- Province: Province of Novara (NO)
- Frazioni: Pratolungo, Crabbia, Poggio Luneglio

Area
  - Total: 7.1 km^{2} (2.7 sq mi)

Population (Dec. 2004)
  - Total: 1,318
  - Density: 190/km^{2} (480/sq mi)
- Demonym: Pettenaschesi
- Time zone: UTC+1 (CET)
  - Summer (DST): UTC+2 (CEST)
- Postal code: 28028
- Dialing code: 0323
- Website: Official website

Pettenasco is a comune (municipality) in the Province of Novara in the Italian region of Piedmont, located about 100 kilometres (62 mi) northeast of Turin and about 40 kilometres (25 mi) northwest of Novara. It lies on the eastern shore of Lake Orta.

As of 31 December 2004, it had a population of 1,318 and an area of 7.1 square kilometres (2.7 mi^{2}).

The municipality of Pettenasco contains the frazioni (subdivisions, mainly villages and hamlets) Pratolungo, Crabbia, and Poggio Luneglio. A daily ferry service connects Pettenasco with Omegna and towns and villages around the lake.

Pettenasco borders the following municipalities: Armeno, Miasino, Omegna and Orta San Giulio.

== Demographic evolution ==
Historical population

Year	Pop.	±%
1861	855	—
1871	811	−5.1%
1881	876	+8.0%
1901	978	+11.6%
1911	945	−3.4%

Year	Pop.	±%
1921	939	−0.6%
1931	930	−1.0%
1936	905	−2.7%
1951	1,046	+15.6%
1961	1,122	+7.3%

Year	Pop.	±%
1971	1,130	+0.7%
1981	1,153	+2.0%
1991	1,218	+5.6%
2001	1,310	+7.6%

Source: Data from ISTAT
