= Bolzano Novarese =

- Comune
- Comune di Bolzano Novarese
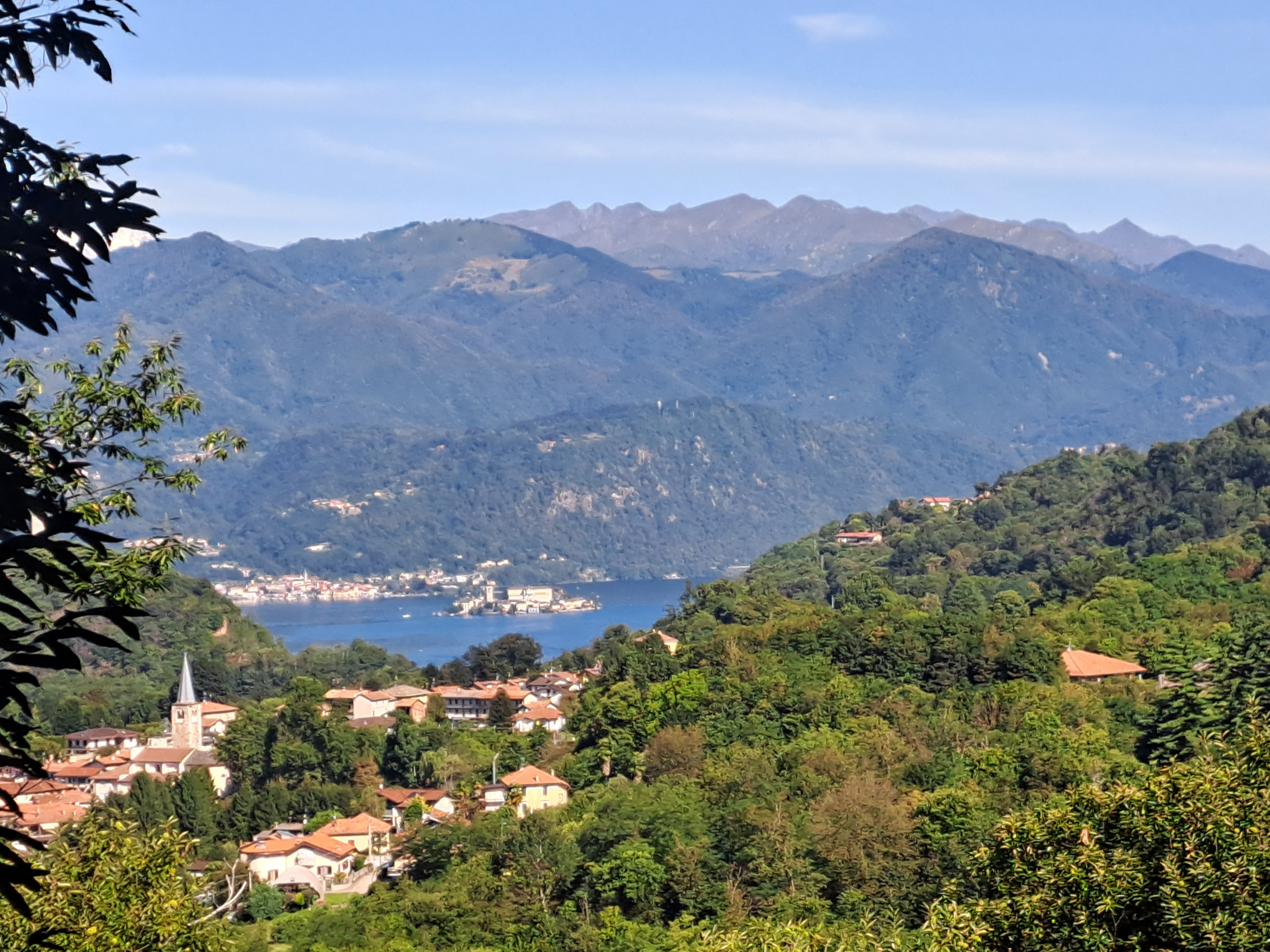
- Southeast panoramic view

- Location within Italy Location within Piedmont
- Coordinates: 45°46′N 8°27′E
- Country: Italy
- Region: Piedmont
- Province: Novara (NO)

Government
  - Mayor: Ettore Franzosi

Area
  - Total: 3.3 km^{2} (1.3 sq mi)
- Elevation: 420 m (1,380 ft)

Population (Jul.15)
  - Total: 1,185
  - Density: 360/km^{2} (930/sq mi)
- Demonym: Bolzanesi
- Time zone: UTC+1 (CET)
  - Summer (DST): UTC+2 (CEST)
- Postal code: 28010
- Dialing code: 0322
- Website: Official website

Bolzano Novarese (Piedmontese: Bolsan, Lombard: Bulzan) is a comune (municipality) in the Province of Novara in the Italian region of Piedmont, located about 100 kilometres (62 mi) northeast of Turin and about 40 kilometres (25 mi) northwest of Novara.

Bolzano Novarese borders the following municipalities: Ameno, Gozzano, Invorio, and Orta San Giulio.

== People ==
- The Italian ski mountaineer Carlo Battel was born in Bolzano on May 6, 1972.
