= Briga Novarese =

- Comune
- Comune di Briga Novarese
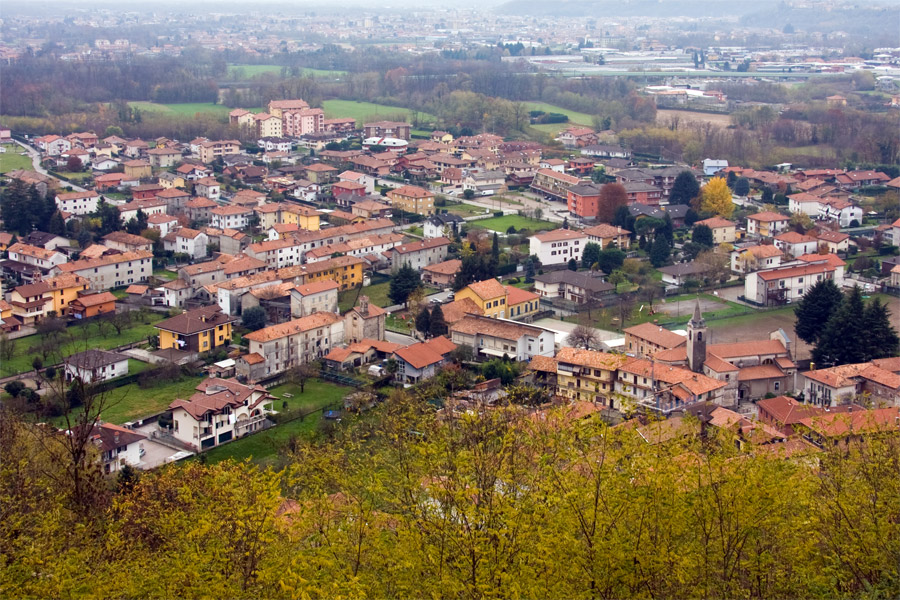
- View of Briga Novarese

- Location within Italy Location within Piedmont
- Coordinates: 45°44′N 8°27′E
- Country: Italy
- Region: Piedmont
- Province: Novara (NO)

Government
  - Mayor: Chiara Barbieri

Area
  - Total: 4.7 km^{2} (1.8 sq mi)
- Elevation: 345 m (1,132 ft)

Population (Dec. 2017)
  - Total: 2,865
  - Density: 610/km^{2} (1,600/sq mi)
- Demonym: Brighesi
- Time zone: UTC+1 (CET)
  - Summer (DST): UTC+2 (CEST)
- Postal code: 28010
- Dialing code: 0322
- Website: Official website

Briga Novarese is a comune (municipality) in the Province of Novara in the Italian region of Piedmont, located about 90 kilometres (56 mi) northeast of Turin and about 35 kilometres (22 mi) northwest of Novara.

Briga Novarese borders the following municipalities: Borgomanero, Gozzano, and Invorio.
