= Province of Novara =

Province of Italy, located in the Piedmont region

Coordinates: 45°27′N 8°37′E

Province of Novara Provincia di Novara (Italian) Provincia ëd Noara (Piedmontese)
- Province
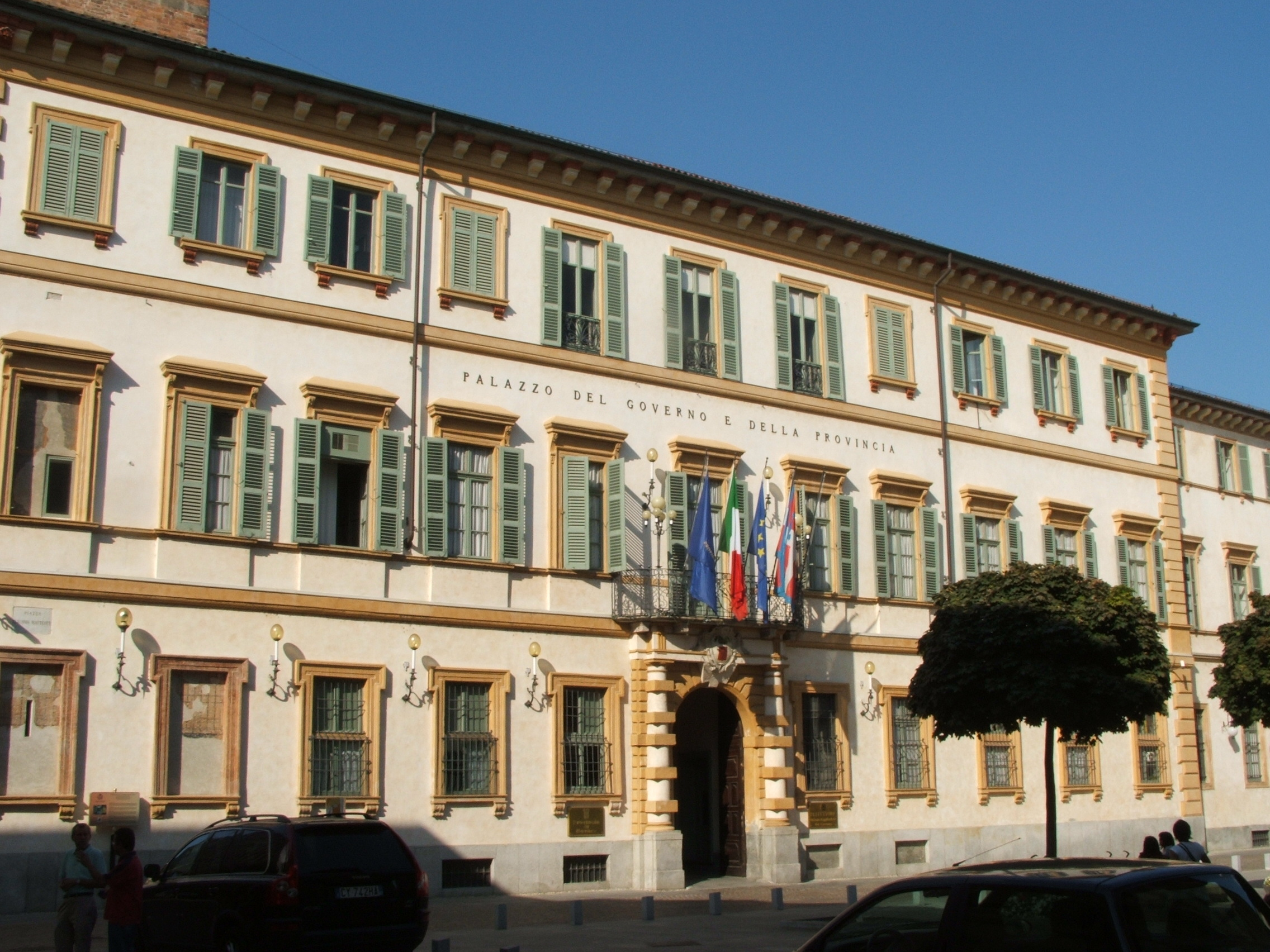
- Palazzo Natta, the seat of the province

- Coat of arms

- Location of the province of Novara in Italy
- Country: Italy
- Region: Piedmont
- Capital(s): Novara
- Municipalities: 87

Government
  - President: Marco Caccia

Area
  - Total: 1,340.28 km^{2} (517.49 sq mi)

Population (2026)
  - Total: 365,930
  - Density: 273.03/km^{2} (707.13/sq mi)

GDP
  - Total: €10.416 billion (2015)
  - Per capita: €28,078 (2015)
- Time zone: UTC+1 (CET)
  - Summer (DST): UTC+2 (CEST)
- Postal code: 28010-28019, 28021, 28024, 28028, 28040-28041, 28043, 28045-28047, 28050, 28053, 28060-28066, 28068-28072, 28074-28075, 28077-28079, 28100
- Telephone prefix: 011, 0161, 0163, 0321, 0322, 0323, 0331
- Vehicle registration: NO
- ISTAT code: 003

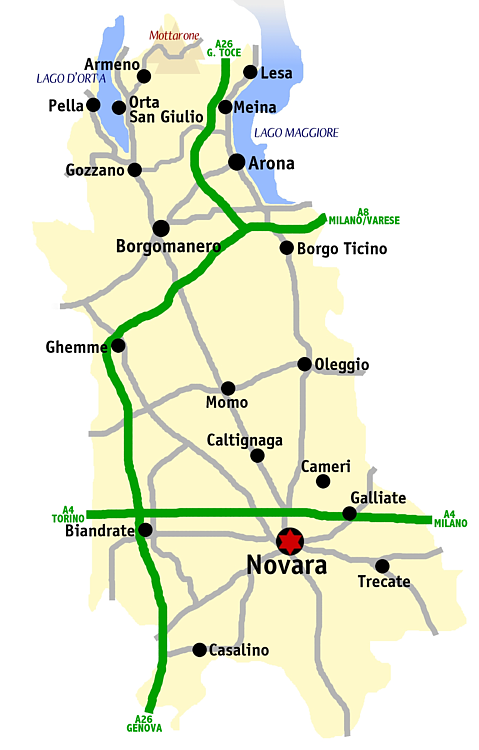
Cities, towns and roads of the province

Map of the municipalities of the province

The Province of Novara (Italian: provincia di Novara, Piedmontese: Provincia ëd Noara) is a province in the region of Piedmont in northern Italy. Its capital is the city of Novara. It has a population of 365,930 in an area of 1,340.28 square kilometres (517.49 mi^{2}) across its 87 municipalities.

In 1992, the new province of Verbano-Cusio-Ossola was created through the fusion of three geographical areas which had previously been part of the province of Novara.

== Municipalities ==
The province has 87 municipalities:

- Agrate Conturbia
- Ameno
- Armeno
- Arona
- Barengo
- Bellinzago Novarese
- Biandrate
- Boca
- Bogogno
- Bolzano Novarese
- Borgo Ticino
- Borgolavezzaro
- Borgomanero
- Briga Novarese
- Briona
- Caltignaga
- Cameri
- Carpignano Sesia
- Casalbeltrame
- Casaleggio Novara
- Casalino
- Casalvolone
- Castellazzo Novarese
- Castelletto Sopra Ticino
- Cavaglietto
- Cavaglio d'Agogna
- Cavallirio
- Cerano
- Colazza
- Comignago
- Cressa
- Cureggio
- Divignano
- Dormelletto
- Fara Novarese
- Fontaneto d'Agogna
- Galliate
- Garbagna Novarese
- Gargallo
- Gattico-Veruno
- Ghemme
- Gozzano
- Granozzo con Monticello
- Grignasco
- Invorio
- Landiona
- Lesa
- Maggiora
- Mandello Vitta
- Marano Ticino
- Massino Visconti
- Meina
- Mezzomerico
- Miasino
- Momo
- Nebbiuno
- Nibbiola
- Novara
- Oleggio
- Oleggio Castello
- Orta San Giulio
- Paruzzaro
- Pella
- Pettenasco
- Pisano
- Pogno
- Pombia
- Prato Sesia
- Recetto
- Romagnano Sesia
- Romentino
- San Maurizio d'Opaglio
- San Nazzaro Sesia
- San Pietro Mosezzo
- Sillavengo
- Sizzano
- Soriso
- Sozzago
- Suno
- Terdobbiate
- Tornaco
- Trecate
- Vaprio d'Agogna
- Varallo Pombia
- Vespolate
- Veruno
- Vicolungo
- Vinzaglio

== Demographics ==
As of 2026, the population is 365,930, of which 49.1% are male, and 50.9% are female. Minors make up 14.4% of the population, and seniors make up 25.6%.

Historical population
(Current borders)

Year	Pop.	±%
1861	192,701	—
1871	210,096	+9.0%
1881	229,244	+9.1%
1901	258,383	+12.7%
1911	273,825	+6.0%
1921	270,618	−1.2%
1931	262,494	−3.0%
1936	262,532	+0.0%

Year	Pop.	±%
1951	274,421	+4.5%
1961	303,481	+10.6%
1971	327,901	+8.0%
1981	337,271	+2.9%
1991	334,614	−0.8%
2001	343,040	+2.5%
2011	365,559	+6.6%
2021	361,916	−1.0%

Source: ISTAT

=== Immigration ===
As of 2025, immigrants make up 14.2% of the population. The 5 largest foreign countries of birth are Albania, Morocco, Ukraine, Romania, and Pakistan.

== Winemaking ==
The province of Novara is home to the Denominazione di origine controllata (DOC) wine of Colline Novaresi which was created in 1994 for the red and white Italian wines of the area. All grapes destined for DOC wine production need to be harvested to a yield no greater than 11 tonnes/ha. The red wine is a blend of at least 30% Nebbiolo (known under the local name of Spanna), up to 40% Uva Rara and no more than 30% collectively of Croatina and Vespolina. Varietal styles of each of the red grape varieties can be made provided that the grape makes up at least 85% of the wine. The white wine is made 100% from the Erbaluce grape. The finished wine must attain a minimum alcohol level of 11% in order to be labelled with the Colline Novaresi DOC designation.

== Transport ==
=== Motorways ===
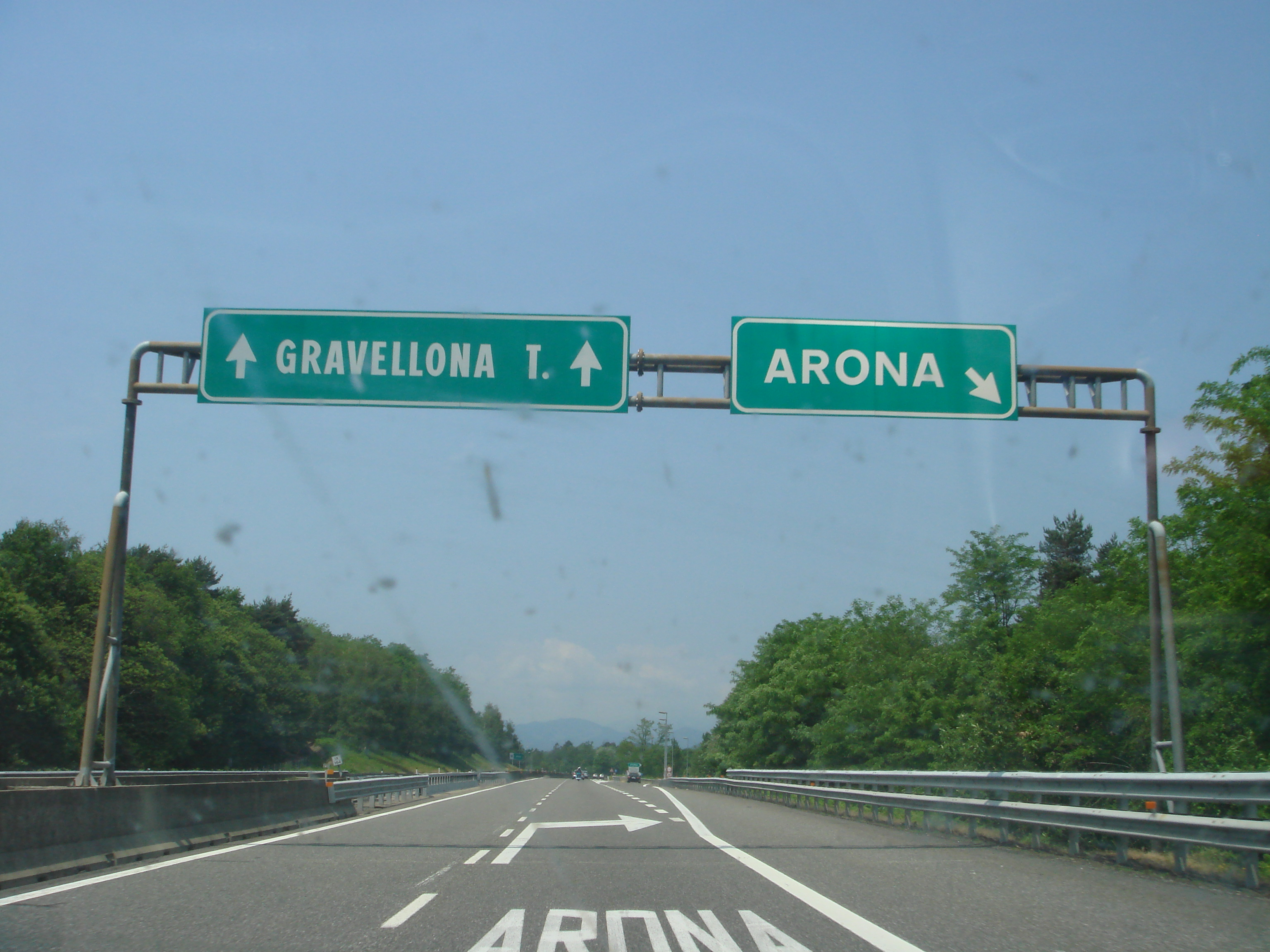
Autostrada A26 near Arona

The province is crossed by the following motorways (in Italian, autostrade):

- Autostrada A4: Turin-Trieste
- Autostrada A26: Genoa-Gravellona Toce

=== Railway lines ===
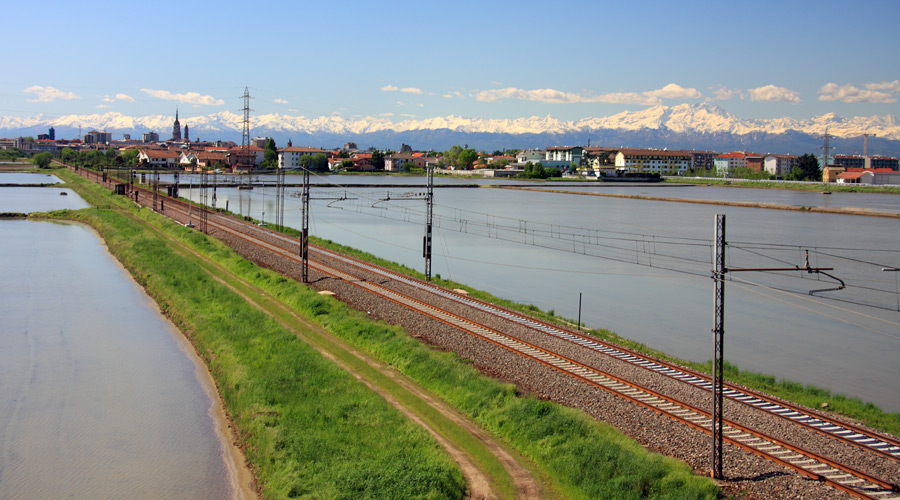
Turin–Milan railway near Novara

- Turin–Milan railway
- Domodossola–Milan railway
- Saronno–Novara railway
- Biella–Novara railway
- Alessandria–Novara–Arona railway
- Luino–Oleggio railway
- Novara–Varallo railway
