= Oleggio Castello =

- Comune
- Comune di Oleggio Castello
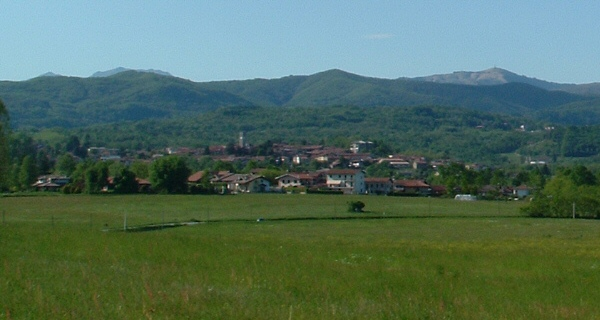
- View of Oleggio Castello

- Coat of arms

- Location within Italy Location within Piedmont
- Coordinates: 45°44′N 8°31′E
- Country: Italy
- Region: Piedmont
- Province: Novara (NO)
- Frazioni: Campora, Ceserio, La Valle

Government
  - Mayor: Marco Cairo

Area
  - Total: 5.8 km^{2} (2.2 sq mi)
- Elevation: 293 m (961 ft)

Population (21 March 2009)
  - Total: 1,968
  - Density: 340/km^{2} (880/sq mi)
- Demonym(s): Oleggesi, Oleggiaschi
- Time zone: UTC+1 (CET)
  - Summer (DST): UTC+2 (CEST)
- Postal code: 28040
- Dialing code: 0322
- Website: Official website

Oleggio Castello is a comune (municipality) in the Province of Novara in the Italian region of Piedmont, located about 100 kilometres (62 mi) northeast of Turin and about 35 kilometres (22 mi) north of Novara.
