= Biandrate =

- Comune
- Comune di Biandrate
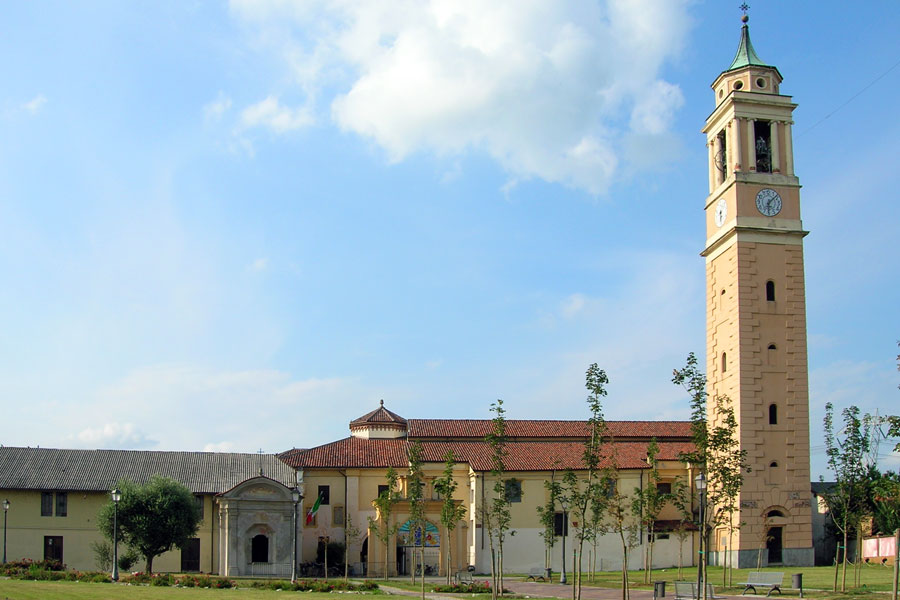
- Parish church in Biandrate

- Coat of arms

- Location within Italy Location within Piedmont
- Coordinates: 45°27′N 8°28′E
- Country: Italy
- Region: Piedmont
- Province: Novara (NO)

Government
  - Mayor: Luciano Pigat

Area
  - Total: 12.7 km^{2} (4.9 sq mi)
- Elevation: 160 m (520 ft)

Population (31 December 2010)
  - Total: 1,190
  - Density: 93.7/km^{2} (243/sq mi)
- Time zone: UTC+1 (CET)
  - Summer (DST): UTC+2 (CEST)
- Postal code: 28061
- Dialing code: 0321
- Patron saint: St. Serenus of Marseille
- Website: Official website

Biandrate (Piedmontese: Biandrà, Lombard: Biandraa) is a comune (municipality) in the Province of Novara in the Italian region Piedmont, located about 70 kilometres (43 miles) northeast of Turin and about 12 km (7 mi) west of Novara.

== History ==
Archaeological findings have proved that the area of Biandrate was already settled in Roman times, although no consensus exists about the existence of a Roman municipium here. After the fall of the Western Roman Empire, Biandrate regained importance only from the 10th century, when its counts held large territories in the area. In 1025, Count Vibertus, after expanding the family's lands around Vercelli and Val d'Ossola, obtained the title of Ivrea; such possessions were confirmed to his successor Guido II by Emperor Conrad II. His successor Alberto I took part in the First Crusade. In his age, Biandrate is mentioned as a free commune.

His successor Guido Guidone was named by Emperor Frederick Barbarossa as imperial commander of the area and of the Bishopric of Novara. He fought against Pavia but, after Barbarossa' defeat at the battle of Legnano, he was attacked by the Lombard League and Biandrate was destroyed. In 1232, the town was again razed to the ground by the counts of Novara. Later it was held by different families: (Visconti, Facino Cane, Sforza) after which it became part of the Duchy of Savoy.
