= Casaleggio Novara =

- Comune
- Comune di Casaleggio Novara
- The ruined church of S. Antonio, Casaleggio Novara

- Location within Italy Location within Piedmont
- Coordinates: 45°29′N 8°30′E
- Country: Italy
- Region: Piedmont
- Province: Novara (NO)

Government
  - Mayor: Valter Brustia

Area
  - Total: 10.5 km^{2} (4.1 sq mi)
- Elevation: 168 m (551 ft)

Population (Dec. 2004)
  - Total: 869
  - Density: 82.8/km^{2} (214/sq mi)
- Demonym: Casaleggesi
- Time zone: UTC+1 (CET)
  - Summer (DST): UTC+2 (CEST)
- Postal code: 28060
- Dialing code: 0321
- Website: Official website

Casaleggio Novara is a comune (municipality) in the province of Novara in the Italian region Piedmont, located about 80 kilometres (50 mi) northeast of Turin and about 10 kilometres (6 mi) northwest of Novara.
