= Uva Rara =

Variety of grape

Uva Rara is a red Italian wine grape variety that is grown in the Piedmont and Lombardy wine regions of northern Italy. The grape is a permitted blending variety along with Nebbiolo in the Denominazione di Origine Controllata e Garantita (DOCG) wines of Ghemme. In the Denominazione di Origine Controllata (DOC) wine region of Oltrepò Pavese the grape is often blended with Barbera and Croatina. While Uva Rara's name means "rare grape" in Italian, the variety is actually widely planted with 608 hectares (1,502 acres) of the vine recorded in Italy in 2000.

== History and relationship to other grapes ==
Uva Rara is widely planted in all the provinces of Piedmont.

Uva Rara has a long history of being grown in the Piedmont and Lombardy region, particularly in the provinces of Alessandria, Asti, Biella, Novara, Torino, Vercelli and Pavia. Here the grape has been historically used as a blending grape, with Nebbiolo in Piedmont and with Barbera and Croatina in Lombardy.

Uva Rara is often confused with the Gattinara and Oltrepò Pavese grape Vespolina that is also known as Uva Rara, which means "rare grape" in Italian. Around the communes of Novara, Pavia and Vercelli, Uva Rara is known as Bonarda which has led it to be confused with many of the other grape varieties known as Bonarda, particularly Bonarda Piemontese. However, despite the similarities of synonyms and use in many of the same wines, there is no known relationship between Uva Rara and these other grape varieties.

== Viticulture ==
Uva Rara is a mid to late-ripening grape variety. Among the viticultural hazards that the vine is most susceptible to includes the fungal infection of powdery mildew and millerandage which can lead to the malformation of grape berries if the weather is unfavourable during flowering.

== Wine regions ==
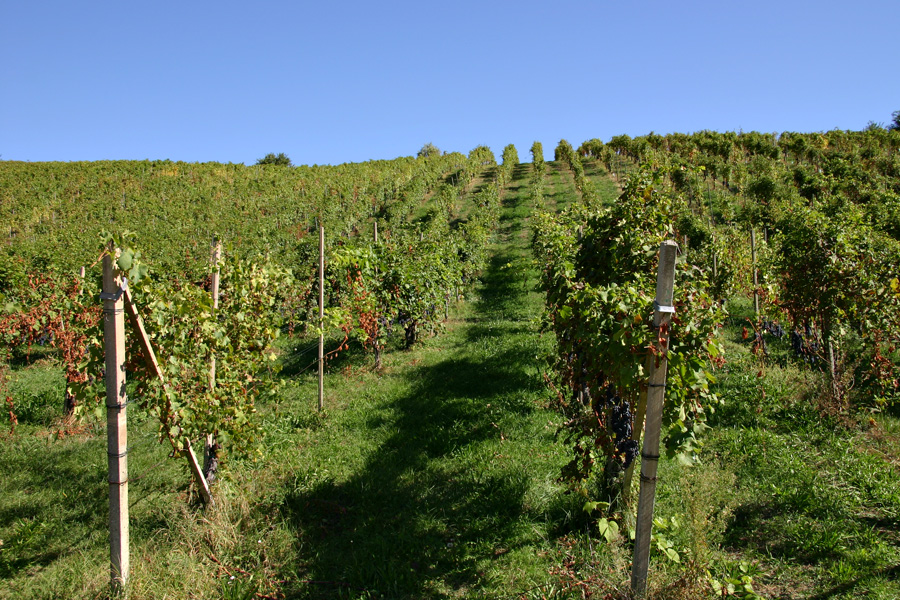
Vineyard in the Colline Novaresi DOC where Uva Rara can be used in the DOC red blend with Nebbiolo and Vespolina or made as a varietal.

In 2000, there were 608 hectares (1,502 acres) of Uva Rara planted throughout Italy with the vast majority in the Piedmont and Lombardy regions. Here the grape is a permitted blending variety in several DOCs and can be made as a varietal in the Colline Novaresi DOC. In the Oltrepò Pavese and San Colombano al Lambro DOC, Uva Rara is usually blended with Croatina and Barbera while in the Boca, Fara, Coste della Sesia DOC and Sizzano DOCs, it plays a secondary role to Nebbiolo. It is also permitted in the DOCG wine of Ghemme where it plays a similar role in softening the Nebbiolo-based wines of the region.

== Styles ==
While Uva Rara is primarily a blending grape, adding softness and fruit to the wines, it can also be made into a varietal. According to Master of Wine Jancis Robinson, varietal styles of Uva Rara tend to be soft, medium bodied with a very perfumed bouquet but the potential to have a bitter finish.

== Synonyms ==
Over the years Uva Rara has been known under a variety of synonyms including: Balsamea, Balsamina, Balsamina nera, Bonarda, Bonarda di Cavaglia, Bonarda di Gattinara, Bonarda Novarese, Foglia Lucente, Martellana, Oriana, Orianella, Oriola, Raione, Rairon, Raplum, Raplun and Rara.
