= Brugnola =

Variety of grape

Brugnola is a red Italian wine grape variety that is grown in the Lombardy wine region of Valtellina. While historically, Brugnola was thought to be a local synonym for Emilia-Romagna wine grape Fortana, DNA analysis has shown that the two grapes are distinct variety and that, instead, Brugnola shares a close genetic relationship with the Piedmont wine grape Nebbiolo.

Today, Brugnola is a permitted grape variety in the Denominazione di Origine Controllata e Garantita (DOCG) of Valtellina Superiore, the grape is historically present throughout the provincial territory cultivated with vines, but more closely traced back to the Inferno sub-zone in historical documents.

== History ==
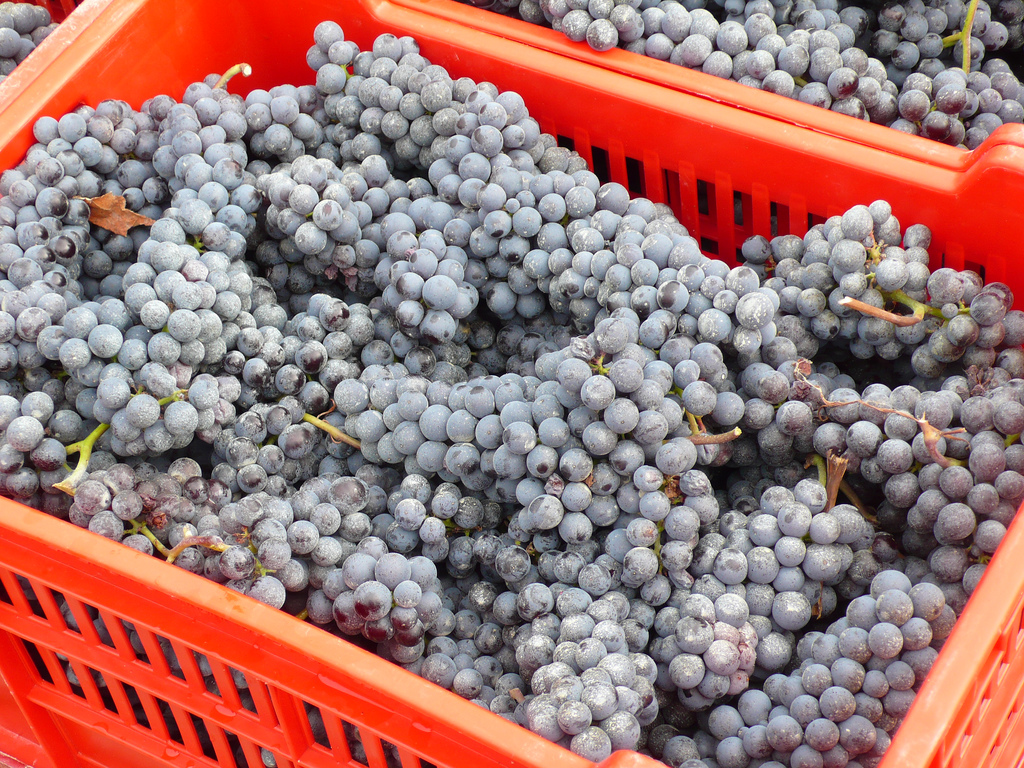
In the early 21st century, DNA analysis revealed that Brugnola has a close parent-offspring relationship with the Piemontese wine grape Nebbiolo (pictured).

Brugnola was long thought to be a local synonym used in the Valtellina region for the red Emilia-Romagna grape, Fortana. Even as recently as the 2000 census, plantings of Brugnola in Lombardy were officially counted as part of Fortana's 1,109 hectares (2,740 acres) planted throughout Italy. In the early 21st century, DNA analysis revealed that Brugnola and Fortana were distinct varieties but that Brugnola shared a close parent-offspring relationship with the Piemontese wine grape Nebbiolo, known locally as Chiavennasca.

=== Relationship to other grapes ===
Through its parent-offspring relationship with Nebbiolo, Brugnola is a half-sibling of several Piemontese wine grape varieties including: Bubbierasco, Vespolina, Freisa, Nebbiolo rosé, Negretta, Neretto di Bairo and Rossola nera.

== Viticulture ==
In Lombardy, Brugnola is noted for producing reliable yields and its strong resistance to the viticultural hazards of downy mildew and botrytis bunch rot. However, the vine is very prone to damage caused by the onset of powdery mildew late in the growing season.

== Wine regions ==
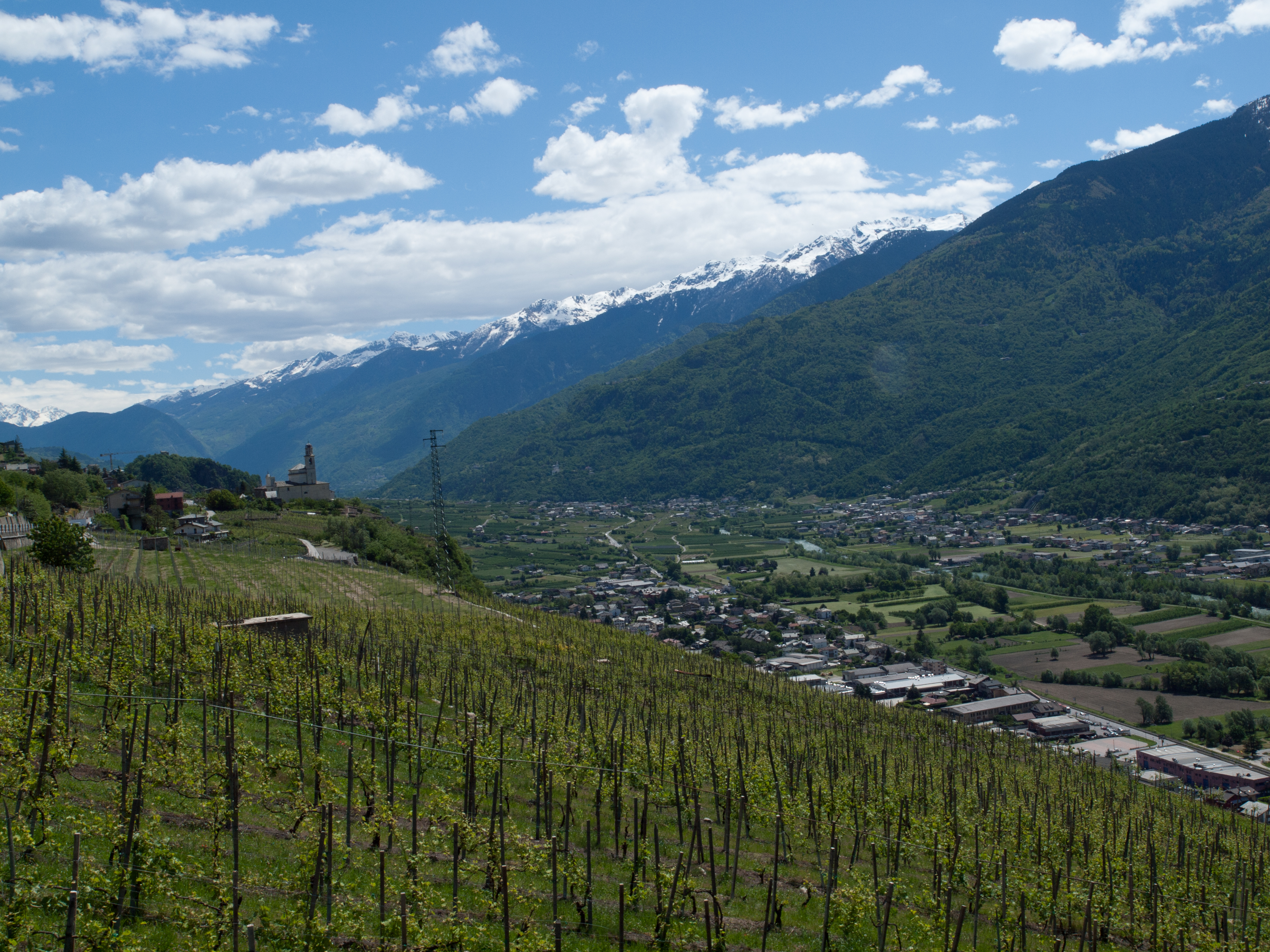
Historically, plantings of Brugnola in the Valtellina region (pictured) were officially counted as being Fortana vines.

While Brugnola was still officially considered only a synonym of Fortana in the 2000 Italian census, nearly all of the plantings of Brugnola in the Valtellina region are believed to be actual Brugnola plantings. The grape is a permitted blending variety in several of the red wines of Valtellina, most notably the DOCG wines of Valtellina Superiore-Grumello. Here is it blended with both Nebbiolo (Chiavennasca) as well as Rossola nera.
