= Bonarda =

Bonarda may refer to one of several grape varieties:

- Douce noir, known as Bonarda in Argentina and Charbono in California
- Bonarda Piemontese, grown in Piedmont, around Turin
- Croatina or Bonarda dell'Oltrepò Pavese, grown in Lombardy, around Pavia
- Uva Rara or Bonarda Novarese, in Novara and Vercelli.
