= Rossola =

Rossola is an alternative name for several wine grape varieties including:

- Rossola nera
- Rossignola
- Roter Veltliner
- Trebbiano
