= Freisa =

Variety of grape

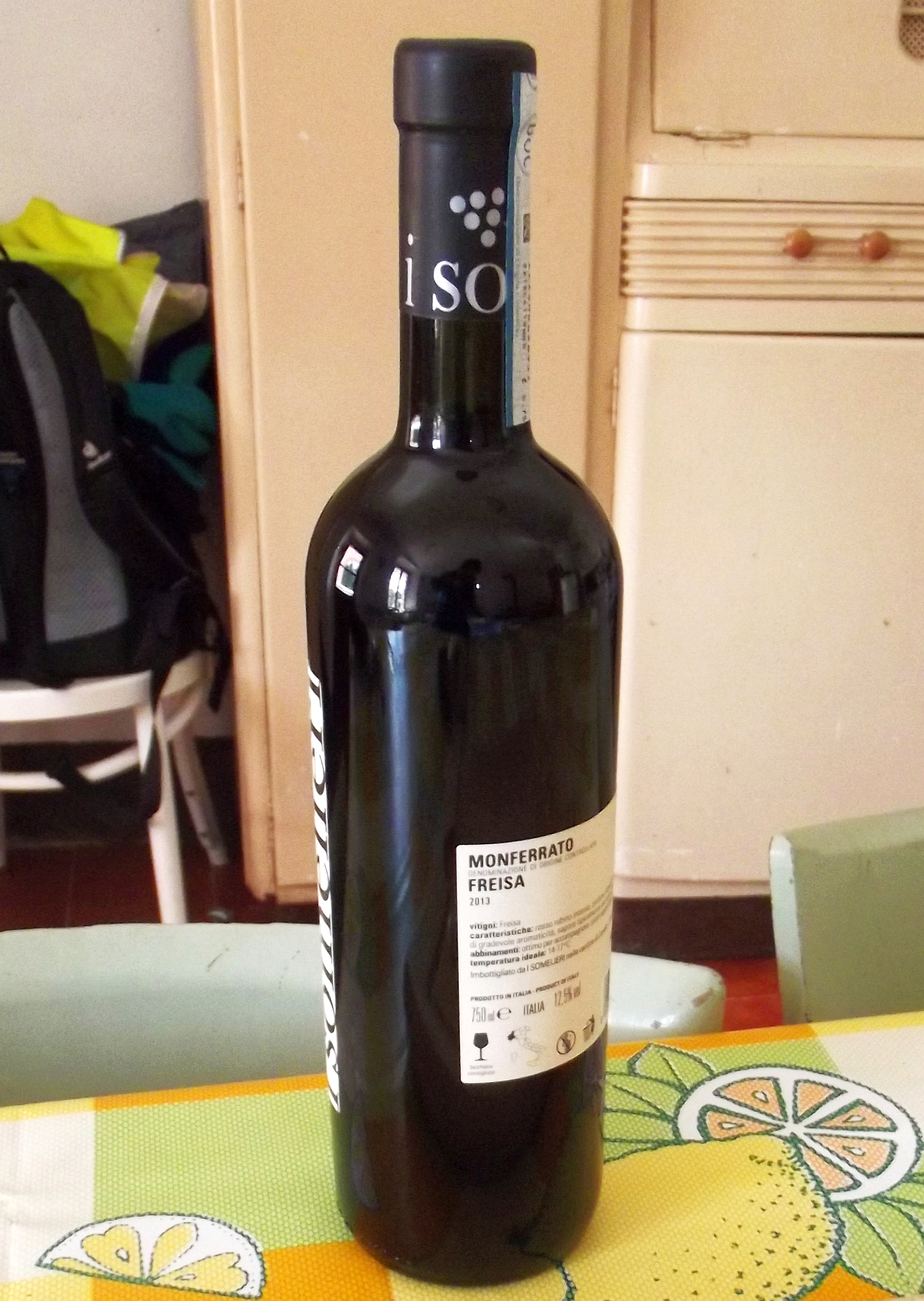
Monferrato Freisa DOC 2013

Freisa is a red Italian wine grape variety grown in the Piedmont region of north-west Italy, primarily in Monferrato and in the Langhe, but also further north in the provinces of Turin and Biella. Freisa is a vigorous and productive vine whose round, blue-black grapes are harvested in early October. The three-lobed leaves are relatively small and the bunches are elongated in form. By the 1880s it had become one of the major Piedmontese grapes, and in that period its cultivation was stimulated by the vine's resistance to the downy mildew caused by the Plasmopara viticola fungus. Wines made from the Freisa grape are red and usually somewhat sweet and lightly sparkling, or foaming. Still and fully sparkling versions are also produced, however, as are dry and more decidedly sweet styles. In the Canavese there is also a rosé which can be made primarily from Freisa according to Denominazione di origine controllata (DOC) regulations.

== History ==
Plantings of Freisa in the Piedmont region date back to at least the 18th century and ampelographers believe that the grape likely originated there in the hills between Asti and Turin. Recent DNA profiling by the University of California, Davis revealed that Freisa has a parent-offspring relationship with Nebbiolo. There are two major clonal varieties of Freisa-a small-berried clone known as Freisa Piccolo which is more widely planted and a larger berry Freisa Grossa or Freisa di Nizza that tends to be planted on flatter, fertile terrain and produced less distinguished wine. Freisa di Chieri is potentially its own sub-variety of Freisa Piccolo grown in the Chieri region and distinguished by its own DOC. It creates a very perfumed, deep coloured and tannic wine.

=== Relationship to other grapes ===
Through its parent-offspring relationship with Nebbiolo, Freisa is a half-sibling of several Piemontese wine grape varieties including: Vespolina, Brugnola, Bubbierasco, Nebbiolo rosé, Negretta, Neretto di Bairo and Rossola nera.

== Viticulture ==
Freisa is a vigorous and productive vine whose round, blue-black grapes are harvested in early October. The three-lobed leaves are relatively small and the bunches are elongated in form. The vine is highly resistant to peronospora but has some susceptibility to oidium. It grows best in well-exposed, sunny sites on hillsides.

== Wines ==
Similar to Nebbiolo, Freisa produces wines with considerable tannins and acidity. While it can be used in blends, it is most often encountered as a varietal. Traditionally Freisa was produced as a slightly sparkling wine with some noticeable sweetness. To balance the bitterness from the grape and ageing on its lees, the wines would be made with a small amount of residual sugar and allowed to go through a secondary fermentation to create a limited amount of frothiness. This bitter/sweet dynamic has brought Freisa its share of fans and critics with wine experts such Hugh Johnson describing the wine as being "immensely appetizing" to Robert M. Parker, Jr. describing Freisa as producing "totally repugnant wines".

Modern winemaking technology has introduced techniques to minimize some of the bitter tannins and ferment the wine fully dry. These include temperature control fermentation vessels and ageing in oak barrels. Like Nebbiolo, Freisa produces a relatively light-coloured wine but with more distinctive purple hues. The wines are often characterized with strawberry, raspberry and violet aromas.

=== Freisa Nebbiolata ===
Freisa Nebbiolata is a specialty wine of the Piedmont region made in a ripasso style. In this style, the Fresia must is fermented with leftover Nebbiolo skins from the production of Barolo. This creates a highly tannic wine with the potential for complex flavours.

== Wine regions ==
Freisa is seen rarely outside of its Piedmont homeland, though there are a few hundred acres of the vine planted in Argentina carried over to South America by Italian immigrants. Even within Piedmont, its acreage is declining. It is most commonly found in the Asti, Langhe, Monferrato and Pinerolese regions.

=== List of DOC wines employing the Freisa grape ===
100% Freisa:

- in the province of Asti
  - Freisa d'Asti
  - Freisa d'Asti superiore
- in the province of Cuneo
  - Langhe Freisa
  - Langhe Freisa Vigna
- in the province of Turin
  - Freisa di Chieri amabile
  - Freisa di Chieri frizzante
  - Freisa di Chieri secco
  - Freisa di Chieri spumante
  - Freisa di Chieri superiore

85%–100% Freisa:

- In the provinces of Asti and Alessandria
  - Monferrato Freisa
  - Monferrato Freisa novello
  - Monferrato rosso
- In the provinces of Cuneo and Turin
  - Pineronese Freisa

Wines which may be made primarily from Freisa (at least 60%), or from which it may be absent:

- In the provinces of Biella and Turin
  - Canavese rosato
  - Canavese rosso

Other wines which may include smaller percentages of Freisa:

- In the province of Asti
  - Albugnano rosato (0%–15% Freisa)
  - Albugnano rosso (0%–15% Freisa)
  - Albugnano superiore (0%–15% Freisa)
  - Malvasia di Castelnuovo Don Bosco, in still and spumante versions (0%–15% Freisa)
  - Grignolino d'Asti (0%–10% Freisa)
- In the province of Alessandria
  - Grignolino del Monferrato Casalese (0%–10% Freisa)

== Synonyms ==
Synonyms for Freisa include Monferrina, Monfreisa, Fessietta, Freisa di Chieri, Fresa, and Spannina.
