= Rossolino nero =

Variety of grape

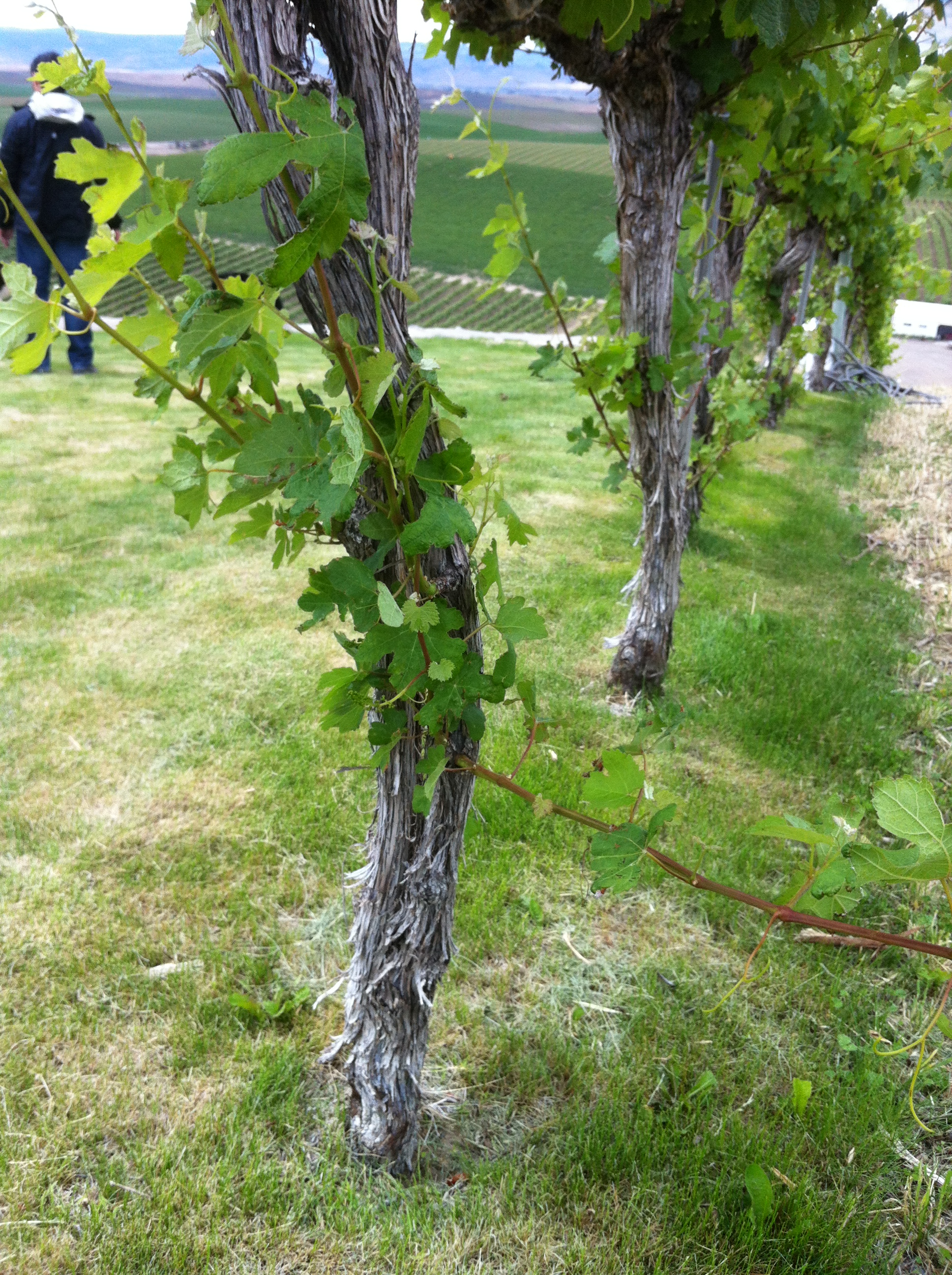
The Rossolino nero vine can be very vigorous with excessive foliage and suckers (basal shoots) growing from the trunk that will detract from the vine resources that go into ripening the grape clusters.

Rossolino nero is a red Italian wine grape variety that is grown in the Valtellina region of Lombardy in northern Italy. The grape was once thought to be a clone of Rossola nera but DNA profiling in the late 20th and early 21st century has shown that the two grapes are distinct varieties but are likely related. Around the village of Teglio, a pink-skinned color mutation of Rossolino nero exist that is known as Rossolino Rosa.

== Viticulture ==
Rossolino nero is a mid-ripening vine that can be very vigorous and prone to produce excessive amounts of foliage and suckers if not kept in check with vine training and leaf pulling. While the grapevine has good resistance to downy mildew, it is very susceptible to the viticultural hazards of botrytis bunch rot and powdery mildew.

== Relationship to other grapes ==
For many years Rossolino nero was thought to be a clone of Rossola nera, a red grape permitted to be blended with Nebbiolo in the Denominazione di origine controllata (DOC) of Valtellina. Even though DNA analysis has now shown that the two grapes are distinct, the varieties are often found intermixed in field blends and in official Italian grape census, plantings of two are often combined the total calculations. Further DNA profiling has suggested that Rossolino nero and Rossola nera are closely related as parent-offspring with Rossola nera most likely being the parent variety and Rossolino nero the offspring.

Around the village of Teglio in the province of Sondrio near the Swiss border, a pink-berried color mutation of Rossolino nero has been found that is known as Rossolino rosa.
