= Balsamina =

Balsamina is an alternative name for several wine grape varieties including:

- Marzemino
- Syrah
- Uva Rara
