= Ghemme DOCG =

Geographically protected Italian wine

Coordinates: 45°36′N 8°25′E

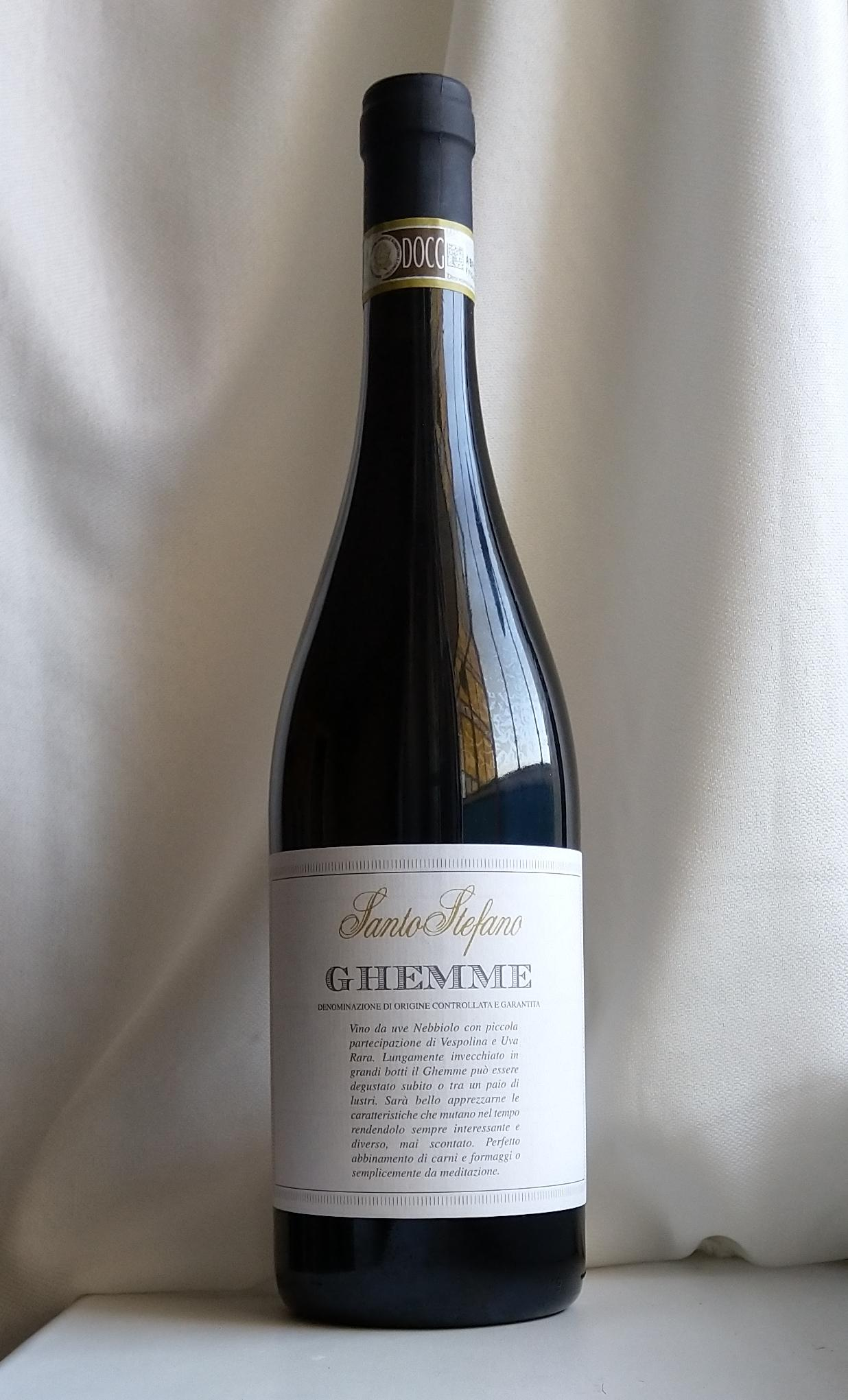
Bottle of Ghemme

Ghemme is a red Italian wine with Denominazione di Origine Controllata e Garantita status produced in the Colli Novaresi viticultural area in the hills of the Province of Novara in Piedmont. It was awarded DOC status in 1969 and received its DOCG classification in 1997.

The wine is made primarily from the Nebbiolo grape varietal (known locally as Spanna) and like Gattinara, it may be blended with Uva Rara (known locally as Bonarda di Gattinara) and Vespolina.

A minimum of 3 years total ageing is required, including a minimum of 20 months in wood and 9 months in a bottle from November 1 of the harvest year. Riserva is a minimum of 4 years of total ageing, including a minimum of 25 months in wood and 9 months in a bottle from November 1 of the harvest year.
