= Bubbierasco =

Variety of grape

Bubbierasco is a red Italian wine grape variety that is grown in the province of Cuneo in the Piedmont wine region of northwest Italy. The grape is a natural crossing of the Nebbiolo grape, famous for the red wines of Barolo and Barbaresco, and Bianchetta di Saluzzo, a white grape variety that has been historically grown around the town of Saluzzo.

== History and relationship to other grapes ==
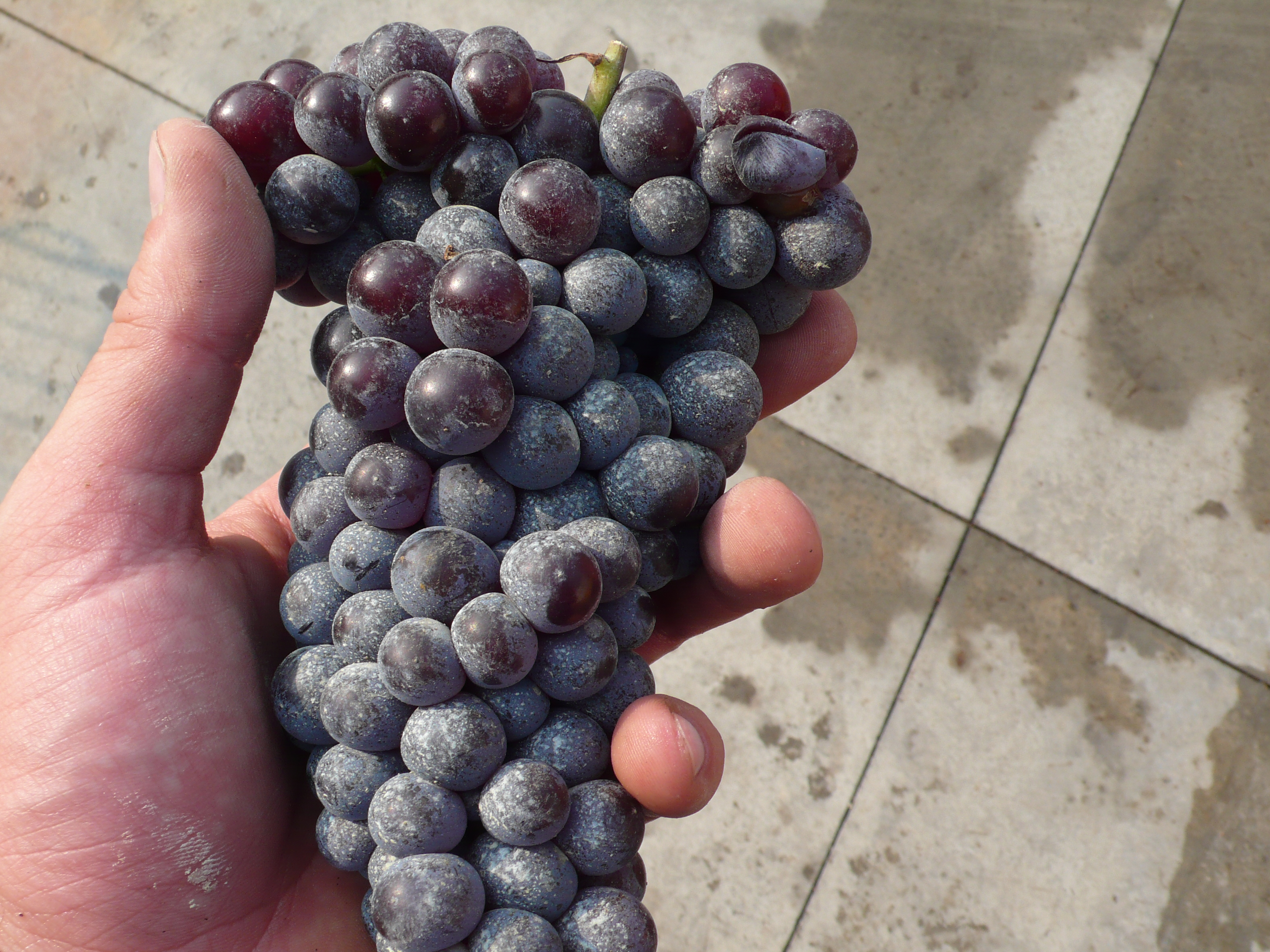
Nebbiolo, one of the parent varieties of Bubbierasco.

Ampelographers believe that Bubbierasco likely originated around the town of Saluzzo, in the Cuneo province, where its two parent varieties, Bianchetta di Saluzzo and Nebbiolo, have both been grown. In the early 21st century, DNA analysis showed that Bubbierasco was likely a natural crossing of the white Bianchetta and red Nebbiolo varieties.

Through its parent-offspring relationship with Nebbiolo, Bubbierasco is a half-sibling of several Piemontese wine grape varieties including: Vespolina, Brugnola, Freisa, Nebbiolo rosé, Negretta, Neretto di Bairo and Rossola nera.

== Wine regions ==
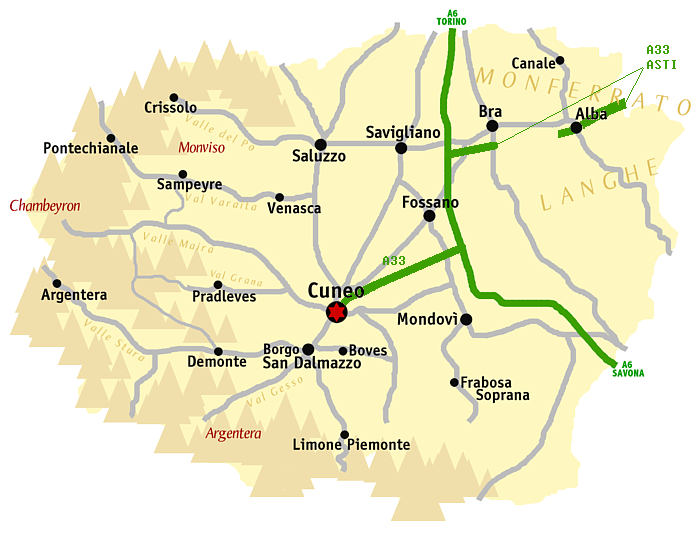
The province of Cuneo where Bubbierasco is cultivated.

Today Bubbierasco is almost exclusively cultivated in the province of Cuneo in Piedmont with most plantings found in the Val Bronda region near Saluzzo.

== Synonyms ==
Currently, the Vitis International Variety Catalogue (VIVC) recognizes no official synonyms for Bubbierasco.
