= Ghemme =

- Comune
- Comune di Ghemme
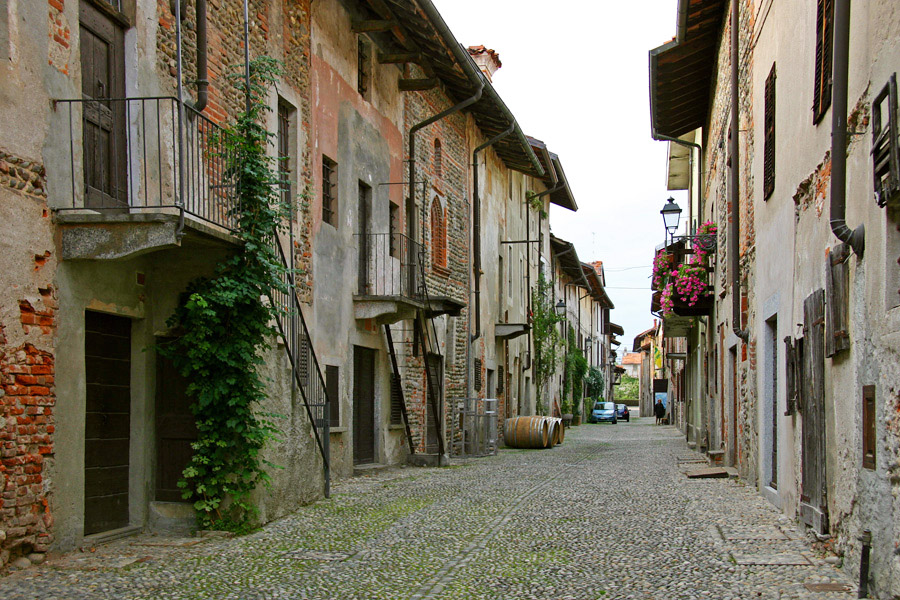
- View of Ghemme

- Coat of arms

- Location within Italy Location within Piedmont
- Coordinates: 45°36′N 8°25′E
- Country: Italy
- Region: Piedmont
- Province: Novara (NO)
- Frazioni: Strona

Government
  - Mayor: Davide Temporelli

Area
  - Total: 20.57 km^{2} (7.94 sq mi)
- Elevation: 241 m (791 ft)

Population (2007)
  - Total: 3,668
  - Density: 178.3/km^{2} (461.8/sq mi)
- Demonym: Ghemmesi
- Time zone: UTC+1 (CET)
  - Summer (DST): UTC+2 (CEST)
- Postal code: 28074
- Dialing code: 0163
- Patron saint: Blessed Panacea
- Saint day: First Friday of May
- Website: Official website

Ghemme is a comune (municipality) in the Province of Novara in the Italian region Piedmont, located on the river Sesia about 80 kilometres (50 mi) northeast of Turin and about 25 kilometres (16 mi) northwest of Novara.

It is the birthplace of architect Alessandro Antonelli and the town of origin of Blessed Panacea De' Muzzi. The main attraction is the castle (Castello-ricetto), built in the 11th to 15th centuries.

Ghemme is notable for its red wine, producing Ghemme DOCG from Nebbiolo grapes.

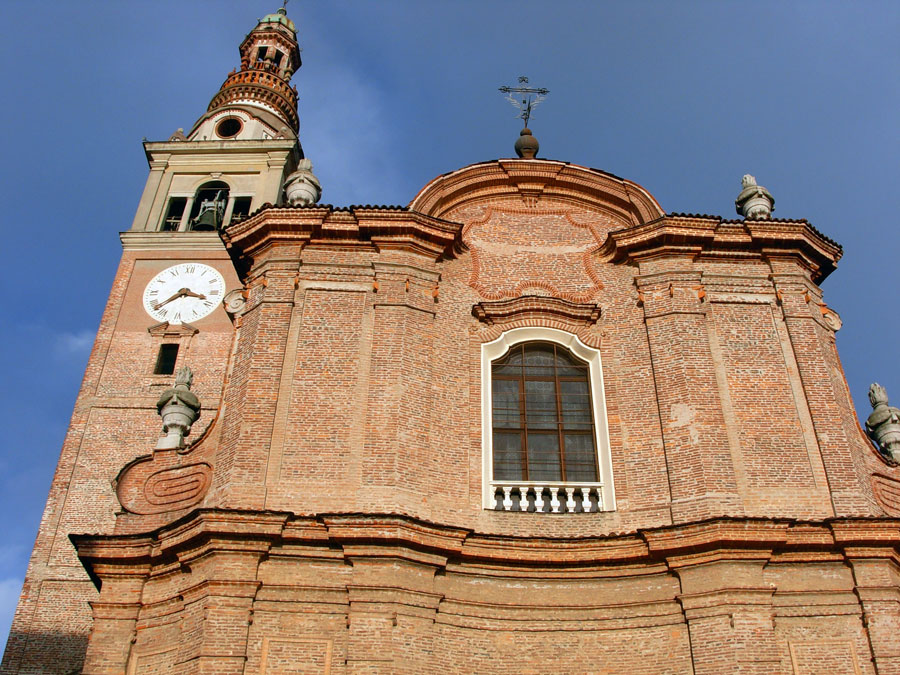
Facade of the parish church
