= Rossola nera =

Variety of grape

Rossola nera is a red Italian wine grape variety that has been growing in the Valtellina region of Lombardy since at least the 17th century. In 2004 DNA profiling determined that the grape has a parent-offspring relationship with the Piedmont wine grape Nebbiolo though which variety is the parent and which is the offspring is not yet clear. However, most ampelographers believe that Nebbiolo is likely the parent variety since written records in Piedmont have noted Nebbiolo being grown since at least the 13th century.

== History and relationship to other grapes ==
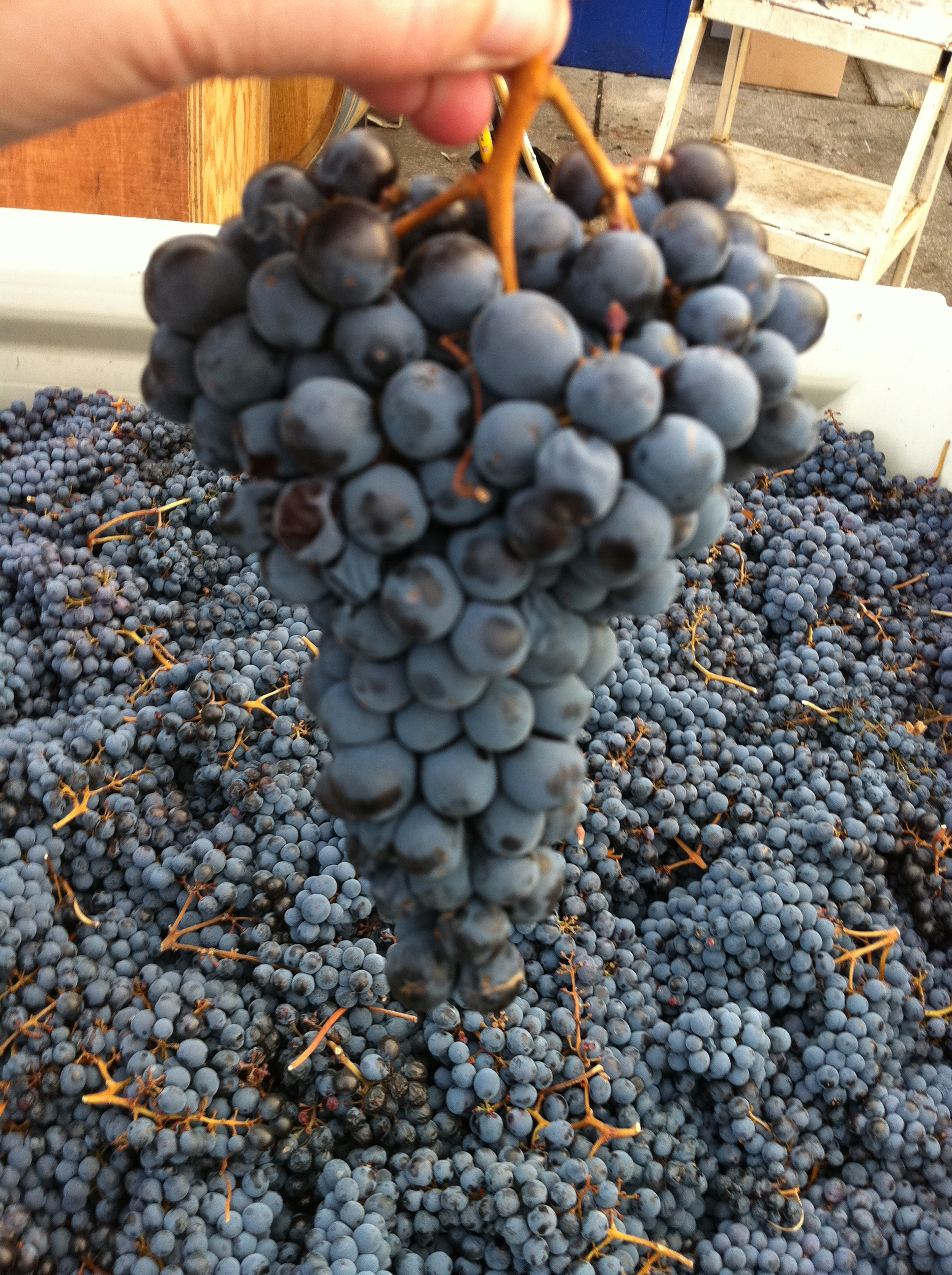
Nebbiolo, one of the parent varieties of Rossola nera.

An early 17th century Latin text list Rossola nera, under the synonym Rossoladure, as one of the grape varieties growing in Valtellina. The grape's name Rossola derives from the Italian word rosso and refers to the reddish-pink color that the grape berries become after veraison. Several grape varieties have rosso in their primary names or synonyms and over the years Rossola nera has been confused for Rossara Trentina, Rossignola and Rossolino nero. In 2001, DNA analysis would show that Rossola nera was a likely parent variety for Rossolino nero.

In 2004, DNA evidence suggested that Rossola nera and Nebbiolo, the grape behind the notable Italian wines Barolo and Barbaresco, have a parent-offspring relationship. With Nebbiolo's long recorded history of being cultivated in the Piedmont region since at least the 12th century, wine historians and ampelographers largely believe that Rossola nera is likely the offspring in that relationship.

Through its parent-offspring relationship with Nebbiolo, Rossola nera is a half-sibling of several Piemontese wine grape varieties including: Vespolina, Brugnola, Bubbierasco, Nebbiolo rosé, Negretta, Neretto di Bairo and Freisa.

Despite this new evidence of Rossola nera's likely heritage, there is still some confusion about the grape's relationship with similarly named vines grown elsewhere. This includes the dark-berried color mutation of Trebbiano (Rossola bianca) that is grown in northern Italy as well as the Rossolo vine from the Trentino-Alto Adige/Südtirol wine region that is often blended with Schiava (Trollinger). Wine expert Oz Clarke notes that there is long standing questions as to whether the Rossola nera vines grown in Corsica are the same vines, or closely related, to the Lombardy Rossola nera.

== Viticulture ==
Rossola nera is a late-ripening grapevine that can be very vigorous and high yielding if not kept in check by winter pruning or green harvesting. While the vine has good resistance to spring time frost damage, it is susceptible to the viticultural hazards of botrytis bunch rot and powdery mildew.

== Wine regions ==
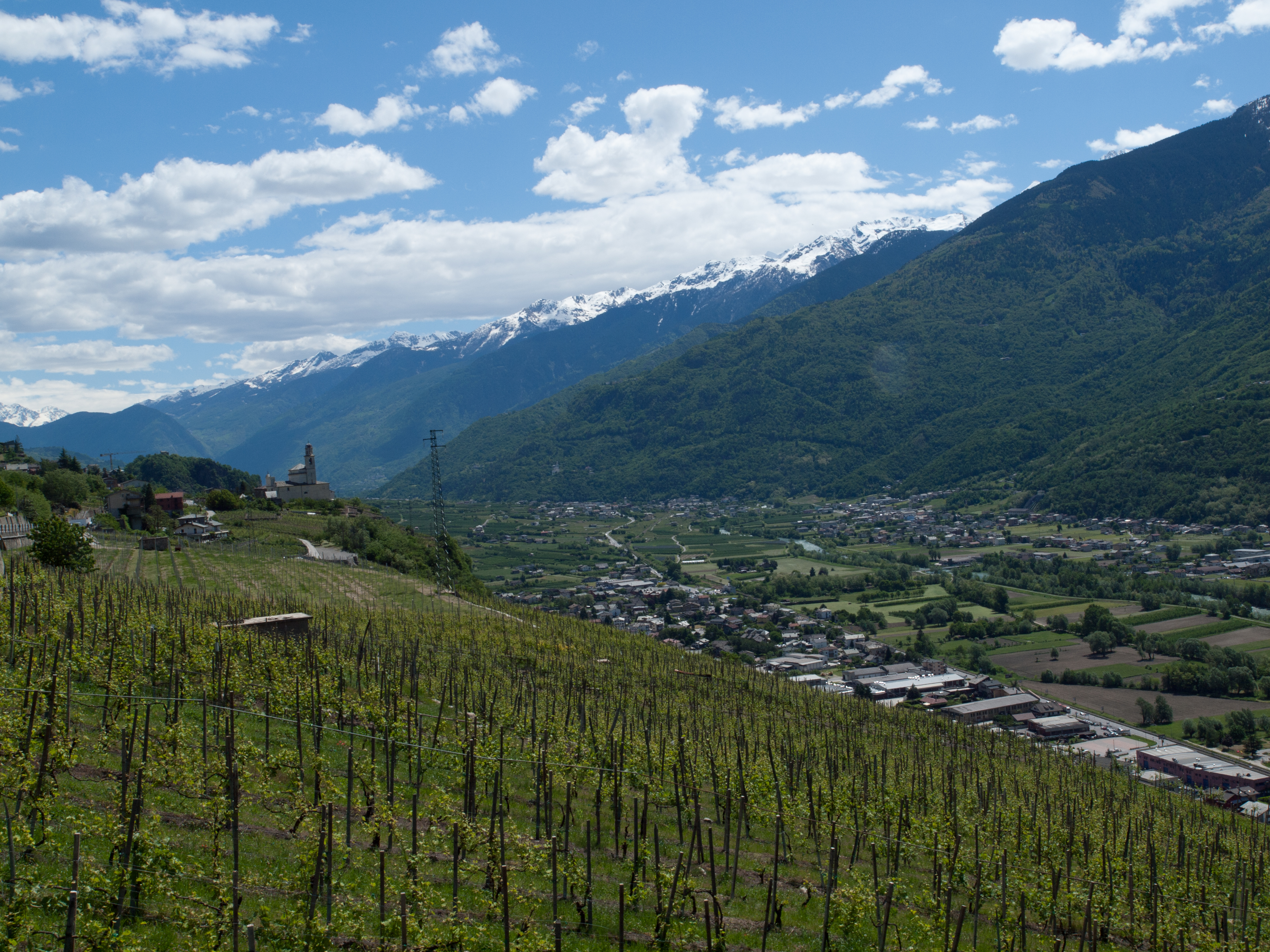
Most plantings of Rossola nera are found in the Valtellina region of Lombardy.

In 2000 there were 115 hectares (284 acres) of Rossola nera planted in Italy, the vast majority of it in the Valtellina region of Lombardy and extending all the way to the Swiss border. Here the grape is a minor blending component permitted to account for between 5-25% of the various Denominazione di origine controllata (DOC) red wines of Lombardy.

In the Valtellina DOC, up to 20% of Rossola nera can be blended into the Nebbiolo-based wine (known locally as Chiavennasca) provided the grapes are limited to a harvest yield of 12 tonnes/ha. The finished wine must be aged for at least 2 years prior to release (3 years if a Riserva bottling) with a minimum alcohol level of at least 11%. Rossola nera is similarly permitted in the Denominazione di Origine Controllata e Garantita (DOCG) wines of Valtellina Superiore but only up to 10% of the blend. Yields for the DOCG wines are further restricted to a maximum of 8 tonnes/ha. While the aging requirements are the same the minimum alcohol level for the DOCG wine is 12%.

== Styles ==
According to Master of Wine Jancis Robinson, Rossola nera is most often used as a blending grape (frequently with Nebbiolo) where it contributes acidity to the blend.

== Synonyms ==
Over the years Rossola nera has been known under a variety of synonyms including: Rossoladure, Rossera, Rossola and Rossolo. However, Vitis International Variety Catalogue (VIVC) managed by the Geilweilerhof Institute for Grape Breeding in Germany currently does not recognize any synonyms for the grape variety. The VIVC does list Rossola nera as a recognized synonym of Mourvèdre.
