= Groppello =

Variety of grape

- Grape (Vitis)
- Color of berry skin: Noir
- Species: Vitis vinifera
- Origin: Italy

Groppello is a red Italian wine grape variety planted primarily in the Lombardy region.
