= Gattinara DOCG =

Geographically protected Italian wine

Coordinates: 45.608°N 8.367°E

Gattinara is a red Italian wine with denominazione di origine controllata e garantita (DOCG) status produced from Nebbiolo grapes grown within the boundaries of the comune of Gattinara, which is located in the hills in the north of the province of Vercelli, northwest of Novara, in the Piedmont region. It was awarded DOC status in 1967 and received its DOCG classification in 1990.

== Wines ==
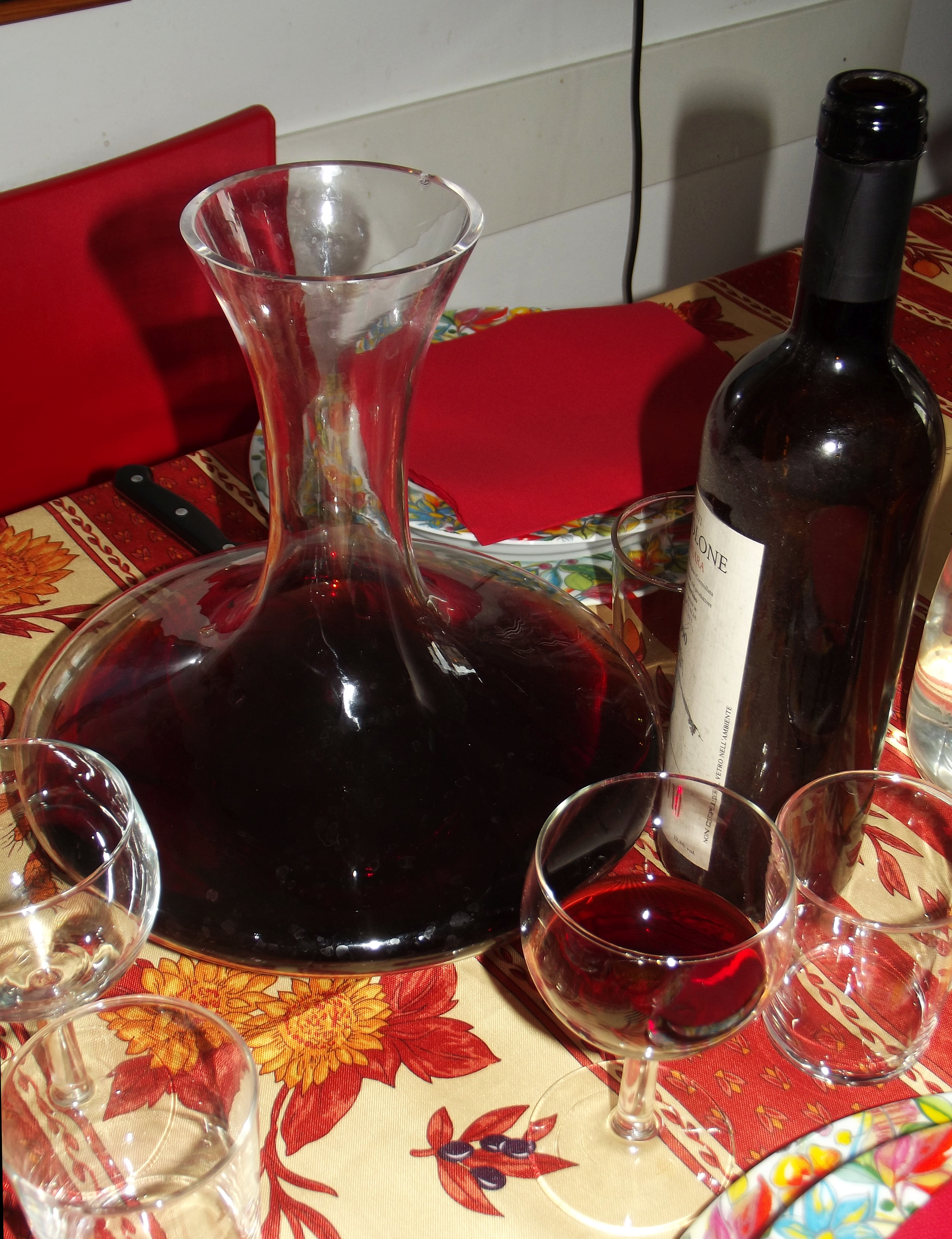
Gattinara 1990 in a decanter

The wine is made primarily from the Nebbiolo grape variety (known locally as Spanna) which must constitute a minimum of 90% of the wine and may be blended with up to 10% Bonarda di Gattinara and no more than 4% of Vespolina. The wine is aged in wooden barrels for two years or three years if it is a riserva, with an additional two years of ageing in the bottle. The Oxford Companion to Wine asserts that wine from Vercelli hills on the west bank of the Sesia River and Novara hills are capable of producing rivals to Barolo and Barbaresco, and has at times in Piedmontese history been more admired than Barolo for its longevity.
