= Fortana =

Variety of grape

Fortana (also known as Canina nera) is a red Italian wine grape variety grown primarily in the Emilia–Romagna region of northern Italy. A permitted grape variety in several Denominazione di origine controllatas (DOCs), mostly in Emilia, Fortana mostly contributes tartness and acidity in red blends.

== Relationship to other grapes ==
In the Valtellina region of Lombardy, Brugnola was long thought to be a local synonym for Fortana. Even as recently as the 2000 census, plantings of Brugnola in Lombardy were officially counted as part of Fortana's 1,109 hectares (2,740 acres) planted throughout Italy. However, in the early 21st century DNA analysis revealed that Brugnola and Fortana were actually distinct varieties.

== Synonyms ==
Synonyms describing Fortana and its wines include Albanella gentile, Brugnera, Brugnola, Brugnolera, Brungentile, Codigoro, Costa d'Oro, Dallora, Dallora nera, Dora, Forcella, Forcellina, Fortana nero, Fruttana, Fruttano, Prugnola, Prungentile, Uva Cornetta, Uva d'Aceto, Uva d'Oro, Uva d'Oro Sgaravella, Uva d'Oro Sgravella and Uva Francese nera.
