= Croatina =

Variety of grape

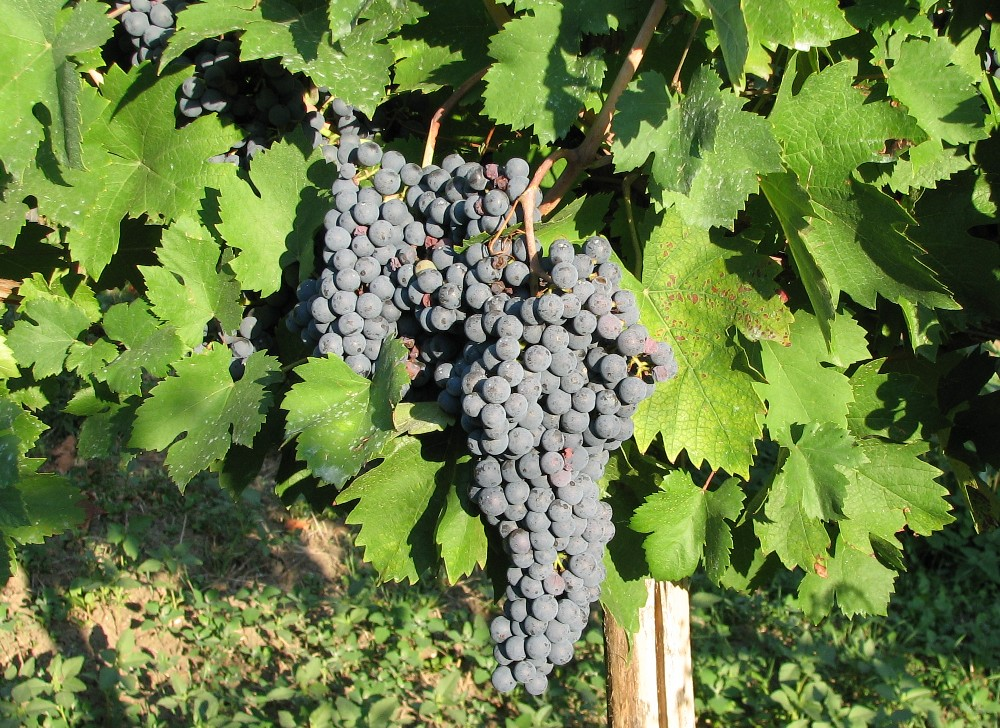
Croatina grapes

Croatina is a red Italian wine grape variety that is grown primarily in the Oltrepò Pavese region of Lombardy and in the Province of Piacenza within Emilia Romagna, but also in parts of Piedmont and the Veneto. In the Oltrepò Pavese, in the hills of Piacenza, in Cisterna d’Asti and San Damiano d’Asti (Province of Asti), and in Roero this variety is called ‘Bonarda’. It should not, however be confused with the Bonarda piemontese, which is an unrelated vine. In the Piedmont region, it is sometimes blended with Nebbiolo in wines of Novara and Vercelli Hills.

== Wines ==
Croatina has characteristics similar to the Dolcetto grape in that it tends to produce fruity, deeply colored wines that are mildly tannic and can benefit from bottle aging. Such is the case with the wine Oltrepò Pavese Bonarda DOC which contains from 85% to 100% Croatina (under its local name of ‘Bonarda’). However Croatina is often blended with Barbera, as in Gutturnio, a wine from Emilia-Romagna containing 30.0% – 45.0% Croatina. It may also be employed as a very minor part of a blend, as is the case with some examples of Amarone.

== Wine regions ==
The DOCs which allow the use of the Croatina grape are:

Emilia Romagna
Colli di Parma 25% – 40%
Colli di Scandiano e di Canossa 0% – 15%
Colli Piacentini (Gutturnio) 30% – 45%

Lombardy
Oltrepò Pavese 25% – 65%
Oltrepò Pavese Bonarda 85% – 100%
San Colombano al Lambro 30% – 45%

Piedmont
Colli Tortonesi varies but usually made as a single varietal wine, i.e., 100%
Bramaterra 20% – 30%
Cisterna d’Asti 80% – 100%
Colline Novaresi 0% – 30%
Colline Novaresi Croatina 85% – 100%
Coste della Sesia rosso at least 50% of one of the following: Nebbiolo, Bonarda piemontese, Vespolina, Croatina or Barbera
Coste della Sesia Croatina 85% – 100%

Veneto
Amarone 0% – 5%
