= Vespolina =

Variety of grape

- Grape (Vitis)
- Color of berry skin: Noir
- Species: Vitis vinifera
- Also called: See list of synonyms
- Origin: Italy
- VIVC number: 13018

Vespolina is a red Italian wine grape variety that is planted in Piedmont around Gattinara and Ghemme. Ampelographer believe that the grape is most likely indigenous to this area of Piedmont and recent DNA profiling identified a parent-offspring relationship with Nebbiolo. Outside Piedmont it is found in the Lombardy region of Oltrepò Pavese where the grape is known as Ughetta. In Gattinara, Vespolina is sometimes blended with Nebbiolo and Bonarda Piemontese. Unlike the white Italian grape Vespaiolo, the root of the name Vespolina does not have a direct connection with vespe or wasp. However the true origins of the name are still unclear.

== Relationship to other grapes ==
Through its parent-offspring relationship with Nebbiolo, Vespolina is a half-sibling of several Piemontese wine grape varieties including: Bubbierasco, Brugnola, Freisa, Nebbiolo rosé, Negretta, Neretto di Bairo and Rossola nera.

== Synonyms ==
The grape Vespolina is known under a variety of synonyms. These include Balsamina, Canneta, Croattina, Guzetta, Guzitta, Guzzetta, Inzaga, Inzagre, Massana, Nespolina, Nespolino, Novarina, Solenga, Ughetta, Ughetta di Caneto, Ughetta di Canetto, Ughetta di Canneto, Ughetta di Fassolo, Ughetta di Solenga, Uva Cinerina, Uva Rara, Uvetta, Uvetto, Vespolino, Visparola and Vispavola.
