= Nebbiolo =

Variety of Italian red wine grape

- Grape (Vitis)
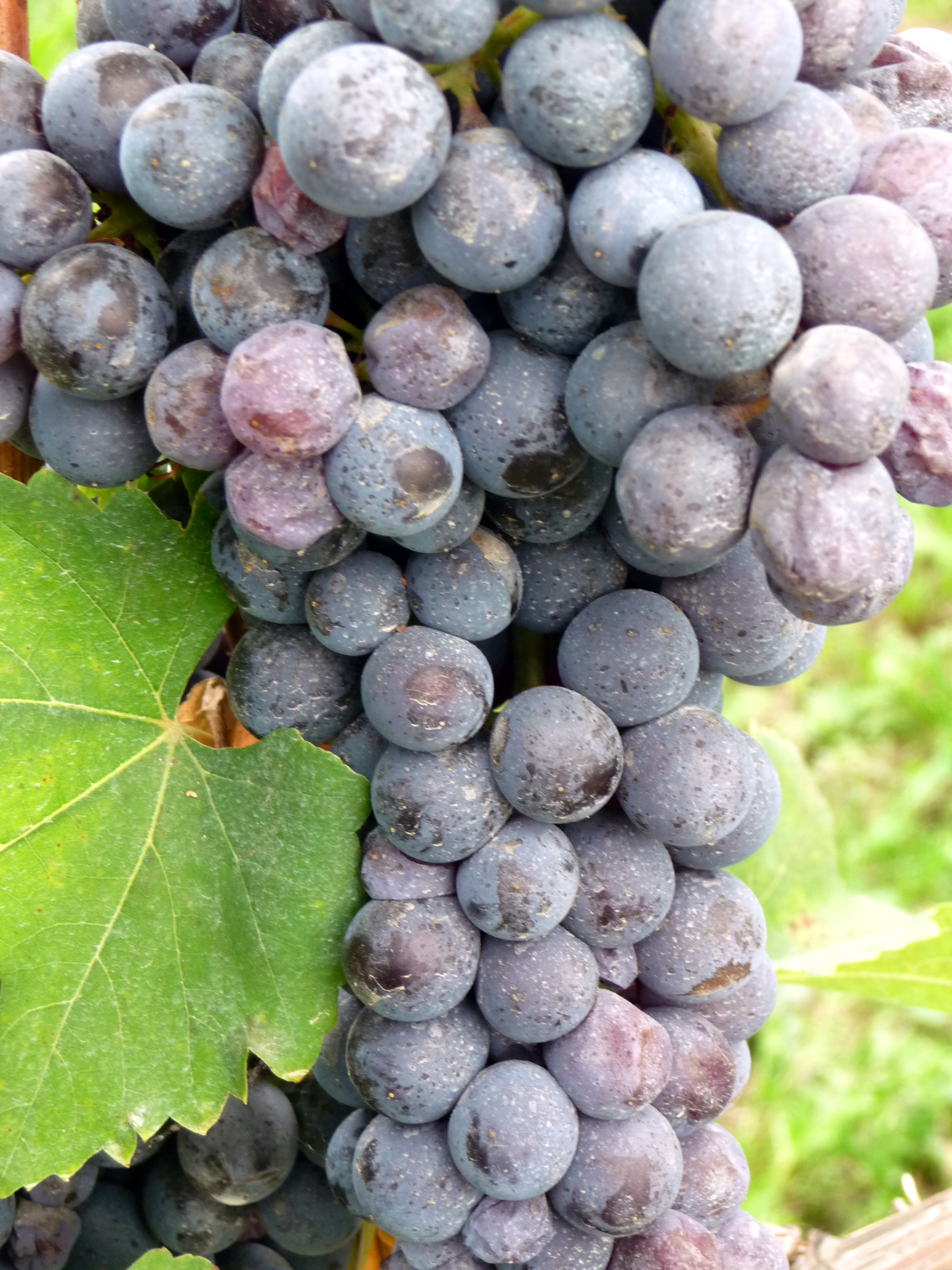
- A cluster of Nebbiolo
- Color of berry skin: Noir
- Species: Vitis vinifera
- Also called: Nebieul
- Origin: Piedmont, Italy
- Notable regions: Piedmont
- Notable wines: Barolo, Barbaresco, Roero, Gattinara, Ghemme
- VIVC number: 8417

Nebbiolo (/ˌnɛbiˈoʊloʊ/, Italian: [nebˈbjɔːlo]; Piedmontese: nebieul [neˈbjøl]) is an Italian red wine grape variety predominantly associated with its native Piedmont region. It is used to produce the Denominazione di Origine Controllata e Garantita (DOCG) wines of Barolo, Barbaresco, Gattinara, Ghemme, and Roero, together with numerous DOC wines. Nebbiolo is thought to derive its name from the Italian nebbia or Piedmontese nebia, meaning 'fog'. During harvest, which generally takes place late in October, a deep, intense fog sets into the Langhe region where many Nebbiolo vineyards are located. Alternative explanations refer to the fog-like glaucous veil that forms over the berries as they reach maturity, or that perhaps the name is derived instead from the Italian word nobile, meaning 'noble'. Nebbiolo produces lightly-colored red wines which can be highly tannic in youth with scents of tar and roses. As they age, the wines take on a characteristic brick-orange hue at the rim of the glass and mature to reveal other aromas and flavours such as violets, tar, wild herbs, cherries, raspberries, truffles, tobacco, and prunes. Nebbiolo wines can require years of ageing to balance the tannins with other characteristics.

== History ==
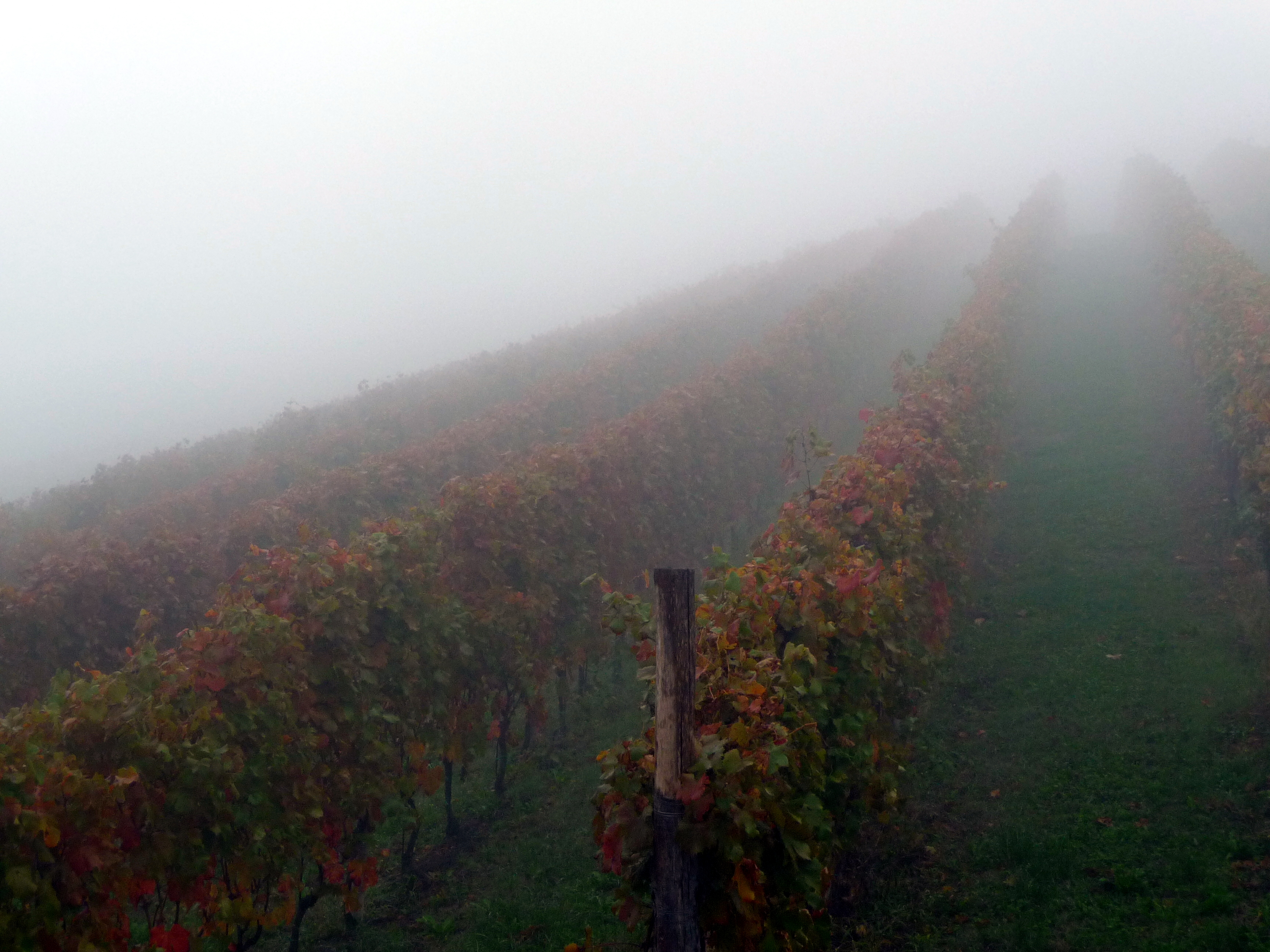
Early morning fog in a Nebbiolo vineyard in the Langhe. The Italian word for 'fog', nebbia, is one possible origin for the name Nebbiolo.

Ampelographers believe that Nebbiolo is indigenous to the Piedmont region, though there is some DNA evidence to suggest that it could have originated in the Valtellina area of northern Lombardy, just to the east. In the 1st century AD, Pliny the Elder noted the exceptional quality of the wine produced in the Pollentia region located northwest of what is now the Barolo DOCG zone. While Pliny does not explicitly name the grape responsible for these Pollenzo wines, his description of the wine bears similarities to later descriptions of Nebbiolo-based wines, making this potentially the first notation of wine made from Nebbiolo in the Piedmont region. The first explicit mention of Nebbiolo dates to 1268, in which a wine known as "nibiol" was described as growing in Rivoli near Turin. This was followed by a 1303 account of a producer in the Roero district described as having a barrel of "nebiolo" (sic). In the 1304 treatise Liber Ruralium Commodorum, the Italian jurist Pietro Crescenzi described wine made from "nubiola" as being of excellent quality. In the 15th century, statutes in the region of La Morra (in what is now the Barolo zone) demonstrated the high esteem that the Nebbiolo vine had in the area. According to these laws, the penalties for cutting down a Nebbiolo vine ranged from a heavy fine to having the right hand cut off or hanging for repeat offenders.

The grape first captured attention outside Piedmont in the 18th century, when the British were looking for alternative wine sources to Bordeaux due to prolonged political conflicts with the French. However, the lack of easy transport from Piedmont to London would keep the Piedmontese wine from having the enduring relationship with British connoisseurship that is associated with Bordeaux, port and sherry. Nonetheless, plantings of Nebbiolo continued to grow during the 19th century until the phylloxera epidemic hit. With vast swaths of vineyards devastated by the pest, some vineyard owners decided to replant with different grape varieties, with Barbera being a significant beneficiary. Today, Nebbiolo covers around 9% of Piedmont vineyards, compared to the 30% occupied by Barbera.

=== Relationships with other varieties ===
In 2004, research at the University of California-Davis and Istituto Agrario di San Michele all’Adige found Nebbiolo to be related to Piedmont by way of two aromatic grape varieties – the Freisa grape of Piedmont and the French Rhone variety Viognier. This research further suggests a parent-offspring relationship between Nebbiolo and several Italian grapes including Freisa, Bubbierasco, Nebbiolo Rosé, and Vespolina of the Piedmont region, and the Lombardy grapes Negrara and Rossola nera. Additional DNA analysis also suggest a parent-offspring relationship with the Lombardy grape Brugnola, previously thought to be only a synonym for the Emilia-Romagna grape Fortana.

== Viticulture ==
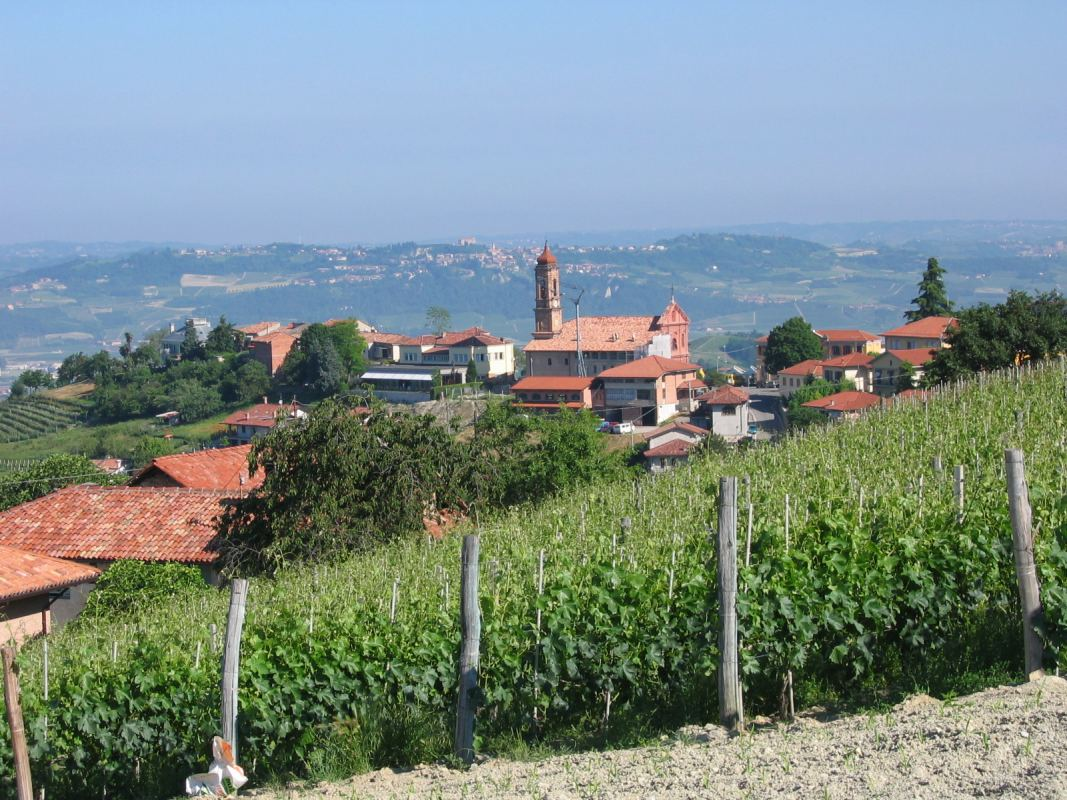
Nebbiolo has a long history in the Alba region of Piedmont.

Compared to the annual growth cycle of other Piedmontese grape varieties, Nebbiolo is one of the first varieties to bud and the last variety to ripen with harvest taking place in mid to late October. In some vintages, producers are able to pick and complete fermentation of their Barbera and Dolcetto plantings before Nebbiolo is even harvested. To aid in ripening, producers will often plant Nebbiolo in the most favoured sites on south and southwestern-facing slopes, which give the grape more access to direct sunlight. The most ideal location is at an elevation between 150 and 300 meters (500 and 1,000 ft) and must provide some natural shelter from wind. The vine is very susceptible to coulure, especially if there is wet weather during budbreak or flowering. While rains during this period can affect yield and quantity, rains that occur after the period of veraison can have a detrimental effect on quality. The most highly rated bottles of Piedmont Nebbiolo tend to come from vintages that had dry weather during September and October. Nebbiolo needs sufficient warmth to develop the sugars and fruit flavours needed to balance the grape's naturally high acidity and tannins. In cooler climate areas, such as the subalpine regions of Carema, Valtellina and Donnaz, the grape will produce medium bodied wines with bracing acidity and tannins that need the benefit of a warm vintage.

Nebbiolo does not adapt particularly well to various vineyard soil types, preferring soils with high concentrations of calcareous marl such as those found on the right bank of the Tanaro river around Alba where Barolo and Barbaresco are produced. The grape can thrive in sandy soils, such as those on the left bank of the Tanaro around the Roero district but the wines from this soil type tend not to be as perfumed – lacking in particular the classic tar aromas. The slightly acidic pH of the sandy Roero soils tend to produce early maturing wines. The lighter wines of Ghemme and Gattinara come from the acidic porphyry soils of the hills between Novara and Vercelli. In the lower Aosta Valley, the soil has a high concentration of granite while the soils of the Valtellina region of Lombardy are predominantly schist based. In addition to soil type, the drainage ability and concentration of magnesium and potassium can have an influencing effect on the type of Nebbiolo wine produced.

=== Clones ===
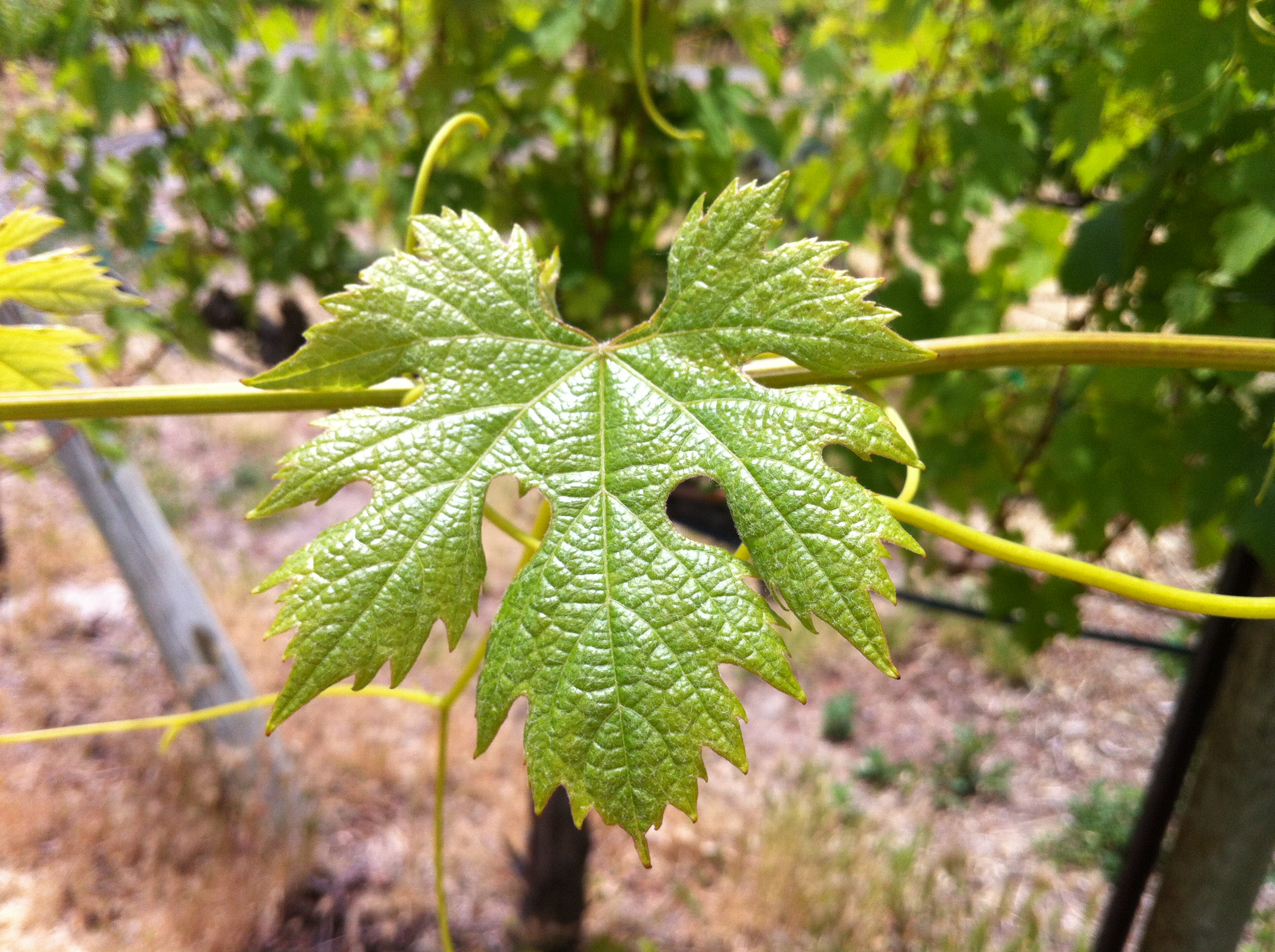
Nebbiolo leaf growing at Red Willow Vineyard in Washington State

Like many varieties (such as Pinot noir) with ancient pedigree, the Nebbiolo vine is genetically unstable and prone to mutation. As of 2001, there were around 40 different clones of Nebbiolo identified. The three main phenotypes used for winemaking are Lampia, Michet and Nebbiolo Rosé.

While Nebbiolo Rosé was originally thought to be a Nebbiolo clone, DNA research has later shown it to be a separate grape variety that has a parent-offspring relationship with Nebbiolo. Although the DOCG regulations for Barolo and Barbaresco require the wines to be made from Nebbiolo only, Nebbiolo Rosé remains permitted in practice. Its impact is limited by the fact that Nebbiolo Rosé had fallen out of favour long before the discovery that it was a separate variety, due, in part, to its wine's light colouring. Consequently, Nebbiolo Rosé accounts for only a small percentage of the vines grown for the production of Barolo and Barbaresco. Moreover, there are only a few bottlings where its presence is known to be significant.

The Lampia strain adapts best to different soil types. Perhaps due to inbreeding in Nebbiolo's lineage, the vine is very prone to grape diseases caused by viruses. Viral infection of the Lampia genotype originally gave rise to the Michet phenotype (though the Michet clones now cultivated are free from the virus). While Michet adapts less readily to different soil types, its smaller bunches and lower yields makes for highly concentrated wines. In many vineyards, producers will maintain a variety of Nebbiolo clones in order to maximize their wines' complexity.

== Winemaking ==
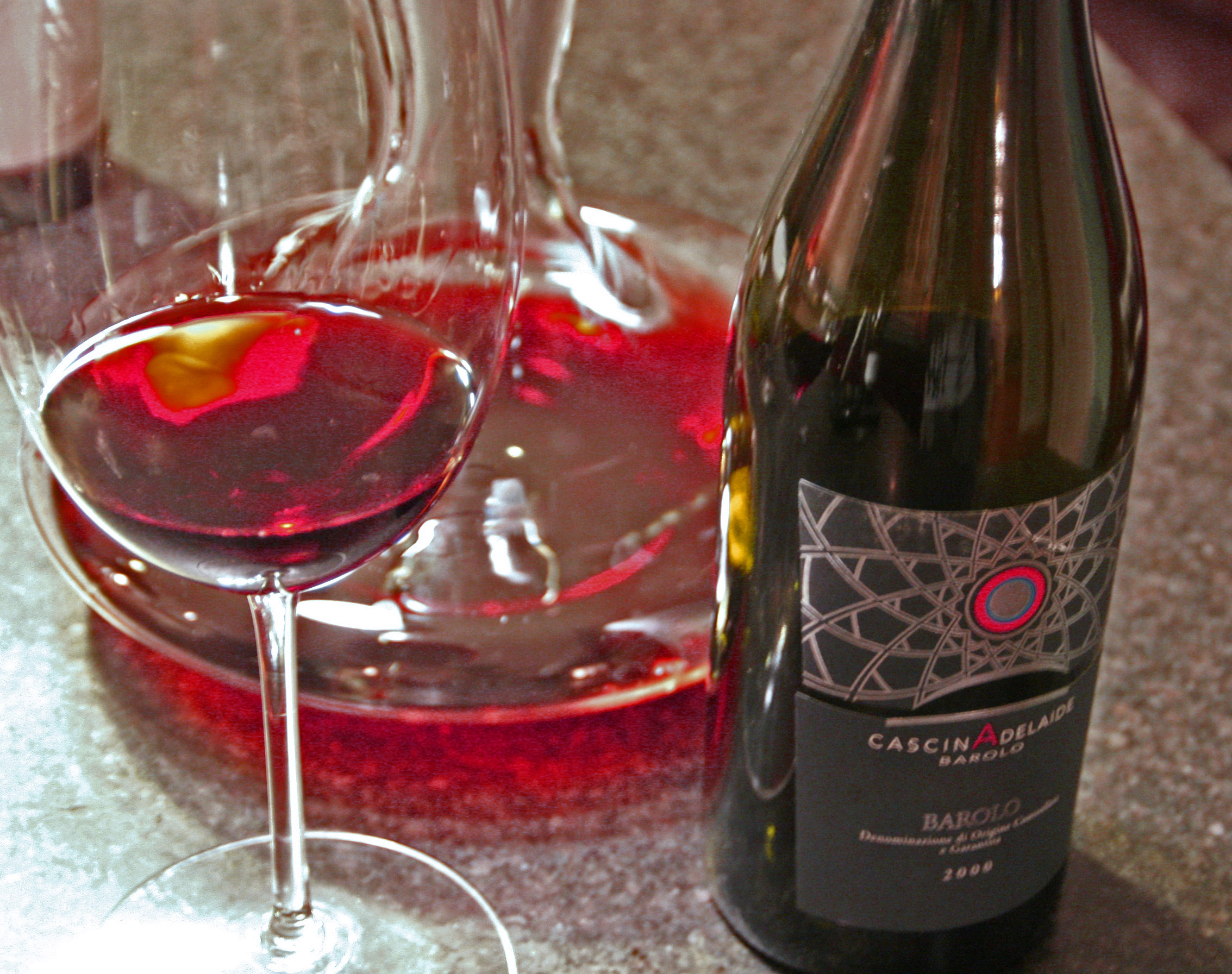
Nebbiolo has a traditionally light ruby red color in its youth.

In the most notable expression of Nebbiolo, the wines of Barolo, there is a division between what is considered a "traditional" approach to Nebbiolo and a "modernist" approach. The roots of both styles can trace their history to the early "pre-technology" production of Nebbiolo. Prior to the advent of temperature-controlled fermentation, the late harvest dates for Nebbiolo meant that the wines began fermentation when the weather turned cold. These cool temperatures would delay fermentation for several days, extending the maceration period and extraction of phenolic compounds such as tannins. When fermentation did begin, temperatures would reach excessive levels of 95-100 °F (35-38 °C), which would drastically reduce potential aromas and flavours. With the high levels of tannins, these early Barolos would require five years or more of ageing in oak barrels to soften some of the astringency. Lack of understanding of proper hygiene led to less sanitary conditions than what both traditional and modernist producers maintain today. Those conditions led to the development of bacterial infection of cement fermentation tanks and old wood barrels, which contributed to the development of off flavours and potential wine faults that would require at least 24 hours decanting to alleviate.

Today's winemaking for both traditionalists and modernists includes strict hygiene controls and the use of some modern winemaking equipment. Rather than fall into one hardline camp or the other, many producers take a middle-ground approach that utilizes some modernist techniques along with traditional winemaking. In general, the traditional approach to Nebbiolo involves long maceration periods of 20 to 30 days and the use of older large botti size barrels. The modern approach to Nebbiolo utilizes shorter maceration periods of 7 to 10 days and cooler fermentation temperatures between 82 and 86 °F (28 and 30 °C) that preserve fruit flavours and aromas. Towards the end of the fermentation period, the cellars are often heated to encourage the start of malolactic fermentation which softens some of Nebbiolo's harsh acidity. Modern winemakers tend to favour smaller barrels of new oak that need only a couple of years to soften the tannic grip of the wines. As new oak imparts notes of vanilla, it has the potential to cover up the characteristic rose notes of Nebbiolo.

=== Blending ===
In the Piedmont region, there is a long history of blending other grape varieties with Nebbiolo in order to add colour and/or soften the grape's harsh tannins. In addition to the use of red wine grapes such as Barbera, Croatina, and Bonarda Piemontese, white wine grapes such Arneis and Favorita also have a history of being blended with Nebbiolo. Historically, the association of blending Arneis with Nebbiolo was so strong that a common synonym of the former is Barolo Bianco or "white Barolo". Today, the DOCG regulations for Barolo and Barbaresco call for the wine to be a 100% varietal of Nebbiolo. In 1998, producers of the Barbaresco region drafted a proposal to allow 10-15% of other grape varieties into the wine, but bad press by Italian wine critics led to the rejection of that plan. While there is some speculation, from critics such as Oz Clarke, that Barbera or even Syrah and Cabernet Sauvignon may be used to augment the colour and flavours of Barolos by some producers, there is no explicit proof that this is occurring.

For the Nebbiolo-based wines of the Roero DOC, between 2 and 5% of Arneis is permitted in the blend, but the majority of producers rarely use this allowance. Similarly, many producers in Ghemme and Gattinara who are allowed some blending of Vespolina, Croatina, and Bonarda opt instead to use nearly 100% Nebbiolo. In the Valtellina region of Lombardy Merlot, Pinot nero, Pignola, Prugnolo, and Rossola are permitted blending partners for Nebbiolo.

== Wine regions ==
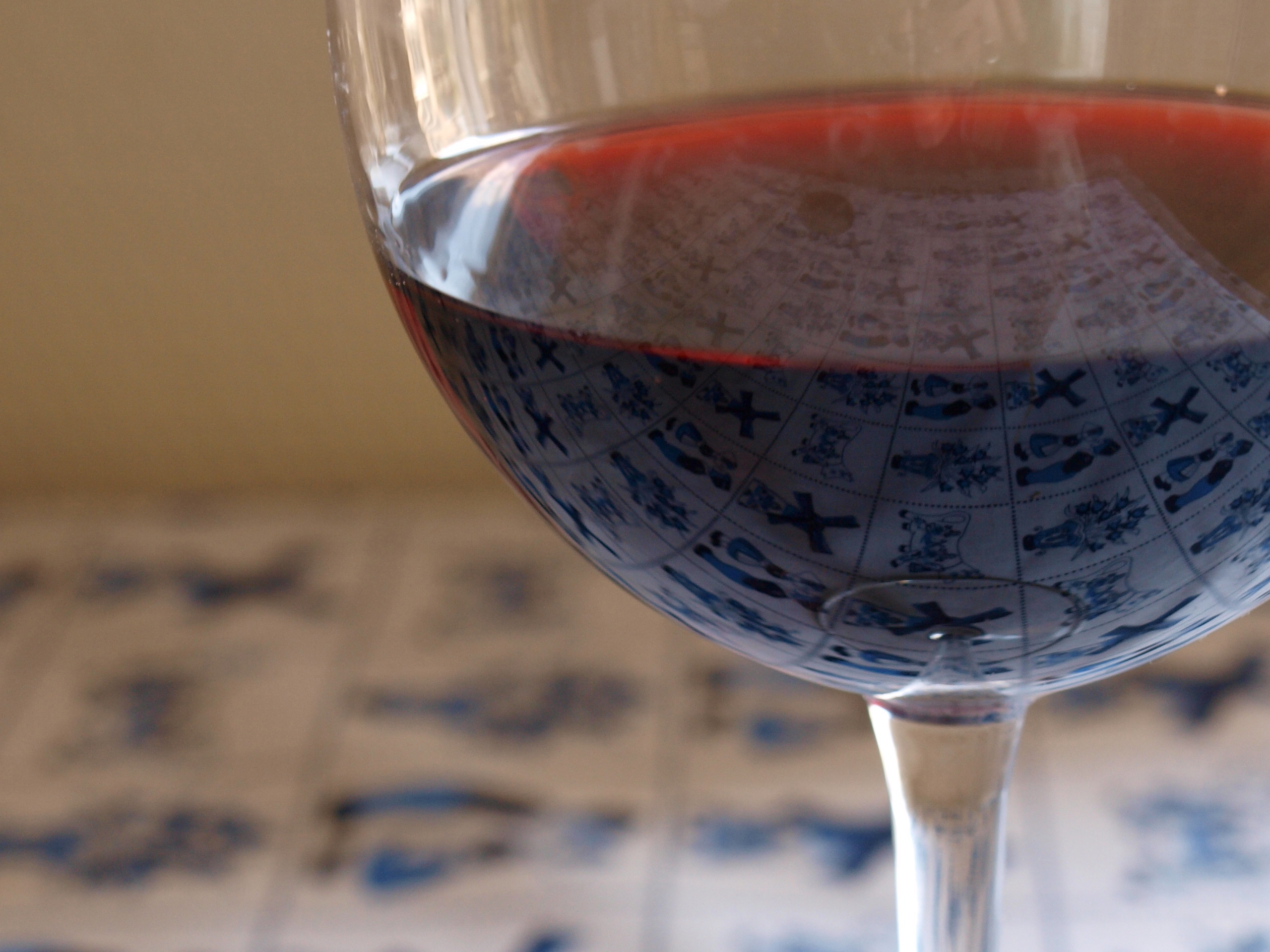
A glass of Barolo

Nebbiolo is grown on 5,993 hectares (14,810 acres) of land globally as of 2010, with all but 457 hectares (1,130 acres) found in the northwest Italian region of Piedmont, where it forms the base of many of the regions most well known DOC and DOCG wines including Barolo, Barbaresco, Gattinara, Ghemme and Nebbiolo d'Alba. Despite the prestige and acclaim of Nebbiolo-based wine, it is far from being the most widely grown grape in Piedmont. In 2010, there were 5,536 hectares (13,680 acres) of Nebbiolo producing 125,000 hectolitres (2,700,000 imp gal; 3,300,000 US gal) of wine which accounted for a little over 3% of Piedmont's entire production. In contrast, there is nearly 15 times as much Barbera planted in the region. Outside Piedmont, it is found in the neighbouring regions of the Val d'Aosta region of Donnaz and Valtellina and Franciacorta in Lombardy. In the Veneto, there is a small amount which some producers use to make a Nebbiolo recioto wine.

Outside Italy, producers in the United States are experimenting with plantings totalling 68 hectares (170 acres) in California, Washington, Oregon and even Virginia. In the Northern Region of Baja California, Mexico, 180 hectares (440 acres) support the production of the Nebbiolo varietal. In Argentina there are 49 hectares (120 acres) planted in the San Juan province and Australian producers in the King Valley region of Victoria have found some success with 98 hectares (240 acres) of Nebbiolo plantings. Success has also been found in the Geographe Wine Region of Western Australia. Nebbiolo is also grown in smaller amounts in South Africa, Uruguay and Chile.

=== Barolo & Barbaresco ===
The Piedmont region is considered the viticultural home of Nebbiolo and it is where the grape's most notable wines are made. The consistent continental climate of the region, coupled with the influences of the Tanaro River produces a unique terroir for Nebbiolo that is not easily replicated in other parts of the world. The two most well-known Nebbiolo-based wines are the DOCG wines of the Barolo & Barbaresco zones near Alba. Barbaresco is considered the lighter of the two and has less stringent DOCG regulations, with the normale bottlings requiring only 9 months in oak and 21 months of total ageing and the riserva bottlings requiring 45 total months of ageing. In contrast the Barolo DOCG requires 18 months in oak and 3 years total ageing for normale bottlings and 62 months total ageing for riserva. The minimum alcohol levels for the two regions vary slightly with Barbaresco requiring a minimum of 12.5% and Barolo 13%.(However, Barolo, as of 1999, now only requires a minimum of 12.5% as well)

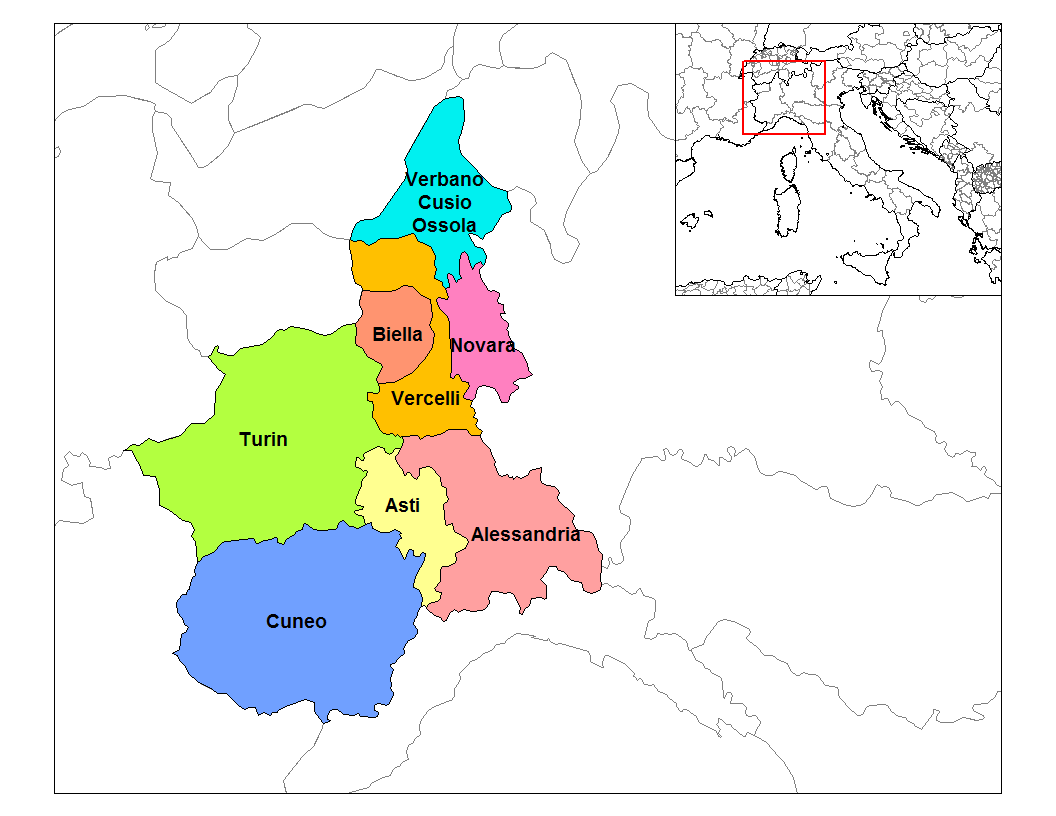
Nebbiolo planted in Novara and Vercelli region of northern Piedmont tend to produce lighter and earthier wines.

The Barolo zone is three times the size of the Barbaresco zone with the different communes producing Nebbiolo-based wines with noticeable distinctions among them. In the commune of Castiglione Falletto, the wines are more powerful and concentrated with the potential for finesse. Nebbiolo grown in Monforte d'Alba has a firm tannic structure and the most potential for ageing. The Serralunga region produces the heaviest, full-bodied Nebbiolo wines and is also the last region to start its harvest, often two weeks after other areas have begun picking. These three regions located on the eastern edge of the zone have soils that are dominated by sand and limestone. In the west, the communes of La Morra and Barolo have soils dominated by chalk and marl and produce wines that are more perfumed and silkier in texture. Throughout both the Barolo and Barbaresco zones are deposits of clay which add considerable tannins to Nebbiolo.

=== Rest of Piedmont and Italy ===
Outside Barolo & Barbaresco, Nebbiolo is found in the DOCG wines of Ghemme and Gattinara in the Novara and Vercelli hills of northern Piedmont. In these regions, the grape is known as Spanna and tends to produce lighter, more earthy wines. Rather than mandate a 100% Nebbiolo, producers are allowed to blend a small percentage of Bonarda, Croatina and Vespolina though most modern producers favour a high percentage of Nebbiolo. In the northwestern corner of Piedmont, near the Valle d'Aosta, the cool climate of Carema DOC produces Nebbiolo wines with much perfume but in some vintages will have difficulties with ripeness. In the Roero district located across the Tanaro River from Barolo and Barbaresco, the wines tend to be less tannic and lighter while those produced in nearby Alba under the Nebbiolo d'Alba DOC can have more complexity and body.

Outside Piedmont, there are significant plantings of Nebbiolo in the Lombardy region of Valtellina where the grape is known as Chiavennasca. The high yields and sub-alpine climate tend to produce Nebbiolo lacking ripeness with bracing acidity. Nebbiolo is also used to make a deeply concentrated Amarone-type wine known as Sfursat. In the Franciacorta, Nebbiolo is a permitted grape variety along with Barbera, Cabernet Franc and Merlot in the rosso wines of the region. Northwest of Piedmont, in the Valle Aosta, some Nebbiolo is grown in the Donnaz region near the border with Carema.

=== United States ===
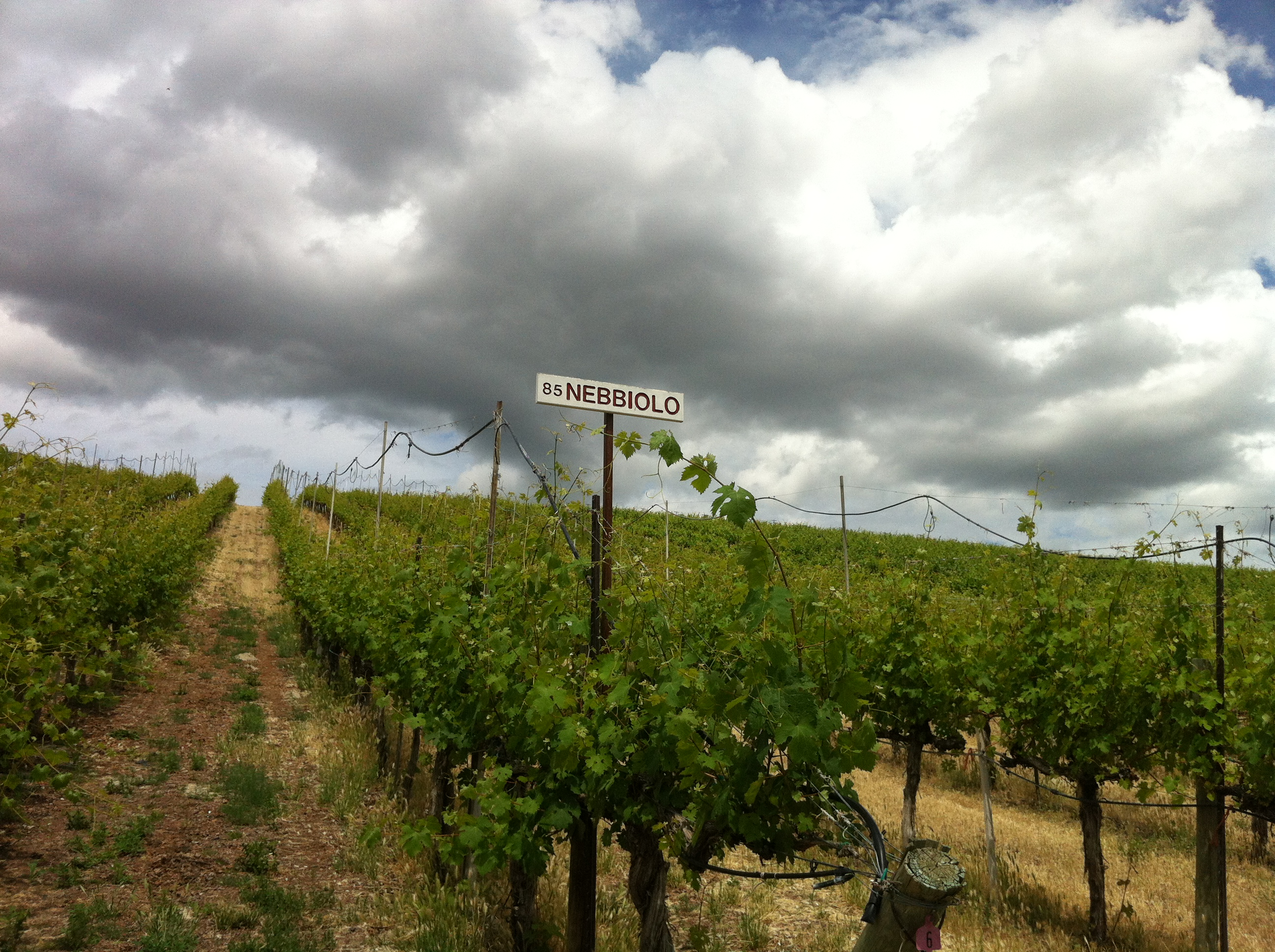
The original 1985 Nebbiolo plantings at Red Willow Vineyard in Washington State

In California, the influence of Italian immigrants in the early history of the state's wine industry introduced Nebbiolo to the United States in the 19th century. As Cabernet Sauvignon and Merlot increased in popularity in the 20th century, Nebbiolo—as well as other Italian grape varieties—steadily decreased in plantings. Today there are scattered plantings of Nebbiolo throughout the state with the majority located in the jug wine producing region of the Central Valley. As California wine producers aim to produce higher quality wines, there have been difficulties in locating ideally suited sites for Nebbiolo and the progress in producing world-class California Nebbiolo is considerably behind that of other Italian varietals like Sangiovese, Primitivo and even Barbera and Dolcetto. In Washington State, Nebbiolo was first planted in the Red Willow Vineyard in the Yakima Valley AVA in 1985 with the first varietal release in 1987. As in California, Washington producers are still trying to figure out which sites are best suited to grow Nebbiolo. While the wine is mainly produced as a varietal, some producers make blends with Dolcetto and Syrah added in.

=== Australia ===
In Australia, winemakers found little early success with Nebbiolo as many of the earliest plantings were inland sites that turned out to be too warm and dry for the grape. Research into cooler-climate sites leads to more favourable examples coming from the marginal climate of Victoria's King Valley, and the cooler Adelaide Hills. Further studies have indicated that the Mornington Peninsula and the Margaret River areas have similar amounts of rainfall, relative humidity and sunshine hours to the Langhe region of Piedmont. Bendigo, the Clare Valley and Mudgee, are also currently being explored for their Nebbiolo potential. There are now hundreds of Nebbiolo wines produced in Australia, mainly from Victoria's north-east regions, and the Yarra Valley, and South Australia, in particular the Adelaide Hills. Australian styles produced can be from very light, almost clear, to dark, rich wines.

Nebbiolo has attracted some Australian growers and makers over the years, and they have produced some very good examples of the grape. In most cases, the Australian regions where the variety does best tend to be ones where clouds of fog are not an uncommon sight in autumn and winter – inland and up high.

=== Other regions ===
In Ensenada, Mexico, producers (L.A. Cetto) have been experimenting with plantings of Nebbiolo in Baja California near the US border with promising results. There are 100% Nebbiolo wines produced from low-yielding plants with very good colour and fine qualities, like the wine produced at Arcilla. In South America, early results in Chile have so far produced wines with high acidity and poor colour as winemakers work to find which clones are best suited for their climate. The development of Argentine Nebbiolo has been held back by excessively high yields. In Europe, there are some plantings in the Austrian region of Mittelburgenland. In South Africa, the first clones were imported in 1910 by Abraham Izak Perold but was not cultivated as a single varietal until the 1990s and there has been fewer than 25 hectares being recorded in 2016.

== Wines ==
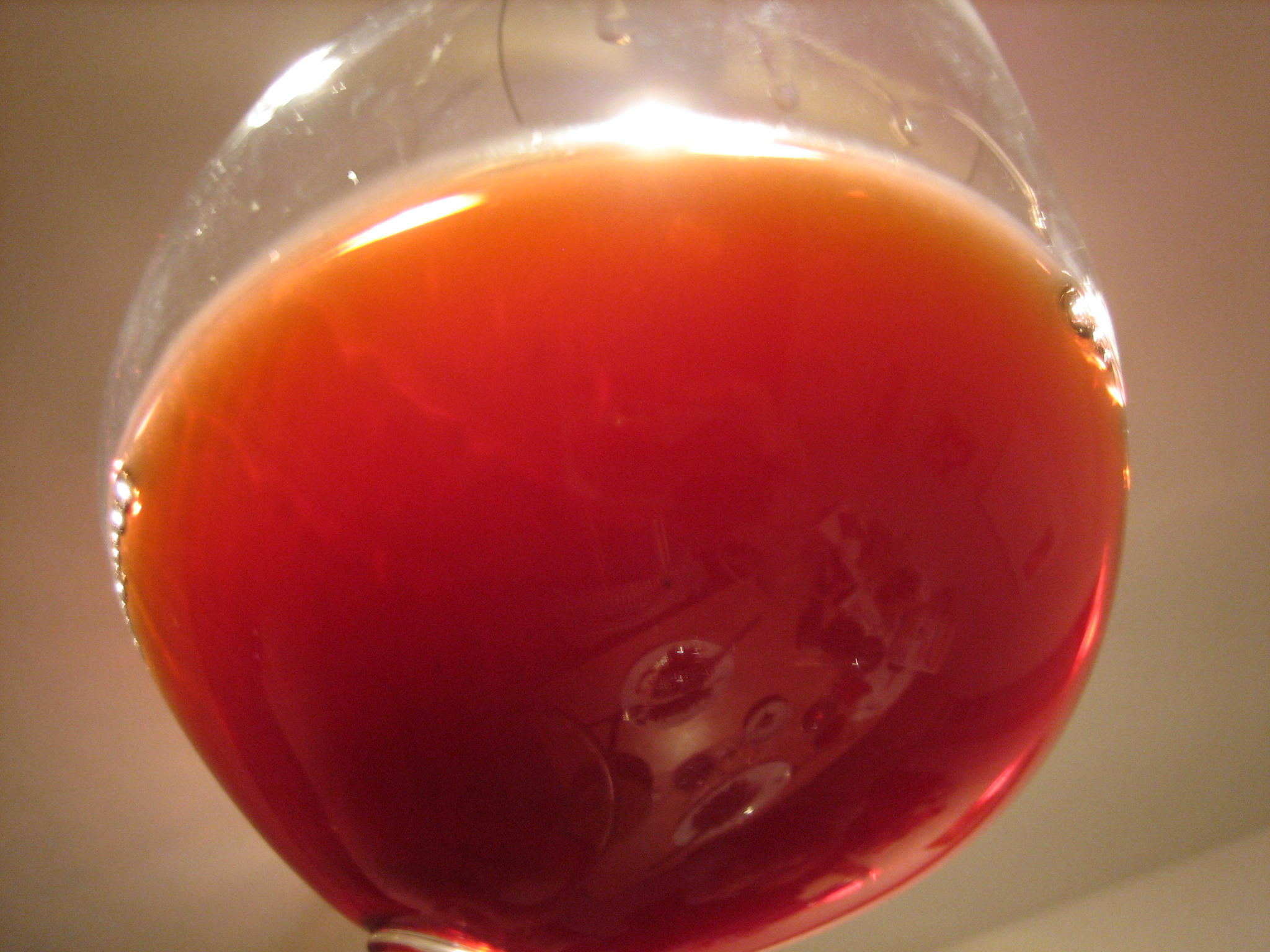
Barbaresco, like Barolo, has the potential for longevity. This wine is from the 1976 vintage and has taken on the characteristic orange hues of an aged Nebbiolo.

Wines made from Nebbiolo are characterized by their ample amounts of acidity and tannin. Most examples are wines built for ageing and some of the highest quality vintages need significant age (at least a decade or more) before they are palatable to many wine drinkers and can continue to improve in the bottle for upward of 30 years. As Nebbiolo ages, the bouquet becomes more complex and appealing with aromas of tar and roses being the two most common notes. Other aromas associated with Nebbiolo include dried fruit, damsons, leather, licorice, mulberries, spice as well dried and fresh herbs. While Barolo & Barbaresco tend to be the heaviest and most in need of ageing, wines made in the modernist style are becoming more approachable at a young age. Lighter styles from Carema, Langhe and Gattinara tend to be ready to drink within a few years of vintage. Nebbiolo from California and Australia will vary from producer and quality of vineyard.

== Synonyms ==
Nebbiolo has a wide range of synonyms used in various local districts of northwest Italy. In the areas of Novara and Vercelli it is known widely as Spanna. In the Val d'Aosta region and around Carema it is known as Picutener. In Valtellina it is known as Chiavennasca.

The Nebbiolo grape variety is also known under the name Barbesino, Brunenta, Femmina, Lampia, Marchesana, Martesana Melasca, Melaschetto, Melascone, Michet, Monferrina, Morsano di Caraglio, Nebbieul grosso, Nebbieul Maschio, Nebbiolin, Nebbiolin Canavesano, Nebbiolin lungo, Nebbiolin nero, Nebieu, Nebieul, Nebieul fumela, Nebiolo, Nebiolo du Piedmont, Nibieul burghin, Nibio, Nibiol, Nubiola, Pantin, Picot, Picotendre, Picotendro, Picote, Picotenero, Picoultener, Picoutendro Maschio, Počte, Prugnet, Prunent, Prunenta, Pugnet, Rosetta, Spagna, Span, Spana commune, Spana grossa and Uva Spanna.

== See also ==
- International variety
- List of Italian grape varieties
