= Lombardy wine =

Italian wine produced in Lombardy, Italy

Lombardy
- Wine region
- Type: Italian wine
- Year established: 1967
- Years of wine industry: 1967-present
- Country: Italy
- Soil conditions: Calcareous, clay, glacial moraine
- Grapes produced: 45% white varieties, 55% red varieties
- Varietals produced: Red: Nebbiolo, Barbera, Bonarda, Merlot, Cabernet Sauvignon; White: Pinot Bianco, Chardonnay, Trebbiano, Moscato, Riesling Italico
- Official designations: 3 DOCGs: Franciacorta, Sforzato di Valtellina, Oltrepò Pavese Metodo Classico; 17+ DOCs including Valtellina, Lugana, Oltrepò Pavese; Several IGTs including Lombardia IGT

Location of Lombardy wine region in Italy

Lombardy wine is the Italian wine produced in the Lombardy region of north central Italy. The region is known particularly for its sparkling wines made in the Franciacorta and Oltrepò Pavese areas. Lombardy also produces still red, white and rosé wines made from a variety of local and international grapes, including Nebbiolo wines in the Valtellina region and Trebbiano di Lugana white wines produced with the Chiaretto style rosé along the shores of Lake Garda. The wine region currently has 22 denominazione di origine controllata (DOC), 5 denominazione di origine controllata e garantita (DOCG) and at least 13 indicazione geografica tipica (IGT) designations. The main cities of the region are Milan, Bergamo and Brescia. The region annually produces around 1.3 million hectolitres of wine, more than the regions of Friuli-Venezia Giulia, Marche, Trentino-Alto Adige/Südtirol and Umbria.

== History ==
The winemaking tradition of Lombardy (approx. 23,2% of primary sector) dates back to its settlement by Greeks from Athens along the Po river. Archaeological evidence suggest that these settlers traded wine with the Etruscans in nearby Tuscany. In the late 19th century, the Italian wine writer C. B. Cerletti wrote a book for the French market that described the wines of Italy. Of the wines of Lombardy, he noted that the Valtellina were still being made in a Greek style and the wines of Oltrepò Pavese were the preferred wines of the Milanese.

== Climate and geography ==
The climate of Lombardy is varied due to the diverse terrain of the region, but is generally considered a "cool" continental climate. The region is influenced by several geographic features that control the climate and terroir of the land. These include the Alps located in the northern parts of the region near the wine-producing area of Valtellina and the Po River, which runs along the Oltrepò Pavese (whose name means "Pavia across the Po") and forms most of the region's southern border with Emilia-Romagna. Many wine areas are located near some of Lombardy's major lakes, including Franciacorta near Lake Iseo as well as the Garda Bresciano and Garda Mantovano regions near Lake Garda. To the west of Lombardy is the Piedmont wine region, to the south is Emilia-Romagna and to the east are the Trentino-Alto Adige/Südtirol and Veneto wine regions.

== Wine regions ==
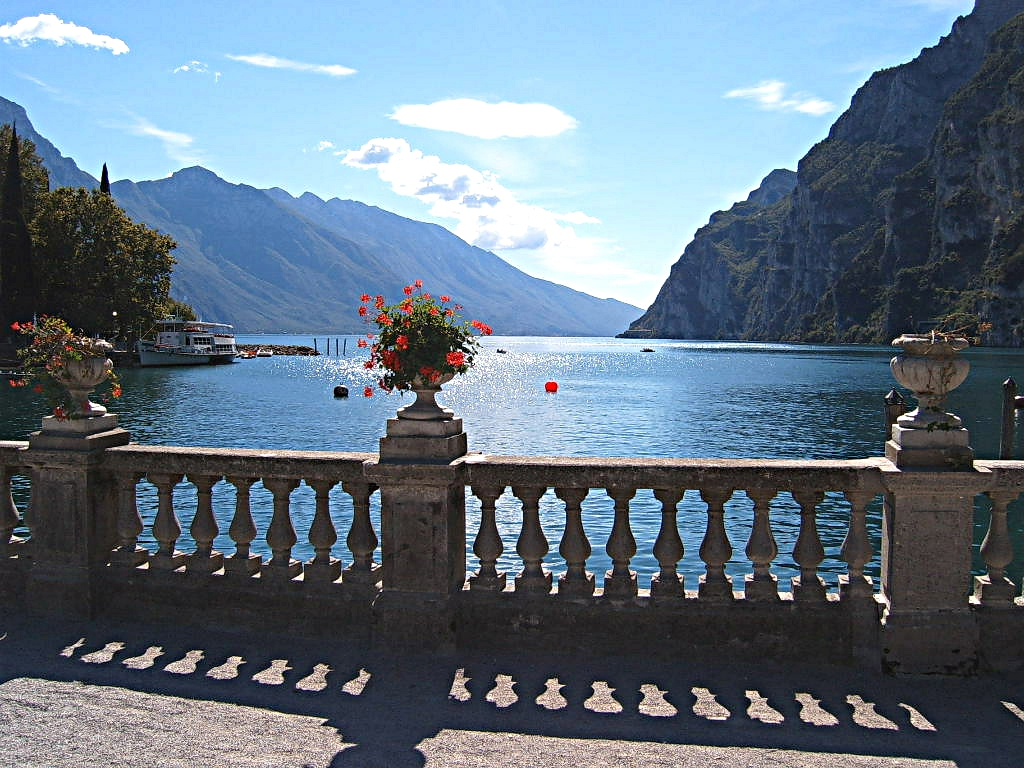
Lake Garda from near the Garda Bresciano wine region

The Lombardy region consists primarily of 13 wine-producing areas (from north-south):

- Valtellina – located along the Adda River in the Alps
- Garda Bresciano – located along Lake Garda
- Valcelepio – located around the city of Bergamo
- Franciacorta – located along Lake Iseo
- Cellatica – located near Franciacorta in the province of Brescia
- Botticino – located east of Brescia
- Capriano del Colle – located southwest of Brescia
- San Martino della Battaglia –located along Lake Garda south of Garda Bresciano
- Lugana – located along Lake Garda southeast of San Martino della Battaglia
- Garda Mantovano – located along Lake Garda in the province of Mantua
- San Colombano al Lambro – located in the province of Milan along the border with the province of Pavia
- Lambrusco Mantovano – located in the province of Mantua along the border with Emilia-Romagna. Produces Lambrusco wine.
- Oltrepò Pavese – located in that part of the province of Pavia which lies to the south of the river Po and is bordered by the Emilia-Romagna and Piedmont regions

=== Valtellina ===
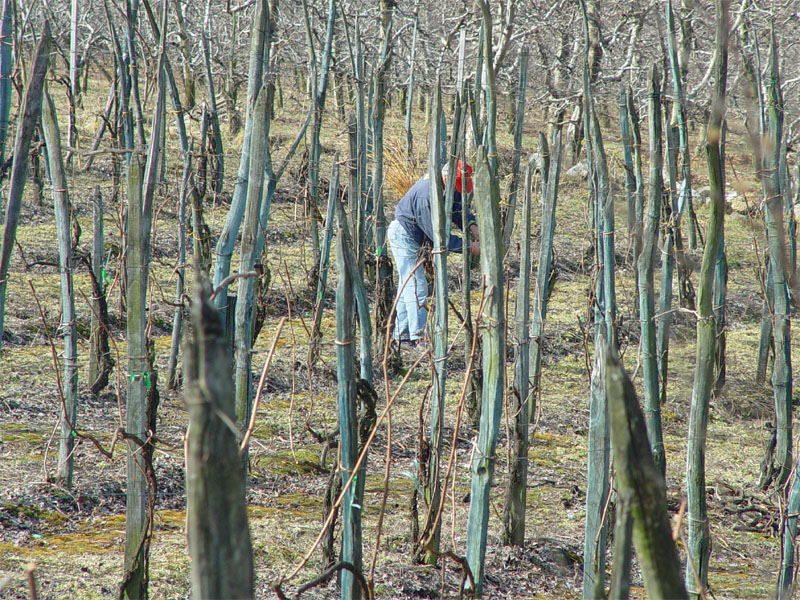
Valtellina vineyards are mostly worked by hand. The long stakes next to the vine aid in minimizing the effects of soil erosion and landslides.

This northernmost wine region of Lombardy has been producing wine since the 5th century and is found in the valley of Adda River traveling west to east through the Alps. The vineyards in this area are located at high altitudes around 2,500 feet. For most of its history, the Valtellina region's primary market was Switzerland to the north. In recent times it has garnered international attention for being the only major Italian region to focus on the Nebbiolo grape, locally known as Chiavennasca, outside of the Piedmont region.

The vineyards of the region are located on the south-facing slopes along the Adda river. The nearby mountain peaks provide protection from cold, harsh winds and help to trap heat in the valley. The stony vineyard soil also retains heat and releases it during the night to warm the vines. This creates an optimum situation which allows the Nebbiolo grape to fully develop its flavors during the long growing season it needs. The steep location of the vineyards makes mechanical harvesting difficult so most vineyards are tended by hand which increases the cost and limits production. Heavy winter rainfall poses the hazards of landslides and soil erosion.

The red wines of the Valtellina regions are typically light to medium bodied. The Nebbiolos are noticeably less tannic and acidic than their Piedmont counterparts. The Valtellina DOC includes the basic level wines while the Valtellina Superiore DOCG include wines from the more premium locations and must be aged a minimum of two years. The Valtellina Superiore Riserva are reserve-style wines that must be aged for at least four years. Valtellina also produces an Amarone-style DOCG wine known as Sforzato (or Sfursat, Sfurzat as alternate dialect names) made from dried grapes with a minimum alcohol content of 14.5%.

The Valtellina grape Rossola nera that is permitted as a minor blending component in the DOC wines of the region is an offspring of Nebbiolo. Another wine grape, Rossolino nero, that is thought to be an offspring of Rossola nera (and such a grandchild variety of Nebbiolo) is also grown in Valtellina.

=== Oltrepò Pavese ===
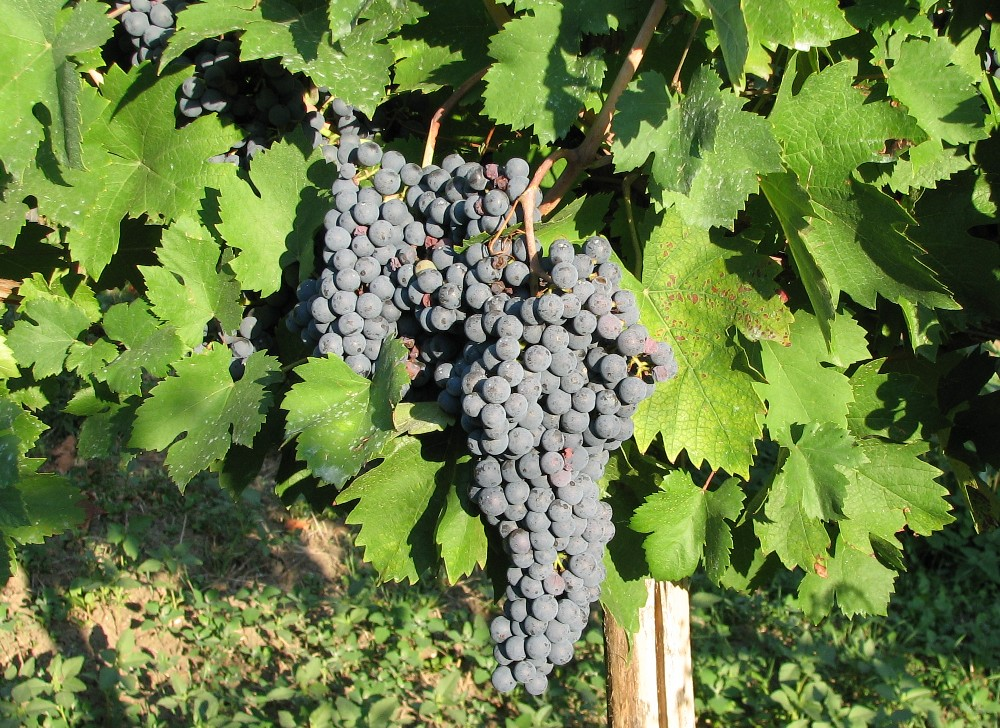
Croatina wine grapes in a vineyard of the Oltrepò Pavese

Archaeological findings testify the spread of the vine in Oltrepò Pavese already in Roman times and this culture was maintained during the early Middle Ages by the monks of Bobbio Abbey, who between 862 and 865 were owners of vineyards in the Staffora Valley. Since the XI-th century, the viticulture, thanks to the impulse of the great monasteries of Pavia, knew particular development above all in the first hill belt. Some ecclesiastical institutions, such as the monastery of San Pietro in Ciel d'Oro, which at least since 974 owned vineyards and winepresses near San Damiano al Colle, extended the culture of vine in the area, producing wines that, thanks to the Po and Ticino, were then transported to Pavia, where the part not absorbed by the consumption of the monks was destined for trade.

The Oltrepò Pavese region is responsible for more the half of all wine produced in the Lombardy region as well as two-thirds of its DOC-designated wines. This region along the Po Valley was once a part of the Piedmont but has always had Milan as its primary market. Today it produces a DOCG sparkling wine with its Pinot nero (Pinot noir) grapes and a rose sparkling wine denominated Cruase. In addition to sparkling wines, the Oltrepò Pavese also produces red wines from the Pinot nero, Barbera, Croatina, Uva Rara and Vespolina. There are some small plantings of Cabernet Sauvignon that are starting to appear as varietal wines. The white wines of the region are made from Riesling Italico (Welschriesling), Riesling (Riesling Renano), Chardonnay, Cortese, Malvasia, Moscato, Pinot grigio and Sauvignon blanc. The Pinot nero grape is also vinified as a rose and as a white, non-sparkling wine in addition to being made as a standard red wine.

The sparkling wines of the region are made in several styles. The wines labeled metodo classico are made according to the méthode champenoise of the Champagne region. The wines are composed primarily of Pinot nero with up to a 30% blend of Chardonnay, Pinot bianco and Pinot grigio. Slightly sparkling frizzante styles are made from several of the region's red and white wine grapes including the dry Buttafuoco style and the semi-sweet Sangue di Giuda (meaning Judas' blood) both made from the Croatina grape, known locally as Bonarda. The Moscato grape is also made into a frizzante style as well as liquoroso fortified wine and passito dessert wine.

=== Franciacorta ===
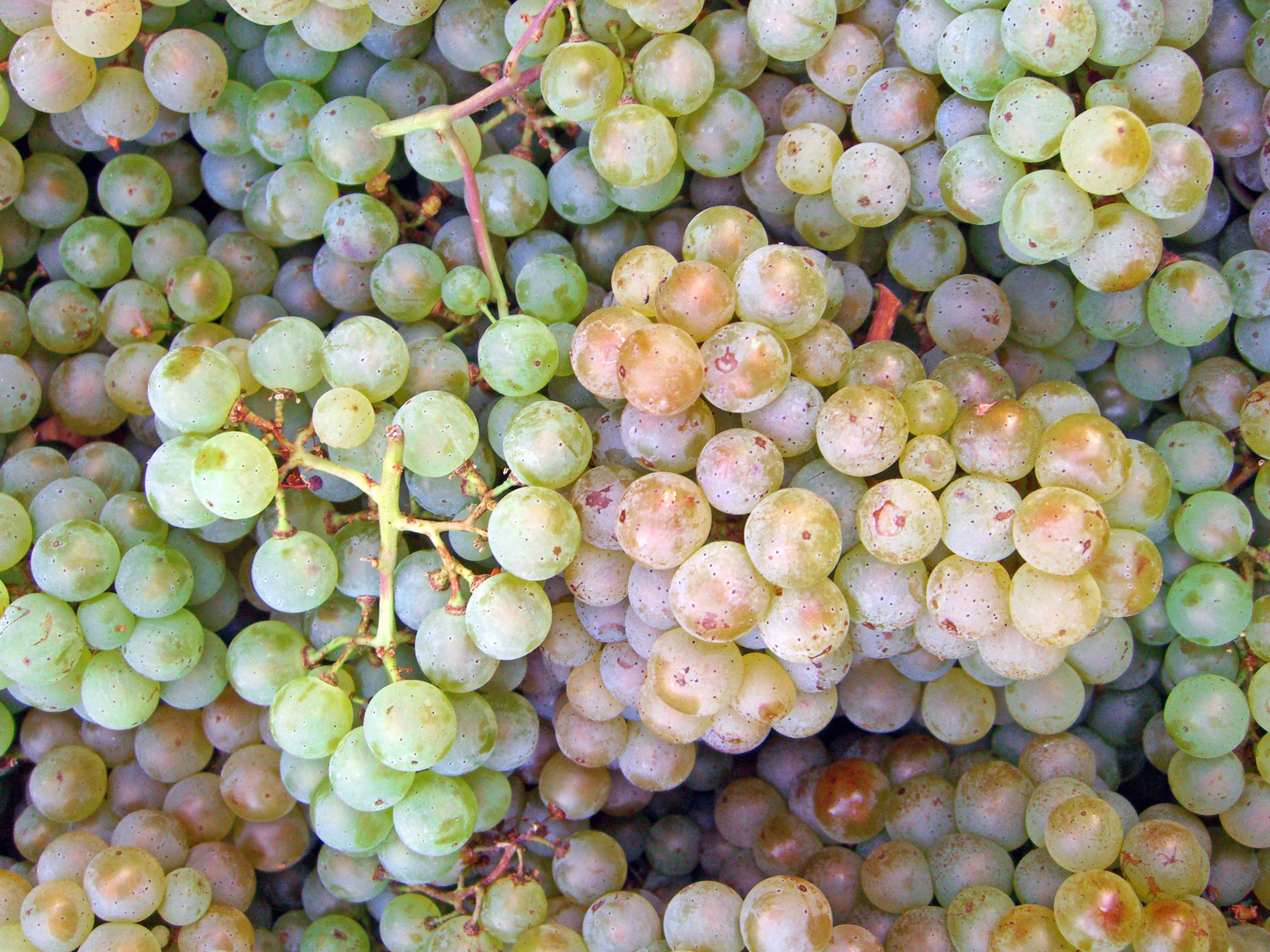
Pinot bianco grapes

The Franciacorta wine zone is responsible for some of Italy's most prestigious sparkling wines. Located along the shores of Lake Iseo, vineyards are planted in well-drained morainic soils. The area has a long history of producing still red and white wines but has gained most of its success in the last 40 years since it started producing sparkling wines. In 1995, the region received DOCG status and created a separate DOC, known as Terre di Franciacorta for its non-sparkling wines.

The sparkling wines of this area are composed primarily of the Chardonnay and Pinot bianco grape with a maximum 15% of Pinot nero allowed. The area has a Crémant style wine, known under the trademarked name Satèn, that has less carbon dioxide than the standard sparkling wine but is more "bubbly" than a frizzante. This wine is not allowed to have any Pinot nero in the blend. The rosé sparklers are required to have a minimum 15% Pinot nero. The vintage-dated wines are required to have a minimum of 85% grapes from the indicated vintage and must be aged for at least 30 months prior to release. Non-vintage wines must be aged for at least 18 months. The Franciacorta sparklers are often a little sweeter than Champagne with the brut style having up to 20 grams per litre of sugar, while brut Champagne can have no more than 15 grams.

While sparkling wine production accounts for more than half of the Franciacorta area's production, many producers have begun focusing on make red Bordeaux-style blends and Burgundian style Chardonnays aged in oak. Despite the frequent use of Pinot nero in the sparkling wines, a still Burgundian-style red Pinot nero is not permitted under the Terre di Franciacorta DOC.

== Other wines and grapes ==
The wine regions along Lake Garda are known for their Chiaretto style rosé wine made from a blend of Barbera, Groppello, Marzemino and Sangiovese. This dry wine is deeper in color than most rosés and typically has good acidity with very low alcohol levels. The Rosso (red) style wines are made with the same blend of grapes but in a darker, more full-bodied style. Varietal styles of Gropello are rich and tannic wines. The Lugana white wines are made from the Trebbiano grape and are known for their fruitiness and medium body. White wines from the San Martino della Battaglia are made from the Tocai Friuliano grape, which is best known for its use in the nearby Veneto region. The Garda Mantovano white wines are based on Trebbiano and Garganega and its red wines are made from Merlot and Molinara. Other Lombardy region wines include the sweet Moscato Passito from Valcalepio and the light red wines from the Schiava and Barbera grapes in the Cellatica and Botticino region.
