= Bonarda Piemontese =

Variety of grape

- Grape (Vitis)
- Species: Vitis vinifera
- Origin: Italy
- Notable regions: Piedmont
- VIVC number: 1543

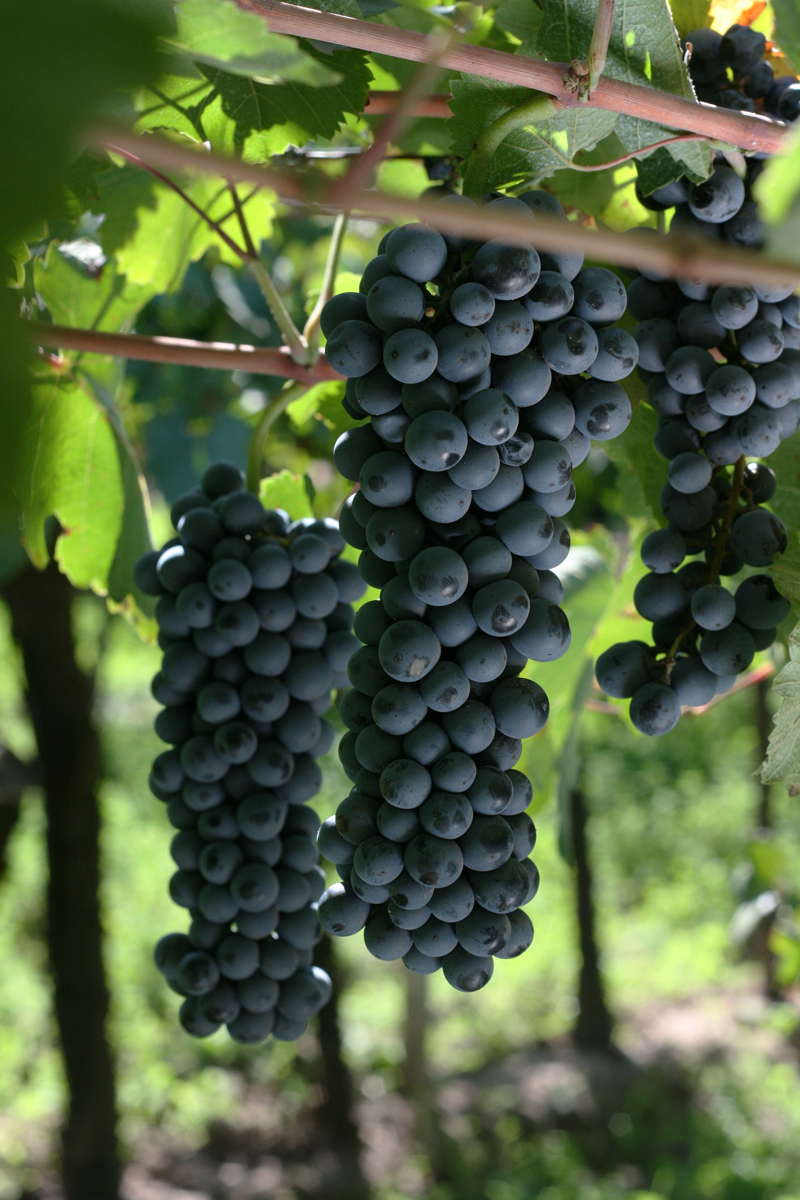
Cluster of Bonarda/Charbone/Douce noir grapes, 2011.

Bonarda Piemontese, now officially listed simply as Bonarda but also known as Bonarda di Chieri and Bonarda del Monferrato is a red Italian wine grape variety that is grown in the northwestern region of Piedmont. Prior to the phylloxera epidemic of the 19th century, Bonarda was speculated to have accounted for 30% of the plantings in Piedmont but today is only found in scattered plantings along the left bank of the Tanaro river near Govone. In the mid-1990s, the grape experienced a slight revival as Piedmontese producers sought to add more aromatics to their Barbera wines by blending in Bonarda.

Despite the similarities of their synonyms, the grape is not related to Douce noir grape which is known as Bonarda in Argentina nor the Croatina grape, which make tannic wines similar to Piedmont's Dolcetto.
