= Nielluccio =

Variety of grape

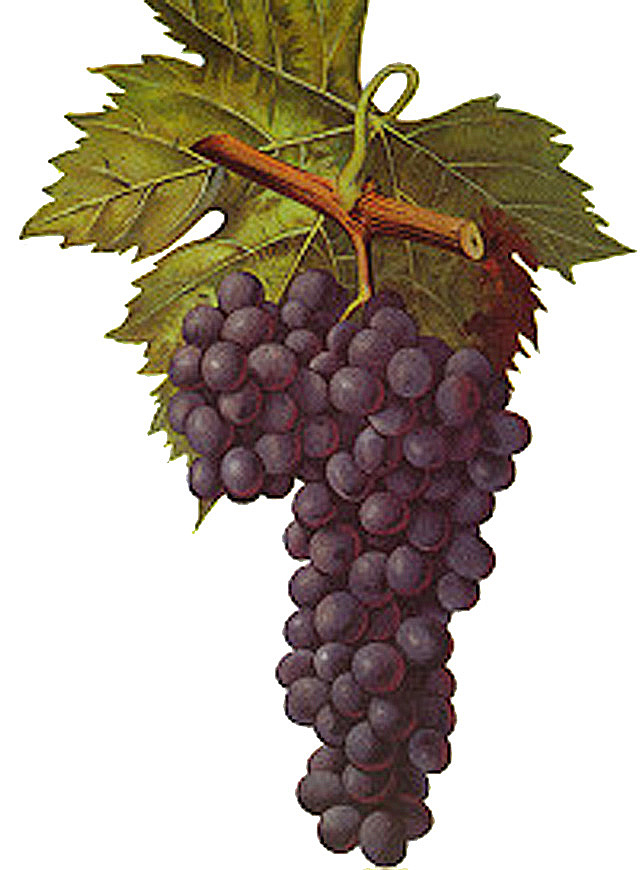
Nielluccio in Viala & Vermorel.

Nielluccio is a red wine grape variety that is widely planted on Corsica. It is the principal grape variety used in the production of the Appellation d'Origine Contrôlée AOC red wine Patrimonio, where it must by law make up 95% of the blend. An early budding vine, Nielluccio produces wines lacking in color and with high alcohol levels. It is commonly used to make rosé wine.

There is confusion about the grape's exact origins with some wine experts describing the grape as being indigenous to Corsica while other theories report that the grape is of Italian origins and possibly even a genetically identical clone of the Tuscan wine grape Sangiovese that came to Corsica from Genoa.

== History ==
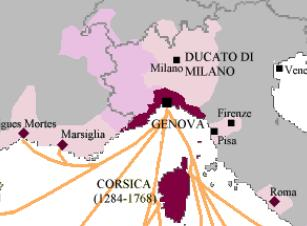
Nielluccio may have been introduced to Corsica by the Genoese while the island was under the rule of the Republic of Genoa.

The exact origins of Nielluccio are disputed. While the grape is today known as primarily a French, or more specifically, Corsican grape, ampelographers in the late 20th century began to believe that the grape was likely of Italian origins. Nielluccio's close genetic similarities to the indigenous Italian variety Sangiovese suggest that the two grapes are closely related. The grape was likely introduced to Corsica by the Genoese during their long rule over the island from the 13th century to the 18th century. But this view is not universally accepted with some wine experts, such as Oz Clarke, believing that the grape is indigenous to Corsica. Even Jancis Robinson believed once that Nielluccio was native to Corsica but her more recent works give support to the Genoese theory.

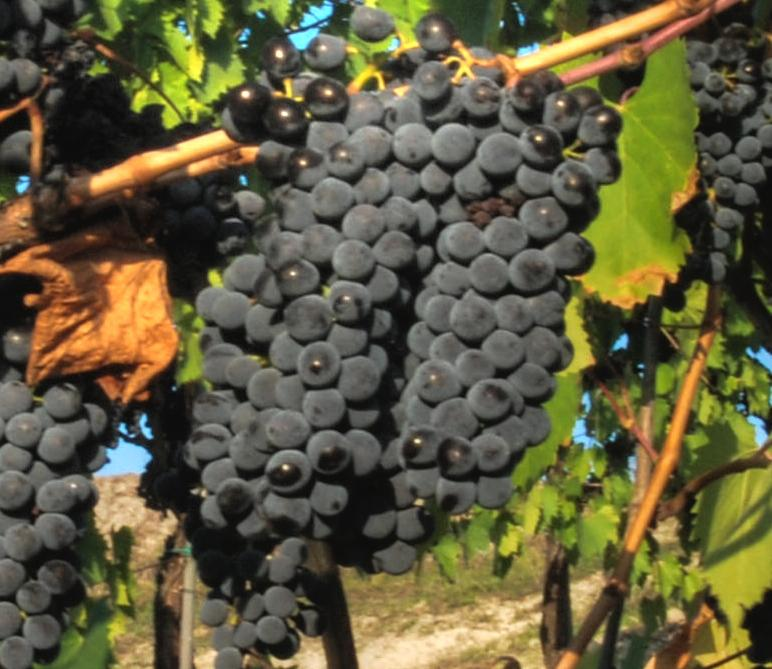
The VIVC database list Nielluccio as a synonym of Sangiovese (pictured) instead of a separate grape variety.

To further add to the mystery, there is some belief that the extremely close genetic similarities between Sangiovese and Nielluccio could mean that they are exactly the same grape (or rather a clone given Sangiovese's propensity for mutation). Indeed, the German Vitis International Variety Catalogue data base of known grape cultivars does not even give Nielluccio a separate entry, rather grouping it in as a synonym of Sangiovese. Still many French and English wine texts, such as the Oxford Companion to Wine, list the grape as a separate entry but with a note describing its close similarities to Sangiovese.

While there is very little Nielluccio grown today in Italy, it is the third most widely planted variety in Corsica. Plantings declined for most of the 20th century as French immigrants from North Africa imported cuttings of varieties common in Algerian wine such as Carignan and Cinsaut. At the turn of the 21st century, as Corsican winemakers rediscovered "indigenous" Corsican varieties, interest in Nielluccio was on the upswing.

== Wine regions ==
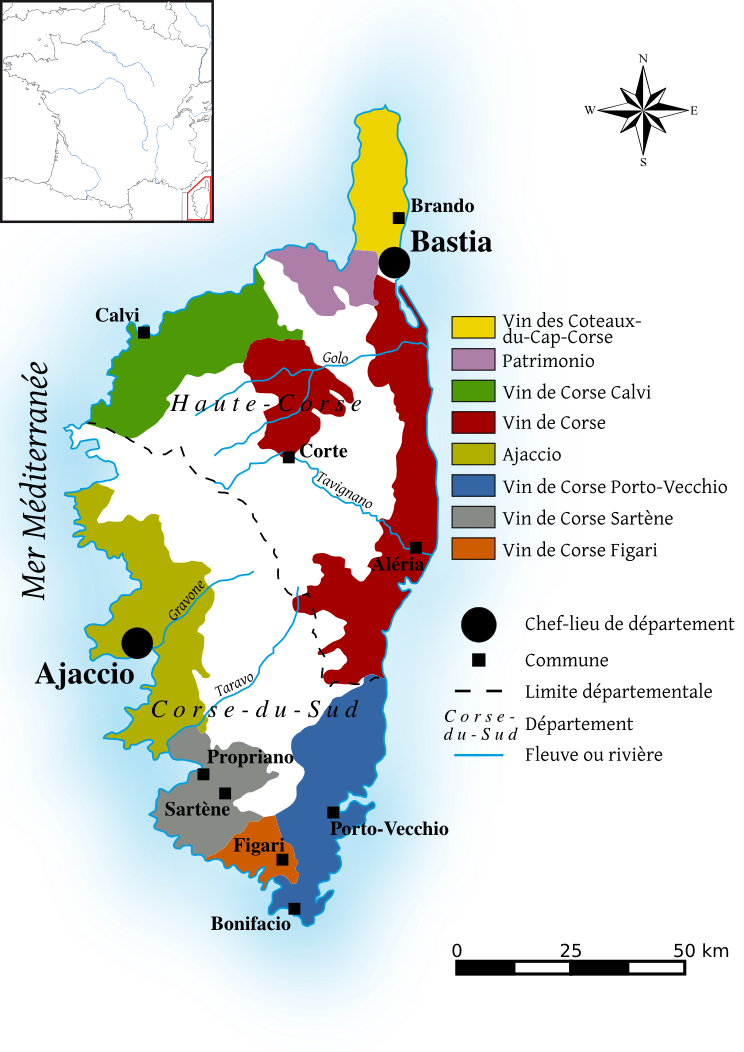
While Nielluccio is found throughout the island, the AOC regions of Patrimonio in the north (in purple) and Porto-Vecchio in the south (in blue) have the most plantings of the variety.

Today Nielluccio is found almost exclusively on Corsica where it is the principal grape variety behind the AOC wines grown around Patrimonio in the north of the island. The grape's stronghold in the south is Porto-Vecchio, where it is usually blended. According to the AOC regulations for Patrimonio the grapes must be harvested to a yield no greater than 50 hectoliters/hectare and produce red wines with a minimum alcohol level of 12% and rosé a minimum of 11.5%. For Vin de Corse which includes the wines of Porto-Vecchio, the harvest yield requirements are the same but the red wines only need to reach an alcohol level of at least 11.5%.

Throughout Corsica, the variety is often blended with Sciacarello. Other varieties that Nielluccio is blended with for red blends and rosé wines include Barbarossa, Grenache, Vermentino, Cinsault and Carignan. While its plantings declined during the 20th century, updates to the encépagement for Corsica's AOCs have been allocating increasingly higher proportions of red and rosé blends to the use of Nielluccio. Along with Sciacarello and Grenache, Nielluccio must compose at least 50% of the blend for red wines labeled under the general Vin de Corse AOC.

== Viticulture ==
As of 2000, there were 4000 acres (1,600 hectares) of Nielluccio planted on Corsica. The grape seems to thrive on vineyard soils that are primarily clay and limestone, particularly those of Patrimonio. The variety buds early and ripens late which puts it at risk for both spring time frosts and grape rots with rains during harvest.

== Wine ==
Wine expert Oz Clarke describes Nielluccio as producing "robust and tannic" wines with moderate to high levels of acidity. Jancis Robinson describes the wines very alcoholic with low color pigmentation and "lacking guts" or structure.

While the tannins and acidity in the grapes can help to produce fuller bodied wines with some aging potential, they can also make the wine come across as harsh depending on not only the physiological ripeness of the grapes at harvest but also how the winemaking process is carried out from maceration, fermentation, clarification and if the wine goes through any oak and filtering. Another method that is often used to balance Nielluccio's tannins and acidity is blending with Sciacarello a frequent partner.

According to Jancis Robinson, it is the Nielluccio rosé from Patrimonio that tend to get the most critical acclaim from non-Corsicans of all the Nielluccio-based wines.

== Synonyms ==
Over the centuries, Nielluccio and its wines have been known under a variety of synonyms including Niellucio, Niella, Nielluccia and Negretta.
