= San Giuseppe =

San Giuseppe is the Italian name of Saint Joseph. It may refer to:

== Places in Italy ==
=== Municipalities (comuni) ===
- Rima San Giuseppe, in the province of Vercelli, Piedmont
- San Giuseppe Jato, in the province of Palermo, Sicily
- San Giuseppe Vesuviano, in the province of Naples, Campania
- San Marzano di San Giuseppe, in the province of Taranto, Apulia

=== Hamlets (frazioni) ===
- San Giuseppe (Cassola), in the municipality of Cassola, Veneto
- San Giuseppe (Comacchio), in the municipality of Comacchio, Emilia-Romagna
- San Giuseppe (Montecarlo), in the municipality of Montecarlo, Tuscany
- San Giuseppe (Tolentino), in the municipality of Tolentino, Marche
- San Giuseppe di Casto, in the municipality of Andorno Micca, Piedmont
- San Giuseppe, Cuneo, in the municipality of Cuneo, Piedmont

=== Districts ===
- San Giuseppe (Monza), in the city of Monza, Lombardy
- San Giuseppe (Naples), in the city of Naples, Campania

== Churches ==
=== Italy ===
- San Giuseppe, Aci Catena, Sicily
- San Giuseppe, Brescia, Lombardy
- San Giuseppe, Cagli, Marche
- San Giuseppe, Cameri, Piedmont
- San Giuseppe, Canicattì, Sicily
- San Giuseppe, Castelnuovo di Garfagnana, Tuscany
- San Giuseppe, Enna, Sicily
- San Giuseppe, Florence, Tuscany
- San Giuseppe, Grosseto, Tuscany
- San Giuseppe, Lendinara, Veneto
- San Giuseppe, Milan, Lombardy
- San Giuseppe, Parma, Emilia-Romagna
- San Giuseppe, Pollenza, Marche
- San Giuseppe, Ragusa, Sicily
- San Giuseppe, Sanseverino Marche, Marche
- San Giuseppe, Santa Maria Nuova, Marche
- San Giuseppe, Sassuolo, Emilia-Romagna
- San Giuseppe, Sermoneta, Lazio
- San Giuseppe, Siena, Tuscany
- San Giuseppe, Siracusa, Sicily
- San Giuseppe, Vigevano, Lombardy

=== United States ===
- San Giuseppe's Church (New York City), a Roman Catholic church in New York City

== Other ==
- San Giuseppe nero, Italian wine grape grown in the Lazio region of central Italy
- U cumbitu 'i San Giuseppi, also known as u mmitu 'e San Giuseppe, a custom for Saint Joseph's Day in the Calabria region of southern Italy

== See also ==
- Saint Joseph (disambiguation)
- San José (disambiguation)
- São José (disambiguation)
