= San Rocco, Cameri =

Church building in Cameri, Italy

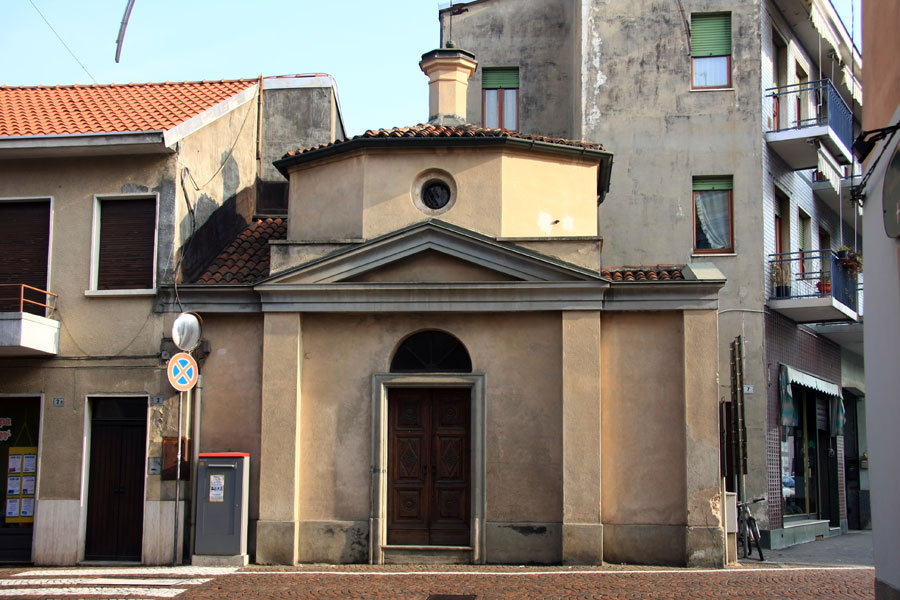
San Rocco in Cameri

San Rocco is a Roman Catholic oratory or small church located on Piazza Dante Alighieri, along with the parish church of San Michele and the church of the Santissimo Sacramento, in the center of Cameri, province of Novara, Piedmont, Italy.

== History ==
The church was building in the 16th century in a Greek Cross layout with a central octagonal dome with a small lantern. It is claimed that this was the first parish church in Cameri. It likely filled this function after 1583, while the present San Michele was being erected. At some point, perhaps after one of the frequent plague epidemics, the church was dedicated to St Roch.

The interior has a number of frescoes, including one by the 16th century painter Giovanni Angelo De Canta. A fresco of the Madonna and Child was moved here from another building in the 20th century.
