= San Francesco, Canicattì =

Roman Catholic church in Sicily, Italy

Coordinates: 37.359576°N 13.852368°E

San Francesco is a Baroque-style, Roman Catholic church located on near the railway station in the town of Canicattì, province of Agrigento, region of Sicily, Italy.

== History ==
The church is attached to the ancient Convent of the Franciscans, suppressed after the annexation of Sicily to the Kingdom of Italy. The church was begun in 1554 at the site of an early Oratory, under the patronage of Baron Giovanni Battista Bonanno. In 1954 it was consecrated by Cardinal Ernesto Ruffini as a Shrine dedicated to the Immaculate Conception, patroness of the town.

In 1906, the Convent was converted under the patronage of Baron Francesco Lombardo, into a nursing home for the elderly, with the designs drawn up by Ernesto Basile. The church was converted to parish church in 1963.

The church facade has sandstone mouldings with stucco walls. The interior structure was built above a crypt, used as an ossuary by the Franciscans. The interior has a single nave once possessing 18th-century ceiling frescoes by Domenico Provenzano, but lost in the roof collapse of 1823. The side altars possess a number of statues. In the first niche on the right is an eighteenth-century statue of St Anthony of Padua. In the second niche, a sculptural wooden group with the Pietà. In the third altar, a wooden statue of St Francis is attributed to the workshop of the sculptors Bagnasco.

In the apse, is a large wooden altar topped by a venerated statue of the Immaculate Conception. This statue is carried during holidays in procession to the major churches of the city. Legend holds that the image of the Virgin was sculpted not by human, but miraculously by the hands of angels.
