= Sacro Cuore di Gesù, Vigevano =

Coordinates: 45.3212°N 8.8562°E

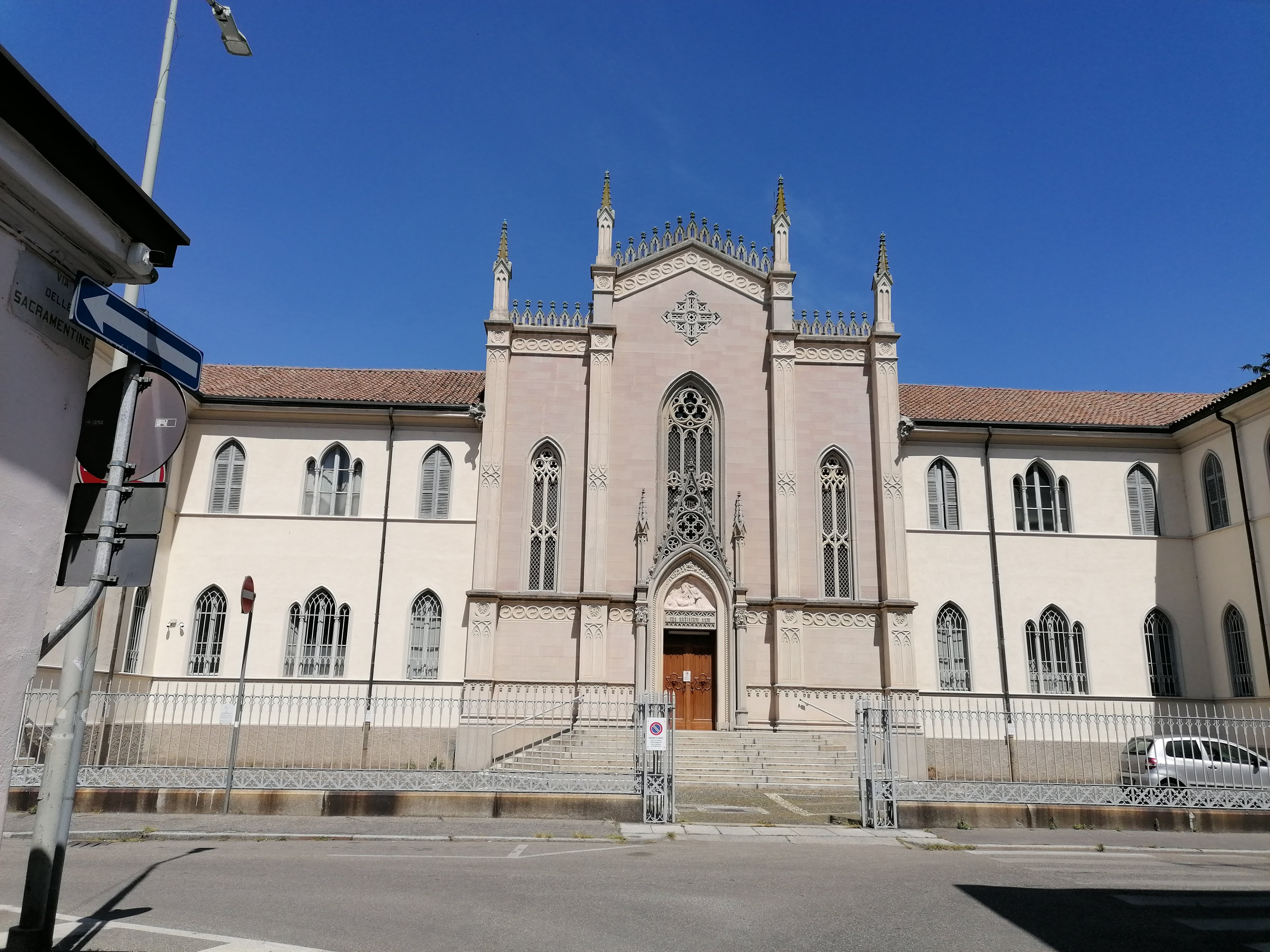
The convent.

The convent of Sacramentine or church of the Sacred Heart of Jesus is a religious building located in Vigevano, in the province of Pavia and diocese of Vigevano, Italy.

== Description and history ==
The Perpetual Adorers of the Blessed Sacrament (also called Sacramentine nuns) were founded on 16 April 1770 by mother Maria Maddalena dell'Incarnazione, born Caterina Sordini, of Porto Santo Stefano. Having entered a Franciscan convent at the age of eighteen, during one night (known as night of the Light and remembered by Sacramentine on 19 February) she had a vision of Jesus in the form of the Holy Eucharist: she therefore worked to found an order with main purpose the adoration of the Blessed Sacrament. The order was recognized by Pope Pius VII on 13 February 1818. The first monastery was placed in Rome, in the former Monastery of Sant'Anna alle Quattro Fontane.

The Sacramentine Sisters arrived in Vigevano from Turin on 6 June 1876 at the request of the then bishop Monsignor Pietro De Gaudenzi, who wanted to establish a place in the city where it was possible to carry out continuous adoration of the Blessed Sacrament Eucharist. The first headquarters was in the current Monastery of the Dominicans, in Vicolo Deomini, built specifically for them by Bishop De Gaudenzi between 1873 and 1876. However, soon the monastery it became too small, given the high number of novices. In 1908, Donna Francesca Manara Negrone donated land in Via Trento to the nuns, where the new monastery was built. On 20 June 1910, with the blessing of the bishop Monsignor Pietro Berruti, the first stone was laid, and on 6 June 1912 the nuns moved definitively to the new headquarters.

The new monastery was designed by a nun architect, Maria del Sacro Cuore Vittadini, with the supervision of a priest architect, Monsignor Spirito Maria Chiappetta. It has neo-Gothic shapes, inspired by French Gothic, with three naves and side chapels; the nuns' choir is located in the polygonal choir, a cloistered area. The façade is tripartite, high and slender and was completed in 1914. The church has a bell tower, in which there are three hammer-like bells. The interior is totally built with Candoglia marble, with stucco vaults painted with neo-Gothic motifs. Among the paintings present in the side altars, there are that of the Addolorata by Enrico Reffo and that of the Sacred Heart by Giovan Battista Garberini. Behind the main altar there is a wrought iron grate by Maurizio Beolchi, which separates the church from the monastic choir. The choir was created by Antonio Baldi. To the left of the main altar there is a chapel with a grate, from which the nuns attend Mass and receive the Eucharist; on the right, above the sacristy, there is a women's gallery in which, in turn, the nuns worship the Blessed Sacrament.

Above the choir is the large neo-Gothic pipe organ case, also visible from the accessible part of the church. The organ comes from the first monastery in Vicolo Deomini, was built by Carlo I Vegezzi Bossi in 1876 and was partially rebuilt at the end of the nineteenth century by Alessandro Mentasti. Subsequently, the nuns asked Mentasti first and then Alessandro Krengli to build a new one with two keyboards, starting from the old one. The large organ was restored in 2019 by Sergio Castegnaro according to the directives of the Superintendency.
