= Chiesa del Purgatorio =

Chiesa del Purgatorio may refer to the following churches in Italy:

- Chiesa del Purgatorio, Canicattì, Sicily
- Chiesa del Purgatorio, Castellammare di Stabia, Naples
- Chiesa del Purgatorio, Ragusa, Sicily
- Chiesa del Purgatorio, Venafro, Molise
