= Villino Florio =

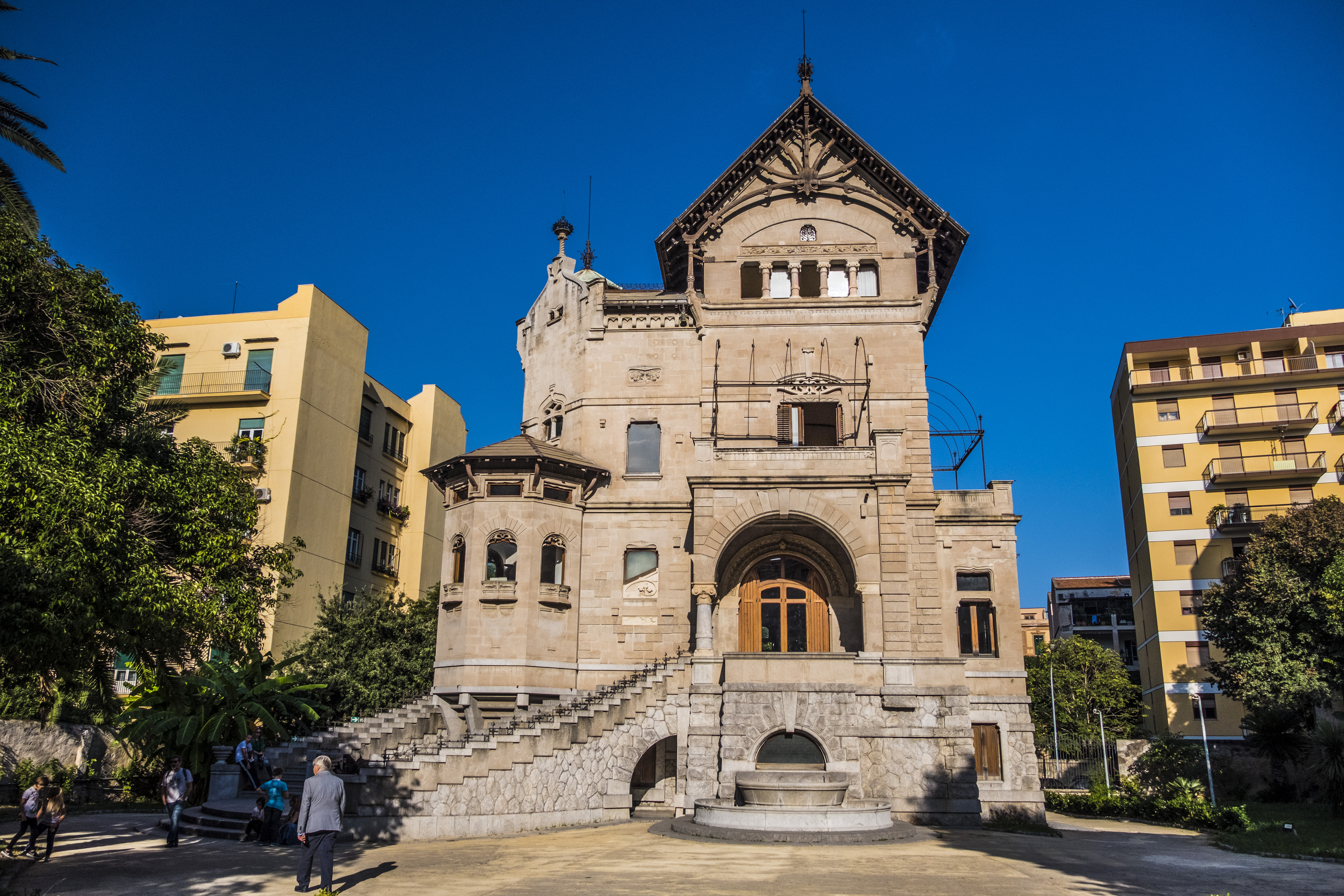
Facade

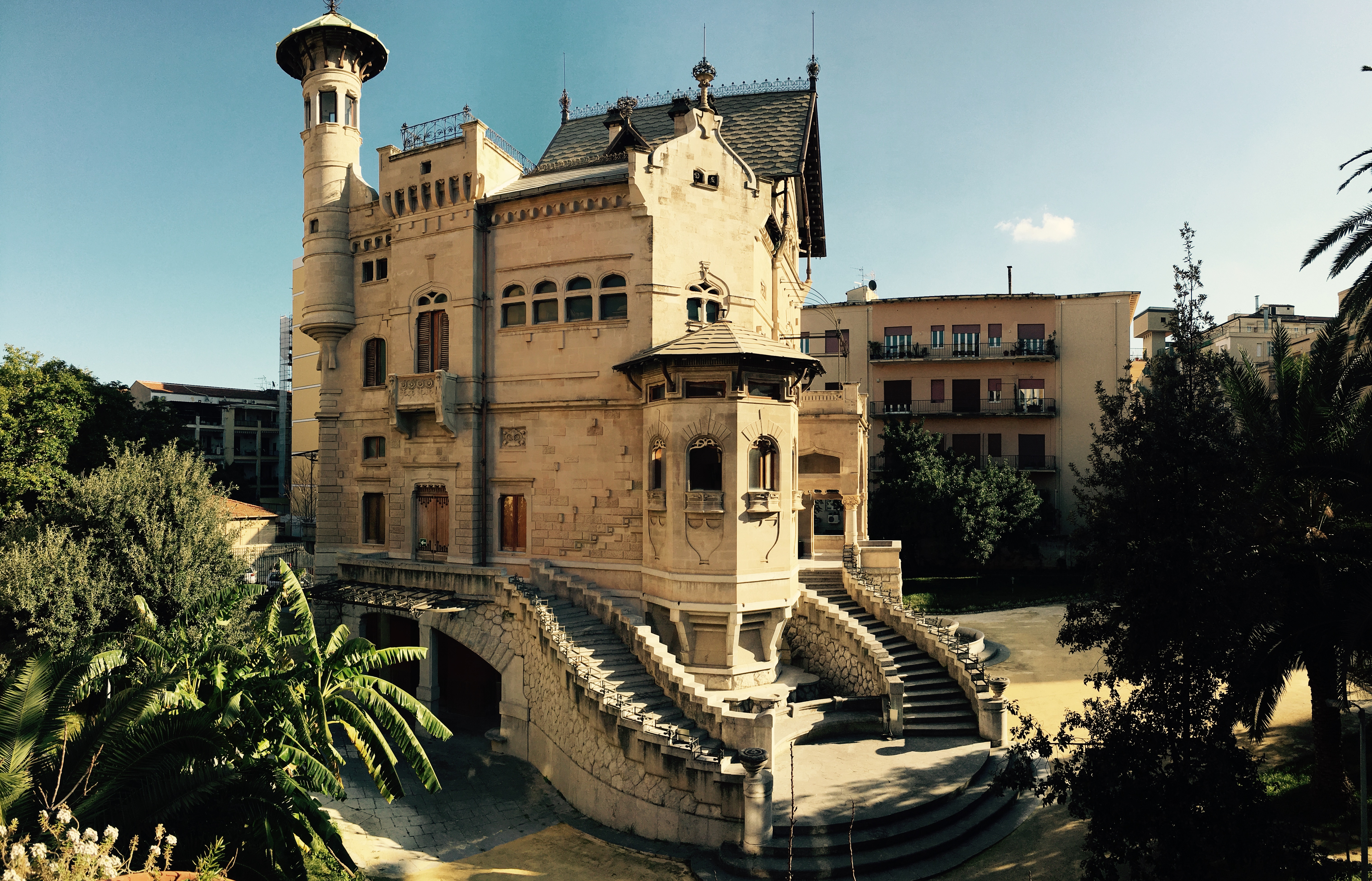
View from side

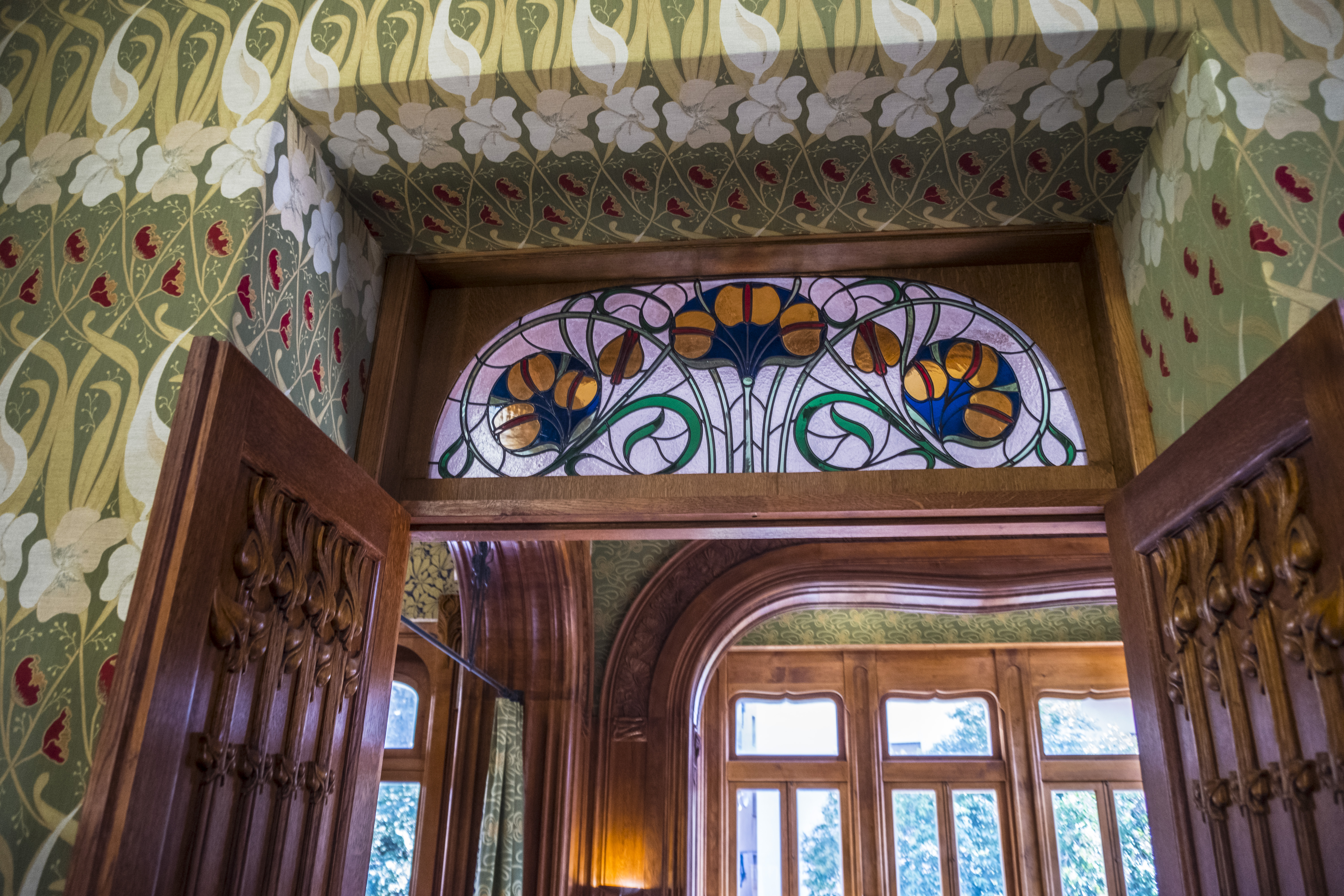
Art nouveau interior decoration including stained glass

Villino Florio is a private residence designed in an eclectic Art Nouveau (Liberty) style by Ernesto Basile, and located on Viale Regina Margherita #38 in the city of Palermo, Siciy, Italy.

== History ==
The structure was commissioned by the scion of the wealthy Florio family, Ignazio Florio Jr, also owners of the hotel refurbished by Basile, Villa Igiea. Construction was pursued between 1899 and 1902. The exterior incorporates architectural element from various traditions, including neogothic turrets. The house has a novel interpretation of dual entry staircases common in Sicilian architecture. The house fell into disuse after a fire in 1962 damaged some of the interiors. A recent restoration has allowed visitors to see the interiors.
