= Santa Maria Assunta, Cameri =

Church building in Cameri, Italy

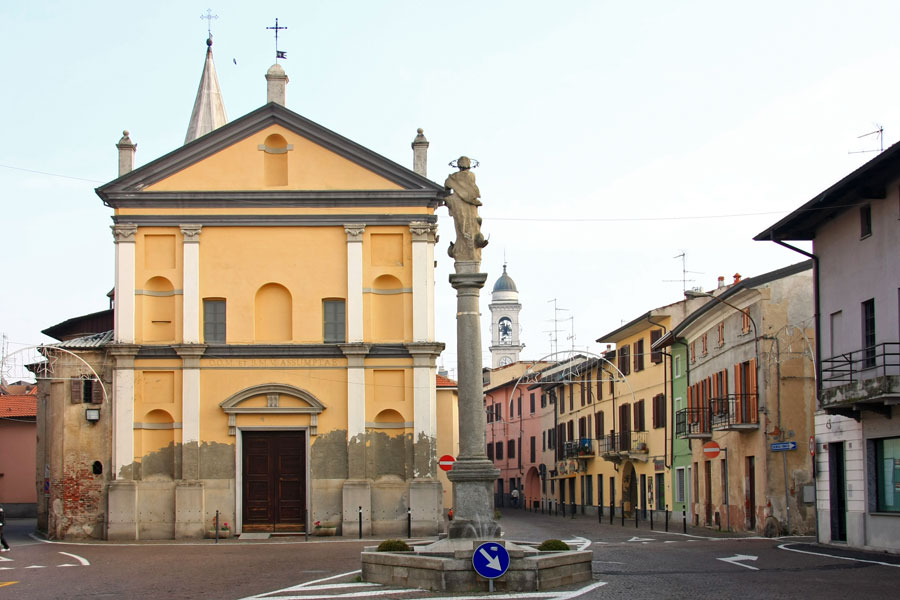
Santa Maria Assunta in Cameri

Santa Maria Assunta is a Roman Catholic church located on Piazza Santa Maria in the town of Cameri, province of Novara, Piedmont, Italy.

== History ==
A church at the site was present since 1173, known as San Michele in Cameri. Later the church was also known as the Chiesa dei Bianchi (Church of the Whites), as opposed to the Chiesa del Santissimo Sacramento (Chiesa dei Rossi). Both churches belonged to flagellant confraternities, identifiable by their respectively colored robes. This church was erected by the Confraternity of St Michael Archangel, established officially in 1565.

The church façade has eight pilasters over two stories, with empty niches. The interior is simple until the presbytery with a baroque main altar made of colored marble. The large wooden altarpiece has a painting depicting St Michael. On the counterfacade is an organ with a wooden balustrade.
