= San Giuseppe, Canicattì =

Church in Canicatti, Italy

San Giuseppe is a Baroque-style, Roman Catholic church located on Corso Umberto I in the town of Canicattì, province of Agrigento, region of Sicily, Italy.

== History ==
The site was originally the home of a monastery and hospital run by the Collegio di Maria (order of Suore collegine della Sacra Famiglia) established by Pietro Marcellino Corradini. The hospital was patronized in 1620 by the Baron Giacomo I Bonanno Colonna. The church was also called the "Hospital Church".

The church, erected in the 18th century, has undergone many modifications of the centuries, including a major reconstruction in the 20th century by Ernesto Basile, who designed the façade. He also designed the interior coffered ceiling.
