= San Diego, Canicattì =

Church in Canicattì, Italy

Coordinates: 37.3583°N 13.8498°E

San Diego, formerly San Sebastiano, is a Neoclassic-style, Roman Catholic church located on Largo Savoia and Viale Regina Margherita in the town of Canicattì, province of Agrigento, region of Sicily, Italy.

== History ==
A church at the site was first erected between 1576 and 1583, as an ex voto following the ebbing of a plague. It was patronized by the Confraternity of San Sebastiano and consecrated by the Bishop of Agrigento. During this period, it served as the main church, or Chiesa Matrice of the town, a role now encompassed by San Pancrazio. By the 18th century, this church had followed into near ruin, and construction of the present layout began in 1770 and was completed in 1782. It is dedicated to St Diego de Alcalá (San Diego de Alcalá). It became a parish church in 1933.

The sandstone façade, dating to 1865, has a statue of San Diego within a niche. The belltower was erected in 1880 and is capped by a maiolica tiled dome. The interior has three naves, and was decorated (1791) with stucco. The chapel of the Holy Spirit, once the main chapel, was refurbished after a fire in 1932.

The interior contains frescoes by the studio of Guadagnino brothers in the ceilings near the entrance, depicting the Noah giving thanks after the Flood, the Sacrifice of Isaac, and San Diego and the Virgin intercede with Jesus for the city of Canicattì. The second chapel on the right has a canvas depicting The Virgin tends for the Souls in Purgatory attributed to Pietro Guadagnino, while in the left nave are two canvases depicting Pentecost and St Alfonso Maria De Liguori attributed to Francesco Guadagnino. There are two modern frescoes, depicting St Sebastian healed by the virgins in the nave ceiling, and one on the presbytery depicting the Glory of San Diego by Assenza Valente in 1932, to replace those lost in the 1932 fire.
