= Madonna di San Cassiano, Cameri =

Church building in Cameri, Italy

Coordinates: 45.50630°N 8.66853°E

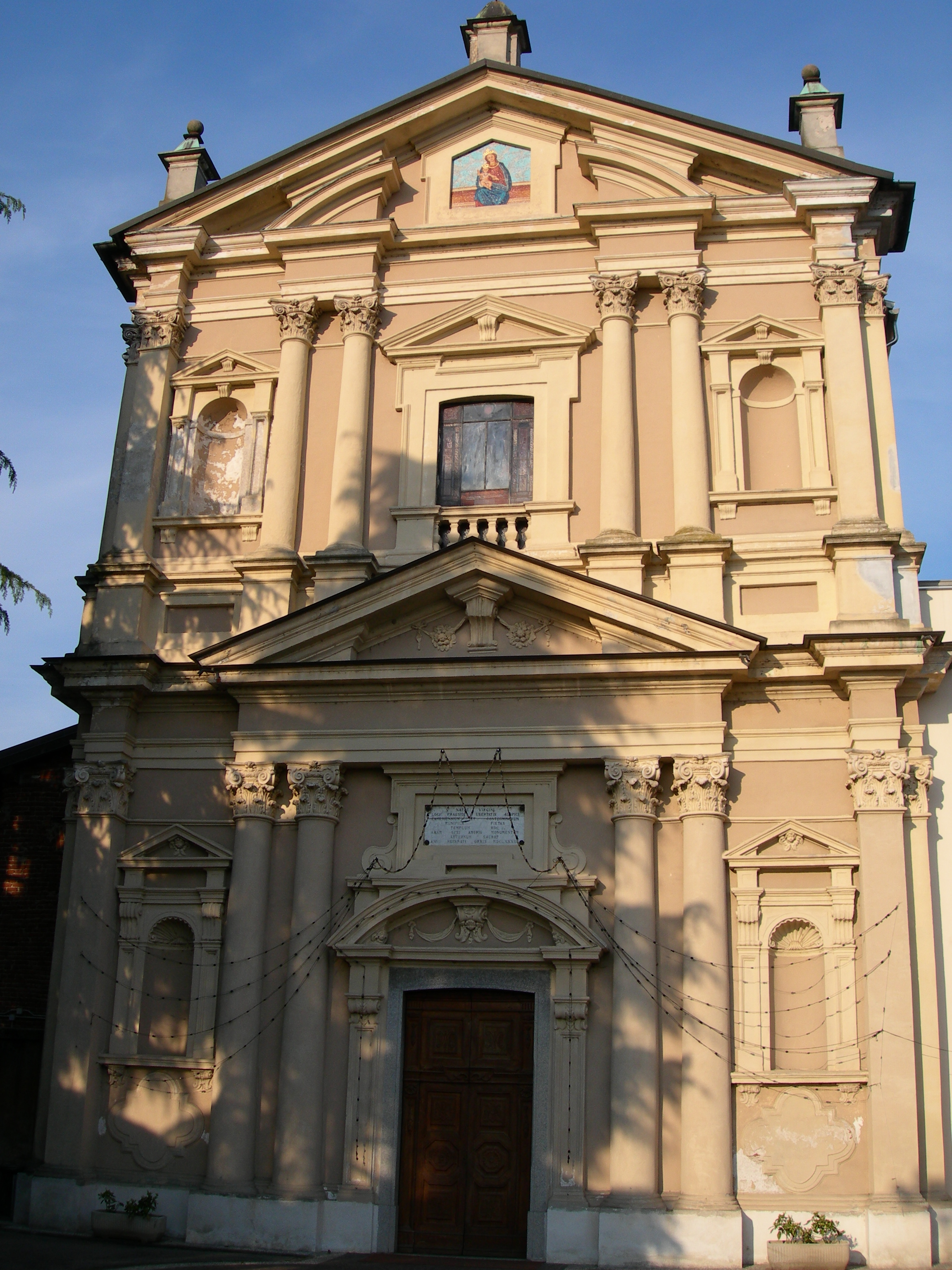

The Madonna di San Cassiano, also known as La Madòna di Fraj, is a Roman Catholic church located on Via Galileo Galilei in the town limits of Cameri, province of Novara, Piedmont, Italy.

== History ==
A church at the site is documented since 1012. It was rebuilt in the present Baroque layout in 1673. A single nave opens to lateral chapels.

The interior contains single fresco dating prior to the 12th century: a Virgin in Pink with the Christ Child, located behind the main altar. The main altar was built in 1671 with black marble. The main altarpiece is an 18th-century painting depicting San Cassiano has a vision of the Madonna and Child. The nave ceiling is frescoed with an Annuciation and an Assumption of the Virgin. One of the chapels houses a depiction of Calvary with Christ reached by a Scala Sancta ascended on your knees.

Adjacent to the church is a convent, now housing priests of the Passionists Order. In front of the church is a column surmounted with a Madonna and Child installed in 1757.
