= Canicattì massacre =

1943 wartime incident in Sicily, Italy

- Part of Allied invasion of Sicily
- Location: Canicattì, Sicily, Kingdom of Italy
- Date: July 1943
- Deaths: 6–8
- Perpetrators: George Herbert McCaffrey and U.S. soldiers

The Canicattì massacre was the killing by American soldiers of six to eight Italian civilians who were looting a soap factory in Canicattì, Italy on July 14, 1943. The killings followed the town's capture by American forces during the Allied invasion of Sicily.

== Background and massacre ==
Allied forces began the invasion of Sicily on July 10, 1943. In the following days, strikes and food riots broke out in some regions, and U.S. general Lucian Truscott ordered that looters should be shot. On July 14, U.S. troops received a report that civilians were looting a bombed soap factory in Canicatti. Lieutenant Colonel George Herbert McCaffrey arrived at the scene with some soldiers and ordered the crowd to leave. When the crowd ignored his demand, McCaffrey ordered his men to fire into the crowd. When some of his men refused, he drew his sidearm and opened fire. Six to eight Italian civilians were killed, including a child.

== See also ==
- List of massacres in Italy
- Allied war crimes during World War II
