= Villino Ida Basile =

Art Nouveau home in Palermo, Sicily, Italy

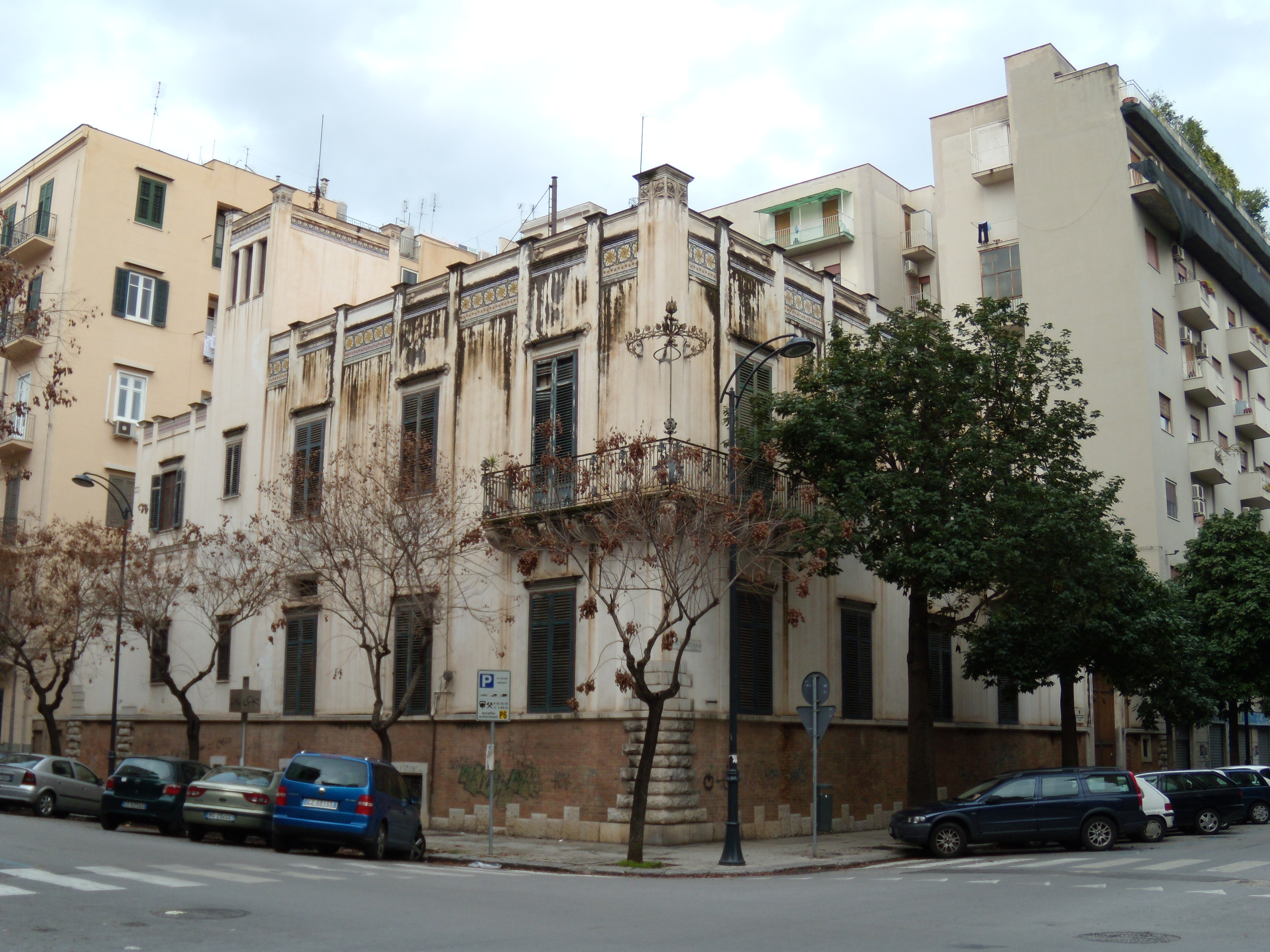
View of exterior

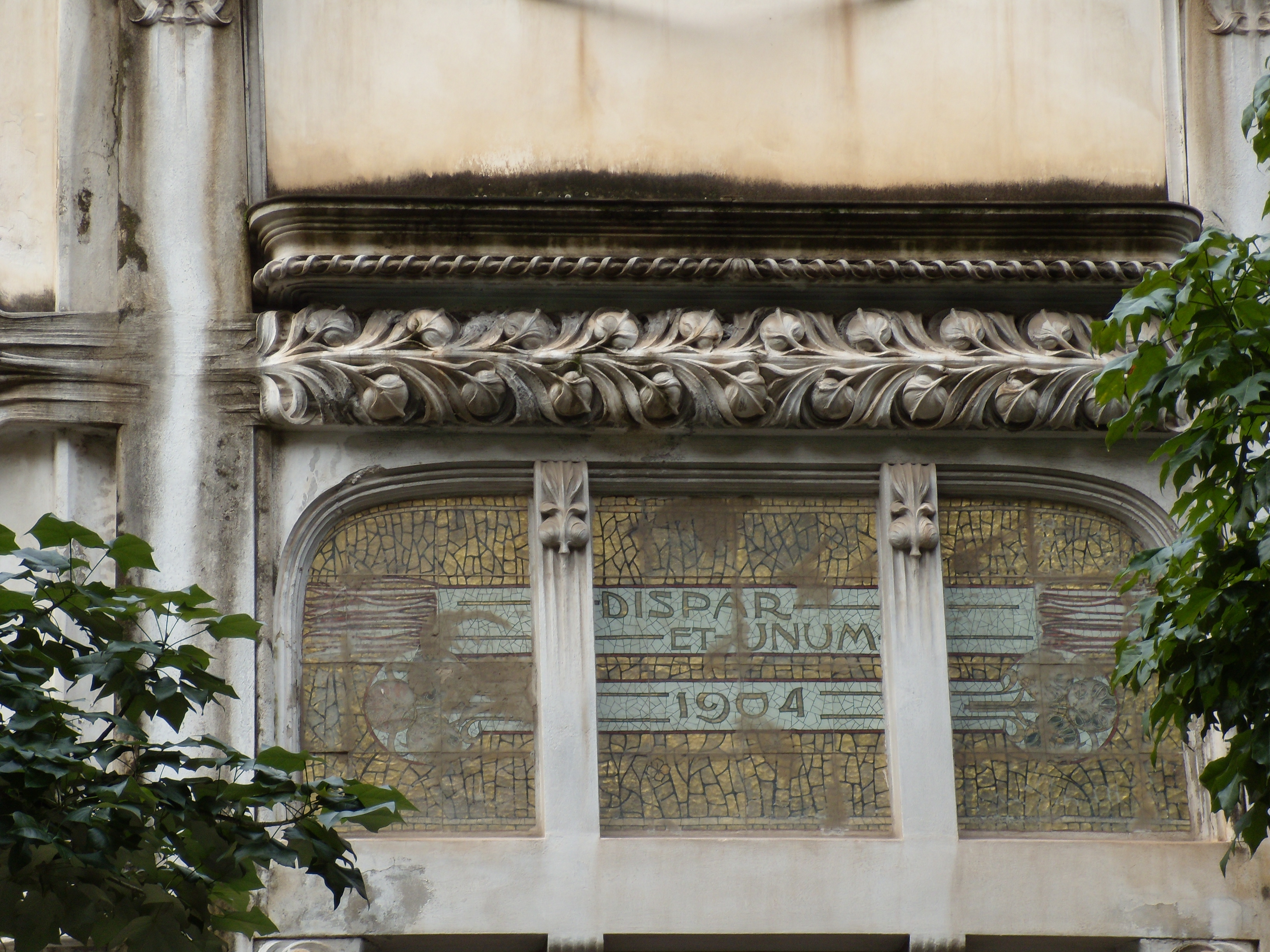
Portal

Villino Ida Basile is a former private residence designed in an Art Nouveau (Liberty) style by Ernesto Basile, and located on Via Siracusa #15 in the city of Palermo, Sicily, Italy.

== History ==
The structure was built in 1904 as his private home by Basile, and named after his wife Ida. Built in three stories, the structure reinterprets the motif of a balcony, common to Sicilian palaces, but here placed in a corner with a floral design to the iron grill. A majolica frieze is utilized on the third floor. Over the elaborate portal is the motto Dispar et Unum (Diverse and Unique). The interior has a small patio-garden. The home now houses the library of the Soprintendenza per i Beni Culturali e Ambientali di Palermo and the Library of the Soprintendenza ai beni librari per la Sicilia Occidentale.
