= San Vito a Cavagliano =

Church building in Bellinzago Novarese, Italy

Coordinates: 45.53281°N 8.63869°E

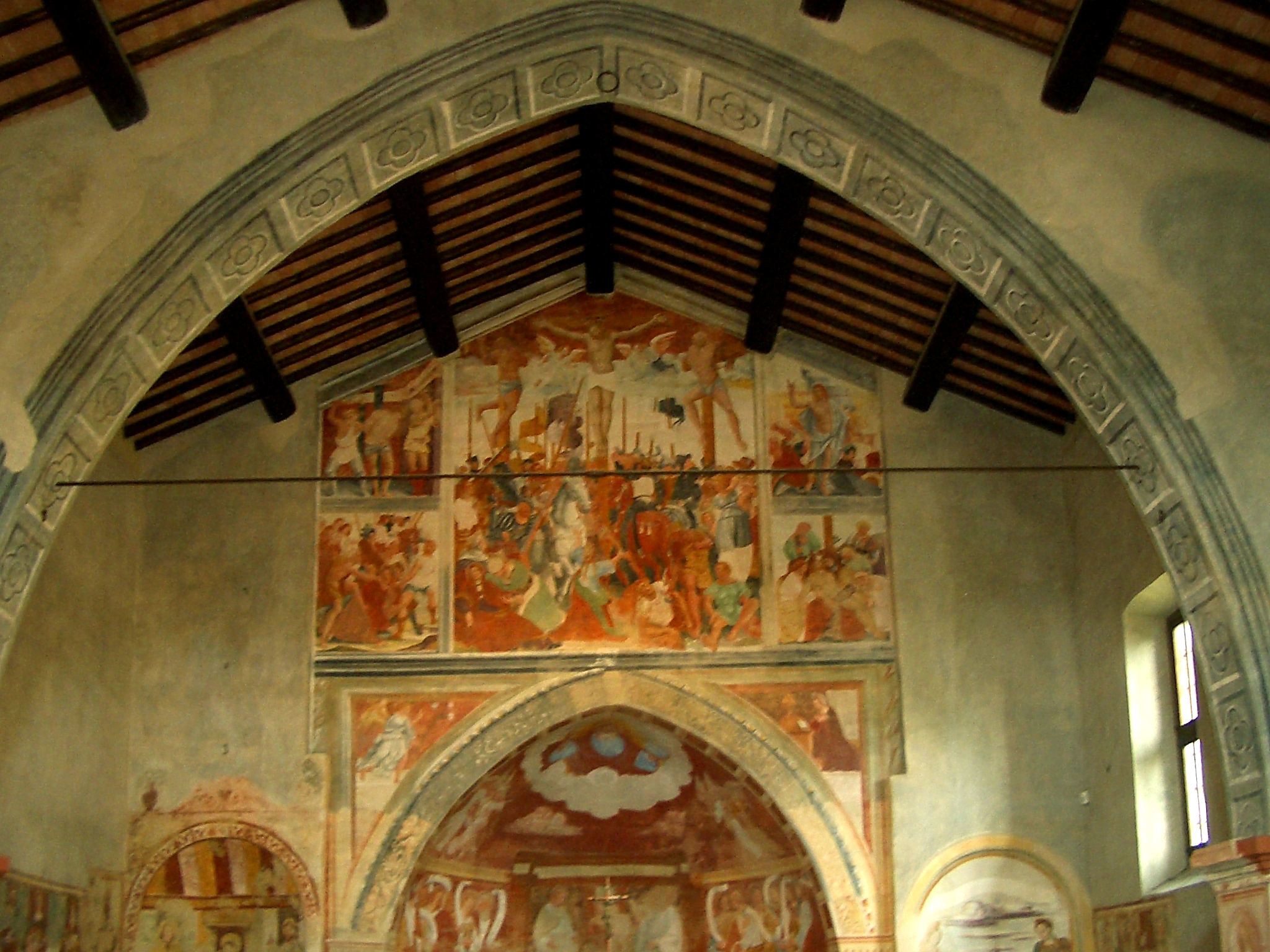
- Interior of the church.

Religion
- Affiliation: Roman Catholic

Location
- Location: Bellinzago Novarese, Italy
- Interactive map of San Vito a Cavagliano

Architecture
- Type: Church
- Style: Romanesque

San Vito a Cavagliano is a church in Bellinzago Novarese, Italy. The church was built in the Romanesque style. The interior is richly decorated with frescos executed in the 15th or 16th centuries by a follower of Gaudenzio Ferrari.
