= Salvatore Corsitto =

Italian actor (1913–1999)

Salvatore Corsitto (9 January 1913 – 6 April 1999) was an Italian actor.

== Biography ==
Corsitto was born 9 January 1913 in Canicattì. He was notable for his role as Amerigo Bonasera in The Godfather (1972). He also acted in television movies, including What Are Best Friends For? (1973).

He died 6 April 1999, aged 86.
