= Canicattì =

Municipality in Sicily, Italy

Canicattì Caniattì
- Comune
- Città di Canicattì
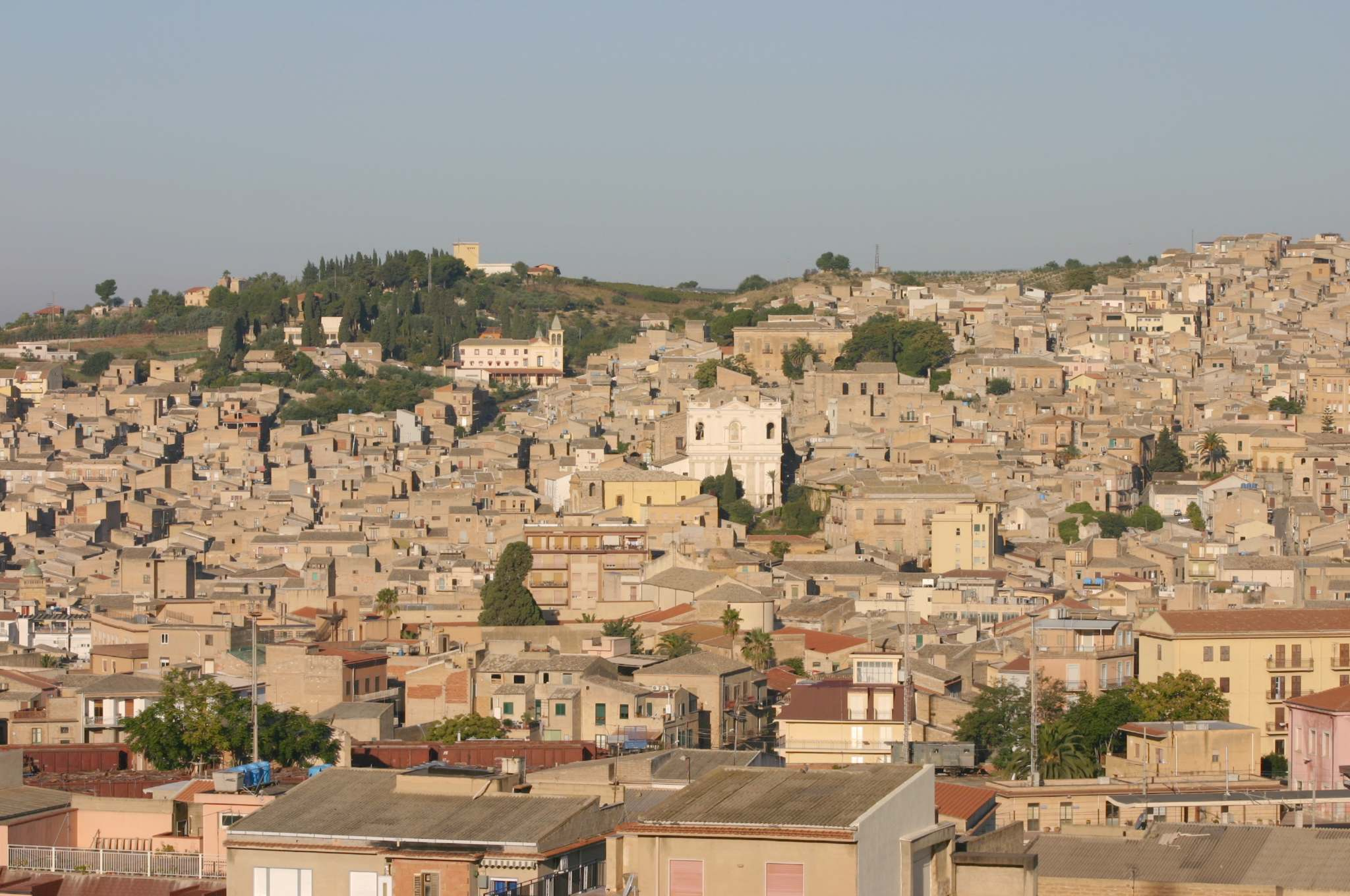
- View of Canicattì

- Coat of arms

- Canicattì within the Province of Agrigento

- Location of Canicattì in Italy Canicattì (Sicily)
- Coordinates: 37°22′N 13°51′E
- Country: Italy
- Region: Sicily
- Province: Agrigento (AG)

Government
  - Mayor: Vincenzo Corbo

Area
  - Total: 91.4 km^{2} (35.3 sq mi)
- Elevation: 465 m (1,526 ft)

Population (30 April 2026)
  - Total: 34,199
  - Density: 374/km^{2} (969/sq mi)
- Demonym(s): Canicattinesi, Caniattinisi
- Time zone: UTC+1 (CET)
  - Summer (DST): UTC+2 (CEST)
- Postal code: 92024
- Dialing code: 0922
- ISTAT code: 084011
- Patron saint: Saint Pancras of Rome
- Saint day: 12 May
- Website: Official website

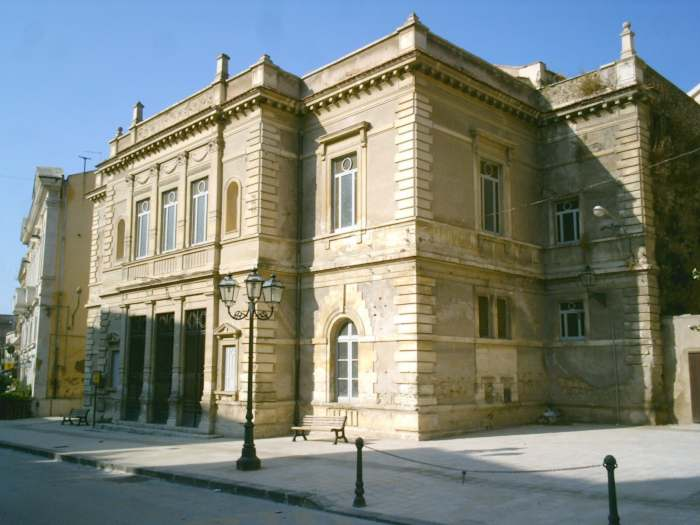
The theatre built by Ernesto Basile

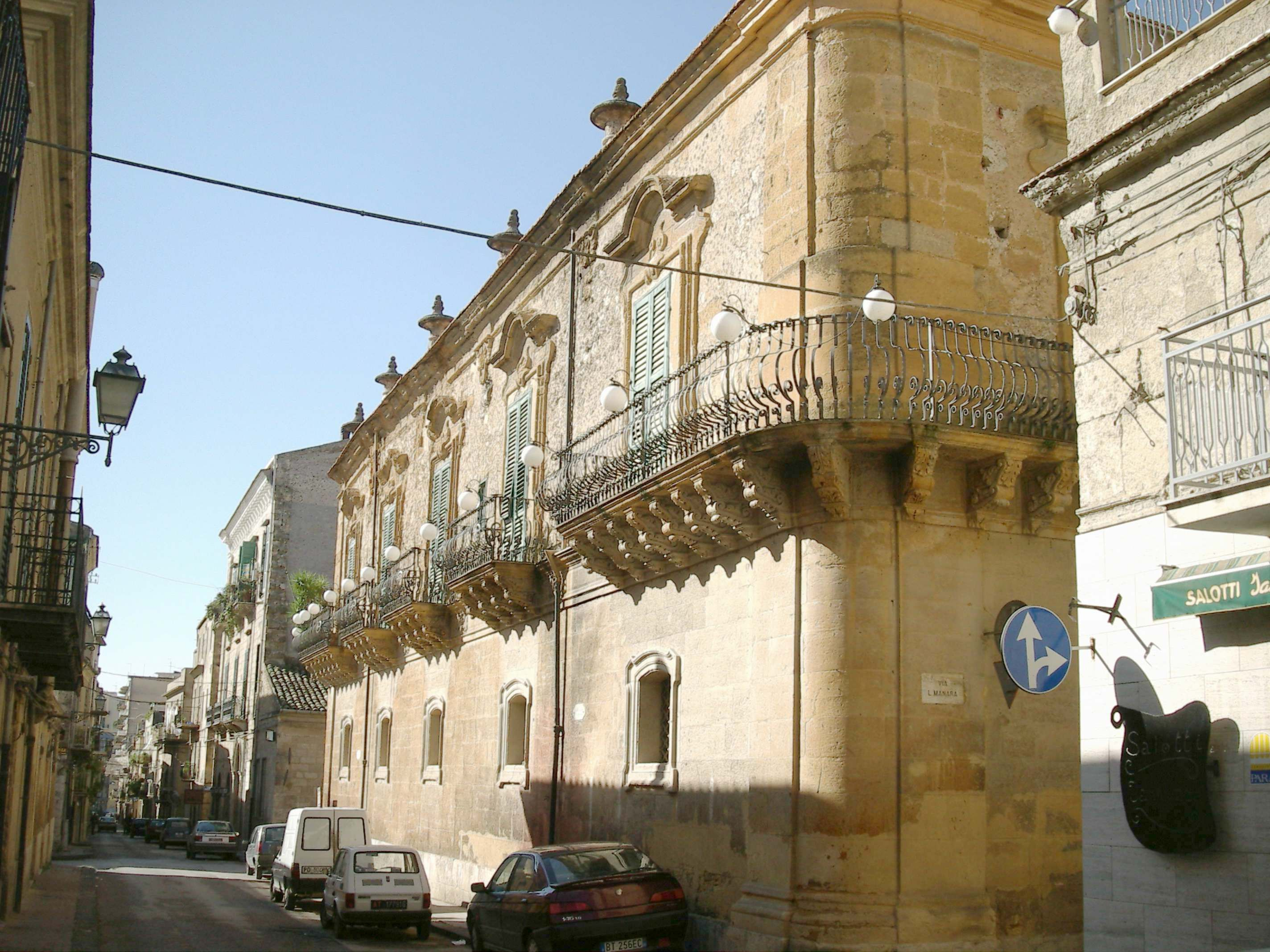
La Lomia Palace

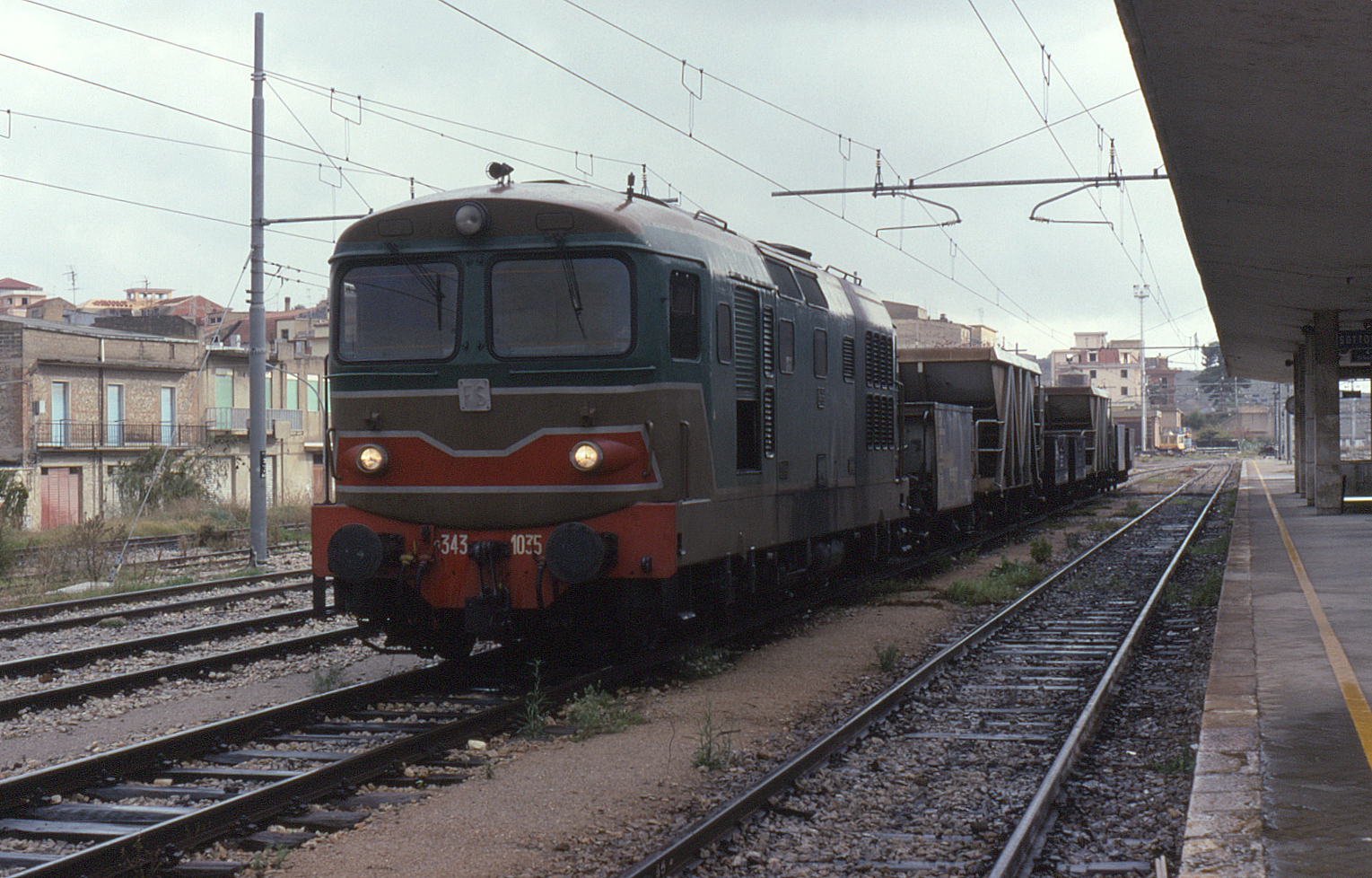
A train at Canicattì station

Canicattì (Italian pronunciation: [kanikatˈti]; Sicilian: Caniattì [kanɪ.at'ti]) is a town and comune (municipality) in the Province of Agrigento in the Italian region Sicily, located about 90 kilometres (56 mi) southeast of Palermo and about 34 kilometres (21 mi) east of Agrigento. In 2026, it had a population of 34,199.

== History ==
The archaeological remains in the city and in the neighbourhood testify the presence of a settlement before the Roman age. The name of Canicattì is of Arabic origin, from خندق الطين Khandaq al-ṭīn, meaning 'clay ditch'. During the conquest of Sicily by the Normans, the local Muslim lord was besieged and defeated by baron Salvatore Palmieri (1087), a follower of Roger I of Sicily: the latter, as reward, offered him a sword and the lordship over the fief. Under the Palmieri rule the Arab fortress was enlarged, becoming a true castle with a tower.

The Normans were followed by the Hohenstaufen and the French Angevines, in turn ousted by the House of Barcelona. In 1448 the fief of Canicattì was ceded by Antonio Palmieri, who was heirless, to his nephew Andrea De Crescenzio, who obtained by king John II of Aragon the Licentia populandi, i.e. the permission to enlarge the fief's boundaries, increase its population and administer justice. Under Andrea De Crescenzio Canicattì was a rural community including some 1000/1500 inhabitants, living in the upper part of the town. Andrea De Crescenzio was succeeded by his son Giovanni, who, having no sons, left the barony to his father-in-law Francesco Calogero Bonanno, in 1507.

Under the Bonannos the town experienced a considerable demographic growth, and several large edifices and fountains were erected. The Bonanno seigniory started to decline from the later 18th century. In 1819 the last Bonanno left Canicattì to baron Gabriele Chiaramonte Bordonaro. After the riots of 1848 and 1859/1861, and the unification of Italy, banks, mills and plants were built in the town, increasing its trades. For the whole 20th century the economy remained based on agriculture (mostly grapes), trades and services. In 1943, it was the seat of the Canicattì massacre, in which American troops killed several Italian civilians who were looting a factory and refusing to disperse despite warnings.

== Geography ==
The municipality, located in the eastern area of the province, at the borders with the one of Caltanissetta, borders with Caltanissetta (CL), Castrofilippo, Delia (CL), Montedoro (CL), Naro, Racalmuto and Serradifalco (CL). The old town of Canicattì is divided into the wards of Borgalino and Badia. Other wards are Acquanova, Rovitelli, and other minor wards named after the local parish churches.

Canicattì is 21 km from Favara, 29 km from Caltanissetta, 34 km from Agrigento, 38 km from Licata, 61 km from Enna and 68 km from Gela.

== Main sights ==
- San Diego
- San Giuseppe
- Chiesa del Purgatorio
- San Francesco
- Santi Filippo e Giacomo
- Calvario
- Chiesa santa Chiara
- Museum photography of Livatino
- House-museum Livatino

== Transport ==
Canicattì railway station is an important hub for local rail transport and, until 2011, it was served by express trains linking Agrigento with Rome, Milan and Turin.

It is a junction point between the lines Caltanissetta-Canicattì-Agrigento and Canicattì-Gela-Syracuse and, until the 1950s, the terminus of two narrow-gauge lines: the Canicattì-Naro (a branch of the Agrigento-Favara-Naro-Licata) and the Canicattì-Riesi-Caltagirone.

== People ==
- Giovanni Canova (1880–1960), fencer
- Salvatore Corsitto (1913–1999), actor
- Gioacchino La Lomia (1831–1905), Capuchin missionary
- Rosario Livatino (1952–1990), magistrate

== See also ==
- Canicattì massacre
