= Nosate =

Nosate Nosàa (Lombard)
- Comune
- Comune di Nosate
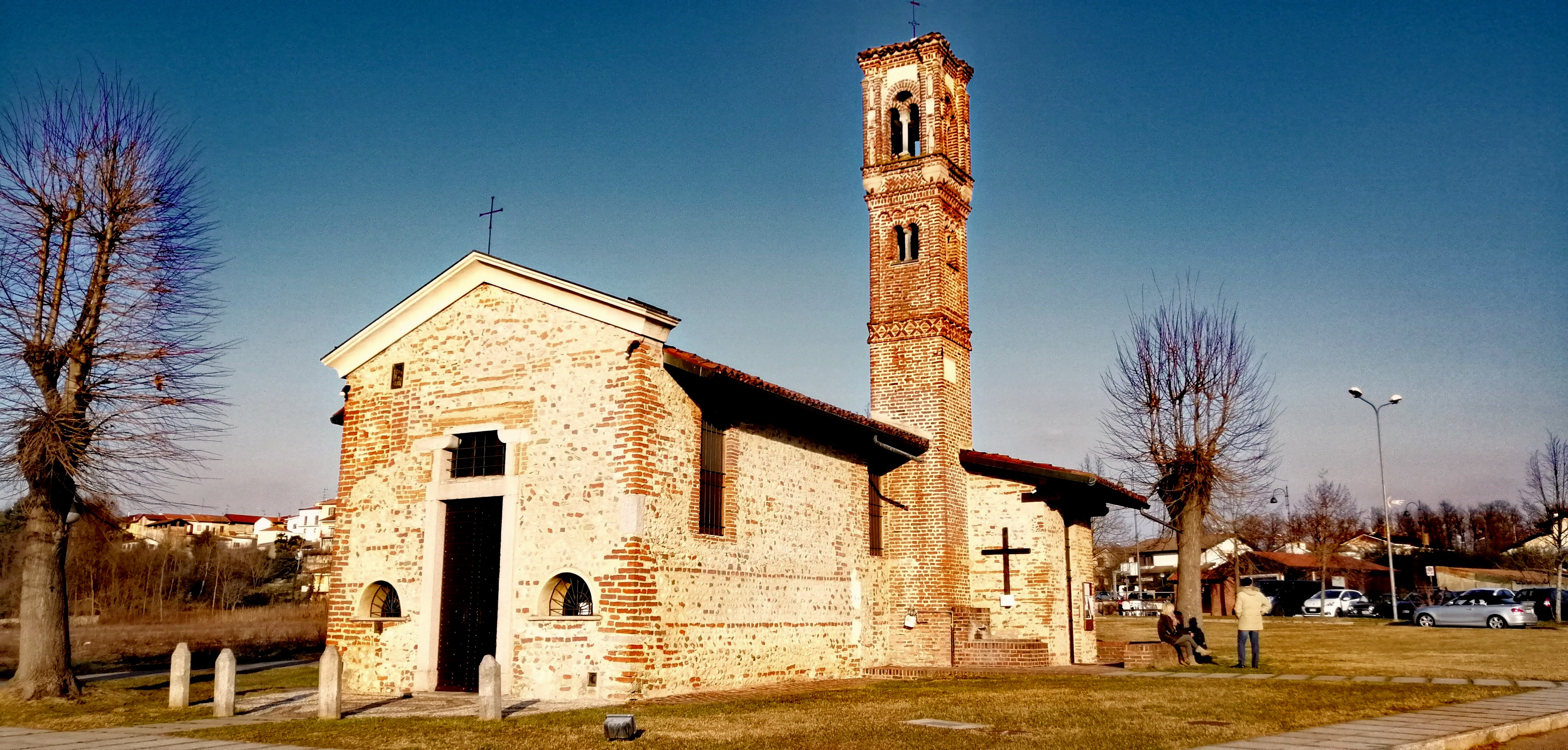
- The church of Santa Maria in Binda

- Location within Italy Location within Lombardy
- Coordinates: 45°33′N 8°44′E
- Country: Italy
- Region: Lombardy
- Metropolitan city: Milan (MI)

Area
  - Total: 5.0 km^{2} (1.9 sq mi)

Population (Dec. 2004)
  - Total: 649
  - Density: 130/km^{2} (340/sq mi)
- Time zone: UTC+1 (CET)
  - Summer (DST): UTC+2 (CEST)
- Postal code: 20020
- Dialing code: 0331

Nosate (Milanese: Nosàa) is a comune (municipality) in the Province of Milan in the Italian region Lombardy, located about 35 kilometres (22 mi) northwest of Milan. As of 31 December 2004, it had a population of 649 and an area of 5.0 square kilometres (1.9 mi^{2}).

Nosate borders the following municipalities: Lonate Pozzolo, Bellinzago Novarese, Castano Primo, Cameri. In addition to Nosate, there are three villages in the municipality: Cascina del Ponte di Castano, Cascina Ponte di Castano, and Case sparse. The eighth century church Santa Maria in Binda is found within the municipality's limits.

== Demographic evolution ==
Historical population

Year	Pop.	±%
1861	480	—
1871	527	+9.8%
1881	570	+8.2%
1901	600	+5.3%
1911	535	−10.8%

Year	Pop.	±%
1921	477	−10.8%
1931	549	+15.1%
1936	534	−2.7%
1951	632	+18.4%
1961	693	+9.7%

Year	Pop.	±%
1971	688	−0.7%
1981	635	−7.7%
1991	612	−3.6%
2001	638	+4.2%

Source: Data from ISTAT
