= Santa Maria Nuova, Marche =

Santa Maria Nuova
- Comune
- Comune di Santa Maria Nuova
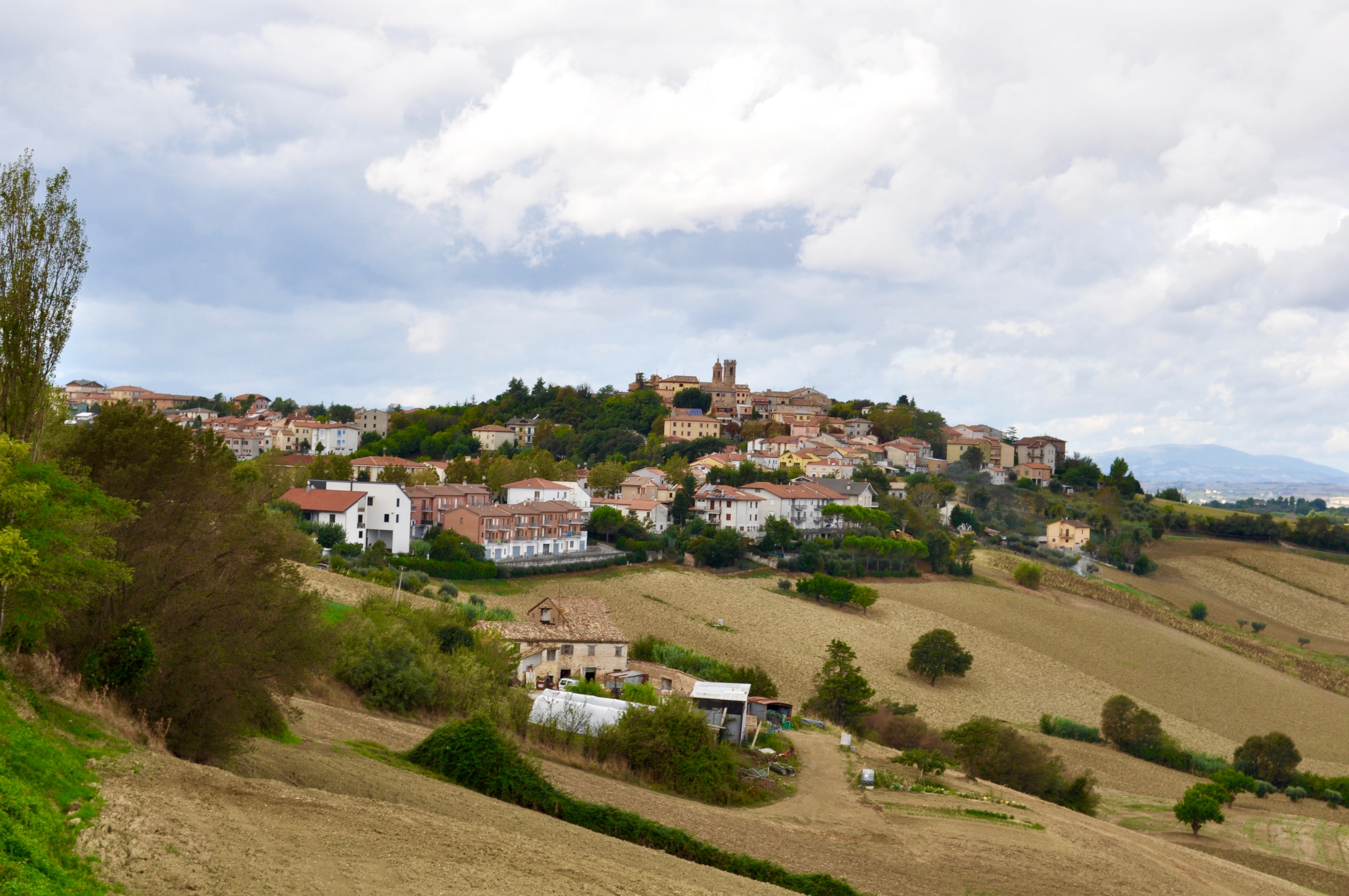

- Coat of arms

- Location within Italy Location within Marche
- Coordinates: 43°30′N 13°19′E
- Country: Italy
- Region: Marche
- Province: Ancona (AN)
- Frazioni: Collina, Monti, Pradellona

Government
  - Mayor: Alfredo Cesarini

Area
  - Total: 18.0 km^{2} (6.9 sq mi)
- Elevation: 249 m (817 ft)

Population (31 December 2016)
  - Total: 4,177
  - Density: 232/km^{2} (601/sq mi)
- Demonym: Santamarianovesi
- Time zone: UTC+1 (CET)
  - Summer (DST): UTC+2 (CEST)
- Postal code: 60030
- Dialing code: 0731
- Website: Official website

Santa Maria Nuova is a comune (municipality) in the Province of Ancona in the Italian region Marche, located about 20 kilometres (12 mi) southwest of Ancona.

Santa Maria Nuova borders the following municipalities: Filottrano, Jesi, Osimo, Polverigi.

Among the churches in the city is the 18th-century church of San Giuseppe and the church of Sant'Antonio di Padova.
