= Cameri =

- Comune
- Comune di Cameri
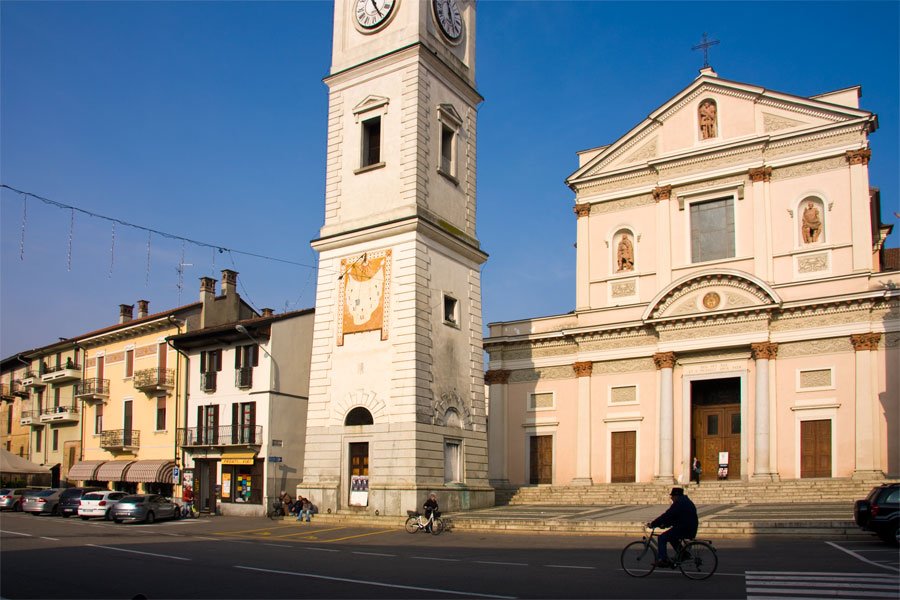
- Piazza Dante with the church of San Michele and bell-tower.

- Coat of arms

- Location within Italy Location within Piedmont
- Coordinates: 45°30′N 8°39′E
- Country: Italy
- Region: Piedmont
- Province: Novara (NO)

Government
  - Mayor: Sindaco Pacileo elected on May 26, 2019

Area
  - Total: 39.6 km^{2} (15.3 sq mi)
- Elevation: 161 m (528 ft)

Population (31 December 2014)
  - Total: 11,033
  - Density: 279/km^{2} (722/sq mi)
- Demonym: Cameresi
- Time zone: UTC+1 (CET)
  - Summer (DST): UTC+2 (CEST)
- Postal code: 28062
- Dialing code: 0321
- Patron saint: St. Michael Archangel
- Website: Official website

Cameri is a comune (municipality) in the Province of Novara in the Italian region of Piedmont, located about 90 kilometres (56 mi) northeast of Turin and about 6 kilometres (4 mi) northeast of Novara.

Cameri borders the following municipalities: Bellinzago Novarese, Caltignaga, Castano Primo, Galliate, Nosate, Novara, and Turbigo. It is home to a military airfield Cameri Air Base (ICAO code: LIMN), now used for maintenance of the Panavia Tornado and Eurofighter Typhoon of the Aeronautica Militare as well as final assembly of Lockheed Martin F-35 Lightning II.

The current mayor of Cameri is Sindaco Giuliano Pacileo, elected on May 26, 2019.

Among the churches is the Madonna di San Cassiano, San Rocco, San Giuseppe, Chiesa del Santissimo Sacramento and Santa Maria Assunta.

== Twin towns ==
Cameri is twinned with:

- Vännäs, Sweden (2003)
