= Bellinzago Novarese =

- Comune
- Comune di Bellinzago Novarese
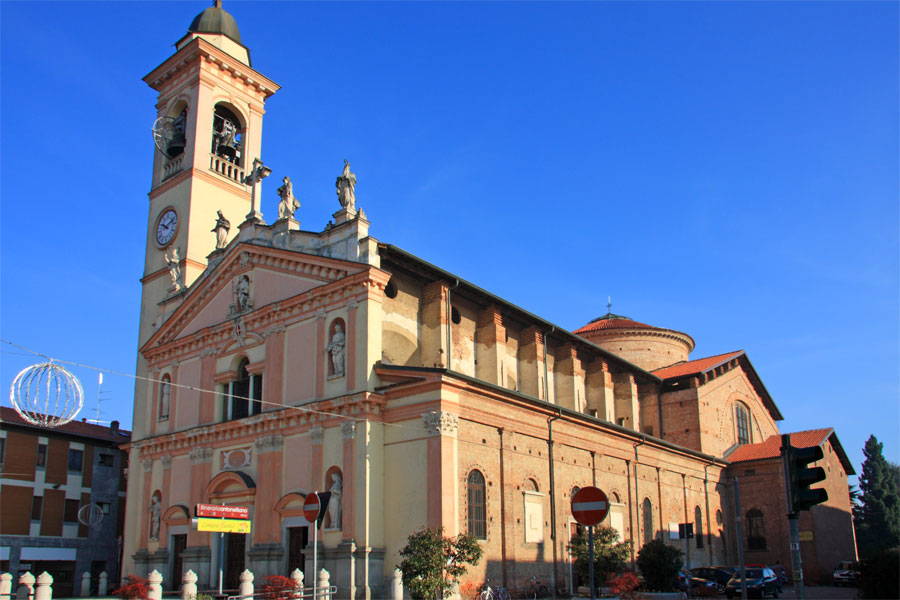
- Church in Bellinzago Novarese

- Location within Italy Location within Piedmont
- Coordinates: 45°35′N 8°38′E
- Country: Italy
- Region: Piedmont
- Province: Novara (NO)
- Frazioni: Badia di Dulzago, Cavagliano

Government
  - Mayor: Fabio Sponghini

Area
  - Total: 39.18 km^{2} (15.13 sq mi)
- Elevation: 192 m (630 ft)

Population (30 April 2017)
  - Total: 9,633
  - Density: 245.9/km^{2} (636.8/sq mi)
- Demonym: Bellinzaghesi
- Time zone: UTC+1 (CET)
  - Summer (DST): UTC+2 (CEST)
- Postal code: 28043
- Dialing code: 0321
- Website: Official website

Bellinzago Novarese (Lombard: Branzagh) is a comune (municipality) in the Province of Novara in the Italian region of Piedmont, located about 90 kilometres (56 mi) northeast of Turin and about 15 kilometres (9 mi) north of Novara.

Bellinzago Novarese borders the following municipalities: Caltignaga, Cameri, Lonate Pozzolo, Momo, Nosate, and Oleggio.

== Architecture ==
San Vito a Cavagliano, Romanesque church

== Sport ==
The association football club Sporting Bellinzago is based in Bellinzago.
