= Santi Filippo e Giacomo, Canicattì =

Church building in Canicattì, Italy

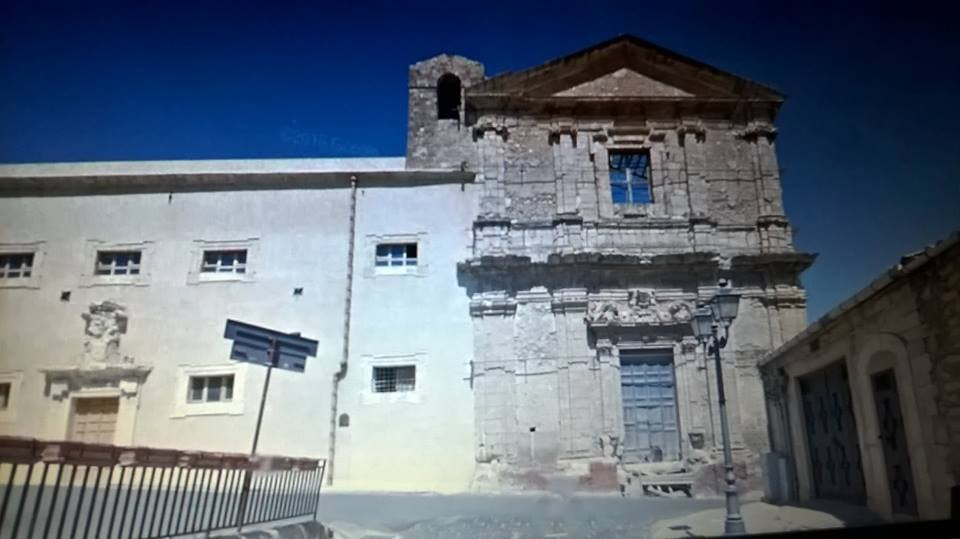
Facade of Santi Filippo e Giacomo

Santi Filippo e Giacomo is a Baroque-style, Roman Catholic former-church built adjacent to a former Benedictine abbey, thus also known as the Chiesa della Badia, in the town of Canicattì, province of Agrigento, region of Sicily, Italy.

== History ==
The abbey was built during the second half of the 17th century, patronized by the Baron Giacomo II Bonanno Crisafi. The ruins are in restoration and part now houses the museo etno-antropologico of the town. The church, now deconsecrated, was completed in 1716, and located at the site of a former Oratory of Santa Barbara, held by a local fraternity.

The decorated and sculpted stone façade still displays the Bonanno Crifasi family coat of arms, depicting a rampaging rooster on a gilded background, with the motto "Nequi sol perdiem nequi lume per noxem".

The church has a single nave with a large choir, where the cloistered monks would gather; it was decorated in the early 18th century by followers of Giuseppe and Giacomo Serpotta. The interiors, have undergone various renovations. The chapels of the Crucifix and of the Blessed Virgin of the Hope (della Speranza, also known as Madonna d'oltremare or Our Lady of Overseas) were refurbished. The altars to Gesù Bambino (Jesus Child) and Santa Barbara were redone. However since the Second World War, poor conservation led to collapse of the vault, and the structure is now dilapidated.
