= Gioacchino La Lomia =

Italian Roman Catholic priest

Venerable Gioacchino La Lomia OFMCap
- Born: Gaetano La Lomia; 3 March 1831; Canicattì, Agrigento, Kingdom of the Two Sicilies
- Died: 30 July 1905 (aged 74); Canicattì, Agrigento, Kingdom of Italy

Gioacchino La Lomia (3 March 1831 – 30 July 1905) – born Gaetano La Lomia, religious name Gioacchino Fedele da Canicattì, was an Italian religious priest from the Order of Friars Minor Capuchin. La Lomia served as part of a papal-commissioned mission to Brazil where he dedicated himself to works of evangelization and the preservation of culture. He was a noted preacher and served as a confessor to Emperor Pedro II.

La Lomia's beatification process was opened in 2002, and in 2002 he was named as venerable upon confirmation of his life of heroic virtue.

== Life ==
Gaetano La Lomia was born on 3 March 1831 in Canicattì as the seventh of nine children to the baron Nicolò La Lomia and Eleonora Agostino ( 1799–15.3.1879); the couple married on 11 October 1818. One brother was Francesco Salvatore. His maternal grandparents were Ferdinando Agostino and Rosalia Li Chiavi and his maternal great-grandfather was Marco Agostino. His nephew was the writer Agostino Fausto La Lomia (30.1.1905-21.1.1978). He received baptism from Biagio Salamone and his godparents were Emanuele and Carolina La Lomia.

He decided to become a Franciscan after he heard the Capuchin priest Michele da San Cataldo preach. La Lomia entered the Order of Friars Minor Capuchin on 4 November 1851 where he assumed the religious name of "Gioacchino Fedele da Canicattì" and was vested on 12 December 1852 before he was ordained to the priesthood in Palermo on 2 June 1855; he had received the tonsure and minor orders the previous 2 March. La Lomia made his solemn profession in Agrigento on 5 November 1853 and since 1861 underwent his theological and philosophical studies at Caltanissetta. On 27 June 1864 he left for Rome to learn Portuguese. He served in the missions in the Amazonian Forest in Brazil from March 1868 until 1880 at the behest of Pope Pius IX who commissioned the Franciscan-led mission. He departed from Sardinia on 13 January 1868 and arrived first in Rio de Janeiro in March. Together with other brothers in the mission he preached the Gospel to thirteen villages and dedicated himself to the improvement of the health and the wellbeing of the Brazilian people as well as to the improvement of culture in the region; he also baptized converts to the faith. Ill health forced him to stop his work and return to his homeland and he left on 14 January 1880 to arrive in Rome on 1 April. It was upon his return that his nephew Nicolò La Lomia informed him that his mother had died on 15 March 1879.

He returned to his homeland in 1880 and established the convent for the order at Canicattì in the Madonna della Rocca church. He was famous for performing miracles both in Brazil and in his homeland and he was a noted preacher and evangelist. His charismatic and humble nature was recognized and even Emperor Dom Pedro II of Brazil acknowledged him and had La Lomia hear his confessions.

La Lomia preached his final mission starting on 6 April 1903 and knew around Easter that his life was coming to a close. On 28 July 1905 he was bought to his cell window to impart his blessing to the faithful who kept their vigil outside. La Lomia died in his convent at 8:00pm on 30 July 1905. Doctor Sciacca embalmed him on 31 July and his funeral was celebrated on 1 August lasting over three hours; his remains were relocated on 21 April 1912.

== Beatification process ==
The beatification process for La Lomia began in the Archdiocese of Agrigento. Archbishop Giovanni Battista Peruzzo oversaw the informative phase of investigation from 1949 until its closure in 1951. The documents and other collected information from the archdiocese was sent to the Congregation for Rites but the cause remained dormant for some time until the Congregation for the Causes of Saints began assessing the documents and validated the informative process on 26 April 1985.

The postulation later compiled and submitted the positio. On 23 April 2002 Pope John Paul II proclaimed La Lomia to be venerable after confirming that the friar had lived a model life of heroic virtue.

There here was a miracle attributed to La Lomia's intercession in France and was investigated with that process ending sometime in 2016; the documents were sent to the C.C.S. in March 2017 for further evaluation. The postulator for this cause is the Carlo Calloni OFM.

== Music ==
In the 1970s, there was the first recording of "The Padre Gioacchino Song" in the Sicilian region on 45rpm that Cesare d'Ambra undertook; the orchestration was performed under the direction of Maestro Giuseppe Buttice.
