= Sant'Antonio di Padova, Santa Maria Nuova =

Church in Marche, Italy

Coordinates: 43°29′45.2″N 13°18′32.38″E

Sant'Antonio di Padova is a Neoclassic-style, Roman Catholic church located facing Piazza Magagnini in the town of Santa Maria Nuova, region of Marche, Italy.

== History ==
The church was designed in 1793 by the architect Mattia Capponi, but only built in 1884. The altar has a modern polychrome ceramic decoration by Vitali da Foligno and an organ from the 18th century. It has two altarpieces of note: an Enthroned Madonna with Child and Saints Roch and Sebastian (1598) by Filippo Bellini, and an Immaculate Conception with San Filippo Neri and San Nicola da Bari (1658) by Marcantonio Aquilini. The ceiling has a fresco painted by the Caprari of Osimo depicting a veduta of town of Santa Maria Nuova in the 1920s, as well as three saints venerated by peasants and herders: San Vincenzo Ferreri (Protector against Lightning), Sant'Emidio (Protector against earthquakes) e Sant'Antonio Abate (Protector of farm animals).
