= Santa Maria in Binda, Nosate =

Roman Catholic church in Nosate, Italy

Coordinates: 45.54916°N 8.7224°E

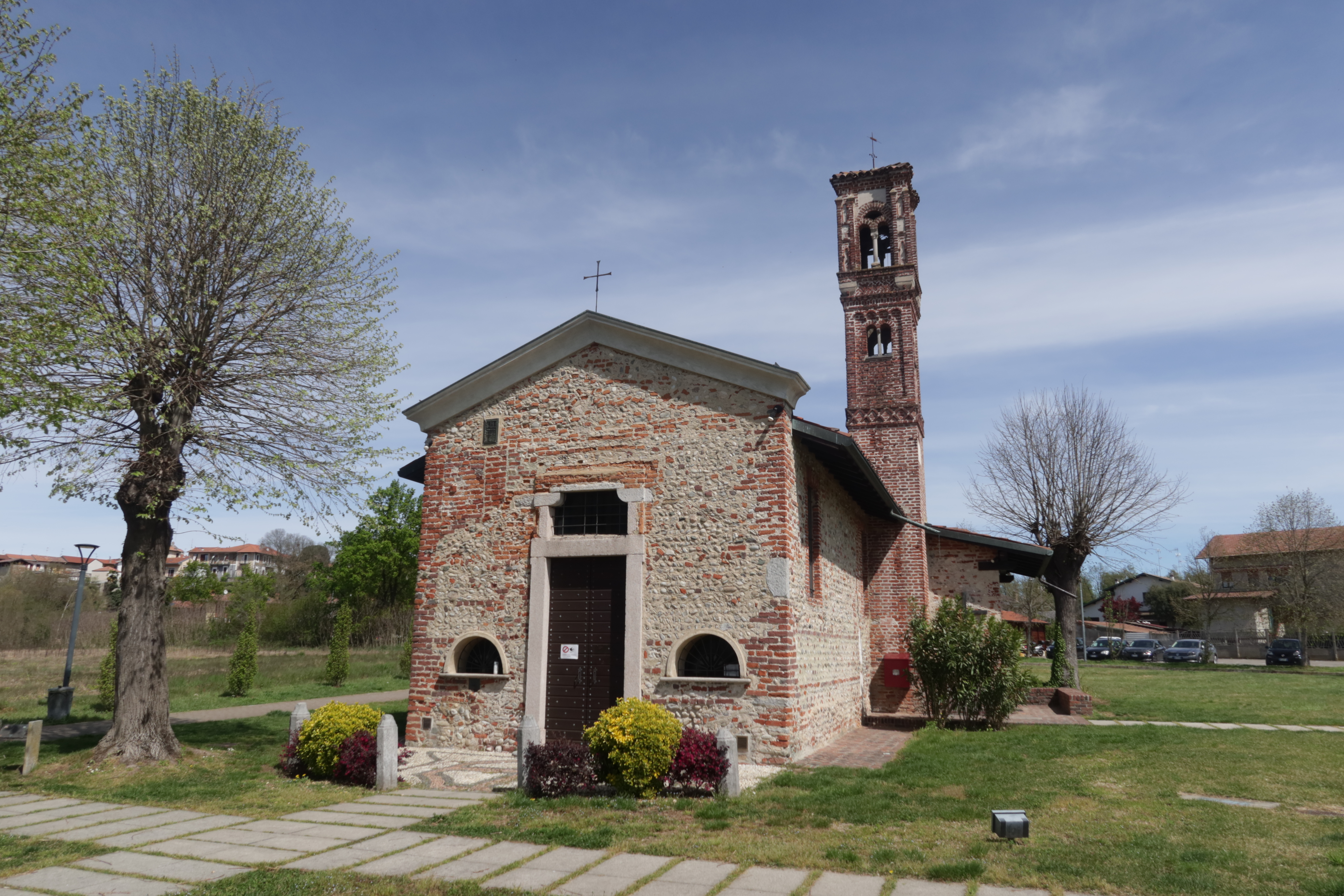
Nosate Chiesa di Santa Maria in Binda.jpg

Santa Maria in Binda is an ancient and small church or chiesetta, built in Romanesque-style church in Nosate in the Province of Milan, northern Italy.

== History ==
This church was built here in the 8th century during the Lombard rule of the area; the word Binda in the Lombard language meant a stretch of land, meant to be a stretch of land near the river. Originally and even till the 18th-century, this church served in funeral rites for nearby burials. The Interior was frescoed in the 16th century. The bell-tower, in a Neo-Romanesque style was added in 1926. The church has some anonymous frescoes in a somewhat provincial style from the 15th century, including some depicting various clerics and well-dressed men in a danse macabre.
