= Villa Igiea =

Hotel in Palermo

Coordinates: 38.1453°N 13.3701°E

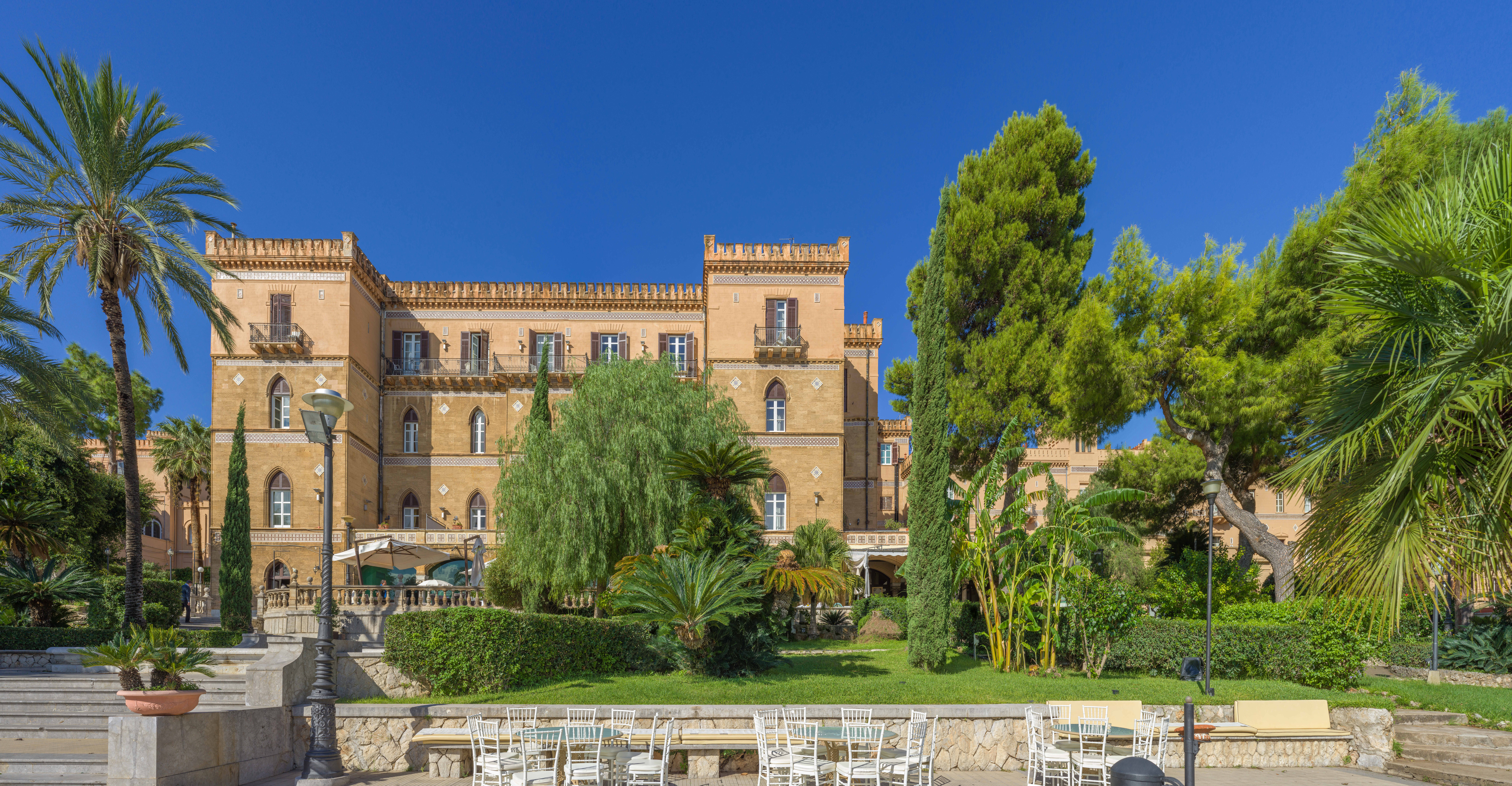
View from Gardens

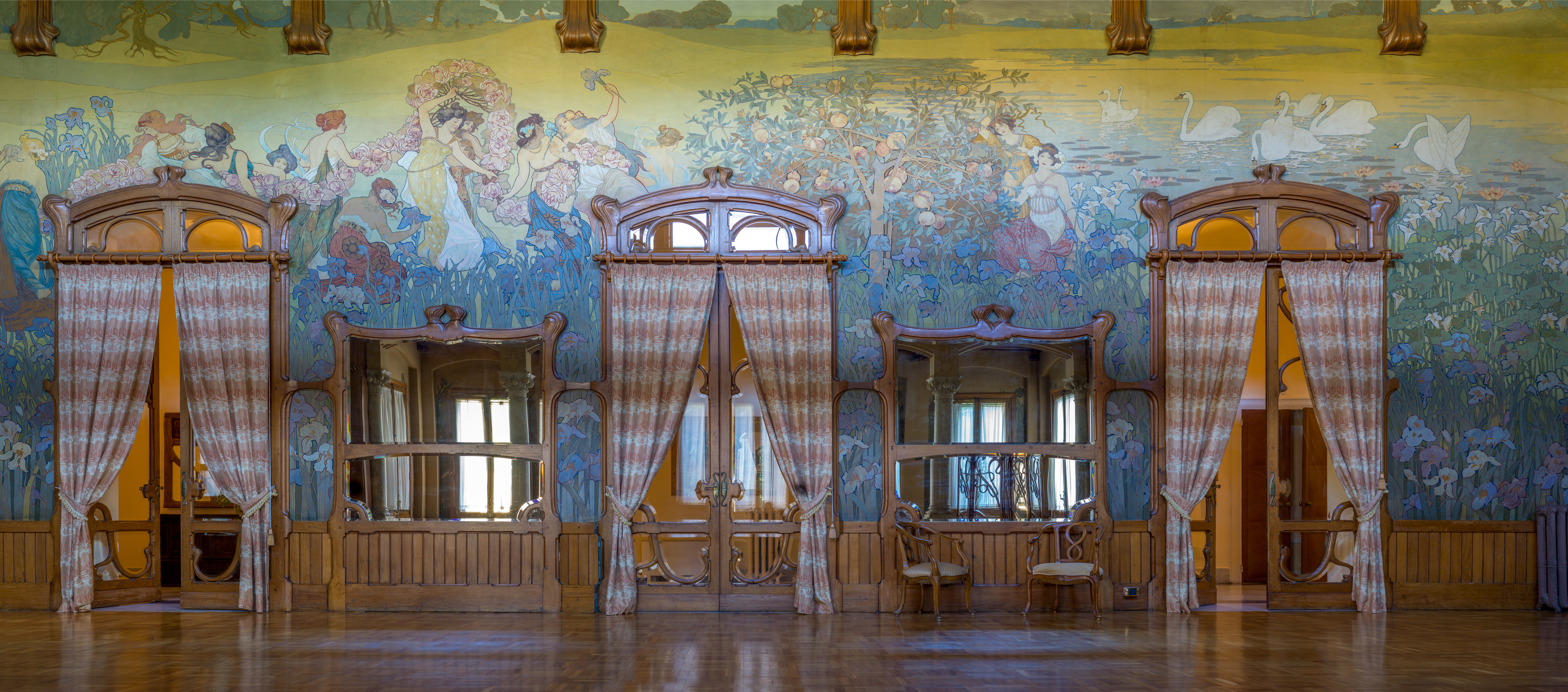
Sala degli Specchi frescoed by Bergler.

Villa Igiea is a neogothic former residence, now a luxury hotel maintaining some of the Art Nouveau (Liberty) refurbishment completed at the dawn of the 20th-century; the hotel sits on a high outcrop overlooking the sea at Porto dell'Acquasanta, located on Salita Belmonte #43 in the quartiere of Pellegrino of the city of Palermo, Sicily, Italy.

== History and description ==
The structure was originally built in the late 19th-century as a castle-like villa built for the retired British admiral Cecil (or William) Domville, and purchased by the wealthy businessman Ignazio Florio junior, who planned to convert the site into a tuberculosis sanatarium. Their daughter had tuberculosis. This prompted the name change to Villa Igiea, to echo the name of Hygeia, a nymph from Greek mythology associated with health and hygiene. However, Florio was forced by investors to change plans, and commissioned a refurbishment from the architect Ernesto Basile, in order to create a luxury hotel, inaugurated in 1900. The hotel still retains much of the floral decoration, including frescoes by Ettore De Maria Bergler and Giovanni Enea, and some of the decor by Vittorio Ducrot. The original dining salon of the hotel with Bergler frescoes is known as the Sala degli Specchi or Sala Basile.

The property had fallen in decline by the second world war. It has only recently returned to function as a hotel.
