= San Giuseppe, Santa Maria Nuova =

Church building in Santa Maria Nuova, Italy

San Giuseppe is a late-Baroque-style, Roman Catholic church located on Via Garibaldi in the town of Santa Maria Nuova, region of Marche, Italy.

== History ==
The church was built in 1762. The interiors are elaborately decorated in stucco, and it contains an altarpiece attributed to the Aquilini.
