= San Giuseppe, Ragusa =

Church in Ragusa, Italy

Coordinates: 36.9257°N 14.7448°E

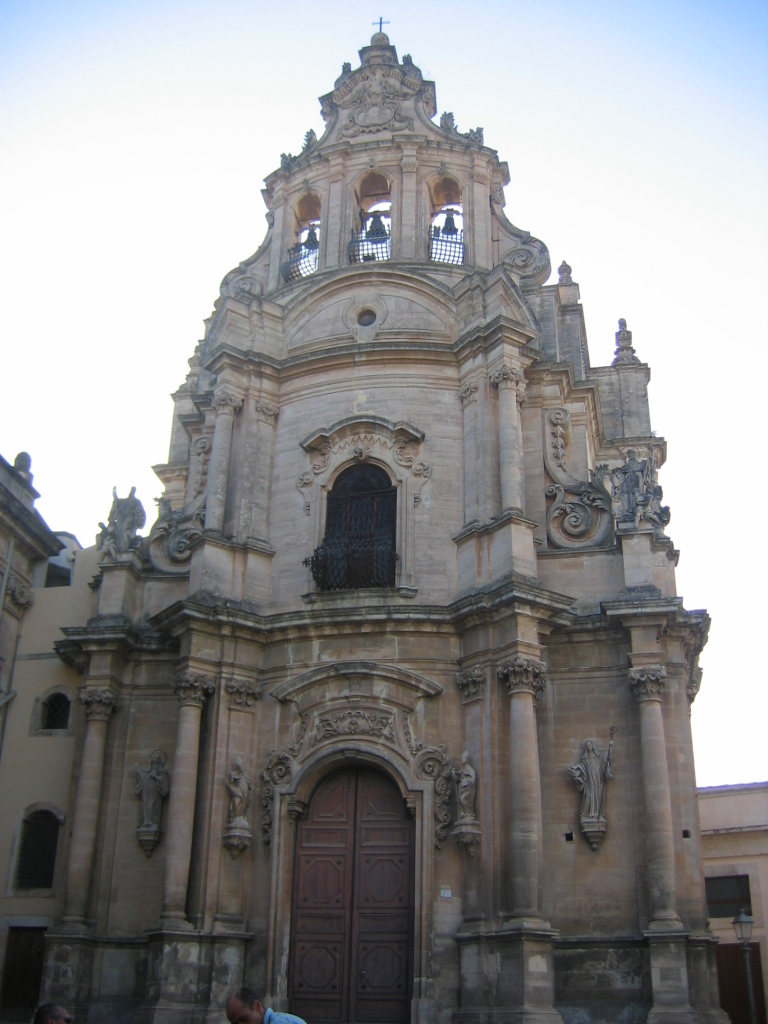
San Giuseppe, Ragusa

San Giuseppe ("St Joseph") is a Baroque-style, Roman Catholic church located in the city of Ragusa, in southern Sicily, Italy.

== History ==
A church was erected here in 1756-1796 under the patronage of the Benedictine order. The church and an adjacent convent of nuns occupied a site where prior to the 1693 earthquake, a church dedicated San Tommaso had been located. The architect is unknown, but in the circle of Rosario Gagliardi. Like many local churches, the façade has three highly sculpted orders, decorated with statues of saints of the Benedictine orders, including Saints Benedict and Mauro above and Saints Gertrude and Scholastica below. Flanking the entrance are statues of St Pope Gregory the Great and St Augustine by Giambattista Muccio in 1775. Above the entrance portals were iron grillwork screens (1774) by Filippo Scattarelli; these screens allowed the nuns to view religious processions.

The interior has an oval layout, but kept a large choir and coretti situated over the entrance and flanking the nave, where the nuns could hear the mass while remaining cloistered from the public. The vault fresco depicts a Glory of St Benedict with St Joseph (1793) by Sebastiano Monaco. The walls are elaborately stuccoed (1793) by Agrippino Maggiore and the Cultrera family from Licodia Eubea. The altars (19th century) have elaborate scagliola, and have altarpieces by Tommaso Pollace and Giuseppe Crestadoro, depicting the Trinity, St Mauro, St Benedict, and Ste Gertrude. The pavement has white stone and maiolica tiles. The vestibule has statues depicting St Benedict (17th century) and a silver-coated St Joseph (1785).
