= San Giuseppe, Cuneo =

Hamlet in Cuneo, Italy

San Giuseppe
- Hamlet
- Location in Italy
- Coordinates: 44°43′50″N 7°55′26″E
- Country: Italy
- Region: Piedmont
- Province: Cuneo
- Municipality: Sommariva Perno

Area
  - Total: 0.37 km^{2} (0.14 sq mi)
- Elevation: 277 m (909 ft)

Population (2022)
  - Total: 446
  - Density: 1,200/km^{2} (3,100/sq mi)
- Time zone: UTC+1 (CET)
- Postal code: 12040

San Giuseppe is a hamlet in the province of Cuneo, Italy, 2.5 kilometers away from its municipal center, Sommariva Perno. San Giuseppe's population consists of 446 people:

- 222 males
- 242 females
- 26 foreigners
- 220 people aged 15 or above
- 187 families

As of 2022, San Giuseppe has 172 buildings, although only 153 are used for residential purposes, 16 roads, a church, a holiday home, a bakery, a beekeeping center, and a restaurant.
