= San Giuseppe, Cameri =

Church building in Cameri, Italy

Coordinates: 45.50182°N 8.65694°E

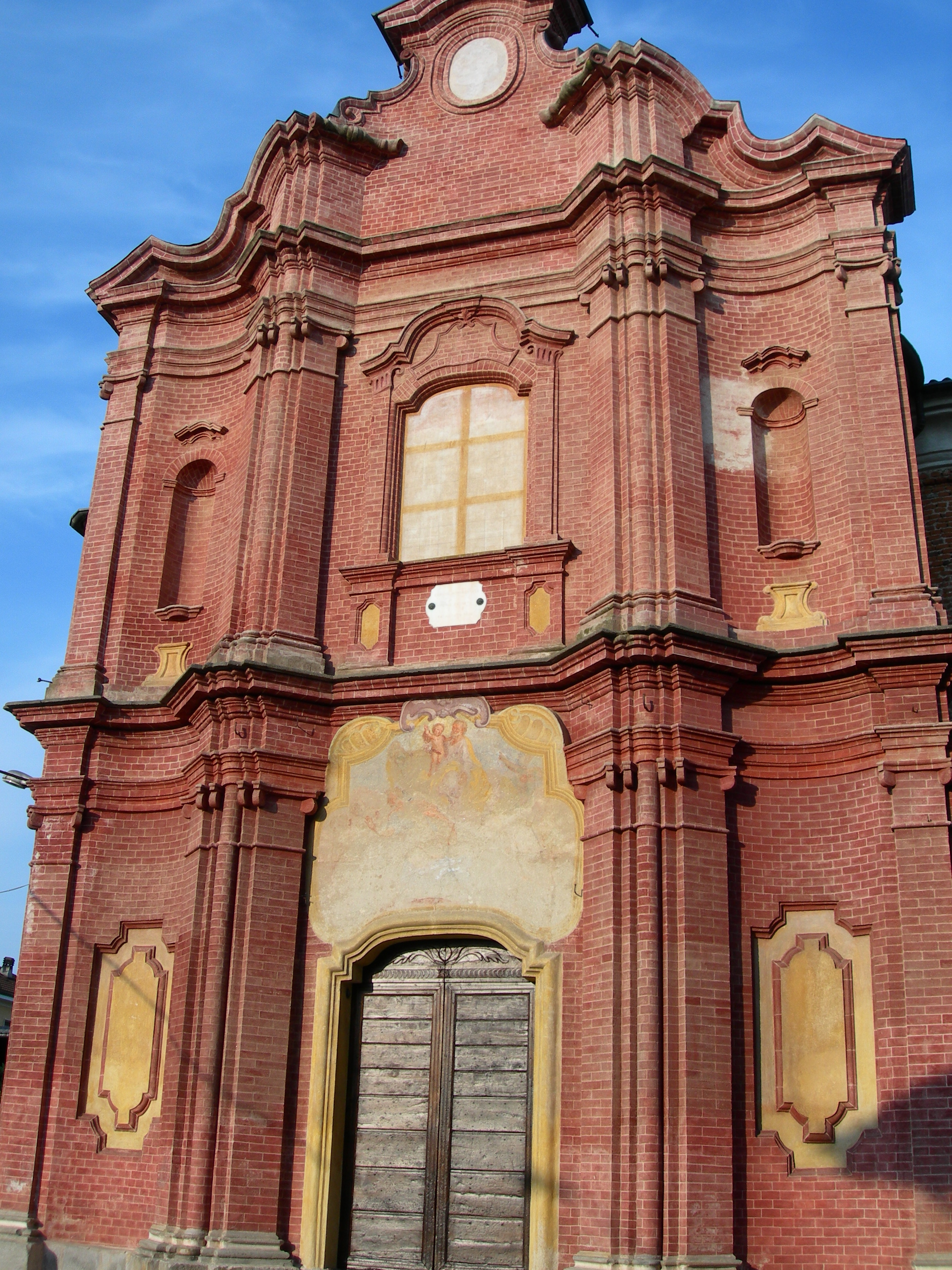

San Giuseppe is a Baroque-style, Roman Catholic church, or oratory, located on Via San Giuseppe corner with Via Matteotti in the town of Cameri, province of Novara, Piedmont, Italy.

== History ==
The church was erected between 1757 and 1762 at the site of the former lazaretto (leprosarium) of the town. Tradition was that the town in unison paid and worked on the construction of the church, passing by hand the bricks in a long file.

The interior has frescoes (1763-1764) completed by Lorenzo Peracino “il vecchio”. The façade has a fresco depicting St Joseph and the Child Christ with an angel. In 1905, the church was classified a National Monument.
