= San Giuseppe, Siena =

Roman Catholic church in Siena, Tuscany, Italy

Coordinates: 43°18′55″N 11°19′55″E

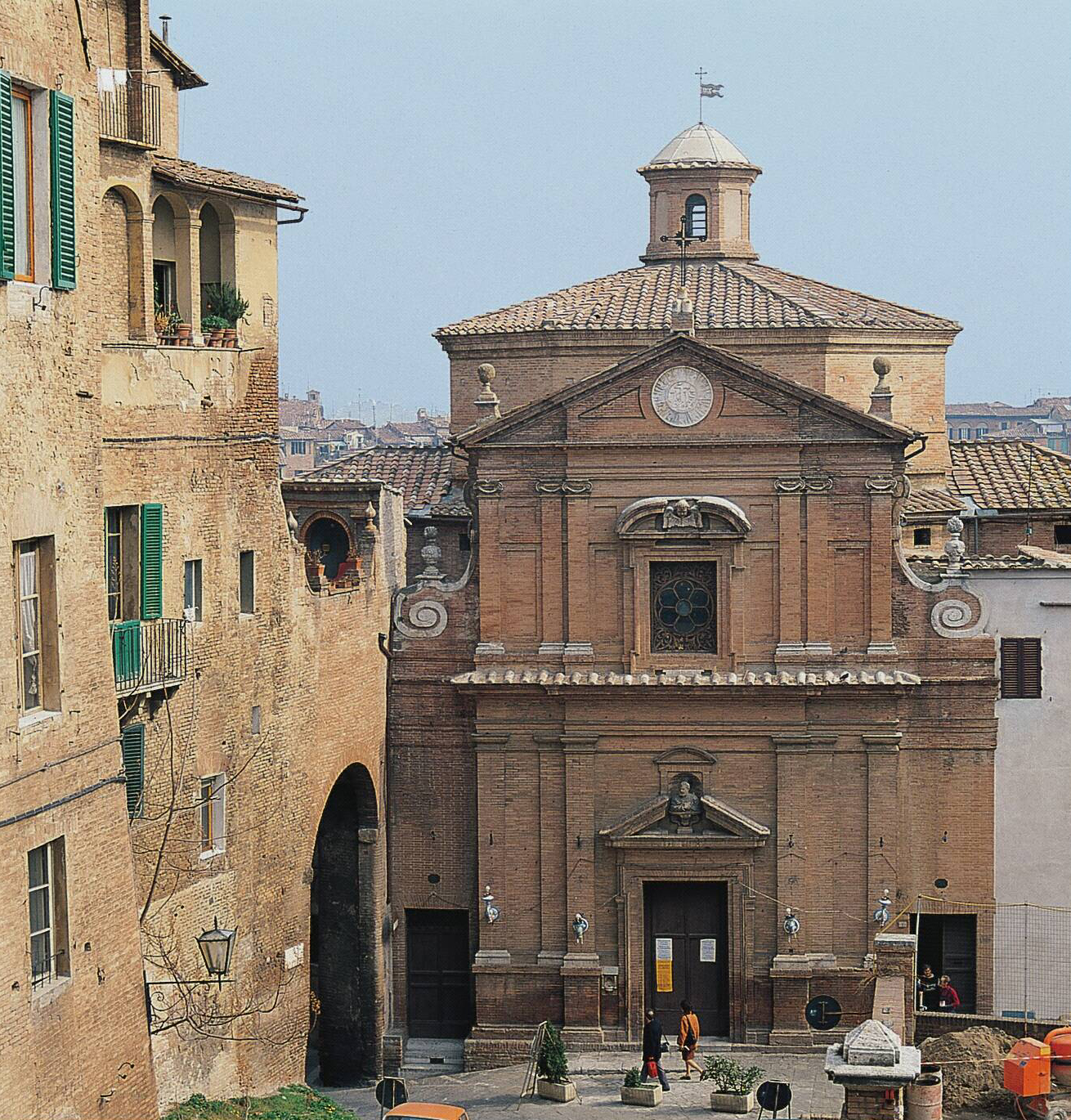
Church of San Giuseppe

San Giuseppe is a Roman Catholic church in Siena, Tuscany, Italy. It was designed by Baldassare Peruzzi.

== History ==
The church was commissioned by the contrada dell'Onda and begun in 1521. Construction continued for the whole century.

== Architecture ==
The façade, finished in 1653, is mostly in brickwork, with two superimposed orders divided by pilaster strips. The interior is on the Greek Cross plan, surmounted by an octagonal dome with a lantern. Decoration is attributed to the Nasini family. The crypt, a suggestive 16th century hall, contains the contrada's museum.
