= San Giuseppe, Siracusa =

Church in Sicily, Italy

San Giuseppe
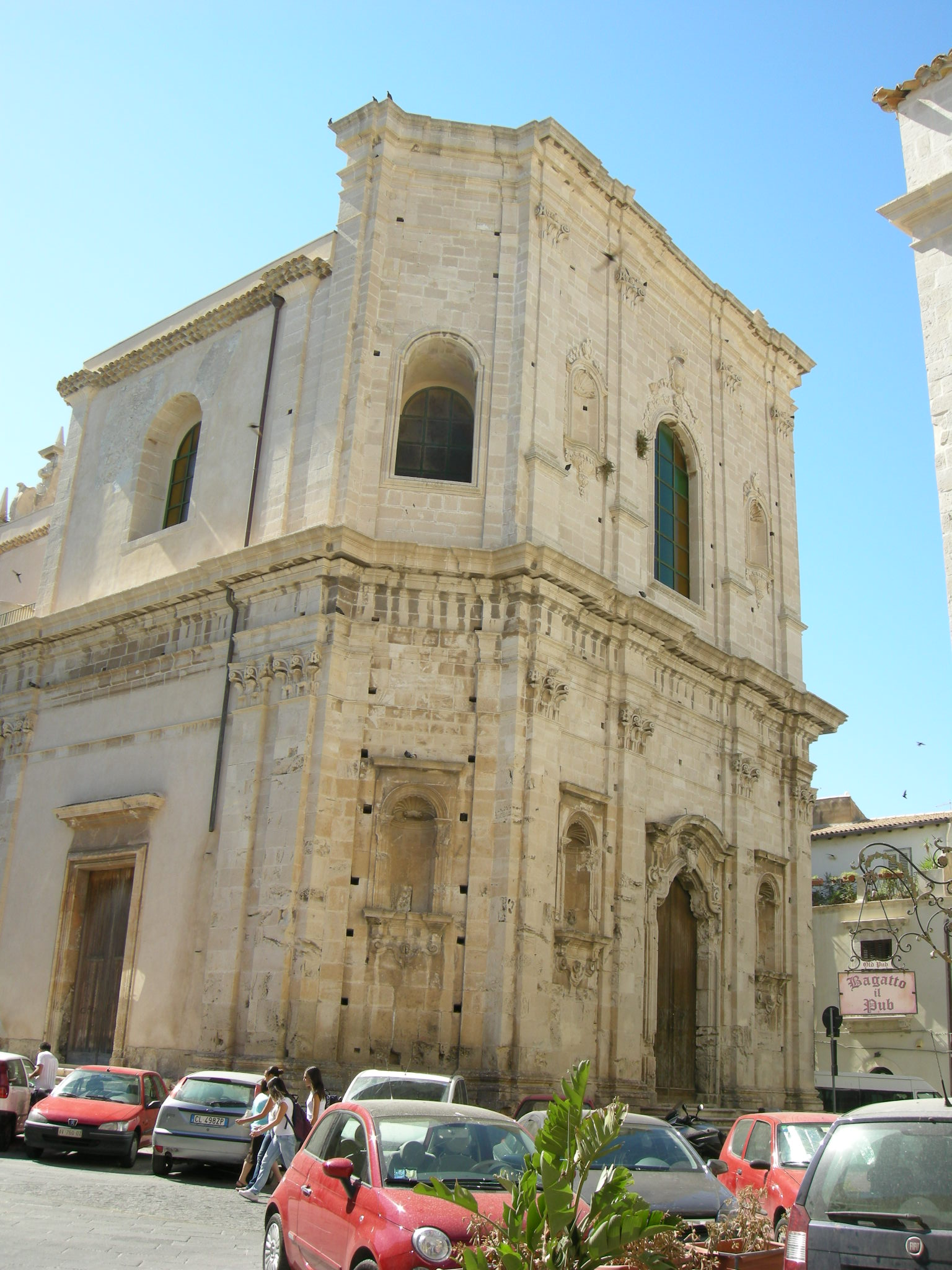
- Facade

Religion
- Affiliation: former Catholic Church
- Province: Siracusa

Location
- Location: Siracusa, Italy
- Interactive map of San Giuseppe

Architecture
- Type: Church
- Style: Baroque
- Completed: 1727

San Giuseppe (St Joseph) is a baroque-style, Roman Catholic church located in the piazza of the same name, across the street from the church of San Domenico, on the island of Ortigia, in the historic city center of Siracusa in Sicily, Italy.

== Description ==
Like many churches in Siracusa, early documentation is sparse. The present church was built in the 18th century, atop the ruins of a church dedicated to San Fantino. That church had followed Greek orthodox rites. To raise the funds to build a new church, the Confraternity of the Falegnami (carpenters), sold their prior church, San Giuseppe il Vecchio, located on vicolo Santa Anna to the Congregation of the Coccieri e Staffieri (coachmen and grooms). That old church was soon demolished.

Construction of San Giuseppe was led by Carmelo Bonaiuto, named Carancino, and completed in 1773. The piazza in past centuries was surrounded by two large monasteries: that of Aracoeli and San Domenico. The latter's church is across the piazza. Also across the piazza is the former Palazzo Midiri, now home to a nautical institute.

The front and lateral portals of the church are approached through stairs. Atop the portal are two heraldic shields, one surmounted by a crown.

The church is badly in need of repairs, both inside and the exterior. The niches in the exterior are bare. The interior once housed a copy of Caravaggio's altarpiece depicting the Burial of St Lucy by his follower Mario Minniti. The church has suffered from vandalism and burglary.
