= Santissimo Sacramento, Cameri =

Church building in Cameri, Italy

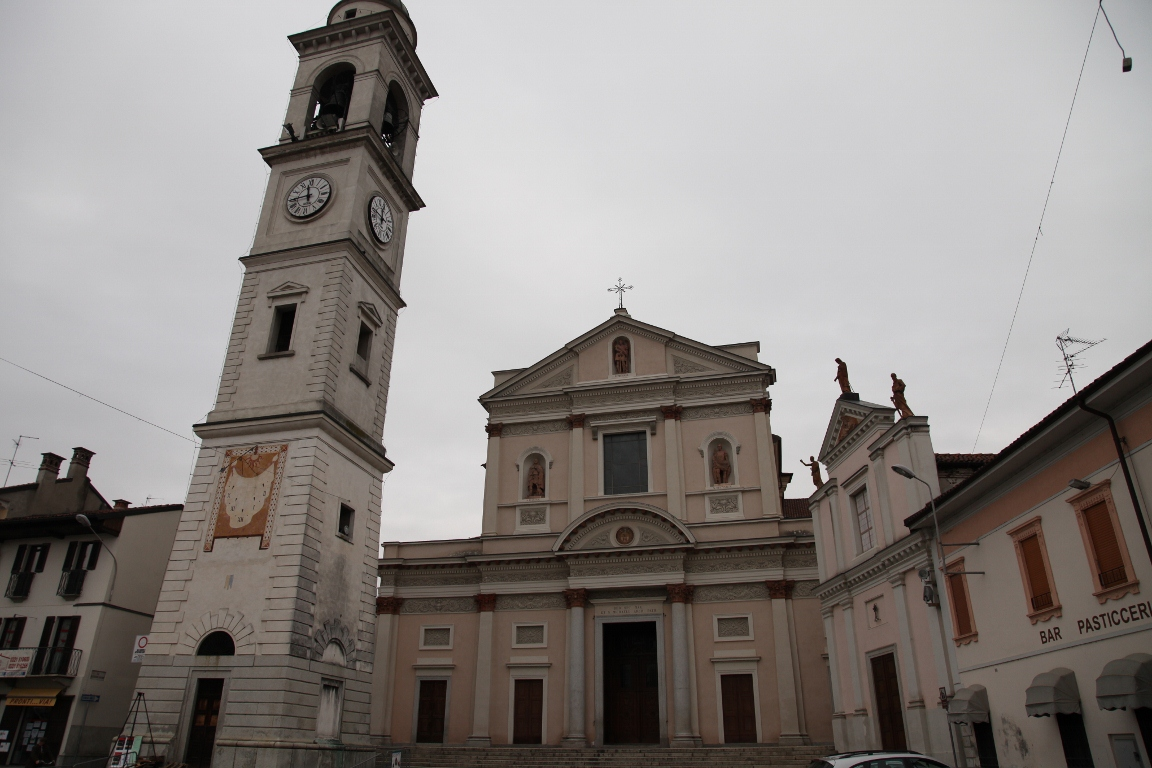
Santissimo Sacramento and San Michele, churches in Cameri, Italy, november 2010.jpg

Santissimo Sacramento (Holy Sacrament), is a Roman Catholic church located on Piazza Dante Alighieri, adjacent to the parish church of San Michele in Cameri, province of Novara, Piedmont, Italy.

== History ==
The church was originally an oratory for a flagellant confraternity, known as the Rossi or red for the processional gowns worn by the group. The confraternity then became the Confraternita del SS. Sacramento. The 16th-century façade was restored in 2002, the roofline has statues of the Saints Bartholemew, Peter, and Paul. The interior at present is undecorated. The church was dedicated to the Holy Trinity and San Bartolomeo.
