= Chiesa del Purgatorio, Canicattì =

Roman Catholic church in Sicily, Italy

Coordinates: 37°21′38″N 13°51′00″E

The Chiesa del Purgatorio is a Rococo-style, Roman Catholic church located on Piazza IV Novembre in the town of Canicattì, province of Agrigento, region of Sicily, Italy.

== History ==
The site was occupied until 1798 by a prison. Construction of the church, or oratory, was patronized by Baron Gaetano Adamo and his brother Carlo; and construction was pursued from 1803 until 1806, when it was consecrated by the Bishop of Agrigento. Until 1880, it was occupied by the Confraternity del Purgatorio.

The façade is framed by pilasters and cornices of sandstone. The tympanum is crowned with decorative acroterial pyxes or urns. In the center is an oval window, surmounted by a medallion with a bas relief showing Souls in Purgatory (1804) by Vincenzo Spinoso. Adjacent is a belltower embedded in a structure with a façade with niches and a statue.

The interior single nave is covered by a barrel vault. Many of the artworks are derived from other churches. In the choir are two altarpieces from the church of Santa Rosalia, depicting the martyrdoms of St Bartholomew and St Agatha, both attributed to Gaetano Guadagnino.
