= Rosario Bagnasco =

Italian sculptor

Rosario Bagnasco (1845 in Palermo – ?) was an Italian sculptor, both in stone but mainly in wood, active mainly in Palermo, Sicily. He is also known as Rosario Bagnasco Bonetti.

Another Rosario Bagnasco (1810-1879), also from Palermo, was also a sculptor, but mainly remembered as a politician and prominent patriot, along with his brother, Francesco, a legal advocate. The relationship between these two is unclear. They both belong to a large family of wood sculptors, including Girolamo Bagnasco (died 1832).

The sculptor Rosario, born 1845, studied design with his uncle, a painter, but was apprenticed in modelling in clay with the sculptor Nunzio Morello. From there he worked with Giovanni Duprè in Florence, and then in Rome with Giulio Monteverde. He returned to Palermo, in 1873, and won a contest by completing a bas relief in marble depicting Frederick II placing the first stone for the Palazzo della Citta. In 1880, he wins another award in Catania. His residence in Palermo may have not allowed his skills to be used to the fullest.

Among his works, A First Pain, completed in Florence, and awarded silver medal at the Exposition of Siracusa; The Madwoman, (stucco); The Fallen Angel (stucco); The Hurricane (marble); Gifts of Wind and Dawn, statuettes in marble; The Women of Messina (stucco); The Sicilian Vespers, (Scene in stucco); Busts of Maestro Petrella and Filippo Parlatore.
