= San Michele, Cameri =

Church in Cameri, Italy

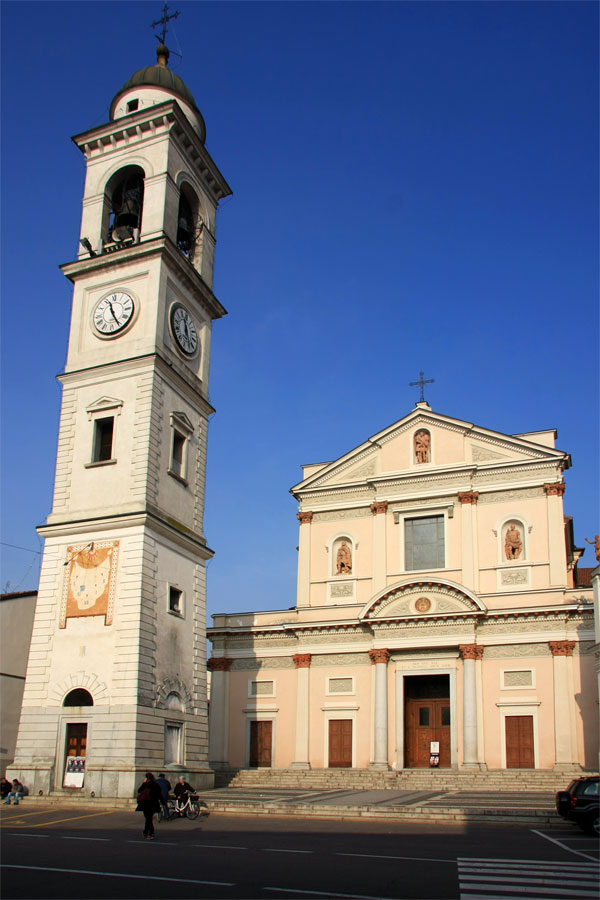
San Michele in Cameri

San Michele, locally called in dialect, Gésa Granda, is the Roman Catholic parish church located in the city center at Piazza Dante Alighieri in the town Cameri, province of Novara, Piedmont, Italy.

== History ==
A church at the site is documented since 1100, dedicated to the town's patron along with Santa Gregoria. That church was razed to build a larger one between 1583 and 1591. It has undergone numerous refurbishments during the 17th and 18th centuries. The facade was restored in 2002.

On the facade are statues of the Saints Secondo, Roch, and the Archangel Michael. In the center of the facade is the original coat of arms of the town. The layout is that of a Latin Cross with a large cupola at the center of the crossing.

The interior houses some 17th-century marble altars in the lateral chapels. The main altar (1866) was built in Neoclassical-style with sculpted wood angels. The chapel in the east transept houses the relics of Santa Gregoria. The fresco decoration is from the 19th century. The main organ was built by Bernasconi and inaugurated in 1902. It was restored in 1990.

The original belltower is suspected to have been a defensive tower affiliated with a house or castle. Since 1618, the tower has had a clock. It has four bells. This tower was in danger of collapse and in 1827, we replaced by the present tower, 42 meters tall.
