= Ernesto Basile =

Italian architect

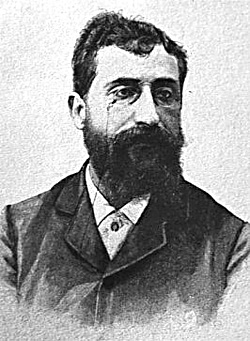
- Ernesto Basile
- Born: 31 January 1857; Palermo, Kingdom of the Two Sicilies
- Died: 26 August 1932 (aged 75); Palermo, Kingdom of Italy
- Known for: Architecture
- Notable work: Teatro Massimo, Palazzo Montecitorio
- Movement: Art Nouveau

Ernesto Basile (31 January 1857 – 26 August 1932, in Palermo) was an Italian architect and an exponent of modernisme and Liberty style, the Italian variant of Art Nouveau. His style was known for its eclectic fusion of ancient, medieval and modern elements.

== Life ==
He was born in Palermo to a father Giovanni Battista Filippo Basile was also an architect and a professor at the University of Palermo. Ernesto graduated in 1878 as an architect in Palermo in the Royal School of Engineering and Architecture (Italian: Regia Scuola di Applicazione per Ingegneri e Architetti). During the 1880s he lived in Rome. There in 1887 he married Ida Negrini and became assistant professor at the University of Rome. In the following years he was appointed professor of technical architecture in the University of Rome. At that period of his life he travelled in Brazil and in Spain. In 1890 he succeeded his father Giovanni, who died in 1891, as a professor of architecture. Ernesto Basile died on 26 August 1932 in Palermo.

== Career ==
After graduation Basile took part in many architecture competitions. Ernesto Basile created a stylistic hybrid consisting of Roman, Norman and Arab influences. His father had started the construction of the opera house Teatro Massimo Vittorio Emanuele in Palermo on 12 January 1874 but it was stopped for eight years from 1882 until 1890. From 1891 until the completion of the project on 16 May 1897 Basile was the supervising architect of the building. In 1881 Basile took part in a competition held by Francesco Crispi the President of the Council of Ministers of Italy, regarding the reconstruction of Palazzo Montecitorio, seat of the Italian Chamber of Deputies. In 1903 his project for the new parliamentary hall was selected and presented by the Prime Minister of Italy Giovanni Giolitti. Basile fused the Roman classicist and Baroque elements of the building with Art Nouveau imagery. The construction of the Italian parliament in the Art Nouveau style was one of the most important moments of early modernism in architecture. It was completed in 1927. In 1911 he was the architect of the construction of the town hall of Reggio Calabria. From 1907 until 1912 he built the Palazzo della Cassa Centrale di Risparmio in Palermo. In 1913-14 he built the Kursaal Biondo theatre, which had asymmetrical Baroque elements, in Palermo.

== Notable works ==
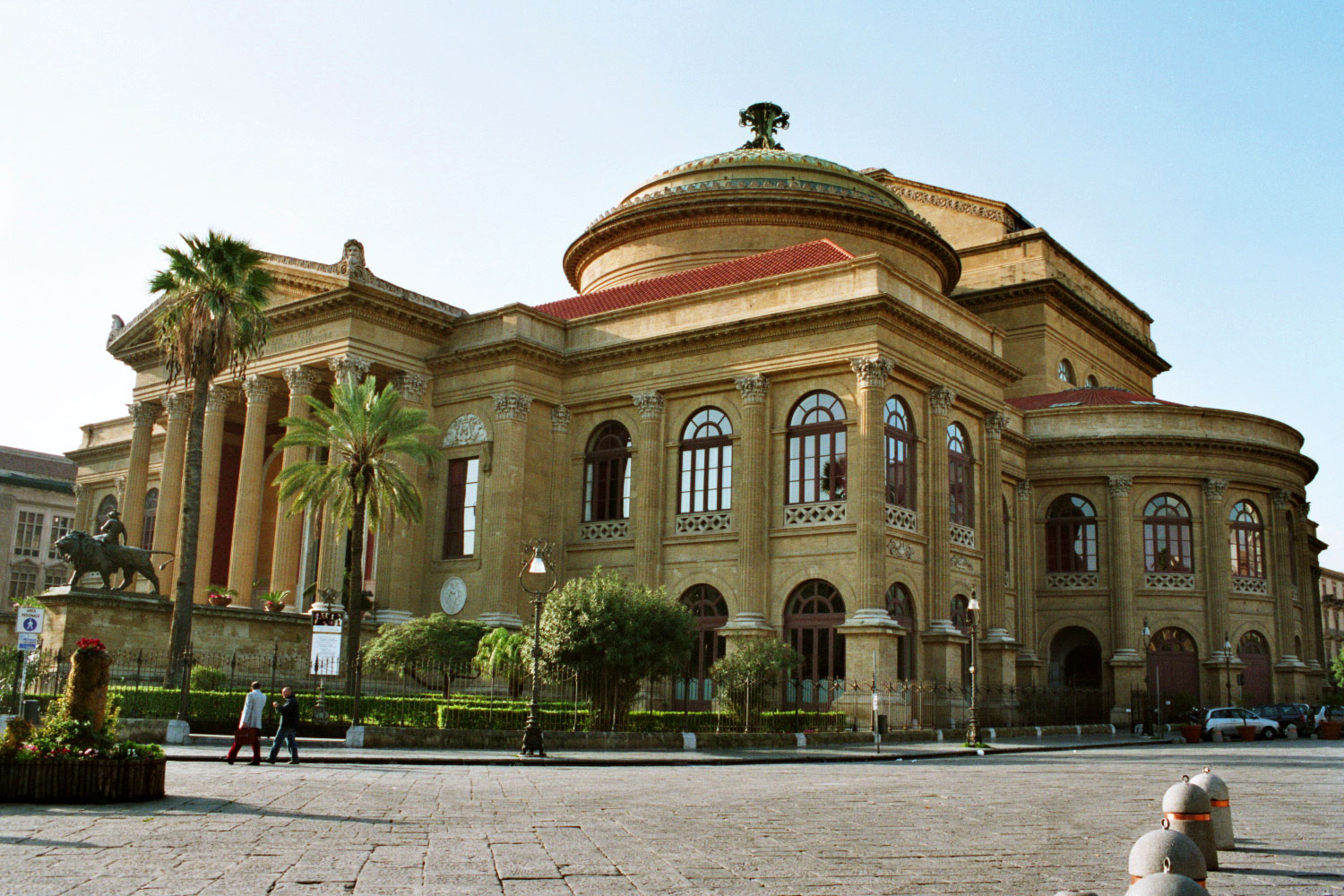
Teatro Massimo in Palermo

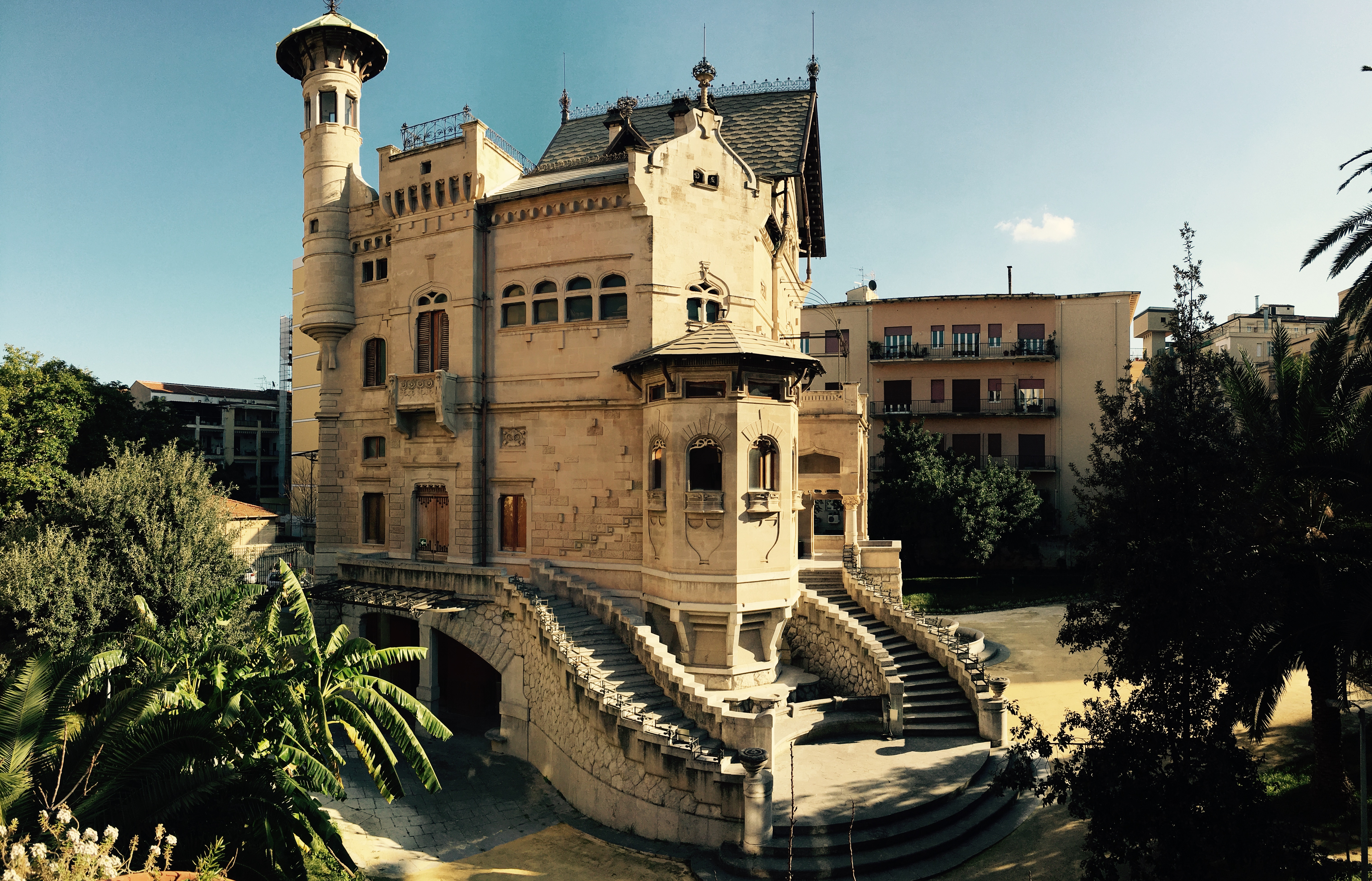
Villino Florio in Palermo (1899-1902)

- Villino Basile in collaboration with his father Giovanni Basile, 1874–78.
- National Exhibition in Palermo, in Arab-Norman style, 1891–92.
- Memorial in Calatafimi-Segesta, in order to commemorate the victory of Giuseppe Garibaldi against the Bourbons, 1892.
- Teatro Massimo in Palermo, 1891–97.
- Palazzo Francavilla, renovation, 1893
- Villa Firriato in Canicattì, 1898.
- Social theatre in Canicattì, 1898.
- Florio Vincenzo villa in Palermo, 1899.
- Grand Hotel Villa Igiea in Palermo, 1899–1900.
- Villino Florio in Palermo, 1899–1902.
- Tomba Raccuglia in Palermo, 1900.
- Cappella Lanza di Scalea, 1900.
- Palazzo Montecitorio, seat of the Italian Chamber of Deputies in Rome, 1903–27.
- Villino Fassini in Palermo, 1903.
- Villino Ida Basile (named after his wife Ida Negrini), 1903–04.
- Villa dei Principi Deliella, 1905–07.
- Stand Florio in Palermo, 1906.
- Municipal Hall of Licata, 1906.
- Palazzo Bruno di Belmonte in Ispica, 1906.
- Florio Pavilion in Milan, 1906.
- Centre of electric power in Caltagirone, 1907.
- Expansion of Grand Hotel in Palermo, 1907.
- Palazzo della Cassa Centrale di Risparmio in Palermo, 1907–12.
- Square of the Sardinian in Messina, 1909.
- Villa Manganelli in Catania, 1909–14.
- Palazzo delle Assicurazioni Generali Venezia in Palermo, 1912.
- Town Hall of Reggio Calabria, 1918–21.
- Kursaal Biondo theatre in Palermo, 1913–14.
- Cassa di Risparmio in Messina, 1926–27.
- Church of Saint Rosalia in Palermo, 1928.

== Writings ==
- Sculptures and plasters of Giacomo Serpotta (Italian: Le sculture e gli stucchi di Giacomo Serpotta), 1911.
- Architecture and the beginnings of its renewal (Italian: Architettura dei suoi principii e del suo rinnovamento), 1882.
