= San Giuseppe, Vigevano =

Church in Vigevano, Italy

Coordinates: 45°19′10.4″N 8°51′26.8″E

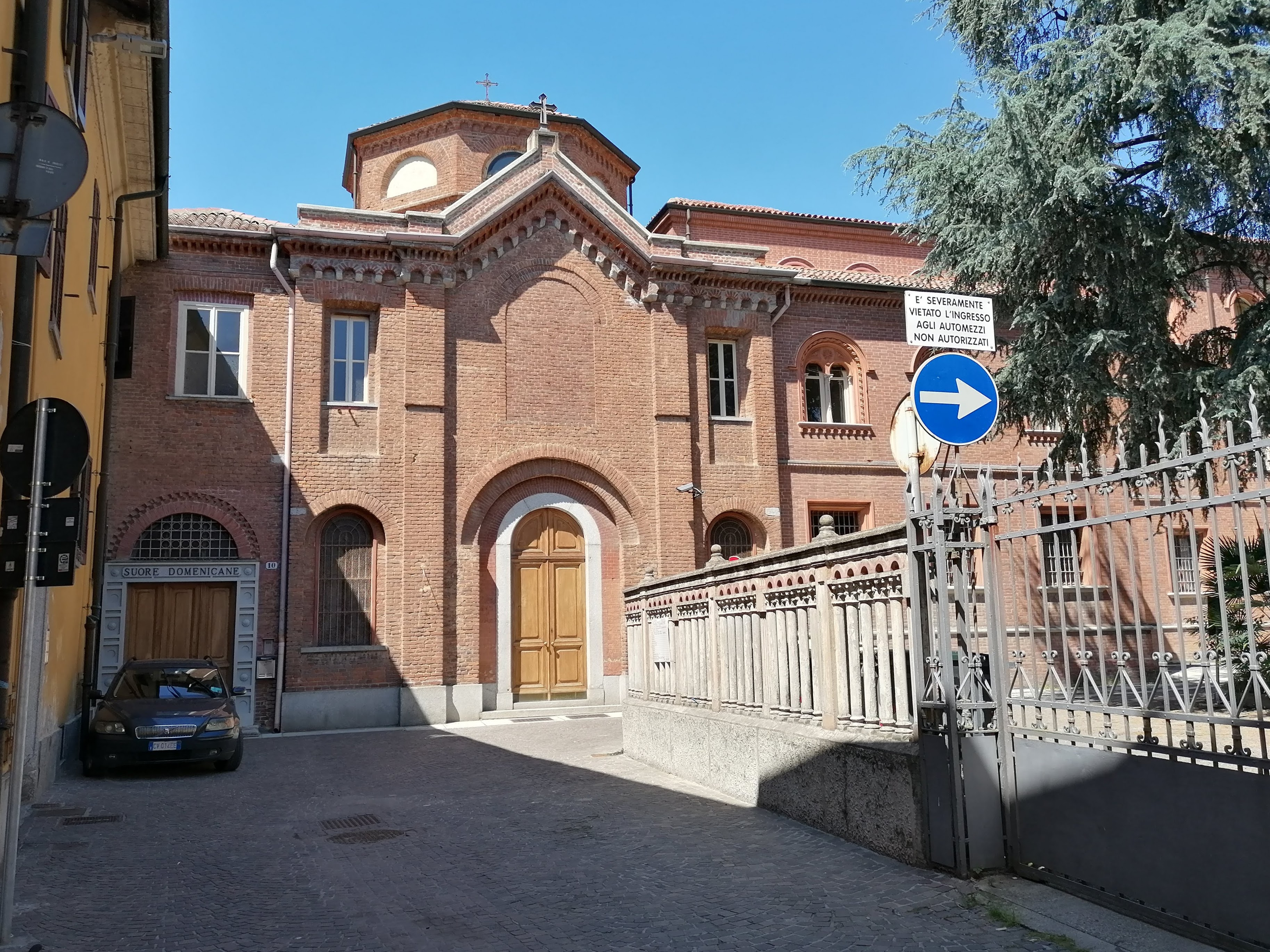
The church.

The church of San Giuseppe is a religious building located in Vigevano, in province of Pavia and diocese of Vigevano.

== Description and history ==
In 1881, Monsignor De Gaudenzi asked four nuns, coming from Novara, to open a boarding school for young girls in via Griona. In 1913, given the significant progress, this was moved to via Deomini. Currently the institute includes nursery, elementary, middle and high school and is run by Dominican nuns.

Attached to the San Giuseppe institute, there is the church. Built in Carrara marble, it was the first Italian church to be consecrated to the Sacred Heart, in 1876. The small building included two altars dedicated to the Sacred Heart and Saint Joseph, with valuable paintings. However, towards the end of the twentieth century, the little church underwent various renovations, which completely changed its structure.

Inside the institute, however, there are two paintings from the Lombard school of the late sixteenth century: a Madonna in adoration with Saint Dominic, Saint Catherine and the blessed Matteo Carreri, framed by fifteen small paintings reproducing the joyful mysteries. Also interesting is a Saint Dominic receiving the rosary from Heaven, from the same period as the previous one.

Finally, in a small room one can admire one of the last frescoes by Vittorio Ramella, depicting a Crucifixion.
