= Victor Maurus =

Christian martyr and saint

Saint Victor the Moor
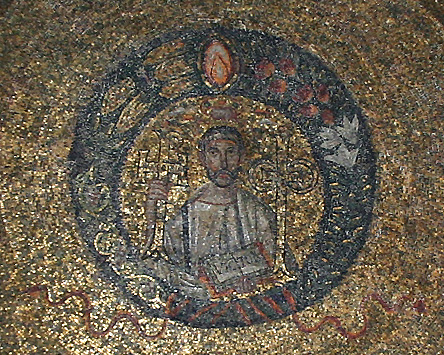

Martyr
- Born: 3rd century Mauretania, Africa
- Died: c. 303; Milan, Italy
- Venerated in: Eastern Orthodox Church; Roman Catholic Church; Lutheranism
- Feast: 8 May
- Attributes: man being thrown into a furnace; man roasted in an oven; Moorish soldier trampling on a broken altar
- Patronage: Varese, Italy; Ceriano Laghetto, Italy

Victor the Moor (in Latin: Victor Maurus) (born 3rd century in Mauretania; died ca. 303 in Milan) was a native of Mauretania and a Christian martyr, according to tradition, and is venerated as a saint.

== Life ==
Victor, born into a Christian family, was a soldier in the Roman Praetorian Guard under Maximian. In the "Acts", which date back to the 8th century, it is said that Victor refused to continue his military service. Dragged to the Hippodrome of the Circus in the presence of Maximian Herculean and his adviser Anulinus, he refused to betray his beliefs despite the torments to which he was subjected. Whipped and imprisoned, after an almost miraculous escape, he was again captured. He was dragged into a nearby elm wood and decapitated around the year 303.

== Veneration ==
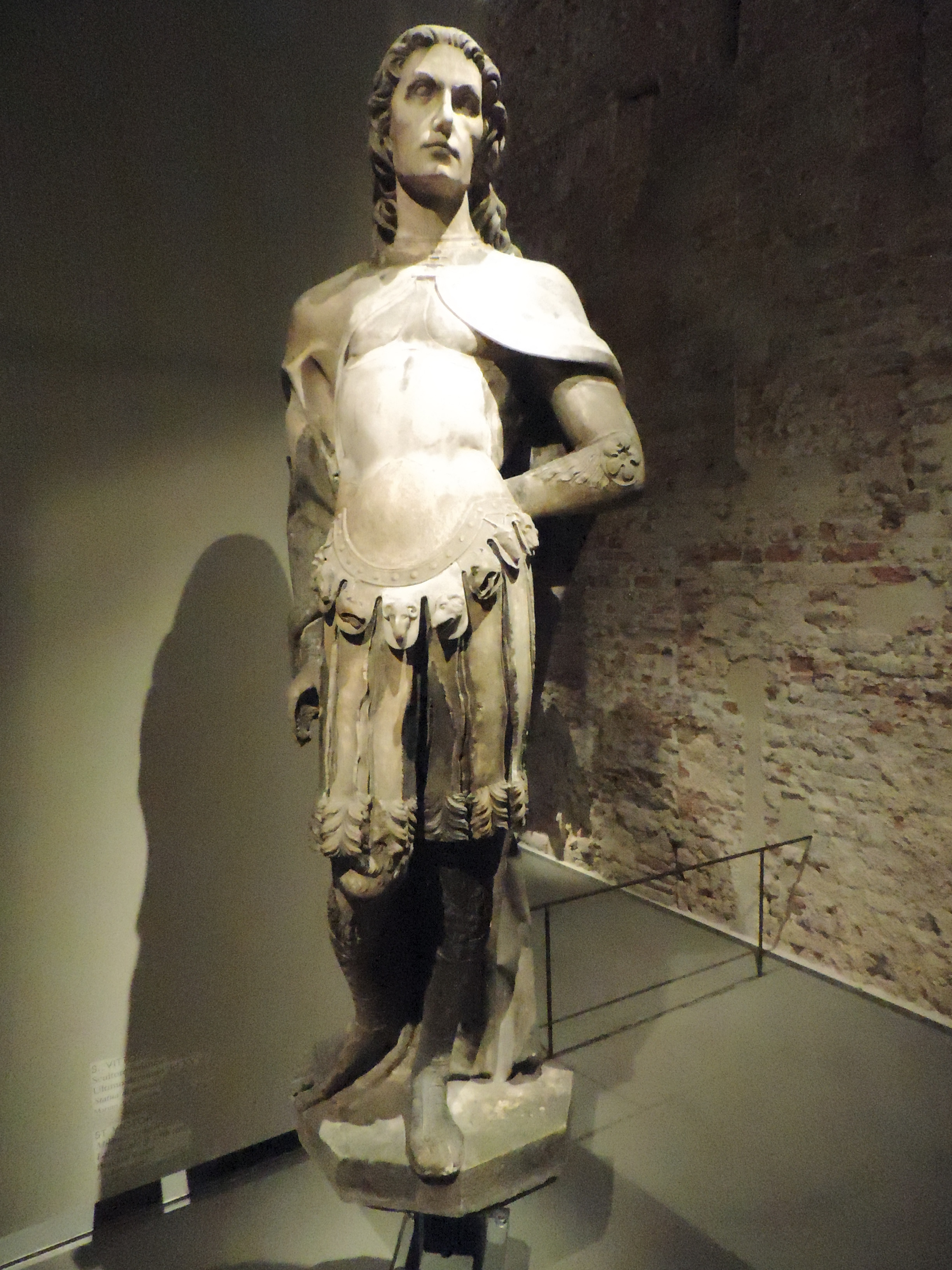
Statue of St Victor in Museo del Duomo, Milan. Unknown Milanese sculptor, last decade of 15th century

His bones were later buried at an ancient basilica on the site of a former Roman mausoleum. They were later moved to the oratory of San Vittore in Ciel d'Oro, originally a free-standing chapel, commissioned by bishop Maternus to hold the relics of Saint Victor. It is now part of the Basilica of Sant'Ambrogio, built by Ambrose, fourth-century bishop of Milan, and initially called the "Basilica Martyrum". Victor's cause was promoted by Ambrose.

Gregory of Tours in his Glory of the Martyrs said that Victor's intercession was effective in freeing captives. In 1576, Bishop Charles Borromeo had the relics returned to the rebuilt San Vittore al Corpo. Forensic examinations conducted in 2018 indicated a male in his mid-twenties, with clear signs of decapitation.

Numerous churches have been dedicated to him in the city itself and throughout the Diocese of Milan and its neighbours.

His memorial day is May 8 in the Eastern Orthodox Church, Roman Catholic Church and the Evangelical Lutheran Church in America.

== Patronage ==
Saint Victor is the patron saint of prisoners and exiles. He is also the patron saint of many different places in Italy, including:

- Agnadello
- Aguzzo, part of Stroncone
- Albavilla
- Arcisate
- Arsago Seprio
- Asigliano Vercellese
- Bottanuco
- Brezzo di Bedero
- Briosco (co-patron)
- Buguggiate
- Caiolo
- Calcio
- Canale
- Cannobio
- Casalzuigno
- Caselle Torinese
- Casorate Primo
- Cavaglietto
- Ceriano Laghetto
- Corbetta
- Esino Lario
- Gaverina Terme
- Mese
- Missaglia
- San Vittore, part of Salsomaggiore Terme
- San Vittore, part of Cesena
- San Vittore del Lazio
- San Vittore Olona
- Sizzano
- Piamborno, part of Piancogno
- Porlezza
- Rho
- Ronago
- Terno d'Isola
- Vallerano
- Varese
- Verbania
- Viadagola, part of Granarolo
- Villa Cortese

Some places in Switzerland also share Saint Victor as their patron saint, specially in the italian-speaking southern part of the country.

- Balerna (Canton of Ticino)
- Muralto (Canton of Ticino)
- San Vittore (Canton of Grisons)
- Poschiavo (Canton of Grisons)
