= Vaprio d'Agogna =

- Comune
- Comune di Vaprio d'Agogna
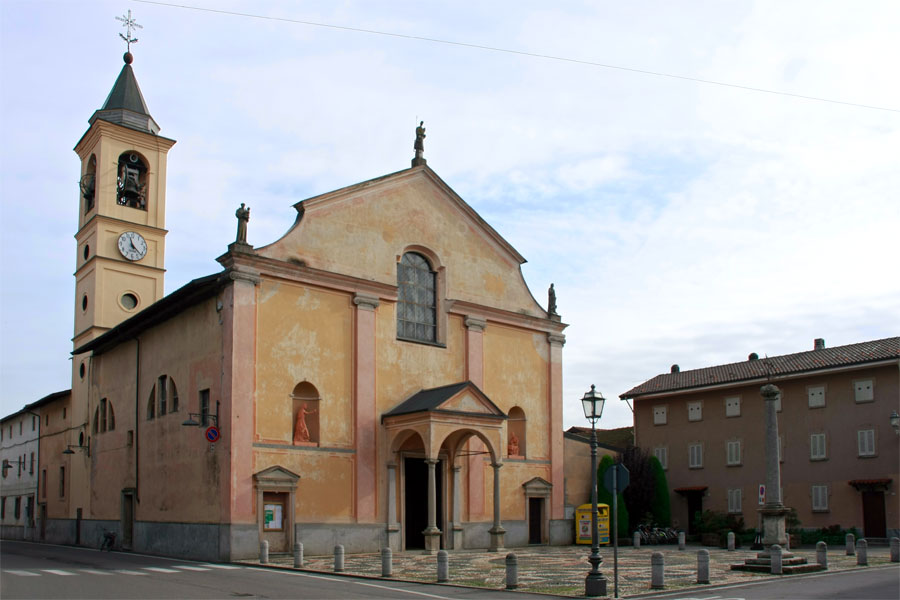
- Church in Vaprio d'Agogna

- Location within Italy Location within Piedmont
- Coordinates: 45°36′N 8°33′E
- Country: Italy
- Region: Piedmont
- Province: Novara (NO)

Government
  - Mayor: Silvano Mellone

Area
  - Total: 10.1 km^{2} (3.9 sq mi)
- Elevation: 232 m (761 ft)

Population (Dec. 2004)
  - Total: 980
  - Density: 97/km^{2} (250/sq mi)
- Demonym: Vapriesi
- Time zone: UTC+1 (CET)
  - Summer (DST): UTC+2 (CEST)
- Postal code: 28010
- Dialing code: 0321
- Website: Official website

Vaprio d'Agogna (Vavru in the Novarese dialect of the Lombard language, Vavron in Piedmontese) is a comune (municipality) in the Province of Novara, in the Italian region of Piedmont, located about 90 kilometres (56 mi) northeast of Turin and about 15 kilometres (9 mi) northwest of Novara.

Vaprio d'Agogna borders the following municipalities: Barengo, Cavaglietto, Mezzomerico, Momo, Oleggio, and Suno.

== History ==
In the area of today's municipality of Vaprio, the first autochthonous people probably settled in pre-Roman times: funerary urns of the Golasecca culture seem to confirm it. The first important expansion occurred in the period between the fourth and second century BC when numerous tribes of Celtic origin, especially belonging to the Vertamocori, arrived in the area.

These people gave rise to the main settlement of Vaprio. The name of the town itself derives from a Gallic term, "Wabero", summarizing the meaning of "narrow valley with a sunken river". The term is common to different Gaulish settlements, such as Vaprio d'Adda, the Belgian Wavre, the French Vabre and others. In fact, as some findings confirm, the primeval settlement was located slightly further east of the current Vaprio (Vavrina locality), in a hilly area centred around the Terdoppio river. The findings confirm the importance of the Celts in the shaping of the village and of the culture of its inhabitants (in the region are spoken variants of the Gallo-italic languages, that had an important contribution by Gauls). Later, however, with the Roman colonization that had slowly decentralized the settlement and due to constant floods of the river, the population moved to the flat and more fertile area where the village is located today. The passage must have been gradual and concluded in the High Middle Ages, as it is remembered by local oral tradition.

The Roman influence is shown by the finding, during the construction of the local castle in the XII-XIV century, of a Roman votive altar dedicated to "Giove Ottimo Massimo", Jupiter; it was preserved intact in the walls of the ancient church that once stood near the castle. The siliceous stone was then donated in 1820 to the cathedral of Novara. Being a decentralized settlement, Vaprio never experienced a large expansion. Its situation during the Lombard Kingdom is unknown, but surrounding villages such as Suno, Barengo and Fara certainly knew a Lombard presence. In medieval times it was assigned to the Committee of Pombia; it then passed under the Counts of Biandrate in 1152, and from that period followed the fate of the larger neighbouring municipality, Momo.

In 1402 the Duke of Milan Gian Galeazzo Visconti handed over the village to the noble Barbavara who then sold it to Cristoforo di Casate. Then, in 1534, Vaprio was sold for 16,800 lire to the lord of Fontaneto d'Agogna, Galeazzo Visconti, remaining under this family until the early nineteenth century. In the Baroque period Vaprio experienced a slight expansion, and a small religious brotherhood was established in the municipality and founded a modest monastery; today, however, nothing remains of it.

In the seventeenth century, the town became a minor possession of the Caccia family, under which some important changes took place in the local castle. They were also the first commissioners to build the new church of Vaprio, which replaced the previous one, smaller and older, which was located within the castle walls. The most famous member of the family, Gian Battista Caccia (called Cacìta by the locals, apparently because of his limited height) is said to have inspired the main antagonist of Alessandro Manzoni's I Promessi Sposi.

In the early nineteenth century, numerous agricultural lands of Vaprio were purchased by two wealthy families, the Bono and the Acerbi. With them, the irrigation system of the surrounding land was expanded, with the creation of new channels. The two families, no longer existing, were historically tied to the aristocracy of Novara and Milan; they are commemorated in the cemetery by two imposing tombs. The Acerbi one, the main sepulcher of the village, is notable for a frescoed ceiling and the marble portraits of the main components, the most important of them being Baldassare Acerbi. Above is the name of the family, Acerbi-Bertone (the latter another still existing family joined to the Acerbi). The Bono family is remembered by a tomb in which Gaudenzio Bono, member of the famous "Mille" expedition of Garibaldi, is buried.

In the mid-nineteenth century, the town experienced a significant population growth: the inhabitants were mainly employed in agriculture, but there were also numerous craftsmen.

Until 1738, the area was considered Lombard and was controlled by the Duchy of Milan: from 1738 until 1863, the village was part of the State of Piedmont and was simply known as Vaprio. After the Italian unification the name was changed in Vaprio d'Agogna through a royal decree issued by King Vittorio Emanuele II, in order to distinguish it from the newly acquired Lombard municipality of Vaprio d'Adda.
