= Agrate =

Agrate may refer to the following places in Italy:

- Agrate Brianza, comune in the Province of Monza and Brianza
- Agrate Conturbia, comune in the Province of Novara
