= Barengo Castle =

Castle in Piedmont, Italy

- Castello di Barengo
- Barengo, Piedmont, Italy
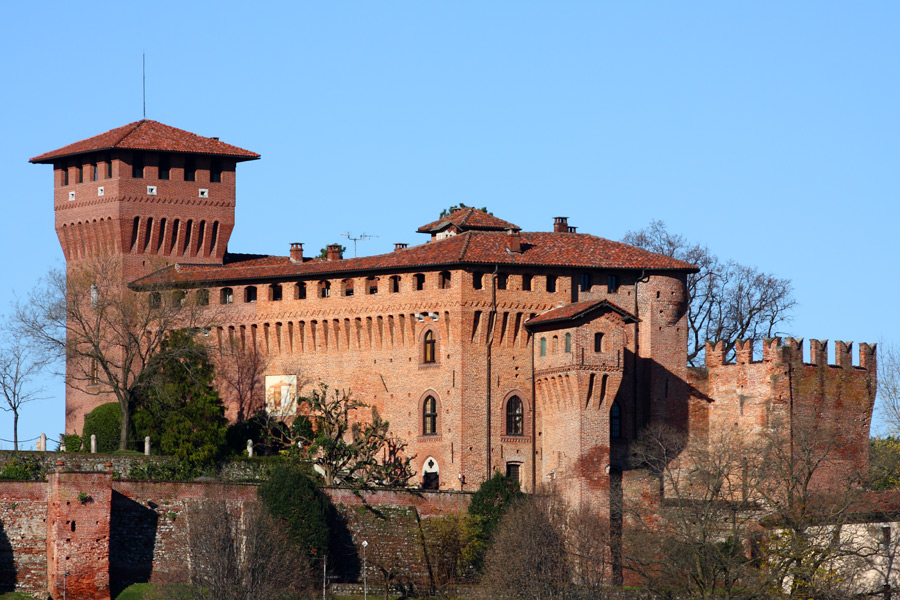
- Barengo Castle in 2010

Site information
- Type: Castle

Location
- Coordinates: 45°34′26.66″N 8°30′35.05″E

Barengo Castle (Italian: Castello di Barengo) is a castle located in Barengo, Piedmont, Italy.

== History ==
The castle stands along the ancient road that once connected the Via Francigena to the fords of the Sesia River. Its exact date of foundation is unknown, though the first documentary evidence of a castrum dates back to the 14th century, when the settlement of Barengo was moved closer to the fortified walls for protection. These fortifications withstood the fire and plundering of 1358, which followed the clashes between the forces of Galeazzo II Visconti and those of Marquis Giovanni of Monferrato. After 1480, Melchiorre Tornielli completed the construction of the fortress, which, together with the one in Briona, represented a remarkable example of 15th-century military architecture.

In the following centuries, the castle passed to the Ferrari family and, in 1803, to the Botta family, by which time it had fallen into severe decay. In 1849 it became the property of the Mazza family, whose restoration works significantly altered the original layout. After World War I, Count Gaudenzio Tornielli di Borgolavezzaro commissioned architect Nigra to rebuild the complex in a Neo-Medieval style. Later restoration and renovation works were undertaken by the Boroli family, the most recent owners.

== Description ==
Built almost entirely in brick, the castle features an irregular trapezoidal plan with a central courtyard. It originally had two corner towers on the western side, now lost, the larger of which stood at the southwest corner. The main entrance, located to the northeast, was reached via a drawbridge. Original elements still preserved include part of the projecting cylindrical turret at the northeast corner and a section of crenellated wall.

== Gallery ==
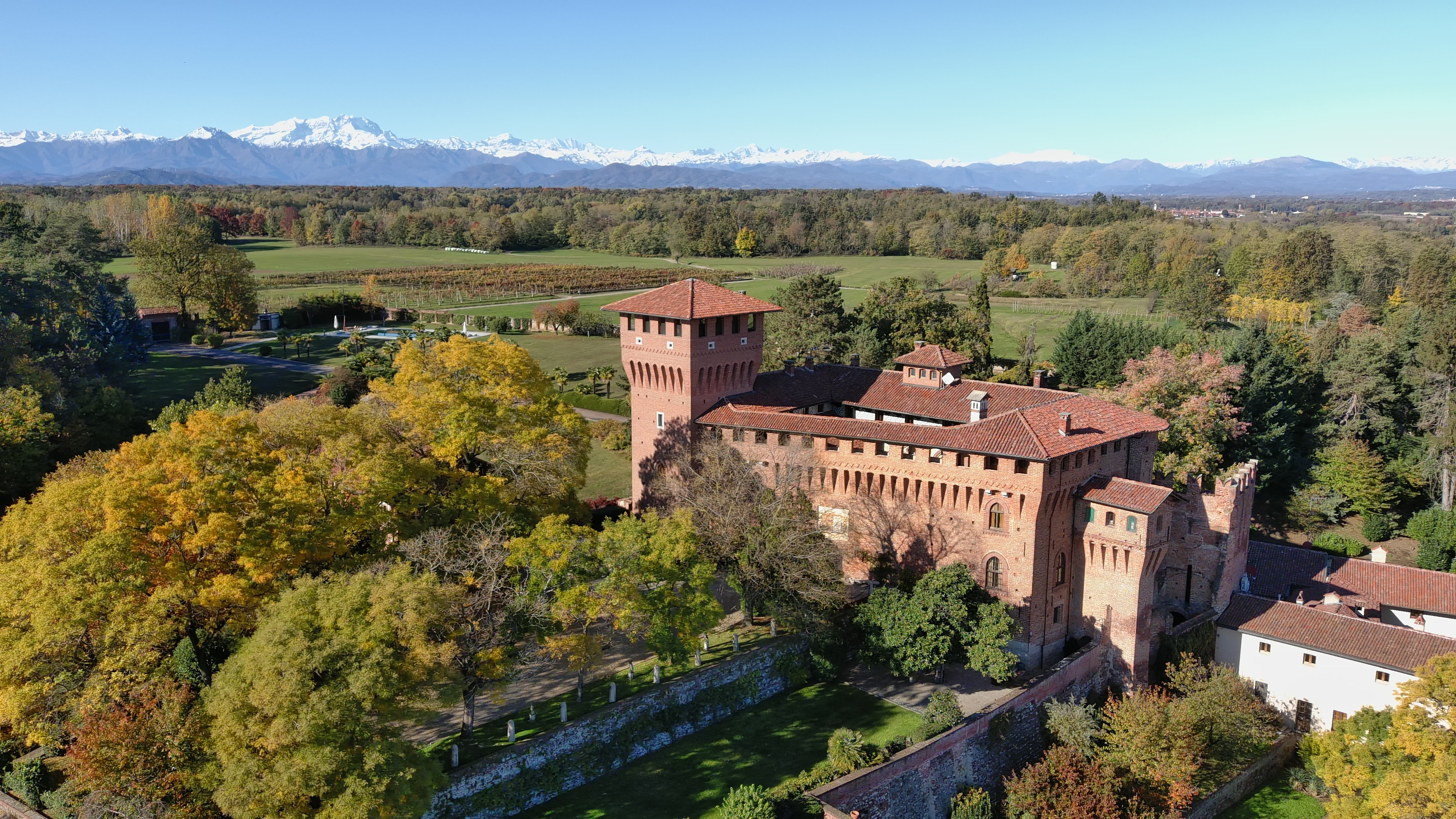

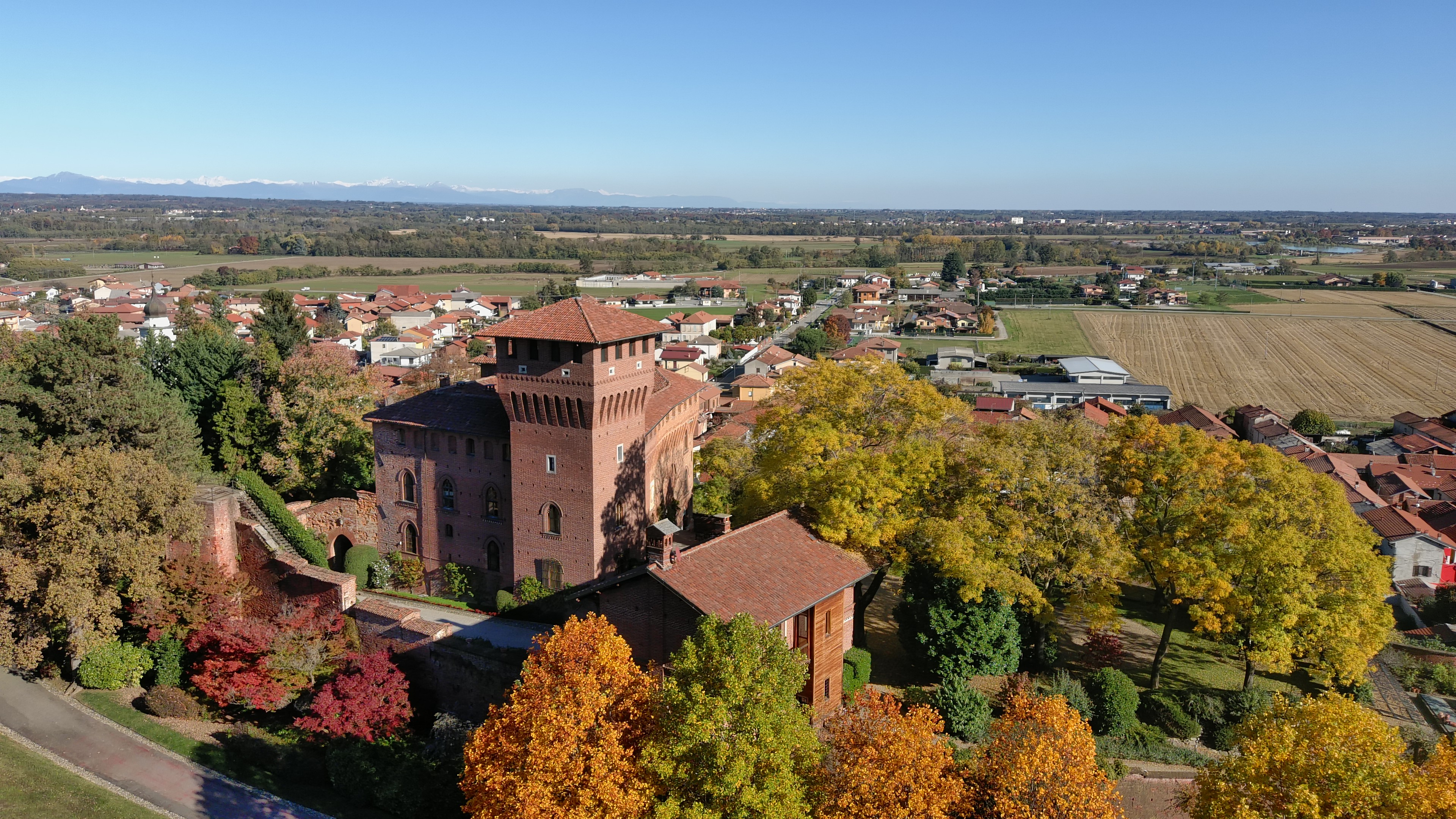

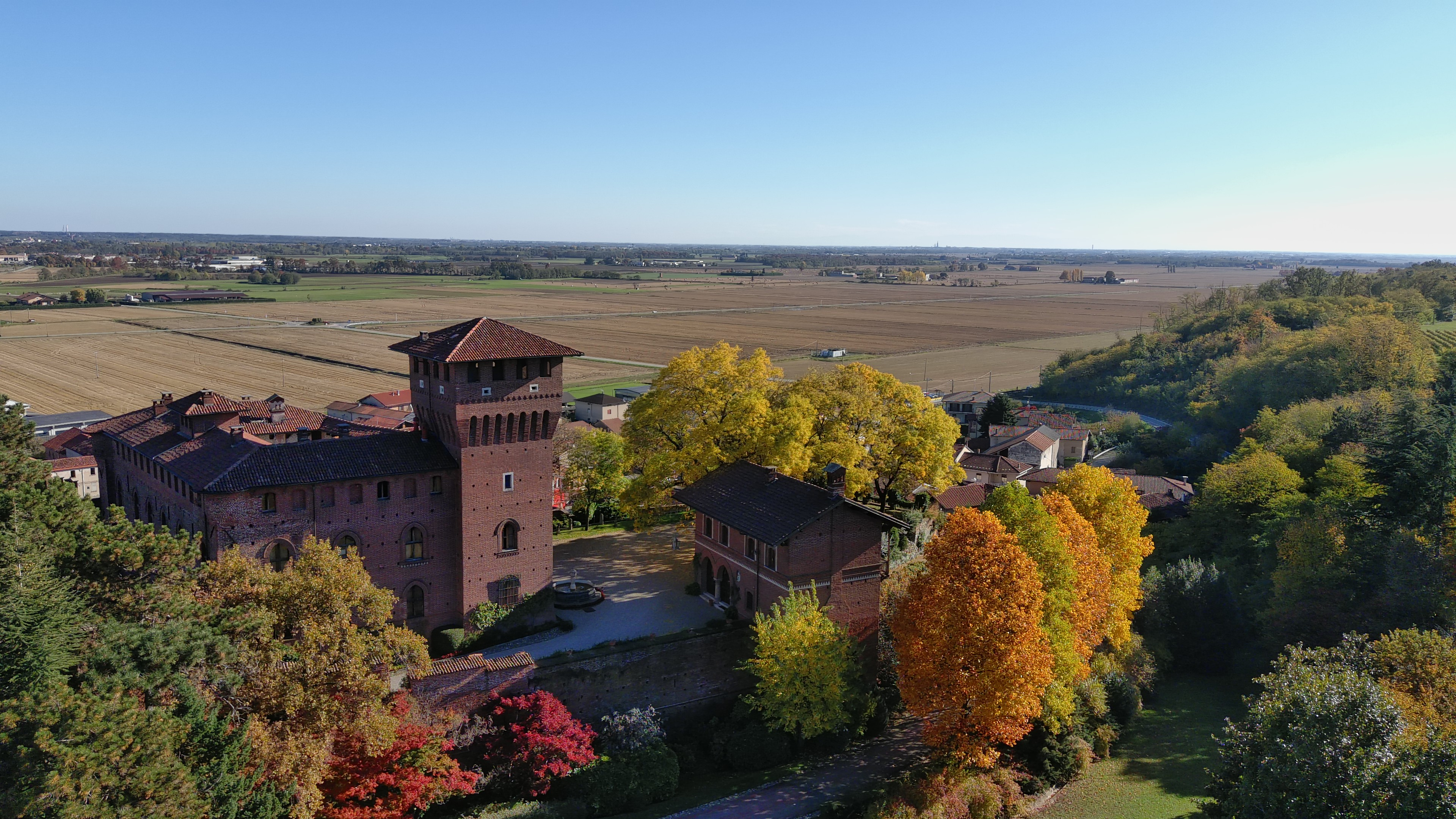
