= Bogogno =

- Comune
- Comune di Bogogno
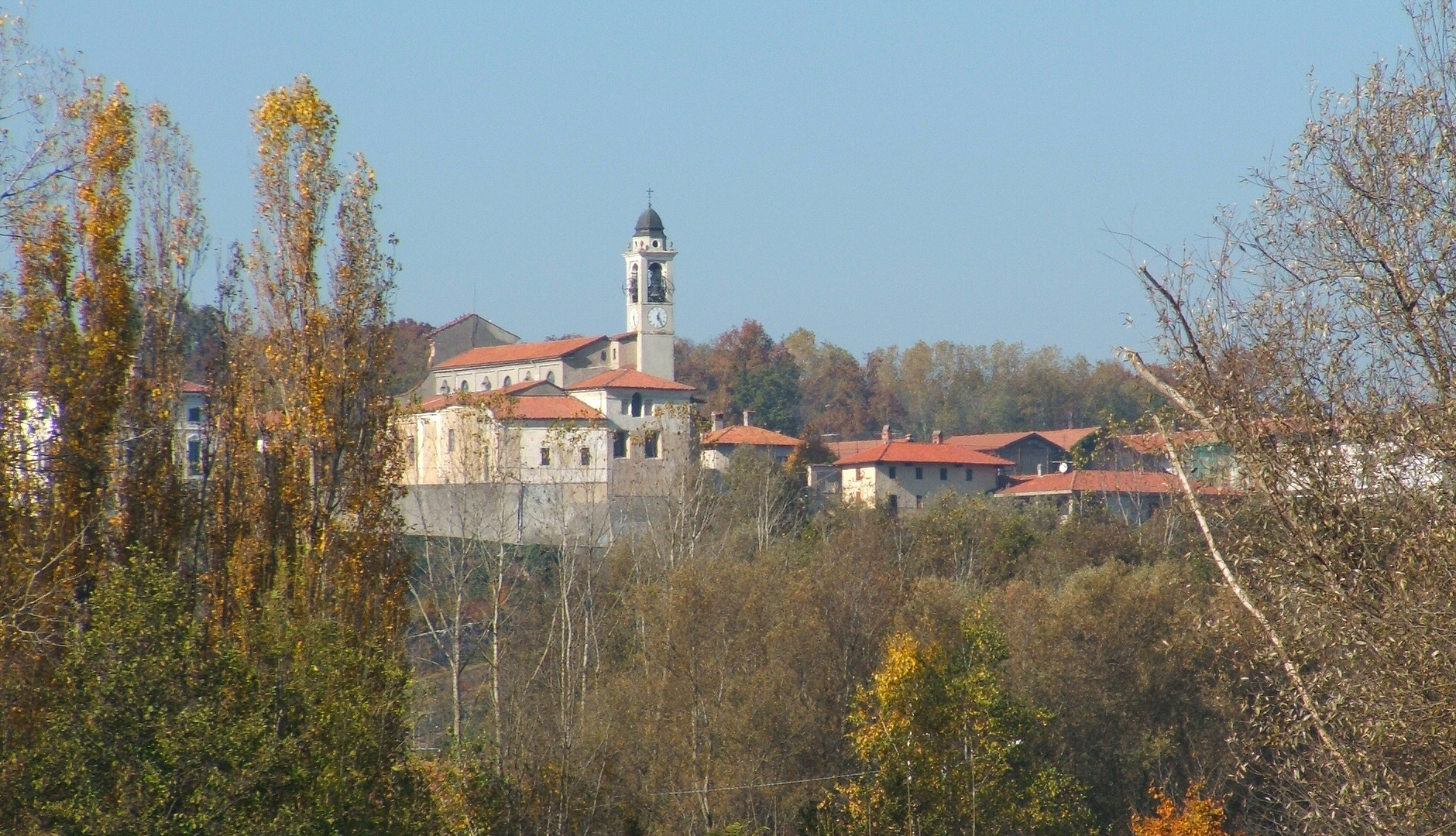
- View of Bogogno

- Coat of arms

- Location within Italy Location within Piedmont
- Coordinates: 45°40′N 8°32′E
- Country: Italy
- Region: Piedmont
- Province: Novara (NO)
- Frazioni: Arbora, Montecchio

Government
  - Mayor: Andrea Guglielmetti

Area
  - Total: 8.4 km^{2} (3.2 sq mi)
- Elevation: 278 m (912 ft)

Population (Dec. 2004)
  - Total: 1,221
  - Density: 150/km^{2} (380/sq mi)
- Demonym: Bogonesi
- Time zone: UTC+1 (CET)
  - Summer (DST): UTC+2 (CEST)
- Postal code: 28010
- Dialing code: 0322
- Website: Official website

Bogogno (Piedmontese: Boeugn, Lombard: Buögn) is a comune (municipality) in the Province of Novara in the Italian region of Piedmont, located about 90 kilometres (56 mi) northeast of Turin and about 25 kilometres (16 mi) northwest of Novara.

Bogogno borders the following municipalities: Agrate Conturbia, Borgomanero, Cressa, Gattico-Veruno and Suno.
