= San Leonardo, Borgomanero =

Church in Borgomanero, Italy

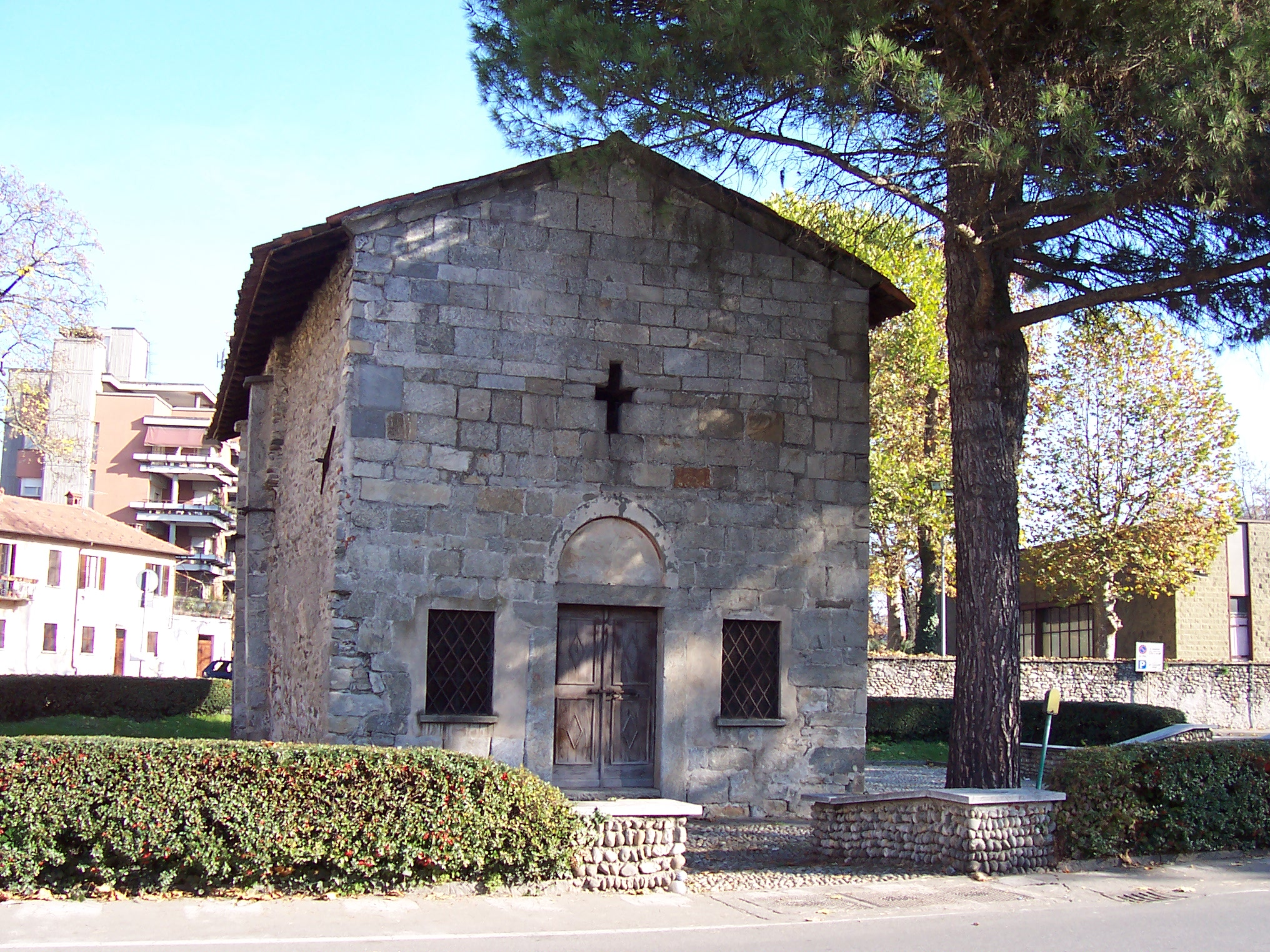
San Leonardo in Borgomanero

San Leonardo is a Romanesque-style Roman Catholic church in the town of Borgomanero, province of Novara, Piedmont, Italy.

== History ==
A church at the site was built between 1125 and 1150 under the patronage of the Marquis of Pombia. That church served as the first parish church and housed an adjacent hostel for pilgrims. The stone church underwent various refurbishments, and the interior was restored in the 1980s, restoring the interior closer to the original Romanesque appearance and removing additions over the centuries. It is open on Saturdays to visitors.

The apse was frescoed in the 13th century by an unknown painter from the workshop of the Master of Angera. Traces remain of frescoes depicting Christ Pantocrator with the symbols of the Evangelists, the twelve Apostles, the months of the year, a series of saints, and a Last Supper with Judas' Betrayal. Another fresco depicts the Martyrdom of St. Bartholomew in the second bay on the left.

In the fifteenth century, further frescoes were added by the Master of Borgomanero, depicting a Madonna and Child, a Trinity, a Madonna del Latte, a Madonna with Saints Peter and Paul, and a Nativity. Finally, the church also has a 16th-century fresco, also by an anonymous painter, depicting the Madonna of the Sette Dolori.

== Architecture ==
The oratory, which is the only remaining building of the primitive village of San Leonardo, is a prime example of the architectural style called "Romanesque" which prevailed in northern Italy in the period from the end of the first millennium until the XIII century, that is, after the Byzantine style and before the advent of the Gothic and the Renaissance: a sober, essential and massive style.

The plan of the church is simple, but the coverage of the nave with a cross vault shows the importance of San Leonardo in a village that was acquiring greater political and economic importance in the period in which the church was built. The church also had a strategic position at the crossroads between "Via Francisca" (the road that from Novara leads to the Sempione pass and France) and the one that from Turin and Vercelli leads to Lake Maggiore and from there to Switzerland and Germany.

The oratory has a single nave of about 12x7m, divided into three rectangular bays and covered by a cross vault whose ashlars are still preserved inside and the buttresses outside. It has a semicircular apse to the east, with two doubled-splayed windows. The façade is gabled, in square blocks of stone, with a door surmounted by a lunette and a small cross-shaped window. The roof was of stone, of which a trace still exists in the apse area. The side walls are made of small pebbles arranged irregularly and only in small fish-spike sections.
