= Collegiata di San Bartolomeo, Borgomanero =

Roman Catholic in Borgomanero, Piedmont, Italy

Coordinates: 45°41′56.4″N 8°27′45.3″E

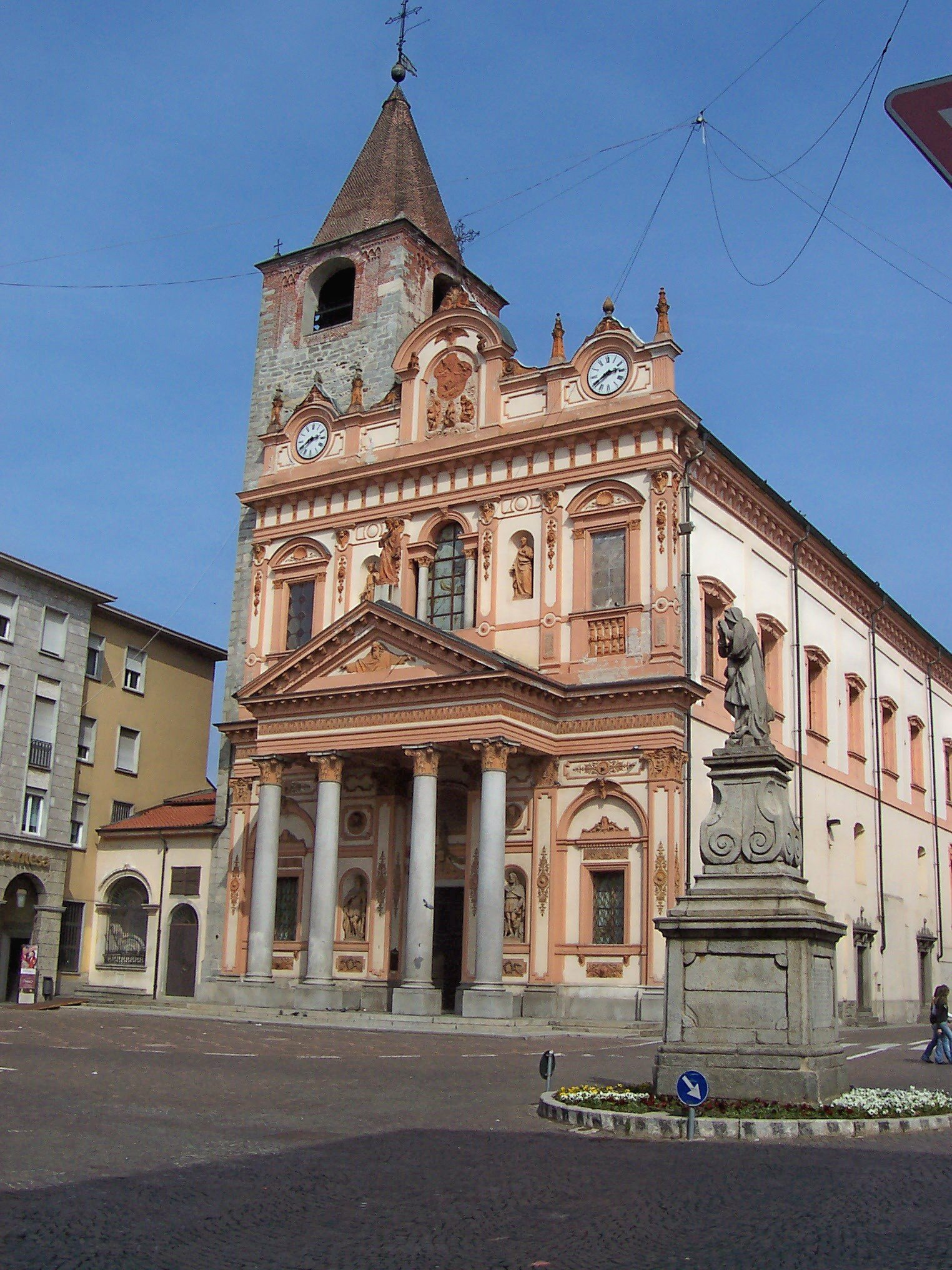
The facade of the church

The Collegiata di San Bartolomeo is the main Roman Catholic parish church on Corso Garibaldi and SP142 in the centre of the town of Borgomanero, province of Novara, Piedmont, Italy.

== History ==
A church at the site is documented since 1225, and dedicated to St Bartholemew. It has undergone many reconstructions including a major refurbishment in 1680 leading to the present Baroque structure. The church was made a collegiate church, governed by a provost, by Pope Innocent XI in 1681.

The colourful red and white facade is heavily decorated with sculptural and architectural elements. It has a triangular portico held up by four tall corinthian columns.

The interior is decorated with frescoes and canvases (1611–1619) by il Morazzone. The main wooden altar was created in the 17th century by Antonio Pini.

It also houses a triptych altarpiece (1556) completed by Giovanni Rapa, Gerolamo Varolto or Varoli, and Lodovico Canta. The central panel shows the Virgin and Child offering St Bartholemew an Apple with an angel with flanked by panels with St Andrew and the Cross and St John the Baptist. At the top of the altarpiece is a Pietà with three figures and below are panels with episodes in the life of Saint Bartholemew, Cristoforo, Roch, Sebastian, and Eustachius. The work was installed as the main altarpiece in 1596. It was restored in 2008.

In the Piazza Martiri della Libertà in front of the church is a statue of the Immaculate Conception, erected in the 18th century under the patronage of the Marquis Don Gabriele I degli Este.
