= Borgomanero =

Borgomanero Borbanee (Lombard)
- Comune
- Comune di Borgomanero
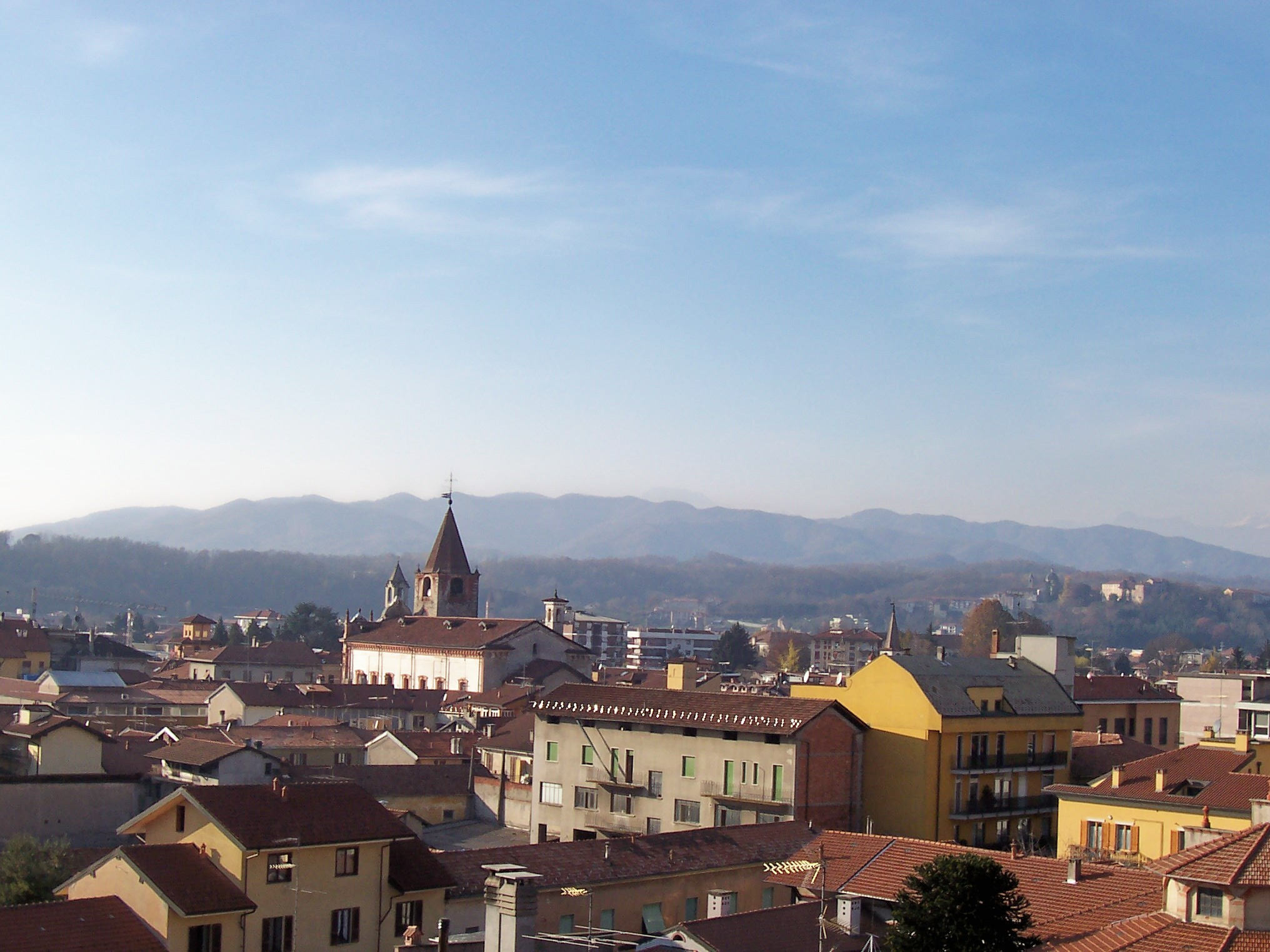
- View of Borgomanero

- Coat of arms

- Location within Italy Location within Piedmont
- Coordinates: 45°42′N 8°28′E
- Country: Italy
- Region: Piedmont
- Province: Novara (NO)
- Frazioni: San Marco, Santa Cristina, Vergano, Cascina Fagnani, Cascina Fontana, Cascina Vallazza, Cascina Vallazzetta, Cascina Vigane, Piovino

Government
  - Mayor: Sergio Bossi

Area
  - Total: 32.27 km^{2} (12.46 sq mi)
- Elevation: 306 m (1,004 ft)

Population (1-1-2017)
  - Total: 21,776
  - Density: 674.8/km^{2} (1,748/sq mi)
- Demonym: Borgomanerese(i)
- Time zone: UTC+1 (CET)
  - Summer (DST): UTC+2 (CEST)
- Postal code: 28021
- Dialing code: 0322
- Website: Official website

Borgomanero (Piedmontese: Borbané; Lombard: Borbanee) is a comune (municipality) in the Province of Novara in the Italian region Piedmont, located about 110 kilometres (68 mi) northeast of Turin, about 30 kilometres (19 mi) northwest of Novara and about 60 km (37 mi) northwest of Milan.

Borgomanero borders the following municipalities: Bogogno, Briga Novarese, Cressa, Cureggio, Fontaneto d'Agogna, Gargallo, Gattico-Veruno, Gozzano, Invorio, Maggiora.

Borgomanero has a railway station, served by the Santhià–Arona railway and the Novara-Domodossola railway.

== History ==
Legend has it that a group of thirteen people, called the Thirteen Orcs (Trözz 'Orchi in dialect form), returning from a pilgrimage to the shrine on the nearby island of San Giulio (Lake Orta), founded the first nucleus of the city, on the banks of the Agogna. The same legend also tells the origin of Tapulon, the local traditional dish, created with the poor ingredients that the group had at its disposal: the meat of the only donkey who carried their luggage, wine and little else.

The first historical name of Borgomanero is Burgus Sancti Leonardi (i.e. Hamlet of Saint Leonard). This name derives from Saint Leonard's church, the most ancient monument in town, presumably dating back to 1125–1150.

From the "Paper of Romagnano" of 1198, we learn that Burgus Sancti Leonardi already enjoyed the status of a free village at the time.

The toponym Borgomanero is attributed to Jacob Mainerio (Jacobus de Mayneriis), who was mayor of Novara between 1193 and 1194. Mainerio decided to transform Burgus sancti Leonardi into a military stronghold between the Sesia river and Ticino river, and gave his name to the new military camp (Burgus Maynerium), replacing that of Burgus sancti Leonardi. The construction of the new walled village almost certainly implied dismantling the previous hamlet dedicated to Saint Leonard, and the old church remained outside the walls, perhaps as a cemetery church. The new village was redesigned on the model of the Roman civitas, with two main streets crossing each other at the centre, and side streets creating a regular network of intersections: a pattern that still characterises the historic city centre.

The village continued to grow in importance and resisted several sieges in the war between Visconti and Paleologi in the 1300s. Borgomanero lost autonomy when the Dukes of Milan granted it in fief first to the Tornielli family (1412–1447) and later to the Trivulzio family (1466–1548).

In 1449, Borgomanero and its surroundings were the locations of the clash between Louis, Duke of Savoy and Francesco I Sforza, which culminated in the Battle of Borgomanero, won by the Lombard troops led by Bartolomeo Colleoni.

Later Borgomanero became a fief of the House of Este for over two hundred years (1552–1757). Borgomanero was not touched by the plague of the mid-seventeenth century that raged in Europe, because only the four plague victims were expelled from the city and the order was given to close the gates and to isolate the city until the epidemic had died out. This decision (remarkable for the ignorance at the time on infections) saved the town from the plague.

During the early nineteenth century, Borgomanero lost its last walls and it became a commercially and economically more modern centre.

Borgomanero took an active part in the Italian Risorgimento: the brothers Ercole and Antonio Maioni paid with exile raising the Italian flag in Turin in 1821; Maddalena Zoppis lost an eye during the Five Days of Milan in 1848; Costantino Pagani was one of the volunteers participating in the Expedition of the Thousand led by Giuseppe Garibaldi. Moreover, the city was occupied by the Austrian army in the aftermath of the Battle of Novara (1849).

Twentieth-century figures of note include Mora and Gibin, gold medals of the Italian resistance movement, and Achille Marazza, member of the National High Liberation Committee of Italy, who in 1967 donated the villa and library to the town, now home to the foundation that bears his name.

== Main sights ==
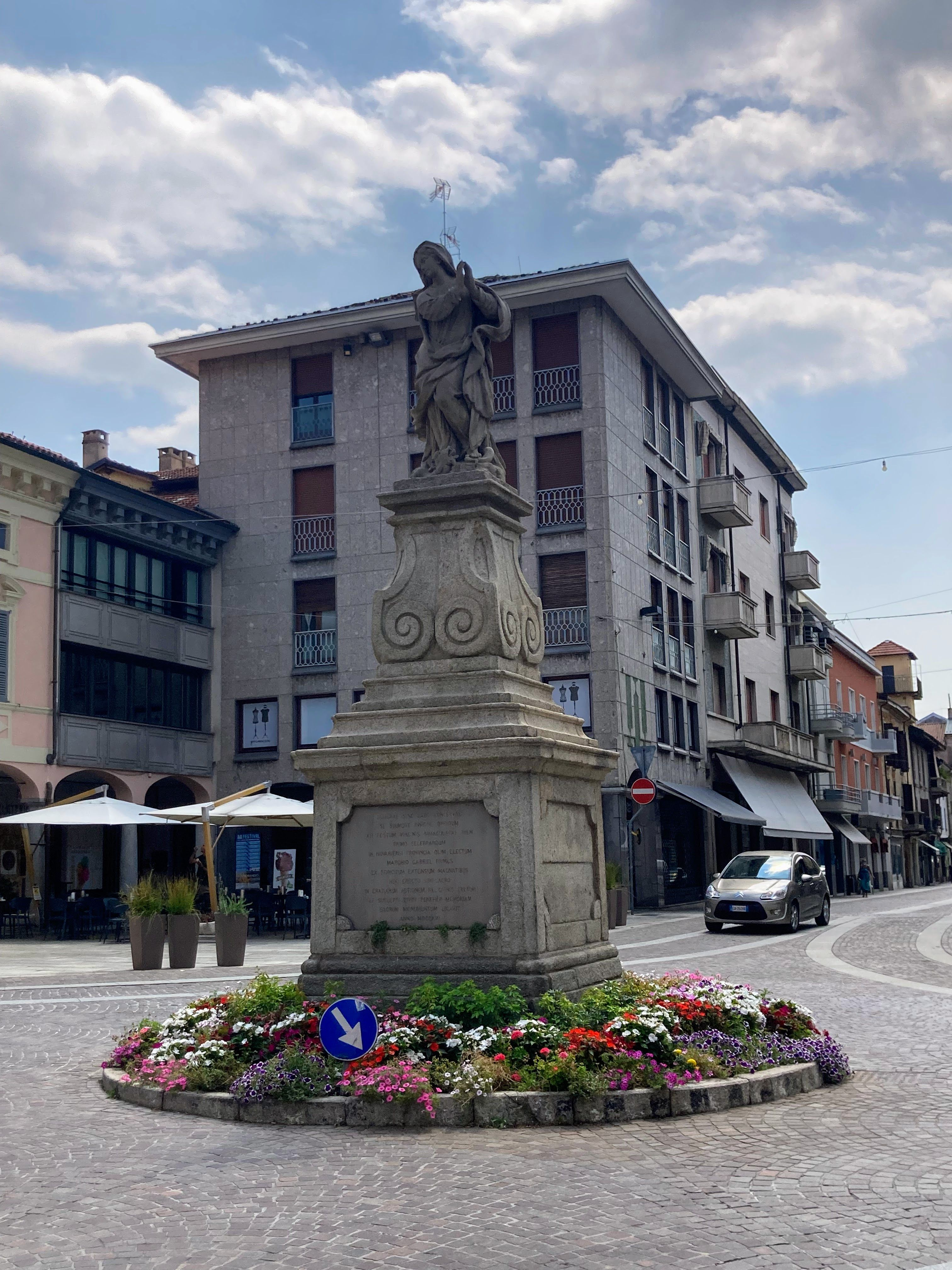
Piazza Martiri

Among the churches in the town are:

- Collegiata di San Bartolomeo, main parish church of the town
- San Leonardo, former parish church, originally built between 1125 and 1150
- Oratory of Santa Caterina
- Santa Trinità
- San Nicola di Baraggiola

== Climate ==
Climate data for Borgomanero (1991–2020)
Month	Jan	Feb	Mar	Apr	May	Jun	Jul	Aug	Sep	Oct	Nov	Dec	Year
Mean daily maximum °C (°F)	7.8 (46.0)	9.8 (49.6)	14.2 (57.6)	17.5 (63.5)	22.0 (71.6)	26.0 (78.8)	28.5 (83.3)	27.7 (81.9)	23.1 (73.6)	17.3 (63.1)	11.7 (53.1)	8.0 (46.4)	17.8 (64.0)
Daily mean °C (°F)	3.0 (37.4)	4.3 (39.7)	8.4 (47.1)	11.9 (53.4)	16.3 (61.3)	20.2 (68.4)	22.5 (72.5)	22.0 (71.6)	17.7 (63.9)	12.7 (54.9)	7.4 (45.3)	3.4 (38.1)	12.5 (54.5)
Mean daily minimum °C (°F)	−1.8 (28.8)	−1.2 (29.8)	2.7 (36.9)	6.4 (43.5)	10.5 (50.9)	14.4 (57.9)	16.5 (61.7)	16.3 (61.3)	12.4 (54.3)	8.2 (46.8)	3.0 (37.4)	−1.1 (30.0)	7.2 (44.9)
Average precipitation mm (inches)	53.7 (2.11)	57.0 (2.24)	77.0 (3.03)	126.7 (4.99)	160.8 (6.33)	121.4 (4.78)	88.7 (3.49)	123.9 (4.88)	125.7 (4.95)	139.3 (5.48)	173.4 (6.83)	74.7 (2.94)	1,322.3 (52.05)
Average precipitation days (≥ 1.0 mm)	5.0	4.4	5.6	9.6	10.9	8.9	6.8	8.2	7.7	8.4	8.3	5.0	88.8
Source: Istituto Superiore per la Protezione e la Ricerca Ambientale

== Twin towns ==
- Digne-les-Bains, France
- Bad Mergentheim, Germany
