= Santa Trinità, Borgomanero =

Church building in Borgomanero, Italy

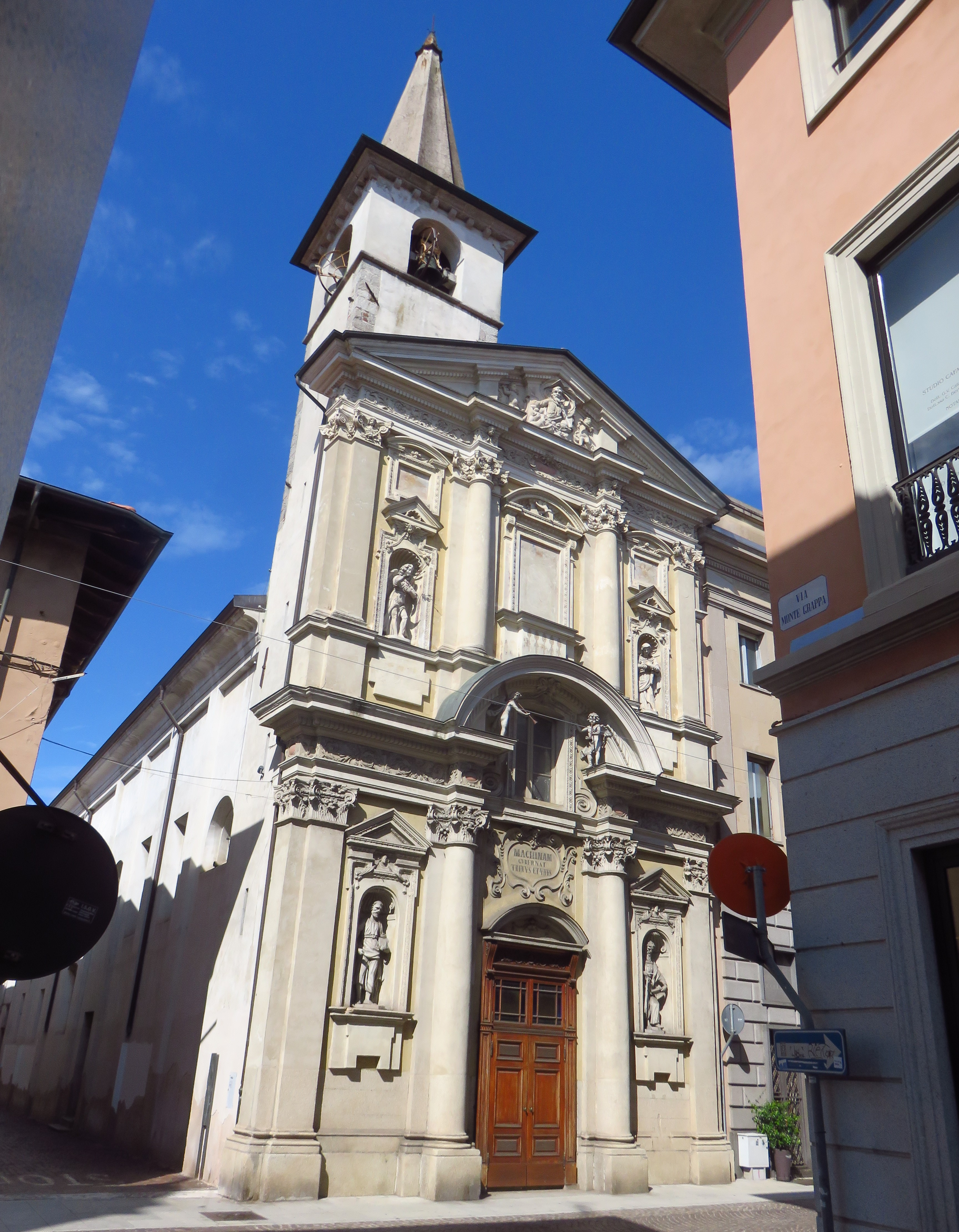
Borgomanero Chiesa della Santissima Trinità.jpg

Santa Trinità is a Roman Catholic oratory in the town limits of Borgomanero, province of Novara, Piedmont, Italy.

== History ==
Construction of the oratory began in 1587 with the patronage of Giuseppe Majone, a knight of St Peter, and his brother Francesco, along with the construction of an adjacent hospice for the sick. The brothers Majone had originated in the town, but had achieved a large fortune in Rome working over 30 years as salumieri (butchers).

The oratory was consecrated in 1590 by Cardinal Cesare Speciano. The bell tower was added in 1613. The oratory underwent restructuring in 1680 and in 1770. The facade was added in 1780. It houses the main altarpiece depicting the Trinity by Benedetto Créspi. In 1877, the relics of Santa Anatolia were putatively transferred here from the Oratory of St Anthony.
