= Marano Ticino =

- Comune
- Comune di Marano Ticino
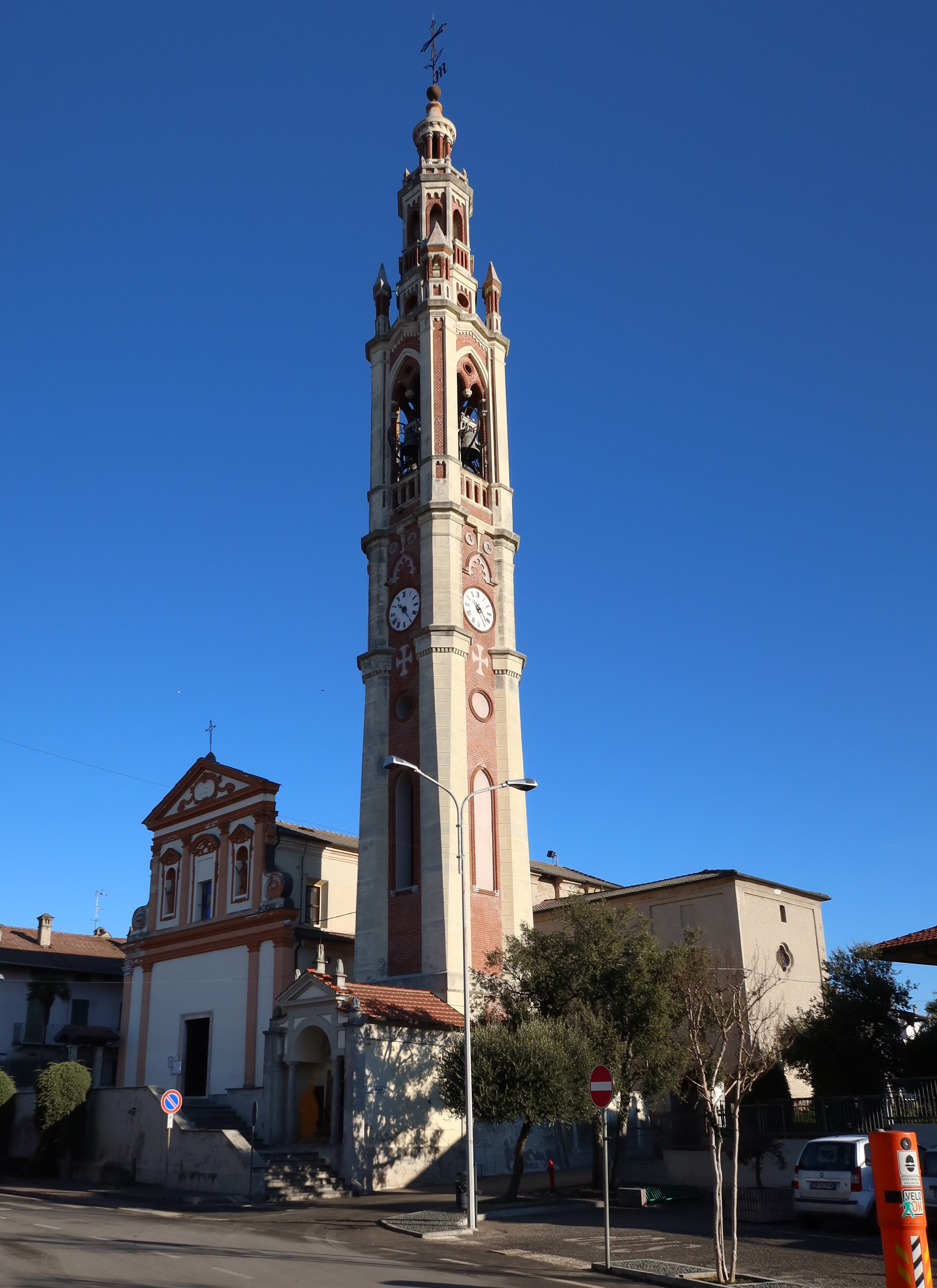
- Church in Marano Ticino

- Location within Italy Location within Piedmont
- Coordinates: 45°38′N 8°38′E
- Country: Italy
- Region: Piedmont
- Province: Novara (NO)

Government
  - Mayor: Davinio Zanetti

Area
  - Total: 7.79 km^{2} (3.01 sq mi)
- Elevation: 258 m (846 ft)

Population (Dec. 2004)
  - Total: 1,524
  - Density: 196/km^{2} (507/sq mi)
- Demonym: Maranesi
- Time zone: UTC+1 (CET)
  - Summer (DST): UTC+2 (CEST)
- Postal code: 28040
- Dialing code: 0321
- Website: Official website

Marano Ticino is a comune (municipality) in the Province of Novara in the Italian region Piedmont, located about 100 kilometres (62 mi) northeast of Turin and about 20 kilometres (12 mi) north of Novara.

Marano Ticino borders the following municipalities: Divignano, Mezzomerico, Oleggio, Pombia, and Vizzola Ticino.
