= Suno, Piedmont =

Suno
- Comune
- Comune di Suno
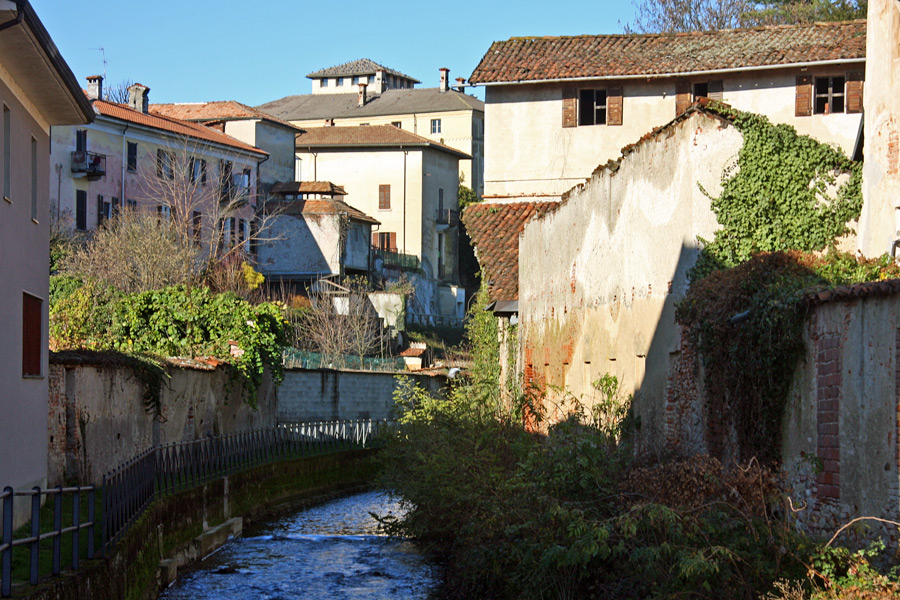
- View of Suno

- Location within Italy Location within Piedmont
- Coordinates: 45°38′N 8°32′E
- Country: Italy
- Region: Piedmont
- Province: Novara (NO)
- Frazioni: Baraggia, Mottoscarone, Piana, Pieve

Government
  - Mayor: Riccardo Giuliani

Area
  - Total: 21.3 km^{2} (8.2 sq mi)
- Elevation: 250 m (820 ft)

Population (Dec. 2004)
  - Total: 2,802
  - Density: 132/km^{2} (341/sq mi)
- Demonym: Sunesi
- Time zone: UTC+1 (CET)
  - Summer (DST): UTC+2 (CEST)
- Postal code: 28019
- Dialing code: 0322
- Website: Official website

Suno is a comune (municipality) in the Province of Novara in the Italian region Piedmont, located about 90 kilometres (56 mi) northeast of Turin and about 20 kilometres (12 mi) northwest of Novara.

Suno borders the following municipalities: Agrate Conturbia, Bogogno, Cavaglietto, Cressa, Fontaneto d'Agogna, Mezzomerico, and Vaprio d'Agogna.

== History ==
Suno was a Roman Colonia. It was also called Xuno or Xunum and its territory, mostly characterised by hills, allowed inhabitants to exploit resources. It included different hamlets in which finds have been made. After the fall of the Roman Empire, Suno was occupied by Lombards, who found a city almost destroyed and abandoned. Around 900 a.C. Suno's wealth was represented by various monuments and churches, some of which are still visible today. Starting from the plague epidemic of 1521-1630, economic problems arose and the country remained undeveloped industrially. This leads its economy to be based mainly on agriculture and livestock. Indeed, Suno is known as "The city of wine" and it's specialised in cattle breeding.

== Monuments and Architecture ==
- Castle of Suno.
- Parish church of San Genesio.
- War Memorial.
