= San Michele, Oleggio =

Church building in Oleggio, Italy

San Michele is a Romanesque, Roman Catholic church located on Via Mezzomerico #10 in the town limits of Oleggio, province of Novara, Piedmont, Italy.

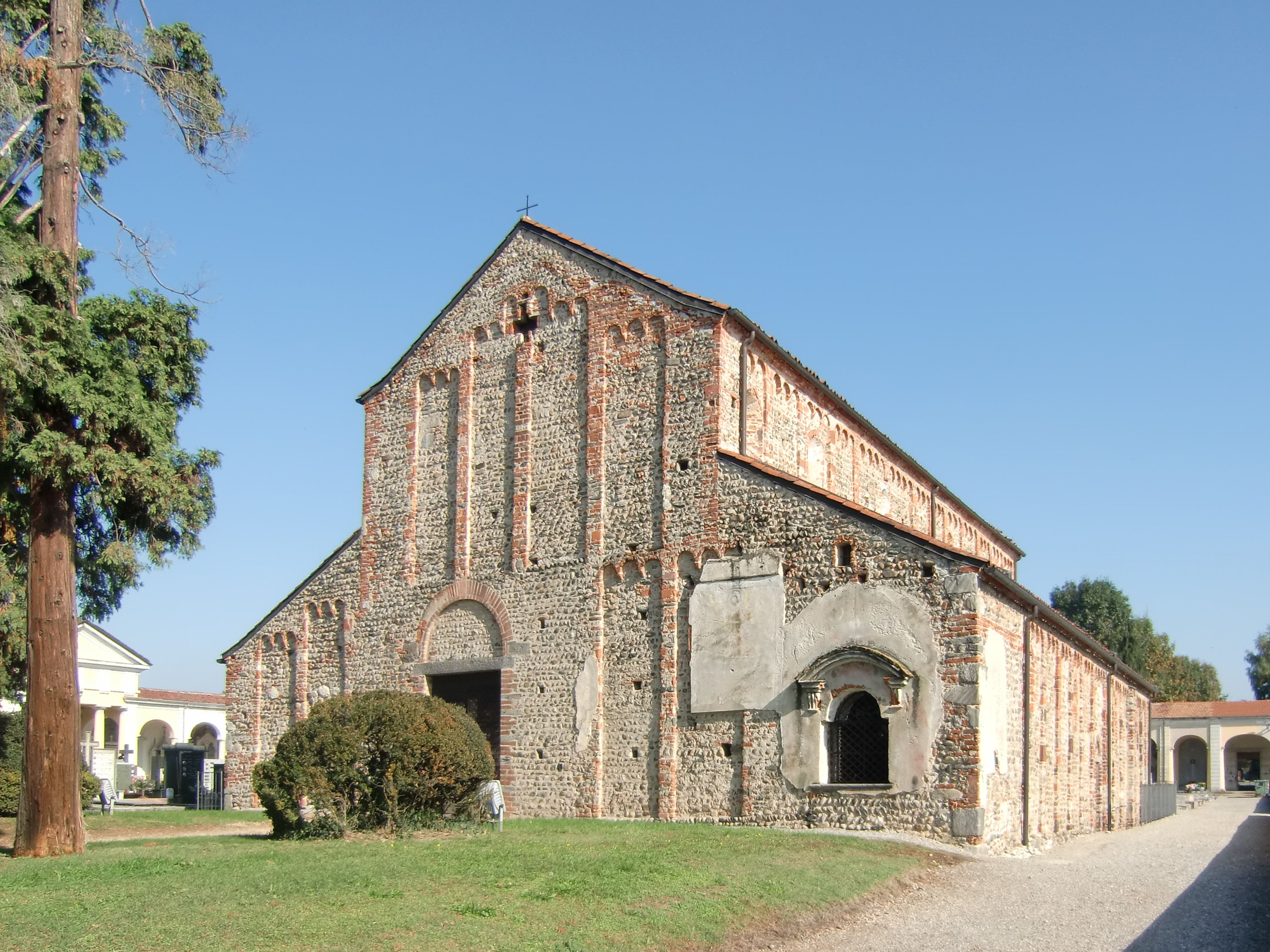
Facade of San Michele

== History ==
The stone basilica structure was likely erected in the 10th to 11th centuries. Documents sent in 1133 from Pope Innocent II to the Bishop of Novara mention the church. When the parish church in Oleggio was built in the 15th century, this rural church suffered a decline of importance, becoming a cemetery chapel.

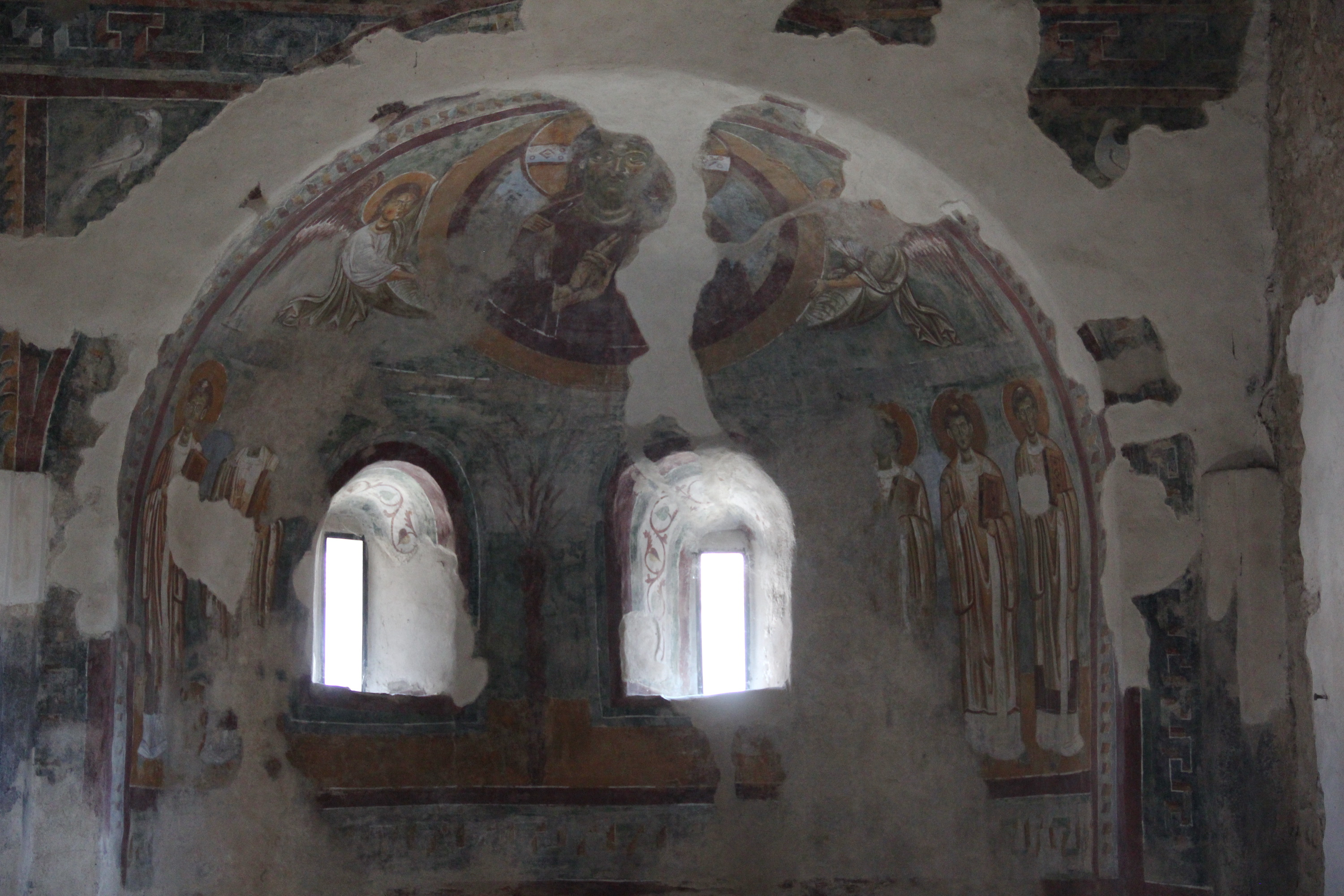
Apse frescoes

Below the presbytery is an underground crypt. There are three apses with a cornice of false arches and mullioned windows. The three naves are divided by rectangular pilasters.

The interior has early medieval frescoes discovered first in 1897. Over the next century, a restoration brought to light more frescoes. The apse has a fresco depicting Christ in Majesty inside a mandorla, above six deacons. Below this register is the scene of 10 armed knights and a mother and child are depicted. Other Romanesque frescoes are visible on the ceiling. The counter-facade depicts the Last Judgement and three patriarchs painted circa 1060 circa.
