= Agrate Conturbia =

- Comune
- Comune di Agrate Conturbia
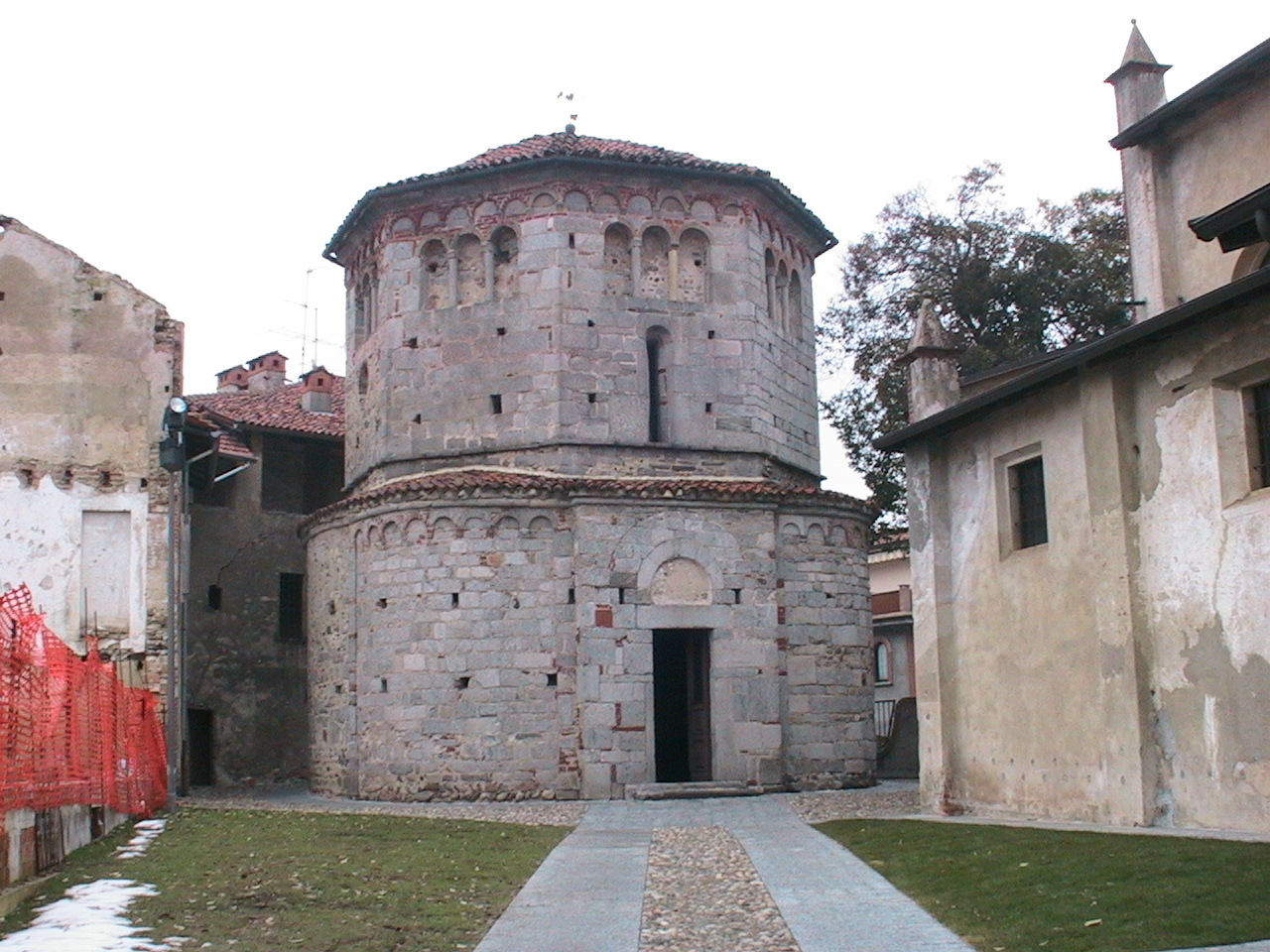
- The Romanesque baptistry

- Location within Italy Location within Piedmont
- Coordinates: 45°40′35″N 8°33′08″E
- Country: Italy
- Region: Piedmont
- Province: Novara (NO)
- Frazioni: Agrate, Conturbia

Government
  - Mayor: Simone Tosi

Area
  - Total: 14.51 km^{2} (5.60 sq mi)
- Elevation: 337 m (1,106 ft)

Population (2017)
  - Total: 1,544
  - Density: 106.4/km^{2} (275.6/sq mi)
- Demonyms: Agratesi, Conturbiesi
- Time zone: UTC+1 (CET)
  - Summer (DST): UTC+2 (CEST)
- Postal code: 28010
- Dialing code: 0322
- Website: Official website

Agrate Conturbia (Piedmontese: Agrà e Contòrbia, Lombard: Agraa e Contorbia) is a comune (municipality) in the Province of Novara, in the Italian region of Piedmont, located about 100 kilometres (62 mi) northeast of Turin and about 25 kilometres (16 mi) north of Novara. It consists of two towns, Agrate and Conturbia, located in the low hills between Cressa and Borgo Ticino, south of Lake Maggiore.

Agrate Conturbia borders the following municipalities: Bogogno, Borgo Ticino, Divignano, Gattico-Veruno, Mezzomerico and Suno.

== Main sights ==
- Castle of Agrate, of which few original parts remain after it was damaged in 1400
- Castle of Conturbia, also modified
- Parish church of San Vittore, documented as early as 978
- Baptistry of Agrate, in Romanesque style. It is dedicated to St. John the Baptist. The lower section (based on a Roman edifice) dates to about 930, while the upper one is from about 1120. It has an octagonal plan, with a small portal surmounted by a single mullioned window. Further triple, blind mullioned windows decorate each face of the building, as well as Lombard bands. The interior has some 15th-century frescoes.
- Faunistic Park La Torbiera, a zoo built in 1977
- Church of San Giorgio, located in Conturbia. It dates back to the year 1000 and was consecrated by bishop Litifredo between 1122 and 1148. Since then, it has undergone a series of renovations, all the while maintaining the original facade intact. The building is decorated with ancient frescoes.
- Church of Santa Maria della Valle, built around 1100 over an ancient temple dedicated to Minerva. The construction is made up of squared stone blocks, as well as cobblestones arranged in a herringbone pattern. Over time, it has undergone several renovations, but it still preserves some frescoes depicting Christ, symbols of the Four Evangelists and a plethora of saints.

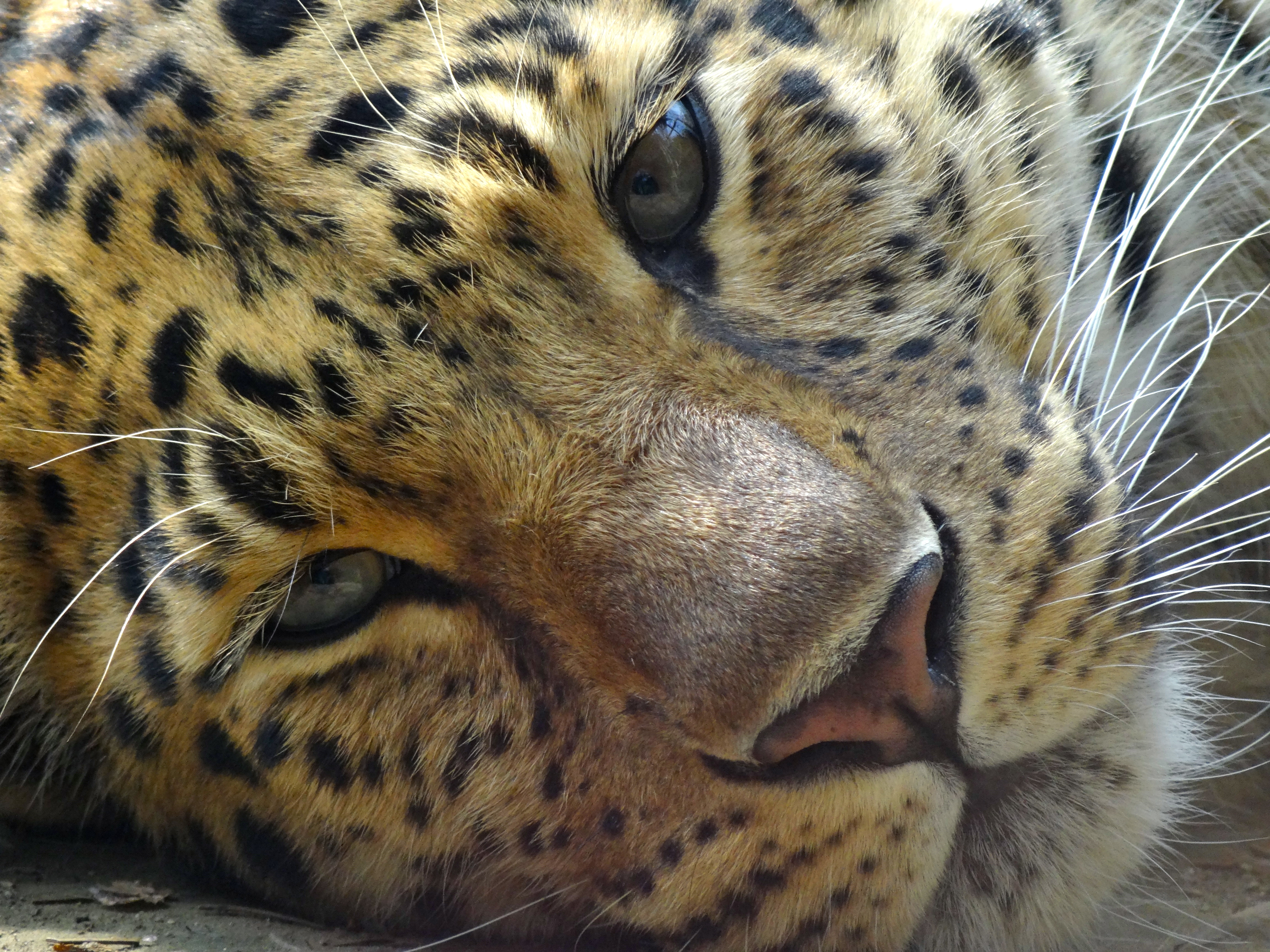
Amur leopard in Faunistic Park La Torbiera
