= Mezzomerico =

- Comune
- Comune di Mezzomerico
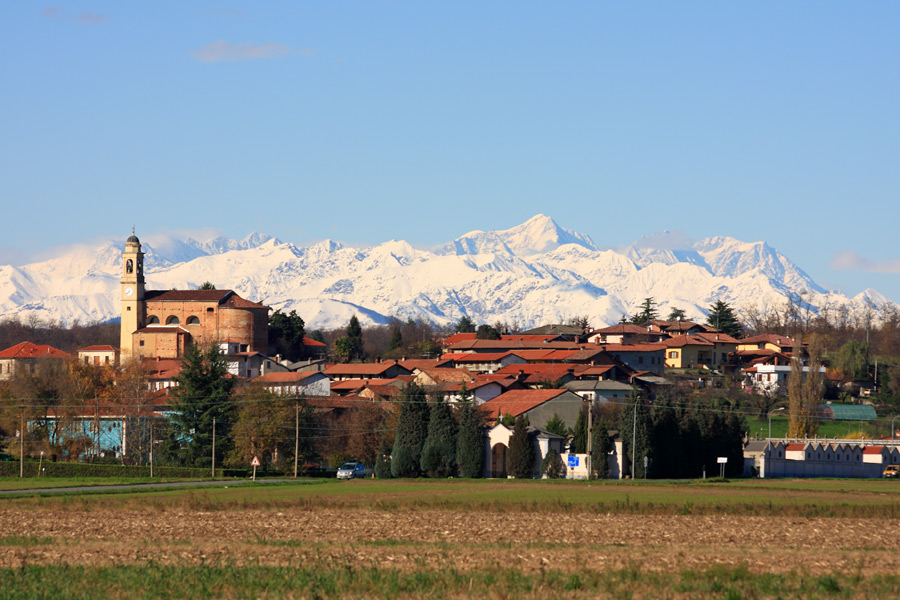
- View of Mezzomerico

- Location within Italy Location within Piedmont
- Coordinates: 45°37′N 8°36′E
- Country: Italy
- Region: Piedmont
- Province: Novara (NO)

Government
  - Mayor: Pietro Mattachini

Area
  - Total: 7.6 km^{2} (2.9 sq mi)
- Elevation: 266 m (873 ft)

Population (December 2004)
  - Total: 1,005
  - Density: 130/km^{2} (340/sq mi)
- Demonym: Mezzomerichesi
- Time zone: UTC+1 (CET)
  - Summer (DST): UTC+2 (CEST)
- Postal code: 28040
- Dialing code: 0321
- Website: Official website

Mezzomerico is a comune (municipality) in the Province of Novara in the Italian region Piedmont, located about 90 kilometres (56 mi) northeast of Turin and about 20 kilometres (12 mi) north of Novara.

Mezzomerico borders the following municipalities: Agrate Conturbia, Divignano, Marano Ticino, Oleggio, Suno, and Vaprio d'Agogna.

The name of the town shows its origins as Celtic Mediomatrici settlement; the name was attested as Mediomadrigo in 980.
