= Cavaglio d'Agogna =

- Comune
- Comune di Cavaglio d'Agogna
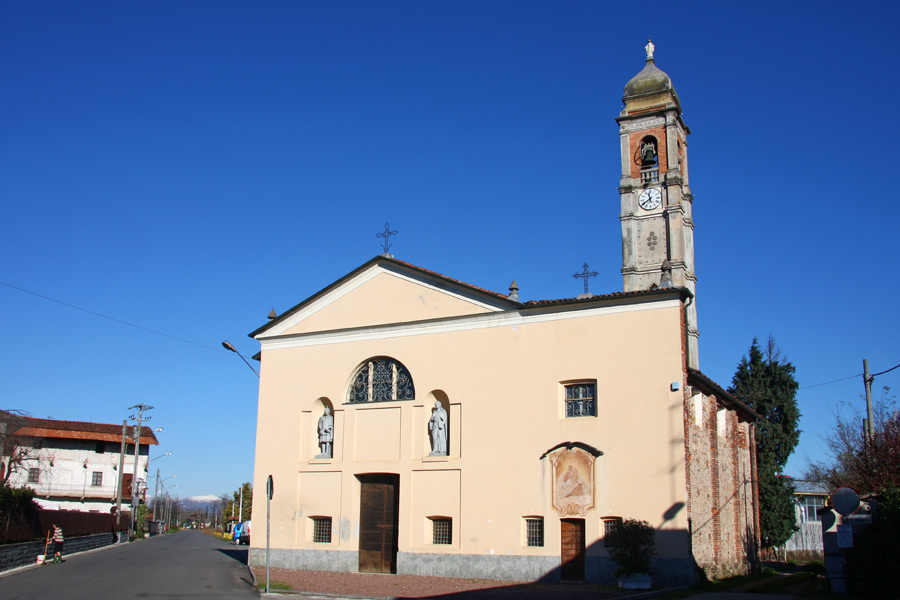
- Parish church, Cavaglio d'Agogna

- Coat of arms

- Location within Italy Location within Piedmont
- Coordinates: 45°37′N 8°29′E
- Country: Italy
- Region: Piedmont
- Province: Novara (NO)

Government
  - Mayor: Giangelo Zola

Area
  - Total: 9.83 km^{2} (3.80 sq mi)
- Elevation: 243 m (797 ft)

Population (Dec. 2004)
  - Total: 1,337
  - Density: 136/km^{2} (352/sq mi)
- Demonym: Cavagliesi
- Time zone: UTC+1 (CET)
  - Summer (DST): UTC+2 (CEST)
- Postal code: 28010
- Dialing code: 0322
- Website: Official website

Cavaglio d'Agogna is a comune (municipality) in the Province of Novara in the Italian region Piedmont, located about 90 kilometres (56 mi) northeast of Turin and about 20 kilometres (12 mi) northwest of Novara.

Cavaglio d'Agogna borders the following municipalities: Barengo, Cavaglietto, Fara Novarese, Fontaneto d'Agogna, Ghemme, and Sizzano.
