= San Nicola di Baraggiola =

Church building in Borgomanero, Italy

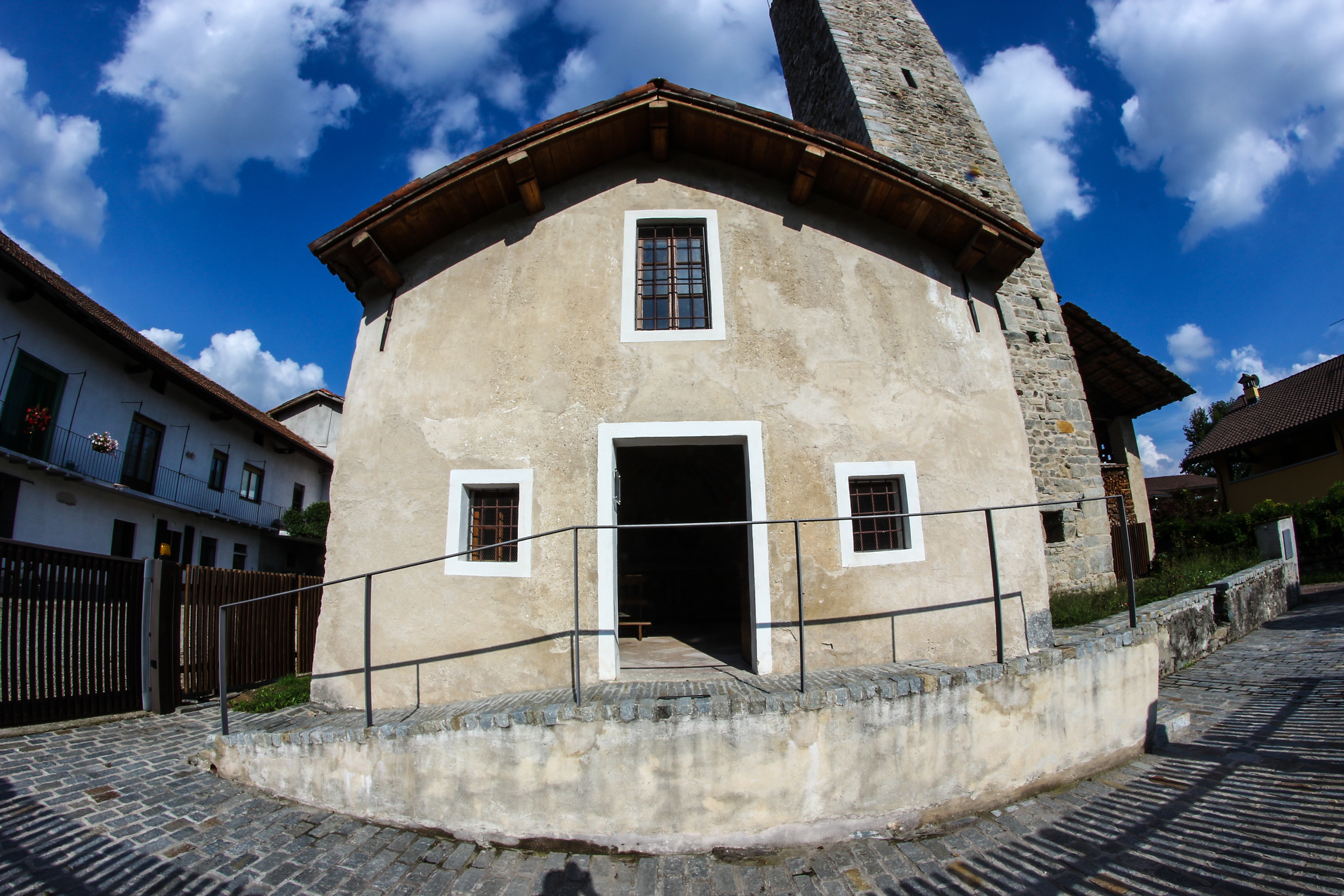
Church of San Nicola, Borgomanero

San Nicola di Baraggiola is a Roman Catholic church located in the neighbourhood of Baraggiola (o Barazzola), in the town limits of Borgomanero, province of Novara, Piedmont, Italy.

== History ==
A structure at the site is documented by the 10th century. In the 12th century, the church was linked to Augustinian eremitic monks, with an adjacent monastery. The spare-appearing church has a single nave and ends in a semicircular apse. The tall 10th-century bell-tower, which doubled as watch-tower, is a Romanesque structure with mullioned windows.
