= Oleggio =

- Comune
- Comune di Oleggio
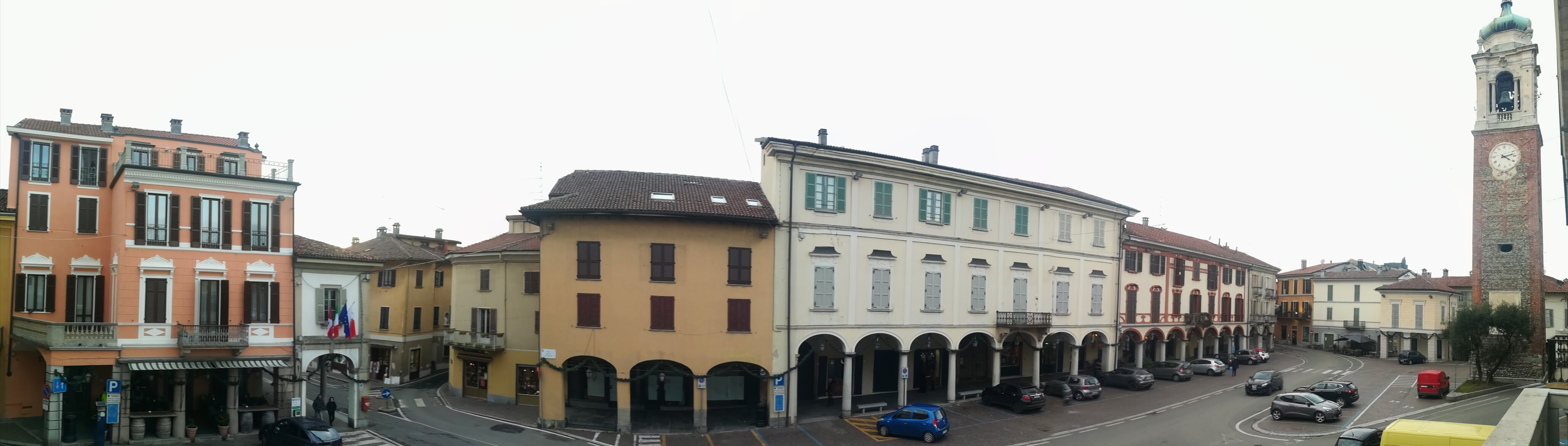
- View of Oleggio

- Coat of arms

- Location within Italy Location within Piedmont
- Coordinates: 45°36′N 8°38′E
- Country: Italy
- Region: Piedmont
- Province: Province of Novara (NO)

Area
  - Total: 37.8 km^{2} (14.6 sq mi)

Population (Dec. 2004)
  - Total: 12,490
  - Density: 330/km^{2} (856/sq mi)
- Demonym: Oleggesi
- Time zone: UTC+1 (CET)
  - Summer (DST): UTC+2 (CEST)
- Postal code: 28047
- Dialing code: +39 0321
- Website: Official website

Oleggio is a comune (municipality) in the Province of Novara in the Italian region Piedmont, located about 90 kilometres (56 mi) northeast of Turin and about 15 kilometres (9 mi) north of Novara. As of 31 December 2004, it had a population of 12,490 and an area of 37.8 square kilometres (14.6 mi^{2}).

Among its churches is the 10th-century, Romanesque-style San Michele.

== Geography ==
Oleggio borders the following municipalities: Bellinzago Novarese, Marano Ticino, Mezzomerico, Momo, Vaprio d'Agogna, and Vizzola Ticino.

== Demographic evolution ==
Historical population

Year	Pop.	±%
1861	8,279	—
1871	8,236	−0.5%
1881	8,689	+5.5%
1901	9,164	+5.5%
1911	8,956	−2.3%

Year	Pop.	±%
1921	8,326	−7.0%
1931	7,992	−4.0%
1936	8,201	+2.6%
1951	8,591	+4.8%
1961	9,398	+9.4%

Year	Pop.	±%
1971	10,158	+8.1%
1981	11,164	+9.9%
1991	11,314	+1.3%
2001	12,191	+7.8%

Source: Data from ISTAT
