= Oratory of Santa Caterina, Borgomanero =

Oratory in Borgomanero, Italy

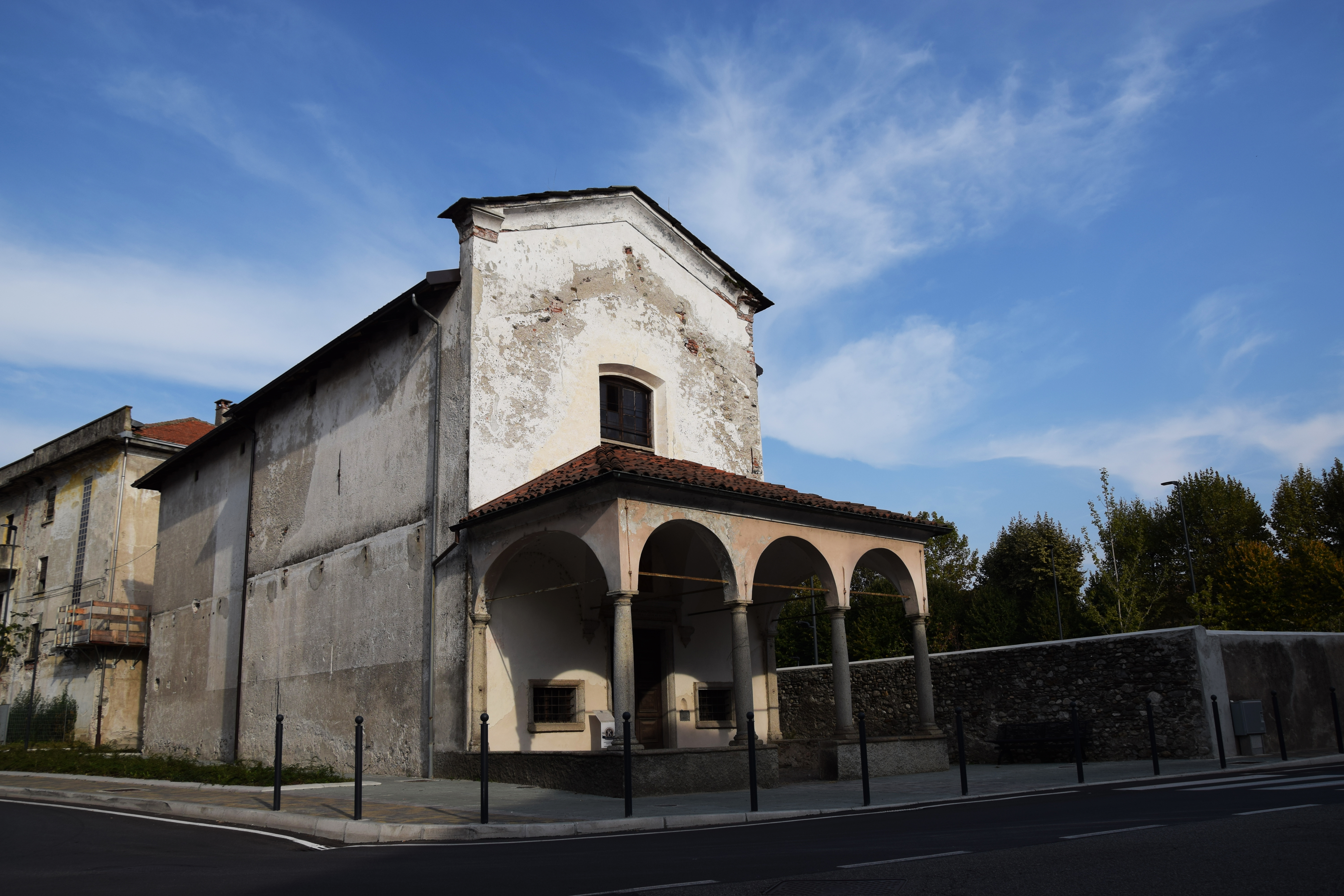
Santa Caterina in Borgomanero

Santa Caterina is a Roman Catholic oratory in the town limits of Borgomanero, province of Novara, Piedmont, Italy.

== History ==
A church at the site was present near Ponte Araldo over the Agogna river by the 12th century. It was rebuilt in 1500, and again as an ex-voto after the ebbing of the plague in 1630-1631. The present layout with a portico is owed to a 1680 reconstruction patronized by the Ramellini family.
