= La Torbiera =

Park in Piedmont, Italy

Coordinates: 45.6833°N 8.5500°E

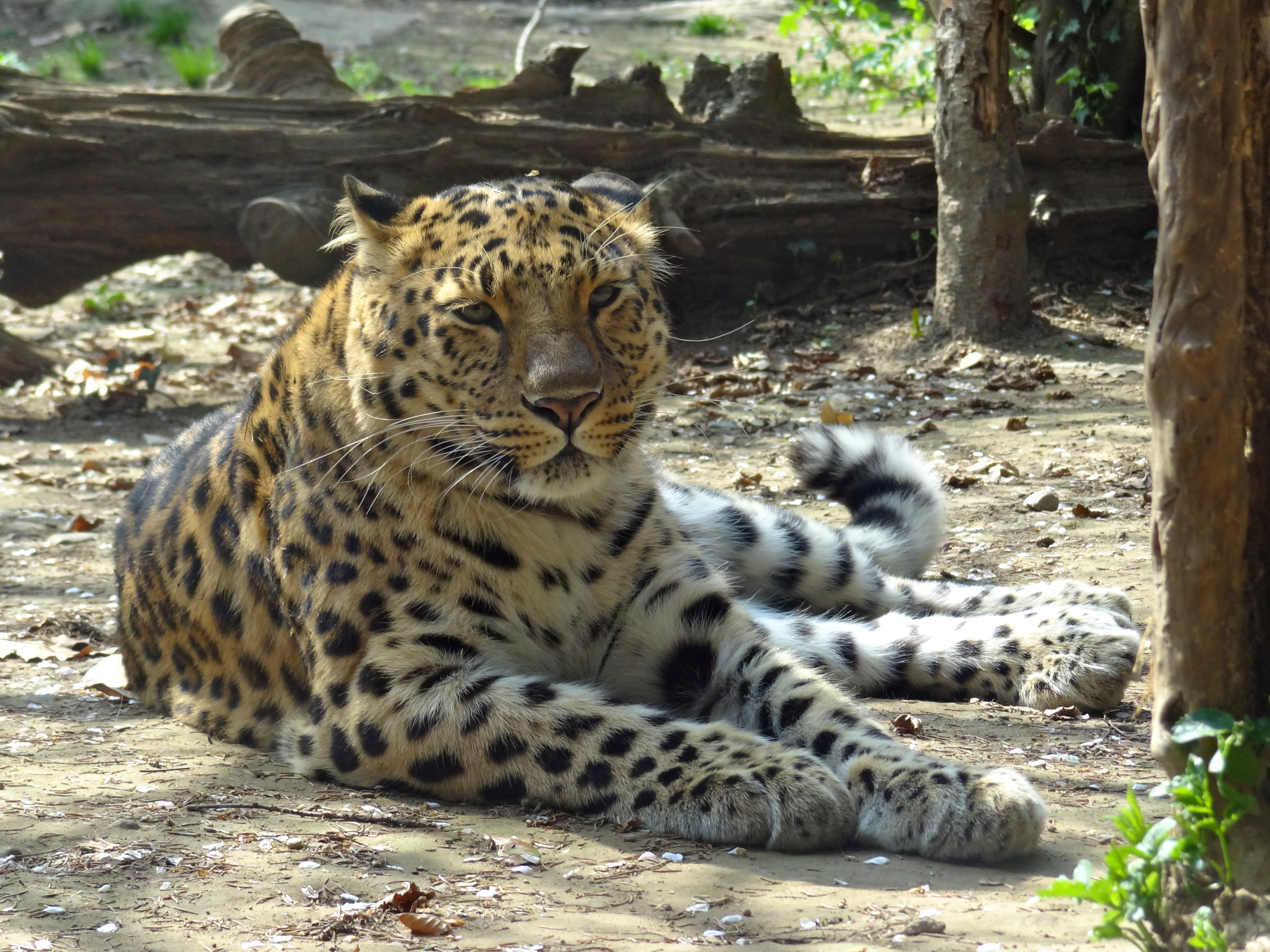
- Amur leopard
- Interactive map of La Torbiera
- Type: Zoo
- Location: Agrate Conturbia, Italy
- Area: 400.000 m2
- Created: 1977
- Status: Open all year

La Torbiera is a park that consists of an area open to the public and a protected area for wildlife preservation. It was established in Agrate Conturbia, Piedmont, Italy in 1977 to preserve and study some animal species in danger of extinction.

== Environment ==
La Torbiera is located in a border area between the Po Valley and the Prealps, characterized by a mild but damp climate and plenty of small lakes. This provides a very favourable environment for the development of mires, which are born progressively by the accumulation of dead parts of vegetables on the bottom of lakes. In wet soil, oxygen deficiency prevents the oxidation processes and the complete decomposition of plants.

The vegetable remains are transformed therefore only partially, becoming peat, and they collect on the bottom, progressively decreasing the depth of the basin. In this way, the plants of the shore can be pushed towards the inside, reducing, until its demise, the surface of the water. The park, covering an area of 40 acres, provides shelter for many animal species. There are about 400 specimens relative to 130 wildlife species, mostly from the Palaearctic region.

== Gallery ==
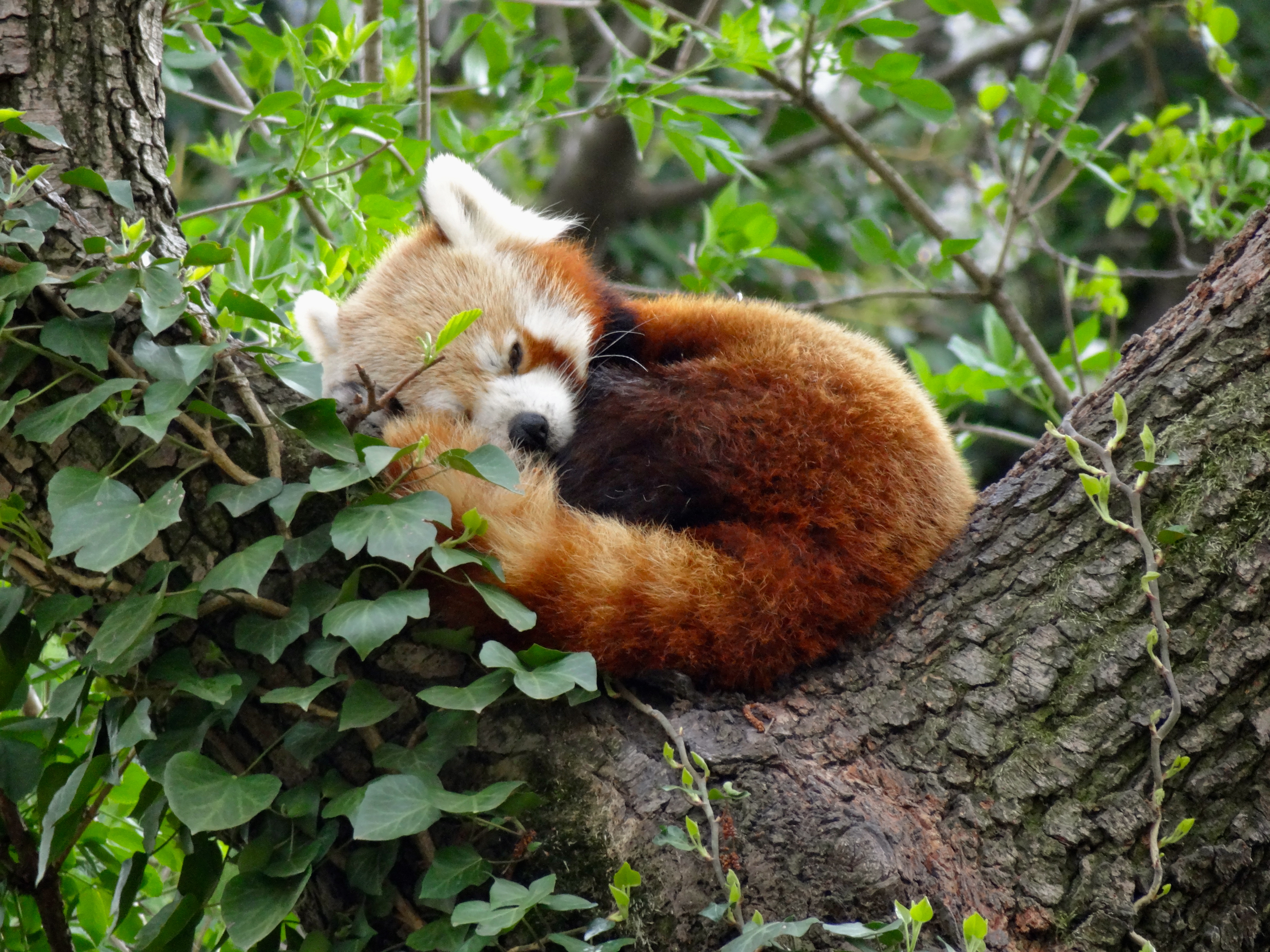
Red panda

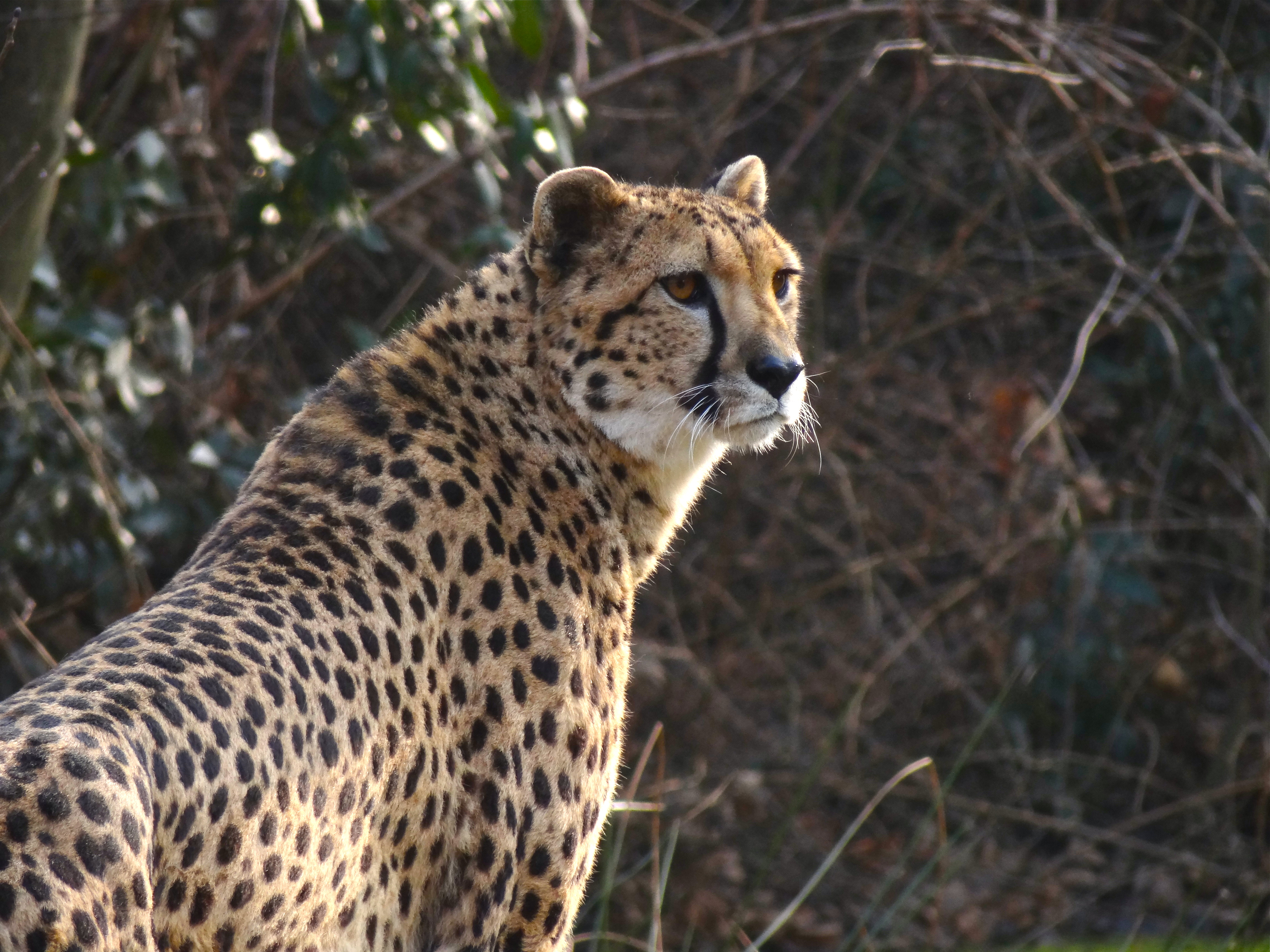
South African cheetah

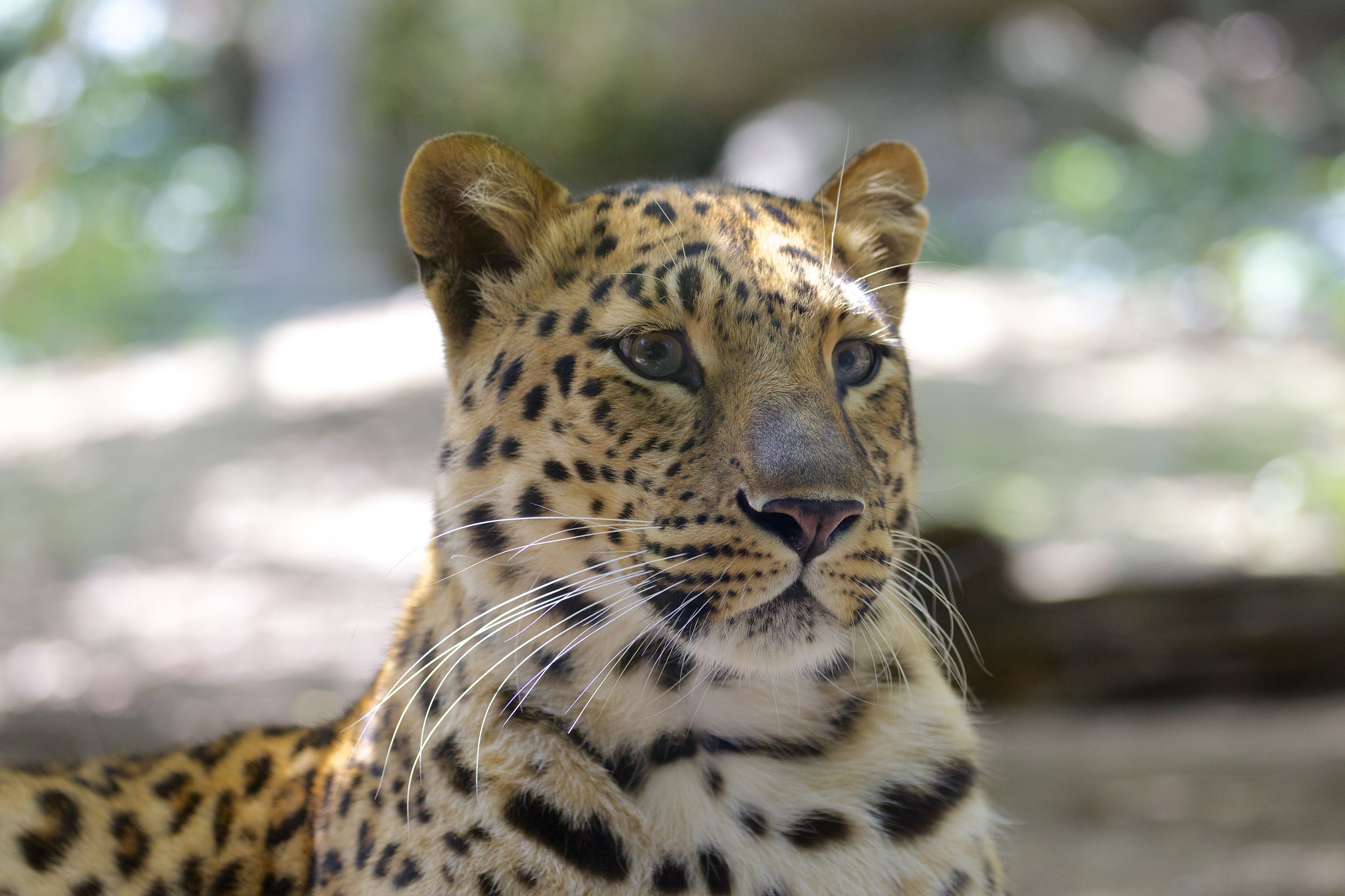
Amur leopard

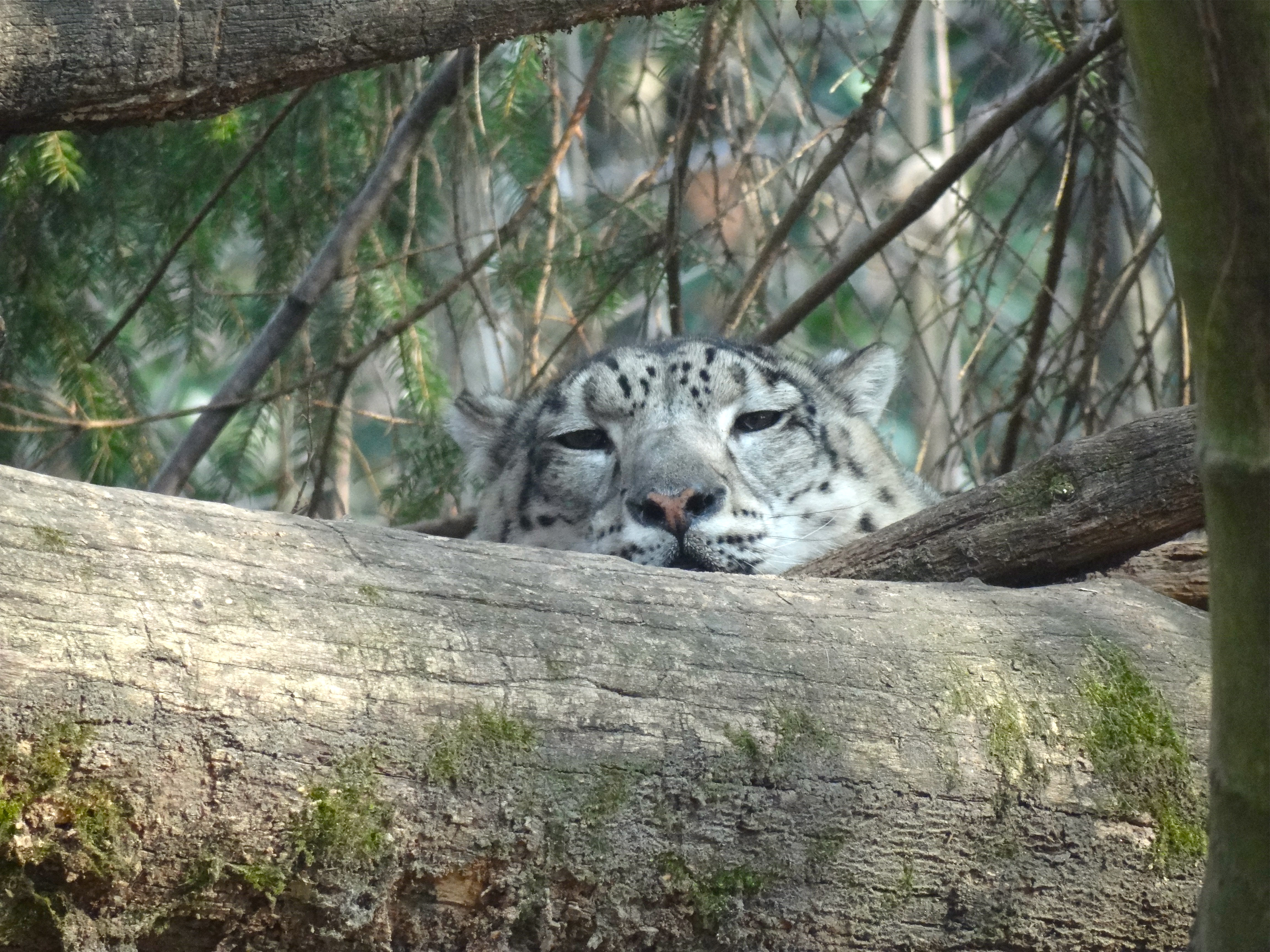
Snow leopard
