= Cressa, Piedmont =

Cressa
- Comune
- Comune di Cressa
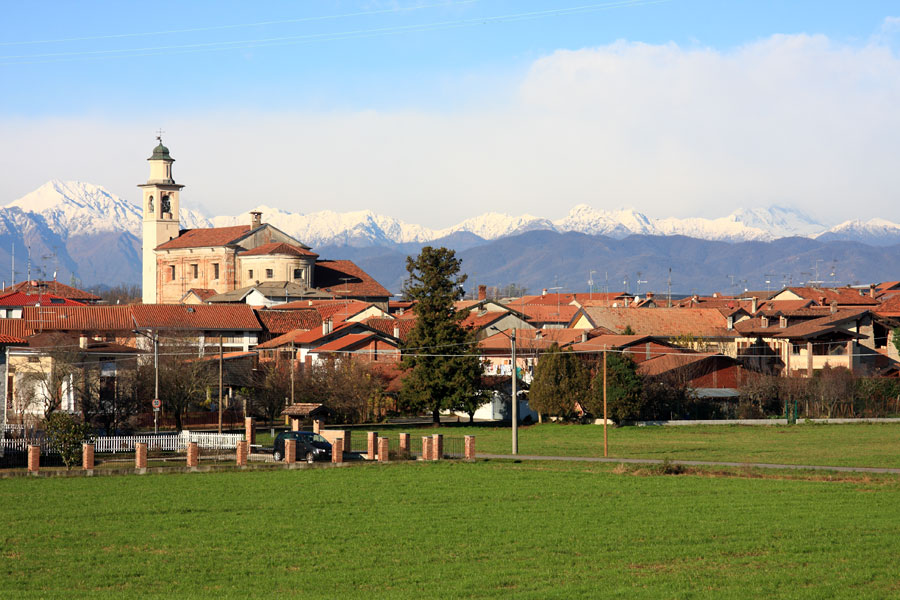
- View of Cressa

- Location within Italy Location within Piedmont
- Coordinates: 45°39′N 8°31′E
- Country: Italy
- Region: Piedmont
- Province: Novara (NO)

Government
  - Mayor: Gino Tacca

Area
  - Total: 7.1 km^{2} (2.7 sq mi)
- Elevation: 267 m (876 ft)

Population (Dec. 2004)
  - Total: 1,480
  - Density: 210/km^{2} (540/sq mi)
- Demonym: Cressesi
- Time zone: UTC+1 (CET)
  - Summer (DST): UTC+2 (CEST)
- Postal code: 28012
- Dialing code: 0322
- Website: Official website

Cressa is a comune (municipality) in the Province of Novara in the Italian region Piedmont, located about 90 kilometres (56 mi) northeast of Turin and about 25 kilometres (16 mi) northwest of Novara.

Cressa borders the following municipalities: Bogogno, Borgomanero, Fontaneto d'Agogna, and Suno.
