= Fara Novarese =

- Comune
- Comune di Fara Novarese
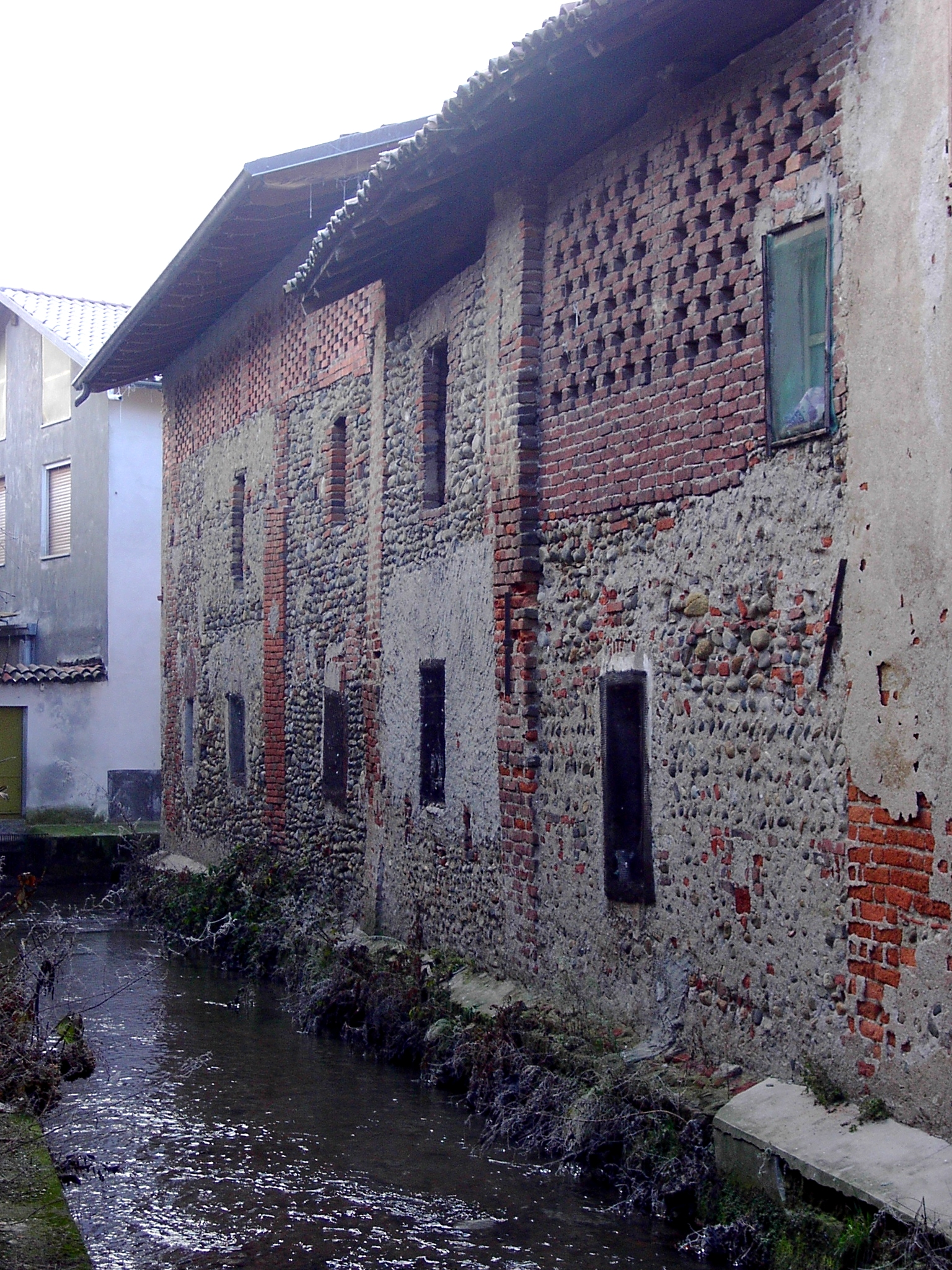
- Canal at Via Cavour in Fara Novarese

- Location within Italy Location within Piedmont
- Coordinates: 45°33′N 8°28′E
- Country: Italy
- Region: Piedmont
- Province: Novara (NO)

Government
  - Mayor: Aldo Giordano

Area
  - Total: 9.4 km^{2} (3.6 sq mi)
- Elevation: 210 m (690 ft)

Population (30 April 217)
  - Total: 2,031
  - Density: 220/km^{2} (560/sq mi)
- Demonym: Faresi
- Time zone: UTC+1 (CET)
  - Summer (DST): UTC+2 (CEST)
- Postal code: 28073
- Dialing code: 0321
- Website: Official website

Fara Novarese is a comune (municipality) in the Province of Novara in the Italian region of Piedmont, located about 80 kilometres (50 mi) northeast of Turin and about 15 kilometres (9 mi) northwest of Novara.

Fara Novarese borders the following municipalities: Barengo, Briona, Carpignano Sesia, Cavaglio d'Agogna, and Sizzano.

== Fara DOC ==
Fara DOC is a red Italian wine with Denominazione di Origine Controllata status produced in the Piedmontese villages of Fara Novarese and Briona. It was awarded DOC status in 1969.

The wine is a blend of Nebbiolo (known locally as Spanna), Vespolina and Uva Rara grape varieties.

A minimum of 22 months total aging is required, of which at least 12 months in wood from the 1st of November of the year of harvest. Riserva needs a minimum of 34 months total aging, of which at least 20 months in wood from the 1st of November of the year of harvest.
