= Fontaneto d'Agogna =

- Comune
- Comune di Fontaneto d'Agogna
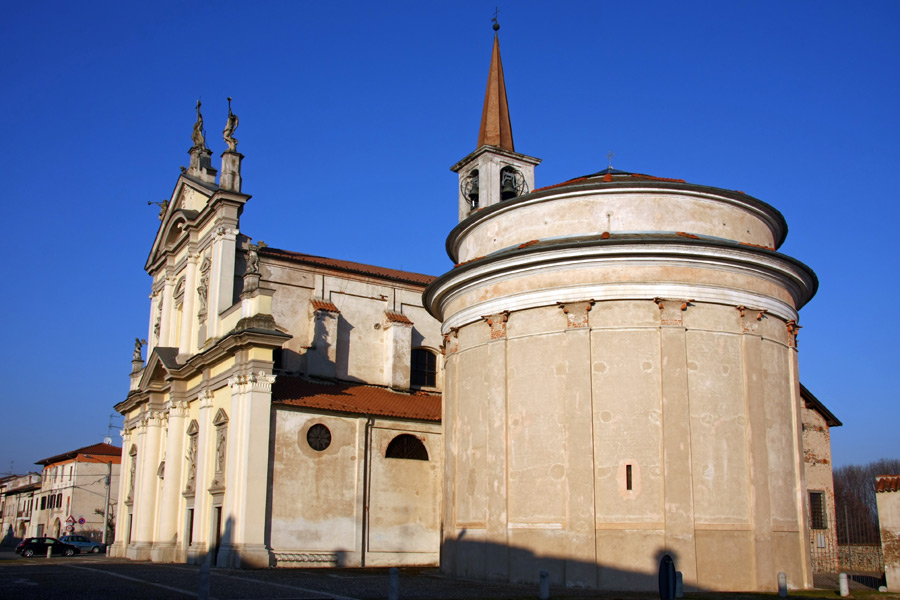
- Church in Fontaneto d'Agogna

- Coat of arms

- Location within Italy Location within Piedmont
- Coordinates: 45°39′N 8°29′E
- Country: Italy
- Region: Piedmont
- Province: Novara (NO)
- Frazioni: Balchi, Baraggia, Cacciana, Camuccioni, Cascinetto, Molino Marco, San Martino, Santa Croce, Sant'Ambrogio, Sant'Antonio, Tapulino, Tuvina, Vella Ciavone

Government
  - Mayor: Alfio Angelini

Area
  - Total: 21.17 km^{2} (8.17 sq mi)
- Elevation: 260 m (850 ft)

Population (Dec. 2004)
  - Total: 2,651
  - Density: 125.2/km^{2} (324.3/sq mi)
- Demonym: Fontanetesi
- Time zone: UTC+1 (CET)
  - Summer (DST): UTC+2 (CEST)
- Postal code: 28010
- Dialing code: 0322

Fontaneto d'Agogna is a comune (municipality) in the Province of Novara in the Italian region Piedmont, located about 90 kilometres (56 mi) northeast of Turin and about 25 kilometres (16 mi) northwest of Novara. It takes its name from the Agogna stream.

Fontaneto d'Agogna borders the following municipalities: Borgomanero, Cavaglietto, Cavaglio d'Agogna, Cavallirio, Cressa, Cureggio, Ghemme, Romagnano Sesia, and Suno.

== Main sights ==
- Parish Church of Beata Vergine Maria Assunta - It was built on a pre-existing cemetery church of the 11th century. The bell tower was built next to the chancel in the mid-16th century, and the choir was added in 1617. In the mid-19th century, the architect Alessandro Antonelli created the scurolo of Sant'Alessandro (i.e. a small chapel that houses the relics of the saint, which were brought from Rome to Fontaneto d'Agogna). Inside this circular building, connected to the church, there are important pictorial works dating back to the 16th and 17th centuries.
- Church of San Martino - It was first mentioned in the Consignationes by the curia of Novara in 1347. The church has three naves and a facade with 18th-century frescoes. It is located near the spring known as Fontana di San Martino, as it is associated with rituals linked to the cult of water, inspired by ancient pagan cultures. Nowadays, it is believed that these waters are spiritually purifying, since they flow near the fresco of the Virgin Mary by Sperindio Cagnola, which can be found inside the church.
