= Sizzano =

- Comune
- Comune di Sizzano
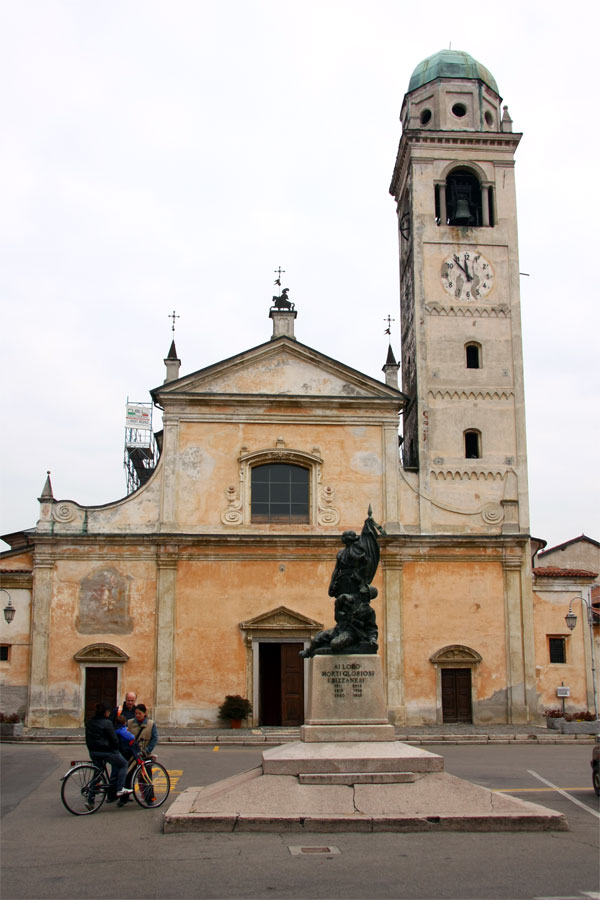
- Parish Church, Sizzano

- Location within Italy Location within Piedmont
- Coordinates: 45°35′N 8°26′E
- Country: Italy
- Region: Piedmont
- Province: Province of Novara (NO)

Area
  - Total: 10.5 km^{2} (4.1 sq mi)

Population (Dec. 2004)
  - Total: 1,452
  - Density: 138/km^{2} (358/sq mi)
- Time zone: UTC+1 (CET)
  - Summer (DST): UTC+2 (CEST)
- Postal code: 28070
- Dialing code: 0321

Sizzano is a comune (municipality) in the Province of Novara in the Italian region Piedmont, located about 80 kilometres (50 mi) northeast of Turin and about 20 kilometres (12 mi) northwest of Novara. As of 31 December 2004, it had a population of 1,452 and an area of 10.5 square kilometres (4.1 mi^{2}).

Sizzano borders the following municipalities: Carpignano Sesia, Cavaglio d'Agogna, Fara Novarese, and Ghemme.

== Sizzano DOC ==
The comune of Sizzano is home to the Denominazione di origine controllata (DOC) wine which includes 20 hectares (50 acres) producing a single red wine. The wine is a blend of 40 to 60% Nebbiolo (known locally as Spanna), 15 to 40% Vespolina and up to 25% of Uva Rara (known locally as Bonarda Novarese). All grapes destined for DOC wine production need to be harvested to a yield no greater than 10 tonnes/ha. The wine is the required to be aged in barrels for at least two years with another additional year of aging in the bottle before it can be released to the public. The finished wine must attain a minimum alcohol level of 12% in order to be labelled with the Sizzano DOC designation.

== Demographic evolution ==
Historical population

Year	Pop.	±%
1861	1,282	—
1871	1,499	+16.9%
1881	1,732	+15.5%
1901	1,897	+9.5%
1911	1,851	−2.4%

Year	Pop.	±%
1921	1,758	−5.0%
1931	1,662	−5.5%
1936	1,656	−0.4%
1951	1,618	−2.3%
1961	1,523	−5.9%

Year	Pop.	±%
1971	1,481	−2.8%
1981	1,475	−0.4%
1991	1,434	−2.8%
2001	1,458	+1.7%

Source: Data from ISTAT
