= Barengo =

- Comune
- Comune di Barengo
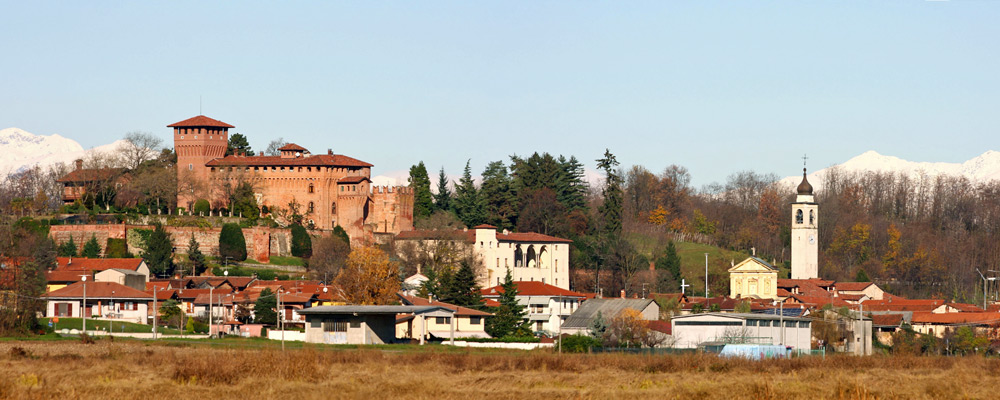
- View of Barengo

- Coat of arms

- Location within Italy Location within Piedmont
- Coordinates: 45°34′N 8°31′E
- Country: Italy
- Region: Piedmont
- Province: Novara (NO)
- Frazioni: Bischiavino, Vallazza

Government
  - Mayor: Fabio Maggeni

Area
  - Total: 19.49 km^{2} (7.53 sq mi)
- Elevation: 225 m (738 ft)

Population (1-1-2021)
  - Total: 745
  - Density: 38.2/km^{2} (99.0/sq mi)
- Demonym: Barenghese(i)
- Time zone: UTC+1 (CET)
  - Summer (DST): UTC+2 (CEST)
- Postal code: 28010
- Dialing code: 0321
- Patron saint: Santa Maria Assunta
- Saint day: 15 August
- Website: Official website

Barengo (Piedmontese and Lombard: Barengh) is a comune (municipality) in the Province of Novara in the Italian region Piedmont, located about 80 kilometres (50 mi) northeast of Turin and about 15 kilometres (9 mi) northwest of Novara.

Barengo borders the following municipalities: Briona, Cavaglietto, Cavaglio d'Agogna, Fara Novarese, Momo, and Vaprio d'Agogna.

The footballer Giampiero Boniperti was born in Barengo.
