= Cavaglietto =

- Comune
- Comune di Cavaglietto
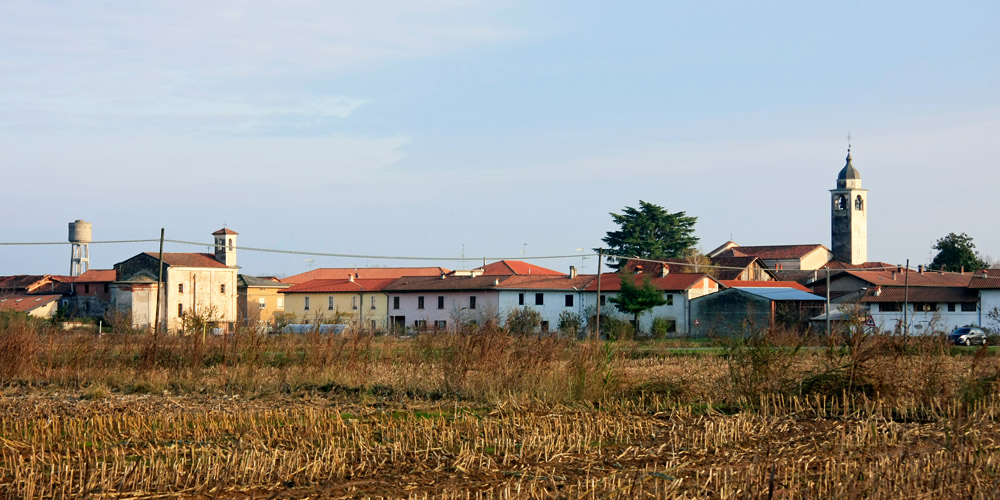

- Coat of arms

- Location within Italy Location within Piedmont
- Coordinates: 45°36′N 8°30′E
- Country: Italy
- Region: Piedmont
- Province: Novara (NO)

Government
  - Mayor: Laura Lanaro

Area
  - Total: 6.6 km^{2} (2.5 sq mi)
- Elevation: 233 m (764 ft)

Population (Dec. 2004)
  - Total: 417
  - Density: 63/km^{2} (160/sq mi)
- Demonym: Cavagliettesi
- Time zone: UTC+1 (CET)
  - Summer (DST): UTC+2 (CEST)
- Postal code: 28010
- Dialing code: 0322
- Website: Official website

Cavaglietto is a municipality in the Province of Novara in the Italian region Piedmont, located about 90 kilometres (56 mi) northeast of Turin and about 20 kilometres (12 mi) northwest of Novara.

Cavaglietto borders the following municipalities: Barengo, Cavaglio d'Agogna, Fontaneto d'Agogna, Suno, and Vaprio d'Agogna.
