= List of municipalities of the Province of Vercelli =

The following is a list of the 82 municipalities (comuni) of the Province of Vercelli in the region of Piedmont in Italy.

== List ==
Municipality	Population (2026)	Area (km²)	Density
Alagna Valsesia	731	133.18	5.5
Albano Vercellese	327	13.78	23.7
Alice Castello	2,479	24.57	100.9
Alto Sermenza	133	60.32	2.2
Arborio	836	23.31	35.9
Asigliano Vercellese	1,387	26.32	52.7
Balmuccia	115	9.79	11.7
Balocco	210	16.81	12.5
Bianzè	1,869	41.81	44.7
Boccioleto	167	33.87	4.9
Borgo d'Ale	2,198	39.57	55.5
Borgo Vercelli	2,231	19.30	115.6
Borgosesia	11,951	41.09	290.8
Buronzo	862	25.08	34.4
Campertogno	226	34.14	6.6
Carcoforo	78	22.80	3.4
Caresana	995	24.11	41.3
Caresanablot	1,110	11.02	100.7
Carisio	744	30.11	24.7
Casanova Elvo	220	16.21	13.6
Cellio con Breia	957	17.28	55.4
Cervatto	47	9.54	4.9
Cigliano	4,300	25.31	169.9
Civiasco	223	7.39	30.2
Collobiano	68	9.22	7.4
Costanzana	815	20.97	38.9
Cravagliana	240	34.86	6.9
Crescentino	7,503	48.22	155.6
Crova	347	14.02	24.8
Desana	1,097	16.48	66.6
Fobello	185	28.14	6.6
Fontanetto Po	1,036	23.24	44.6
Formigliana	488	16.76	29.1
Gattinara	7,548	33.67	224.2
Ghislarengo	820	12.50	65.6
Greggio	330	11.88	27.8
Guardabosone	296	6.09	48.6
Lamporo	468	9.64	48.5
Lenta	759	18.97	40.0
Lignana	551	22.57	24.4
Livorno Ferraris	4,248	58.03	73.2
Lozzolo	753	6.67	112.9
Mollia	100	13.92	7.2
Moncrivello	1,360	20.18	67.4
Motta de' Conti	702	11.72	59.9
Olcenengo	774	16.50	46.9
Oldenico	236	6.53	36.1
Palazzolo Vercellese	1,088	13.94	78.0
Pertengo	331	8.30	39.9
Pezzana	1,289	17.35	74.3
Pila	142	8.69	16.3
Piode	193	13.60	14.2
Postua	521	16.18	32.2
Prarolo	720	11.54	62.4
Quarona	3,715	16.16	229.9
Quinto Vercellese	381	10.90	35.0
Rassa	66	43.27	1.5
Rimella	139	26.27	5.3
Rive	427	9.41	45.4
Roasio	2,142	27.92	76.7
Ronsecco	560	24.48	22.9
Rossa	167	11.84	14.1
Rovasenda	885	29.27	30.2
Salasco	194	12.19	15.9
Sali Vercellese	88	8.78	10.0
Saluggia	3,752	31.60	118.7
San Germano Vercellese	1,615	30.63	52.7
San Giacomo Vercellese	263	9.60	27.4
Santhià	8,024	53.13	151.0
Scopa	381	22.53	16.9
Scopello	388	18.25	21.3
Serravalle Sesia	4,636	20.91	221.7
Stroppiana	1,199	18.31	65.5
Tricerro	661	12.25	54.0
Trino	6,760	70.61	95.7
Tronzano Vercellese	3,271	44.75	73.1
Valduggia	1,785	28.43	62.8
Varallo	6,832	102.97	66.3
Vercelli	46,391	79.78	581.5
Villarboit	366	25.51	14.3
Villata	1,518	14.58	104.1
Vocca	156	20.26	7.7

== See also ==
- List of municipalities of Piedmont
- List of municipalities of Italy
