= Caresana =

Caresana may refer to:

- Cristofaro Caresana (ca. 1640-1709), Italian baroque composer
- Caresana, Piedmont, a municipality in Italy
- San Dorligo della Valle or Caresana (Slovene: Mačkolje), a village in the Province of Trieste

== See also ==
- Caresanablot
