= Antonio della Chiesa =

Italian Catholic priest

Blessed Antonio della Chiesa O.P.
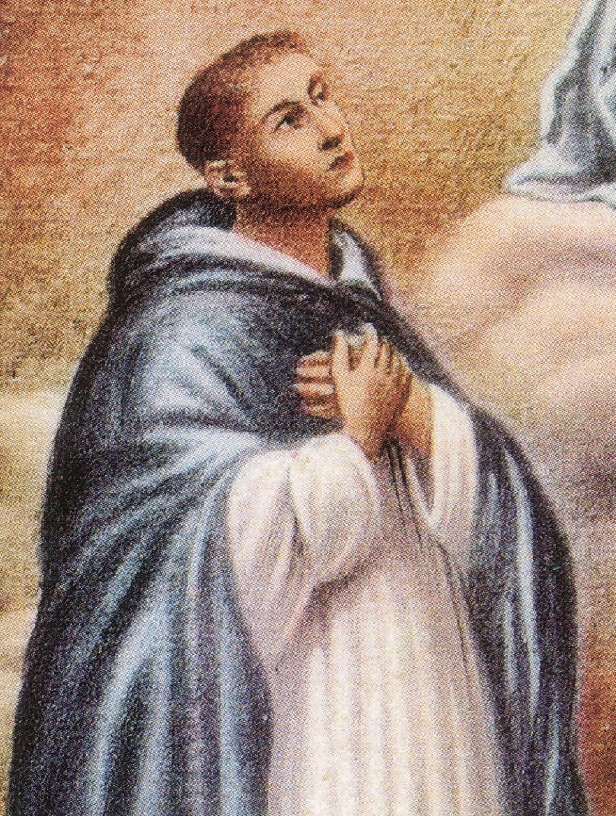

Religious
- Born: 1394; San Germano Vercellese
- Died: 22 January 1459 (aged 64)
- Venerated in: Roman Catholic Church
- Beatified: 15 May 1819, Saint Peter's Basilica, Papal States by Pope Pius VII
- Major shrine: San Germano Vercellese
- Feast: 22 January
- Attributes: Dominican habit
- Patronage: Missionaries

Antonio della Chiesa, OP (1394 - 22 January 1459) was an Italian Catholic priest and member of the Dominican Order. He was a companion of Bernardino of Siena and was beatified by Pope Pius VII in 1819.

== Overview ==
Della Chiesa was born in 1394 as the son of the Marquis della Chiesa in San Germano Vercellese. He was well-educated due to being a noble and demonstrated a keen taste for the religious life. He devoted himself to the service of God and grew up with the hopes of joining the clergy. His father opposed this desire, which later led to his son breaking off all links to his parents.

Della Chiesa became a member of the Order of Preachers in Vercelli at the age of 22 and soon gained recognition as an apt preacher and confessor. He accompanied Bernardine of Siena on a range of missions and served in various capacities in the Dominican priories. Among those positions was that of the prior and he served at the priory of Como and Florence as well as in Savona and Bologna. In Como, he reformed the life and morals of the town and was sent to govern other friaries following this success. It was at those friaries that he insisted on a rigorous observance of the Rule of St Augustine and the pattern of conventual life laid down by Saint Dominic.

Della Chiesa was also one of the leaders opposing the last of the antipopes: Felix V who troubled the Roman Catholic Church from 1440 until 1449. Felix V had a large support network stemming from Switzerland and della Chiesa opposed the work of the antipope. He succeeded in winning over a large number of the antipope's adherents to the lawful power of the recognised Pontiff, Pope Eugene IV and later Pope Nicholas V.

While on a trip from Savona to Genoa, he was captured by pirates but he was released unharmed. He had been apprehended with a fellow friar and the pirates released the pair after being so impressed with their demeanor. He was a known miracle worker and was said to be able to read the consciences of men and women alike.

Della Chiesa died in 1459 and was able to predict the date of his death. His relics were translated on 28 July 1810 to his birthplace. Pope Pius VII affirmed his cultus and beatified him on 15 May 1819, while setting his liturgical feast for 28 July, the date of the translation of his relics.

Antonio della Chiesa is an ancestor of Giacomo della Chiesa - the future Pope Benedict XV (1854-1922) who reigned during World War I over four centuries after Antonio's own life.
