= Desana =

- Comune
- Comune di Desana
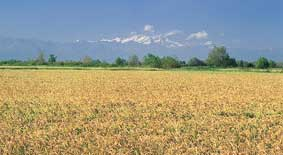

- Location within Italy Location within Piedmont
- Coordinates: 45°16′N 8°21′E
- Country: Italy
- Region: Piedmont
- Province: Vercelli (VC)

Government
  - Mayor: Roberto Ferrarotti

Area
  - Total: 16.5 km^{2} (6.4 sq mi)
- Elevation: 131 m (430 ft)

Population (Dec. 2004)
  - Total: 1,085
  - Density: 65.8/km^{2} (170/sq mi)
- Demonym: Desanesi
- Time zone: UTC+1 (CET)
  - Summer (DST): UTC+2 (CEST)
- Postal code: 13034
- Dialing code: 0161
- Website: Official website

Desana (Dzan-a in Piedmontese) is a comune (municipality) in the Province of Vercelli in the Italian region Piedmont, located about 60 kilometres (37 mi) northeast of Turin and about 8 kilometres (5 mi) southwest of Vercelli.

Desana borders the following municipalities: Asigliano Vercellese, Costanzana, Lignana, Ronsecco, Tricerro, and Vercelli.

Desana Castle is located in the comune.
