= Bitter Rice =

1949 film directed by Giuseppe De Santis

- Original theatrical poster
- Italian: Riso amaro
- Directed by: Giuseppe De Santis
- Screenplay by: Corrado Alvaro; Giuseppe De Santis; Carlo Lizzani; Carlo Musso; Ivo Perilli; Gianni Puccini
- Story by: Giuseppe De Santis; Carlo Lizzani; Gianni Puccini
- Produced by: Dino De Laurentiis
- Starring: Vittorio Gassman; Doris Dowling; Silvana Mangano; Raf Vallone; Checco Rissone; Carlo Mazzarella
- Cinematography: Otello Martelli
- Edited by: Gabriele Varriale
- Music by: Goffredo Petrassi
- Production company: Lux Film
- Distributed by: Lux Film
- Release date: 7 September 1949
- Running time: 108 minutes
- Country: Italy
- Language: Italian

Bitter Rice (Italian: Riso amaro [ˈriːso aˈmaːro, ˈriːzo -]) is a 1949 Italian neorealist crime drama film directed and co-written by Giuseppe De Santis, produced by Dino De Laurentiis, and starring Vittorio Gassman, Doris Dowling, Silvana Mangano, and Raf Vallone. The story follows a pair of fugitives, who hide among the rice fields of northern Italy. The Italian title of the film is based on a pun; since the Italian word riso can mean either "rice" or "laughter", riso amaro can be taken to mean either "bitter laughter" or "bitter rice".

Released by Lux Film, Bitter Rice was a commercial success in Europe and the United States. It was nominated for the Palme d'Or at the 1949 Cannes Film Festival, and was nominated for the 1950 Academy Award for Best Story.

In 2008, the film was included on the Italian Ministry of Cultural Heritage’s 100 Italian films to be saved, a list of 100 films that "have changed the collective memory of the country between 1942 and 1978."

== Plot ==
A group of policeman patrol a train station where crowds of female workers are boarding trains for the rice paddies in the Province of Vercelli, in the upper reaches of Piedmont in the Po Valley, searching for the thieves who stole a valuable necklace. The thieves, Francesca and Walter, attempt to board a train without detection, with Walter briefly using rice worker Silvana as a distraction. Walter is identified, but Francesca escapes with the necklace onto the planters' train. There, she befriends Silvana who suspects her of lying about her identity and introduces her to the planters' way of life.

Francesca does not have a work permit, and struggles with the other "illegals" to find a place on the rice fields. At their lodgings, Silvana and Francesca meet a soon-to-be-discharged soldier, Marco, who unsuccessfully tries to attract Silvana's interest. Silvana steals the necklace from Francesca and ultimately incites a riot between the "illegals" and documented workers. Marco convinces Silvana to return the necklace, and the women reconcile. The documented and undocumented workers agree to work together and protest to the bosses until they agree allow the "illegals" a place in the fields.

Toward the end of the working season, Walter arrives at the rice farm, takes the necklace (revealed to be a fake), and becomes involved in a plot to steal a large quantity of rice. Francesca, having realized the abusive nature of Walter, refuses to help him rob the overworked women. However, Silvana becomes attracted to Walter's criminal lifestyle and he manipulates her with promises of marriage and wealth. Walter's attitude to Silvana changes frequently between cruelty and adoration, causing Silvana's psyche to deteriorate rapidly. Francesca eventually discovers their involvement and warns Marco, who is reluctant to believe her.

As a distraction for the heist, Silvana floods the rice fields during the celebration for the end of the working season. The flooding prevents Walter's accomplices from driving with the stolen rice, and they are caught by the workers. Francesca and Marco confront Silvana and Walter, during which Walter stabs Marco and Francesca shoots Walter. Francesca and Silvana face each other, each armed with hand-guns, and Silvana offers the necklace in exchange for their freedom. Francesca reveals it is a fake and Silvana has been manipulated by Walter. In response, Silvana turns her gun on Walter and kills him, before leaving in a daze. Francesca chases after Silvana, but is unable to prevent her from jumping to her death.

The following day, Francesca and Marco attend Silvana's funeral. As the other rice workers depart, they pay tribute to her by sprinkling rice upon her body.

== Cast ==
- Vittorio Gassman as Walter Granata
- Doris Dowling as Francesca
- Silvana Mangano as Silvana
- Raf Vallone as Marco
- Checco Rissone as Aristide
- Nico Pepe as Beppe
- Adriana Sivieri as Celeste
- Lia Corelli as Amelia
- Maria Grazia Francia as Gabriella
- Dedi Ristori as Anna
- Anna Maestri as Irene
- Mariemma Bardi as Gianna
- Maria Capuzzo as Giulia
- Isabella Zennaro as Rosa
- Carlo Mazzarella as Gianetto

== Themes ==
In the film, the character Silvana represents the allure of behavior modeled in American films, such as chewing gum and boogie-woogie dancing. Her downfall illustrates director Giuseppe De Santis's condemnation of these products of American capitalism. In addition, Silvana was considered by many audiences to be overly sexualized. This sexualization and the melodramatic presence of death and suicide in the film cause it to diverge from typical Italian neorealism.

Historical and social context

Bitter Rice is widely regarded as one of the key works of Italian neorealism, combining melodrama and crime elements with social commentary on postwar Italy. The film depicts the harsh working conditions of the mondine (female rice workers) in the Po Valley and explores themes of female labor, class struggle, and economic hardship in the late 1940s.

International impact and controversy

The film helped launch Silvana Mangano to international prominence and attracted attention abroad for its combination of realism and sensual imagery. Scholars have noted that its blend of social realism with melodramatic and crime elements sparked debate about the boundaries of neorealist cinema while still cementing its importance within the movement.

== Production ==
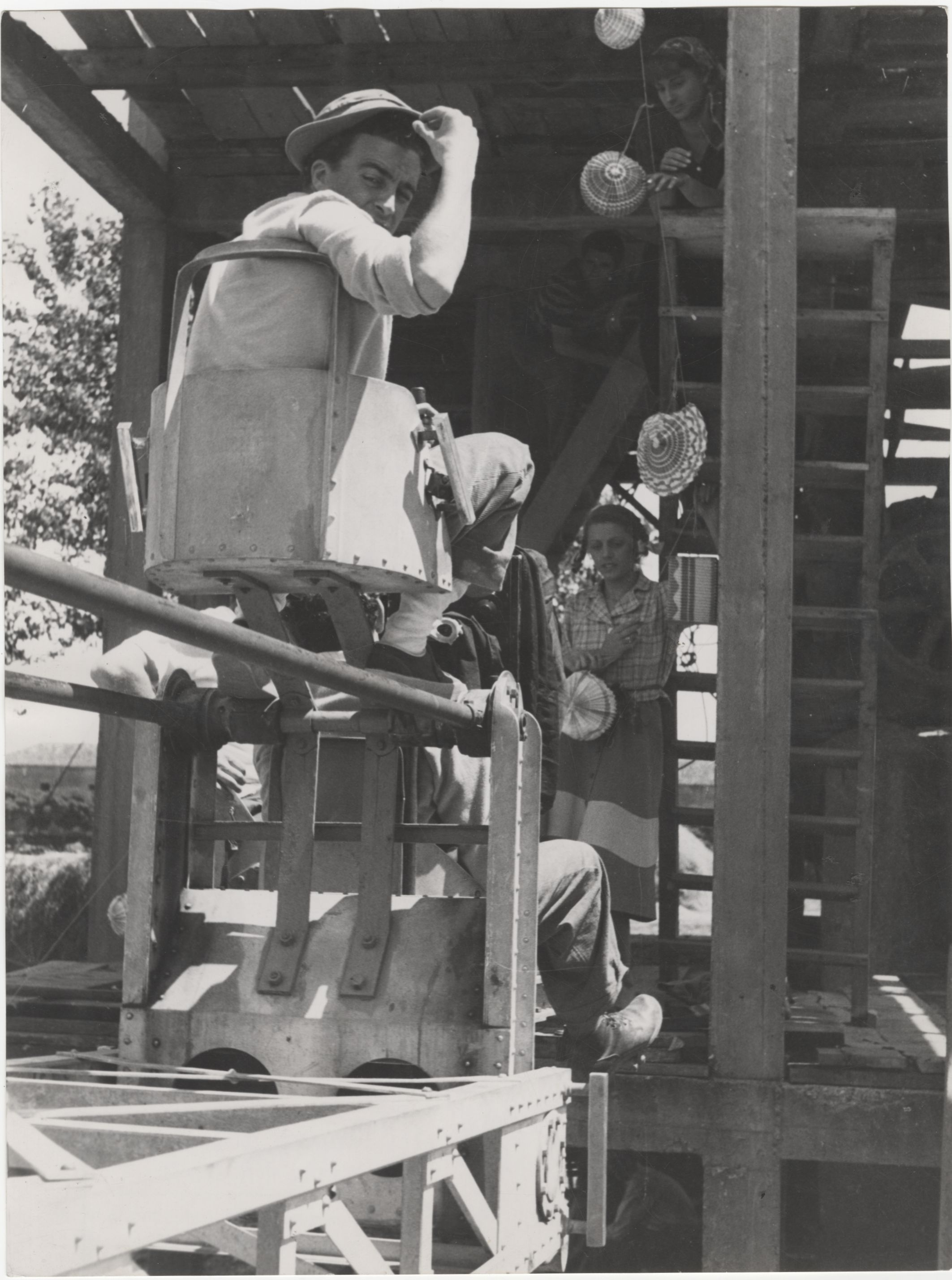
Director Giuseppe De Santis during the filming of a scene

Bitter Rice was the first credited role of actress Silvana Mangano. Prior to this, she had only appeared in a handful of uncredited parts. Director Giuseppe De Santis had sought an "Italian Rita Hayworth" for the role, and his first choice was Lucia Bosè. It was also the debut for Raf Vallone, who at the time was a writer for L'Unità. Mangano's voice was dubbed by Lydia Simoneschi, though she still uses her own singing voice.

The film was shot on location in the countryside of Vercellese. The main locations are Cascina Selve in Salasco and Tenuta Veneria in Lignana. The film's sets were designed by the art director Carlo Egidi.

Mario Monicelli worked on the film as an uncredited script doctor.

== Release ==
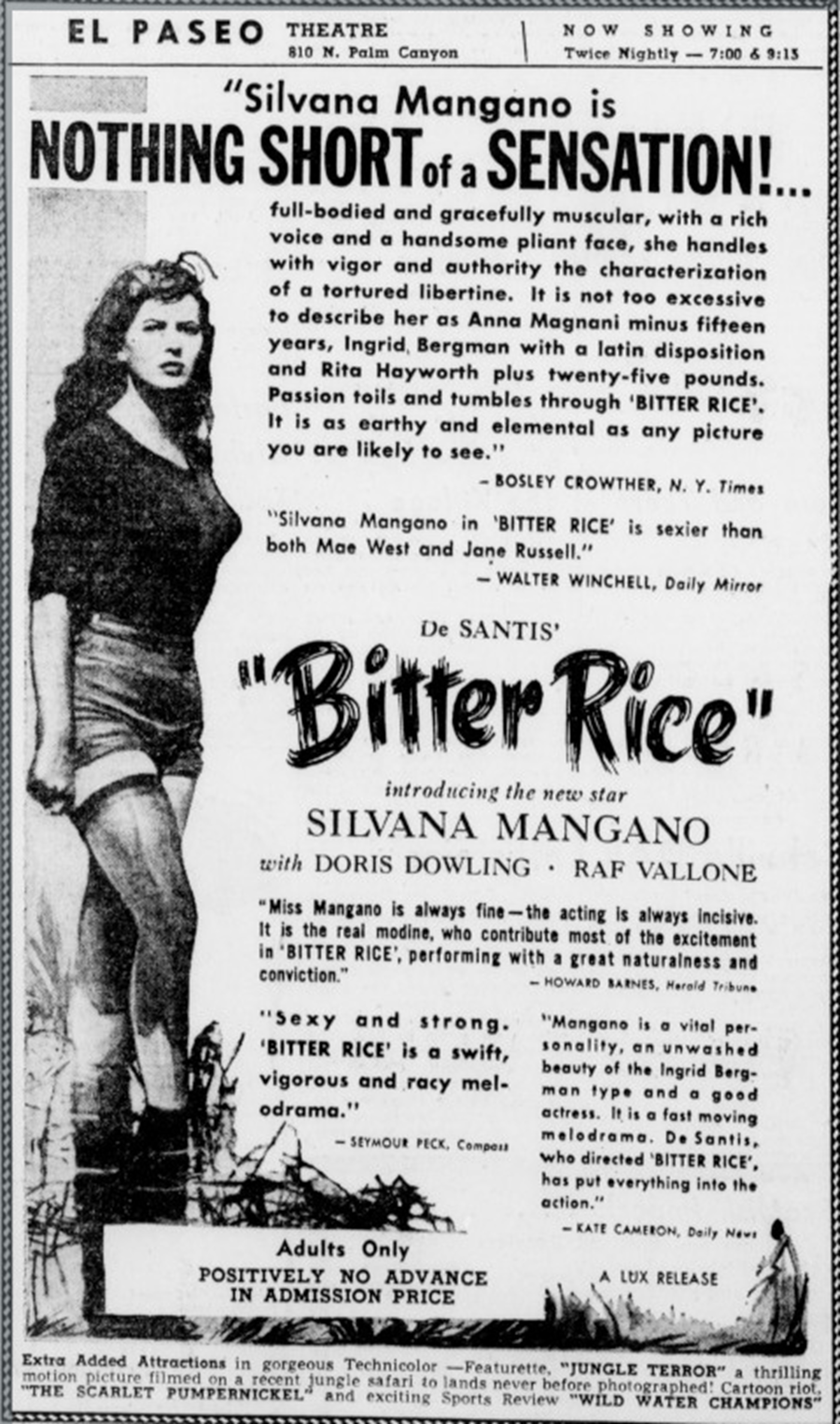
U.S theatrical advertisement, 9 February 1951

The film premiered at the 1949 Cannes Film Festival, where it was a finalist for the Palme d'Or. It was theatrically released in Italy on September 30, 1949.

== Awards and honors ==
The film was nominated for Best Story in the 1950 Academy Awards.

The film was also selected as one of 100 Italian films to be saved, a collection of films that "changed the collective memory of the country between 1942 and 1978". The collection was established by the Venice Film Festival in collaboration with Cinecittà and curated by Fabio Ferzetti, with input from Gianni Amelio and other Italian film critics. Many of the films selected represent the "Golden Age" of Italian cinema, which was manifested in the neorealist movement.

Cannes nomination

Bitter Rice was nominated for the Palme d'Or at the 1949 Cannes Film Festival, marking its early international recognition.

Inclusion in 100 Italian films to be saved

In 2008, the film was included in the Italian Ministry of Cultural Heritage’s list of 100 Italian films to be saved, recognizing films that shaped Italy’s collective memory between 1942 and 1978.
