= Tronzano Vercellese =

- Comune
- Comune di Tronzano Vercellese
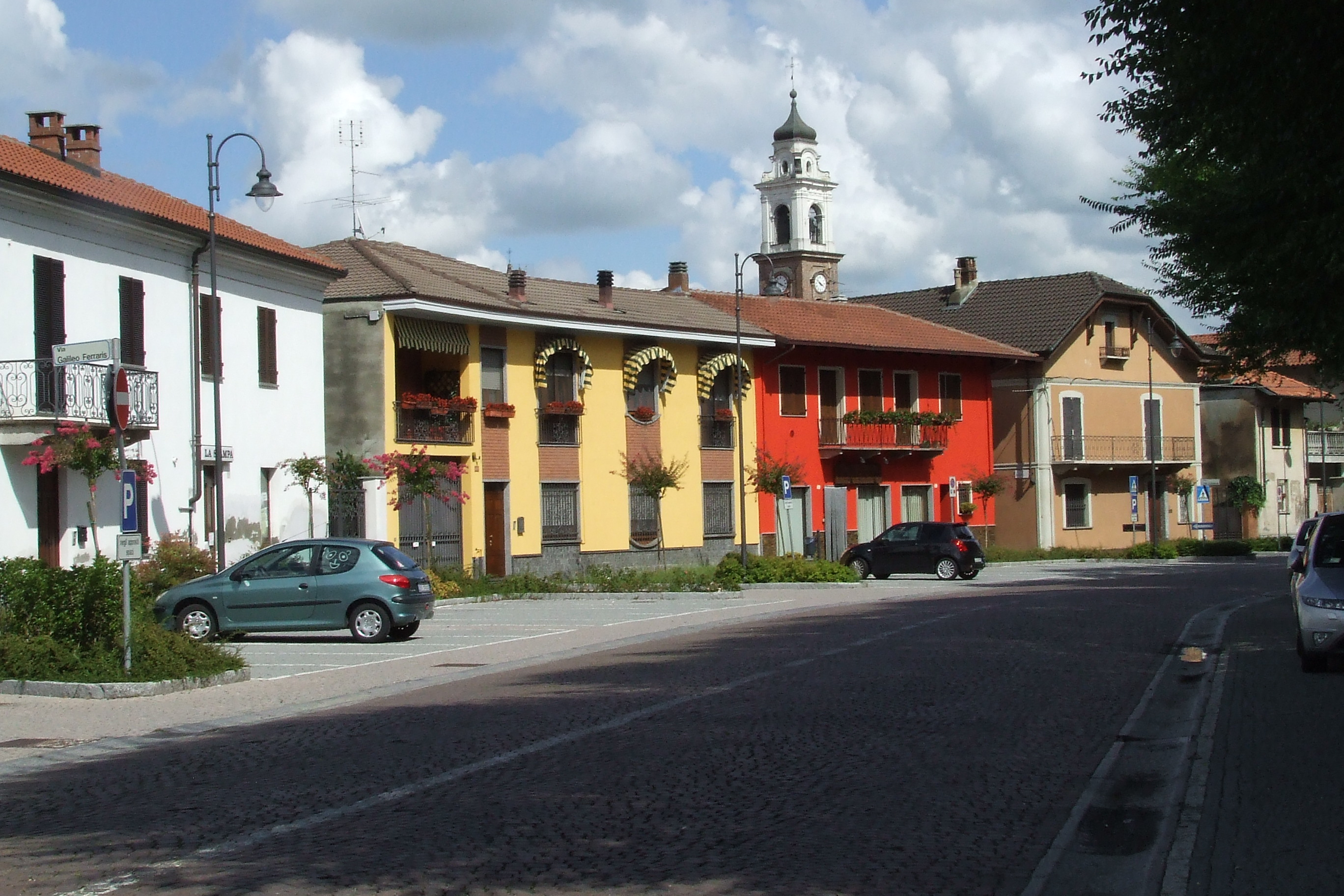

- Coat of arms

- Location within Italy Location within Piedmont
- Coordinates: 45°21′N 8°10′E
- Country: Italy
- Region: Piedmont
- Province: Vercelli (VC)
- Frazioni: Salomino

Government
  - Mayor: Andrea Chemello

Area
  - Total: 44.75 km^{2} (17.28 sq mi)
- Elevation: 182 m (597 ft)

Population (Dec. 2004)
  - Total: 3,519
  - Density: 78.64/km^{2} (203.7/sq mi)
- Demonym: Tronzanesi
- Time zone: UTC+1 (CET)
  - Summer (DST): UTC+2 (CEST)
- Postal code: 13049
- Dialing code: 0161
- Website: Official website

Tronzano Vercellese (Tronsan in Piedmontese) is a comune (municipality) in the Province of Vercelli in the Italian region Piedmont, located about 50 kilometres (31 mi) northeast of Turin and about 20 kilometres (12 mi) west of Vercelli.

Tronzano Vercellese borders the following municipalities: Alice Castello, Bianzè, Borgo d'Ale, Crova, Ronsecco, San Germano Vercellese, and Santhià.

== Twin towns ==
Tronzano Vercellese is twinned with:

- Eyguières, France
