= Pertengo =

- Comune
- Comune di Pertengo
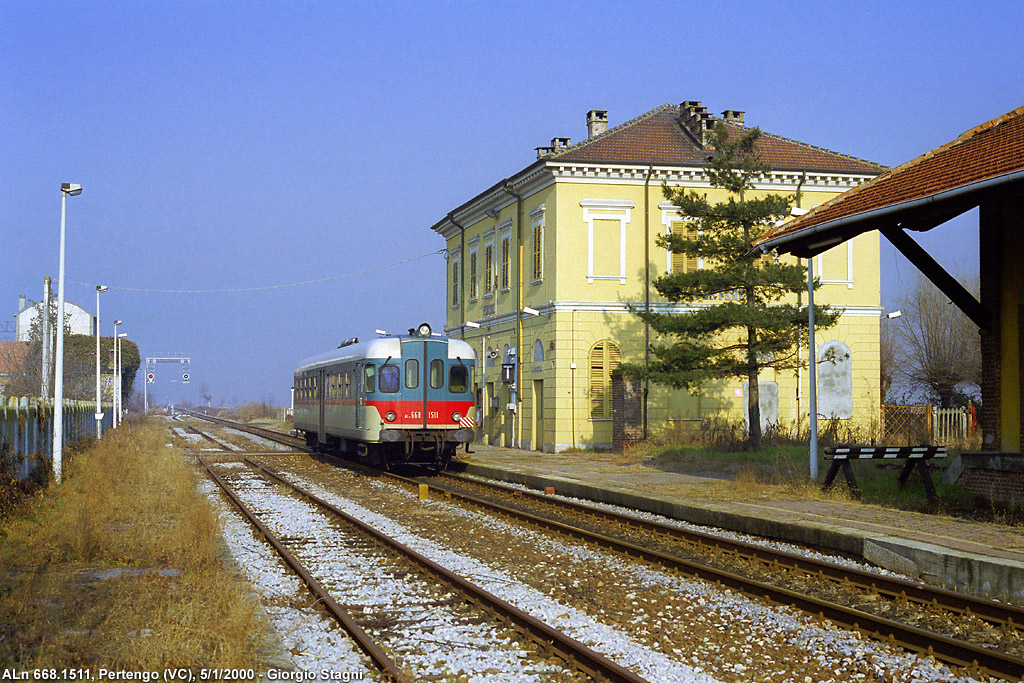

- Location within Italy Location within Piedmont
- Coordinates: 45°14′N 8°25′E
- Country: Italy
- Region: Piedmont
- Province: Vercelli (VC)

Government
  - Mayor: Anna Talpo

Area
  - Total: 8.3 km^{2} (3.2 sq mi)
- Elevation: 122 m (400 ft)

Population (Dec. 2004)
  - Total: 328
  - Density: 40/km^{2} (100/sq mi)
- Demonym: Pertenghesi
- Time zone: UTC+1 (CET)
  - Summer (DST): UTC+2 (CEST)
- Postal code: 13030
- Dialing code: 0161
- Website: Official website

Pertengo is a comune (municipality) in the Province of Vercelli in the Italian region Piedmont, located about 60 kilometres (37 mi) northeast of Turin and about 9 kilometres (6 mi) south of Vercelli.

Pertengo borders the following municipalities: Asigliano Vercellese, Costanzana, Rive, and Stroppiana.
