= Giovanni Barberis =

Italian footballer

Personal information
- Date of birth: 25 April 1915
- Place of birth: Stroppiana, Italy
- Height: 1.70 m (5 ft 7 in)
- Position: Midfielder

Senior career*
Years	Team	Apps	(Gls)
1933–1936	Pro Vercelli	46	(6)
1936–1937	Juventus	5	(0)
1937–1941	Pro Patria		
- * Club domestic league appearances and goals

Giovanni Barberis (born 25 April 1915 in Stroppiana) was an Italian football player.
