= Stroppiana =

- Comune
- Comune di Stroppiana

- Location within Italy Location within Piedmont
- Coordinates: 45°13′N 8°27′E
- Country: Italy
- Region: Piedmont
- Province: Vercelli (VC)

Government
  - Mayor: Maria Grazia Ennas

Area
  - Total: 18.1 km^{2} (7.0 sq mi)
- Elevation: 119 m (390 ft)

Population (Dec. 2004)
  - Total: 1,201
  - Density: 66.4/km^{2} (172/sq mi)
- Demonym: Stroppianesi
- Time zone: UTC+1 (CET)
  - Summer (DST): UTC+2 (CEST)
- Postal code: 13010
- Dialing code: 0161
- Website: Official website

Stroppiana is a comune (municipality) in the Province of Vercelli in the Italian region Piedmont, located about 60 kilometres (37 mi) northeast of Turin and about 10 kilometres (6 mi) southeast of Vercelli.

Stroppiana borders the following municipalities: Asigliano Vercellese, Caresana, Pertengo, Pezzana, Rive, and Villanova Monferrato.

== Notable people ==
- Giovanni Barberis
