= Ronsecco =

- Comune
- Comune di Ronsecco
- Location within Italy Location within Piedmont
- Coordinates: 45°15′N 8°17′E
- Country: Italy
- Region: Piedmont
- Province: Province of Vercelli (VC)

Area
  - Total: 24.5 km^{2} (9.5 sq mi)

Population (Dec. 2004)
  - Total: 606
  - Density: 24.7/km^{2} (64.1/sq mi)
- Time zone: UTC+1 (CET)
  - Summer (DST): UTC+2 (CEST)
- Postal code: 13036
- Dialing code: 0161

Ronsecco (Ronsuch in Piedmontese) is a comune (municipality) in the Province of Vercelli in the Italian region Piedmont, located about 50 kilometres (31 mi) northeast of Turin and about 13 kilometres (8 mi) southwest of Vercelli. As of 31 December 2004, it had a population of 606 and an area of 24.5 square kilometres (9.5 mi^{2}).

Ronsecco borders the following municipalities: Bianzè, Crova, Desana, Lignana, Tricerro, Trino, and Tronzano Vercellese.

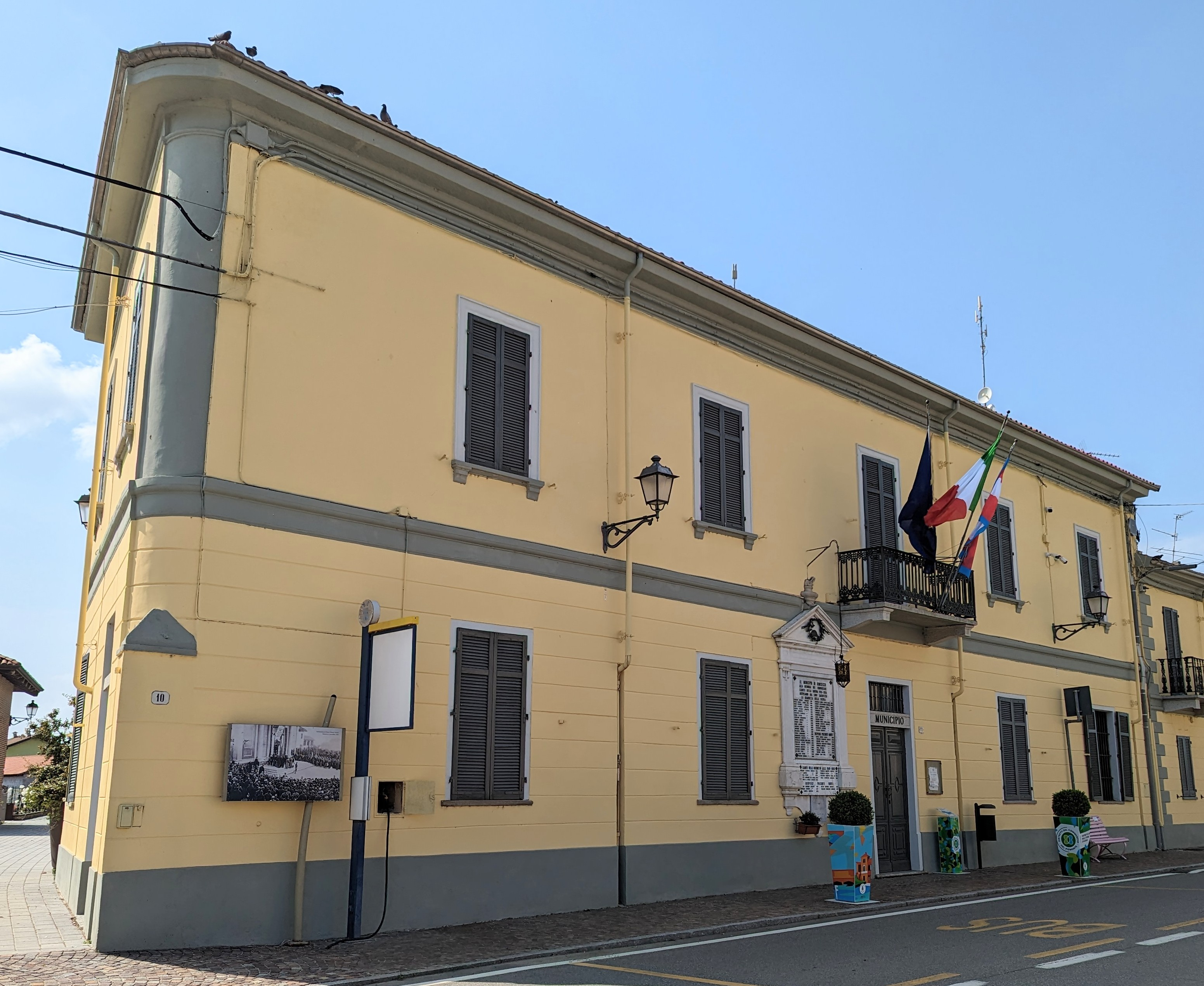
Municipio di Ronsecco

== Demographic evolution ==
Historical population

Year	Pop.	±%
1861	1,531	—
1871	1,691	+10.5%
1881	1,877	+11.0%
1901	2,390	+27.3%
1911	2,026	−15.2%

Year	Pop.	±%
1921	1,903	−6.1%
1931	1,924	+1.1%
1936	1,859	−3.4%
1951	1,694	−8.9%
1961	1,278	−24.6%

Year	Pop.	±%
1971	943	−26.2%
1981	742	−21.3%
1991	673	−9.3%
2001	616	−8.5%

Source: Data from ISTAT
