= Pezzana =

- Comune
- Comune di Pezzana
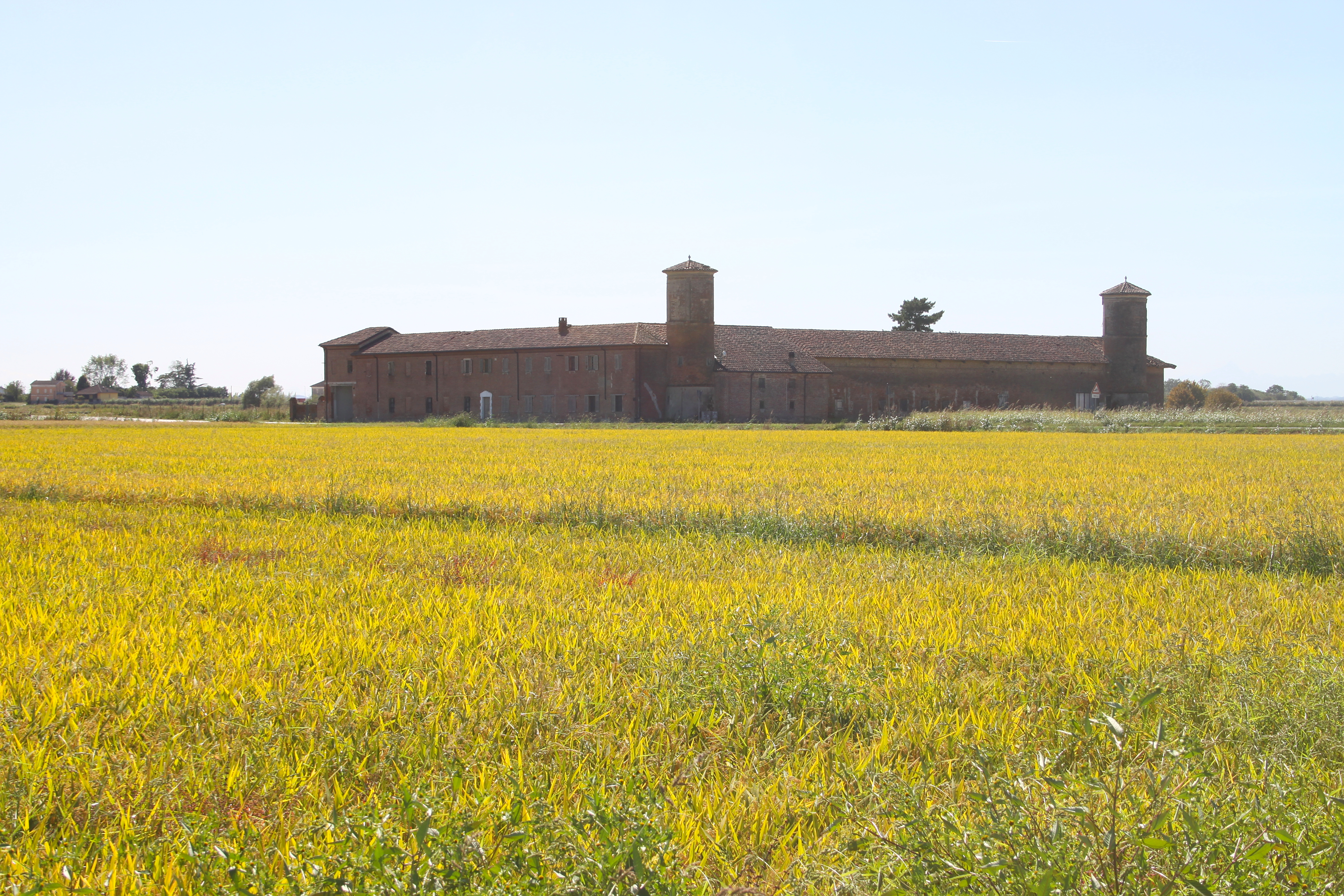

- Coat of arms

- Location within Italy Location within Piedmont
- Coordinates: 45°16′N 8°29′E
- Country: Italy
- Region: Piedmont
- Province: Vercelli (VC)

Government
  - Mayor: Giuseppe Trecate

Area
  - Total: 17.4 km^{2} (6.7 sq mi)

Population (Dec. 2004)
  - Total: 1,146
  - Density: 65.9/km^{2} (171/sq mi)
- Demonym: Pezzanesi
- Time zone: UTC+1 (CET)
  - Summer (DST): UTC+2 (CEST)
- Postal code: 13010
- Dialing code: 0161
- Patron saint: St. Eusebius of Vercelli
- Saint day: August 2

Pezzana (Piedmontese: Psan-a) is a comune (municipality) of about 1,000 inhabitants in the Province of Vercelli in the Italian region Piedmont, located about 70 kilometres (43 mi) northeast of Turin and about 8 kilometres (5 mi) southeast of Vercelli.

Pezzana borders the following municipalities: Asigliano Vercellese, Caresana, Palestro, Prarolo, Rosasco, and Stroppiana.

== Demographic evolution ==
Historical population

Year	Pop.	±%
1861	2,552	—
1871	2,942	+15.3%
1881	3,407	+15.8%
1901	3,710	+8.9%
1911	3,441	−7.3%
1921	2,880	−16.3%

Year	Pop.	±%
1931	2,497	−13.3%
1936	2,431	−2.6%
1951	2,081	−14.4%
1961	1,667	−19.9%
1971	1,291	−22.6%
1981	1,116	−13.6%

Year	Pop.	±%
1991	1,087	−2.6%
2001	1,129	+3.9%
2011	1,346	+19.2%
2021	1,271	−5.6%

Source: Data from ISTAT
