= Casanova Elvo =

- Comune
- Comune di Casanova Elvo
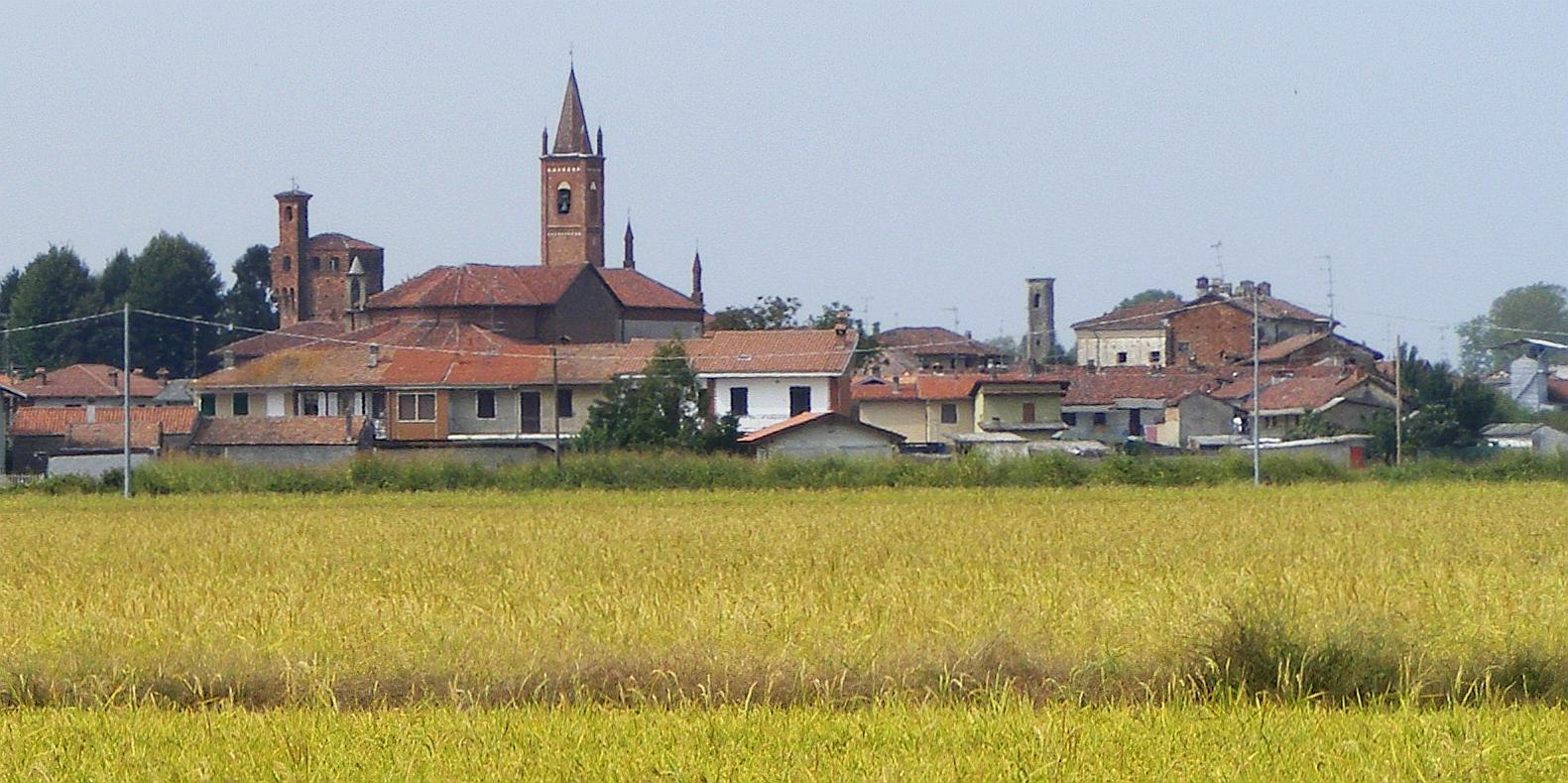

- Location within Italy Location within Piedmont
- Coordinates: 45°24′N 8°18′E
- Country: Italy
- Region: Piedmont
- Province: Vercelli (VC)

Government
  - Mayor: Giorgio Gallina

Area
  - Total: 16.3 km^{2} (6.3 sq mi)
- Elevation: 152 m (499 ft)

Population (31 December 2010)
  - Total: 275
  - Density: 16.9/km^{2} (43.7/sq mi)
- Demonym: Casanoelvesi
- Time zone: UTC+1 (CET)
  - Summer (DST): UTC+2 (CEST)
- Postal code: 13030
- Dialing code: 0161

Casanova Elvo is a comune (municipality) in the Province of Vercelli in the Italian region Piedmont, located about 60 kilometres (37 mi) northeast of Turin and about 13 kilometres (8 mi) northwest of Vercelli.

Casanova Elvo borders the following municipalities: Collobiano, Formigliana, Olcenengo, San Germano Vercellese, Santhià, and Villarboit.
