= Collobiano =

- Comune
- Comune di Collobiano
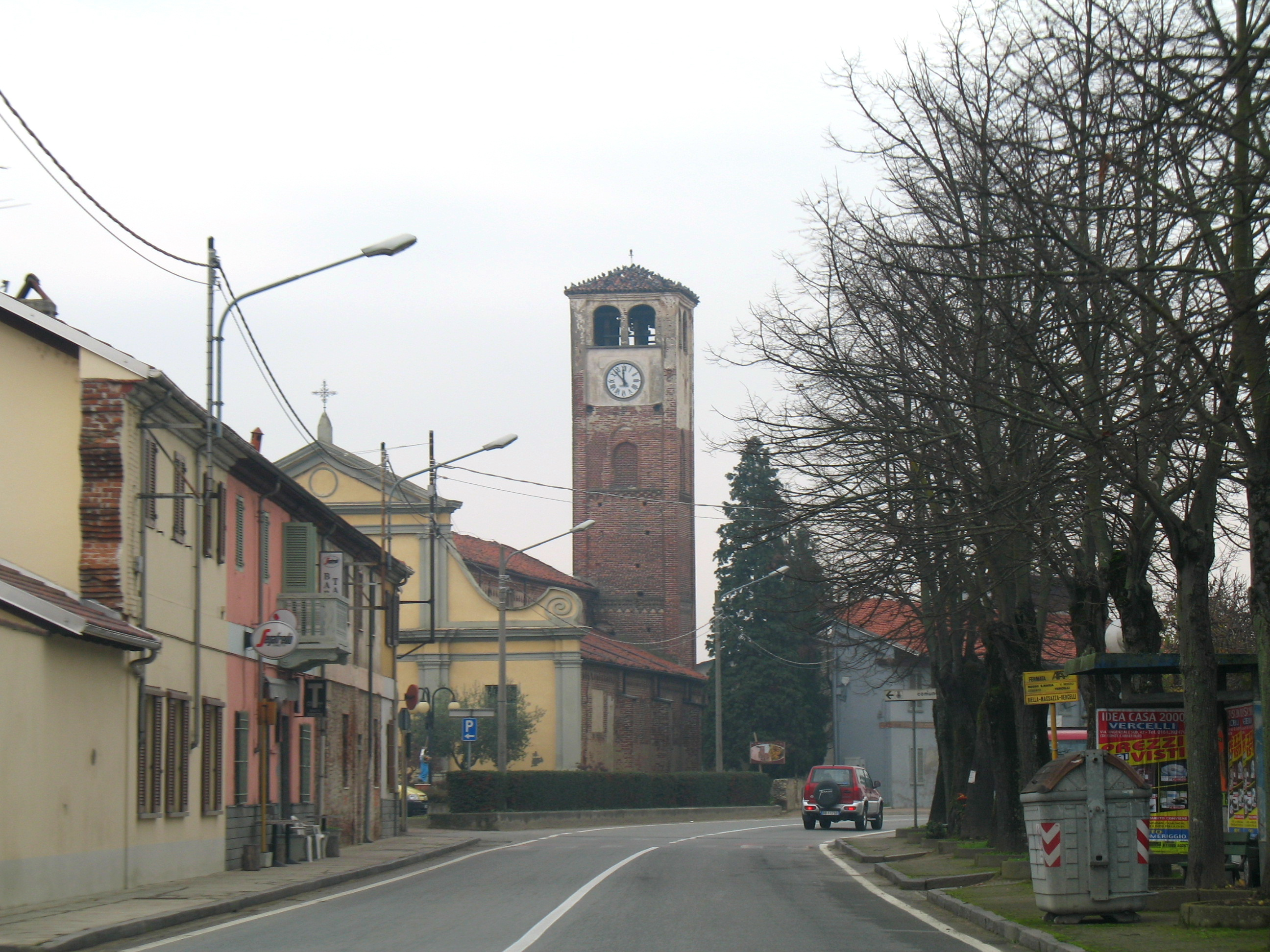

- Coat of arms

- Location within Italy Location within Piedmont
- Coordinates: 45°24′N 8°21′E
- Country: Italy
- Region: Piedmont
- Province: Vercelli (VC)

Government
  - Mayor: Claudia Mognato

Area
  - Total: 9.22 km^{2} (3.56 sq mi)
- Elevation: 143 m (469 ft)

Population (Dec. 2004)
  - Total: 126
  - Density: 13.7/km^{2} (35.4/sq mi)
- Demonym: Collobianesi
- Time zone: UTC+1 (CET)
  - Summer (DST): UTC+2 (CEST)
- Postal code: 13030
- Dialing code: 0161
- Website: Official website

Collobiano is a comune (municipality) in the Province of Vercelli in the Italian region Piedmont, located about 60 kilometres (37 mi) northeast of Turin and about 11 kilometres (7 mi) northwest of Vercelli.

Collobiano borders the following municipalities: Albano Vercellese, Casanova Elvo, Olcenengo, Oldenico, Quinto Vercellese, and Villarboit.
