= Rive, Piedmont =

Rive
- Comune
- Comune di Rive
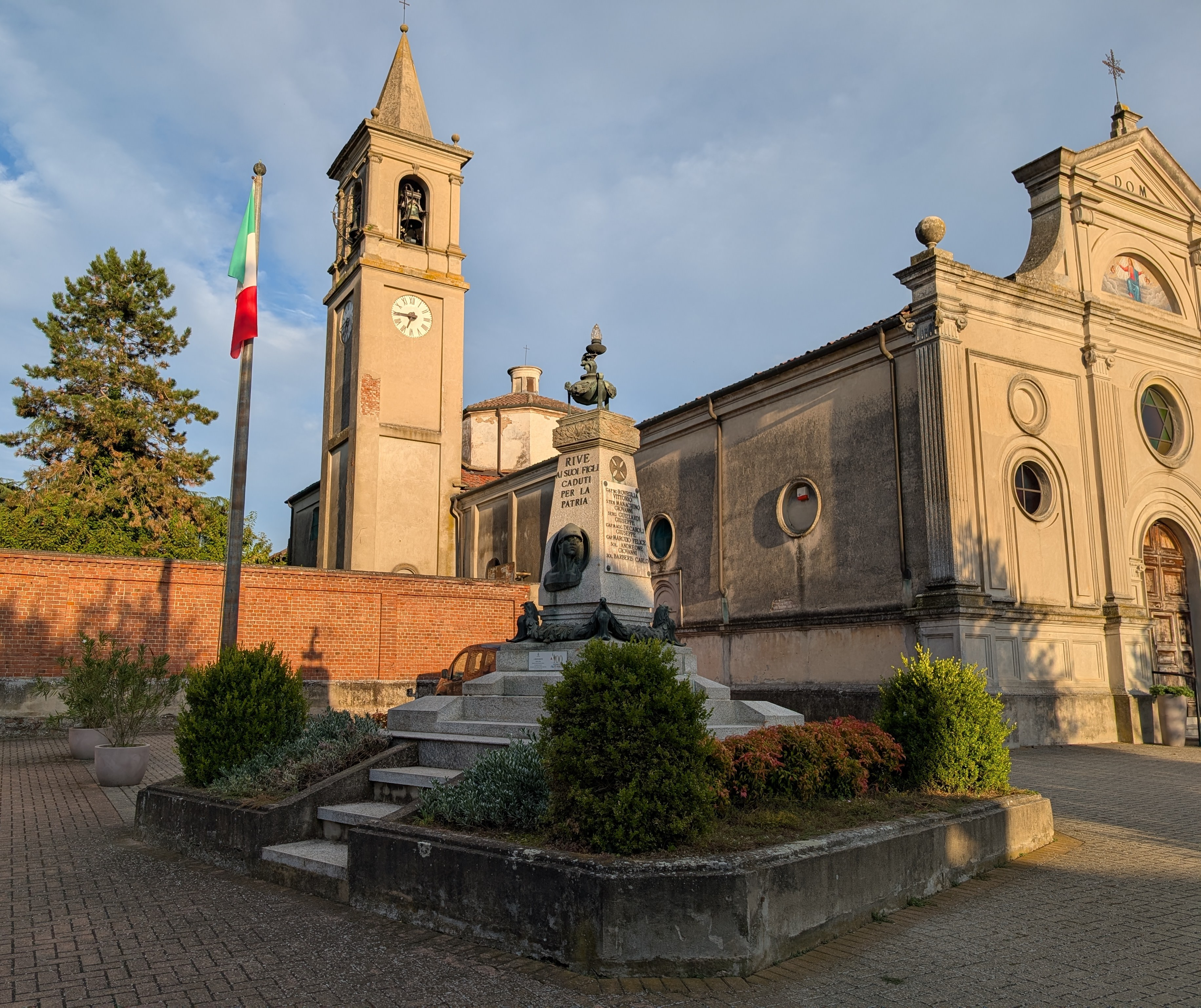

- Location within Italy Location within Piedmont
- Coordinates: 45°13′N 8°25′E
- Country: Italy
- Region: Piedmont
- Province: Province of Vercelli (VC)

Government
  - Mayor: Manachino Andrea

Area
  - Total: 9.5 km^{2} (3.7 sq mi)
- Elevation: 126 m (413 ft)

Population (Dec. 2004)
  - Total: 426
  - Density: 45/km^{2} (120/sq mi)
- Time zone: UTC+1 (CET)
  - Summer (DST): UTC+2 (CEST)
- Postal code: 13030
- Dialing code: 0161

Rive is a comune (municipality) in the Province of Vercelli in the Italian region Piedmont, located about 60 kilometres (37 mi) northeast of Turin and about 11 kilometres (7 mi) south of Vercelli. As of 31 December 2004, it had a population of 426 and an area of 9.5 square kilometres (3.7 mi^{2}).

Rive borders the following municipalities: Balzola, Costanzana, Pertengo, Stroppiana, and Villanova Monferrato.

== Demographic evolution ==
Historical population

Year	Pop.	±%
1861	1,113	—
1871	1,291	+16.0%
1881	1,340	+3.8%
1901	1,502	+12.1%
1911	1,454	−3.2%

Year	Pop.	±%
1921	1,262	−13.2%
1931	1,186	−6.0%
1936	1,124	−5.2%
1951	969	−13.8%
1961	786	−18.9%

Year	Pop.	±%
1971	626	−20.4%
1981	457	−27.0%
1991	385	−15.8%
2001	417	+8.3%

Source: Data from ISTAT
