= Tricerro =

- Comune
- Comune di Tricerro
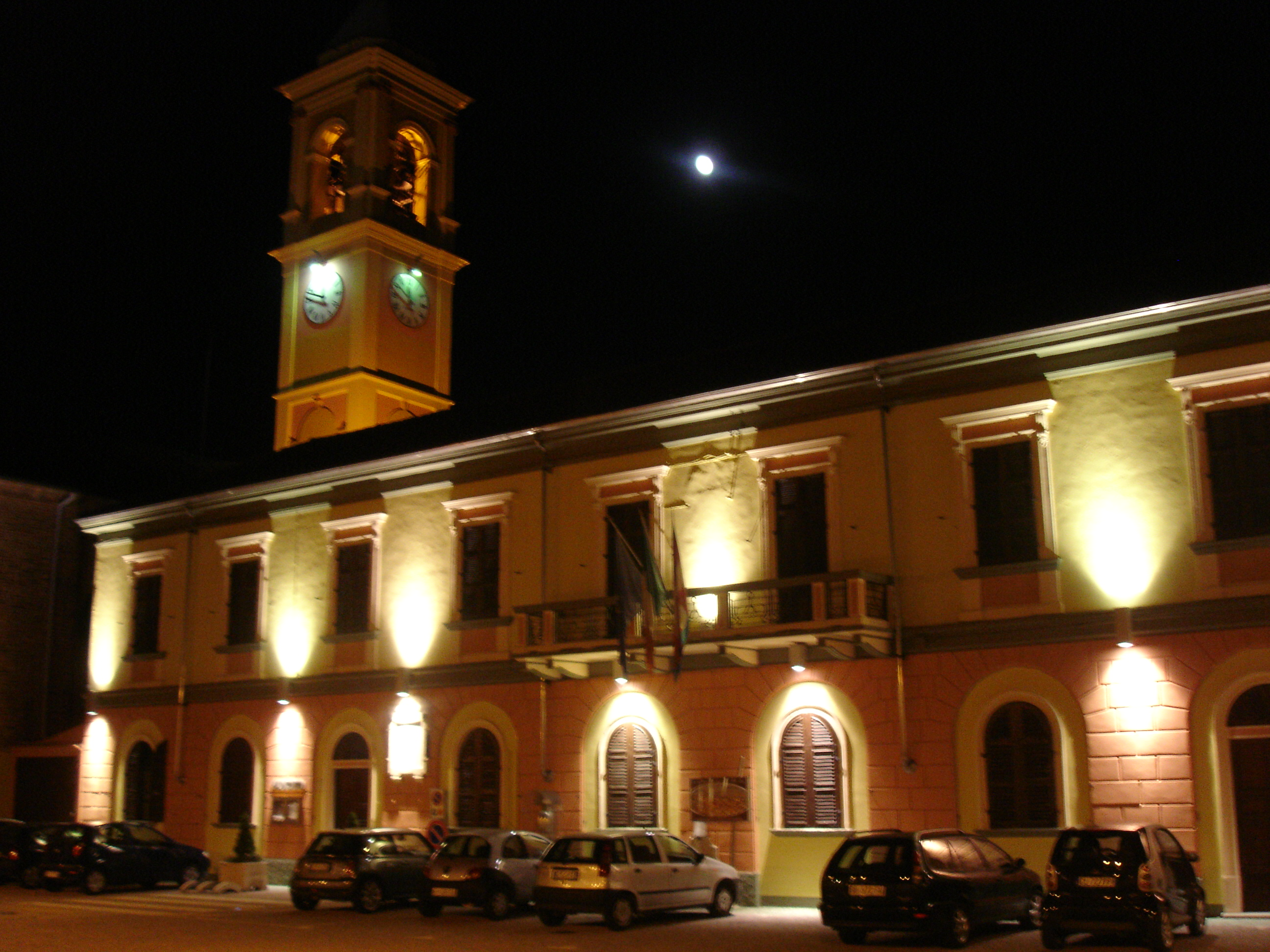
- Town hall.

- Location within Italy Location within Piedmont
- Coordinates: 45°14′N 8°20′E
- Country: Italy
- Region: Piedmont
- Province: Vercelli (VC)

Government
  - Mayor: Carlo Borgo

Area
  - Total: 12.2 km^{2} (4.7 sq mi)
- Elevation: 141 m (463 ft)

Population (Dec. 2004)
  - Total: 627
  - Density: 51.4/km^{2} (133/sq mi)
- Demonym: Tricerresi
- Time zone: UTC+1 (CET)
  - Summer (DST): UTC+2 (CEST)
- Postal code: 13038
- Dialing code: 0161
- Website: Official website

Tricerro (Trisser in Piedmontese) is a comune (municipality) in the Province of Vercelli in the Italian region Piedmont, located about 50 kilometres (31 mi) northeast of Turin and about 11 kilometres (7 mi) southwest of Vercelli.

Tricerro borders the following municipalities: Costanzana, Desana, Ronsecco, and Trino.
