= Lignana =

- Comune
- Comune di Lignana
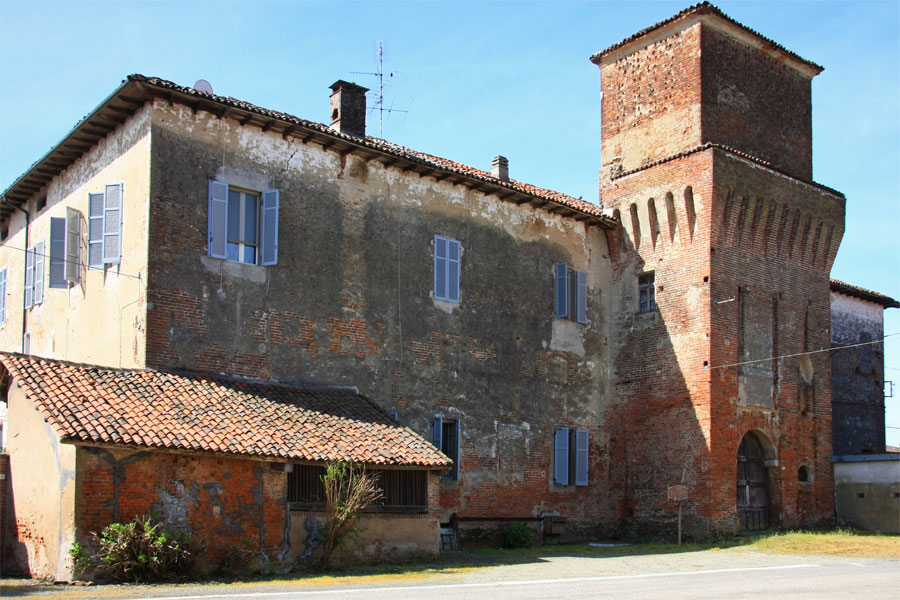

- Location within Italy Location within Piedmont
- Coordinates: 45°17′N 8°21′E
- Country: Italy
- Region: Piedmont
- Province: Vercelli (VC)
- Frazioni: Tenuta Veneria

Government
  - Mayor: Emilio Chiocchetti

Area
  - Total: 22.5 km^{2} (8.7 sq mi)
- Elevation: 139 m (456 ft)

Population (December 2004)
  - Total: 539
  - Density: 24.0/km^{2} (62.0/sq mi)
- Demonym: Lignanesi
- Time zone: UTC+1 (CET)
  - Summer (DST): UTC+2 (CEST)
- Postal code: 13030
- Dialing code: 0161
- Website: Official website

Lignana is a comune (municipality) in the Province of Vercelli in the Italian region Piedmont, located about 60 kilometres (37 mi) northeast of Turin and about 6 kilometres (4 mi) southwest of Vercelli.

Lignana borders the following municipalities: Crova, Desana, Ronsecco, Salasco, Sali Vercellese, and Vercelli.

Tenuta Veneria, together with Selve (frazione of the comune of Salasco), was a filming location for Bitter Rice, a 1949 movie starring Silvana Mangano.
