= Lamporo =

Lamporo Lampeu
- Comune
- Comune di Lamporo
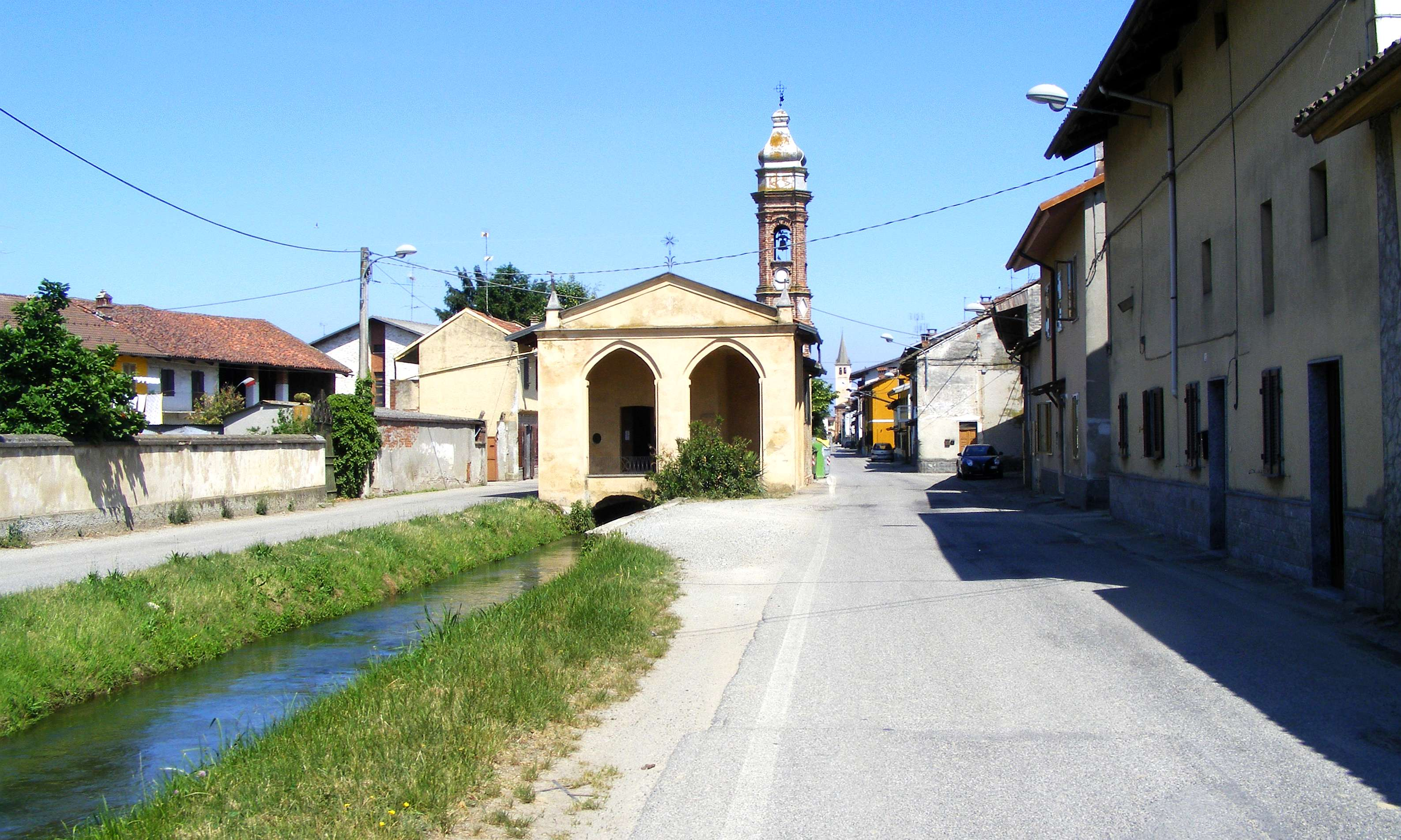

- Location within Italy Location within Piedmont
- Coordinates: 45°14′N 8°6′E
- Country: Italy
- Region: Piedmont
- Province: Province of Vercelli (VC)

Government
  - Mayor: Claudio Preti

Area
  - Total: 9.8 km^{2} (3.8 sq mi)
- Elevation: 165 m (541 ft)

Population (Dec. 2004)
  - Total: 515
  - Density: 53/km^{2} (140/sq mi)
- Demonym: Lamporesi
- Time zone: UTC+1 (CET)
  - Summer (DST): UTC+2 (CEST)
- Postal code: 13040
- Dialing code: 0161
- Website: Official website

Lamporo (Lampeu in Piedmontese) is a comune (municipality) in the Province of Vercelli in the Italian region Piedmont, located about 35 kilometres (22 mi) northeast of Turin and about 25 kilometres (16 mi) southwest of Vercelli. As of 31 December 2004, it had a population of 515 and an area of 9.8 square kilometres (3.8 mi^{2}).

Lamporo borders the following municipalities: Crescentino, Livorno Ferraris, and Saluggia.

== Demographic evolution ==
Historical population

| Year | Pop. | ±% |
|---|---|---|
| 1861 | 1,303 | — |
| 1871 | 1,378 | +5.8% |
| 1881 | 1,452 | +5.4% |
| 1901 | 1,542 | +6.2% |
| 1911 | 1,300 | −15.7% |

| Year | Pop. | ±% |
|---|---|---|
| 1921 | 1,108 | −14.8% |
| 1931 | 986 | −11.0% |
| 1936 | 981 | −0.5% |
| 1951 | 848 | −13.6% |
| 1961 | 743 | −12.4% |

| Year | Pop. | ±% |
|---|---|---|
| 1971 | 597 | −19.7% |
| 1981 | 504 | −15.6% |
| 1991 | 500 | −0.8% |
| 2001 | 522 | +4.4% |

Source: Data from ISTAT
