= Salasco =

- Comune
- Comune di Salasco
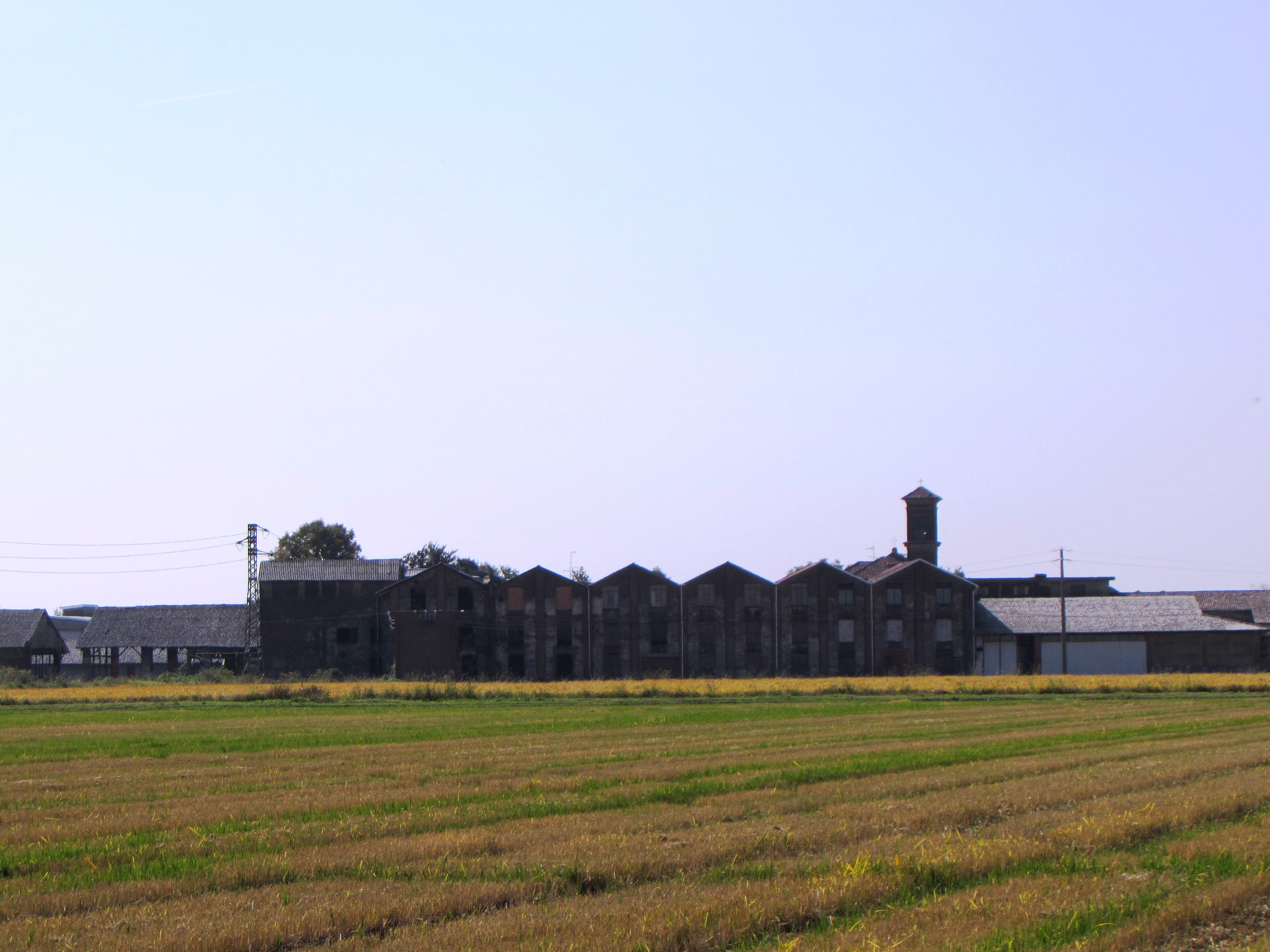
- A view of the frazione Selve.

- Location within Italy Location within Piedmont
- Coordinates: 45°20′N 8°16′E
- Country: Italy
- Region: Piedmont
- Province: Vercelli (VC)
- Frazioni: Selve

Government
  - Mayor: Doriano Bertolone

Area
  - Total: 12.1 km^{2} (4.7 sq mi)
- Elevation: 148 m (486 ft)

Population (December 2004)
  - Total: 240
  - Density: 20/km^{2} (51/sq mi)
- Demonym: Salaschesi
- Time zone: UTC+1 (CET)
  - Summer (DST): UTC+2 (CEST)
- Postal code: 13040
- Dialing code: 0161
- Patron saint: Saint James the Greater
- Website: Official website

Salasco is a comune (municipality) in the Province of Vercelli in the Italian region Piedmont, located about 50 kilometres (31 mi) northeast of Turin and about 12 kilometres (7.5 mi) west of Vercelli.

The municipality of Salasco contains the frazione Selve, a typical cascina a corte of the Vercellese rice paddy fields landscape.

Salasco borders the following municipalities: Crova, Lignana, Sali Vercellese, San Germano Vercellese, and Vercelli.

Selve, together with the nearby Tenuta Veneria (comune of Lignana), was a filming location for Bitter Rice, a 1949 neorealistic movie starring Silvana Mangano and Vittorio Gassman.
