= Crova =

- Comune
- Comune di Crova
- Location within Italy Location within Piedmont
- Coordinates: 45°20′N 8°13′E
- Country: Italy
- Region: Piedmont
- Province: Province of Vercelli (VC)
- Frazioni: Viancino

Area
  - Total: 14.2 km^{2} (5.5 sq mi)
- Elevation: 167 m (548 ft)

Population (Dec. 2004)
  - Total: 431
  - Density: 30.4/km^{2} (78.6/sq mi)
- Demonym: Crovatin
- Time zone: UTC+1 (CET)
  - Summer (DST): UTC+2 (CEST)
- Postal code: 13040
- Dialing code: 0161

Crova is a comune (municipality) in the Province of Vercelli in the Italian region Piedmont, located about 50 kilometres (31 mi) northeast of Turin and about 15 kilometres (9 mi) west of Vercelli. As of 31 December 2004, it had a population of 431 and an area of 14.2 square kilometres (5.5 mi^{2}).

The municipality of Crova contains the frazioni (subdivisions, mainly villages and hamlets) Viancino and it borders the following municipalities: Lignana, Ronsecco, Salasco, San Germano Vercellese, Santhià, and Tronzano Vercellese.

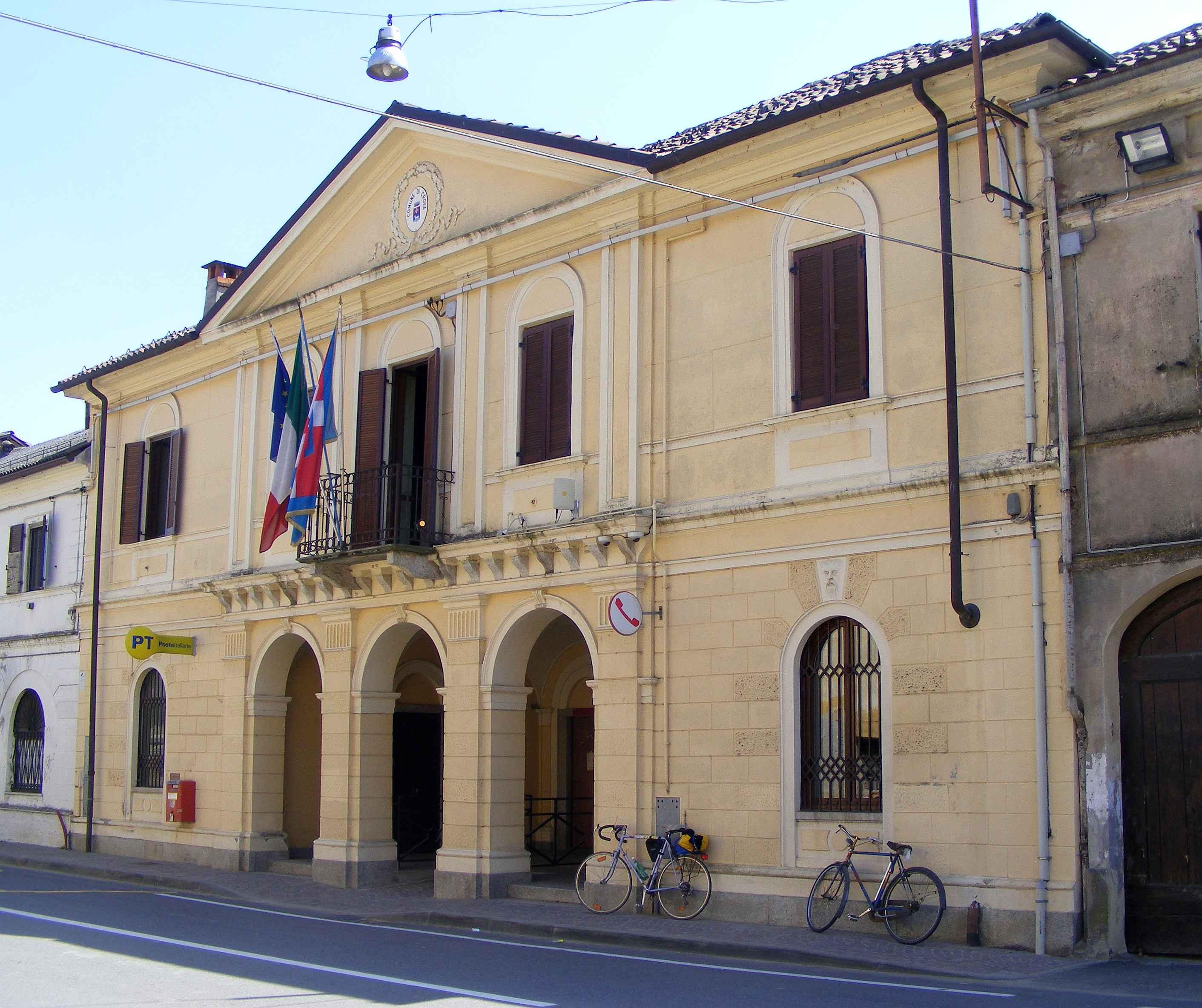
Crova town hall

== Demographic evolution ==
Historical population

Year	Pop.	±%
1861	1,353	—
1871	1,529	+13.0%
1881	1,757	+14.9%
1901	1,608	−8.5%
1911	1,493	−7.2%

Year	Pop.	±%
1921	1,316	−11.9%
1931	1,218	−7.4%
1936	1,286	+5.6%
1951	1,176	−8.6%
1961	982	−16.5%

Year	Pop.	±%
1971	687	−30.0%
1981	486	−29.3%
1991	472	−2.9%
2001	429	−9.1%

Source: Data from ISTAT
