= Cigliano =

- Comune
- Comune di Cigliano
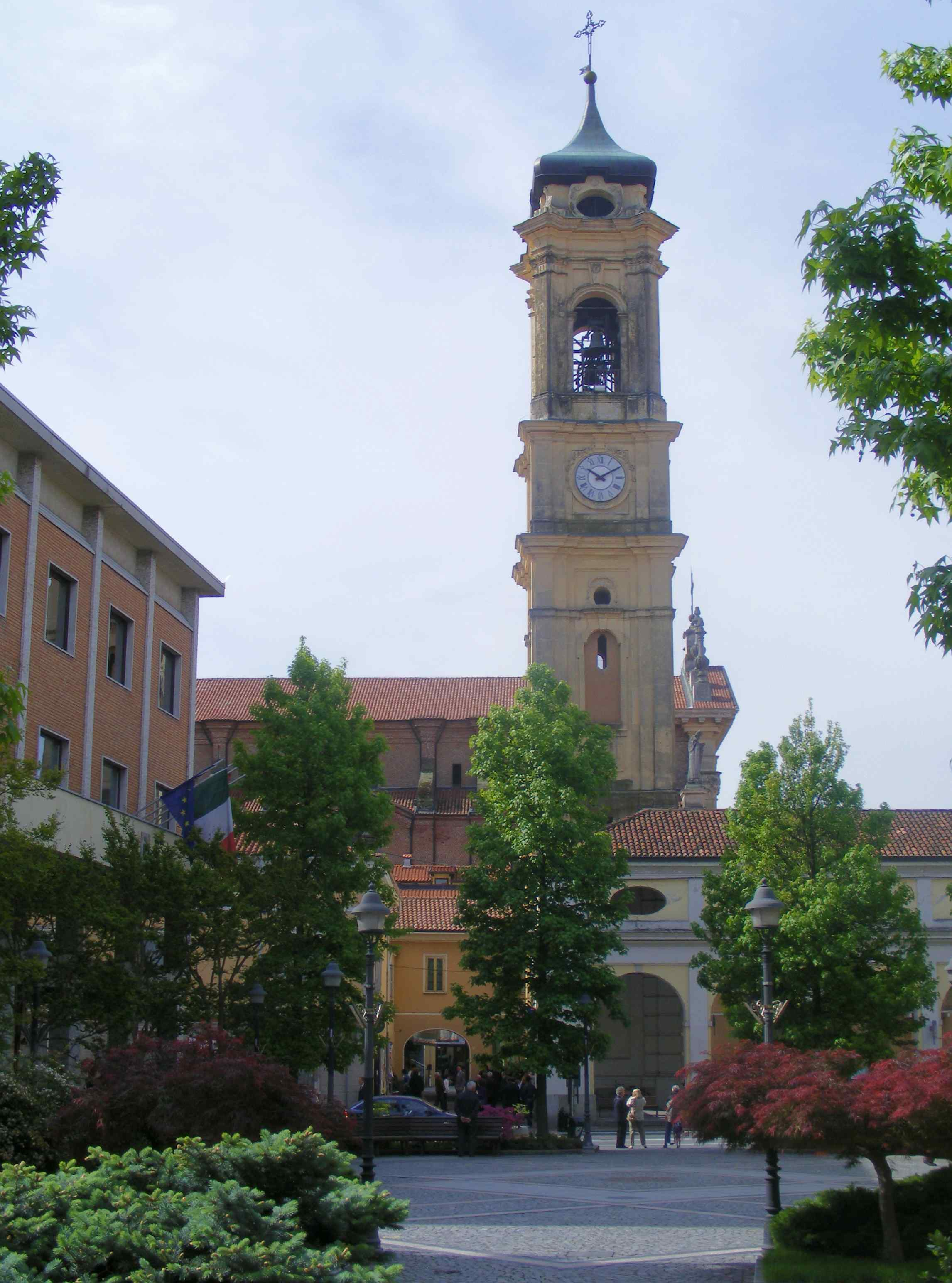

- Coat of arms

- Location within Italy Location within Piedmont
- Coordinates: 45°19′N 8°1′E
- Country: Italy
- Region: Piedmont
- Province: Vercelli (VC)
- Frazioni: Olmetto, Ronchi, Petiva

Government
  - Mayor: Anna Rigazio

Area
  - Total: 25.31 km^{2} (9.77 sq mi)
- Elevation: 180 m (590 ft)

Population (30 June 2017)
  - Total: 4,545
  - Density: 179.6/km^{2} (465.1/sq mi)
- Demonym: Ciglianesi
- Time zone: UTC+1 (CET)
  - Summer (DST): UTC+2 (CEST)
- Postal code: 13043
- Dialing code: 0161
- Website: Official website

Cigliano is a comune (municipality) in the Province of Vercelli in the Italian region Piedmont, located about 35 kilometres (22 mi) northeast of Turin and about 30 kilometres (19 mi) west of Vercelli.

== Notable people ==
Pietro "Peter" Bollea (1886-1960), the paternal grandfather of the famous wrestler Hulk Hogan, came from Cigliano.
