= Sali Vercellese =

- Comune
- Comune di Sali Vercellese
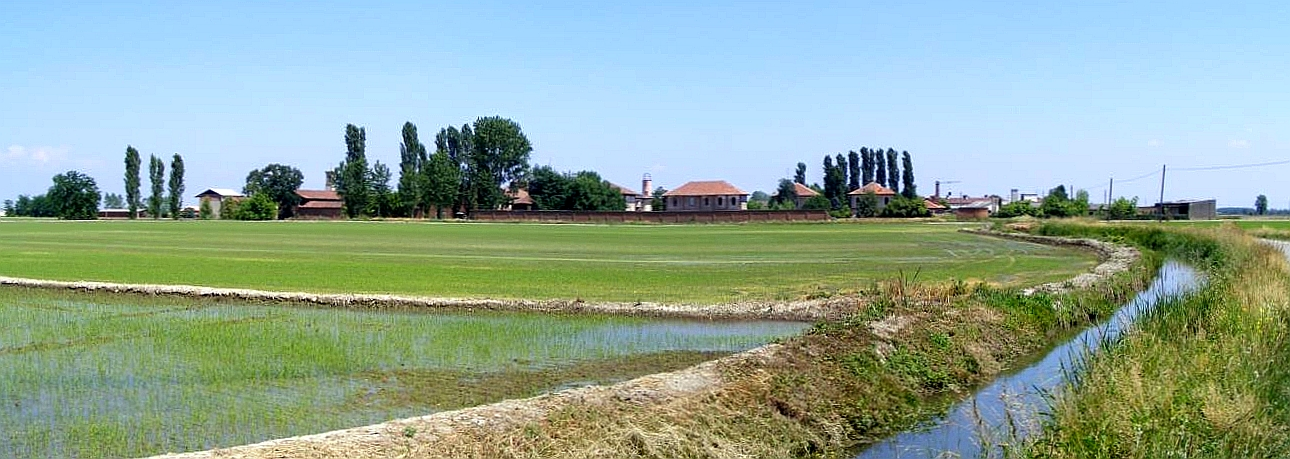

- Location within Italy Location within Piedmont
- Coordinates: 45°17′N 8°21′E
- Country: Italy
- Region: Piedmont
- Province: Vercelli (VC)

Government
  - Mayor: Emanuele Gabutti

Area
  - Total: 8.78 km^{2} (3.39 sq mi)
- Elevation: 139 m (456 ft)

Population (Dec. 2004)
  - Total: 128
  - Density: 14.6/km^{2} (37.8/sq mi)
- Demonym: Salesi
- Time zone: UTC+1 (CET)
  - Summer (DST): UTC+2 (CEST)
- Postal code: 13040
- Dialing code: 0161
- Patron saint: St. Desiderius
- Saint day: 23 May
- Website: Official website

Sali Vercellese is a comune (municipality) in the Province of Vercelli in the Italian region Piedmont, located about 60 kilometres (37 mi) northeast of Turin and about 6 kilometres (4 mi) southwest of Vercelli.

Sali Vercellese borders the following municipalities: Lignana, Salasco, and Vercelli.
