= Quinto Vercellese =

- Comune
- Comune di Quinto Vercellese
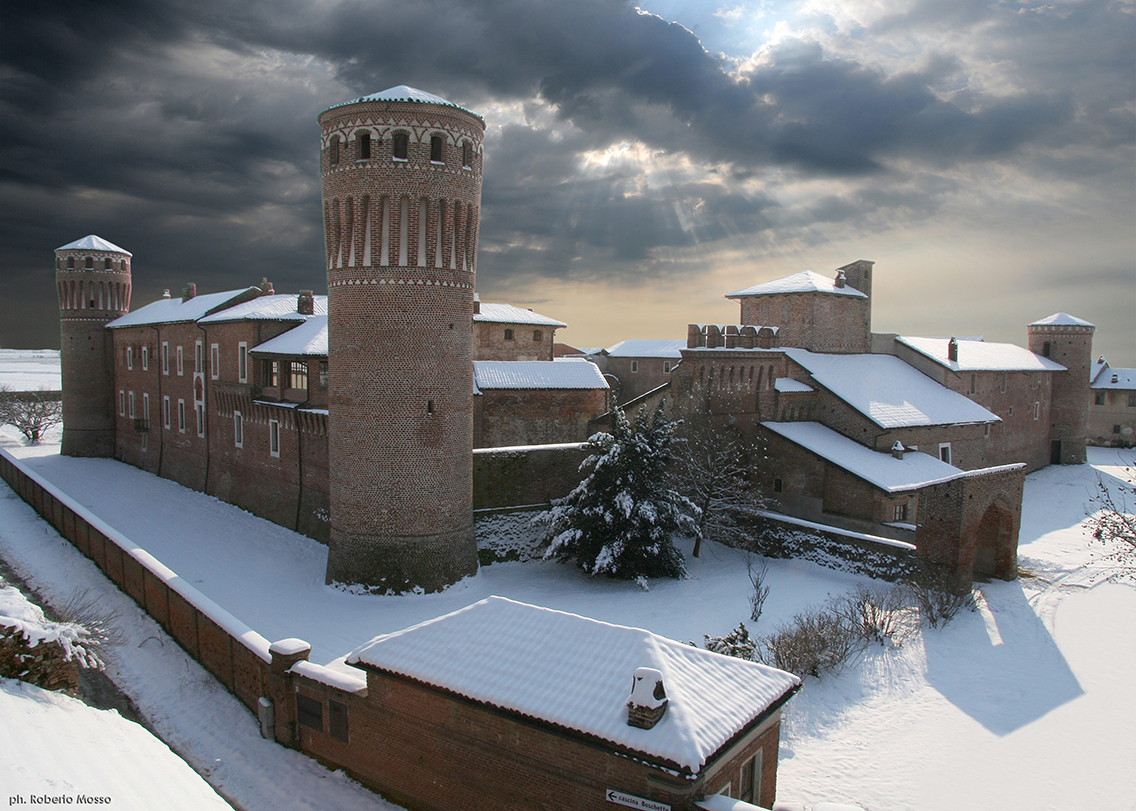

- Coat of arms

- Location within Italy Location within Piedmont
- Coordinates: 45°23′N 8°22′E
- Country: Italy
- Region: Piedmont
- Province: Vercelli (VC)

Government
  - Mayor: Alessandra Ticozzi

Area
  - Total: 11.1 km^{2} (4.3 sq mi)

Population (Dec. 2004)
  - Total: 438
  - Density: 39.5/km^{2} (102/sq mi)
- Demonym: Quintini or Quintesi
- Time zone: UTC+1 (CET)
  - Summer (DST): UTC+2 (CEST)
- Postal code: 13030
- Dialing code: 0161

Quinto Vercellese is a comune (municipality) in the Province of Vercelli in the Italian region Piedmont, located about 60 kilometres (37 mi) northeast of Turin and about 8 kilometres (5 mi) northwest of Vercelli. As of 31 December 2004, it had a population of 438 and an area of 11.1 square kilometres (4.3 mi^{2}).

Quinto Vercellese borders the following municipalities: Caresanablot, Collobiano, Olcenengo, and Oldenico.
