= Olcenengo =

- Comune
- Comune di Olcenengo
- Coat of arms

- Location within Italy Location within Piedmont
- Coordinates: 45°22′N 8°19′E
- Country: Italy
- Region: Piedmont
- Province: Vercelli (VC)

Government
  - Mayor: Ercole Gaibazzi

Area
  - Total: 16.5 km^{2} (6.4 sq mi)

Population (2004)
  - Total: 635
  - Density: 38.5/km^{2} (99.7/sq mi)
- Demonym: Olcenenghesi
- Time zone: UTC+1 (CET)
  - Summer (DST): UTC+2 (CEST)
- Postal code: 13040
- Dialing code: 0161

Olcenengo (Osnengh in Piedmontese) is a comune (municipality) in the Province of Vercelli in the Italian region Piedmont, located about 60 kilometres (37 mi) northeast of Turin and about 10 kilometres (6 mi) northwest of Vercelli.

Olcenengo borders the following municipalities: Caresanablot, Casanova Elvo, Collobiano, Quinto Vercellese, San Germano Vercellese, and Vercelli.
