= Villata =

- Comune
- Comune di Villata
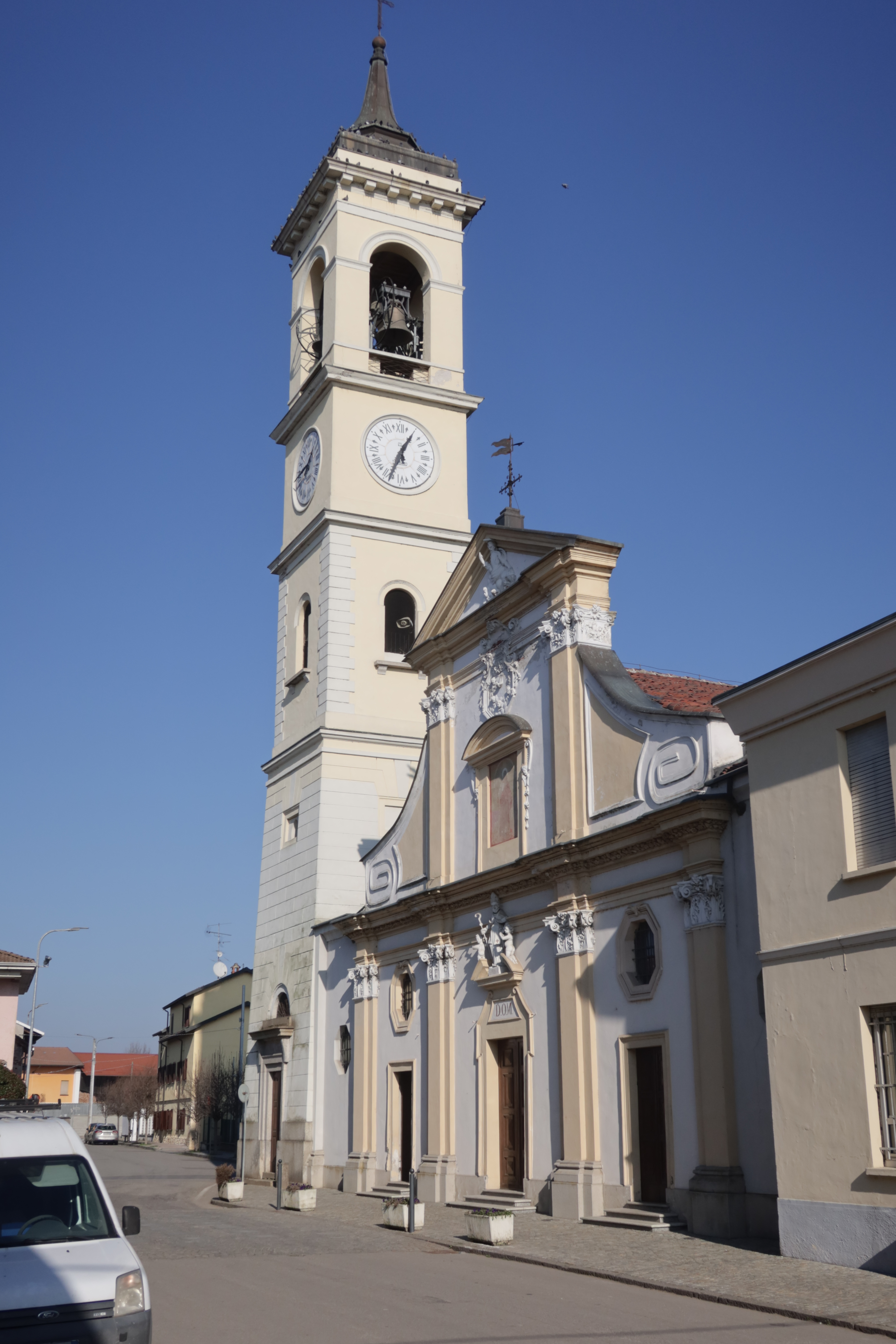

- Coat of arms

- Location within Italy Location within Piedmont
- Coordinates: 45°23′N 8°26′E
- Country: Italy
- Region: Piedmont
- Province: Vercelli (VC)

Government
  - Mayor: Franco Bullano

Area
  - Total: 14.4 km^{2} (5.6 sq mi)
- Elevation: 136 m (446 ft)

Population (Dec. 2004)
  - Total: 1,615
  - Density: 112/km^{2} (290/sq mi)
- Demonym: Villatesi
- Time zone: UTC+1 (CET)
  - Summer (DST): UTC+2 (CEST)
- Postal code: 13010
- Dialing code: 0161
- Website: Official website

Villata is a comune () in the Province of Vercelli in the Italian region Piedmont, located about 70 kilometres (43 mi) northeast of Turin and about 8 kilometres (5 mi) north of Vercelli.

Villata borders the following municipalities: Borgo Vercelli, Caresanablot, Casalvolone, Oldenico, San Nazzaro Sesia, and Vercelli. The municipal area is 14.37 square kilometres (5.55 mi^{2}).
