= Province of Vercelli =

Province of Italy

Coordinates: 45°19′N 8°25′E

Province of Vercelli Provincia di Vercelli (Italian) Provincia ëd Vërsèj (Piedmontese)
- Province
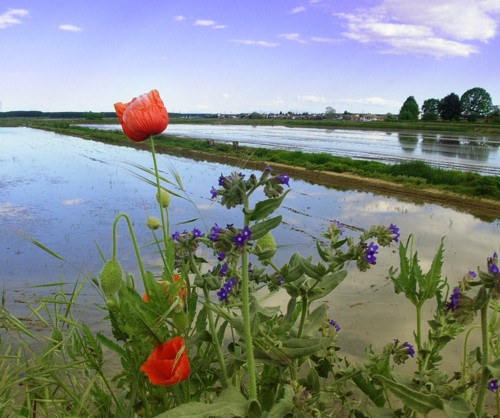
- Rice farms in the province of Vercelli

- Coat of arms

- Location of the province of Vercelli in Italy
- Country: Italy
- Region: Piedmont
- Capital(s): Vercelli
- Municipalities: 82

Government
  - President: Davide Gilardino

Area
  - Total: 2,081.64 km^{2} (803.73 sq mi)

Population (2026)
  - Total: 166,166
  - Density: 79.8246/km^{2} (206.745/sq mi)

GDP
  - Total: €4.725 billion (2015)
  - Per capita: €26,922 (2015)
- Time zone: UTC+1 (CET)
  - Summer (DST): UTC+2 (CEST)
- Postal code: 13010-13012, 13015, 13017-13028, 13030-13041, 13043-13049, 13060, 13100
- Telephone prefix: 015, 0161, 0163
- Vehicle registration: VC
- ISTAT code: 002

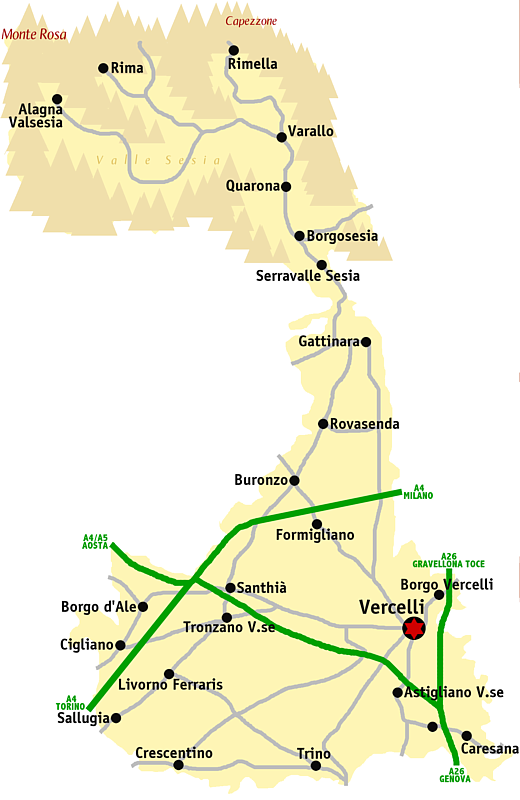
Cities, towns and roads of the province

The province of Vercelli (Italian: provincia di Vercelli, Piedmontese: Provincia ëd Vërsèj) is a province in the region of Piedmont in northern Italy. Its capital is Vercelli.

It has a population of 166,166 in an area of 2,081 square kilometres (803 mi^{2}) across its 82 municipalities.

It is an area known for the cultivation of rice.

== Municipalities ==
The province has 82 municipalities:

- Alagna Valsesia
- Albano Vercellese
- Alice Castello
- Alto Sermenza
- Arborio
- Asigliano Vercellese
- Balmuccia
- Balocco
- Bianzè
- Boccioleto
- Borgo d'Ale
- Borgo Vercelli
- Borgosesia
- Buronzo
- Campertogno
- Carcoforo
- Caresana
- Caresanablot
- Carisio
- Casanova Elvo
- Cellio con Breia
- Cervatto
- Cigliano
- Civiasco
- Collobiano
- Costanzana
- Cravagliana
- Crescentino
- Crova
- Desana
- Fobello
- Fontanetto Po
- Formigliana
- Gattinara
- Ghislarengo
- Greggio
- Guardabosone
- Lamporo
- Lenta
- Lignana
- Livorno Ferraris
- Lozzolo
- Mollia
- Moncrivello
- Motta de' Conti
- Olcenengo
- Oldenico
- Palazzolo Vercellese
- Pertengo
- Pezzana
- Pila
- Piode
- Postua
- Prarolo
- Quarona
- Quinto Vercellese
- Rassa
- Rimella
- Rive
- Roasio
- Ronsecco
- Rossa
- Rovasenda
- Salasco
- Sali Vercellese
- Saluggia
- San Germano Vercellese
- San Giacomo Vercellese
- Santhià
- Scopa
- Scopello
- Serravalle Sesia
- Stroppiana
- Tricerro
- Trino
- Tronzano Vercellese
- Valduggia
- Varallo
- Vercelli
- Villarboit
- Villata
- Vocca

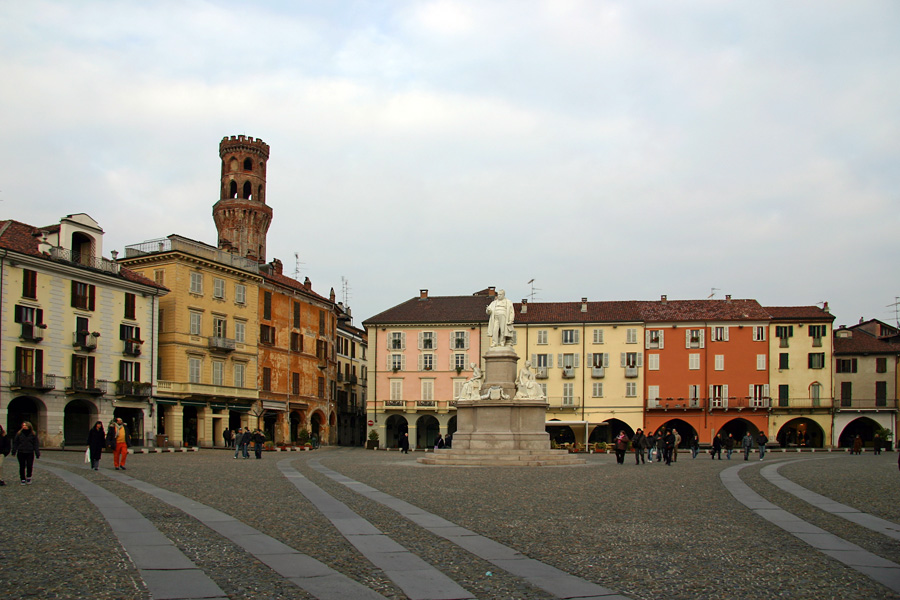
Vercelli

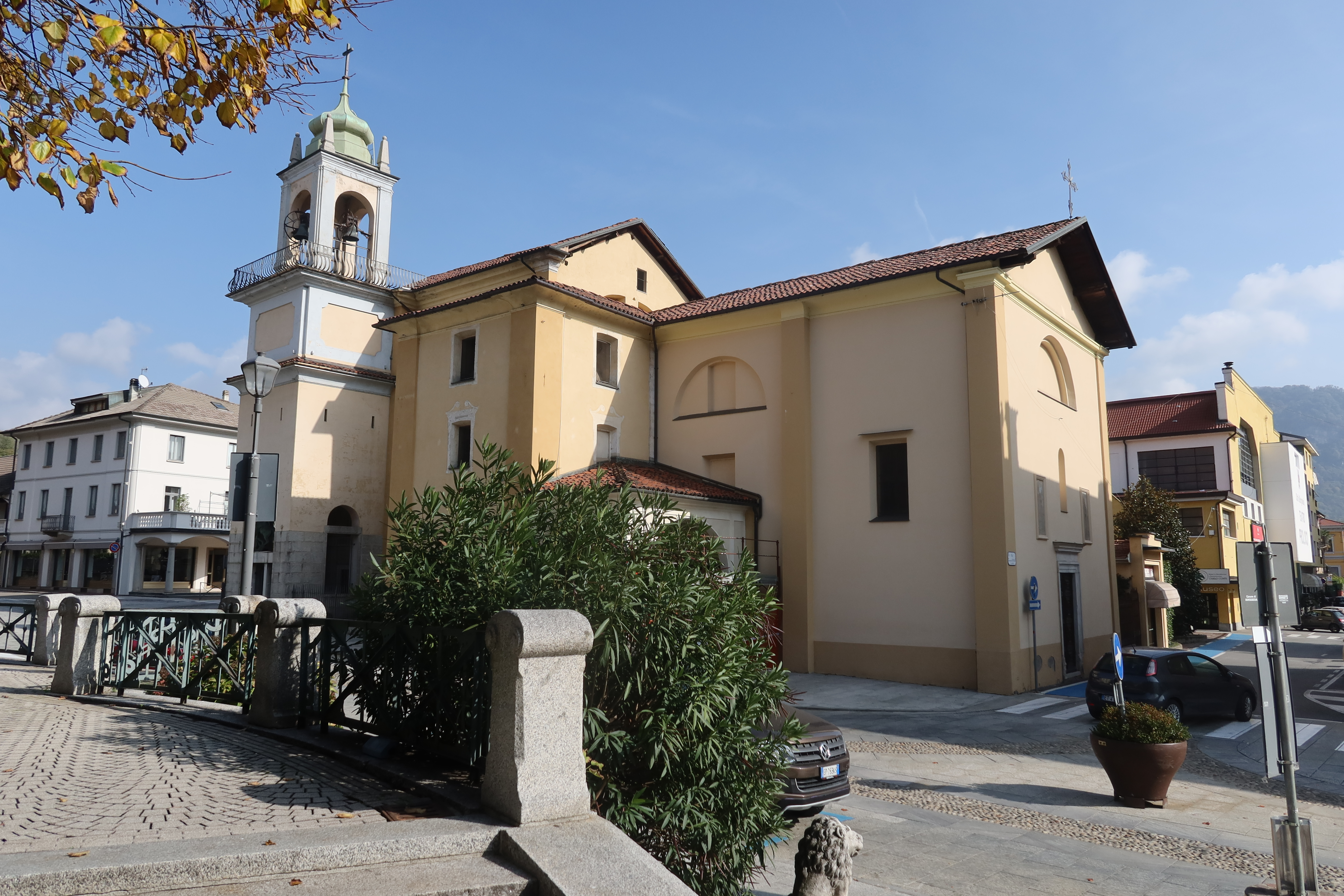
Borgosesia

== Demographics ==
As of 2026, the population is 166,166, of which 49.1% are male, and 50.9% are female. Minors make up 13.3% of the population, and seniors make up 28.5%.

Historical population
(Current borders)

| Year | Pop. | ±% |
|---|---|---|
| 1861 | 181,237 | — |
| 1871 | 192,300 | +6.1% |
| 1881 | 206,713 | +7.5% |
| 1901 | 216,194 | +4.6% |
| 1911 | 211,871 | −2.0% |
| 1921 | 195,844 | −7.6% |
| 1931 | 197,457 | +0.8% |
| 1936 | 196,831 | −0.3% |

| Year | Pop. | ±% |
|---|---|---|
| 1951 | 195,044 | −0.9% |
| 1961 | 198,622 | +1.8% |
| 1971 | 200,830 | +1.1% |
| 1981 | 193,822 | −3.5% |
| 1991 | 183,869 | −5.1% |
| 2001 | 176,829 | −3.8% |
| 2011 | 176,941 | +0.1% |
| 2021 | 166,083 | −6.1% |

Source: ISTAT

=== Immigration ===
As of 2025, immigrants make up 13.2% of the population. The 5 largest foreign countries of birth are Morocco, Romania, Albania, Ukraine, and China.

== Main sights ==
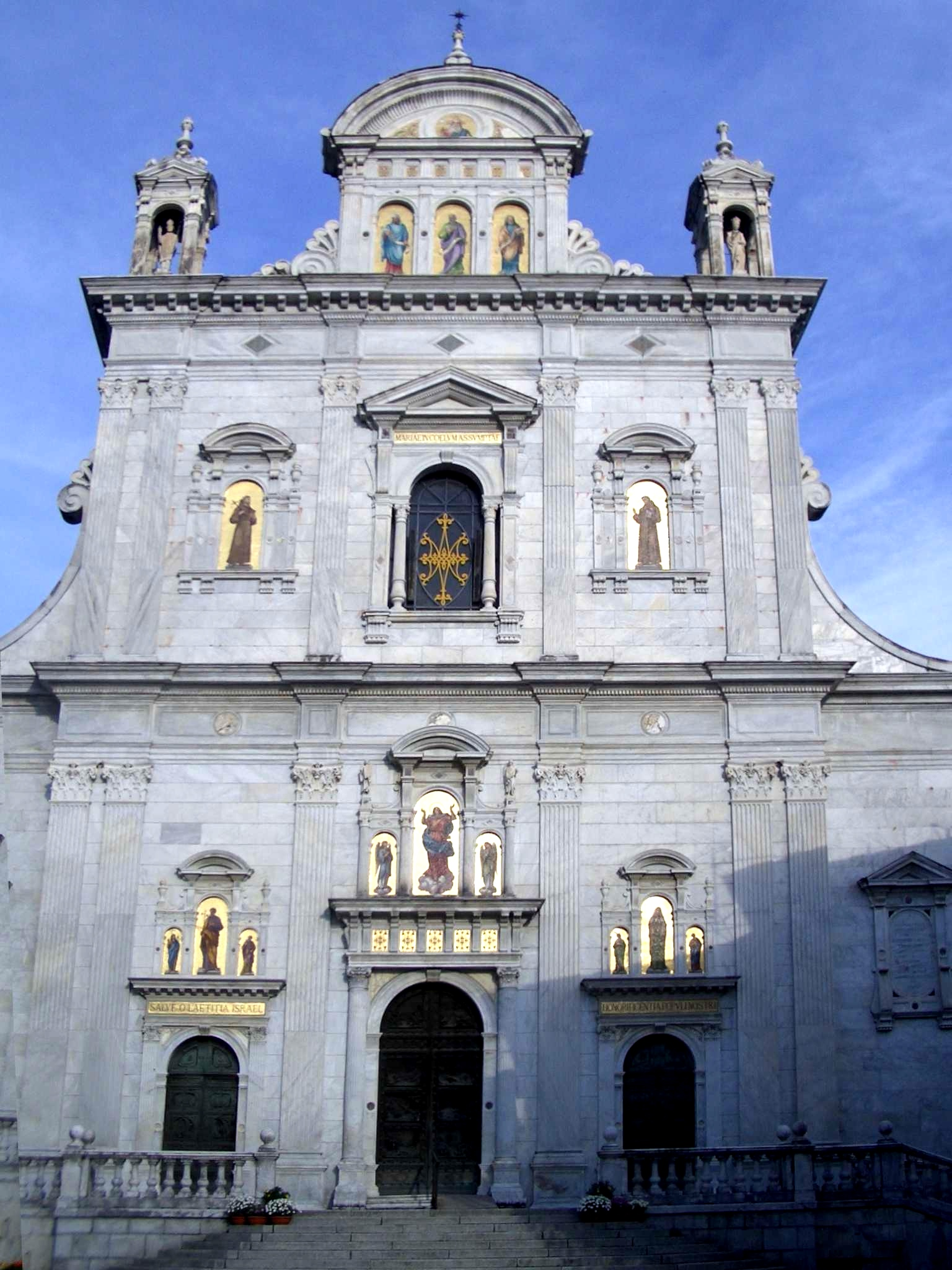
Sacro Monte di Varallo. Façade of the basilica.

In 2003, UNESCO added the Sacred Mountain of Varallo to the World Heritage List.

Other historical sights include the Basilica of Sant'Andrea in Vercelli. There are also numerous natural sights in the Valsesia area.

== Transport ==
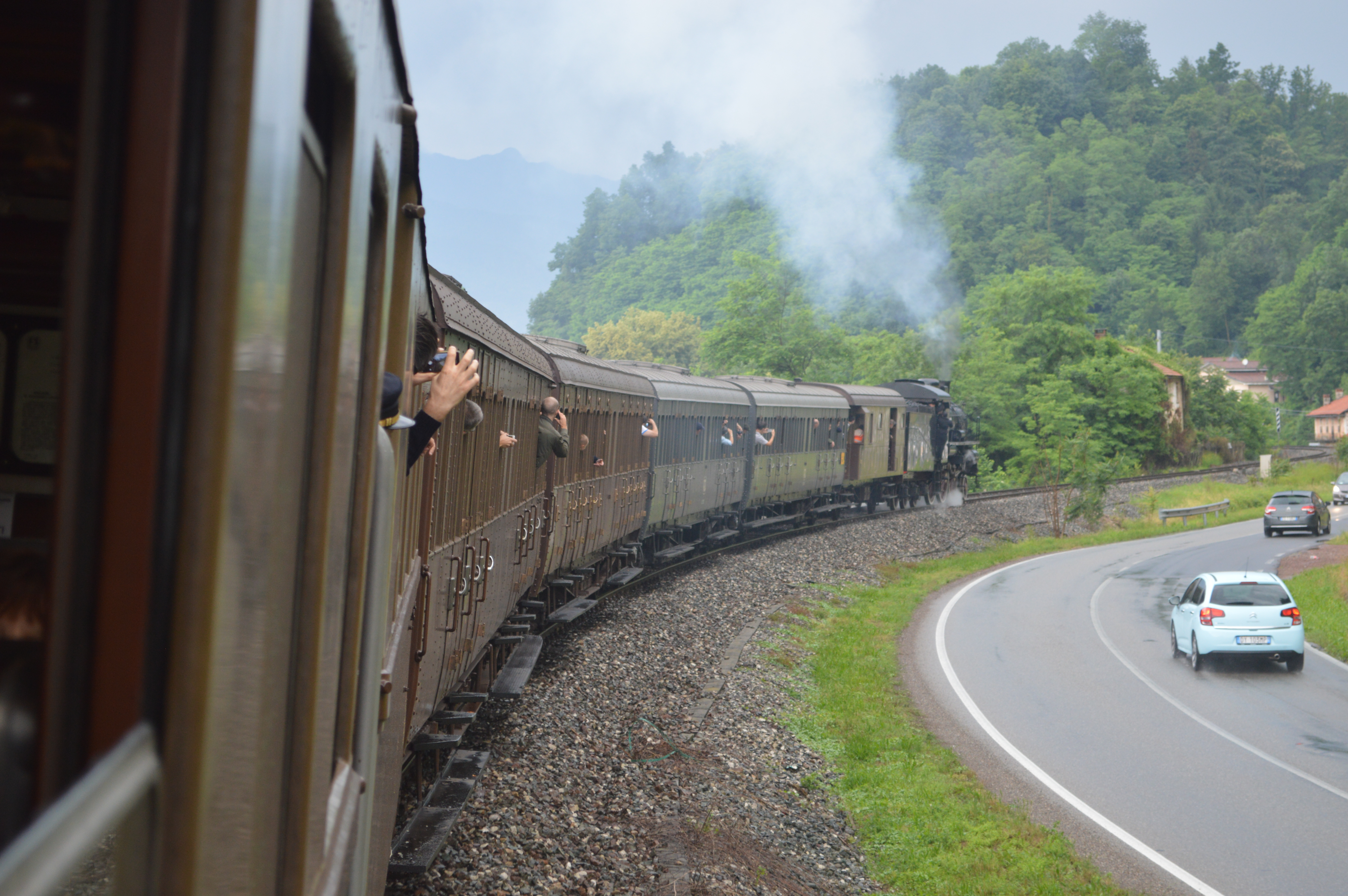
The trip on an Italian historic train, near Borgosesia

=== Motorways ===
The province is crossed by the following motorways (in Italian, autostrade):

- Autostrada A4: Turin-Trieste
- Autostrada A26: Genoa-Gravellona Toce

=== Railway lines ===
- Turin–Milan railway
- Vercelli–Pavia railway
- Santhià–Biella railway
- Novara–Varallo railway
