= Alice Castello =

- Comune
- Comune di Alice Castello
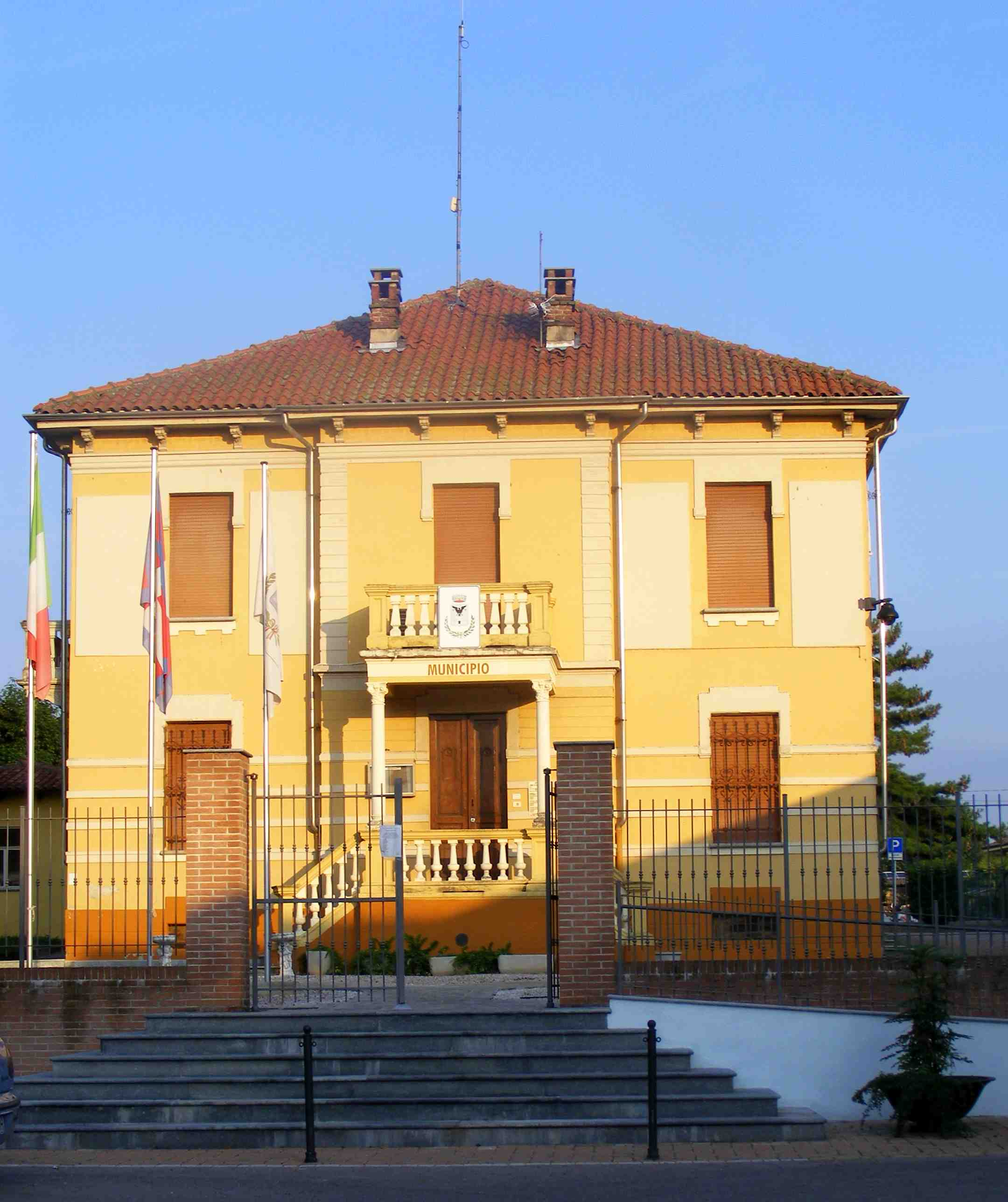
- Town Hall

- Coat of arms

- Location of Alice Castello in Italy Alice Castello (Piedmont)
- Coordinates: 45°22′N 8°5′E
- Country: Italy
- Region: Piedmont
- Province: Vercelli (VC)

Government
  - Mayor: Vittorio Petrino

Area
  - Total: 24.8 km^{2} (9.6 sq mi)
- Elevation: 288 m (945 ft)

Population (31 December 2010)
  - Total: 2,716
  - Density: 110/km^{2} (284/sq mi)
- Demonym: Alicesi
- Time zone: UTC+1 (CET)
  - Summer (DST): UTC+2 (CEST)
- Postal code: 13040
- Dialing code: 0161
- Website: www.comune-alicecastello-vercelli.it

Alice Castello is a comune (municipality) in the Province of Vercelli in the Italian region Piedmont, located about 45 kilometres (28 mi) northeast of Turin and about 25 kilometres (16 mi) west of Vercelli.

Alice is known since the 10th century AD. Located there are a castle (of which only few remains of the medieval structure have survived) and an 18th-century parish church dedicated to St. Nicholas.

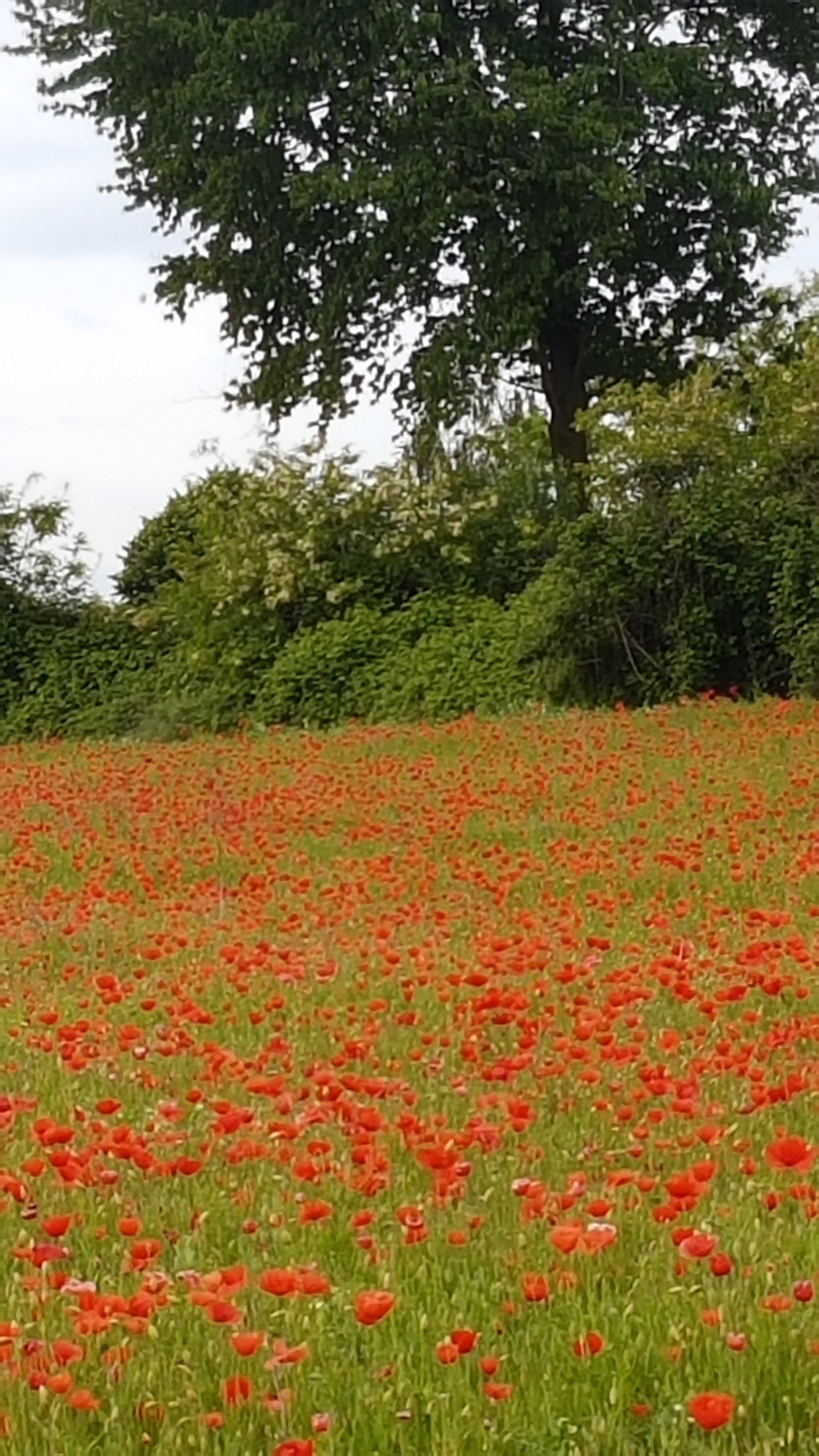
Flowering of poppies in May in the countryside near Alice Castello

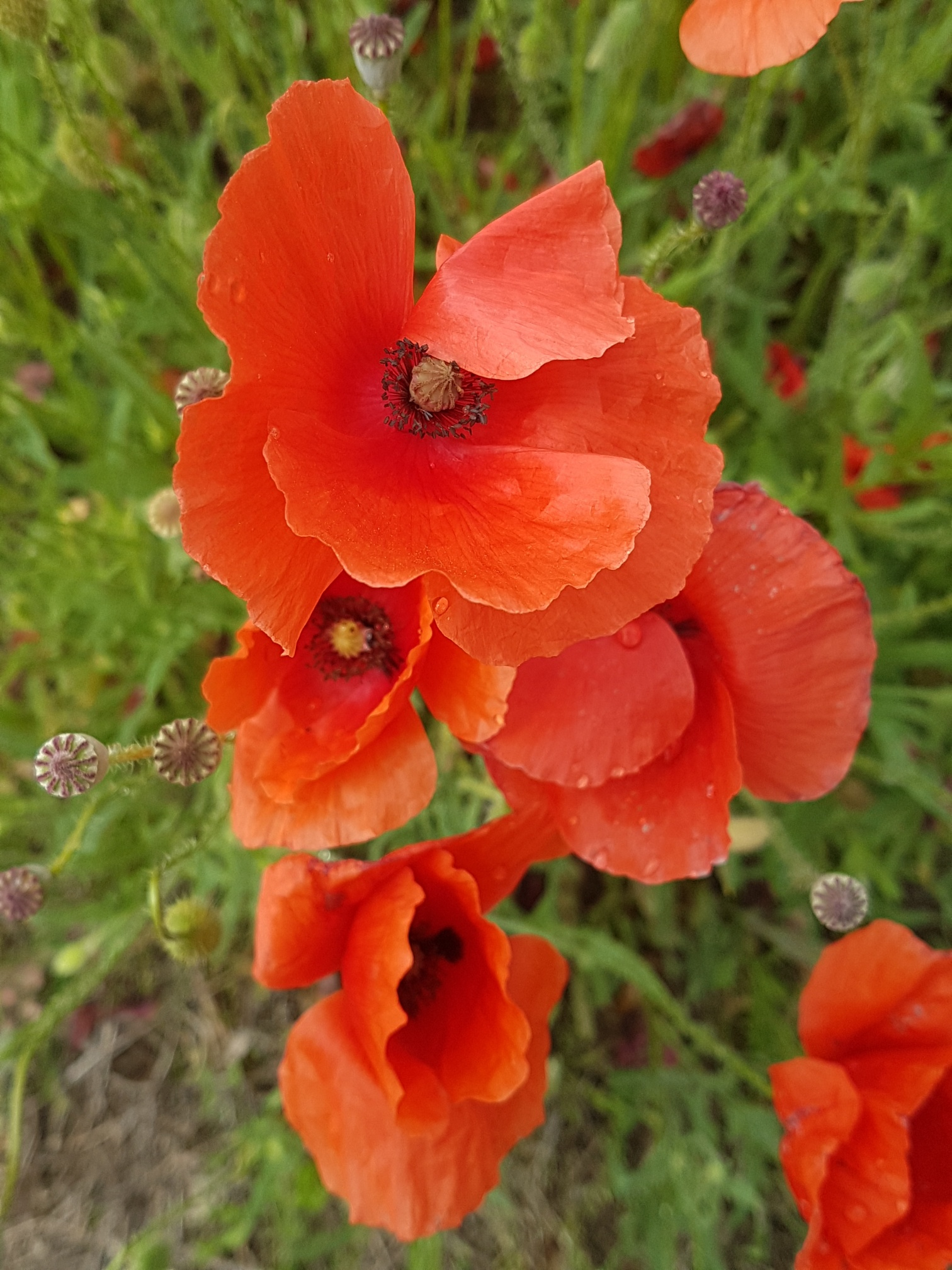
Red poppies in full bloom at Alice Castello
