= San Germano Vercellese =

San Germano Vercellese San German
- Comune
- Comune di San Germano Vercellese
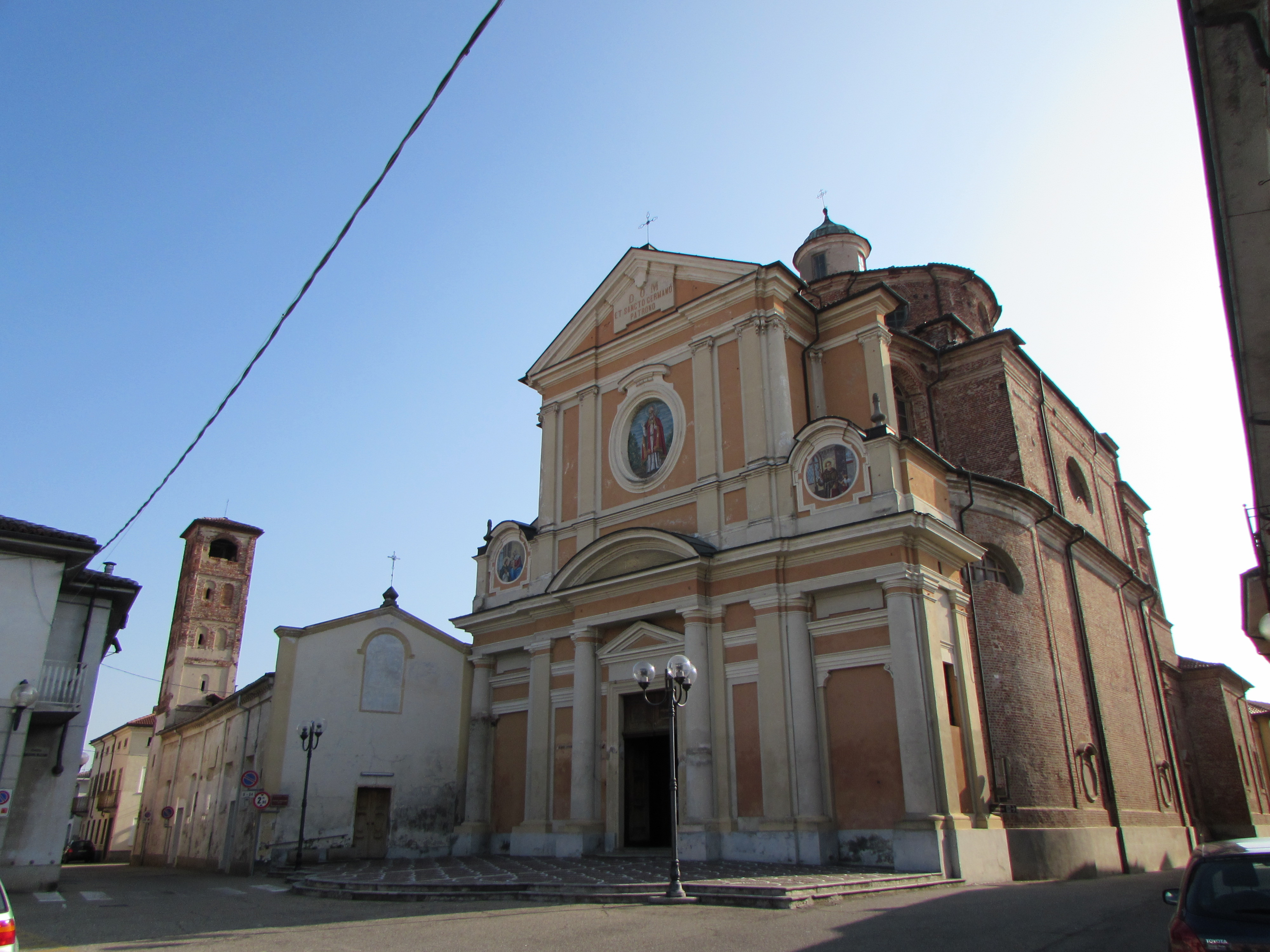
- Church of St. German of Auxerre.

- Location within Italy Location within Piedmont
- Coordinates: 45°21′N 8°15′E
- Country: Italy
- Region: Piedmont
- Province: Vercelli (VC)

Government
  - Mayor: Gianni Mentigazzi

Area
  - Total: 30.7 km^{2} (11.9 sq mi)
- Elevation: 161 m (528 ft)

Population (31 December 2010)
  - Total: 1,784
  - Density: 58.1/km^{2} (151/sq mi)
- Demonym: Sangermanesi
- Time zone: UTC+1 (CET)
  - Summer (DST): UTC+2 (CEST)
- Postal code: 13047
- Dialing code: 0161
- Website: Official website

San Germano Vercellese (Piedmontese: San German) is a comune (municipality) in the Province of Vercelli in the Italian region Piedmont, located about 50 kilometres (31 mi) northeast of Turin and about 14 kilometres (9 mi) northwest of Vercelli.

San Germano Vercellese borders the following municipalities: Casanova Elvo, Crova, Olcenengo, Salasco, Santhià, Tronzano Vercellese, and Vercelli.
