= Caresanablot =

- Comune
- Comune di Caresanablot
- Coat of arms

- Location within Italy Location within Piedmont
- Coordinates: 45°21′N 8°23′E
- Country: Italy
- Region: Piedmont
- Province: Vercelli (VC)

Government
  - Mayor: Italo Grosso

Area
  - Total: 11.1 km^{2} (4.3 sq mi)
- Elevation: 135 m (443 ft)

Population (Dec. 2004)
  - Total: 1,057
  - Density: 95.2/km^{2} (247/sq mi)
- Demonym: Caresanablottesi
- Time zone: UTC+1 (CET)
  - Summer (DST): UTC+2 (CEST)
- Postal code: 13030
- Dialing code: 0161

Caresanablot is a comune (municipality) in the Province of Vercelli in the Italian region Piedmont, located about 60 kilometres (37 mi) northeast of Turin and about 5 kilometres (3 mi) northwest of Vercelli.

Caresanablot borders the following municipalities: Olcenengo, Oldenico, Quinto Vercellese, Vercelli, and Villata.
