= Bianzè =

- Comune
- Comune di Bianzè
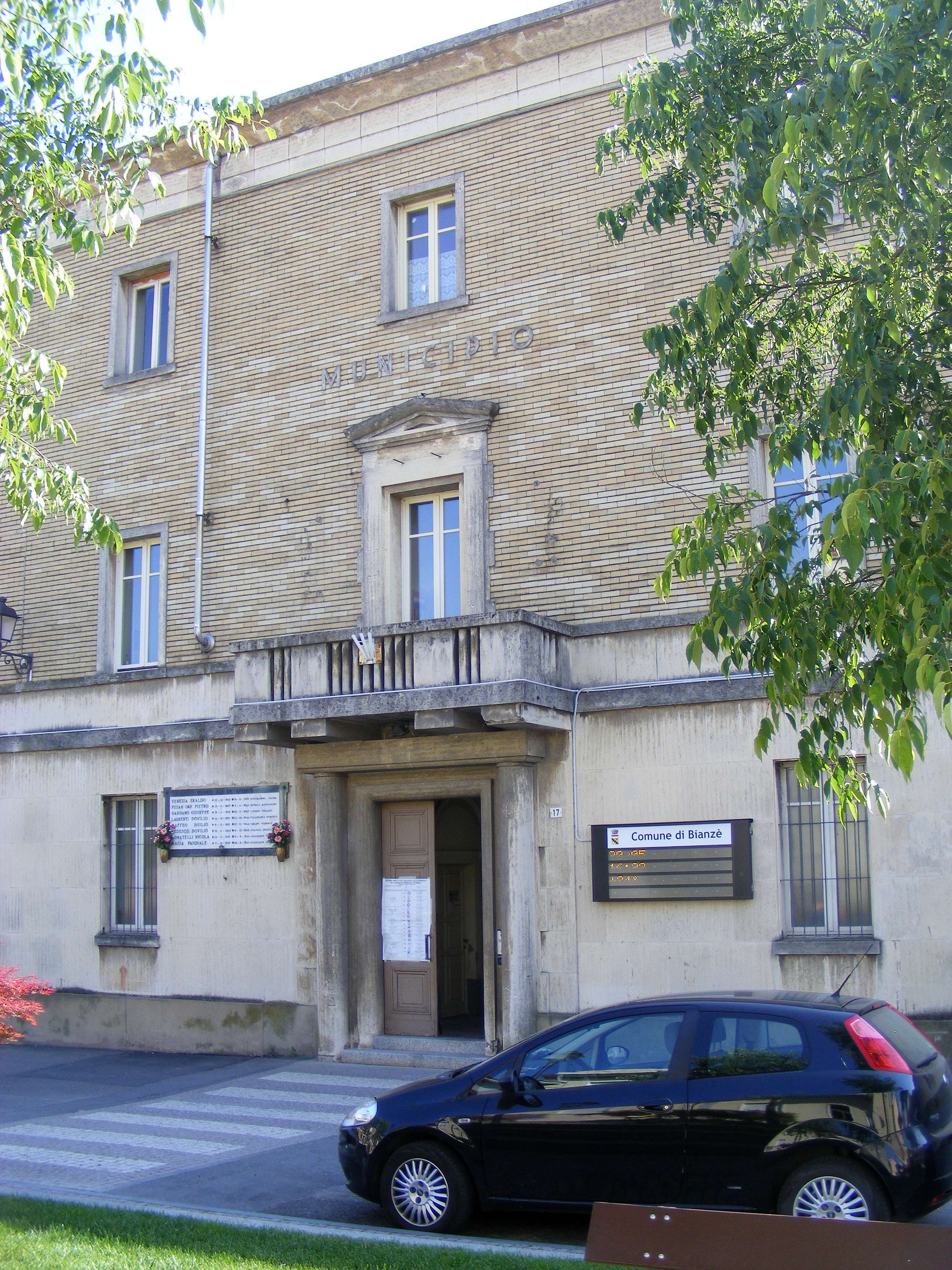
- Town hall.

- Coat of arms

- Location within Italy Location within Piedmont
- Coordinates: 45°18′N 8°7′E
- Country: Italy
- Region: Piedmont
- Province: Vercelli (VC)

Government
  - Mayor: Maurizio Marangoni

Area
  - Total: 41.8 km^{2} (16.1 sq mi)
- Elevation: 182 m (597 ft)

Population (31 January 2013)
  - Total: 2,011
  - Density: 48.1/km^{2} (125/sq mi)
- Demonym: Bianzinesi
- Time zone: UTC+1 (CET)
  - Summer (DST): UTC+2 (CEST)
- Postal code: 13041
- Dialing code: 0161
- Patron saint: St. Eusebius
- Saint day: First Monday in August

Bianzè is a comune (municipality) in the Province of Vercelli in the Italian region Piedmont, about 40 kilometres (25 mi) northeast of Turin and about 25 kilometres (16 mi) west of Vercelli.

== Notable people ==
- Orsola Maddalena Caccia (1596–1676), painter and nun
- Paolo Comotto (1824–1897), diplomat
- Andrea Ferrero (1903–1996), diplomat
- Francesco Giacinto Gonzaga (1616–1630), nobleman and abbot
- Lorenzo Bernardino Pinto (1704–1788), architect
