= Villarboit =

- Comune
- Comune di Villarboit
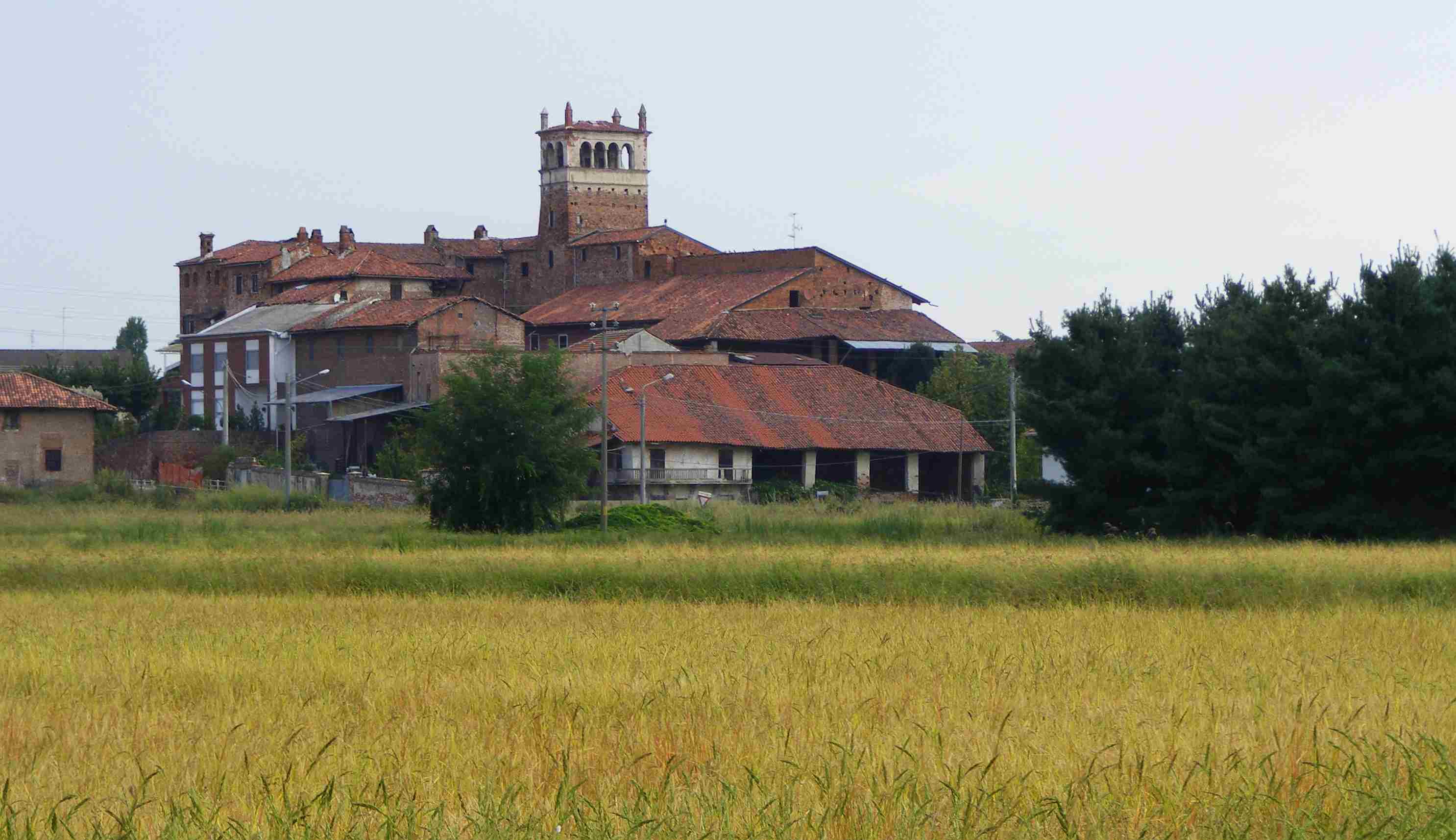

- Coat of arms

- Location within Italy Location within Piedmont
- Coordinates: 45°26′N 8°20′E
- Country: Italy
- Region: Piedmont
- Province: Vercelli (VC)
- Frazioni: Busonengo, San Marco

Government
  - Mayor: Virginia Gili

Area
  - Total: 25.4 km^{2} (9.8 sq mi)
- Elevation: 162 m (531 ft)

Population (Dec. 2004)
  - Total: 495
  - Density: 19.5/km^{2} (50.5/sq mi)
- Demonym: Villarboitesi
- Time zone: UTC+1 (CET)
  - Summer (DST): UTC+2 (CEST)
- Postal code: 13030
- Dialing code: 0161
- Patron saint: Saint Peter and Paul, Saint Mark and the Holy Virgin
- Saint day: 28 June, 25 April, the first Sunday of September
- Website: Official website

Villarboit is a comune (municipality) in the Province of Vercelli in the Italian region Piedmont, located about 60 kilometres (37 mi) northeast of Turin and about 15 kilometres (9 mi) northwest of Vercelli.

It is included in the Lame del Sesia Natural Park.
