= Asigliano Vercellese =

Comune in Piedmont, Italy

- Comune
- Comune di Asigliano Vercellese
- Coat of arms

- Location within Italy Location within Piedmont
- Coordinates: 45°16′N 8°25′E
- Country: Italy
- Region: Piedmont
- Province: Vercelli (VC)

Government
  - Mayor: Carolina Ferraris

Area
  - Total: 26.3 km^{2} (10.2 sq mi)
- Elevation: 127 m (417 ft)

Population (Dec. 2004)
  - Total: 1,374
  - Density: 52.2/km^{2} (135/sq mi)
- Time zone: UTC+1 (CET)
  - Summer (DST): UTC+2 (CEST)
- Postal code: 13032
- Dialing code: 0161
- Patron saint: St. Victor
- Website: Official website

Asigliano Vercellese is a comune (municipality) in the Province of Vercelli in the Italian region Piedmont, located about 60 kilometres (37 mi) northeast of Turin and about 6 kilometres (4 mi) south of Vercelli.
