= Costanzana =

- Comune
- Comune di Costanzana
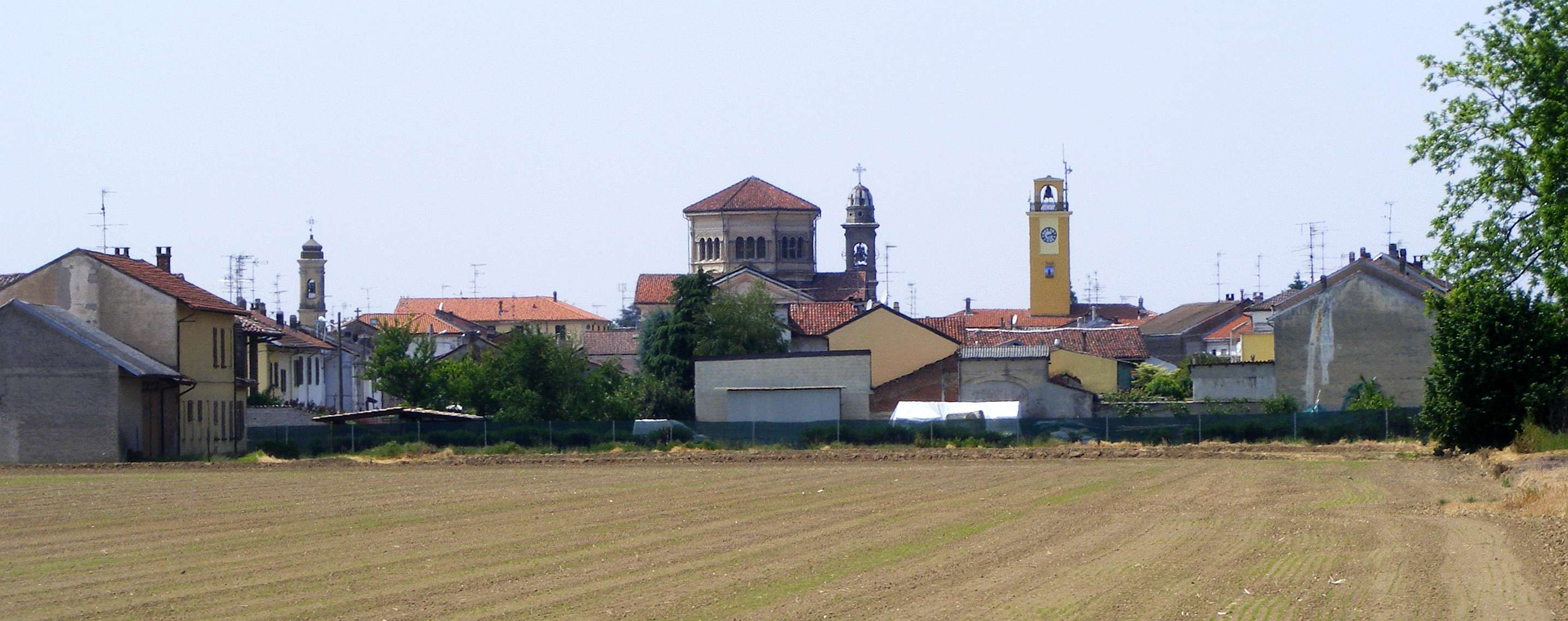

- Coat of arms

- Location within Italy Location within Piedmont
- Coordinates: 45°14′09″N 8°22′11″E
- Country: Italy
- Region: Piedmont
- Province: Vercelli (VC)

Government
  - Mayor: Raffaella Oppezzo

Area
  - Total: 21.1 km^{2} (8.1 sq mi)
- Elevation: 129 m (423 ft)

Population (Dec. 2004)
  - Total: 847
  - Density: 40.1/km^{2} (104/sq mi)
- Demonym: Costanzanesi
- Time zone: UTC+1 (CET)
  - Summer (DST): UTC+2 (CEST)
- Postal code: 13033
- Dialing code: 0161
- Website: Official website

Costanzana is a comune (municipality) in the Province of Vercelli in the Italian region Piedmont, located about 60 kilometres (37 mi) northeast of Turin and about 10 kilometres (6 mi) southwest of Vercelli.
