= Fontanetto Po =

- Comune
- Comune di Fontanetto Po
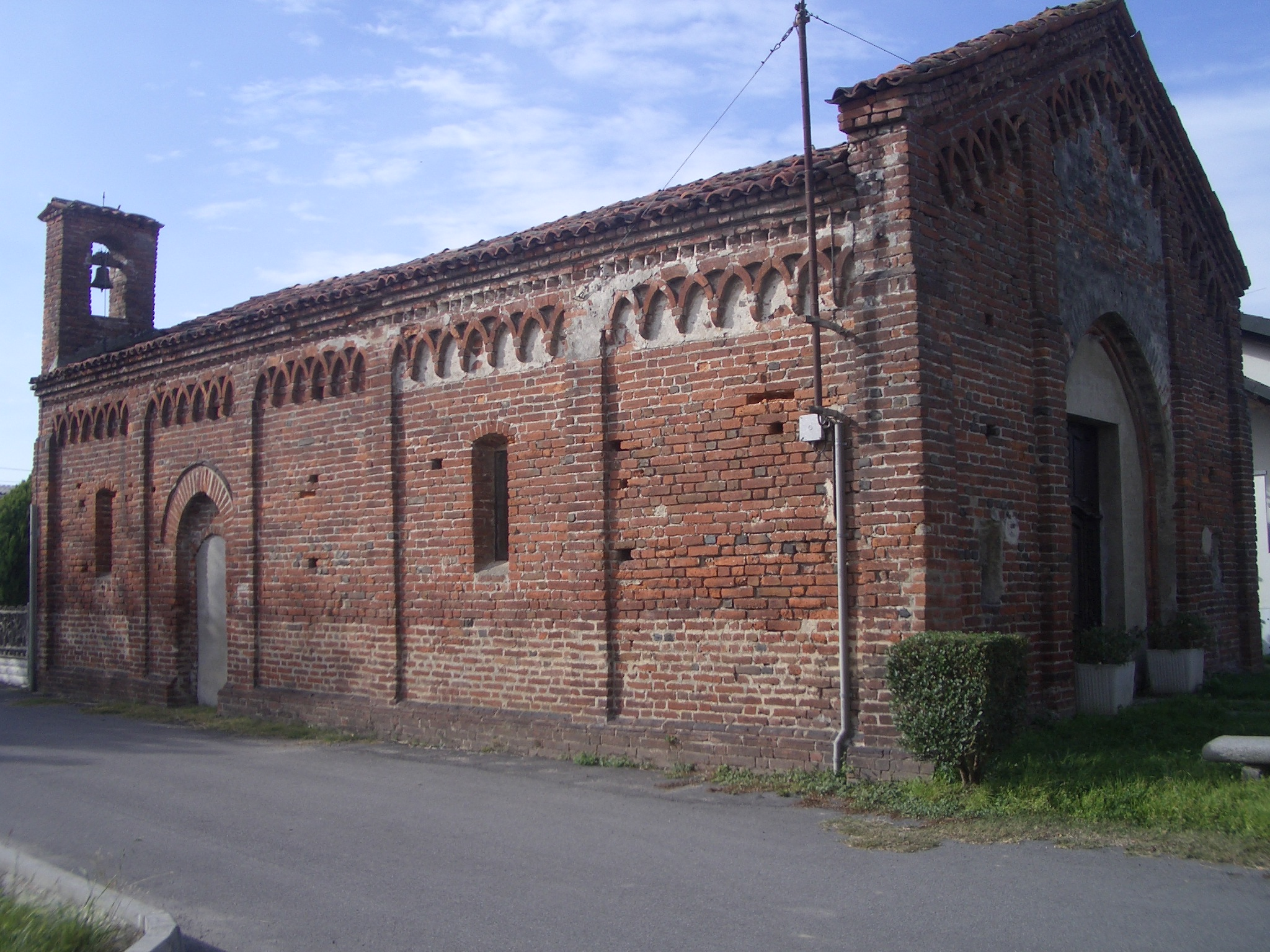
- Oratory of St. Sebastian

- Coat of arms

- Location within Italy Location within Piedmont
- Coordinates: 45°12′N 8°11′E
- Country: Italy
- Region: Piedmont
- Province: Vercelli (VC)
- Frazioni: La Guidera

Government
  - Mayor: Riccardo Vallino

Area
  - Total: 23.3 km^{2} (9.0 sq mi)
- Elevation: 120 m (390 ft)

Population (1 January 2014)
  - Total: 1,194
  - Density: 51.2/km^{2} (133/sq mi)
- Demonym: Fontanettesi
- Time zone: UTC+1 (CET)
  - Summer (DST): UTC+2 (CEST)
- Postal code: 13040
- Dialing code: 0161

Fontanetto Po is a comune (municipality) in the Province of Vercelli in the Italian region Piedmont, located about 40 kilometres (25 mi) northeast of Turin and about 20 kilometres (12 mi) southwest of Vercelli.

Fontanetto Po borders the following municipalities: Crescentino, Gabiano, Livorno Ferraris, Moncestino, Palazzolo Vercellese, and Trino.

== Main sights ==
- Oratory of St. Sebastian, built perhaps in the 11th century, and remade in the 15th century. The interior houses remains of mid-15th-century frescoes.
- Parish church of St. Martin, built in the 11th century and restored in the 16th–18th centuries
- Church of the Holy Trinity, built from 1488
- 15th century St. John Watermill

== People ==
- Giovanni Battista Viotti (1755–1824), violinist and composer, was born in Fontanetto Po. He was one of the great composers and violinists of his time. He is also credited with having composed the music of the Marseillaise, the French National Hymn, eleven years before Claude Joseph Rouget de Lisle.
