= Vettignè Castle =

Castle in Piedmont, Italy

- Castello di Vettignè
- Santhià, Piedmont, Italy
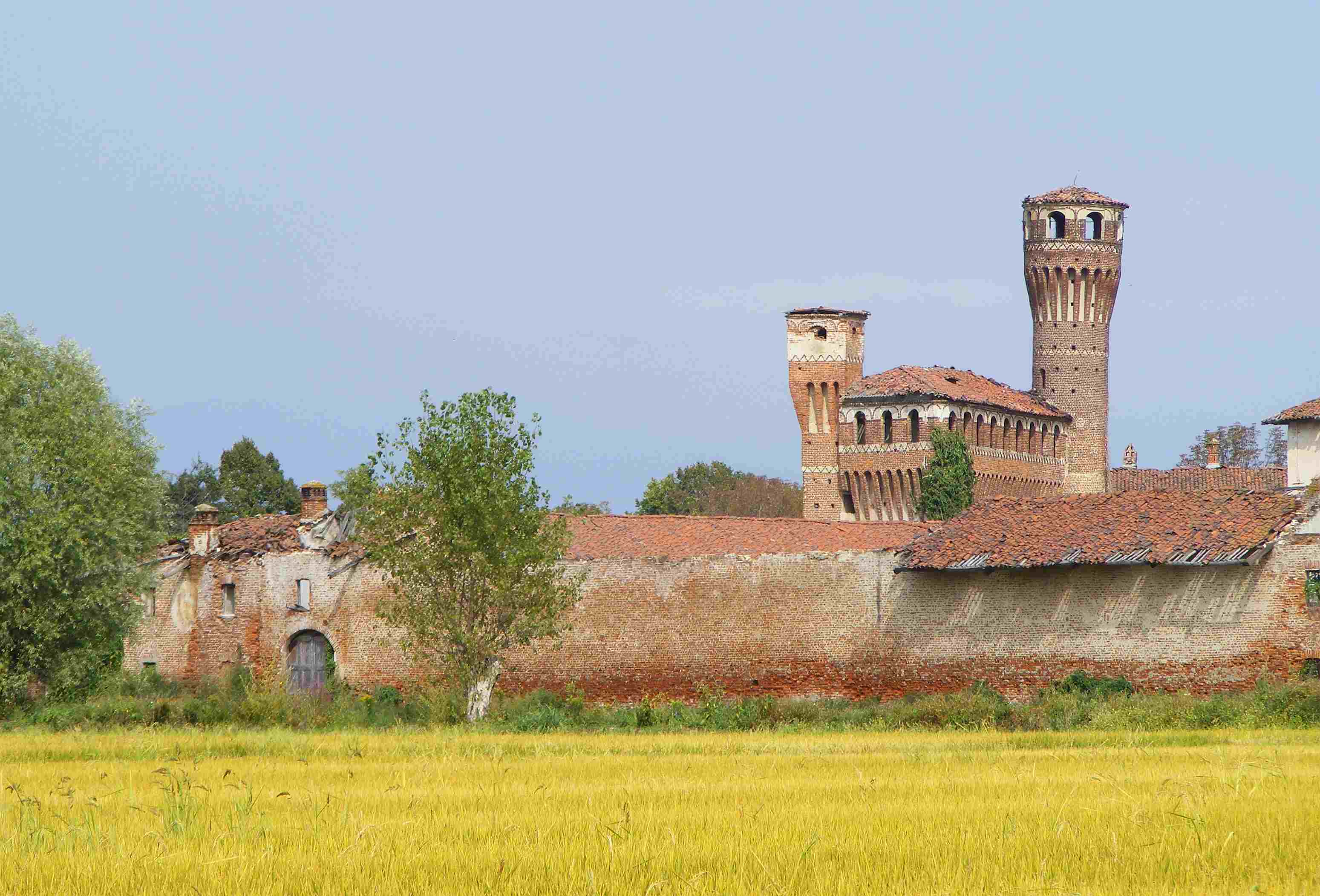
- Vettignè Castle in 2009

Site information
- Type: Castle

Location
- Coordinates: 45°23′35.53″N 8°14′19.36″E

Vettignè Castle (Italian: Castello di Vettignè) is a castle located in Santhià, Piedmont, Italy.

== History ==
The current structure of castle was built in the 15th century, most likely on an earlier fortification. Between 1554 and 1559 the castle and the surrounding area endured French occupation, before being returned to Savoyard control after the Treaty of Cateau-Cambrésis.

Between the late 17th and early 18th centuries, as its defensive role came to an end, the castle began to be transformed into a rural residence, and the surrounding area shifted toward an agricultural vocation, further supported by the spread of rice cultivation in the nearby countryside.

== Description ==
The complex consists of a quadrangular building enclosing a large courtyard. The most prominent structure is a massive fortified keep equipped with a cylindrical tower, reminiscent of the one at San Genuario Castle in Crescentino, and a small square turret projecting from the northeast corner. The construction features machicolations and battlements, which were later raised to accommodate the addition of windows.
