= Camino Castle =

Castle in Piedmont, Italy

- Castello di Camino
- Camino, Piedmont, Italy
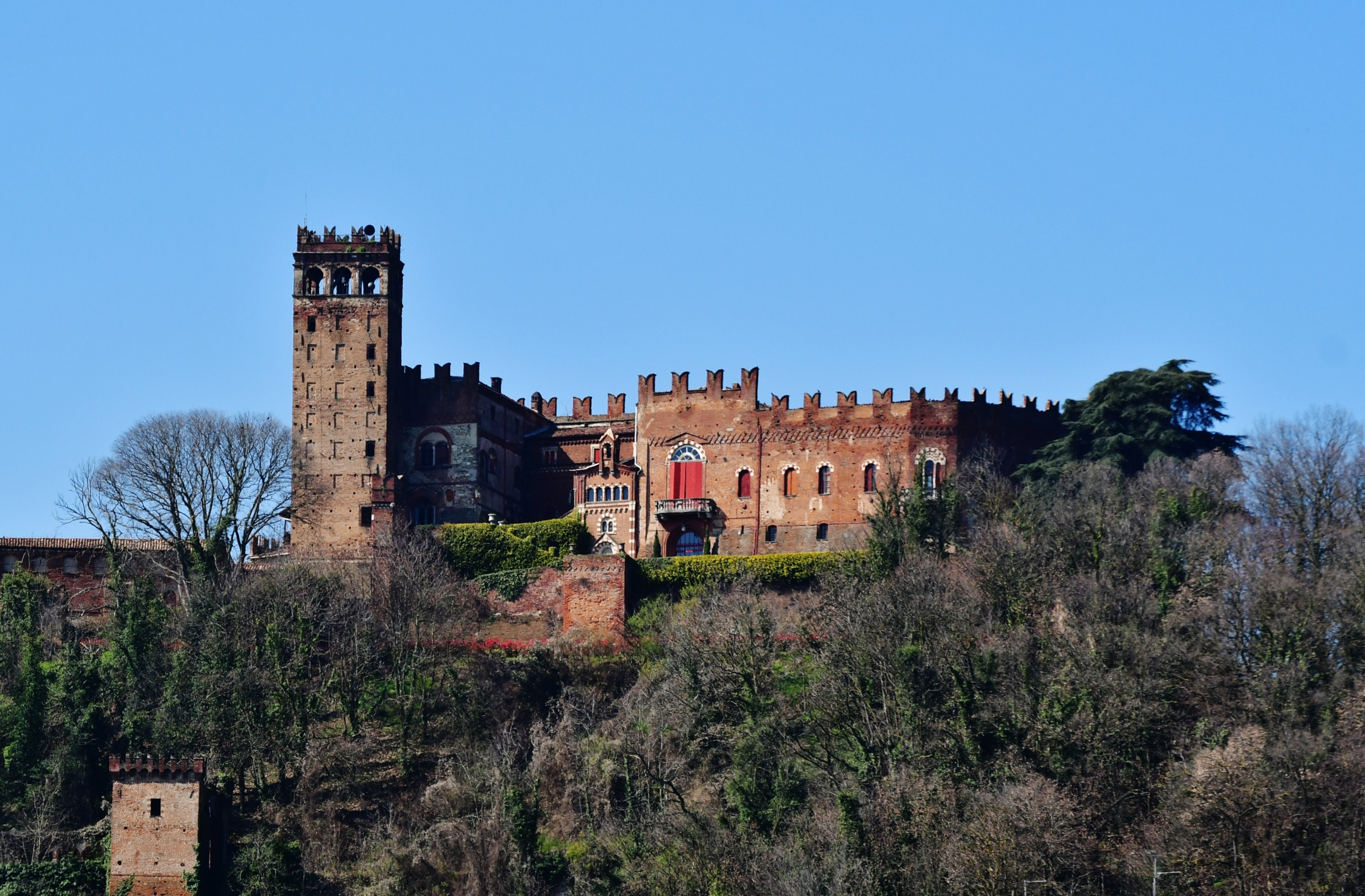
- Camino Castle in 2024

Site information
- Type: Castle

Location
- Coordinates: 45°09′43.35″N 8°16′52.12″E

Camino Castle (Italian: Castello di Camino) is a castle located in Camino, Piedmont, Italy.

== History ==
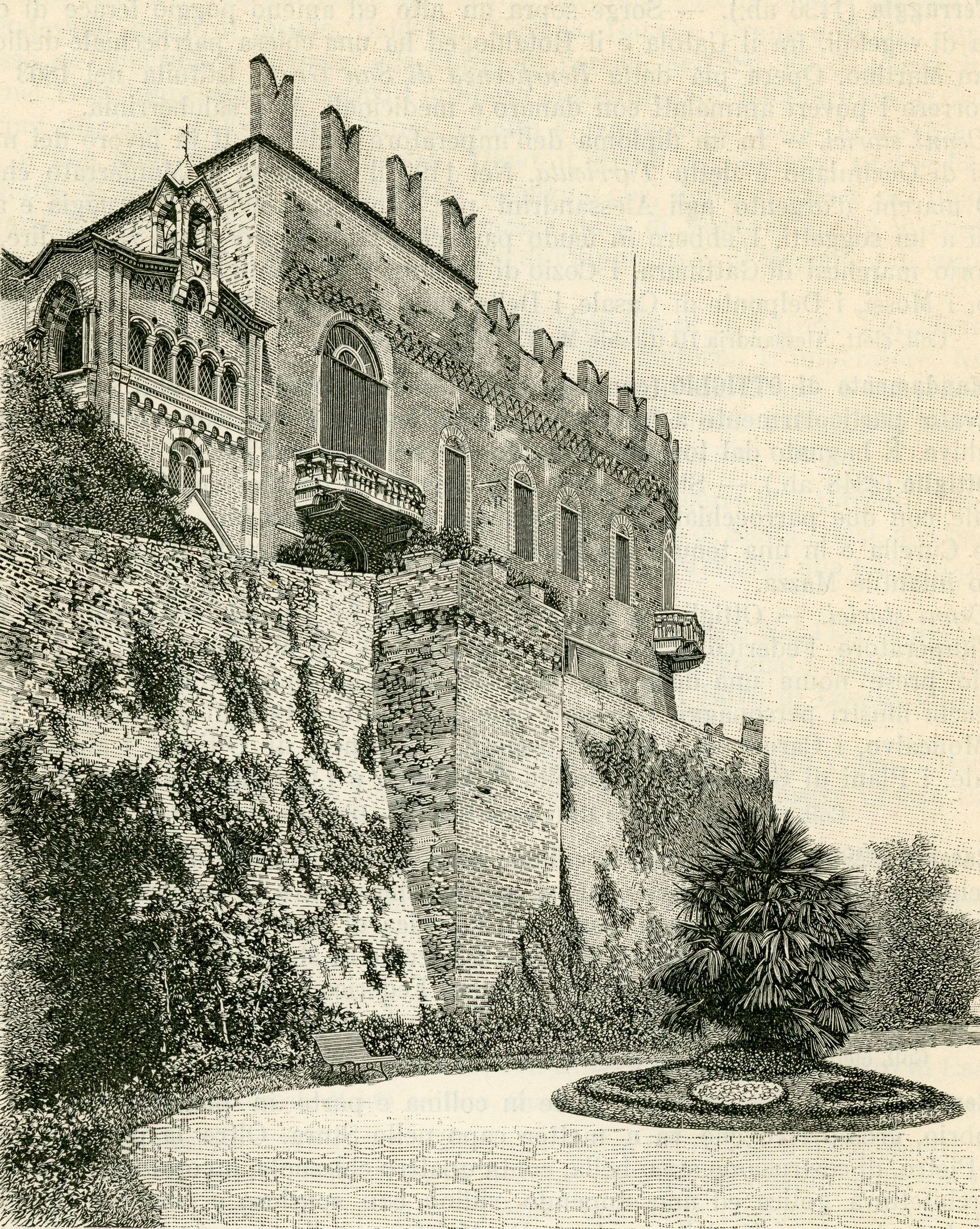
The castle in a woodcut by Giuseppe Barberis

The castle's existence has been documented since the 11th century. Originally founded by the Aleramici and later inherited by the Marquises of Monferrato, it was granted in the 13th century by Theodore Palaiologos to the Asti bankers Tommaso and Francesco Scarampi, whose family retained ownership until 1952. In the 19th century, the castle underwent an extensive restoration and remodeling campaign in the Gothic Revival style, commissioned by Ferdinando Scarampi.

== Description ==
The castle stands atop a hill overlooking the village of Camino. Surrounded by an expansive park filled with centuries-old trees, it features a crenellated defensive structure dominated by a square tower crowned with a loggia. Inside, the castle preserves richly decorated rooms, a library, a theater frescoed with scenes from Don Quixote, and a private chapel built in the 15th century.

== Gallery ==
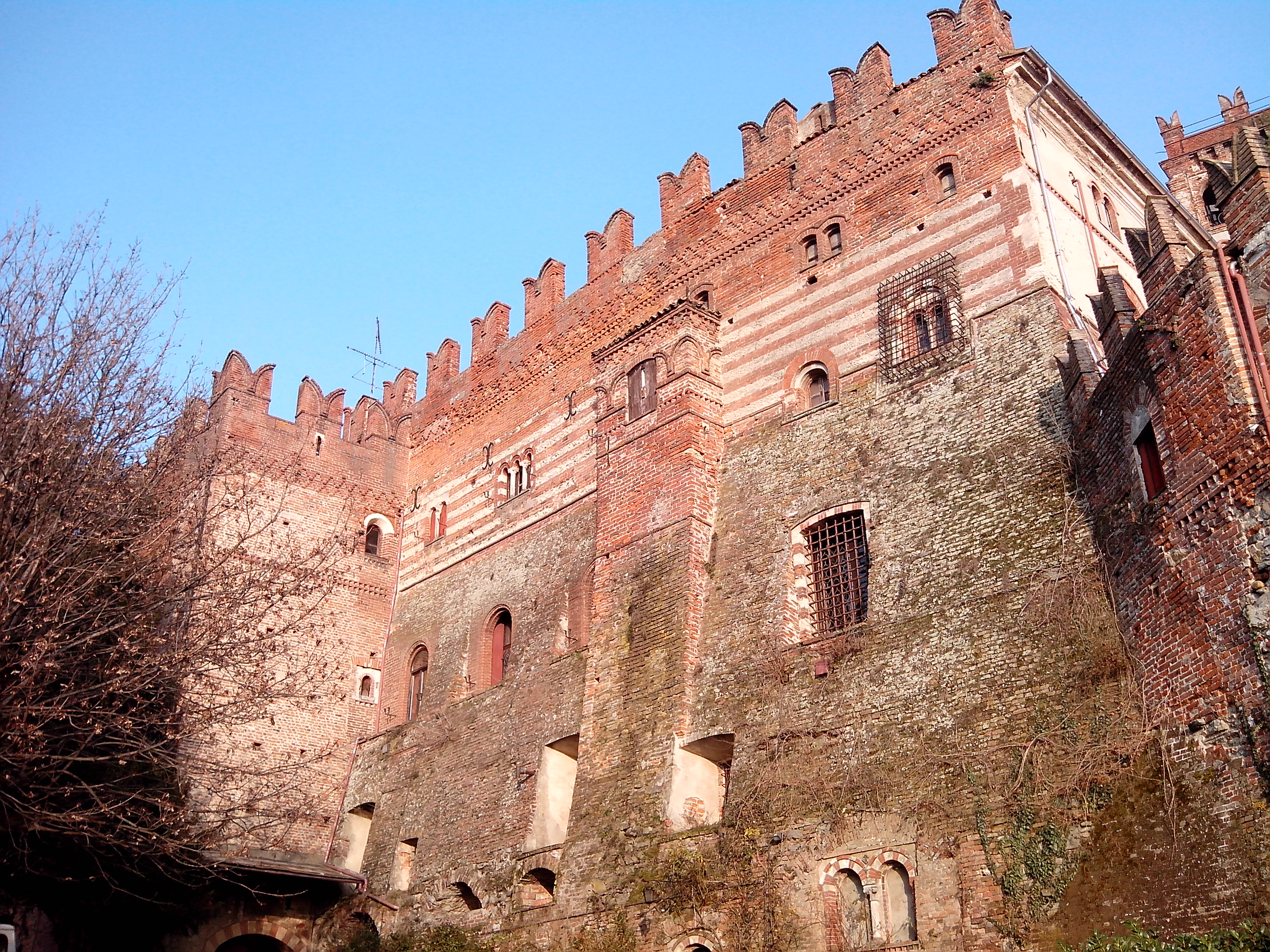

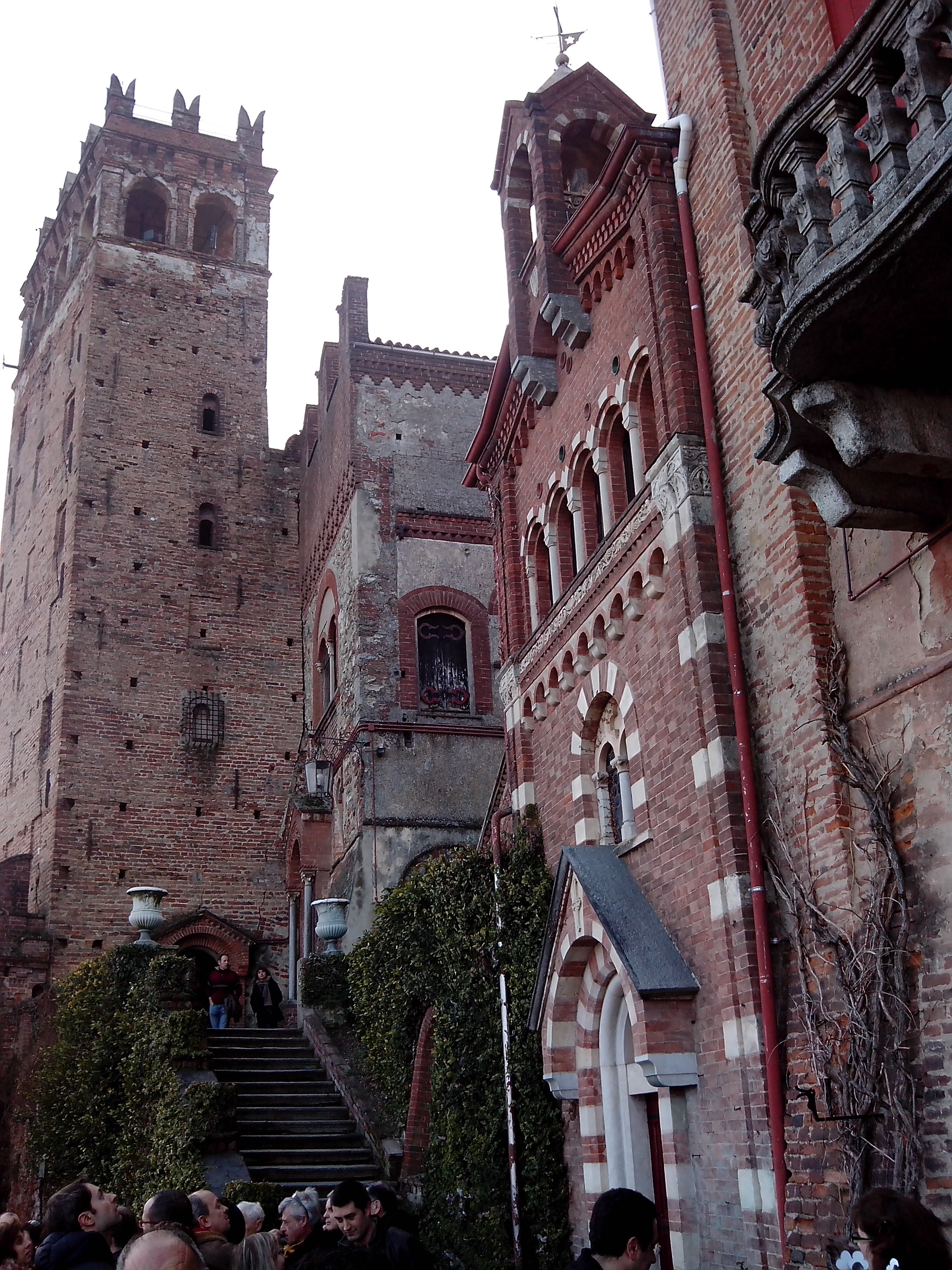

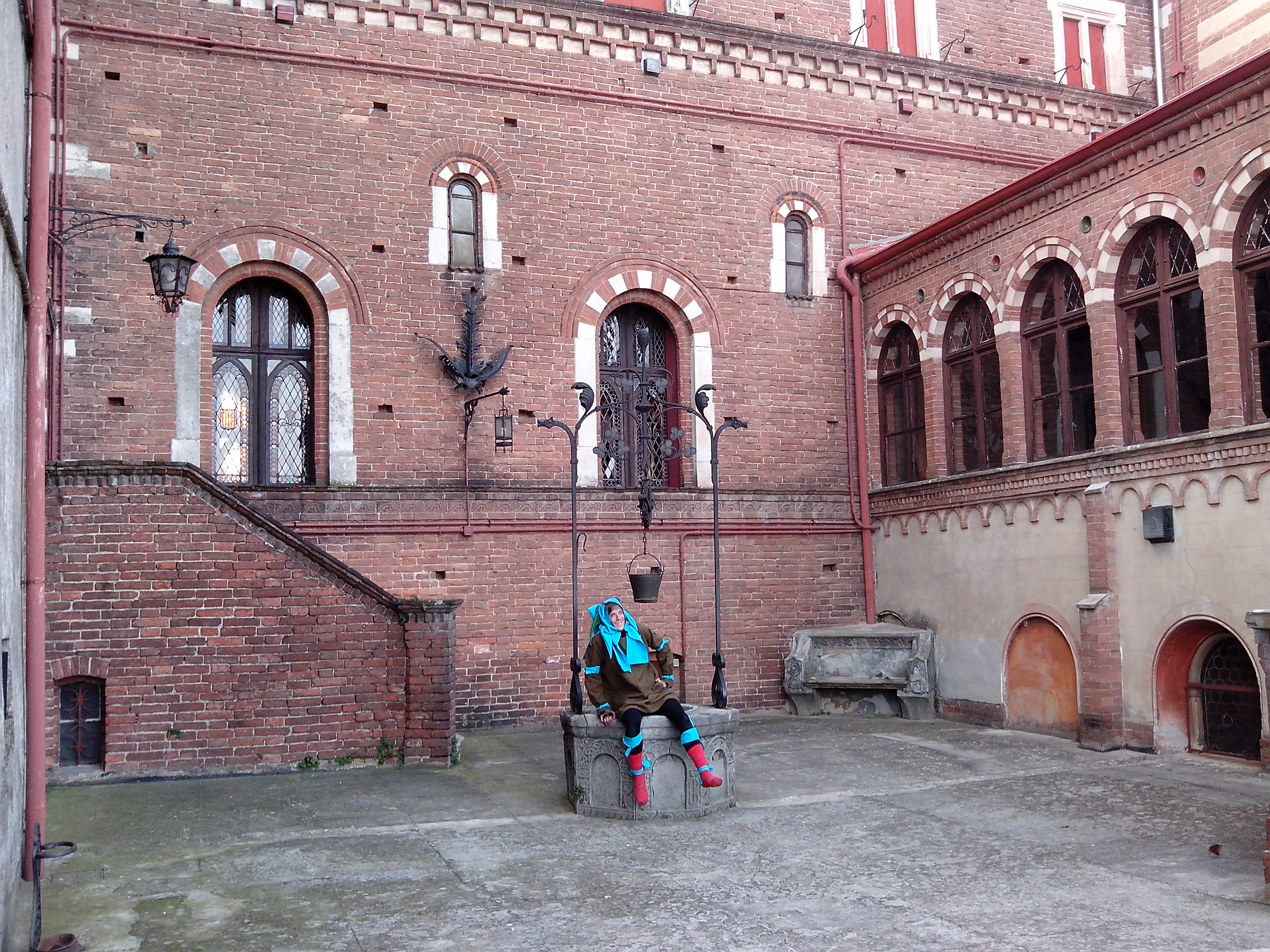
