= Bartolomeo Caravoglia =

Italian painter

Bartolommeo Caravoglia (active 1645–1682) was an Italian painter of the Baroque period. Born in Crescentino, Piedmont, he is said to have been a pupil of Guercino. He painted a Miracle of the Eucharist for the church of the Corpus Domini in Turin.

== Biography ==
Bartolommeo Caravoglia is thought to have been born in Marentino around 1616. Records show that he worked at the ducal court of Turin from 1644, where the rector of the Jesuit College introduced him to Christine of France, who made him one of the most leading artistic figures at the Savoy Court. His apprenticeship was complex, being variously influenced (from Neapolitan art to Guercino's painting). From 1645, he produced a series of works (now lost) at the Castle of Rivoli, which he worked on intermittently until 1664. He worked in the Palazzo San Giovanni in 1650 and decorated the Cappella della Compagnia di San Luca in the Turin Cathedral in 1655. In the same year, he became assistant director of the Accademia di San Luca, and was subsequently made director in 1659.

From 1660 to 1663, Caravoglia worked on the new decoration of the Royal Palace of Turin, where he produced some paintings for the Sala delle Principesse, based on an iconographic plan conceived by Emanuele Tesauro to celebrate the marriages of members of the House of Savoy to foreign consorts. These paintings, which have been partially lost, were strongly influenced by the style of the painter Jan Miel, who had been summoned to Turin a few years earlier through a refined exchange between the ducal court and the Roman cultural world. In the Diana room of the Venaria residence, Caravoglia painted a double equestrian portrait of two women (now lost), which, along with similar works by Jan Miel and Charles Dauphin, reflected the new trends in celebrity iconography developed by Caravoglia on the basis of Flemish models. In 1663, the artist joined the Compagnia di San Paolo, where he received more commissions to decorate the old Oratory than any of his contemporaries. Indeed, in the years that followed, he painted no less than seven scenes here: St. Paul and Ananias, St. Paul at the Holy Communion, St. Paul at the death of the Virgin, St. Paul led to execution, The decapitation of St. Paul and the crucifixion of St. Peter, St. Paul and St. Thecla and St. Paul exorcizes a possessed man. The works in this cycle are visibly influenced by the religious rhetoric of Charles Dauphin, with whom Caravoglia had worked at the Royal Palace.

In addition to the works at the Royal Palace, Caravoglia collaborated with Dauphin over three paintings for the Cathedral of Turin between 1655 and 1663. Church commissions dominated Caravoglia's work towards the end of his career, both in Turin, where he painted the Miracle of the Eucharist in the church of Corpus Domini, reputedly dating from as early as 1667, and in Cuneo, where he painted his splendid Circumcision in the church of Santa Maria in 1645. Two paintings in the cathedral of Cuneo have recently been attributed to Caravoglia. These are The death of St. Joseph, previously attributed to Nuvolone, and Job derided. Caravoglia also painted countless paintings for minor centres and in the Vercelli area (The Virgin and saints, 1667, church of SS. Francesco e Bernardino, Cavaglià; Circumcision, 1675, church of San Bernardino, Crescentino; Christ on the cross, 1676, Confraternita della Misericordia, Livorno Ferraris). This suggests that the artist may have run a second workshop in Vercelli alongside the one in Turin. Caravoglia died in Turin in 1691.
