= Palazzolo Vercellese =

- Comune
- Comune di Palazzolo Vercellese
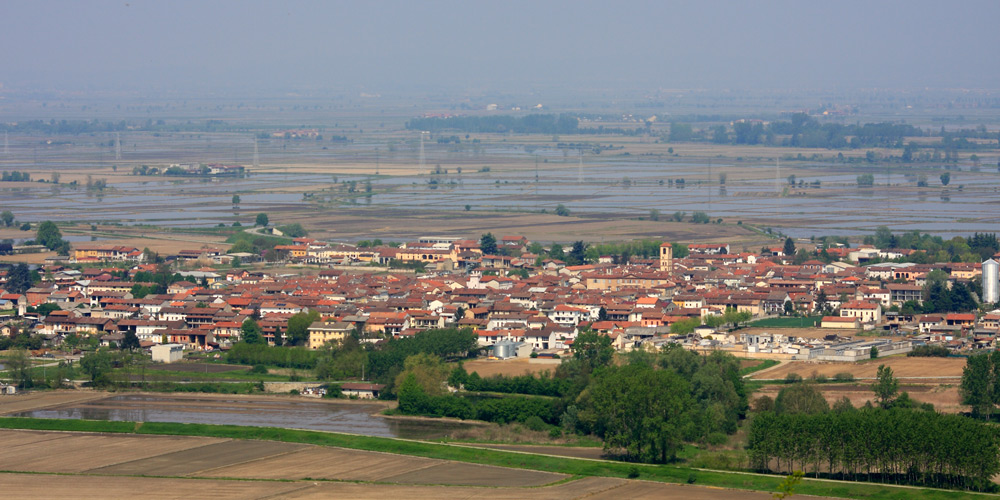
- Palazzolo Vercellese

- Location within Italy Location within Piedmont
- Coordinates: 45°11′N 8°14′E
- Country: Italy
- Region: Piedmont
- Province: Province of Vercelli (VC)

Government
  - Mayor: Emiliano Guarnieri

Area
  - Total: 13.9 km^{2} (5.4 sq mi)

Population (Dec. 2004)
  - Total: 1,348
  - Density: 97.0/km^{2} (251/sq mi)
- Time zone: UTC+1 (CET)
  - Summer (DST): UTC+2 (CEST)
- Postal code: 13040
- Dialing code: 0161

Palazzolo Vercellese (Palasseu in Piedmontese) is a comune (municipality) in the Province of Vercelli in the Italian region Piedmont, located about 45 kilometres (28 mi) northeast of Turin and about 20 kilometres (12 mi) southwest of Vercelli. As of 31 December 2004, it had a population of 1,348 and an area of 13.9 square kilometres (5.4 mi^{2}).

Palazzolo Vercellese borders the following municipalities: Camino, Fontanetto Po, Gabiano, and Trino.

== Demographic evolution ==
Historical population

Year	Pop.	±%
1861	2,084	—
1871	2,335	+12.0%
1881	2,616	+12.0%
1901	2,957	+13.0%
1911	2,717	−8.1%

Year	Pop.	±%
1921	2,371	−12.7%
1931	2,195	−7.4%
1936	2,148	−2.1%
1951	2,022	−5.9%
1961	1,922	−4.9%

Year	Pop.	±%
1971	1,678	−12.7%
1981	1,457	−13.2%
1991	1,325	−9.1%
2001	1,328	+0.2%

Source: Data from ISTAT
