= Trino =

Trino Trin
- Comune
- Comune di Trino
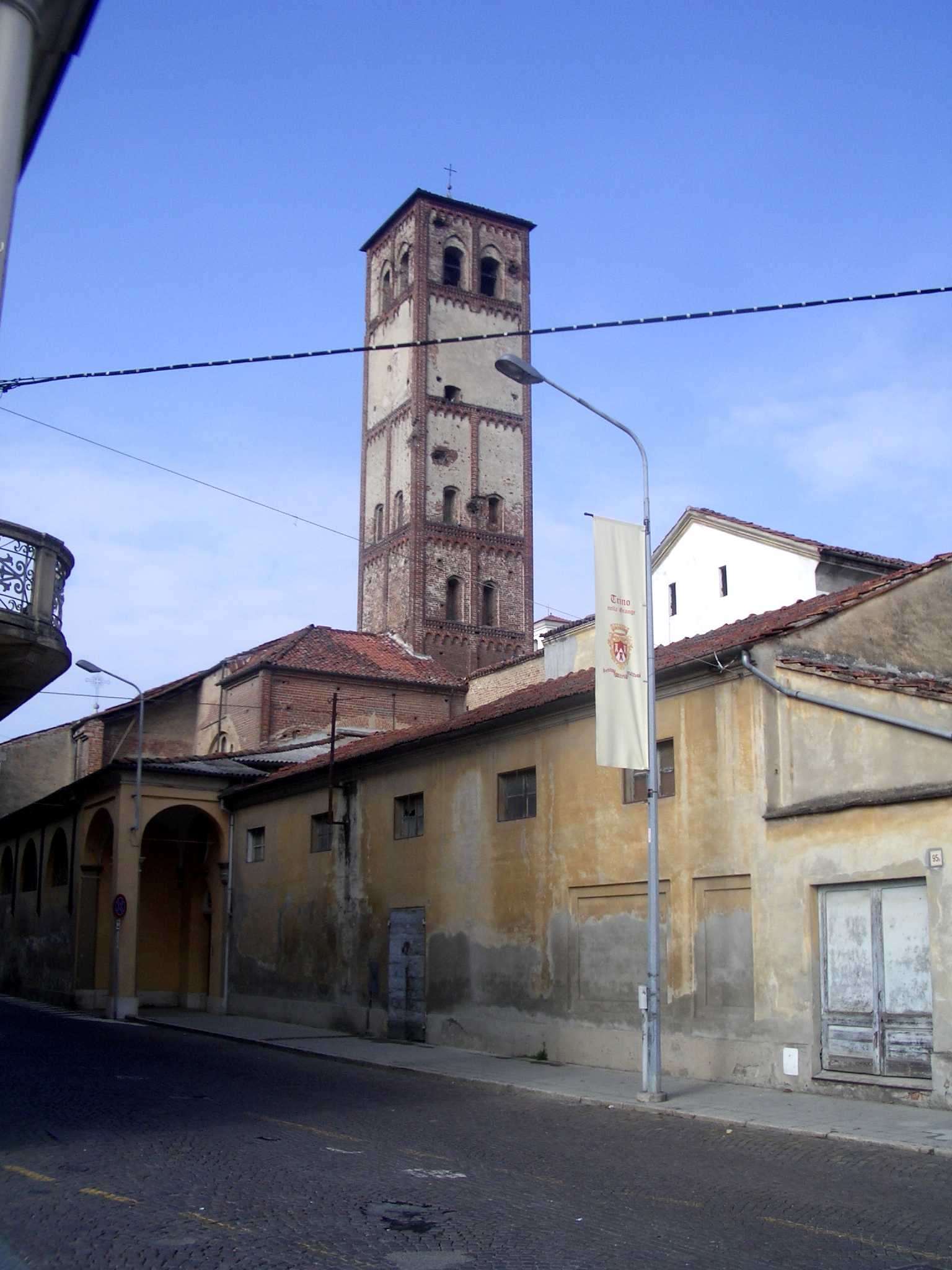
- View of the town with campanile of St. Dominic Church

- Coat of arms

- Location within Italy Location within Piedmont
- Coordinates: 45°12′N 8°18′E
- Country: Italy
- Region: Piedmont
- Province: Vercelli (VC)
- Frazioni: Leri Cavour, Lucedio, Robella

Government
  - Mayor: Daniele Pane

Area
  - Total: 70.6 km^{2} (27.3 sq mi)
- Elevation: 120 m (390 ft)

Population (31 December 2012)
  - Total: 7,490
  - Density: 106/km^{2} (275/sq mi)
- Demonym: Trinesi
- Time zone: UTC+1 (CET)
  - Summer (DST): UTC+2 (CEST)
- Postal code: 13039
- Dialing code: 0161
- Website: Official website

Trino (Piedmontese: Trin) is a comune (municipality) in the Province of Vercelli in the Italian region Piedmont, located about 50 kilometres (31 mi) northeast of Turin and about 15 kilometres (9 mi) southwest of Vercelli, at the foot of the Montferrat hills.

Trino borders the following municipalities: Bianzè, Camino, Costanzana, Fontanetto Po, Livorno Ferraris, Morano sul Po, Palazzolo Vercellese, Ronsecco, and Tricerro.

Trino was the site of Enrico Fermi Nuclear Power Plant. The Romanesque church of San Michele in Insula (built in the 10th–11th centuries) has 12th-century frescoes. The Lucedio Abbey is also located in the municipal territory.

== Main sights ==
=== Monuments ===
- Church of San Michele in Insula
- Church of San Bartolomeo
- Church of San Domenico
- Church of Santa Caterina d'Alessandria
- Church of San Lorenzo
- Church of the Most Holy Name of Mary known as Madonna delle Vigne
- Lucedio Abbey
- Cavourian estate in Leri Cavour
- Arch of the Cementi Buzzi cableway

=== Museums ===
- Gian Andrea Irico Civic Museum
- Area907

== Twin towns ==
- Chauvigny, France, since 1961
- Geisenheim, Germany, since 1974
- Banfora, Burkina Faso, since 1999
- Garbagna Novarese, Italy, since 2024
- Rio Saliceto, Italy, 2024
