= Coniolo =

- Comune
- Comune di Coniolo
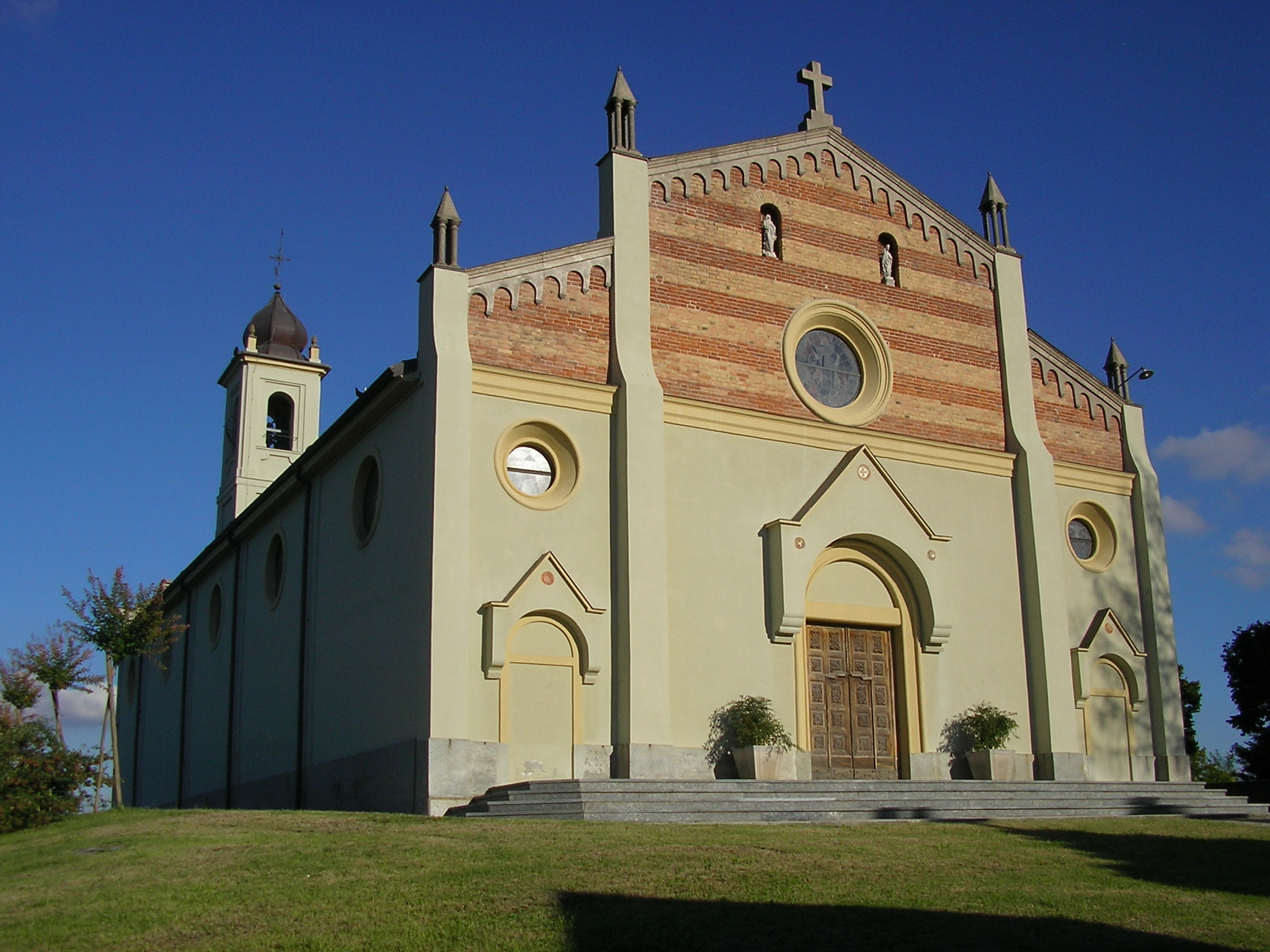

- Location within Italy Location within Piedmont
- Coordinates: 45°8′57″N 8°22′19″E
- Country: Italy
- Region: Piedmont
- Province: Province of Alessandria (AL)

Government
  - Mayor: Giovanni Spinoglio (elected 2004-06-13)

Area
  - Total: 10.35 km^{2} (4.00 sq mi)
- Elevation: 252 m (827 ft)

Population (2005)
  - Total: 444
  - Density: 42.9/km^{2} (111/sq mi)
- Demonym: Coniolesi
- Time zone: UTC+1 (CET)
  - Summer (DST): UTC+2 (CEST)
- Postal code: 15030
- Dialing code: 0142
- Patron saint: Santa Maria Assunta
- Saint day: 15 August

Coniolo is a comune (municipality) in the Province of Alessandria in the Italian region of Piedmont, located about 50 kilometres (31 mi) east of Turin and about 35 kilometres (22 mi) northwest of Alessandria.

As of 31 December 2004, it had a population of 440 and an area of 10.3 square kilometres (4.0 mi^{2}).

Coniolo's closest neighbours are:

- to the south and east: Casale Monferrato;
- to the north: Morano sul Po;
- to the west: Pontestura.

== Main sights ==
- Ethnographic Mining Museum

== Demographic evolution ==
Historical population

Year	Pop.	±%
1861	835	—
1871	892	+6.8%
1881	910	+2.0%
1901	1,014	+11.4%
1911	1,188	+17.2%

Year	Pop.	±%
1921	1,019	−14.2%
1931	895	−12.2%
1936	846	−5.5%
1951	761	−10.0%
1961	621	−18.4%

Year	Pop.	±%
1971	535	−13.8%
1981	428	−20.0%
1991	398	−7.0%
2001	422	+6.0%

Source: Data from ISTAT
