= Solonghello =

- Comune
- Comune di Solonghello
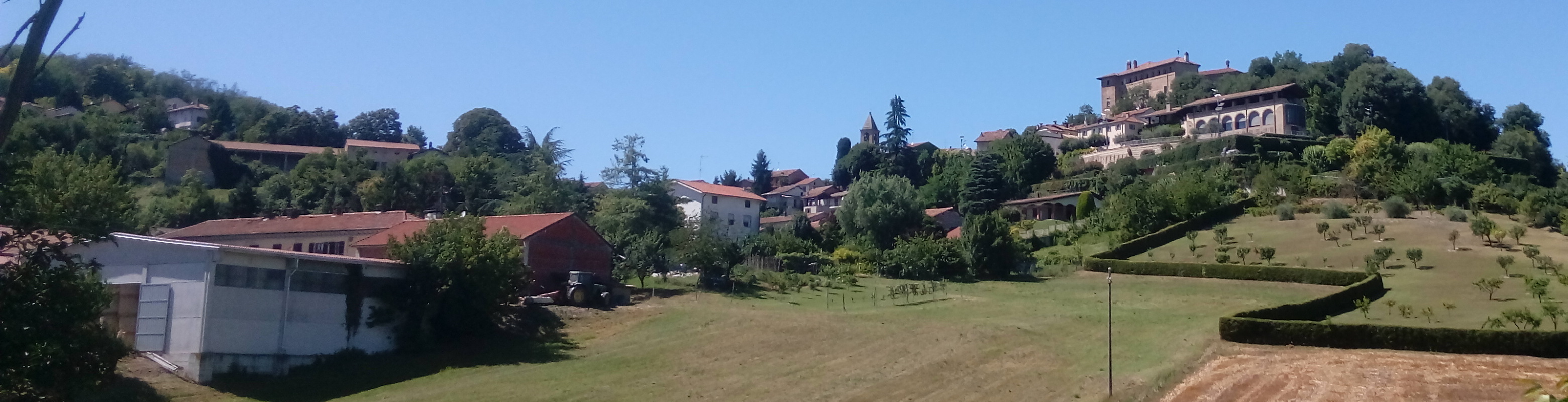

- Location within Italy Location within Piedmont
- Coordinates: 45°8′N 8°17′E
- Country: Italy
- Region: Piedmont
- Province: Province of Alessandria (AL)

Area
  - Total: 4.9 km^{2} (1.9 sq mi)

Population (Dec. 2004)
  - Total: 234
  - Density: 48/km^{2} (120/sq mi)
- Time zone: UTC+1 (CET)
  - Summer (DST): UTC+2 (CEST)
- Postal code: 15020
- Dialing code: 0142

Solonghello is a comune (municipality) in the Province of Alessandria in the Italian region Piedmont, located about 45 kilometres (28 mi) east of Turin and about 35 kilometres (22 mi) northwest of Alessandria. As of 31 December 2004, it had a population of 234 and an area of 4.9 square kilometres (1.9 mi^{2}).

Solonghello borders the following municipalities: Camino, Mombello Monferrato, Pontestura, and Serralunga di Crea.

== Demographic evolution ==
Historical population

Year	Pop.	±%
1861	824	—
1871	913	+10.8%
1881	1,053	+15.3%
1901	964	−8.5%
1911	865	−10.3%

Year	Pop.	±%
1921	784	−9.4%
1931	811	+3.4%
1936	694	−14.4%
1951	606	−12.7%
1961	490	−19.1%

Year	Pop.	±%
1971	367	−25.1%
1981	305	−16.9%
1991	254	−16.7%
2001	245	−3.5%

Source: Data from ISTAT
