= Gabiano Castle =

Castle in Gabiano, Piedmont, Italy

- Castello di Gabiano
- Gabiano, Piedmont, Italy
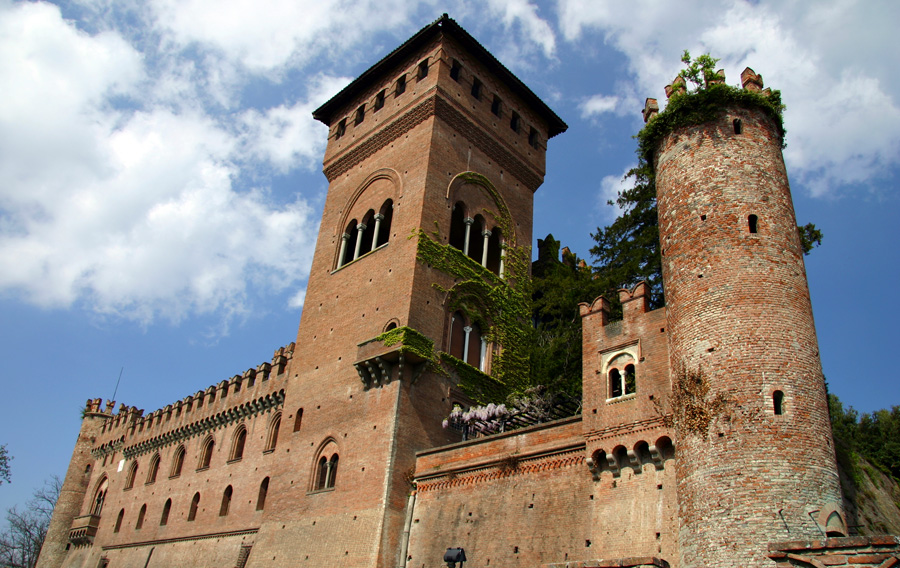
- Gabiano Castle in 2008

Site information
- Type: Castle

Location
- Coordinates: 45°09′34.79″N 8°11′33.36″E

Gabiano Castle (Italian: Castello di Gabiano) is a castle located in Gabiano, Piedmont, Italy.

== History ==
The castle dates back to the 9th century when it was established as a fortification to control trade routes crossing the Po river towards Northern Europe. In 805, Charlemagne donated it to Frontinus, Archbishop of Vercelli, through the decree Cortem Magnam Nomine Gabianam. The fortress, connected to a ricetto, originally consisted of a sturdy barracks built on the estate of one of the wealthiest landowners, surrounded by a defensive wall. During the Renaissance, it became the property of the dynasties ruling over Monferrat, including the Montiglio, the Aleramici, the Paleologi, and the Gonzaga.

Finally, in the 17th century, it passed to the Durazzo family. In 1624, Agostino Durazzo was granted the village and its castle as a fief, along with the title of Marquis. From that moment, the Durazzo family's history became inextricably linked with that of the castle, with the family overseeing its embellishment and the enhancement of the local winemaking tradition.

After a 19th-century restoration that erased its original appearance as a fortified stronghold with towers, the castle underwent a meticulous restoration beginning in 1907. This effort was commissioned by its owners, Giacomo Durazzo Pallavicini and Matilde Giustiniani, and entrusted to architect Lamberto Cusani. Cusani carried out a historically faithful reconstruction of the castle and the medieval village, including its agricultural and winemaking buildings, skillfully applying the teachings of Alfredo d'Andrade, the architect behind the Borgo Medioevale in Turin, created for the 1884 Italian General Exhibition.

== Gallery ==
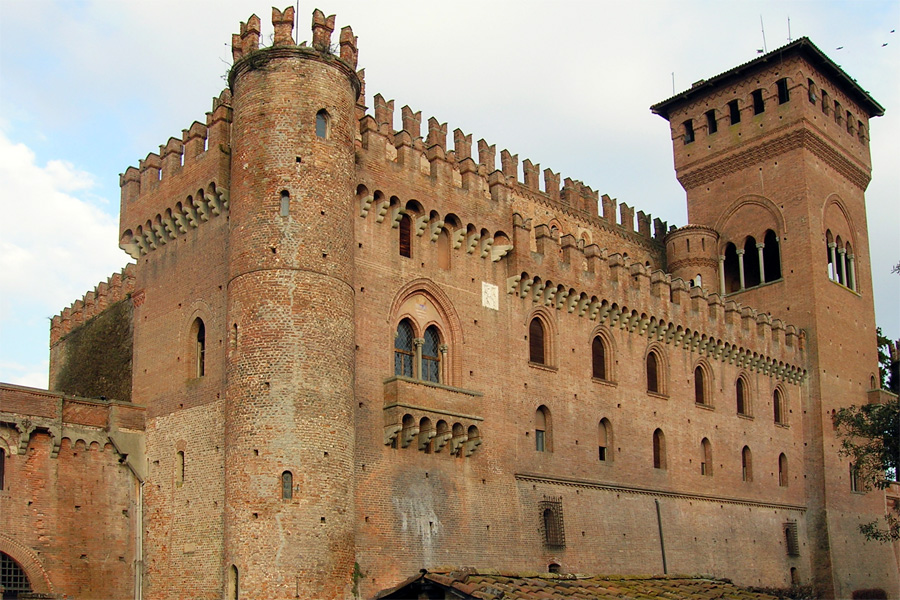

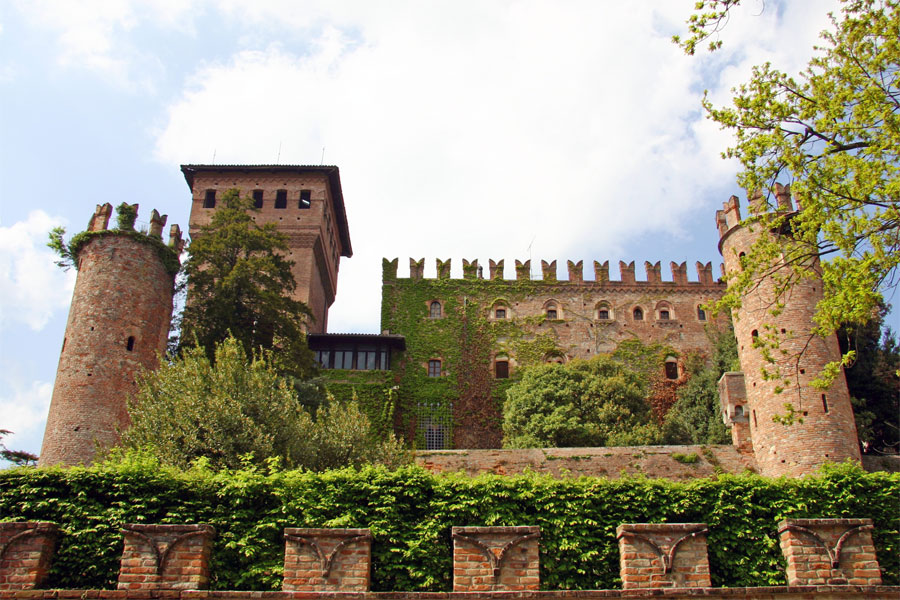
