= Pontestura =

- Comune
- Comune di Pontestura
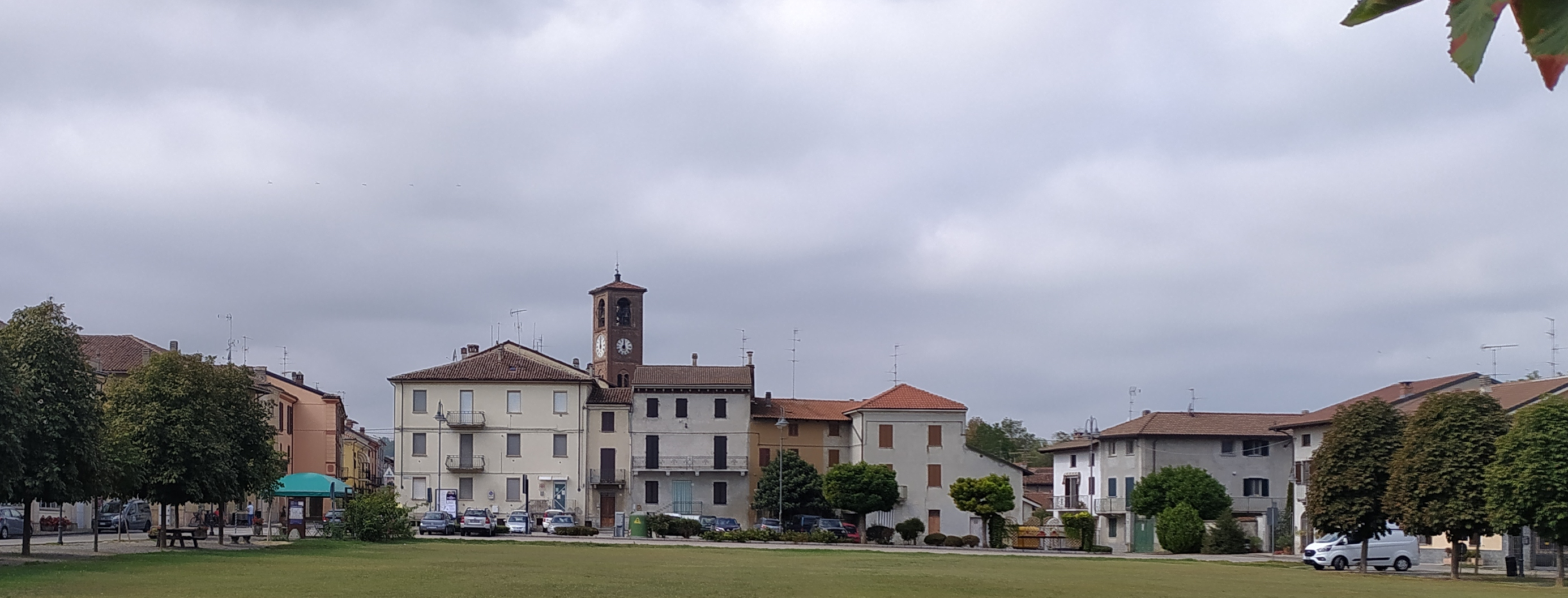

- Coat of arms

- Location within Italy Location within Piedmont
- Coordinates: 45°8′36″N 8°20′3″E
- Country: Italy
- Region: Piedmont
- Province: Province of Alessandria (AL)
- Frazioni: Quarti, Castagnone, Rocchetta

Government
  - Mayor: Franco Berra

Area
  - Total: 18.87 km^{2} (7.29 sq mi)
- Elevation: 140 m (460 ft)

Population (31 December 2010)
  - Total: 1,485
  - Density: 78.70/km^{2} (203.8/sq mi)
- Demonym: Pontesturesi
- Time zone: UTC+1 (CET)
  - Summer (DST): UTC+2 (CEST)
- Postal code: 15027
- Dialing code: 0142
- Patron saint: Saint Agatha
- Saint day: 5 February

Pontestura (in Piedmontese Pont da Stura) is a commune with a population of 1,539 in the Province of Alessandria in the Italian region Piedmont. It is located on the right bank of the Po River about 50 kilometres (31 mi) east of Turin and about 10 kilometres (6 mi) west of Casale Monferrato and borders the following municipalities: Camino, Casale Monferrato, Cereseto, Coniolo, Morano sul Po, Ozzano Monferrato, Serralunga di Crea, and Solonghello.

John IV, Marquis of Montferrat from 1445 to 1464, was born in the castle of Pontestura in 1413.
