= Moncestino =

- Comune
- Comune di Moncestino
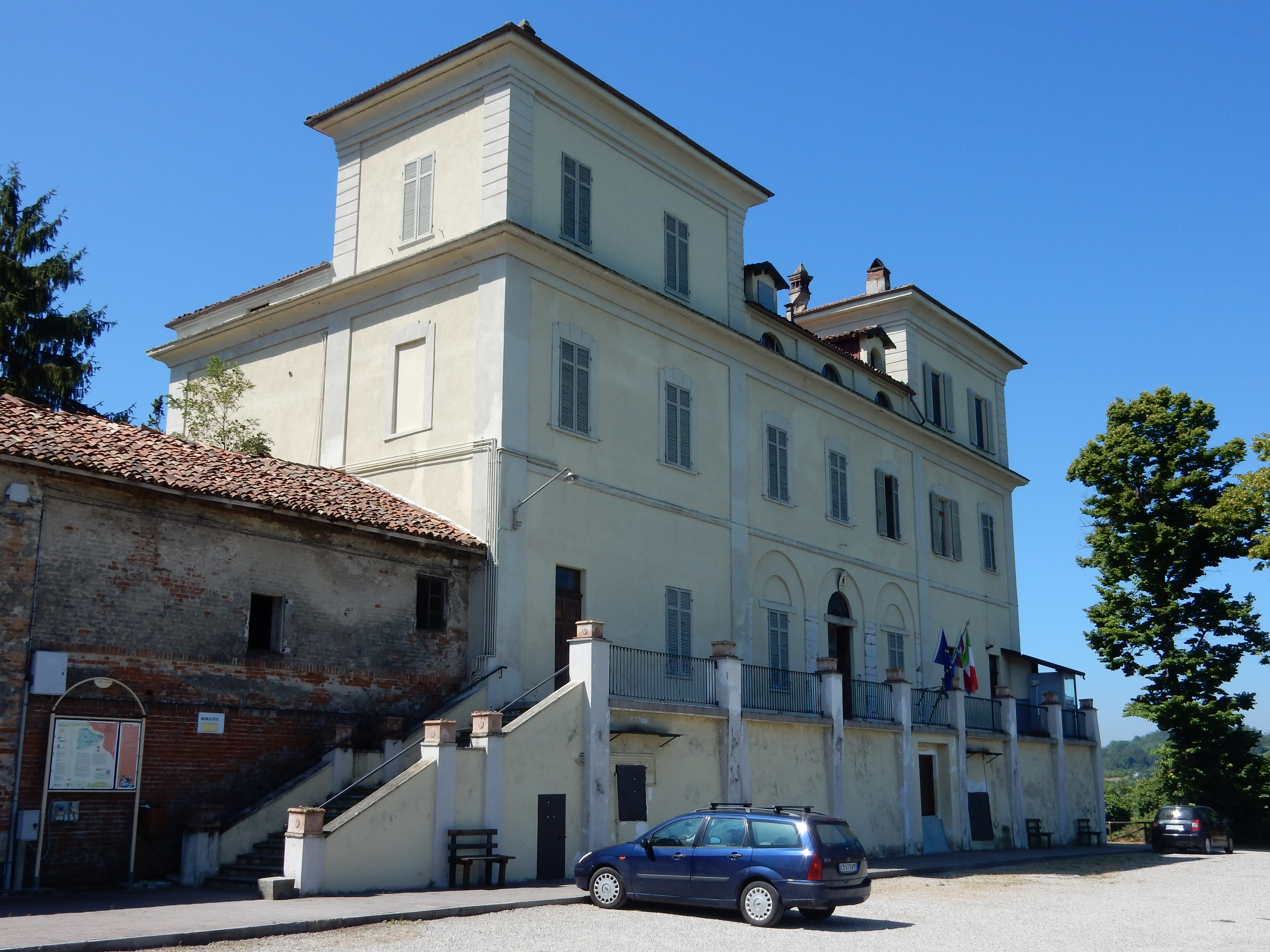

- Location within Italy Location within Piedmont
- Coordinates: 45°9′N 8°10′E
- Country: Italy
- Region: Piedmont
- Province: Province of Alessandria (AL)

Area
  - Total: 6.4 km^{2} (2.5 sq mi)

Population (Dec. 2004)
  - Total: 238
  - Density: 37/km^{2} (96/sq mi)
- Time zone: UTC+1 (CET)
  - Summer (DST): UTC+2 (CEST)
- Postal code: 15020
- Dialing code: 0142

Moncestino (Piedmontese: Monsëstin) is a comune (municipality) in the Province of Alessandria in the Italian region Piedmont, located about 40 kilometres (25 mi) east of Turin and about 45 kilometres (28 mi) northwest of Alessandria. As of 31 December 2004, it had a population of 238 and an area of 6.4 square kilometres (2.5 mi^{2}).

Moncestino borders the following municipalities: Crescentino, Fontanetto Po, Gabiano, Verrua Savoia, and Villamiroglio.

== Demographic evolution ==
Historical population

Year	Pop.	±%
1861	930	—
1871	955	+2.7%
1881	920	−3.7%
1901	759	−17.5%
1911	746	−1.7%

Year	Pop.	±%
1921	660	−11.5%
1931	587	−11.1%
1936	541	−7.8%
1951	506	−6.5%
1961	451	−10.9%

Year	Pop.	±%
1971	357	−20.8%
1981	231	−35.3%
1991	229	−0.9%
2001	226	−1.3%

Source: Data from ISTAT
