= Pont-de-Chéruy =

- Commune
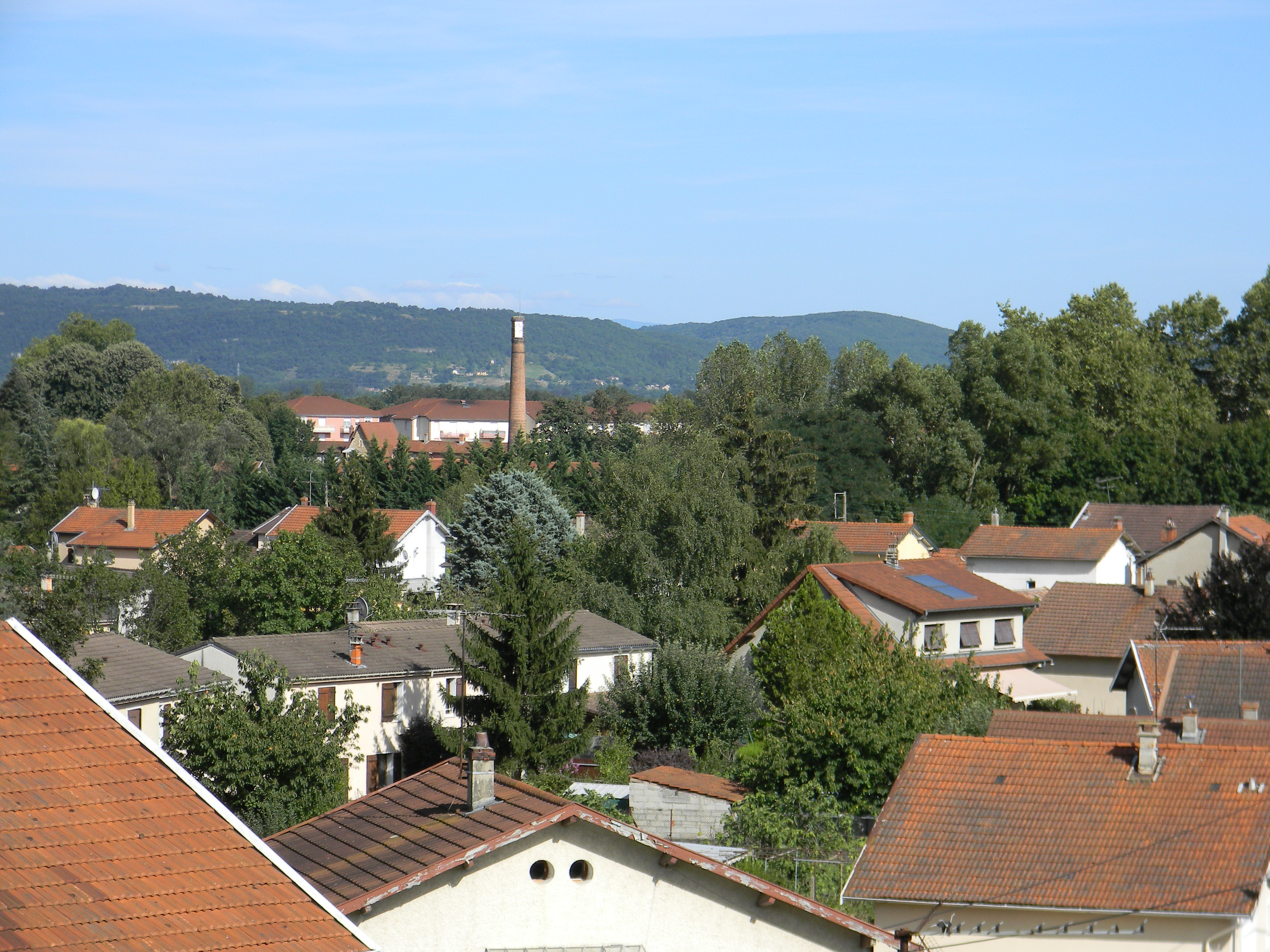
- A general view of Pont-de-Chéruy

- Coat of arms
- Location of Pont-de-Chéruy
- Location within France Location within Auvergne-Rhône-Alpes
- Coordinates: 45°45′05″N 5°10′25″E
- Country: France
- Region: Auvergne-Rhône-Alpes
- Department: Isère
- Arrondissement: La Tour-du-Pin
- Canton: Charvieu-Chavagneux

Government
  - Mayor (2020–2026): Franck Bron
- Area^{1}: 2.51 km^{2} (0.97 sq mi)
- Highest elevation: 236 m (774 ft)
- Lowest elevation: 196 m (643 ft)
- Population (2023): 6,302
  - Density: 2,510/km^{2} (6,500/sq mi)
- Time zone: UTC+01:00 (CET)
  - Summer (DST): UTC+02:00 (CEST)
- INSEE/Postal code: 38316 /38230
- ^{1} French Land Register data, which excludes lakes, ponds, glaciers > 1 km^{2} (0.386 sq mi or 247 acres) and river estuaries.

Pont-de-Chéruy (French pronunciation: [pɔ̃ də ʃeʁɥi]) is a commune in the Isère department in southeastern France.

== Geography ==
Pont-de-Chéruy is located in the department of Isère and in the region of Auvergne-Rhone-Alps, and is an outer suburb of Lyon. The Bourbre flows north through the middle of the commune and crosses the town.

== Population ==
The population has evolved according to the following table:

Historical population

Year	Pop.	±% p.a.
1872	846	—
1876	860	+0.41%
1881	941	+1.82%
1886	1,000	+1.22%
1891	1,186	+3.47%
1896	1,402	+3.40%
1901	1,600	+2.68%
1906	1,812	+2.52%
1911	1,951	+1.49%
1921	2,035	+0.42%
1926	2,189	+1.47%
1931	2,231	+0.38%
1936	2,062	−1.56%

Year	Pop.	±% p.a.
1946	2,119	+0.27%
1954	2,224	+0.61%
1962	2,997	+3.80%
1968	3,561	+2.92%
1975	3,853	+1.13%
1982	3,849	−0.01%
1990	4,700	+2.53%
1999	4,540	−0.38%
2007	4,842	+0.81%
2012	5,233	+1.57%
2017	5,772	+1.98%
2023	6,302	+1.47%

Source: EHESS and INSEE (1968-2023)

== Health centers and schools ==
In 2009 there were 1 medical center and 3 pharmacies.

Since 2009 Pont-de-Chéruy has 2 maternal schools and 1 elementary school, 1 high school and 2 lyceums.

== Public and private companies ==
Regarding the establishments of services to the population since 2009, there are 1 office of public treasury/tax, 1 unemployment office, 1 police station, 1 post office, various banks, 1 mortuary and multiple private companies of industrial, agricultural, catering and real estate services.

== Image gallery ==
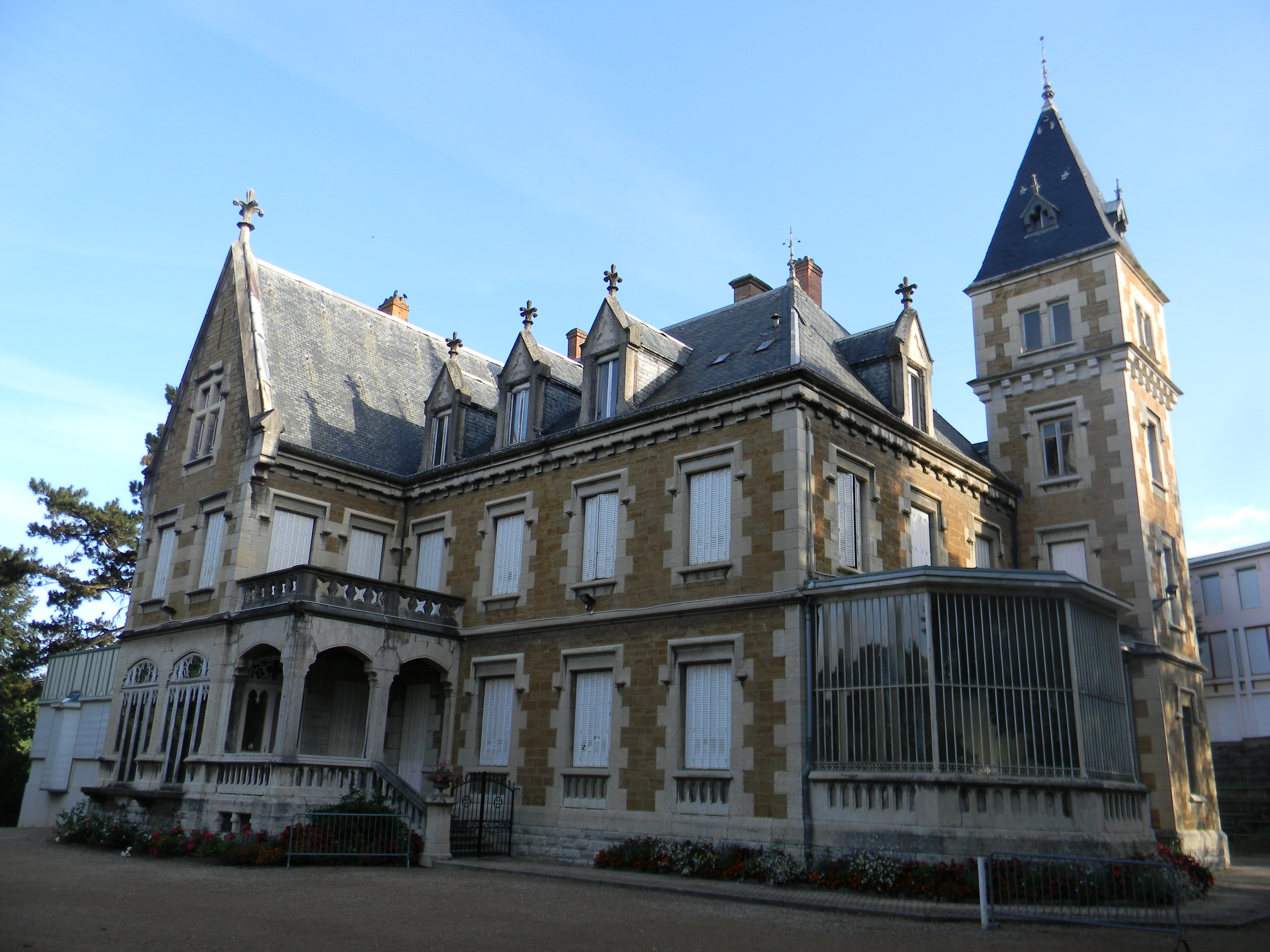
Grammont castle

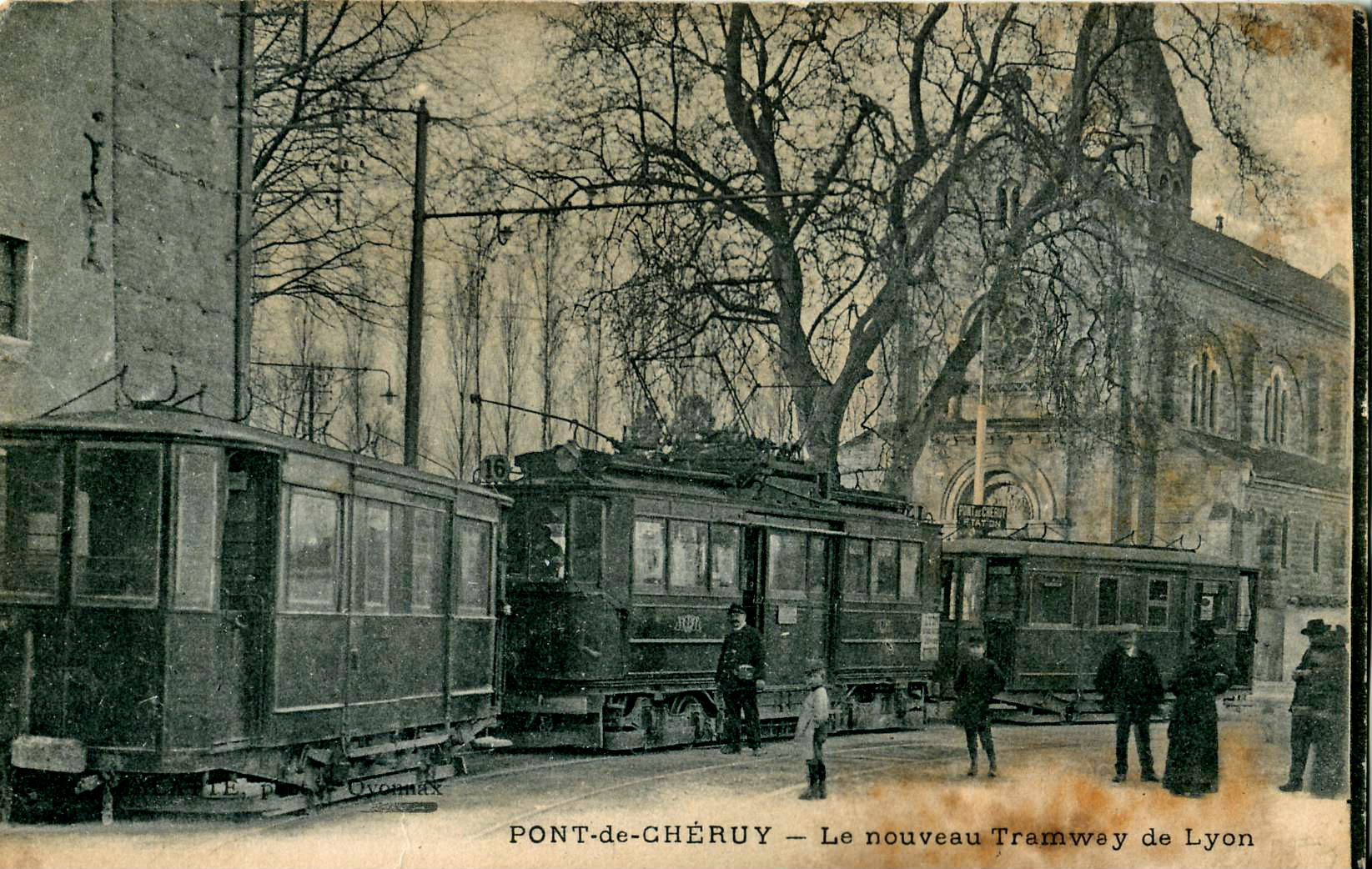
Postcard of the new Lyon tramway, Church Square, c. 1920s

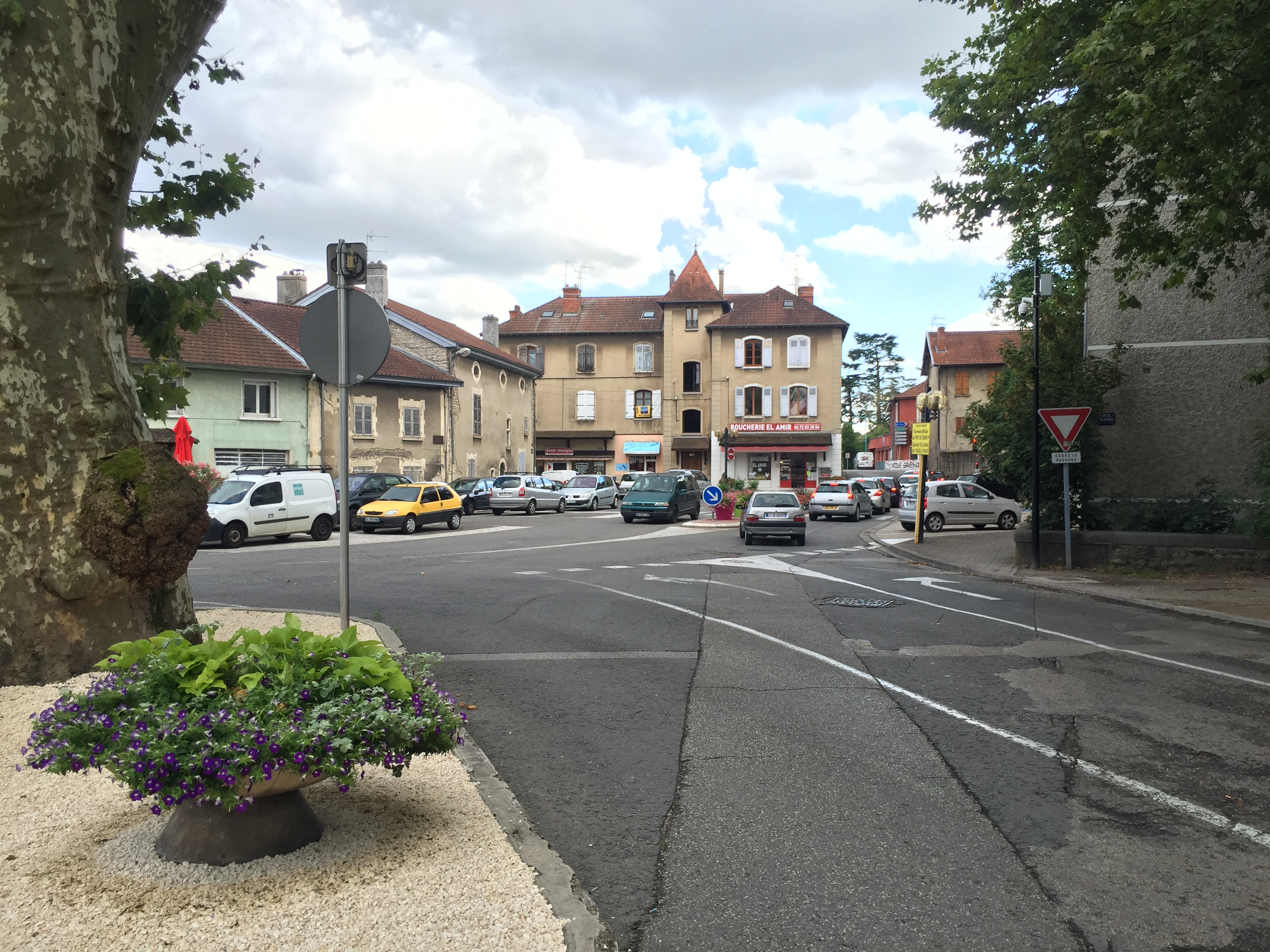
Place René Duquaire

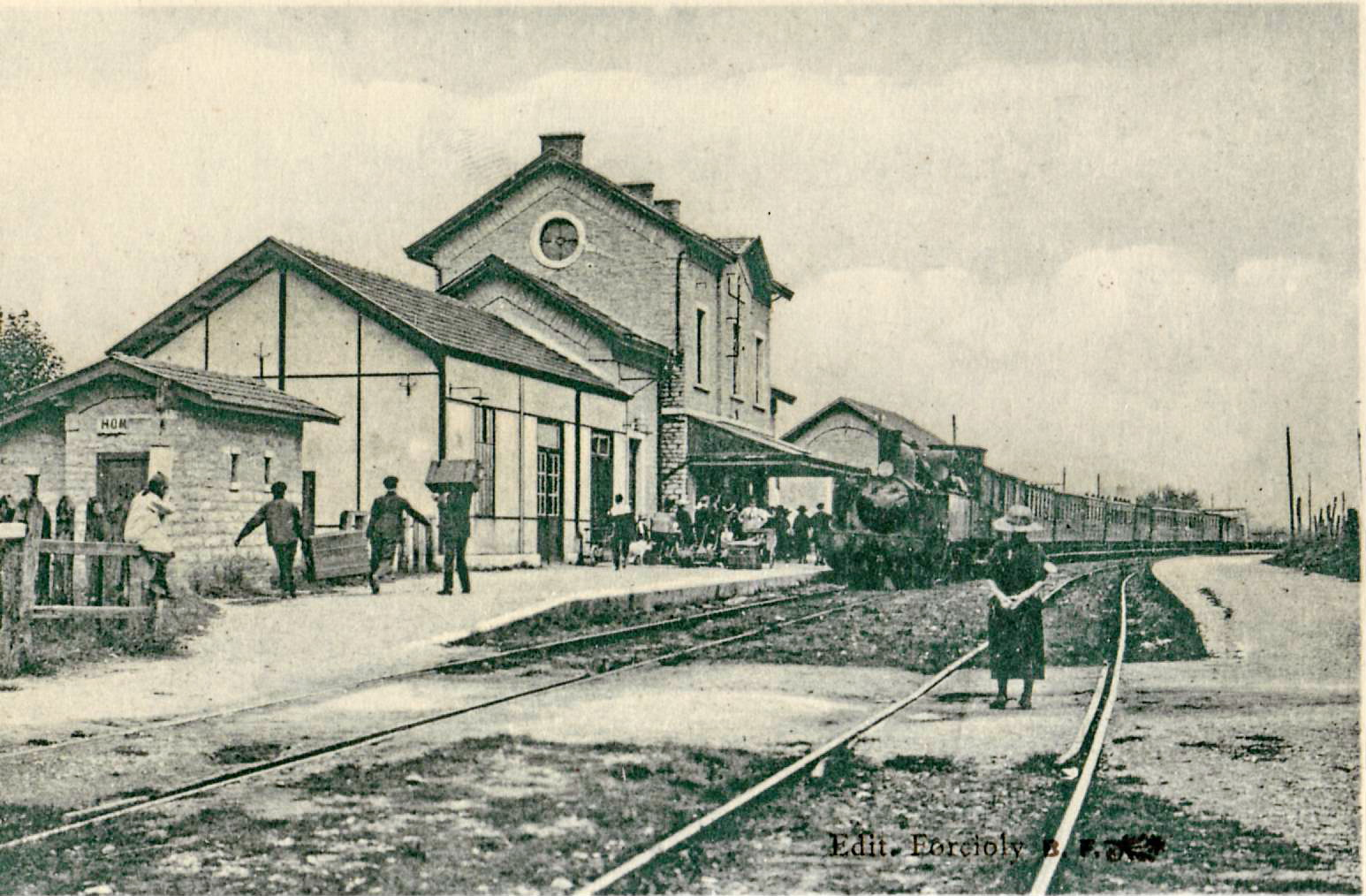
Train Station, c. 1910s

== Twin towns ==
Pont-de-Chéruy is twinned with:

- Bucha, Ukraine, since 2016
- Livorno Ferraris, Italy, since 2001

== See also ==
- Communes of the Isère department
