= Morano sul Po =

- Comune
- Comune di Morano sul Po
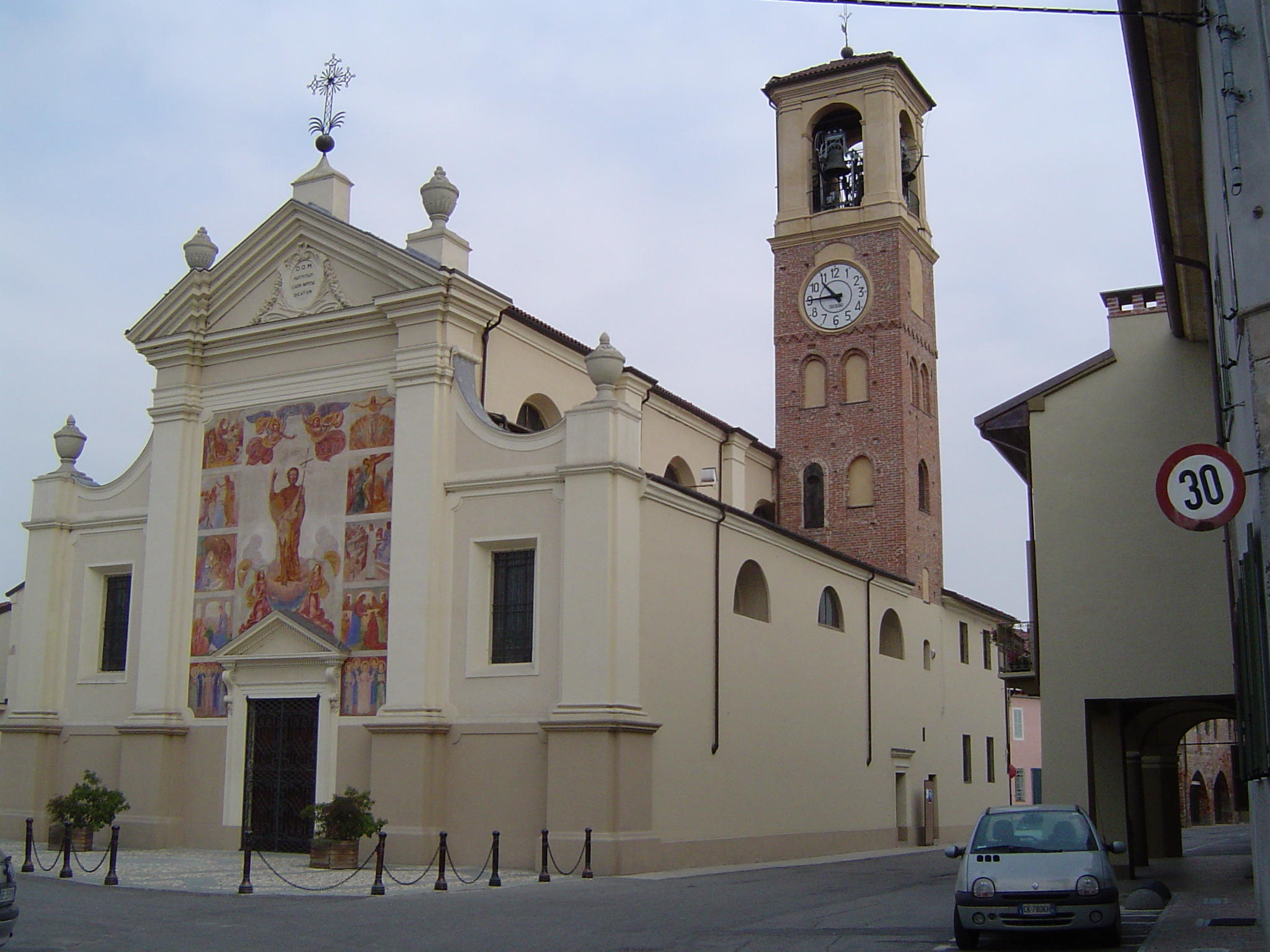
- Parish church of St. John the Baptist.

- Coat of arms

- Location within Italy Location within Piedmont
- Coordinates: 45°10′6″N 8°22′2″E
- Country: Italy
- Region: Piedmont
- Province: Alessandria (AL)
- Frazioni: Due Sture, Pobietto

Government
  - Mayor: Enzo Piccaluga (2002-2012); Mauro Rossino (2012-2017); Luca Ferrari (2017- in office)

Area
  - Total: 17.69 km^{2} (6.83 sq mi)
- Elevation: 123 m (404 ft)

Population (31 December 2011)
  - Total: 1,530
  - Density: 86.5/km^{2} (224/sq mi)
- Demonym: Moranesi
- Time zone: UTC+1 (CET)
  - Summer (DST): UTC+2 (CEST)
- Postal code: 15025
- Dialing code: 0142
- Patron saint: John the Baptist
- Saint day: First Sunday in September

Morano sul Po (in Piedmontese Muran) is a comune in the province of Alessandria, Piedmont, northwestern Italy.

It is about 50 kilometres (31 mi) east of the regional capital Turin and about 35 kilometres (22 mi) northwest of the provincial capital Alessandria. Its immediate neighbours are: Balzola, Camino, Casale Monferrato, Coniolo, Costanzana, Pontestura, and Trino.

== Main sights ==
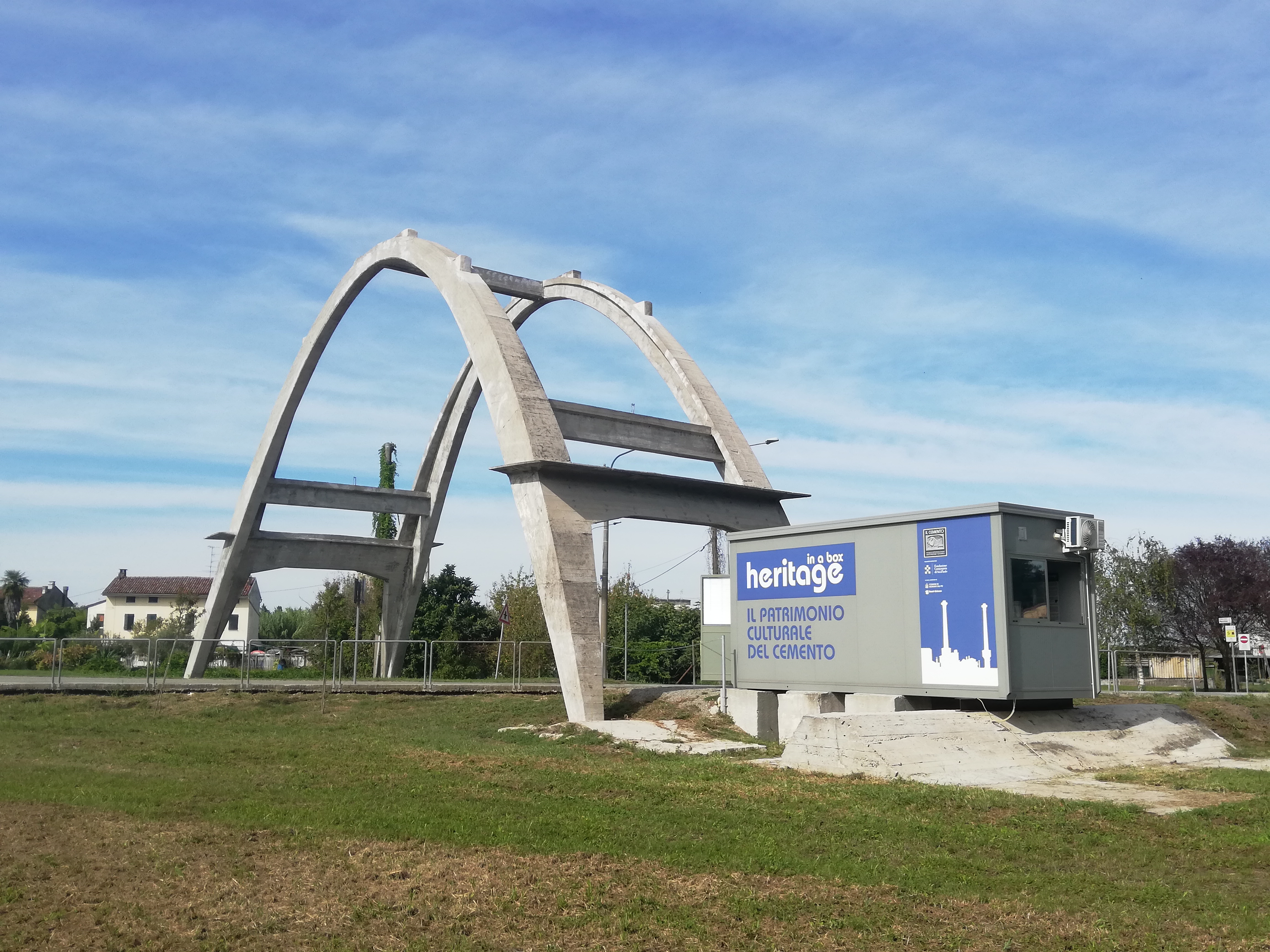
The Morano's Parabolic Arch

=== Monuments ===
- Parish church of San Giovanni Battista
- Church of San Pietro Martire
- Church of the Santa Trinità
- Church of the Consolata or Madonna del Ceppo
- Chapel of San Rocco
- Church of San Giovanni Battista in Due Sture
- Church of San San Nicola in Pobietto
- Ricreatorio parrocchiale
- House of the Arches
- Town Hall
- Morano's Parabolic Arch

=== Archaeological site ===
- Final Bronze Age necropolis in Pobietto

=== Museums ===
- Museum of peasant civilization and rice cultivation in Pobietto
- HIAB Heritage in a Box next to the Morano's Parabolic Arch
