= Crescentino =

- Comune
- Comune di Crescentino
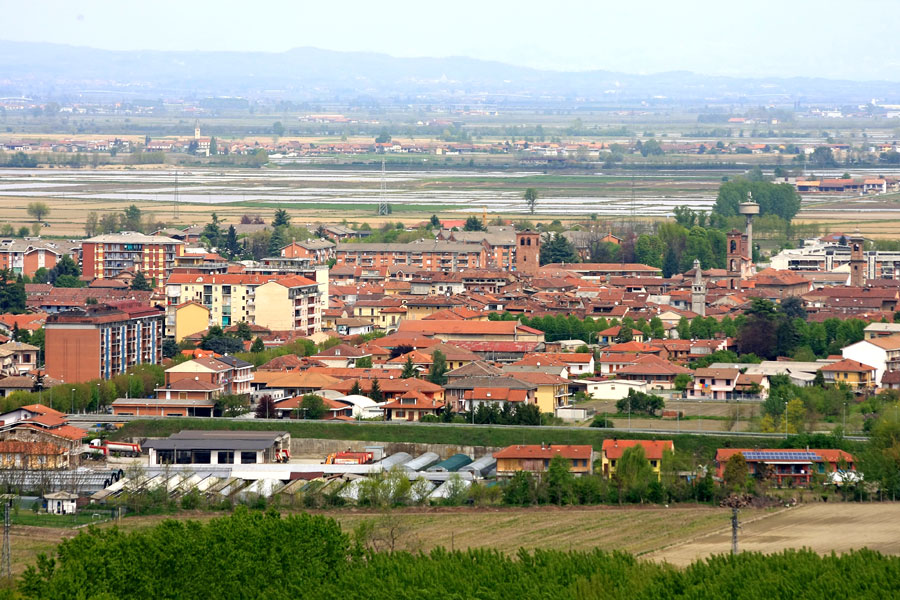
- View

- Coat of arms

- Location within Italy Location within Piedmont
- Coordinates: 45°11′N 8°6′E
- Country: Italy
- Region: Piedmont
- Province: Vercelli (VC)
- Frazioni: Campagna, Cerrone, Monte, San Grisante, San Silvestro, San Genuario, Caravini, Porzioni, Santa Maria, Mezzi Po, Galli, Cascinotti, Lignola

Government
  - Mayor: Vittorio Ferrero

Area
  - Total: 48.3 km^{2} (18.6 sq mi)
- Elevation: 154 m (505 ft)

Population (9 October 2011)
  - Total: 7,984
  - Density: 165/km^{2} (428/sq mi)
- Demonym: Crescentinesi
- Time zone: UTC+1 (CET)
  - Summer (DST): UTC+2 (CEST)
- Postal code: 13044
- Dialing code: 0161

Crescentino is a comune (municipality) in the Province of Vercelli in the Italian region Piedmont, located about 35 kilometres (22 mi) northeast of Turin and about 30 kilometres (19 mi) southwest of Vercelli.

Crescentino borders the following municipalities: Brusasco, Fontanetto Po, Lamporo, Livorno Ferraris, Moncestino, Saluggia, Verolengo, and Verrua Savoia.

Main sights include San Genuario Castle.

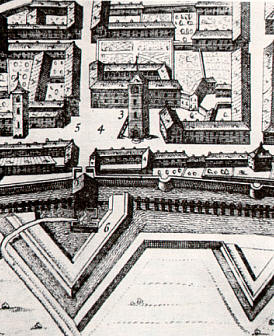
Piazza Vische and its tower (Theatrum Sabaudiae 1682)

== Twin towns ==
Crescentino is twinned with:

- San Giorgio Albanese, Italy
- Gmina Łososina Dolna, Poland

== People ==
- Luigi Arditi (1822–1903), violinist and composer
- Ettore Bertolè-Viale (1829-1992), elected deputy for the town 1867-1882
- Bartolomeo Caravoglia (active 1660–1673), painter of the Baroque period
- Fiorenza Cossotto (born 1935), operatic mezzo-soprano
- Domenico Serra, (1899–1965), stage and film actor
