= Camino, Piedmont =

Camino
- Comune
- Comune di Camino
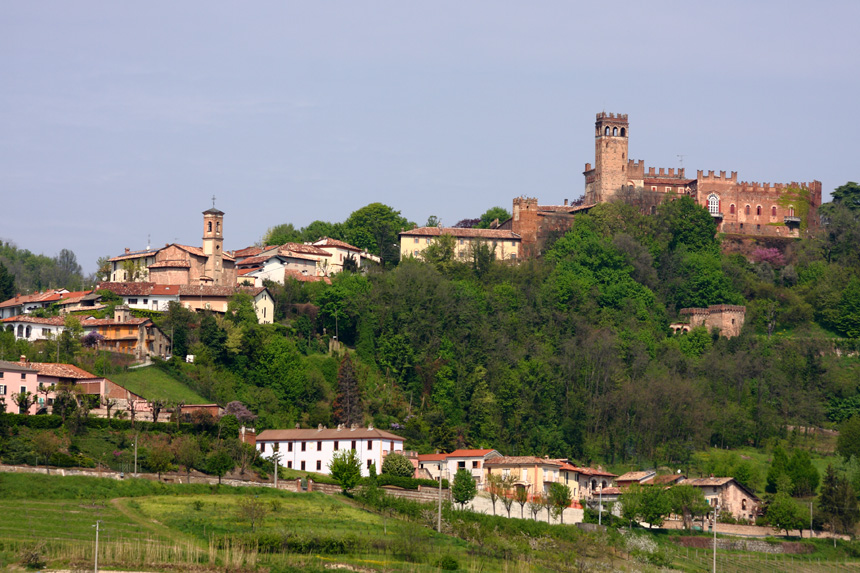

- Location within Italy Location within Piedmont
- Coordinates: 45°10′N 8°17′E
- Country: Italy
- Region: Piedmont
- Province: Province of Alessandria (AL)

Area
  - Total: 18.4 km^{2} (7.1 sq mi)

Population (Dec. 2004)
  - Total: 763
  - Density: 41.5/km^{2} (107/sq mi)
- Time zone: UTC+1 (CET)
  - Summer (DST): UTC+2 (CEST)
- Postal code: 15020
- Dialing code: 0142

Camino is a comune (municipality) in the Province of Alessandria in the Italian region Piedmont, located about 45 kilometres (28 mi) east of Turin and about 40 kilometres (25 mi) northwest of Alessandria. As of 31 December 2004, it had a population of 763 and an area of 18.4 square kilometres (7.1 mi^{2}).

Camino borders the following municipalities: Gabiano, Mombello Monferrato, Morano sul Po, Palazzolo Vercellese, Pontestura, Solonghello, and Trino.

== Demographic evolution ==
Historical population

Year	Pop.	±%
1861	2,457	—
1871	2,722	+10.8%
1881	2,886	+6.0%
1901	3,124	+8.2%
1911	2,977	−4.7%

Year	Pop.	±%
1921	2,892	−2.9%
1931	2,600	−10.1%
1936	2,466	−5.2%
1951	2,175	−11.8%
1961	1,568	−27.9%

Year	Pop.	±%
1971	1,201	−23.4%
1981	1,008	−16.1%
1991	845	−16.2%
2001	734	−13.1%

Source: Data from ISTAT

== Castello di Camino ==
The Castello di Camino dates from the 11th century and has one of the highest medieval towers in the Monferrato area. The castle belonged to the Bishop of Asti up until the 13th century and was later administered by the Marquis of Montferrat. From 1323 to 1950, the castle belonged to the Scarampi family from Villanova. Vittorio Emanuele II, Umberto I and Vittorio Emanuele III of Savoy were guests at the castle. Benito Mussolini inaugurated the Monferrato aqueduct from the castle balcony.

== Gallery ==
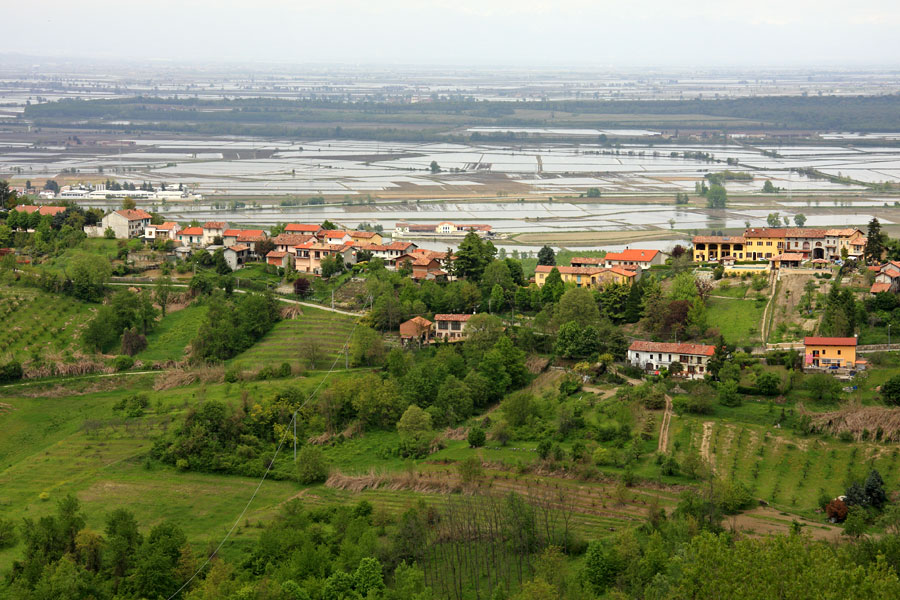
View over Rocca delle Donne

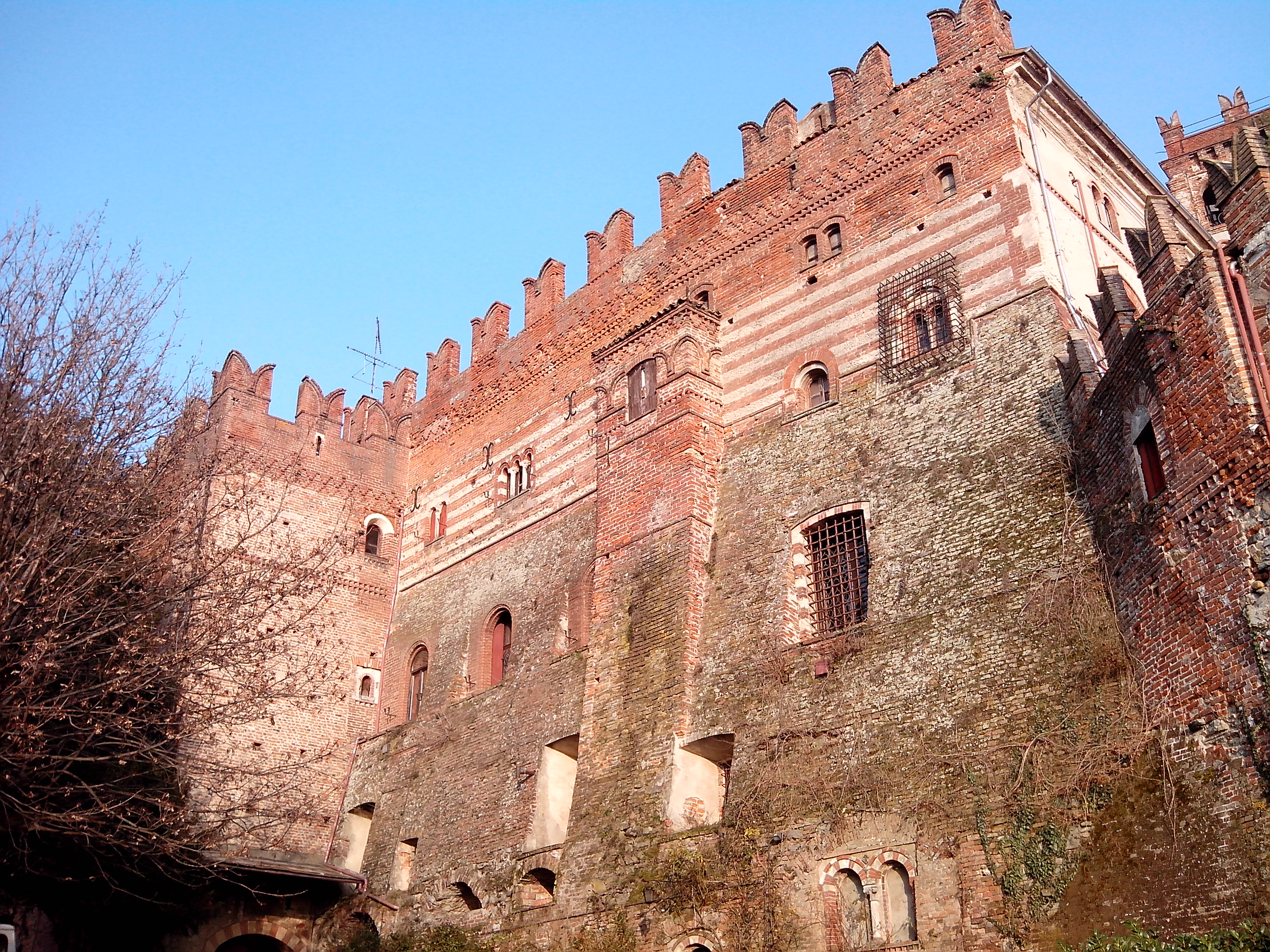
Castle of Camino

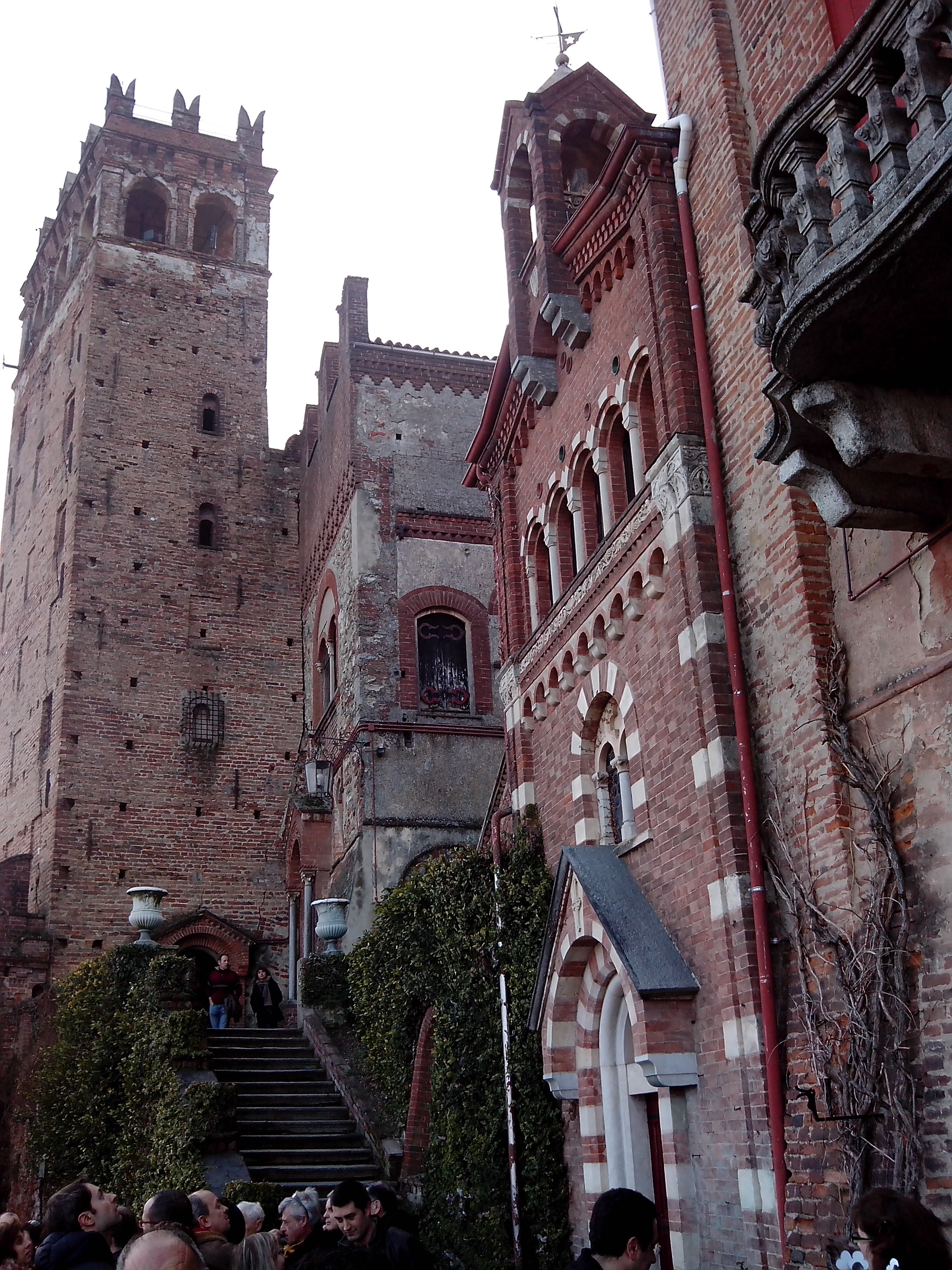
main tower of the castle

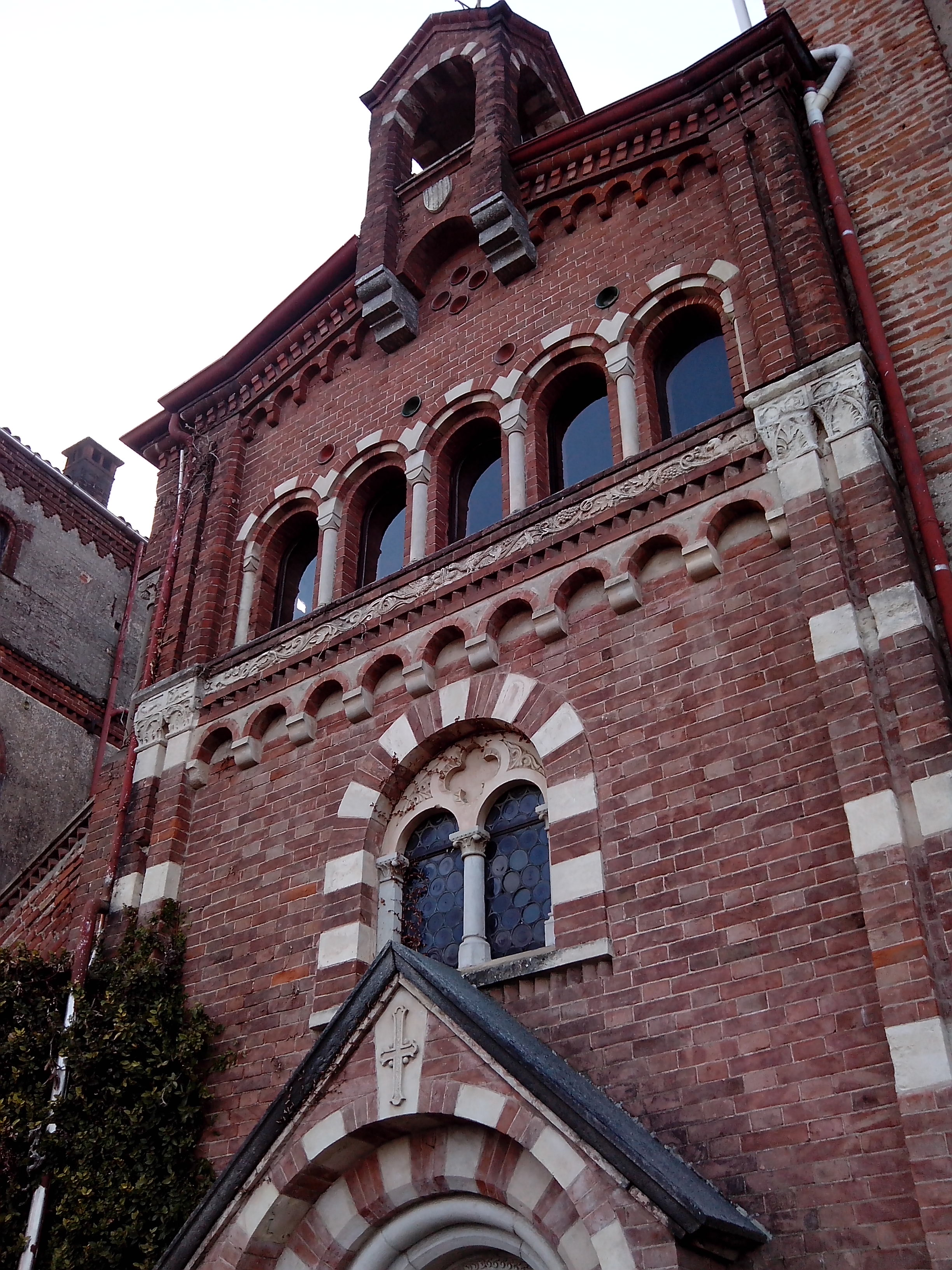
particular of the inner side of the castle

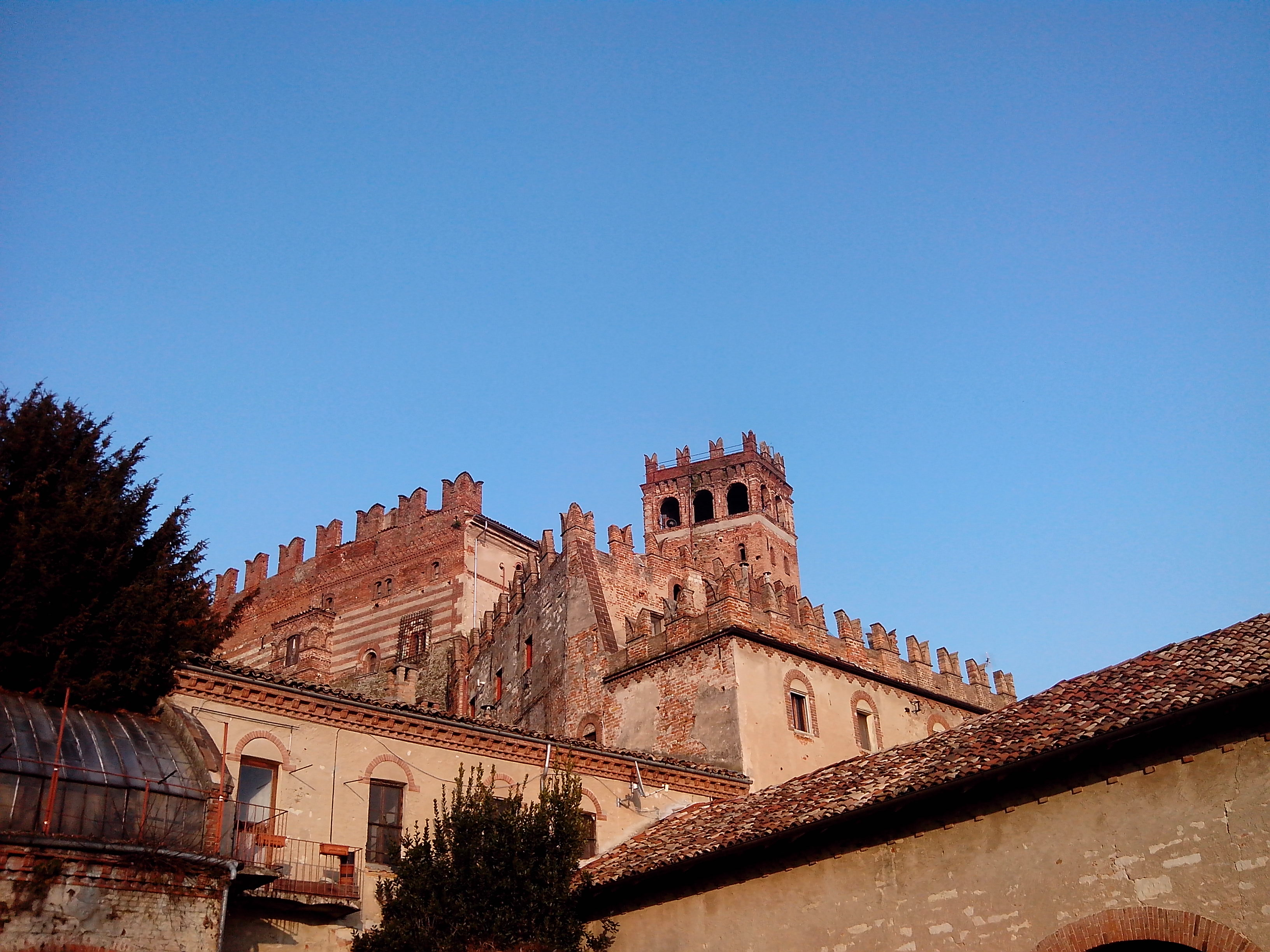
another view of the castle

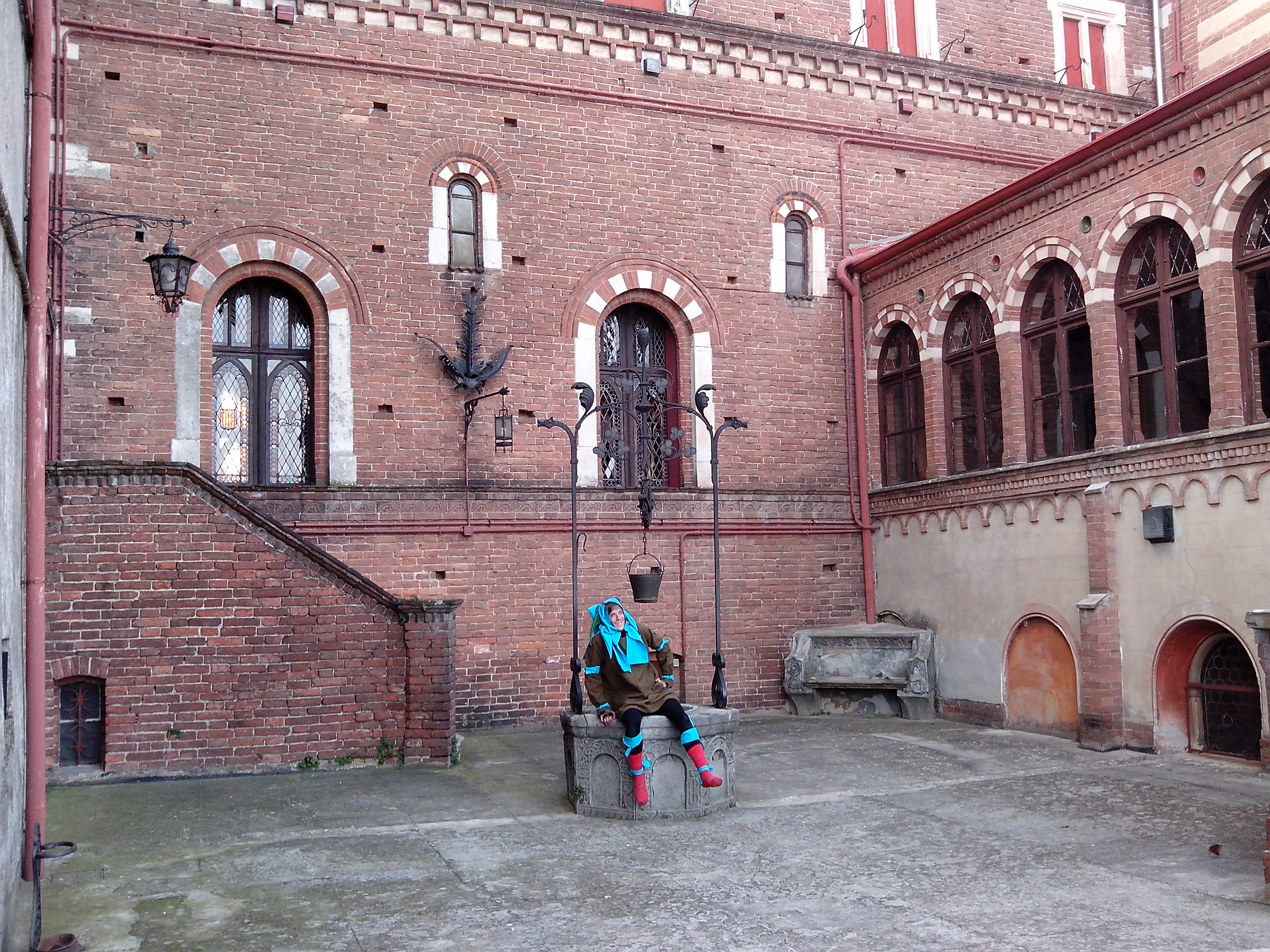
a jester in the castle courtyard

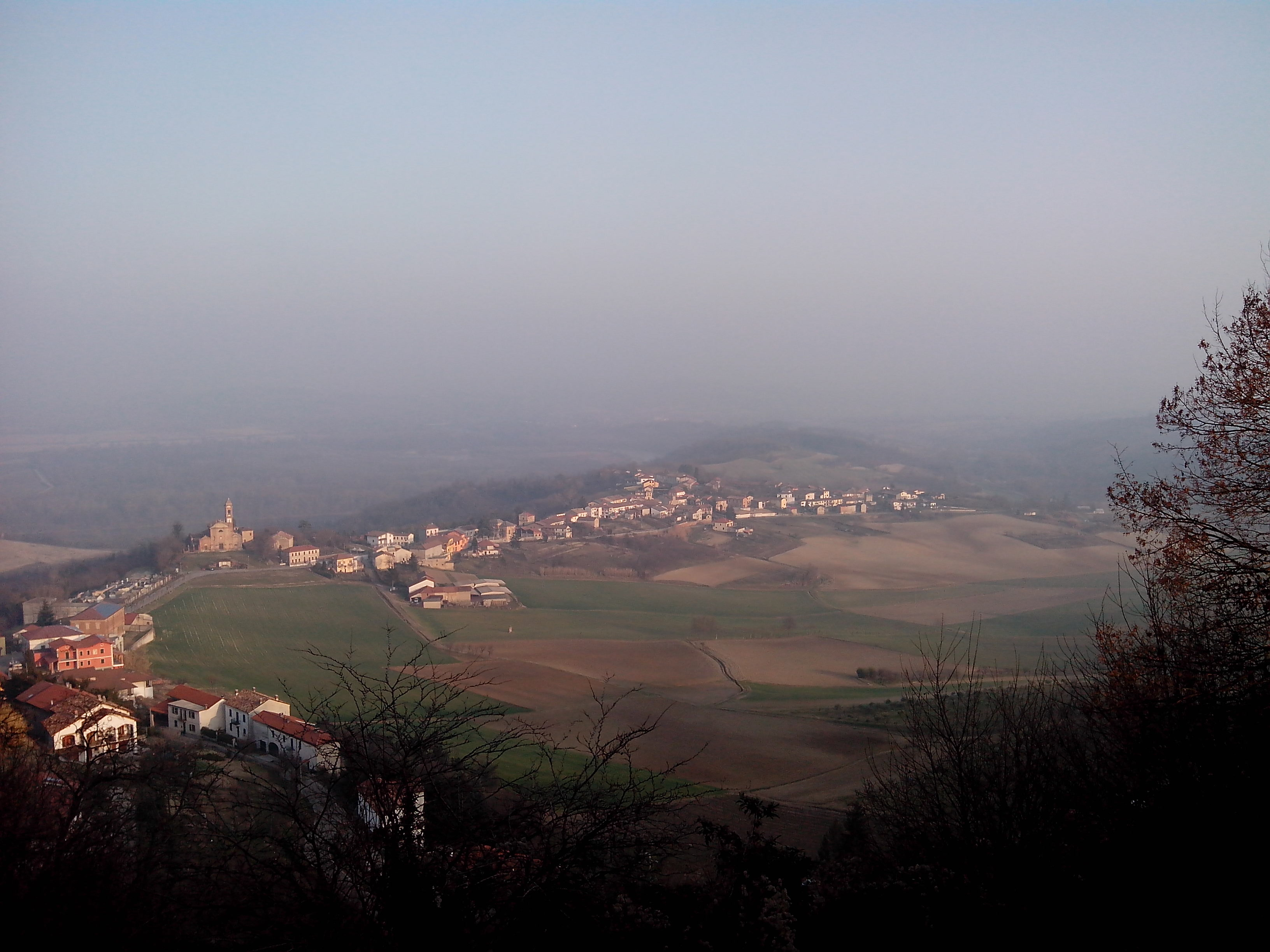
aerial view of Camino
