= San Genuario Castle =

Castle in Piedmont, Italy

- Castello di San Genuario
- Crescentino, Piedmont, Italy
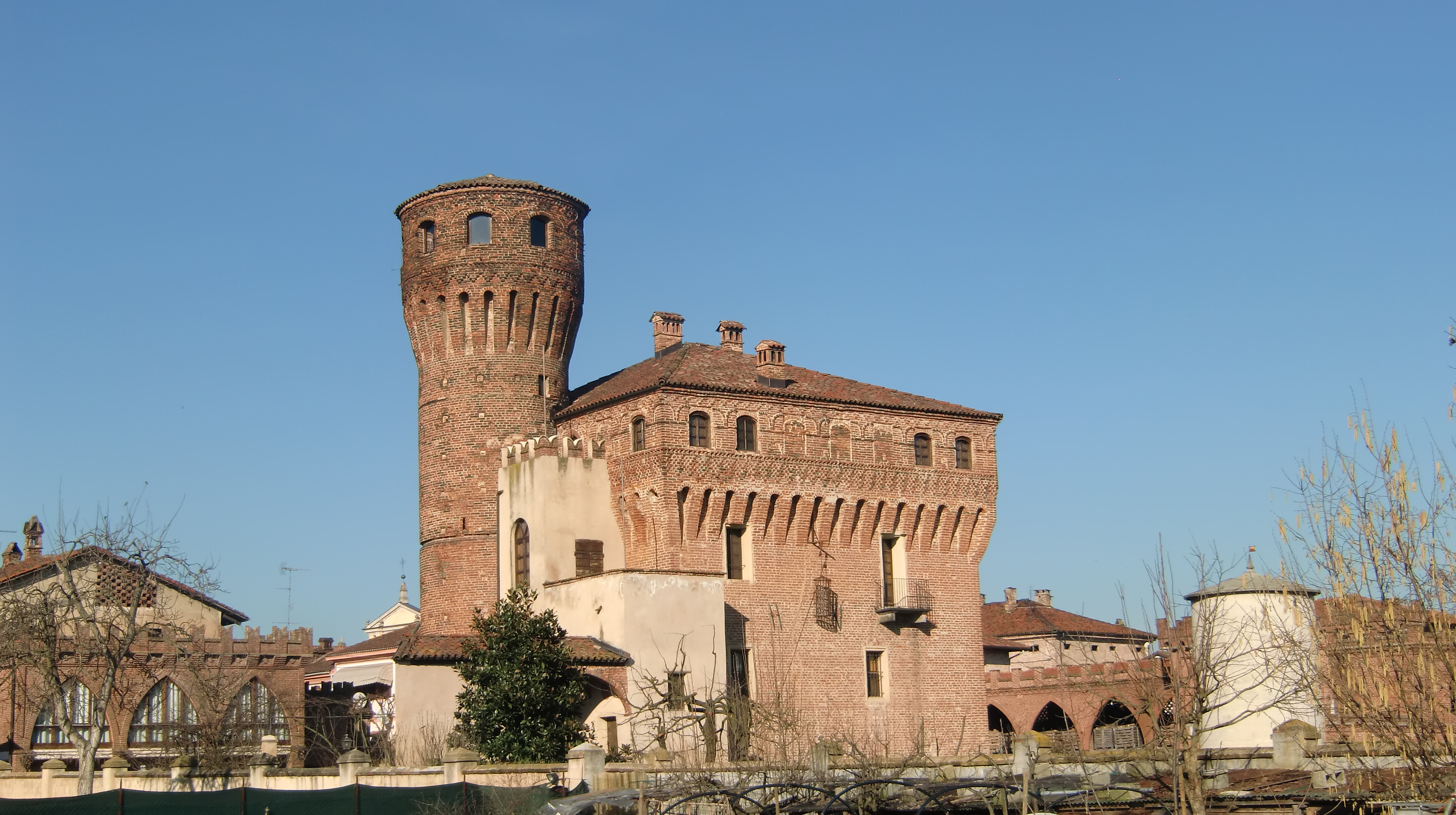
- San Genuario Castle in 2011

Site information
- Type: Castle

Location
- Coordinates: 45°12′49.21″N 8°08′40.88″E

San Genuario Castle (Italian: Castello di San Genuario) is a castle located in Crescentino, Piedmont, Italy.

== History ==
The castle stands in an area that was once strategically important due to its location on the border between the territories of the March of Montferrat and those of the Diocese of Vercelli. Its origins are linked to the Benedictine monastery founded in 707 by the Lombard general Gauderio, the first monastic settlement in the area. In 843, Emperor Lothair I donated the relics of Saint Genuarius to the local abbey, giving the village and monastery their current name. Following conflicts between Guelphs and Ghibellines, in 1419 Giacomo Tizzoni, lord of Crescentino, obtained papal authorization to build a castle to defend the monastery, likely on the site of a previous fortress destroyed in 1319.

The Tizzoni family maintained control of the castle until 1592, when Charles Emmanuel I, Duke of Savoy brought it back under his rule. The fief later passed to various noble families, including the Molino di San Marco, Bobba, and Morozzo Della Rocca. In the 19th century, the castle became the property of banker Giani and later of Cavalier Gonella. In the early 20th century, the Garella family transformed the complex into a farm, adding new structures to the courtyard. The interiors were modified during World War II to accommodate displaced people.
