= Gabiano =

- Comune
- Comune di Gabiano
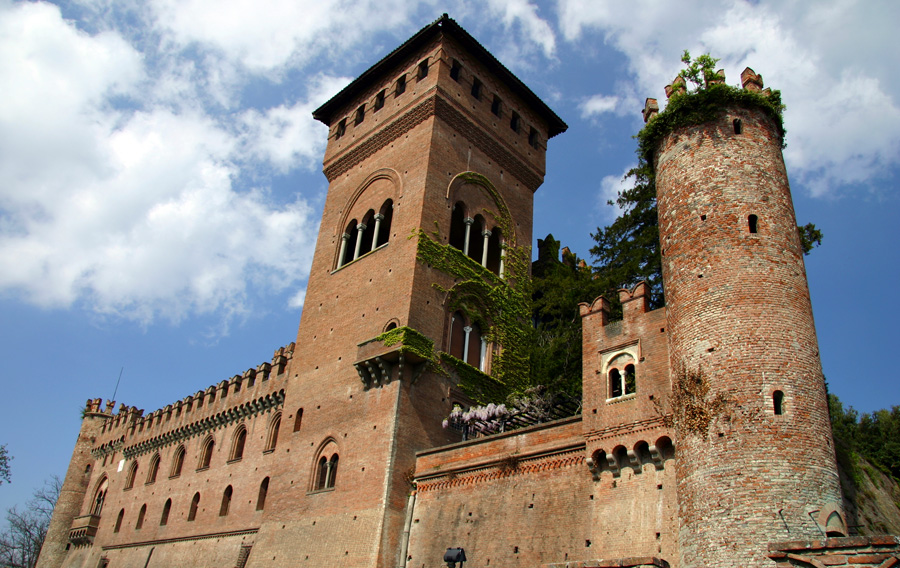
- The castle of Gabiano

- Coat of arms

- Location within Italy Location within Piedmont
- Coordinates: 45°9′N 08°12′E
- Country: Italy
- Region: Piedmont
- Province: Alessandria (AL)
- Frazioni: Cantavenna, Sessana, Varengo, Zoalengo, Mincengo.

Government
  - Mayor: Domenico Priora

Area
  - Total: 17.81 km^{2} (6.88 sq mi)
- Elevation: 300 m (980 ft)

Population (31 December 2010)
  - Total: 1,250
  - Density: 70.2/km^{2} (182/sq mi)
- Demonym: Gabianesi
- Time zone: UTC+1 (CET)
  - Summer (DST): UTC+2 (CEST)
- Postal code: 15020
- Dialing code: 0142
- Patron saint: Saint Peter
- Saint day: 7 April

Gabiano (Gabian in Piedmontese) is a rural comune in the northwest of the province of Alessandria, some 25 kilometres (16 mi) west of Casale Monferrato. This area straddles the lowland immediately south of the Po and the furthest extension of the Monferrato hills. Its current population of some 1,250 has halved since mid-1930s.

In addition to the village of Gabiano itself, and to Varengo, which was a commune in its own right until 1928, the 2001 census listed Cantavenna, Piagera and Sessana as the municipality’s primary centres of population. The secondary centres identified were Casaletto, Chioalengo, Martinengo, Mincengo, Serra and Zoalengo. Further localities include Borgatello, Brusasca, Garimanno, Le Ghiaie and Montechiaro.

The village of Gabiano lies on the southern slopes of a hill dominated by the ancient Gabiano Castle, which was restored in the early twentieth century in the Neo-Gothic style. At the foot of the hill—the original site of the village—is a parish church dedicated to Saint Peter. Although rebuilt in 1690, it retains the twin bell towers from the original medieval building.

Cantavenna, largely rebuilt after the Second World War, has two works of interest by the sculptor Giannino Castiglioni: a bas relief celebrating the “Peasant Defender of Liberty” and the “Fountain of the Emigrants”, which was commissioned by the Italians of Chicago. In the nineteenth century the parish church of San Carpoforo was erected here on the spot where the Jacobins had planted their tree of liberty.

== Wine ==
Two DOC wines with very limited zones of production are produced in the commune. Gabiano is made here and in the neighbouring commune of Moncestino, using the Barbera grape together with 5%–10% of Freisa and/or Grignolino. Rubino di Cantavenna is made in Gabiano, Montecestino, Villamiroglio and part of Camino. Again the predominant grape is Barbera (75%–90%) with Freisa and/or Grignolino making up the remainder.

== References and further reading ==
- Gabiano at www.piemondo.it (in Italian)
- A history of Gabiano (in Italian) by the local historian Luigi Calvo from the site www.ilmonferrato.info.
- Gabiano DOC (in Italian) (map of zone of production) at the official site of the Piedmont Region.
- Rubino di Cantavenna DOC (in Italian) (map of zone of production) at the official site of the Piedmont Region.
