= Livorno Ferraris =

Municipality in Vercelli, Italy

- Comune
- Comune di Livorno Ferraris
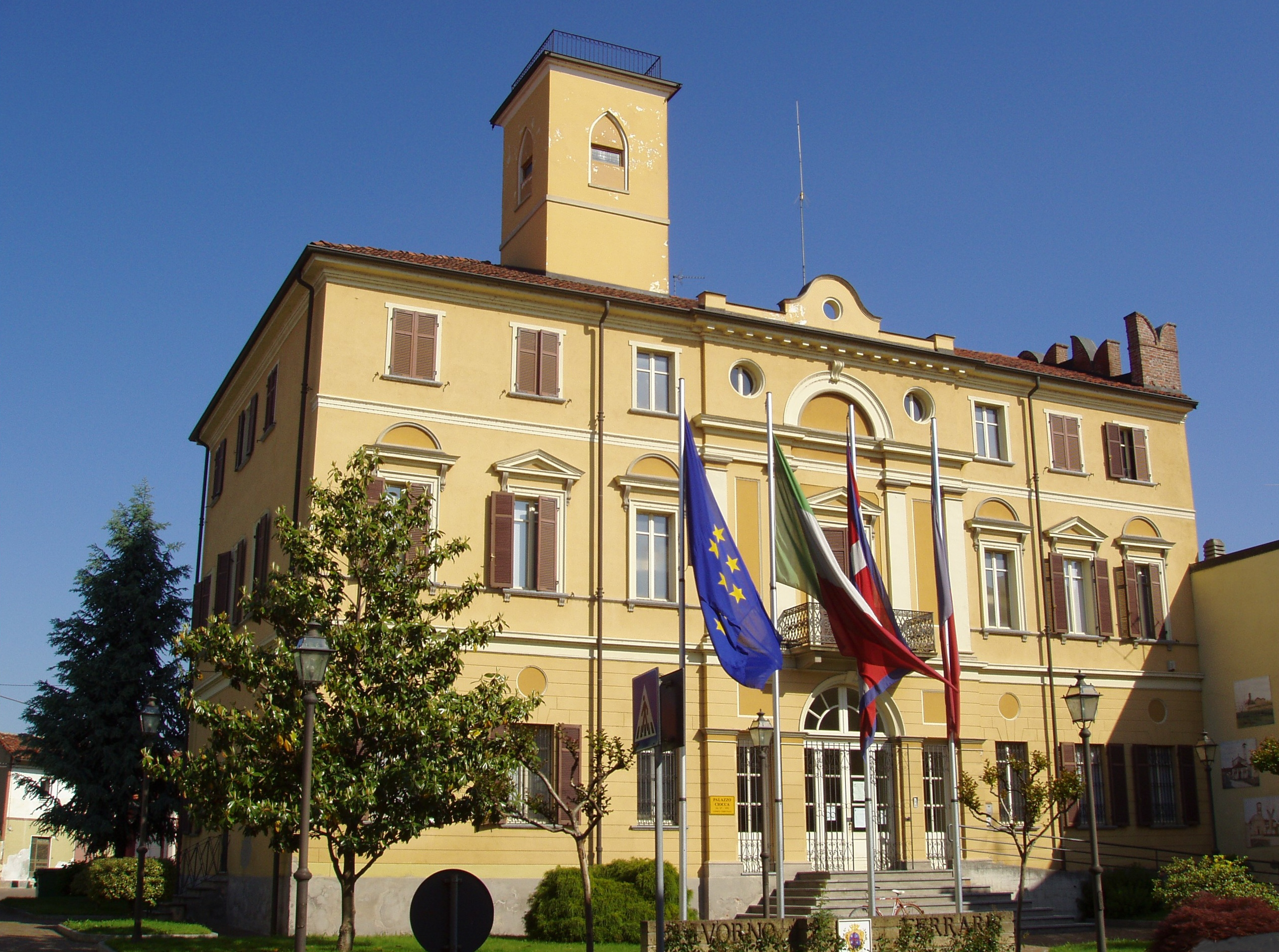
- Town Hall

- Coat of arms

- Location within Italy Location within Piedmont
- Coordinates: 45°17′N 8°5′E
- Country: Italy
- Region: Piedmont
- Province: Vercelli (VC)
- Frazioni: Castell'Apertole, Colombara, Garavoglie, Gerbidi, San Giacomo

Government
  - Mayor: Franco Sandra

Area
  - Total: 58.1 km^{2} (22.4 sq mi)
- Elevation: 188 m (617 ft)

Population (31 December 2010)
  - Total: 4,529
  - Density: 78.0/km^{2} (202/sq mi)
- Demonym: Livornesi
- Time zone: UTC+1 (CET)
  - Summer (DST): UTC+2 (CEST)
- Postal code: 13046
- Dialing code: 0161
- Patron saint: Lawrence of Rome
- Saint day: 10 August
- Website: Official website

Livorno Ferraris is a comune (municipality) in the Province of Vercelli in the Italian region of Piedmont, located about 40 kilometres (25 mi) northeast of Turin and about 25 kilometres (16 mi) west of Vercelli.

Originally known as Livorno Vercellese or Livorno Piemonte, later the town took its current name from physicist Galileo Ferraris, who was born here in 1847.

== Twin towns ==
- Pont-de-Chéruy, France, since 2001
