= Sessera =

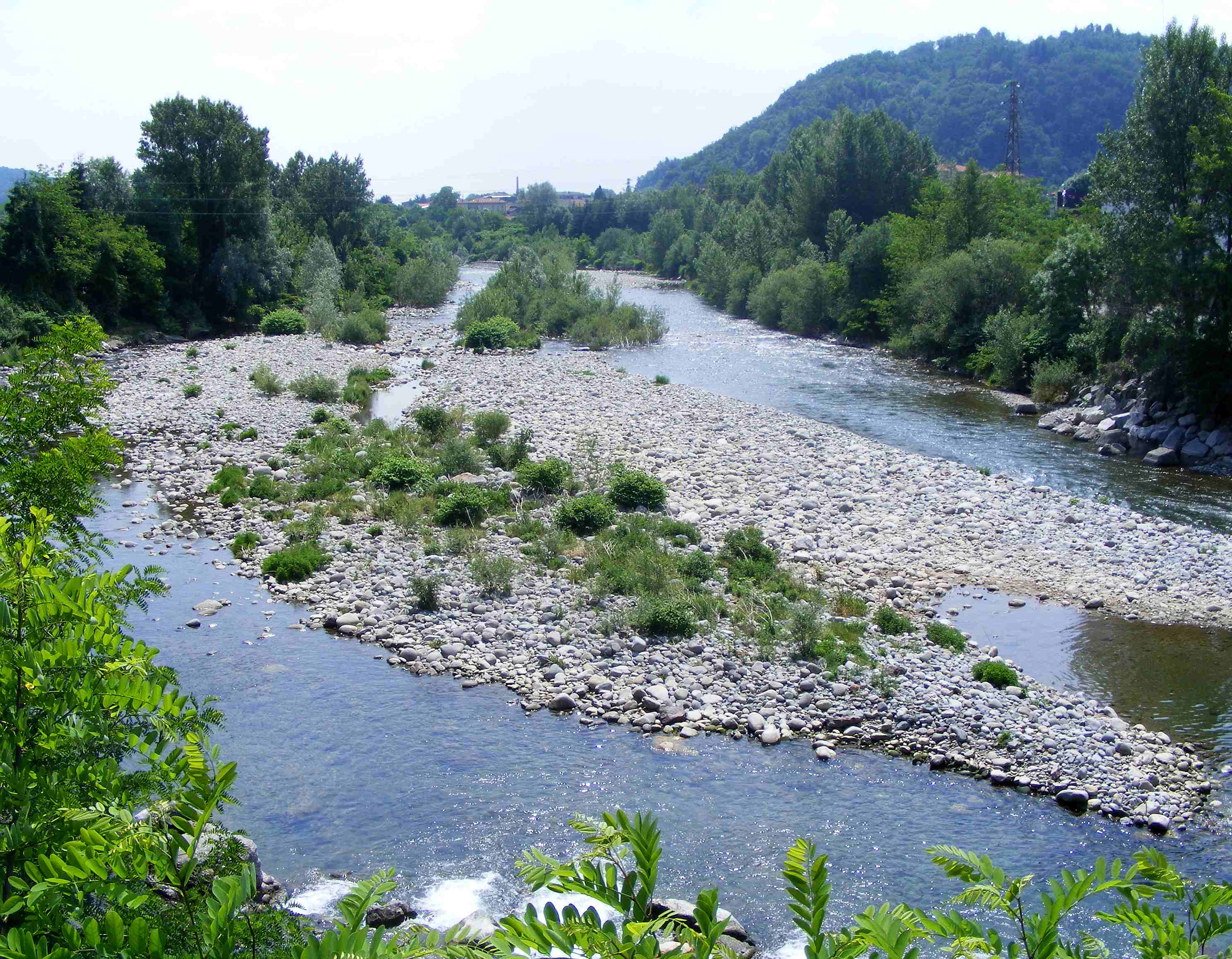
- The Sessera near Borgosesia

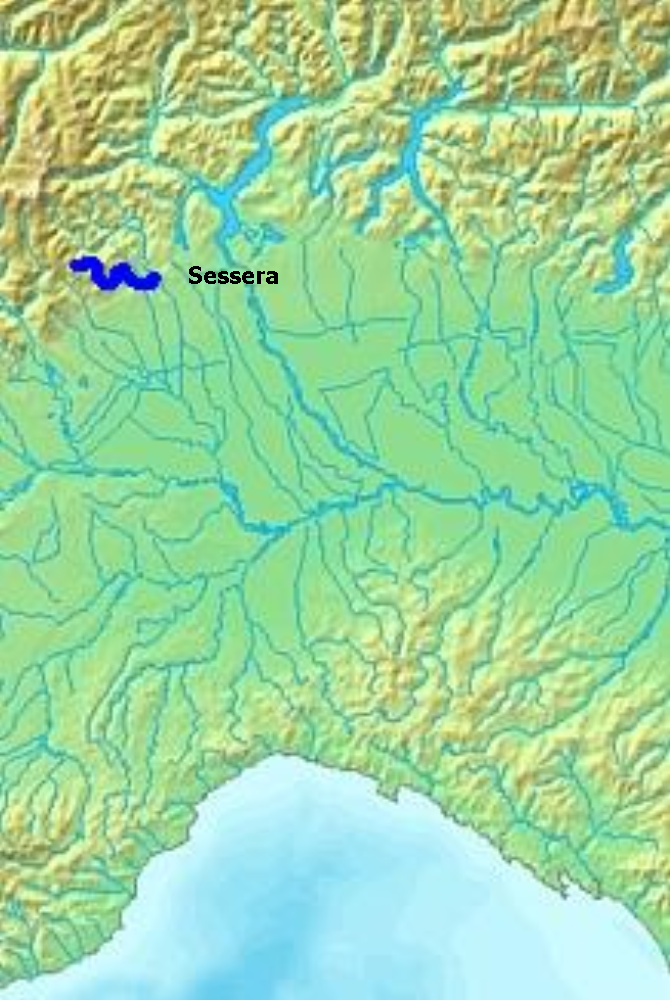
- Location within Po watershed

Location
- Country: Italy: province of Biella and province of Vercelli

Physical characteristics
- Source
  - location: Monte Bo eastern slopes (Punta del Manzo)
  - elevation: around 2,000 m (6,600 ft)
- Mouth
  - location: Sesia
  - coordinates: 45°41′56″N 8°17′52″E
  - elevation: 323 m (1,060 ft)
- Length: 35.461 km (22.034 mi)
- Basin size: 189 km^{2} (73 sq mi)
- Discharge
  - average: (mouth) 7.5 m^{3}/s (260 cu ft/s)

Basin features
- Progression: Sesia→ Po→ Adriatic Sea
- Tributaries
  - left: torrente Dolca, riale del Cavallero, torrente Strona di Postua
  - right: torrente Ponzone

The Sessera (Piedmontese: Séssera) is a 35.5 kilometres (22.1 mi) long torrent in the Piedmont region - NW Italy.

== Geography ==
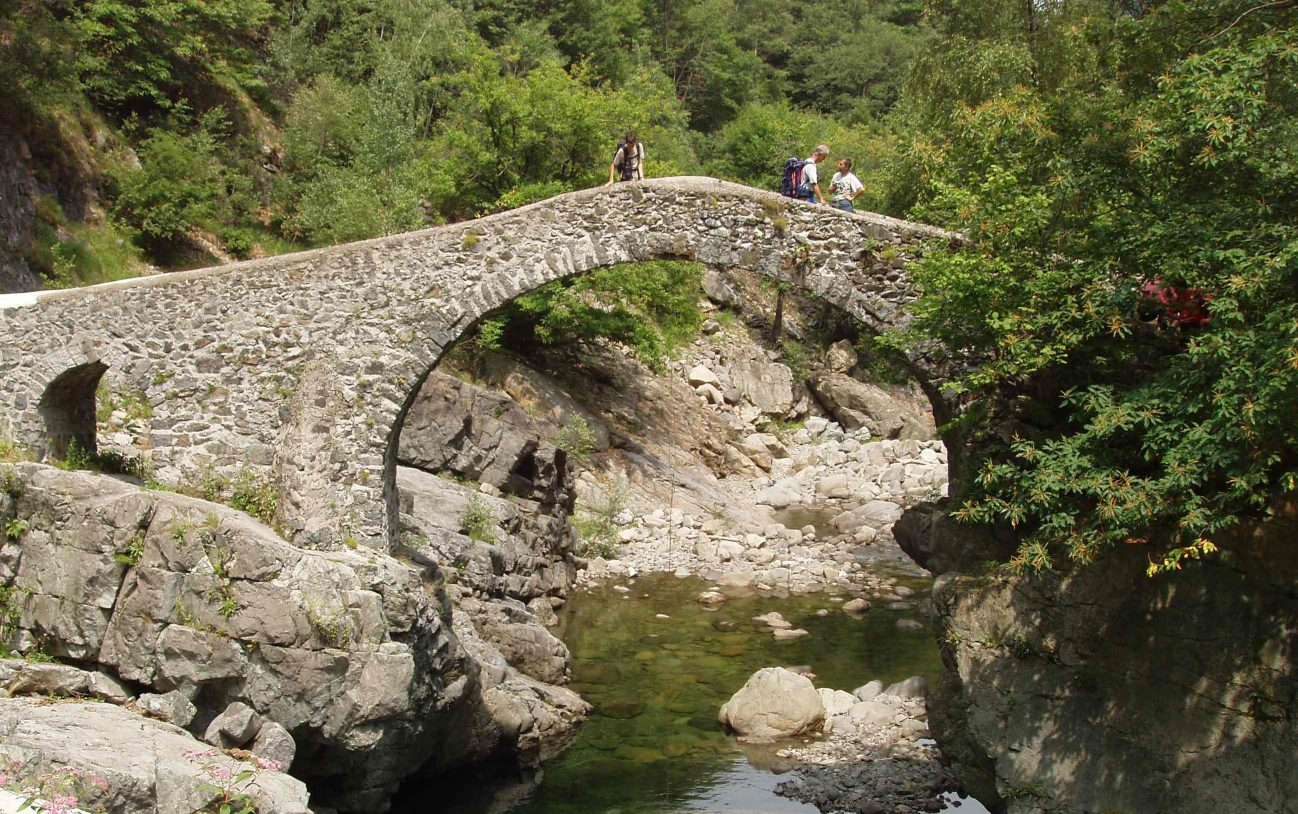
The ancient Babbiera stone bridge across the Sessera.

The Sessera starts in the Biellese Alps on the south-eastern slopes of Monte Bo. It initially flows from NW to SE and then encircles the Cima dell'Asnas and forms the artificial lake of Mischie, where it meets its first important tributary, the torrente Dolca (Dolca creek).

With several meanders the Sessera reaches Coggiola and the inhabited part of its valley. After having received two other relevant tributaries, the Ponzone in Pray from right and the Strona di Postua in Crevacuore from left, it enters into the Valsesia and flows into the river Sesia near Borgosesia.

== Floods ==
The river caused severe destruction in 1968 along the Sessera Valley.

== See also ==
- Valle Sessera
- Alpi Biellesi
- Hydrography of the Biella region

== Other projects ==
Media related to Sessera at Wikimedia Commons
