= Monte Tovo (Pennine Alps) =

Mountain in Italy

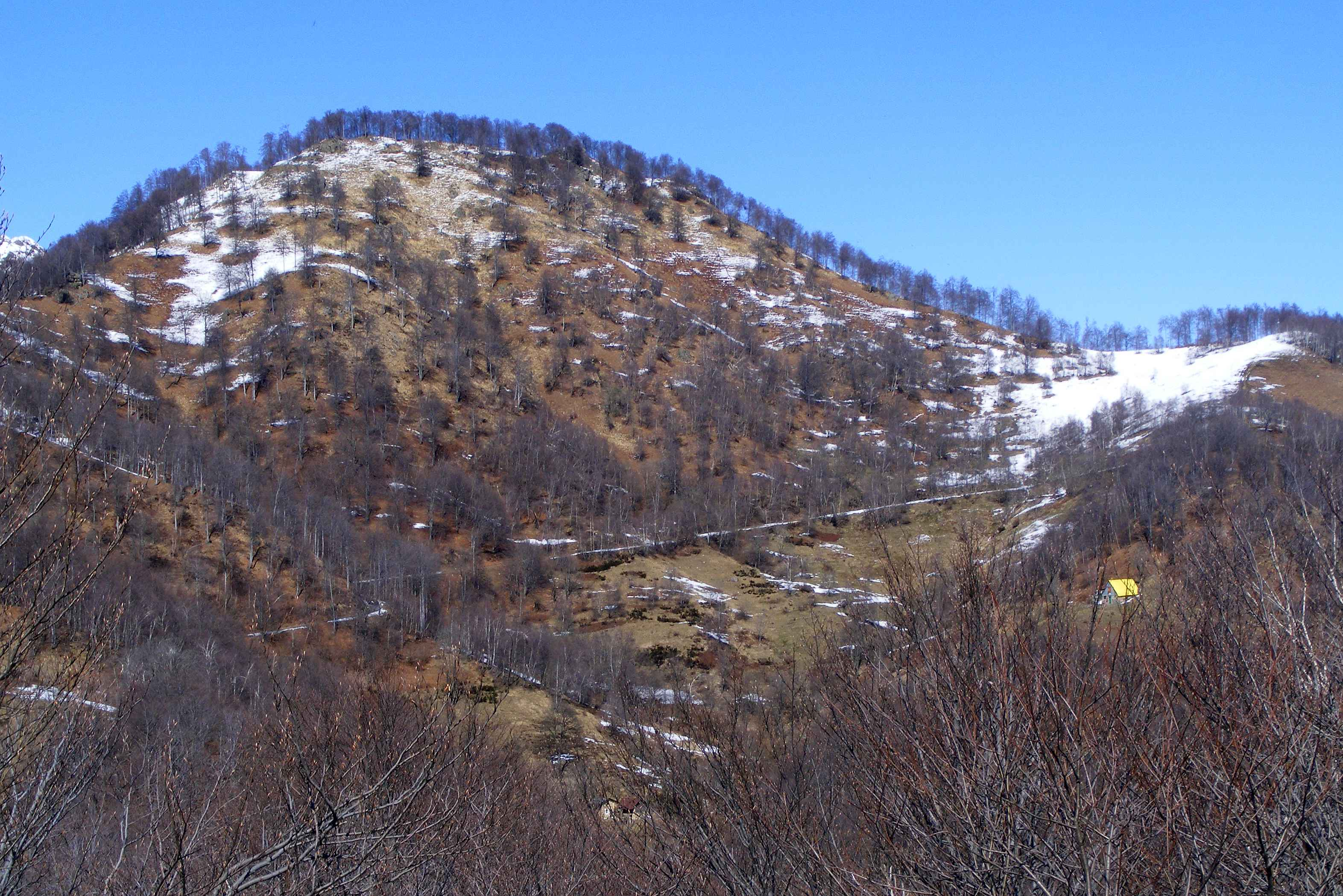
- Monte Tovo seen from Cime di Tortignaiga

Highest point
- Elevation: 1,386 m (4,547 ft)
- Prominence: 139 m (456 ft)

Geography
- Location: Piedmont, Italy
- Parent range: Pennine Alps

Monte Tovo is a mountain of Piedmont, Italy, with an elevation of 1,386 metres (4,547 ft). It is located in the Pennine Alps, in the Province of Vercelli.

== Details ==
It lies in Valsesia, which it divides from the valley of the Strona di Postua, on the border between the territory of the municipalities of Quarona and Borgosesia.

A mountain hut, Rifugio Luciano Gilodi "Ca’ Meja", is located near the peak, which can be reached on hiking paths from Costa di Foresto (Borgosesia) or Roncole (Postua). A summit cross and a geodetic point of the Istituto Geografico Militare are located on the peak.
