= Lanfranco Mignoti =

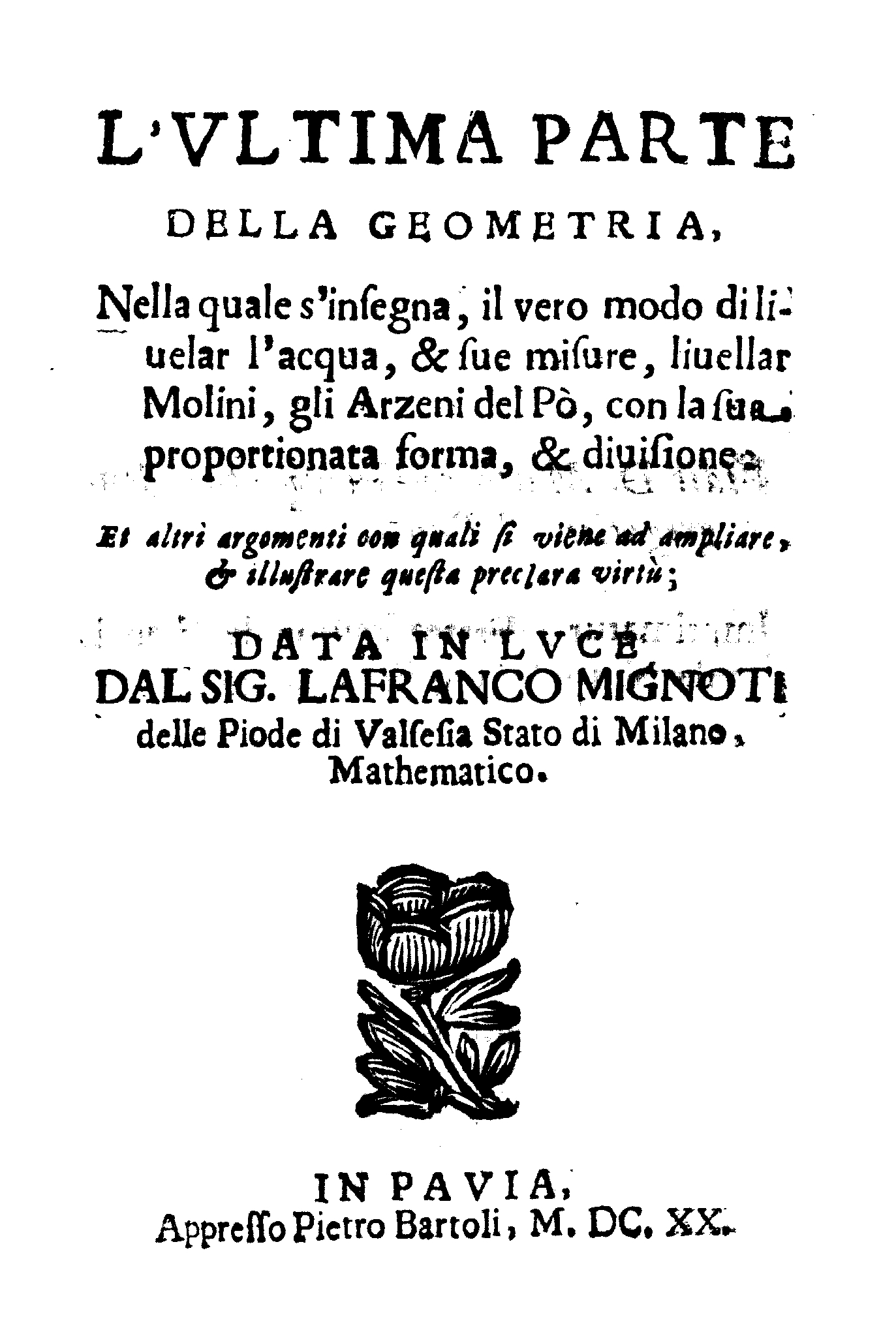
Ultima parte della geometria, 1620

Lanfranco Mignoti (Piode, 16th century – 17th century) was an Italian mathematician.

Born in Piode in Valsesia, he made a relevant contribution to hydraulic engineering.

== Works ==
- Mignoti, Lanfranco (1620). Ultima parte della geometria, nella quale s'insegna il vero modo di livellar l'acqua et sue misure, livellar molini, gli arzeni del Pò, con la sua proporzionata forma, et divisione (in Italian). Pavia: Pietro Bartoli. OCLC 947996080.
