= Strona di Postua =

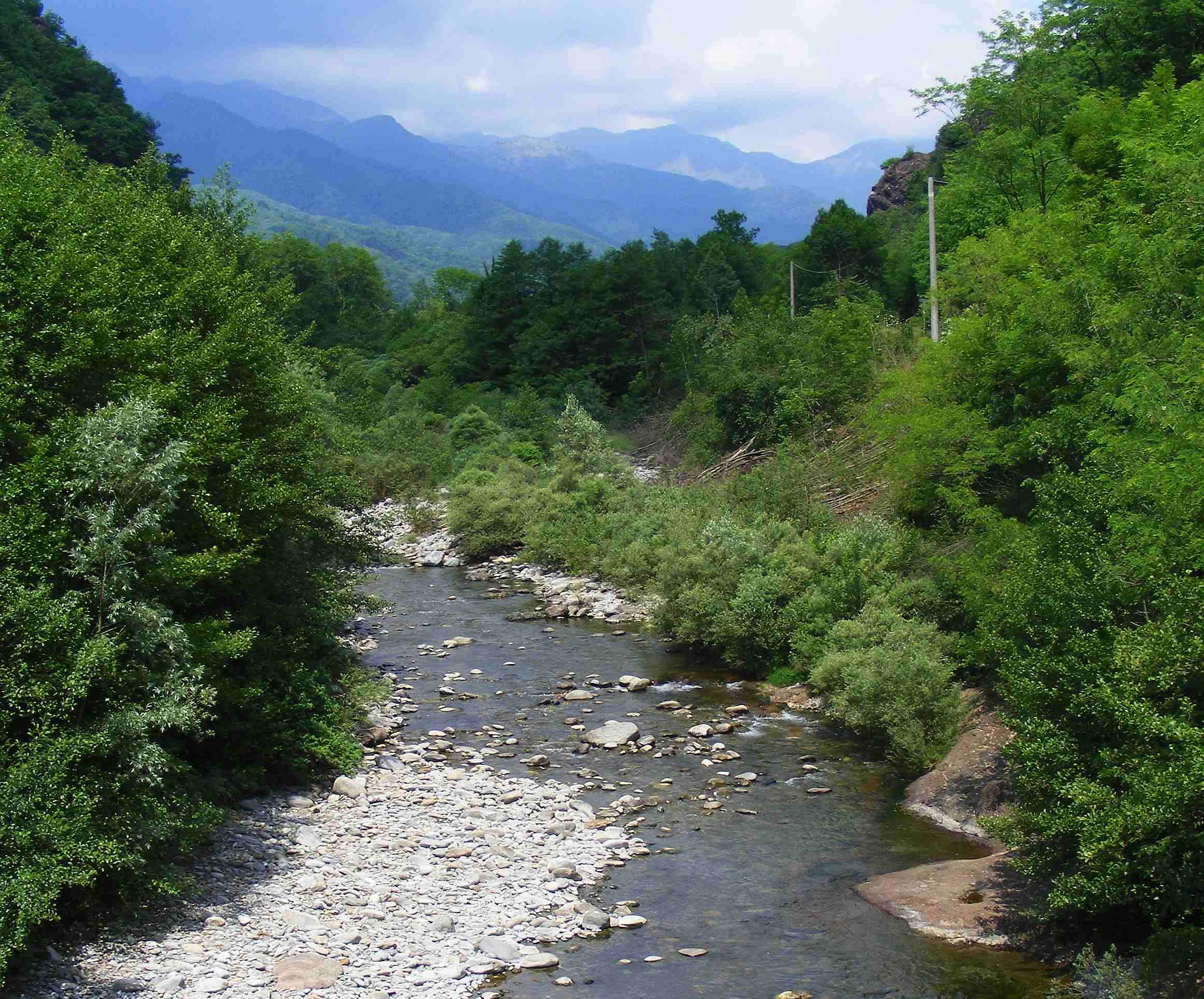
- The Strona between Guardabosone and Crevacuore

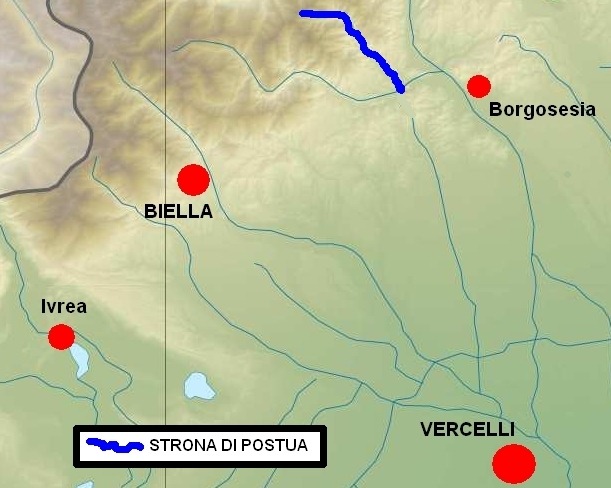
- Location within Biella and Vercelli provinces

Location
- Country: Italy: province of Biella and province of Vercelli

Physical characteristics
- Source
  - location: Monte Talamone
  - elevation: around 1,800 m (5,900 ft)
- Mouth
  - location: Sessera
  - coordinates: 45°41′17″N 8°15′33″E
  - elevation: 374 m (1,227 ft)
- Length: 14.1 km (8.8 mi)
- Basin size: 37.8 km^{2} (14.6 sq mi)
- Discharge
  - average: (mouth) 1.67 m^{3}/s (59 cu ft/s)

Basin features
- Progression: Sessera→ Sesia→ Po→ Adriatic Sea
- Tributaries
  - left: rio Brugarola
  - right: rio Cicognana, rio Canale di Strona, rio Forcioula

The Strona di Postua (Piedmontese: Stron-a ëd Pòstua) is a 14.1 kilometres (8.8 mi) long torrent in the Piedmont region of northwestern Italy.

== Etymology ==
The name Strona comes from storn or strom, celtic roots for "flowing waters" or "river". Postua is a comune located in the valley formed by the Strona.

== Geography ==
The Strona di Postua starts in the Biellese Alps with two branches which meet at Alpe Aigra. It then flows from NW to SE reaching the village of Roncole and the inhabited part of its valley. After flanking Postua and Guardabosone it enters into the Valsessera and flows into the river Sessera near Crevacuore.

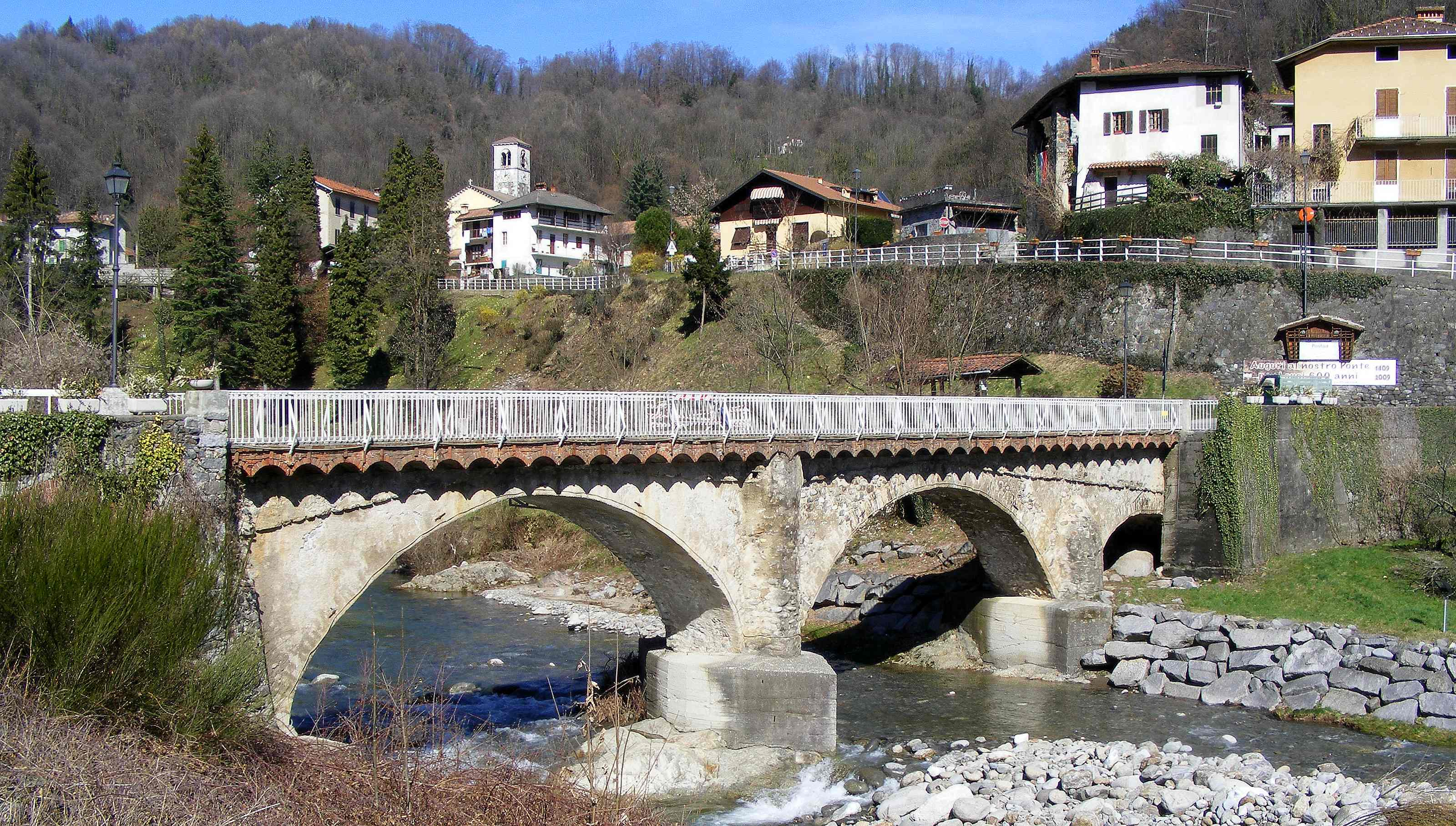
The old Postua stone bridge across the Strona.

== See also ==
- Alpi Biellesi

== Other projects ==
- Media related to Strona di Postua at Wikimedia Commons
