= Punta Lazoney =

Mountain in the Biellese Alps, Italy

- French: Pointe Lazoney; Walser: Lasòneyspetz or Lasòneyhòre
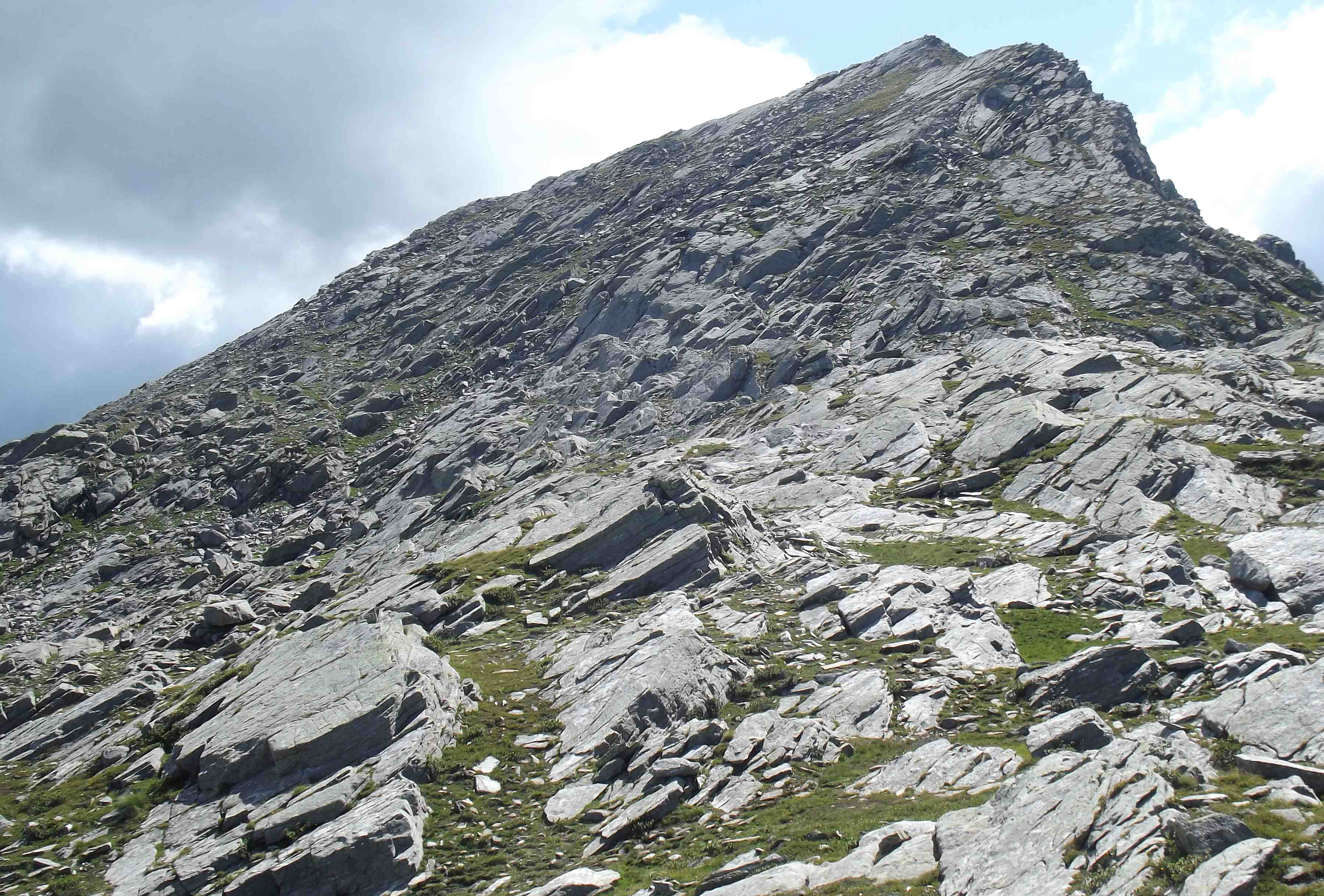
- The northwestern slope.

Highest point
- Prominence: 119 m (390 ft)
- Coordinates: 45°44′05″N 7°55′38″E

Geography
- Country: Italy
- Region(s): Piedmont; Aosta Valley
- Parent range: Alps

The Punta Lazoney (Note: Italian: Punta Loozoney; French: Pointe Lazouney; Walser: Lasòneyspetz or Lasòneyhore) is a peak in the Biellese Alps with an elevation of 2,579 m a.s.l. It lies between Valsesia, in the Province of Vercelli, and the Lys Valley, in Aosta Valley; at the summit, the municipal territories of the Piedmontese commune of Rassa and the Aosta Valley communes of Gressoney-Saint-Jean and Gaby converge.

== Toponym ==
In addition to Punta Lazoney, the mountain is also referred to in Italian publications as Punta Loozoney, using a different transcription of the name used by local inhabitants. The name in French is Pointe Lazouney, and in Walser it is Lasòneyspetz or Lazòneyhòre.

== Description ==
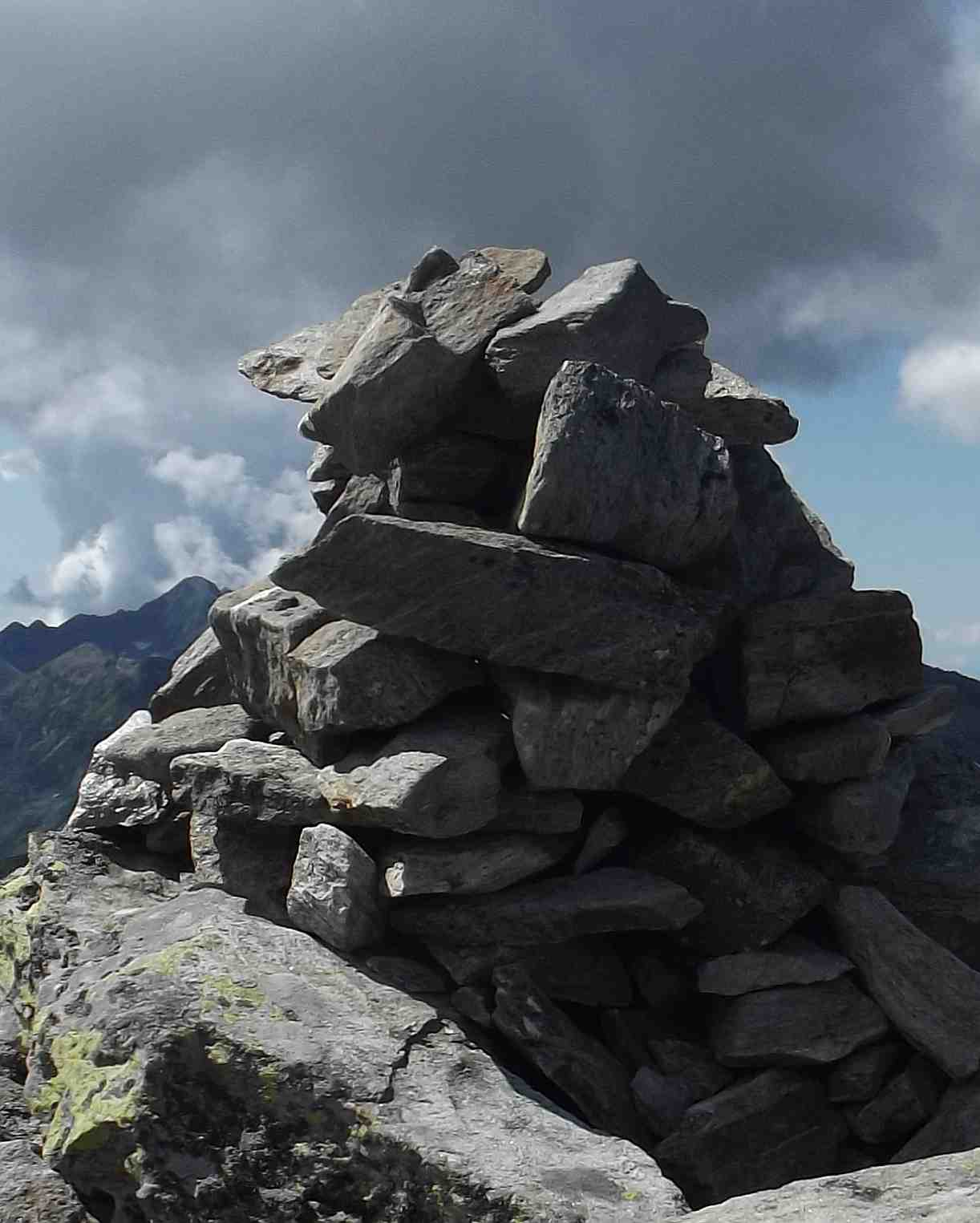
The summit cairn

Punta Lazoney lies at the convergence of three ridges: the northern ridge descends to the Loo Pass and connects it to the nearby Monte Cossarello, while the southeastern ridge, also part of the Lys / Sesia watershed, is rugged and uneven, reaching the Bocchetta di Niel (2,430 m) after a series of rocky outcrops before ascending to the Punta Tre Vescovi. The third ridge extends westward into the Lys Valley, descending to the Lazoney Pass (2,390 m) before rising again toward the Mont de Pianeritz area.

At the mountain's highest point stands a cairn of stones; the panorama is extensive, offering an excellent view of the Monte Rosa group.

The mountain's summit also corresponds to the geodetic trigonometric point of the IGM named Punta Lazoney (code 029071).

== Access to the summit ==
=== Summer access ===
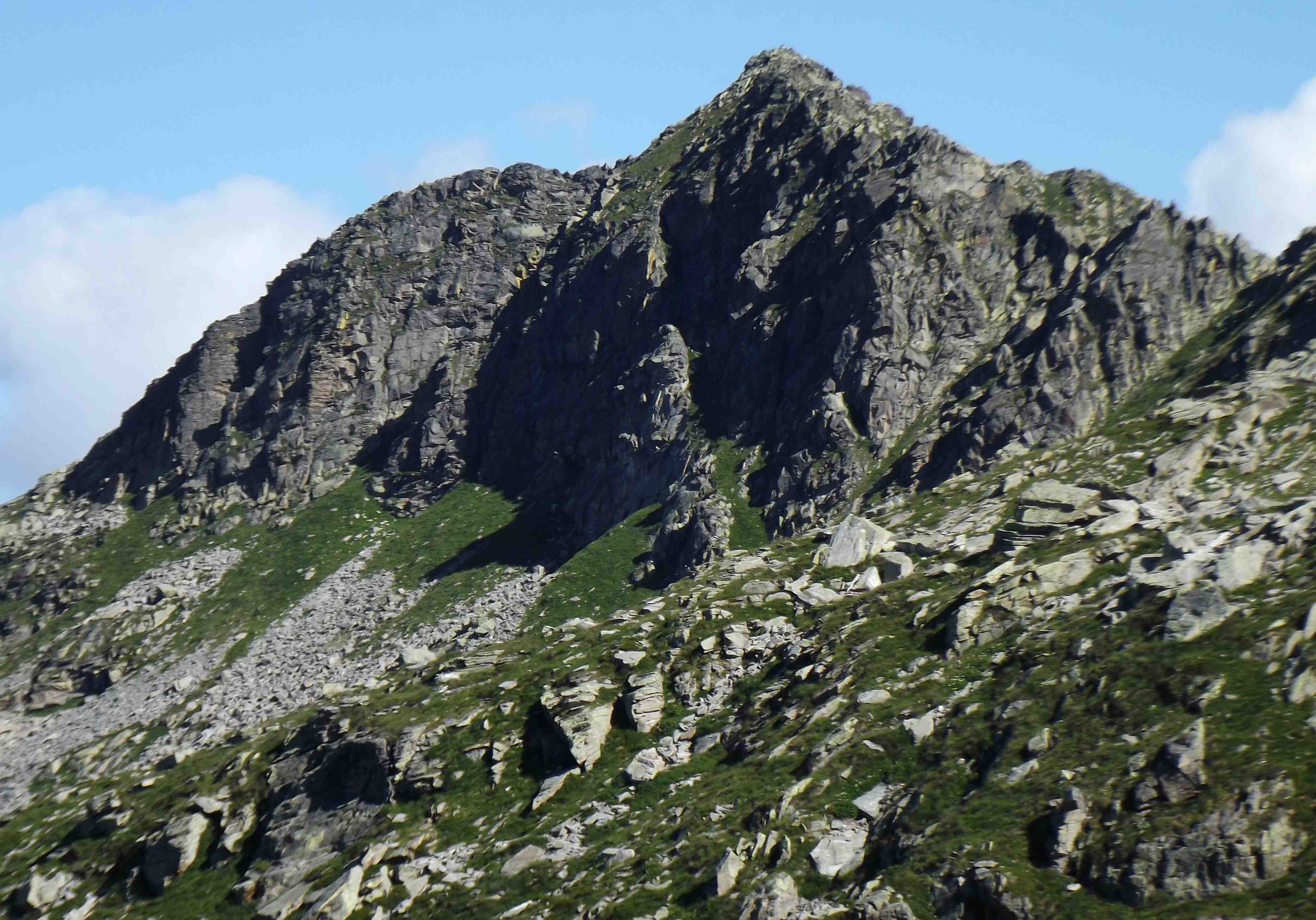
The mountain seen from Mologna Grande Pass.

Punta Lazoney is accessible via the ridge from both the Loo and the Lazoney Passes. In both cases, the Guida dei Monti d'Italia rates the ascent as difficulty E, while others consider it to be of type EE.

The ascent along the southeastern ridge from the Bocchetta di Niel is more challenging and includes several II-grade passages plus a IV-grade section known as del Dado, which can be bypassed on the Valsesia side.

=== Winter access ===
The mountain is also accessible with ski mountaineering skis and snowshoes. The ski ascent is rated as BS difficulty, while the snowshoe ascent is considered suitable for experienced snowshoers.

== Bibliography ==
- Regis, Giancarlo; Regis, Renza Piana (1981). Nuova guida alle Alpi biellesi [New Guide to the Biellese Alps] (in Italian). Biella: libreria V.Giovannacci.
- Castello, Alessandro; Protto, Elio; Zoia, Sandro (2013). Alpi biellesi e valsesiane [Biellese and Valsesian Alps] (in Italian). Milan: CAI / TCI.

=== Cartography ===
- Carta dei sentieri della Provincia di Biella 1:25,000 – Biellese nord-occidentale, Province of Biella, 2004
- Cartografia ufficiale italiana dell'Istituto Geografico Militare (IGM) at scales 1:25,000 and 1:100,000, available online
- Carta dei sentieri e dei rifugi scale 1:50,000 no. 9 Ivrea, Biella e Bassa Valle d'Aosta, Istituto Geografico Centrale – Turin
