= Scopello =

- Comune
- Comune di Scopello
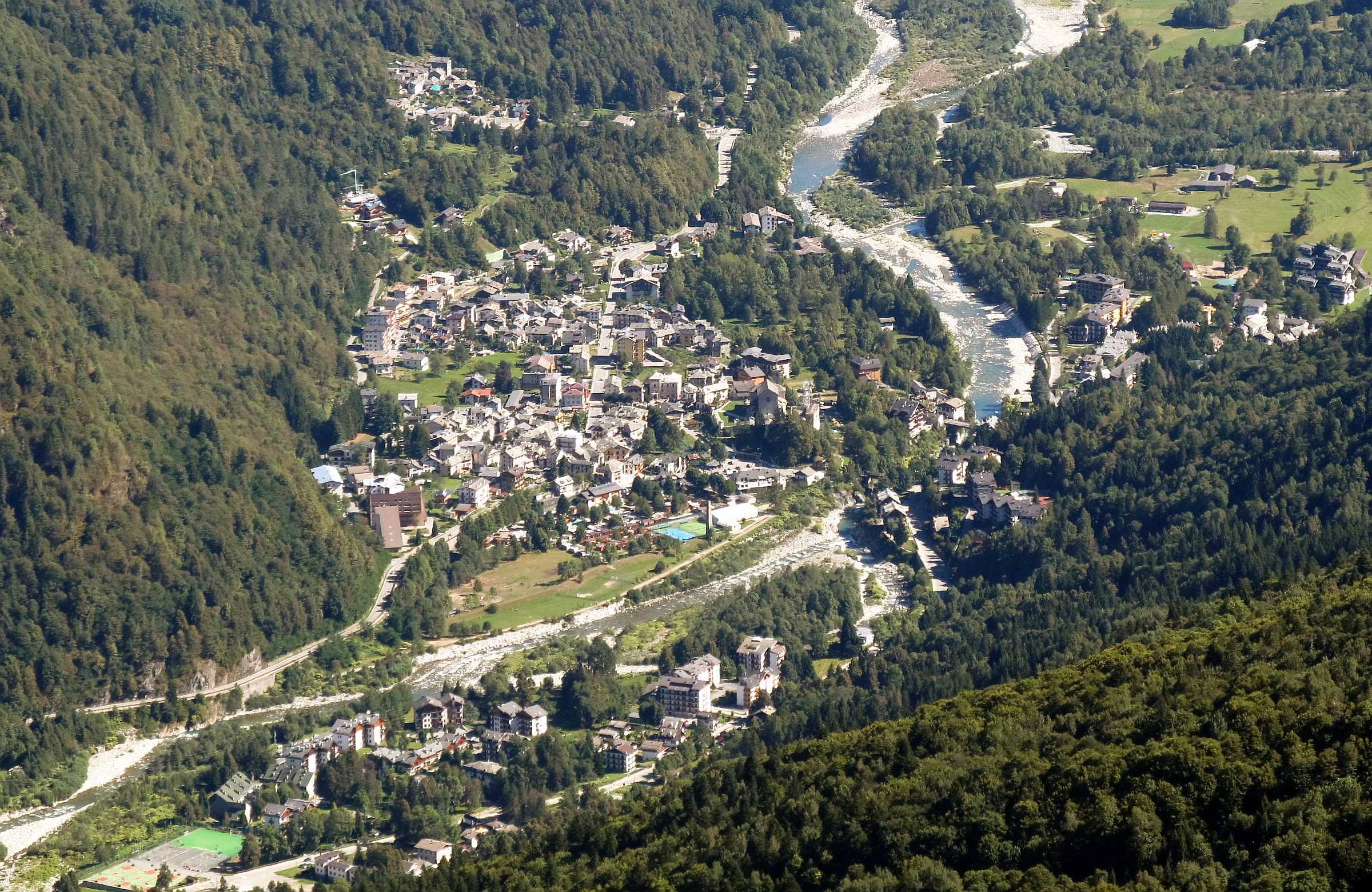
- Aerial view of Scopello

- Location within Italy Location within Piedmont
- Coordinates: 45°46′N 8°6′E
- Country: Italy
- Region: Piedmont
- Province: Vercelli (VC)
- Frazioni: Casa Pareti, Chioso, Frasso, Villabella

Government
  - Mayor: Antonella de Regis

Area
  - Total: 18.62 km^{2} (7.19 sq mi)
- Elevation: 659 m (2,162 ft)

Population (2018-01-01)
  - Total: 452
  - Density: 24.3/km^{2} (62.9/sq mi)
- Demonym: Scopellesi
- Time zone: UTC+1 (CET)
  - Summer (DST): UTC+2 (CEST)
- Postal code: 13028
- Dialing code: 0163
- Patron saint: Santa Maria Assunta
- Saint day: 15 August
- Website: Official website

Scopello is a comune (municipality) located in the Valsesia region of the Italian Pennine Alps, administratively in the Province of Vercelli, Piedmont. The municipality covers an area of 18.62 square kilometres (7.19 mi^{2}) and ranges in elevation from 640 to 1,930 metres (2,100 to 6,330 ft) above sea level. It takes its name from its main centre, the small town of Scopello, which stands on the river Sesia at an elevation of 659 metres (2,162 ft).

Other centres include Casa Pareti, Chioso, Frasso, Villabella, and Alpe di Mera. (Note: Casa Pareti, Chioso, Frasso and Villabella are formally identified as frazioni by the municipal statute.) The latter, as the name Alpe suggests, once provided summer pasture for livestock, and today is a winter ski resort.

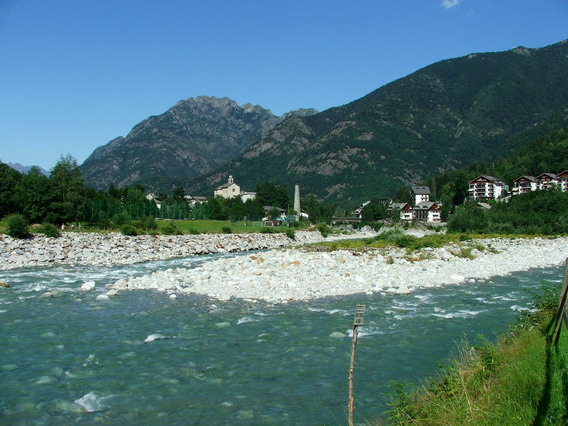
The river Sesia in Scopello

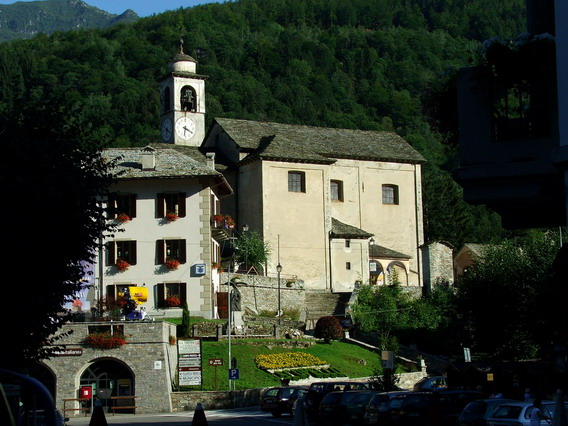
The parish church of the Beata Vergine Maria Assunta

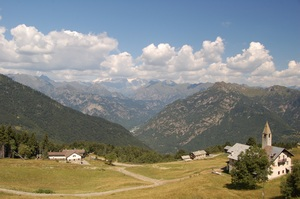
Alpe di Mera, in winter a ski resort

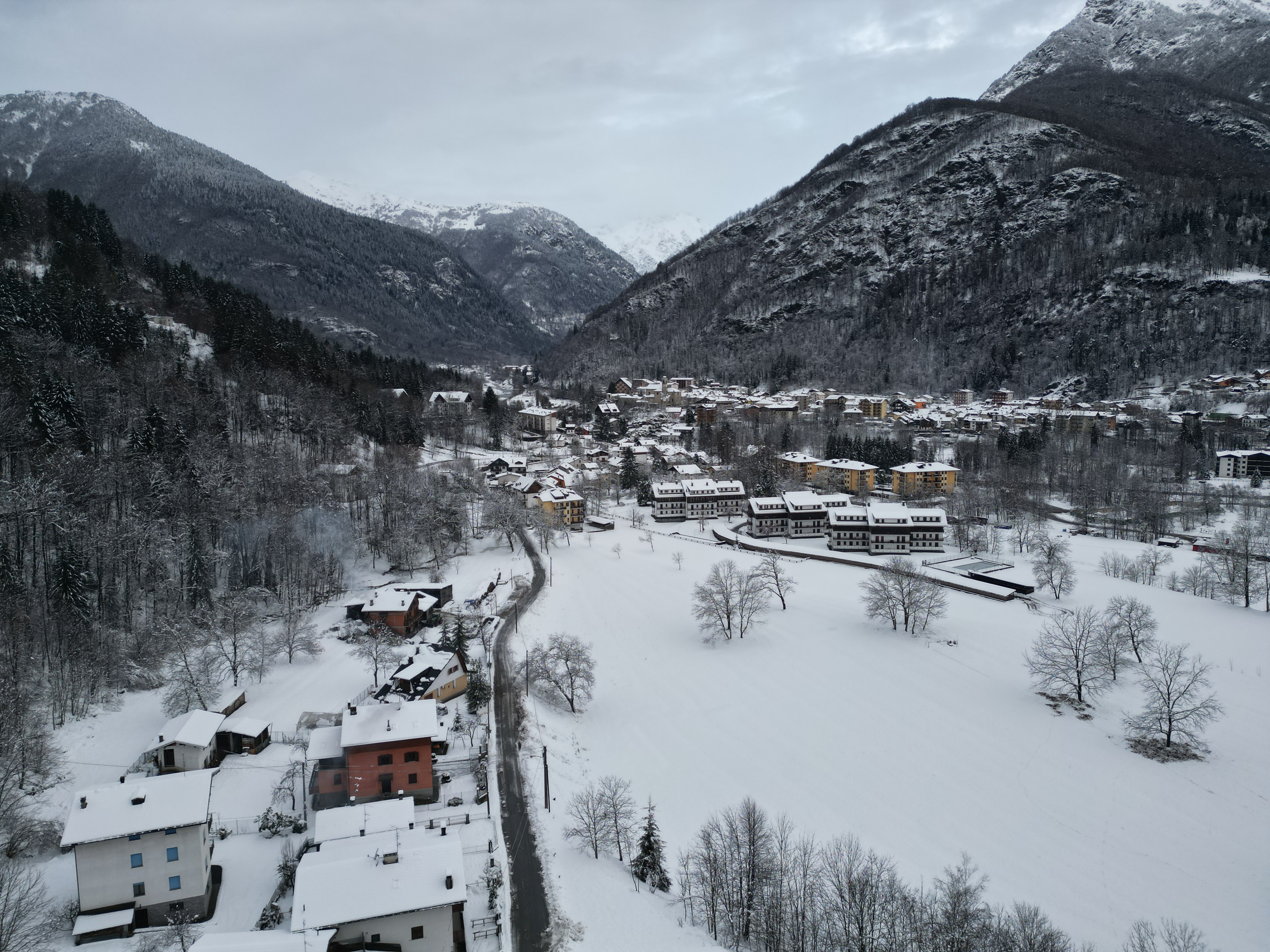
Scopello in winter 2024

Scopello borders Boccioleto, Campertogno, Caprile, Crevacuore, Guardabosone, Pettinengo, Pila, Piode, Scopa, Trivero, and Valle San Nicolao.

== Local government ==
Scopello belongs to the Comunità Montana Valsesia, a union of various municipalities in the Valsesia. The mayor is Antonella de Regis, since 2023.

== Population trends ==
Historical population

Year	Pop.	±%
1861	752	—
1871	738	−1.9%
1881	828	+12.2%
1901	715	−13.6%
1911	670	−6.3%

Year	Pop.	±%
1921	634	−5.4%
1931	502	−20.8%
1936	492	−2.0%
1951	490	−0.4%
1961	432	−11.8%

Year	Pop.	±%
1971	434	+0.5%
1981	418	−3.7%
1991	454	+8.6%
2001	442	−2.6%

Source: Data from ISTAT
