= Piovi =

Piovi is an Italian surname. Notable people with the surname include:

- Gonzalo Piovi (born 1994), Argentine footballer
- Lucas Piovi (born 1992), Argentine footballer

== See also ==
- Piòvi, the Piedmontese-language name for Piode, Northwest Italy
