= Balmuccia =

- Comune
- comune di Balmuccia
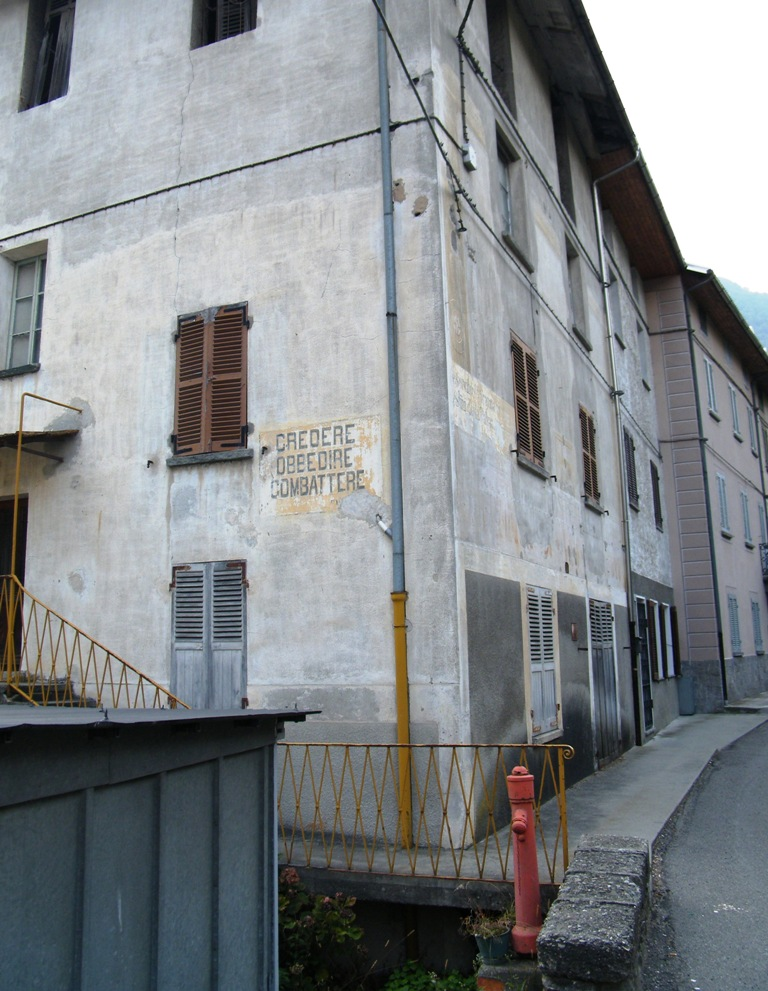

- Coat of arms

- Location within Italy Location within Piedmont
- Coordinates: 45°49′N 8°8′E
- Country: Italy
- Region: Piedmont
- Province: Vercelli (VC)

Government
  - Mayor: Moreno Uffredo

Area
  - Total: 11.85 km^{2} (4.58 sq mi)
- Elevation: 560 m (1,840 ft)

Population (28 February 2017)
  - Total: 116
  - Density: 9.79/km^{2} (25.4/sq mi)
- Demonym: Balmuccesi
- Time zone: UTC+1 (CET)
  - Summer (DST): UTC+2 (CEST)
- Postal code: 13020
- Dialing code: 0163
- Website: Official website

Balmuccia (Piedmontese: Balmucia) is a comune (municipality) in the Province of Vercelli in the Italian region Piedmont, located about 90 kilometres (56 mi) northeast of Turin and about 60 kilometres (37 mi) northwest of Vercelli. It lies at the confluence of the stream Sermenza with the Sesia river.

Balmuccia borders the following municipalities: Boccioleto, Cravagliana, Rossa, Scopa, and Vocca.
