= Vocca =

- Comune
- Comune di Vocca
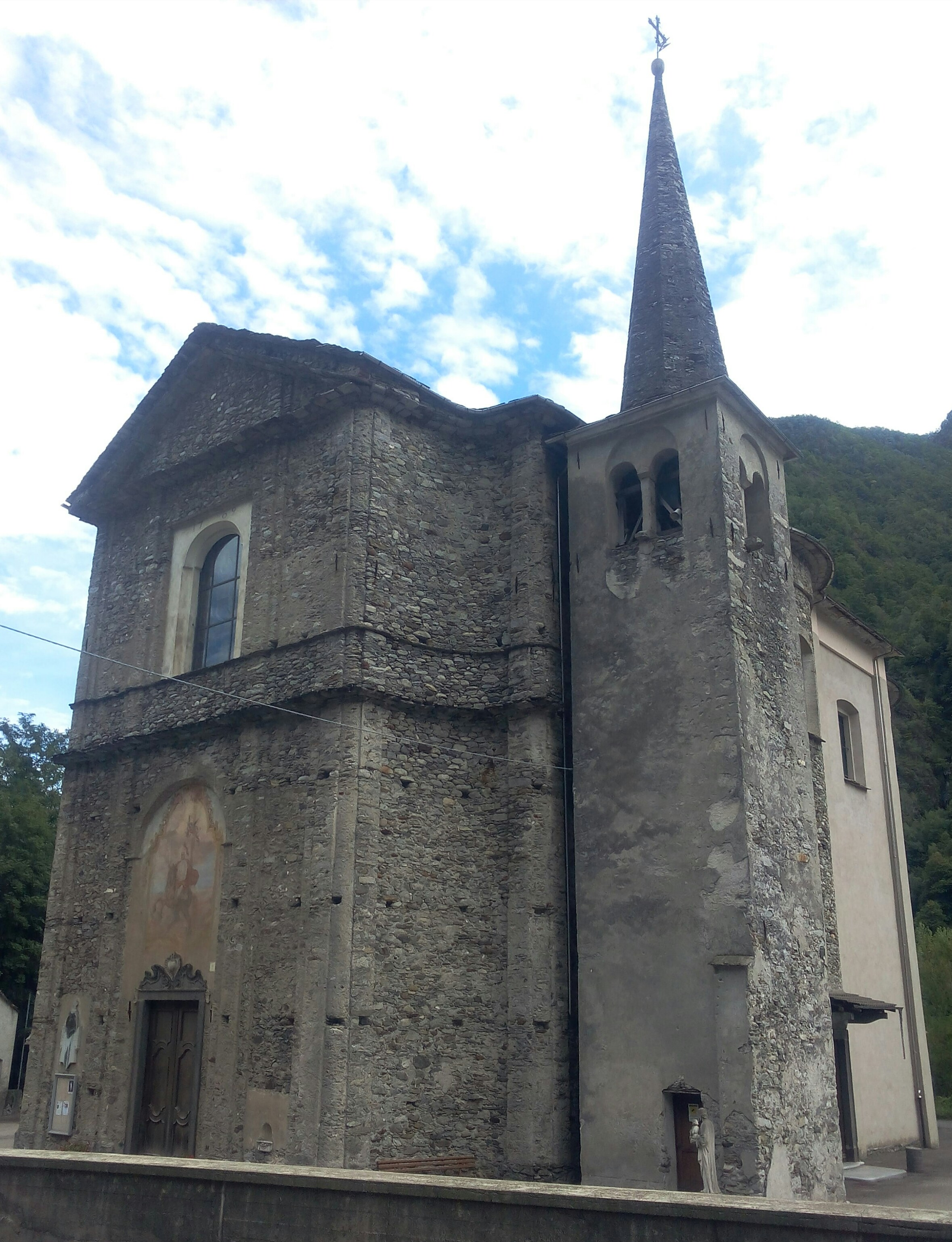
- Parish church.

- Coat of arms

- Location within Italy Location within Piedmont
- Coordinates: 45°50′N 8°12′E
- Country: Italy
- Region: Piedmont
- Province: Vercelli (VC)
  - Mayor: (Giacomo Gagliardini)

Area
  - Total: 20.1 km^{2} (7.8 sq mi)
- Elevation: 506 m (1,660 ft)

Population (Dec. 2004)
  - Total: 158
  - Density: 7.86/km^{2} (20.4/sq mi)
- Demonym: Vocchesi
- Time zone: UTC+1 (CET)
  - Summer (DST): UTC+2 (CEST)
- Postal code: 13020
- Dialing code: 0163
- Website: Official website

Vocca is a comune (municipality) in the Province of Vercelli in the Italian region Piedmont, located about 90 kilometres (56 mi) northeast of Turin and about 60 kilometres (37 mi) northwest of Vercelli.

Vocca borders the following municipalities: Balmuccia, Borgosesia, Cravagliana, Postua, Scopa, and Varallo Sesia.
