= Valsesian Autonomist Movement =

The Valsesian Autonomist Movement (Movimento Autonomista Valsesiano, MAV) was a regionalist political party active in Valsesia, a valley region in Piedmont, Italy.

The party was founded in 1980 by three members of the local section of the Italian Democratic Socialist Party and by the local leader of the Italian Liberal Party. The MAV elected some municipal councillors, but was soon eclipsed by the rise of broader parties such as Autonomist Piedmont, founding member of Lega Nord in 1991.
