= Guardabosone =

- Comune
- Comune di Guardabosone
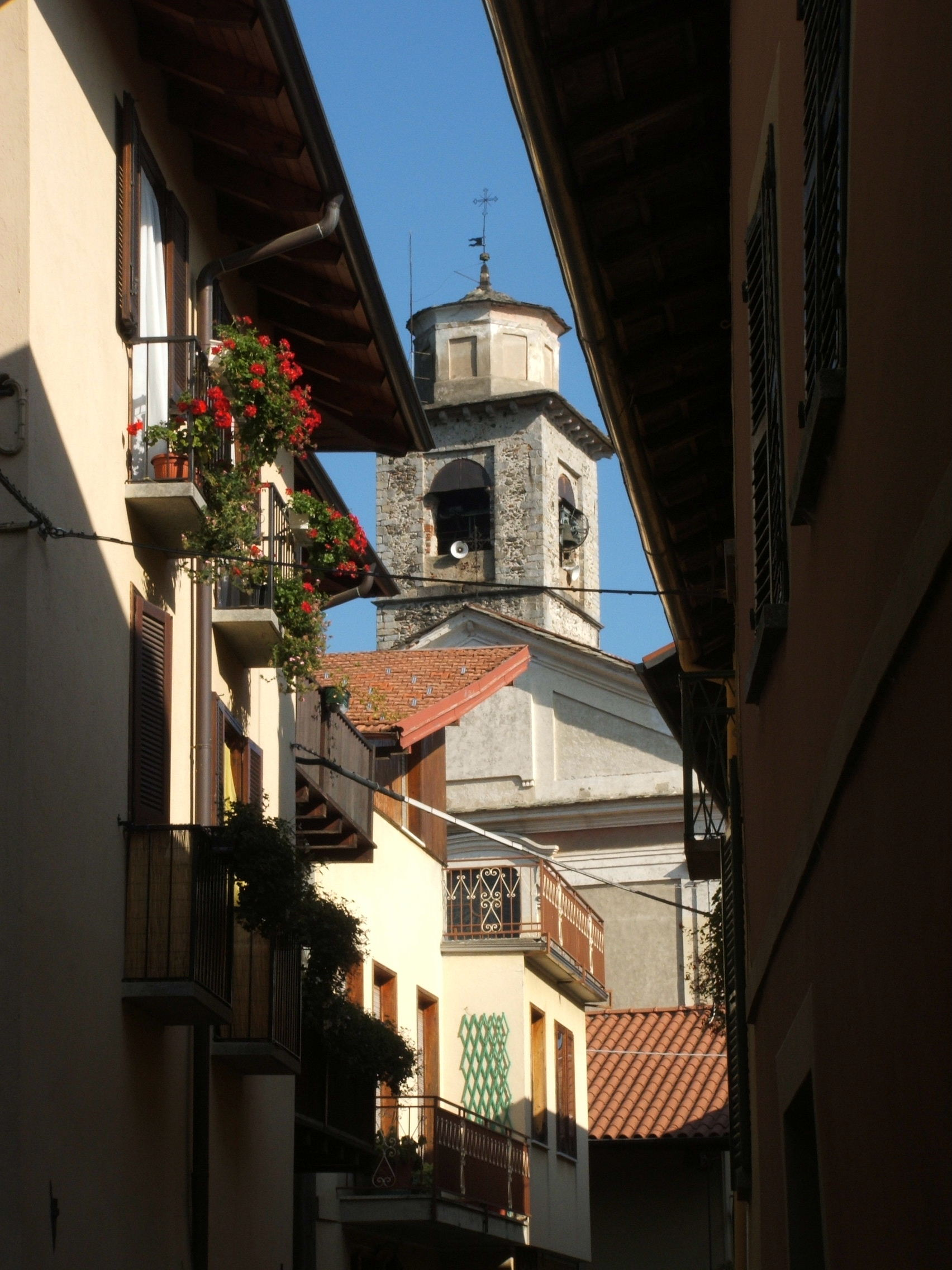

- Coat of arms

- Location within Italy Location within Piedmont
- Coordinates: 45°42′N 8°15′E
- Country: Italy
- Region: Piedmont
- Province: Vercelli (VC)

Government
  - Mayor: Claudio Zaninetti

Area
  - Total: 6.09 km^{2} (2.35 sq mi)
- Elevation: 479 m (1,572 ft)

Population (28 February 2017)
  - Total: 336
  - Density: 55.2/km^{2} (143/sq mi)
- Time zone: UTC+1 (CET)
  - Summer (DST): UTC+2 (CEST)
- Postal code: 13015
- Dialing code: 015

Guardabosone is a comune (municipality) in the Province of Vercelli in the Italian region Piedmont, located about 80 kilometres (50 mi) northeast of Turin and about 45 kilometres (28 mi) northwest of Vercelli.

Guardabosone borders the following municipalities: Ailoche, Borgosesia, Caprile, Crevacuore, Postua, Scopa, Scopello, and Serravalle Sesia.
