= Postua =

- Comune
- Comune di Postua
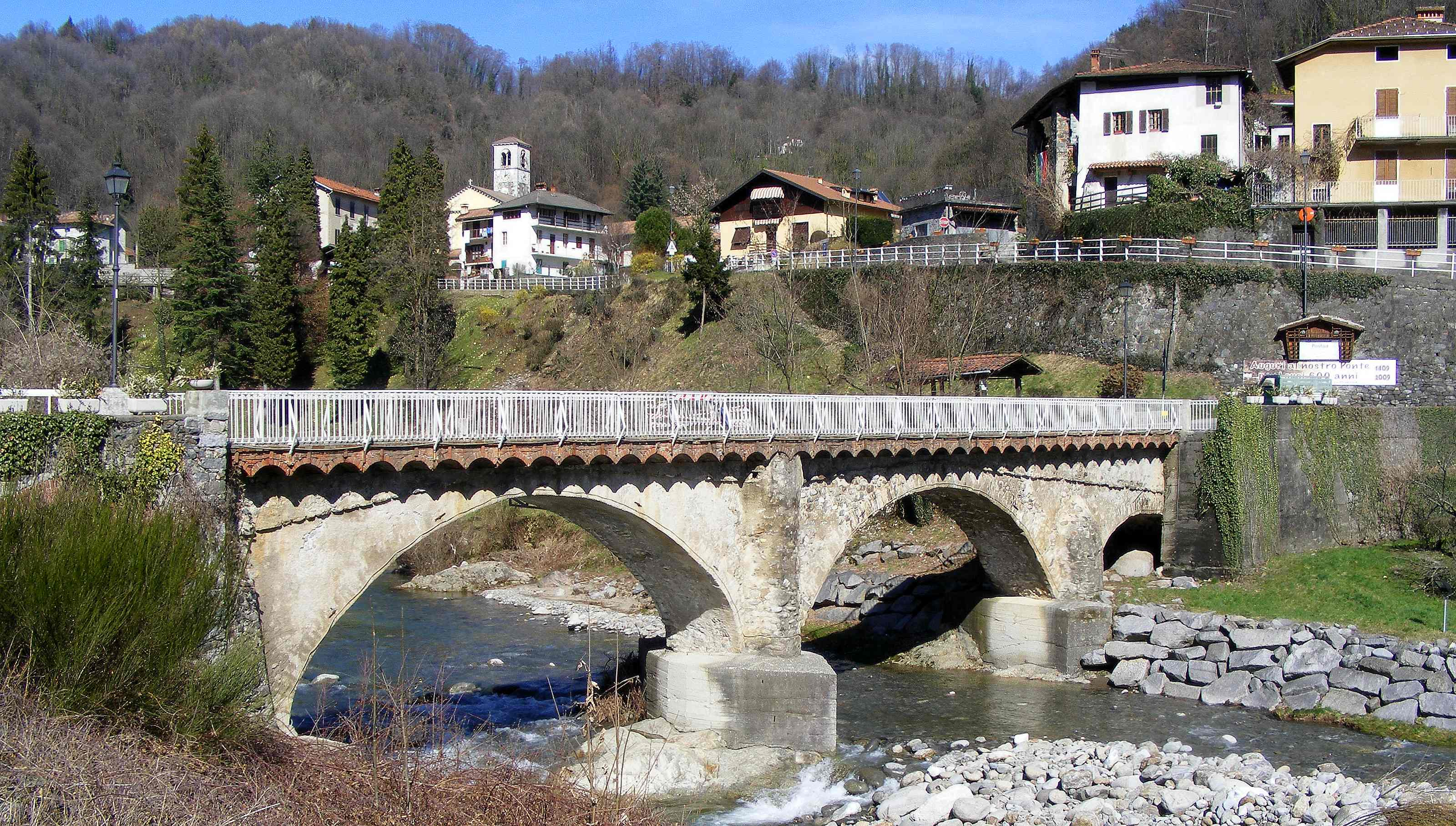
- The village behind the old bridge on the Strona

- Location within Italy Location within Piedmont
- Coordinates: 45°43′N 8°14′E
- Country: Italy
- Region: Piedmont
- Province: Vercelli (VC)

Government
  - Mayor: Maria Cristina Patrosso

Area
  - Total: 16.18 km^{2} (6.25 sq mi)
- Elevation: 459 m (1,506 ft)

Population (31 December 2010)
  - Total: 590
  - Density: 36/km^{2} (94/sq mi)
- Demonym: Postuesi
- Time zone: UTC+1 (CET)
  - Summer (DST): UTC+2 (CEST)
- Postal code: 13010
- Dialing code: 015

Postua is a comune (municipality) in the Province of Vercelli in the Italian region Piedmont, located about 80 kilometres (50 mi) northeast of Turin and about 45 kilometres (28 mi) northwest of Vercelli.

== Geography ==
Postua borders the following municipalities: Ailoche, Borgosesia, Caprile, Guardabosone, Scopa, and Vocca.
