= Caprile =

- Comune
- Comune di Caprile
- Location within Italy Location within Piedmont
- Coordinates: 45°42′N 8°15′E
- Country: Italy
- Region: Piedmont
- Province: Province of Biella (BI)

Area
  - Total: 11.4 km^{2} (4.4 sq mi)

Population (Dec. 2004)
  - Total: 221
  - Density: 19.4/km^{2} (50.2/sq mi)
- Demonym: Caprilesi
- Time zone: UTC+1 (CET)
  - Summer (DST): UTC+2 (CEST)
- Postal code: 13864
- Dialing code: 015

Caprile is a comune (municipality) in the Province of Biella in the Italian region Piedmont, located about 80 kilometres (50 mi) northeast of Turin and about 20 kilometres (12 mi) northeast of Biella. As of 31 December 2004, it had a population of 221 and an area of 11.4 square kilometres (4.4 mi^{2}).

Caprile borders the following municipalities: Ailoche, Coggiola, Crevacuore, Guardabosone, Portula, Postua, Pray, Scopello, Trivero.

== Demographic evolution ==
Historical population

Year	Pop.	±%
1861	629	—
1871	633	+0.6%
1881	687	+8.5%
1901	555	−19.2%
1911	599	+7.9%

Year	Pop.	±%
1921	550	−8.2%
1931	368	−33.1%
1936	360	−2.2%
1951	361	+0.3%
1961	356	−1.4%

Year	Pop.	±%
1971	294	−17.4%
1981	248	−15.6%
1991	220	−11.3%
2001	210	−4.5%

Source: Data from ISTAT
