= Boccioleto =

- Comune
- Comune di Boccioleto
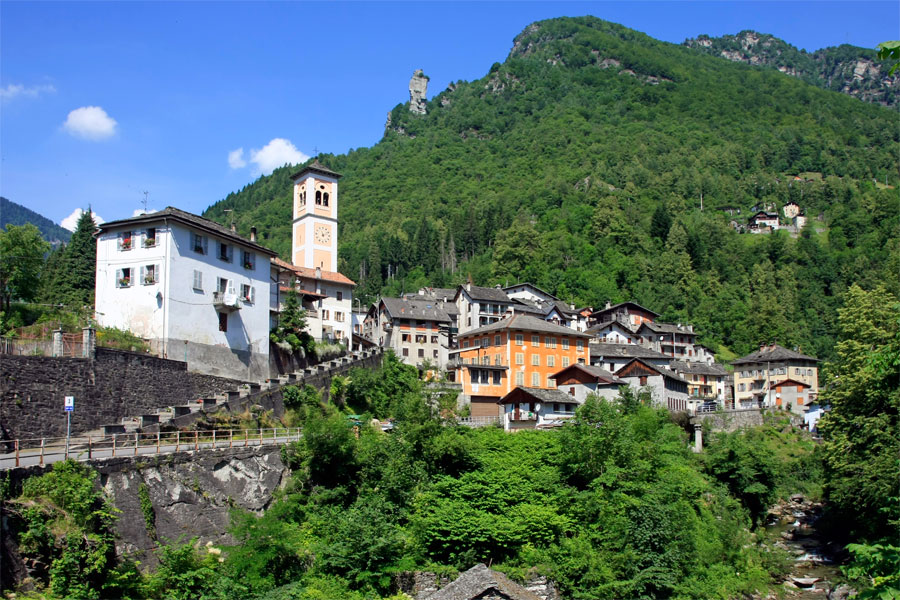

- Location within Italy Location within Piedmont
- Coordinates: 45°50′N 8°7′E
- Country: Italy
- Region: Piedmont
- Province: Vercelli (VC)

Government
  - Mayor: Walter Fiorone

Area
  - Total: 33.87 km^{2} (13.08 sq mi)
- Elevation: 667 m (2,188 ft)

Population (28 February 2017)
  - Total: 186
  - Density: 5.49/km^{2} (14.2/sq mi)
- Demonym: Boccioletesi
- Time zone: UTC+1 (CET)
  - Summer (DST): UTC+2 (CEST)
- Postal code: 13022
- Dialing code: 0163
- Website: Official website

Boccioleto is a comune (municipality) in the Province of Vercelli, in the Italian region Piedmont, located about 90 kilometres (56 mi) northeast of Turin and about 60 kilometres (37 mi) northwest of Vercelli.

Boccioleto borders the following municipalities: Alto Sermenza, Balmuccia, Campertogno, Mollia, Rossa, Scopa, and Scopello.

== Twin towns ==
Boccioleto is twinned with:

- Baia de Fier, Romania (2007)

== See also ==
- Oratorio di San Lorenzo all'alpe Seccio
