= Oratorio di San Lorenzo all'alpe Seccio =

Church building in Boccioleto, Italy

Oratory of Saint Lawrence all'alpe Seccio (Oratorio di San Lorenzo all'alpe Seccio)
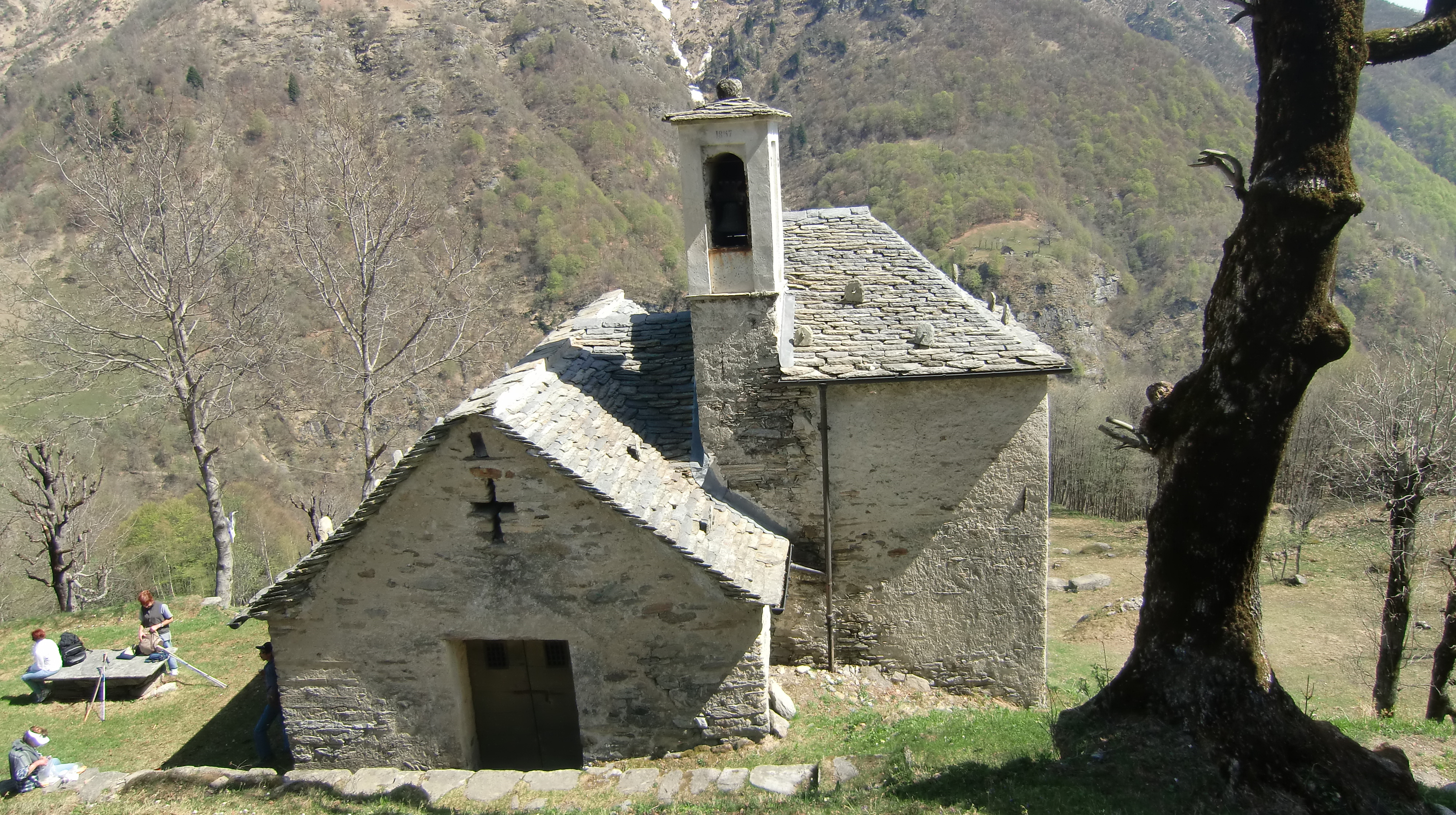
- Façade of the church.

Religion
- Affiliation: Roman Catholic
- Province: Vercelli
- Ecclesiastical or organisational status: National monument

Location
- Location: Boccioleto, Italy
- Interactive map of Oratory of Saint Lawrence all'alpe Seccio (Oratorio di San Lorenzo all'alpe Seccio)
- Coordinates: 45.855833°N 8.105278°E

Architecture
- Type: Church
- Style: Romanesque

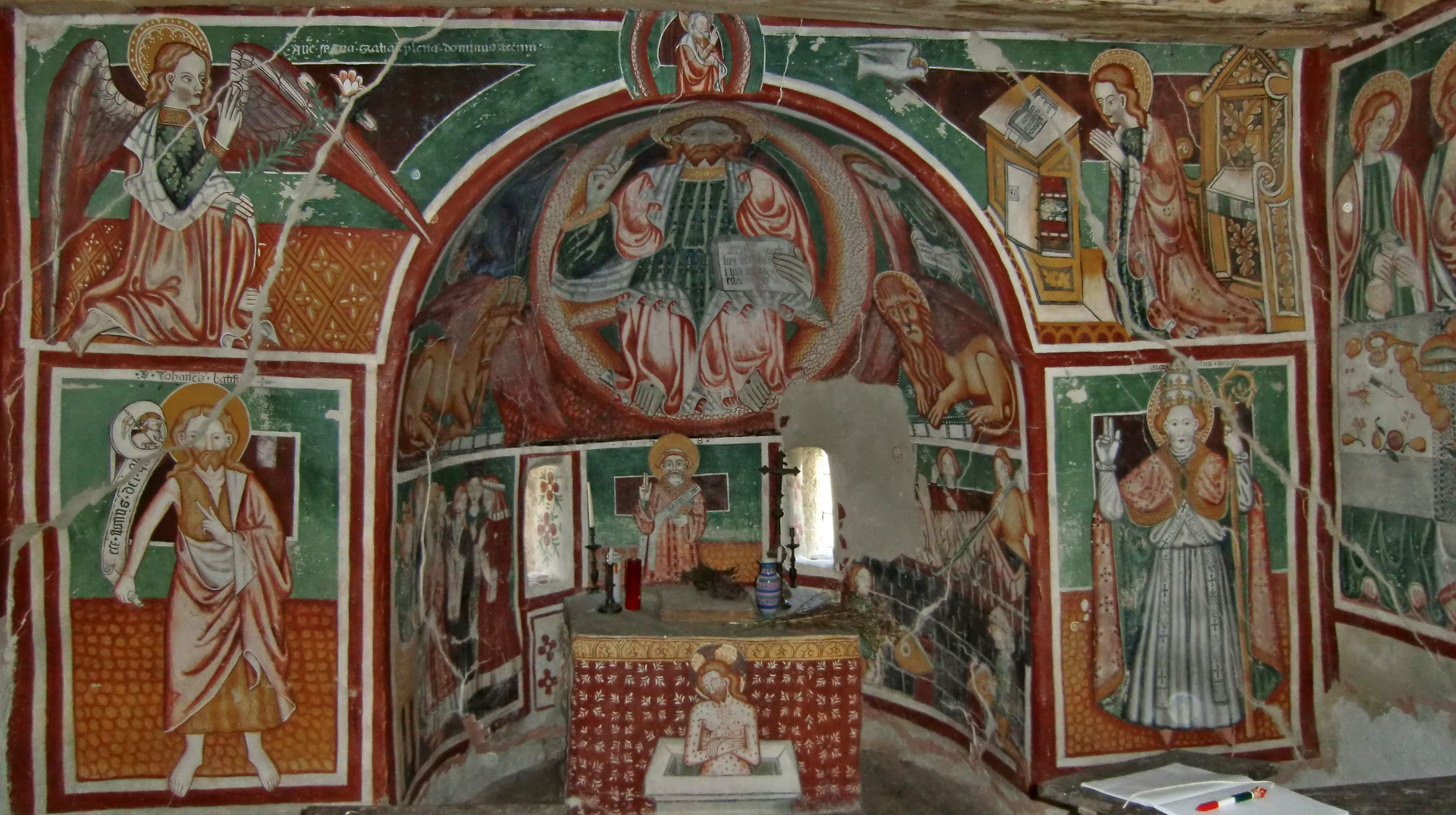
The frescos in the chancel

Oratory of Saint Lawrence all'alpe Seccio (Italian: Oratorio di San Lorenzo all'alpe Seccio is a Roman Catholic oratory in the village of Boccioleto, in the Province of Vercelli and the region of Piedmont, Italy.

The oratory situated 1380 metres above sea level is reachable only by a trail that winds through forests of beech trees until you reach the alpine pastures, overlooking Cavaione Valley, a side valley of the Sermenza Valley. The interior contains a cycle of frescoes painted by an unknown artist during the mid-fifteenth century.
