= Ailoche =

- Comune
- Comune di Ailoche
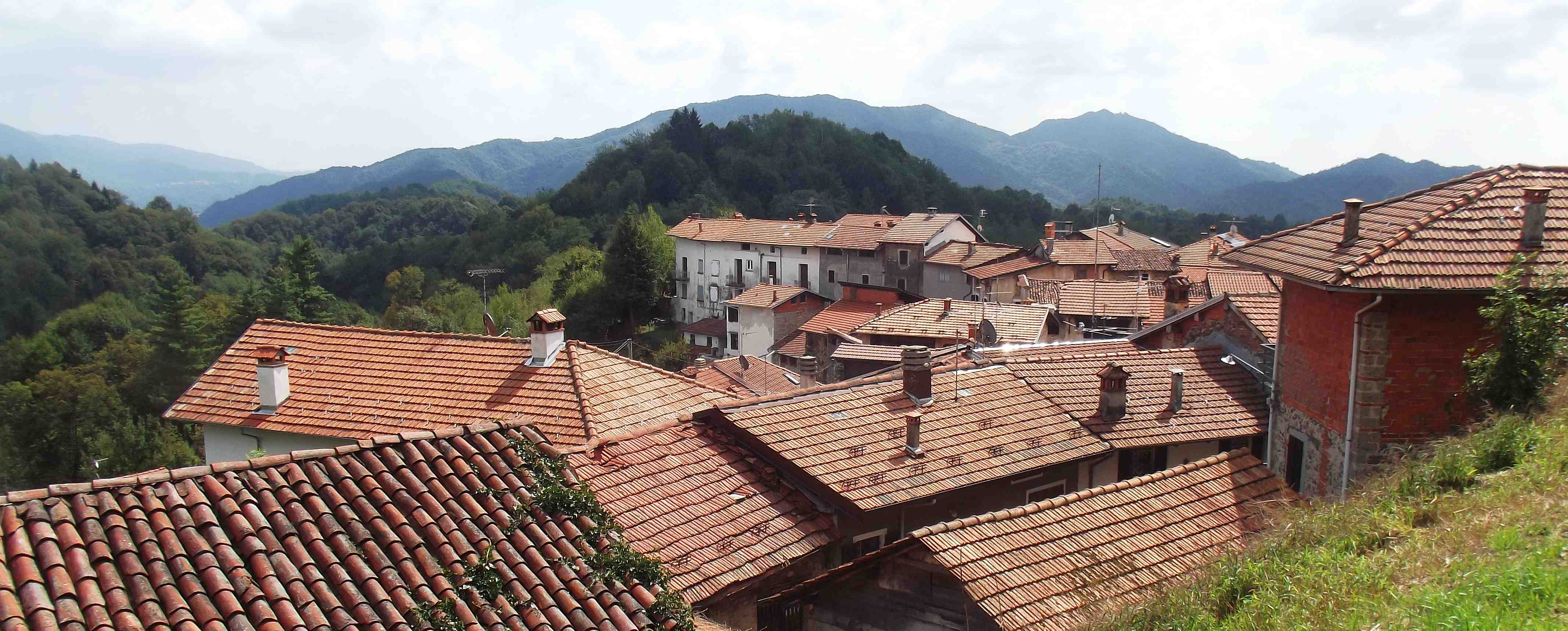
- The town as seen from the church

- Location of Ailoche in Italy Ailoche (Piedmont)
- Coordinates: 45°41′N 8°0′E
- Country: Italy
- Region: Piedmont
- Province: Biella (BI)
- Frazioni: Ailoche, Giunchio, Peiro, Ponte Strona, Piasca, Venarolo

Government
  - Mayor: Massimo Langhi

Area
  - Total: 10.78 km^{2} (4.16 sq mi)
- Elevation: 569 m (1,867 ft)

Population (31 December 2021)
  - Total: 314
  - Density: 29.1/km^{2} (75.4/sq mi)
- Demonym: Ailochesi
- Time zone: UTC+1 (CET)
  - Summer (DST): UTC+2 (CEST)
- Postal code: 13010
- Dialing code: 015
- Website: Official website

Ailoche is a comune (municipality) in the Province of Biella in the Italian region Piedmont, located about 70 kilometres (43 mi) northeast of Turin and about 14 kilometres (9 mi) northwest of Biella.

Ailoche borders the following municipalities: Caprile, Coggiola, Crevacuore, Guardabosone, Postua. Sights include the Santuario della Brugarola.
