= Scopa, Piedmont =

Scopa
- Comune
- Comune di Scopa
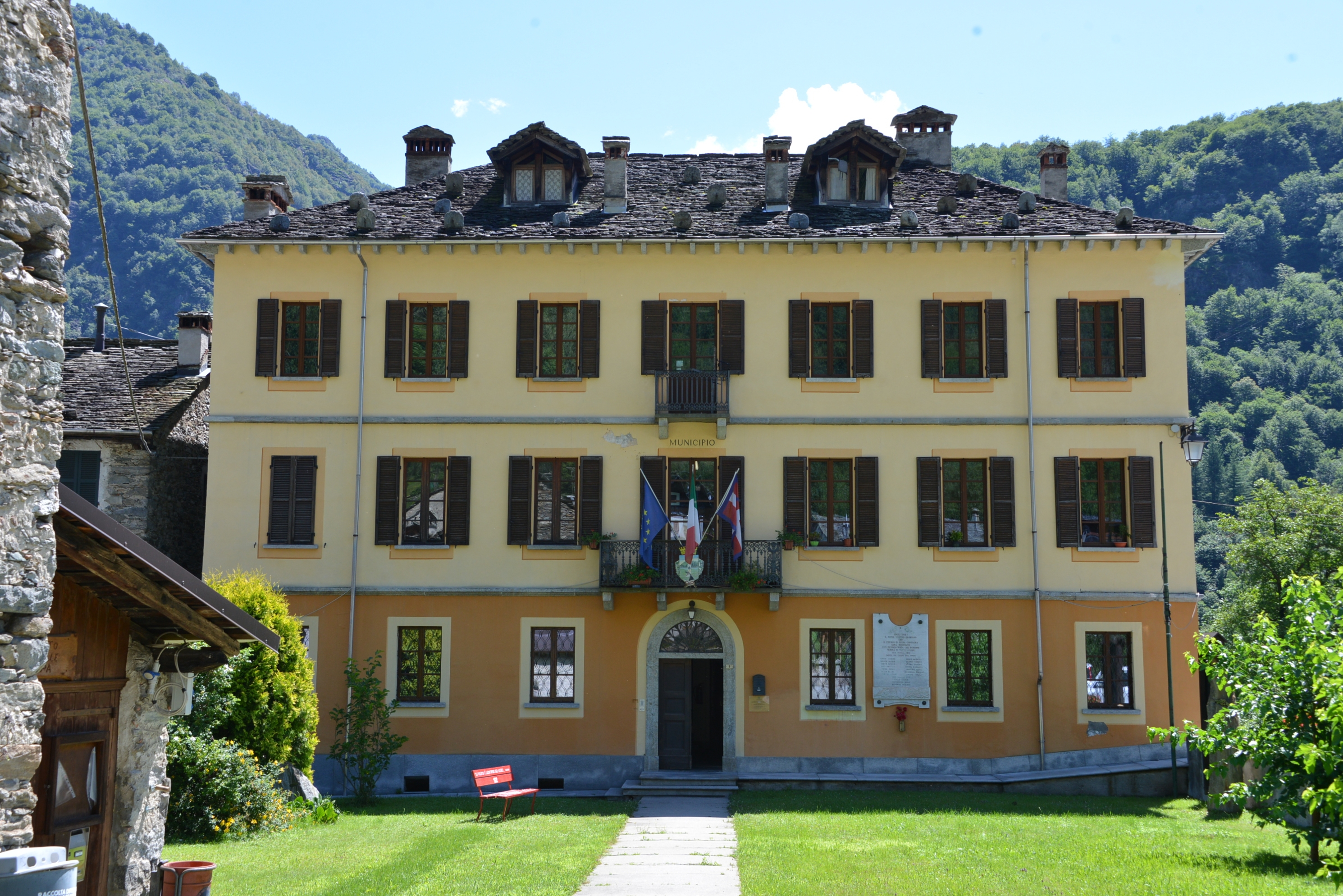

- Coat of arms

- Location within Italy Location within Piedmont
- Coordinates: 45°47′N 8°7′E
- Country: Italy
- Region: Piedmont
- Province: Vercelli (VC)

Government
  - Mayor: Cesare Farina

Area
  - Total: 22.53 km^{2} (8.70 sq mi)
- Elevation: 622 m (2,041 ft)

Population (31 December 2015)
  - Total: 381
  - Density: 16.9/km^{2} (43.8/sq mi)
- Demonym: Scopesi
- Time zone: UTC+1 (CET)
  - Summer (DST): UTC+2 (CEST)
- Postal code: 13027
- Dialing code: 0163
- Website: Official website

Scopa is a comune (municipality) in the Province of Vercelli in the Italian region Piedmont, located about 90 kilometres (56 mi) northeast of Turin and about 60 kilometres (37 mi) northwest of Vercelli.

Scopa borders the following municipalities: Balmuccia, Boccioleto, Guardabosone, Postua, Scopello, and Vocca.
