= Campertogno =

- Comune
- Comune di Campertogno
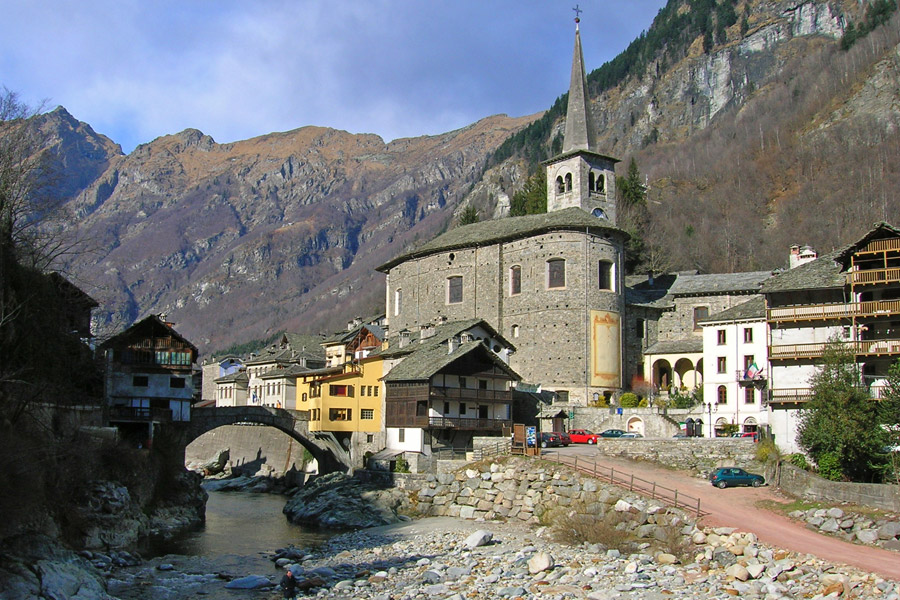

- Location within Italy Location within Piedmont
- Coordinates: 45°48′N 8°2′E
- Country: Italy
- Region: Piedmont
- Province: Vercelli (VC)

Government
  - Mayor: Paolo Vimercati Sozzi De Capitani

Area
  - Total: 34.0 km^{2} (13.1 sq mi)
- Elevation: 827 m (2,713 ft)

Population (28 February 2017)
  - Total: 235
  - Density: 6.91/km^{2} (17.9/sq mi)
- Demonym: Campertognini
- Time zone: UTC+1 (CET)
  - Summer (DST): UTC+2 (CEST)
- Postal code: 13023
- Dialing code: 0163
- Patron saint: St. James
- Saint day: 25 July
- Website: Official website

Campertogno is a comune (municipality) in the Province of Vercelli in the Italian region Piedmont, located about 90 kilometres (56 mi) northeast of Turin and about 60 kilometres (37 mi) northwest of Vercelli.

Campertogno borders the following municipalities: Boccioleto, Mollia, Piode, Rassa, Riva Valdobbia, and Scopello.

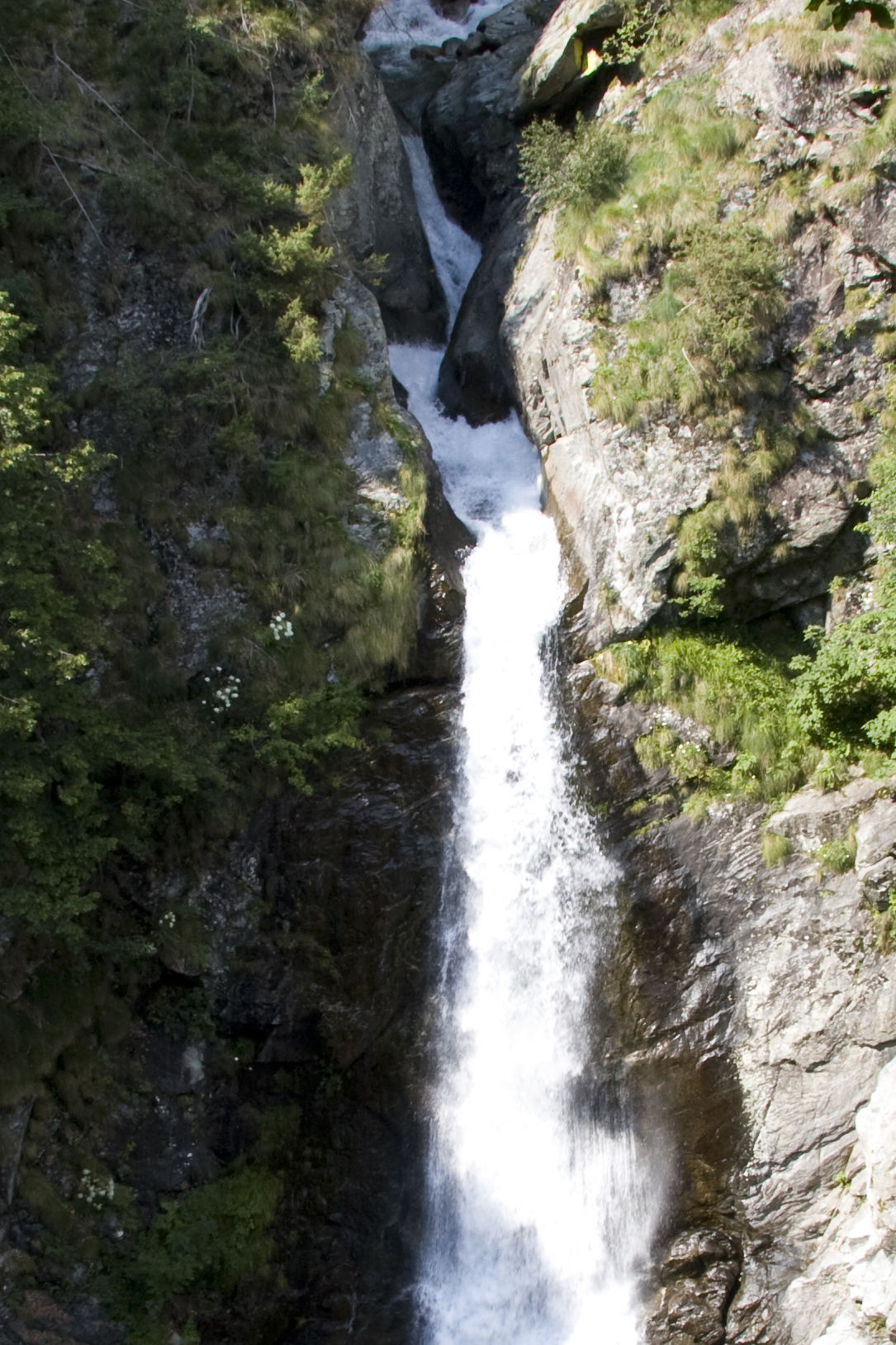
waterfall of Tinaccio
