= Piode =

- Comune
- Comune di Piode
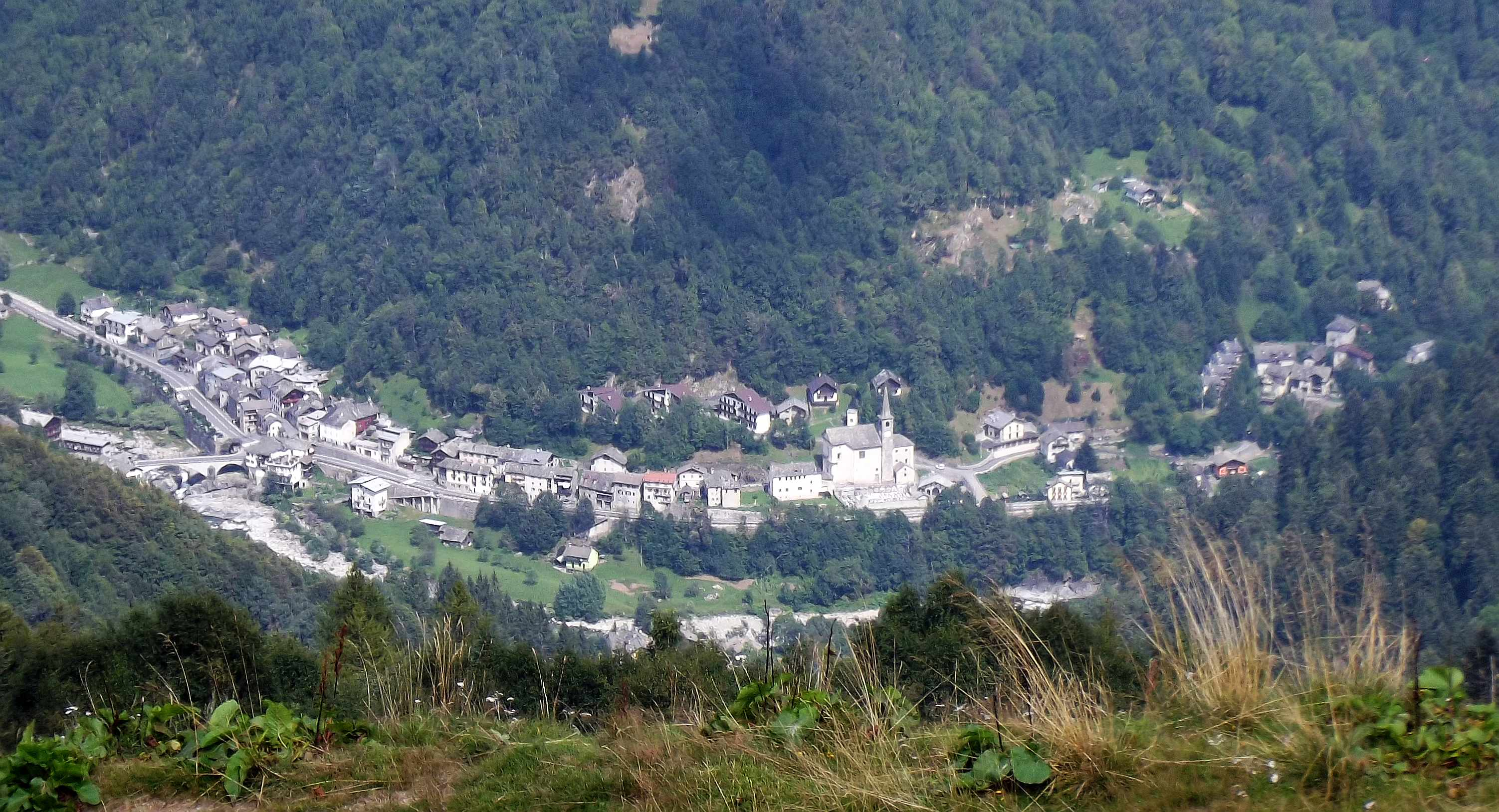
- Panorama from alpe Meggiana

- Coat of arms

- Location within Italy Location within Piedmont
- Coordinates: 45°46′N 8°3′E
- Country: Italy
- Region: Piedmont
- Province: Vercelli (VC)

Government
  - Mayor: Donato Ferraris

Area
  - Total: 13.6 km^{2} (5.3 sq mi)

Population (Dec. 2004)
  - Total: 205
  - Density: 15.1/km^{2} (39.0/sq mi)
- Time zone: UTC+1 (CET)
  - Summer (DST): UTC+2 (CEST)
- Postal code: 13020
- Dialing code: 0163

Piode (Piedmontese: Piòvi) is a comune (municipality) and village of Valsesia in the Province of Vercelli in the Italian region Piedmont, located about 80 kilometres (50 mi) northeast of Turin and about 60 kilometres (37 mi) northwest of Vercelli.

The name "Piode" refers to the many local quarries for the extraction of the stone slabs known as piodi, which are traditionally used to clad the roofs of Alpine houses and baite.

Piode borders the following municipalities: Campertogno, Pettinengo, Pila, Rassa, and Scopello.

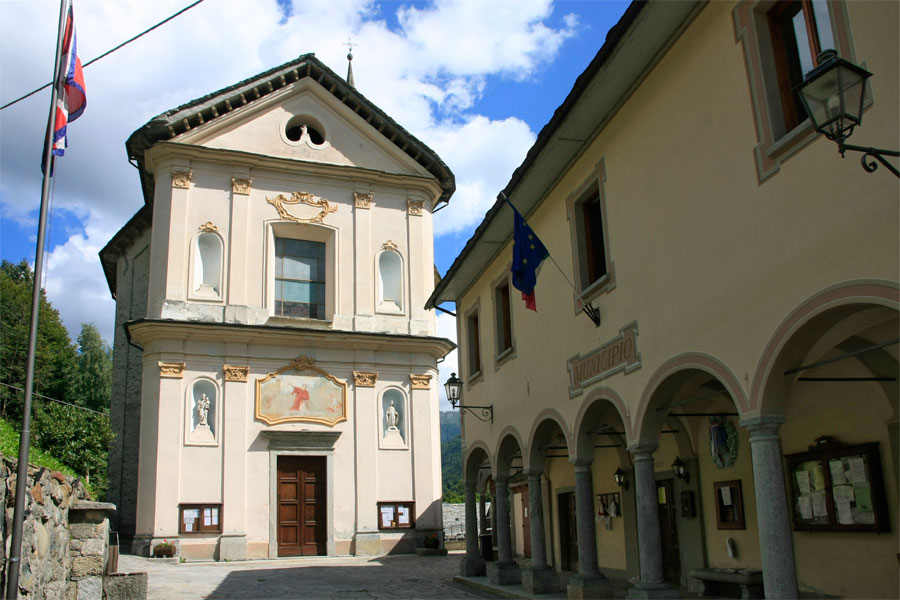
Parish Church and town Hall

== Demographic evolution ==
Historical population

Year	Pop.	±%
1861	479	—
1871	463	−3.3%
1881	511	+10.4%
1901	442	−13.5%
1911	405	−8.4%

Year	Pop.	±%
1921	425	+4.9%
1931	293	−31.1%
1936	263	−10.2%
1951	233	−11.4%
1961	219	−6.0%

Year	Pop.	±%
1971	202	−7.8%
1981	195	−3.5%
1991	182	−6.7%
2001	197	+8.2%

Source: Data from ISTAT
