= Crevacuore =

Municipality in Piedmont, Italy

- Comune
- Comune di Crevacuore
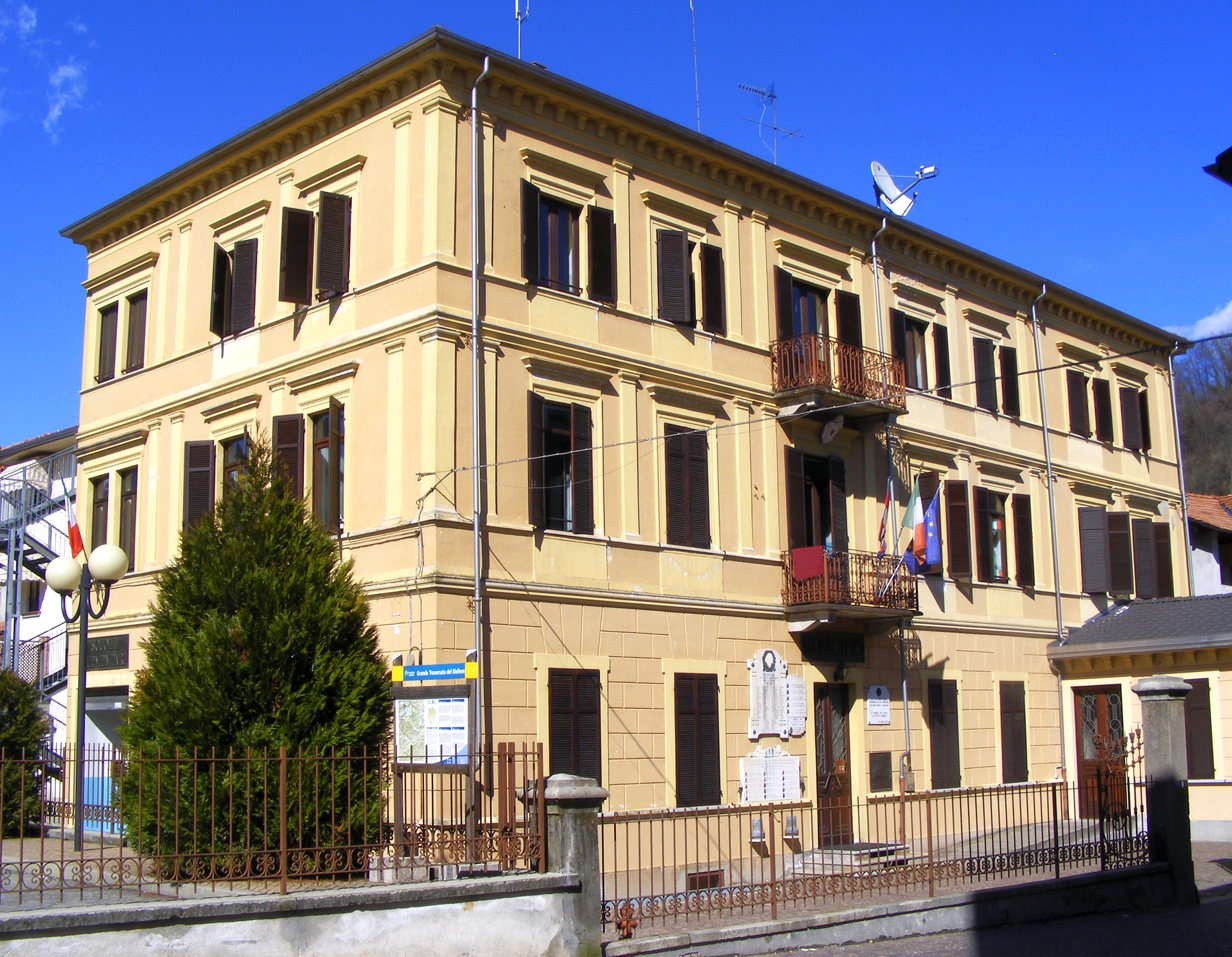
- Town hall

- Location within Italy Location within Piedmont
- Coordinates: 45°42′N 8°15′E
- Country: Italy
- Region: Piedmont
- Province: Province of Biella (BI)

Area
  - Total: 8.3 km^{2} (3.2 sq mi)

Population (Dec. 2004)
  - Total: 1,813
  - Density: 220/km^{2} (570/sq mi)
- Time zone: UTC+1 (CET)
  - Summer (DST): UTC+2 (CEST)
- Postal code: 13015
- Dialing code: 015

Crevacuore is a comune (municipality) in the Province of Biella in the Italian region Piedmont, located about 80 kilometres (50 mi) northeast of Turin and about 20 kilometres (12 mi) northeast of Biella. As of 31 December 2004, it had a population of 1,813 and an area of 8.3 square kilometres (3.2 mi^{2}).

Crevacuore borders the following municipalities: Ailoche, Caprile, Curino, Guardabosone, Pray, Scopello, Serravalle Sesia, Sostegno, Trivero.

== Demographic evolution ==
Historical population

Year	Pop.	±%
1861	1,137	—
1871	1,128	−0.8%
1881	1,184	+5.0%
1901	1,247	+5.3%
1911	1,519	+21.8%

Year	Pop.	±%
1921	1,607	+5.8%
1931	1,867	+16.2%
1936	1,940	+3.9%
1951	2,196	+13.2%
1961	2,317	+5.5%

Year	Pop.	±%
1971	2,455	+6.0%
1981	2,219	−9.6%
1991	1,935	−12.8%
2001	1,876	−3.0%

Source: Data from ISTAT
