= Valsesia =

Group of valleys in Piedmont in the province of Vercelli, Italy

Coordinates: 45°49′N 8°08′E

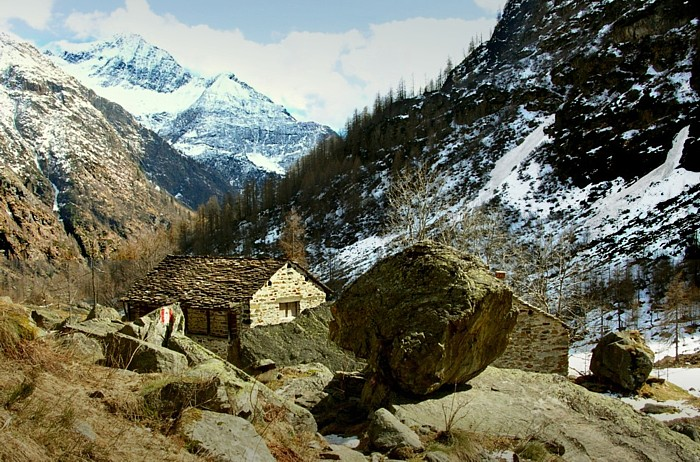
- The upper Valsesia

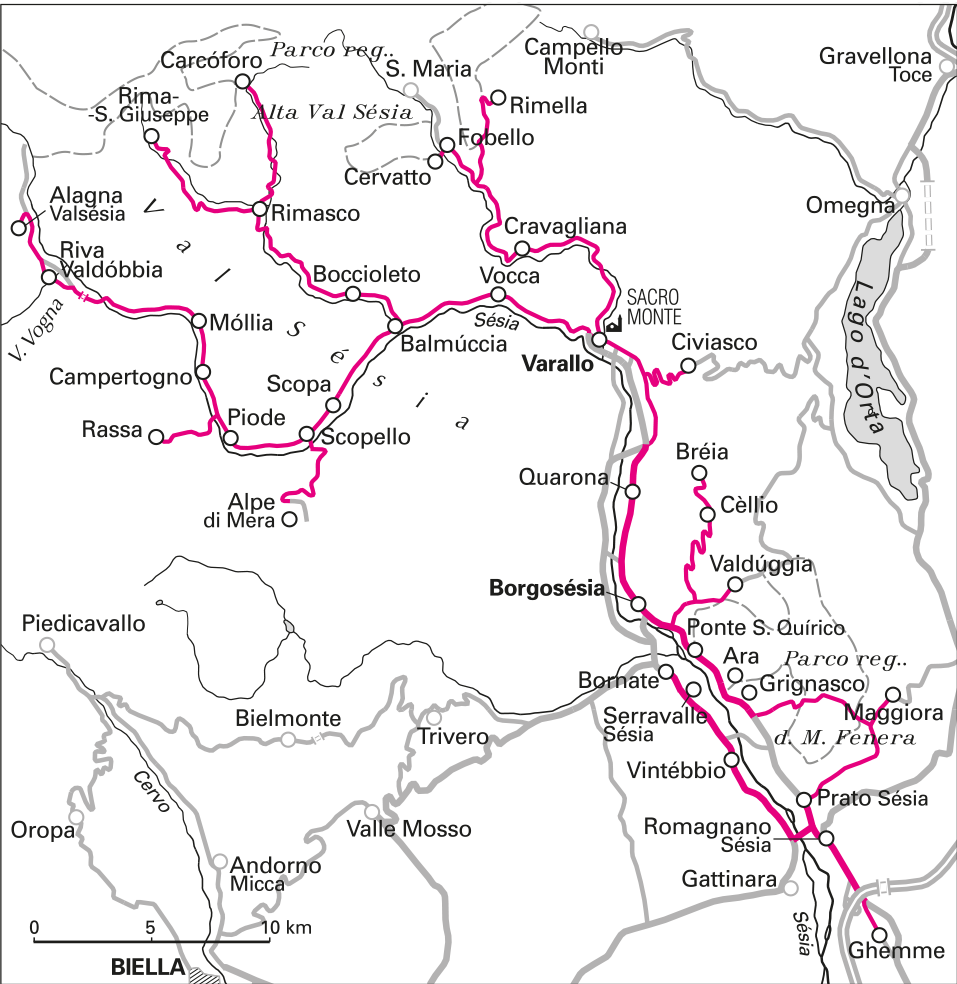
- Map of Valsesia
- Floor elevation: 340 m (1,120 ft)
- Long-axis direction: NW - SW

Geology
- Type: River valley

Geography
- Location: Vercelli, Italy

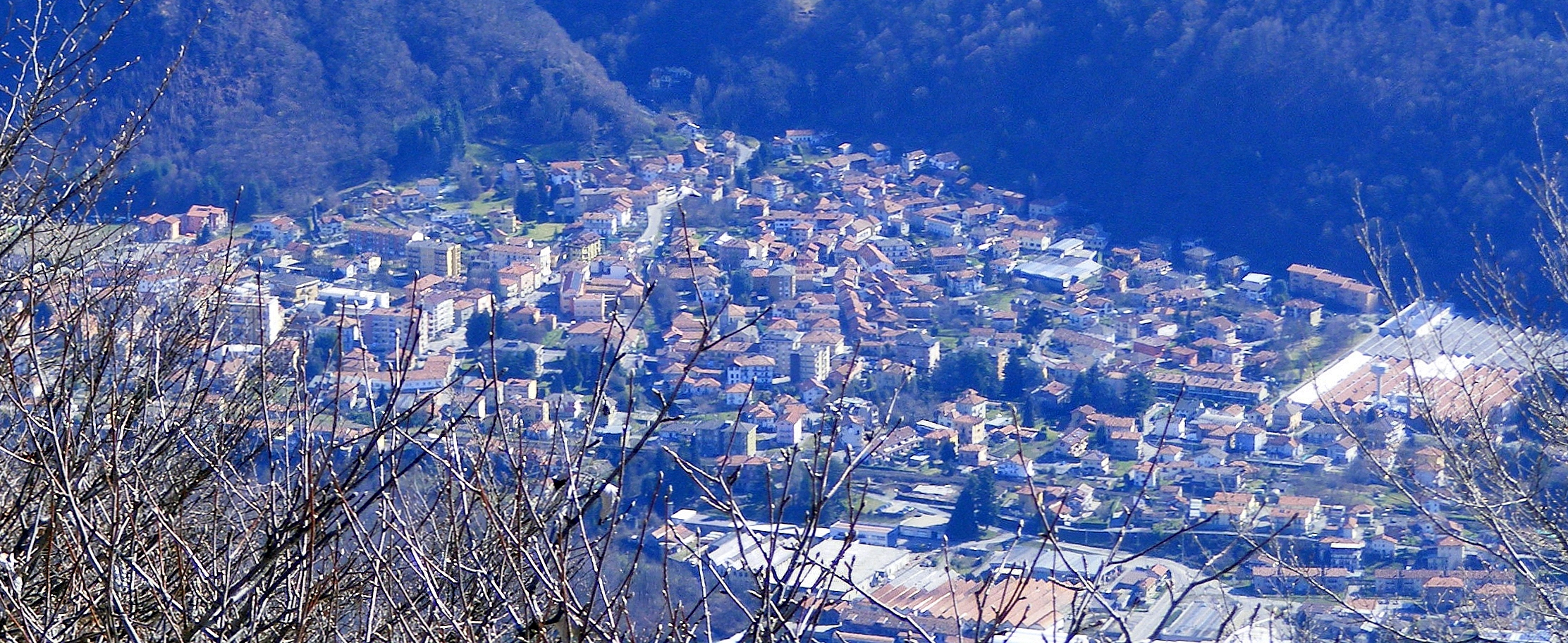
Quarona from Monte Tovo

Valsesia (Piedmontese: Valsesia; Walser German: Tseschrutol) is a group of valleys in the north-east of Piedmont in the Province of Vercelli, Italy; the principal valley is that of the river Sesia.

The major towns located here are Varallo Sesia, Borgosesia, Quarona and Valduggia; tourist villages include Alagna Valsesia, Rima San Giuseppe, Carcoforo and Scopello. While the valley mainly belongs to the province of Vercelli three of its comuni, namely Romagnano Sesia, Prato Sesia and Grignasco, are part of the province of Novara; however, they are not historically part of Valsesia but only geographically.

== Business ==
There are some industries in the lower towns of Varallo, Borgosesia, Quarona and Valduggia. These are mainly the textile industry and precision engineering companies. Agriculture is also practised on the hills along the river Sesia, the wine from Gattinara, which also bears this name, is well known. The higher areas live mainly off of handicrafts and tourism, with both mountain hikers in summer and skiers in winter being addressed. Several stages of the 55-day long-distance hiking trail Grande Traversata delle Alpi run along the north side of the valley. The area around Alagna is developed with lifts, mountain huts and slopes for summer and winter sports.

== See also ==
- Punta Lazoney

== Summits ==
Summits that surround the valley include:

- Punta Gnifetti – 4,554 m (14,941 ft)
- Punta Parrot – 4,432 m (14,541 ft)
- Ludwigshöhe – 4,342 m (14,245 ft)
- Corno Nero – 4,322 m (14,180 ft)
- Corno Bianco – 3,320 m (10,890 ft)
- Monte Tagliaferro – 2,964 m (9,724 ft)
