= Sesia =

River in Piedmont, north-western Italy

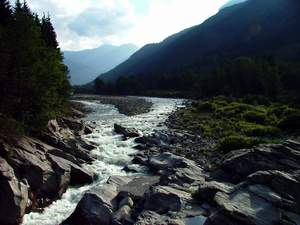
- The river in the upper Valsesia

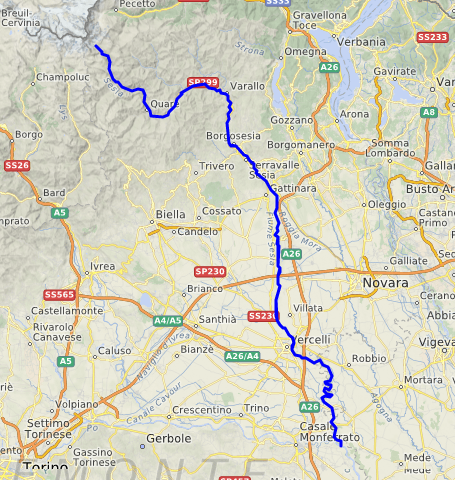
- Location of the Sesia in Italy

Location
- Country: Italy

Physical characteristics
- Source
  - location: Alagna Valsesia
  - elevation: 4,500 m (14,800 ft)
- Mouth: Po
  - coordinates: 45°07′59″N 8°34′24″E
- Length: 139.6 km (86.7 mi)
- Basin size: 3,037.6 km^{2} (1,172.8 mi^{2})
- Discharge
  - average: (mouth) 70.4 m^{3}/s (2,490 cu ft/s)

Basin features
- Progression: Po→ Adriatic Sea
- Tributaries
  - left: Sermenza, Mastallone, Pascone, Strona di Valduggia.
  - right: Otro, Vogna, Artogna, Sorba, rio di Valmala, Sessera, Cervo, Naviglio di Ivrea (artificial canal), Bona, Marcova

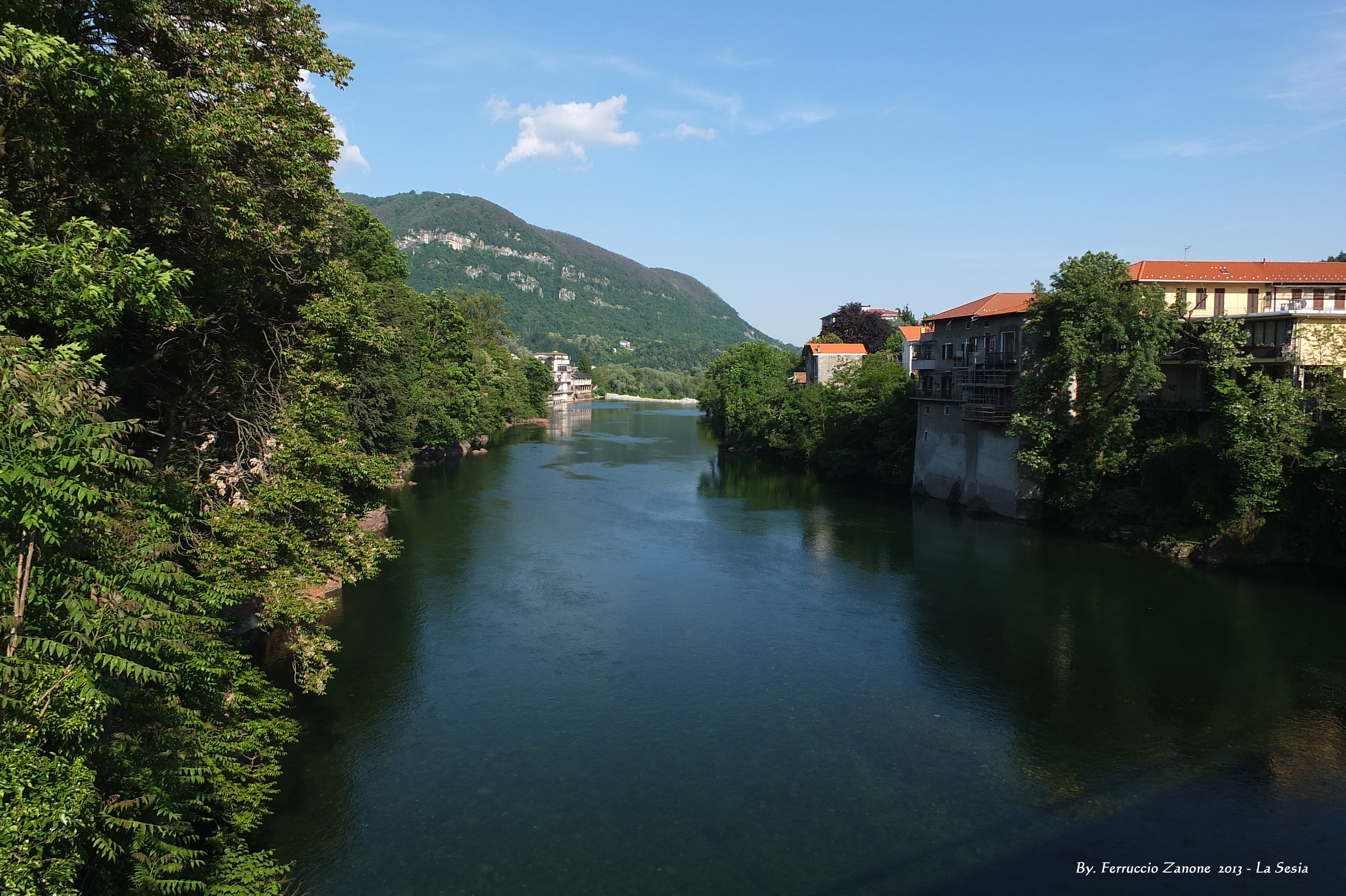
River Sesia in Borgosesia, Piemonte, Italy

The Sesia (Latin Sesites or Sessites) is a river in Piedmont, north-western Italy, tributary to the Po.

== Geography ==
Its sources are the glaciers of Monte Rosa at the border with Switzerland. It flows through the Alpine valley Valsesia and the towns Varallo Sesia, Quarona, Borgosesia and Vercelli. The Sesia flows into the Po River near Casale Monferrato.

== Main tributaries ==
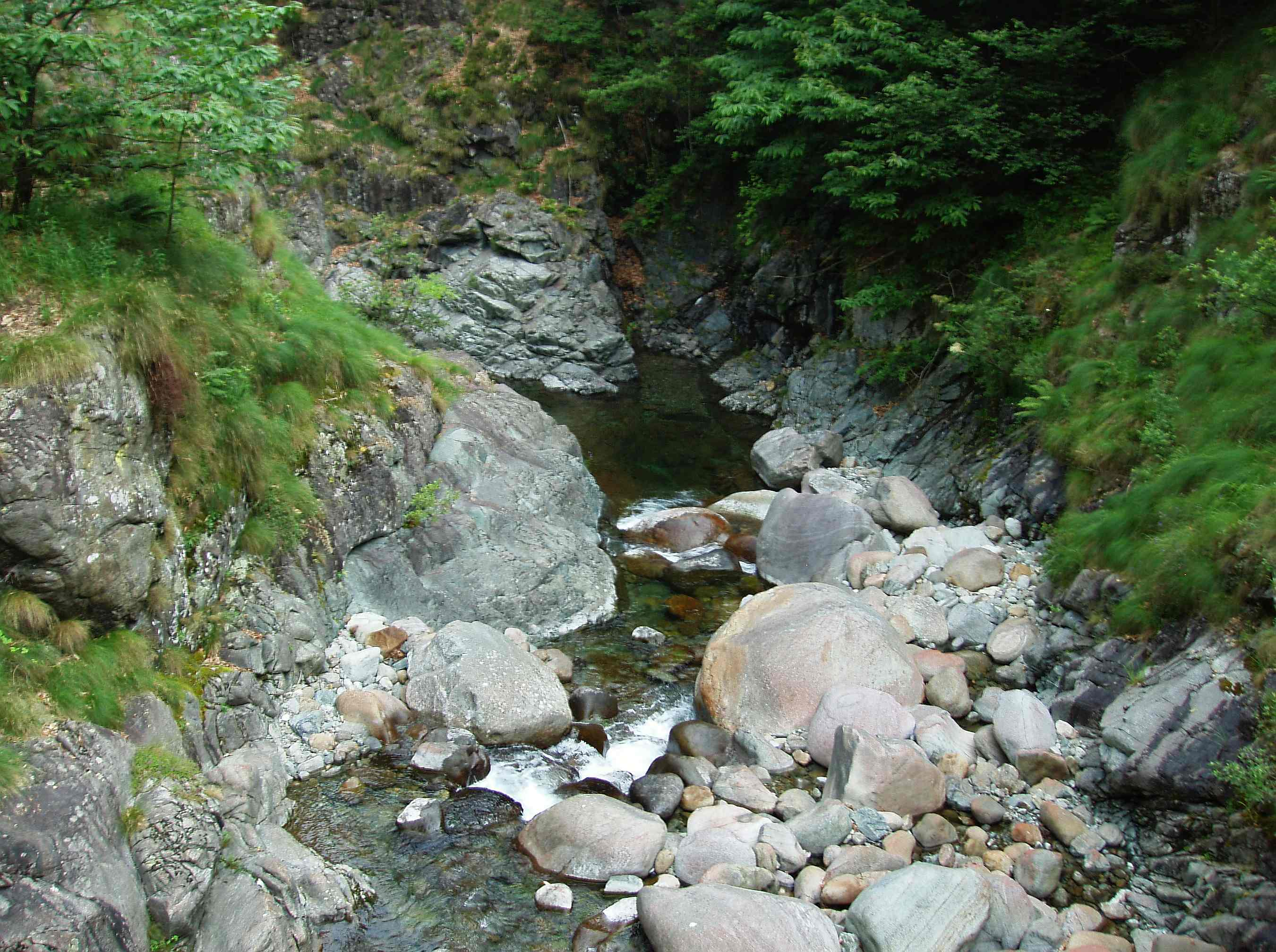
Rio di Valmala

- Left hand tributaries:
  - Sermenza,
  - Mastallone,
  - Pascone,
  - Strona di Valduggia.
- Right hand tributaries:
  - Sorba,
  - Sessera,
  - Cervo,
  - Naviglio di Ivrea,
  - Bona,
  - Marcova,
  - Roggia Stura.

== Sport and leisure ==
It is a popular river for kayaking and hosted the European championship in 2001 and the world championship in 2002.

== See also ==
- Sesia (département), First French Empire
