= Borgosesia =

- Comune
- Città di Borgosesia
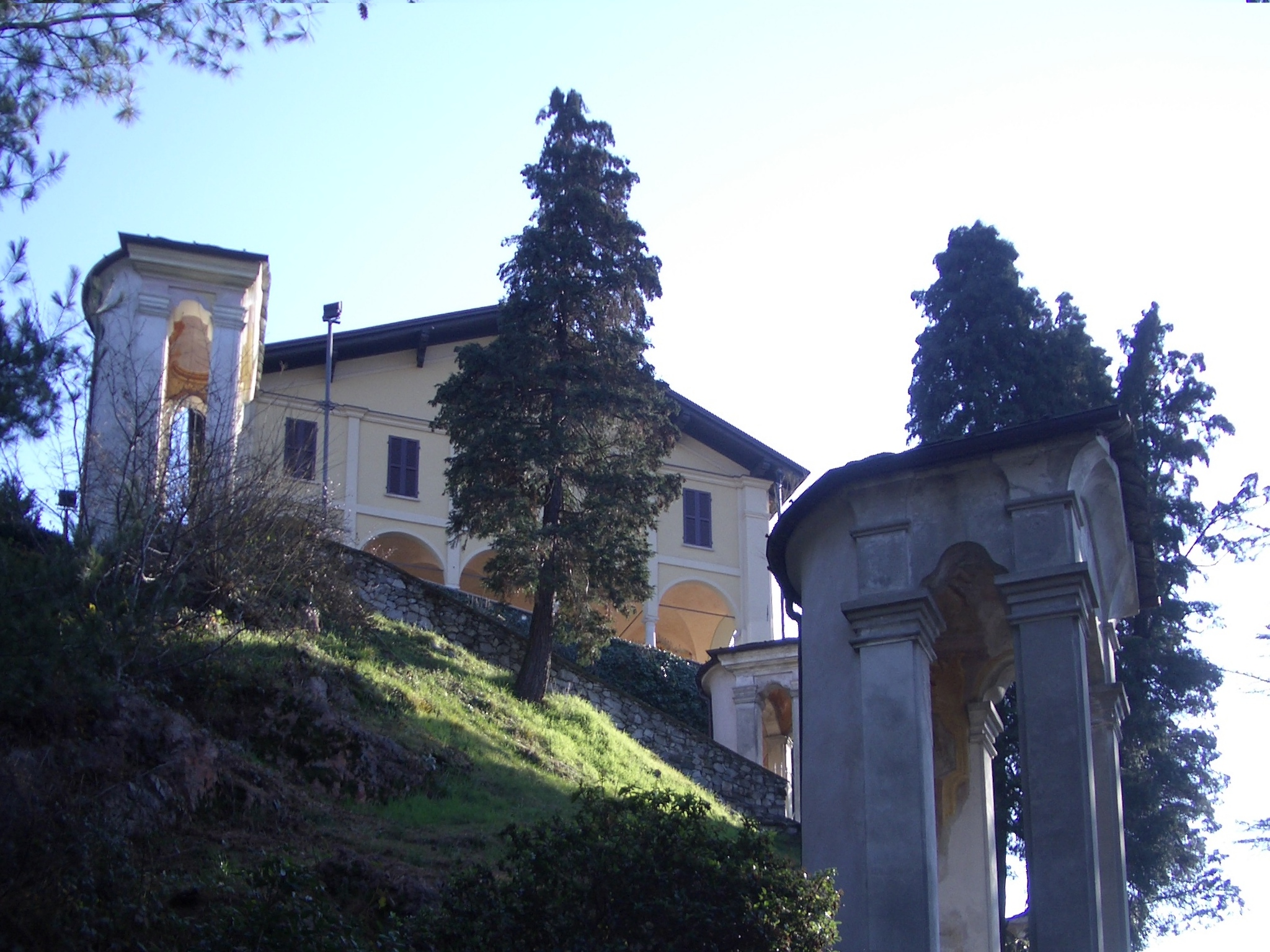
- Sacro Monte of Montrigone, with the Sanctuary of Sant'Anna.

- Coat of arms

- Location within Italy Location within Piedmont
- Coordinates: 45°43′N 8°16′E
- Country: Italy
- Region: Piedmont
- Province: Vercelli (VC)
- Frazioni: Agnona, Albergate, Aranco, Bastia, Bettole, Brina, Cà di Rondo, Cadegatti, Caggi, Calco di mezzo, Calco inferiore, Calco superiore, Caneto, Cardolino, Cartiglia, Cascina Agnona, Cesolo, Costa di Foresto, Costa inferiore, Costa superiore, Cravo, Fenera Annunziata, Fenera di mezzo, Fenera San Giulio, Ferruta, Foresto, Fornace, Frasca, Gianinetta, Guardella, Isolella, Lovario, Marasco, Molino delle Piode, Orlongo, Pianaccia, Pianezza, Plello, Rozzo, Sella, Torame, Trebbie, Vanzone, Valbusaga, Valmiglione, Villa San Giovanni

Government
  - Mayor: Paolo Tiramani (Civic List)

Area
  - Total: 41.09 km^{2} (15.86 sq mi)
- Elevation: 354 m (1,161 ft)

Population (30 April 2017)
  - Total: 12,765
  - Density: 310.7/km^{2} (804.6/sq mi)
- Demonym: Borgosesiani
- Time zone: UTC+1 (CET)
  - Summer (DST): UTC+2 (CEST)
- Postal code: 13011
- Dialing code: 0163
- Patron saint: Paolo Tiramani
- Saint day: 29 June
- Website: Official website

Borgosesia is a comune (municipality) in the Province of Vercelli in the Italian region Piedmont, located about 80 kilometres (50 mi) northeast of Turin and about 45 kilometres (28 mi) north of Vercelli.

The largest town in Valsesia, it is crossed by the Sesia River.

== History ==
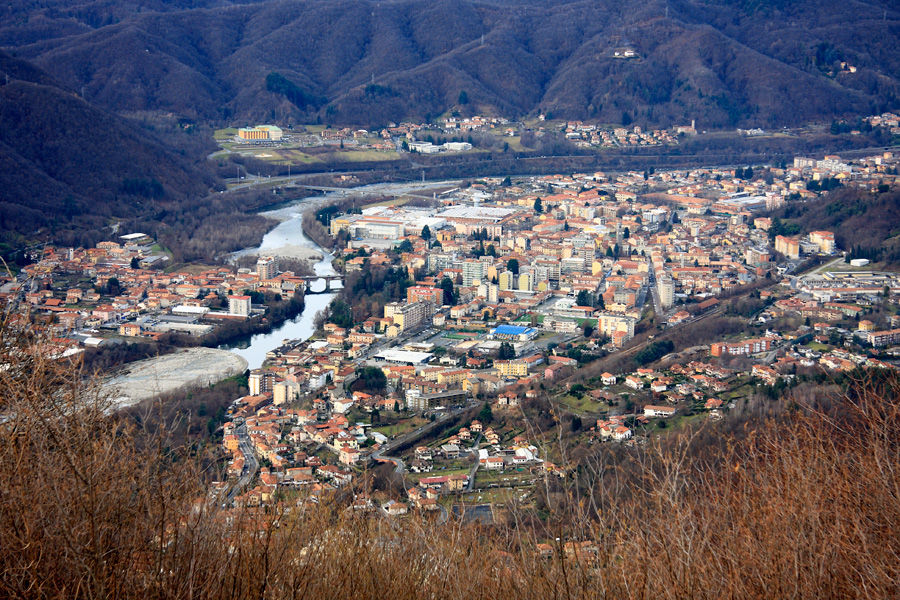
Borgosesia from Monte Fenera

The town was founded in 14 BC by the native population, and later was called Seso by the Romans after their conquest. In the Middle Ages it was owned by the Dukes of Biandrate and, in the 17th century, by Spain.

== Main sights ==
- Sanctuary of Sant'Anna, an example of Sacro Monte
- Parish church of Sts. Peter and Paul
- Archaeological and Paleontological Museum "Carlo Conti"
- Natural Park of Monte Fenera
