= Arbogna Valley =

Valley in Italy

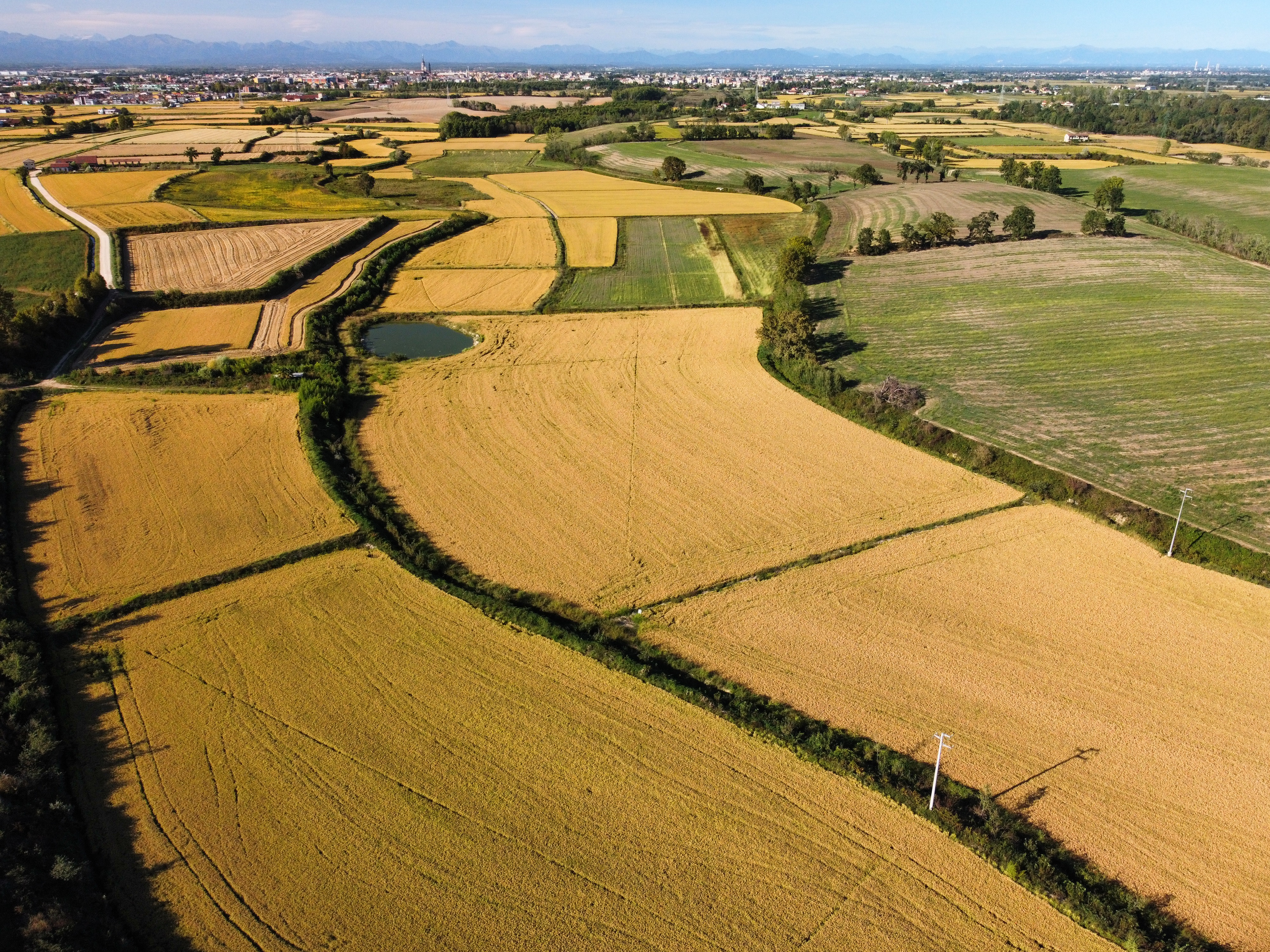
- The valley on the border between the municipalities of Novara and Garbagna Novarese

Naming
- Native name: Valle dell'Arbogna (Italian)

Geography
- Country: Italy
- State/Province: Piedmont
- District: Novara (municipalities of Novara, Garbagna Novarese, Nibbiola, Vespolate)
- River: Arbogna
- Interactive map of Arbogna Valley

The Arbogna Valley is a small valley formed by the stream of the same name and located on the Novara-Vespolate fluvial-glacial terrace.

The area is a popular birdwatching destination (see Fauna section) and is entirely within the Parco della Battaglia della Bicocca (Battle of Bicocca Park).

== Geography ==
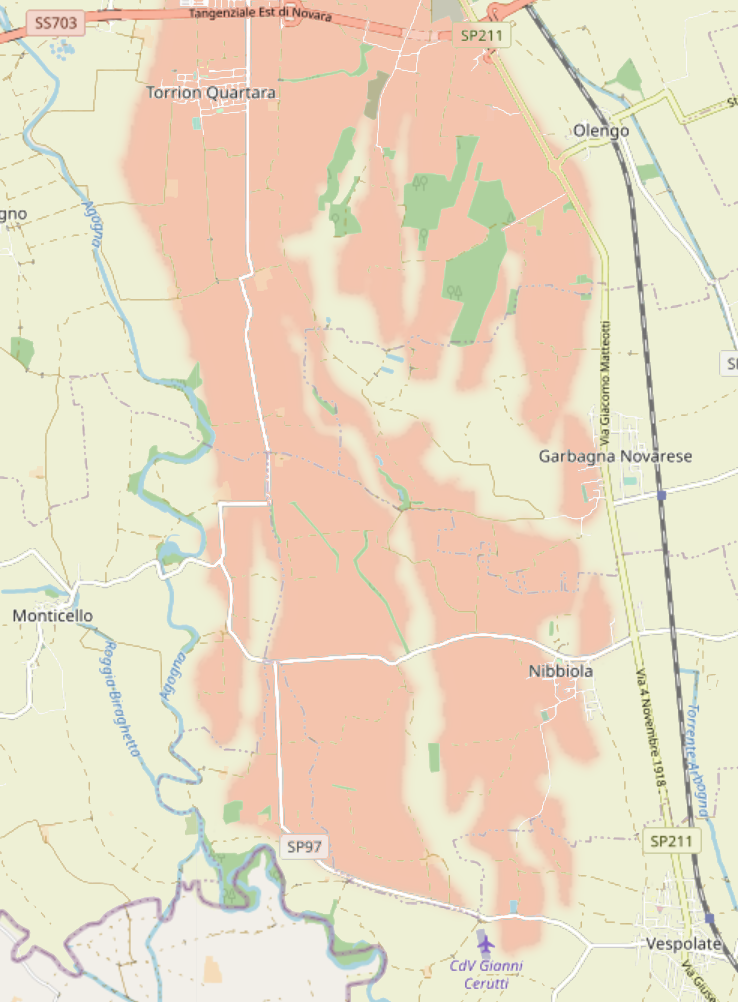
Arbogna Valley within the Novara-Vespolate Terrace: the valley corresponds to the gap in the central-eastern part

The valley begins near Piazza d'Armi, in the Bicocca district; from the Novara ring road, you can see the first hills sloping down towards the stream, which is still a small stream.

A few kilometers south, precisely in the municipality of Garbagna Novarese, the valley begins to "dissolve", leaving only the aforementioned fluvial-glacial terrace.

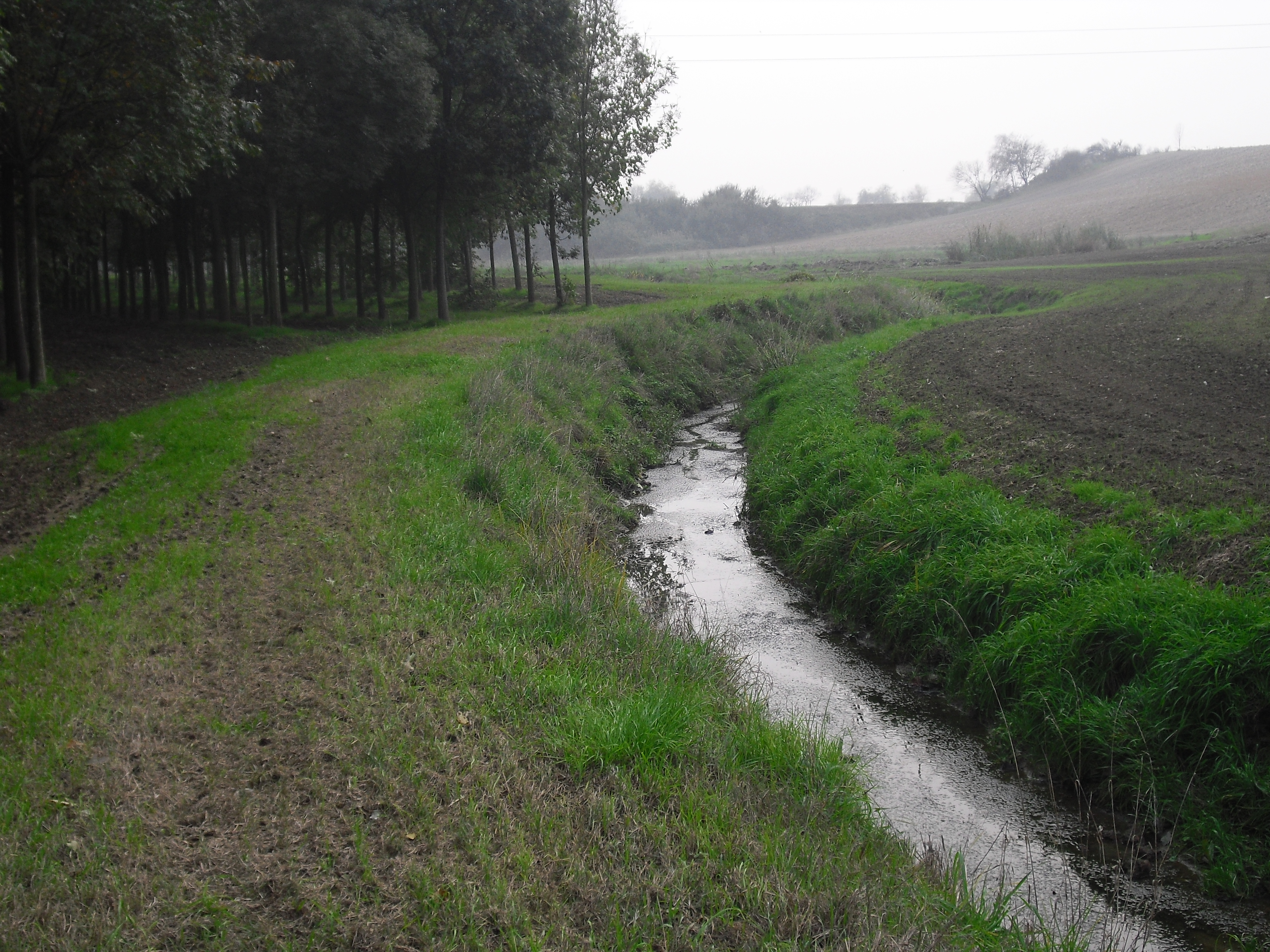
Arbogna stream at the beginning of its course (east of Torrion Quartara)

In addition to Arbogna, the valley is crossed by many small streams.

== Origin ==
The valley was created by the erosive action of the Arbogna stream on the sediments of the Novara-Vespolate Terrace, which in turn dates back to the first glaciation.

== History and places of interest ==
In the Middle Ages, the valley was part of an area known as baraggia (or barazia), a term that referred to the compact, clayey terrain that extended south of Novara's walls. Its northern section was bordered to the west by the village of San Gaudenzio, and to the east by the relief of San Nazzaro (site of the Abbey of San Nazzaro della Costa), continuing southward at least to Bicocca and the village of Olengo.

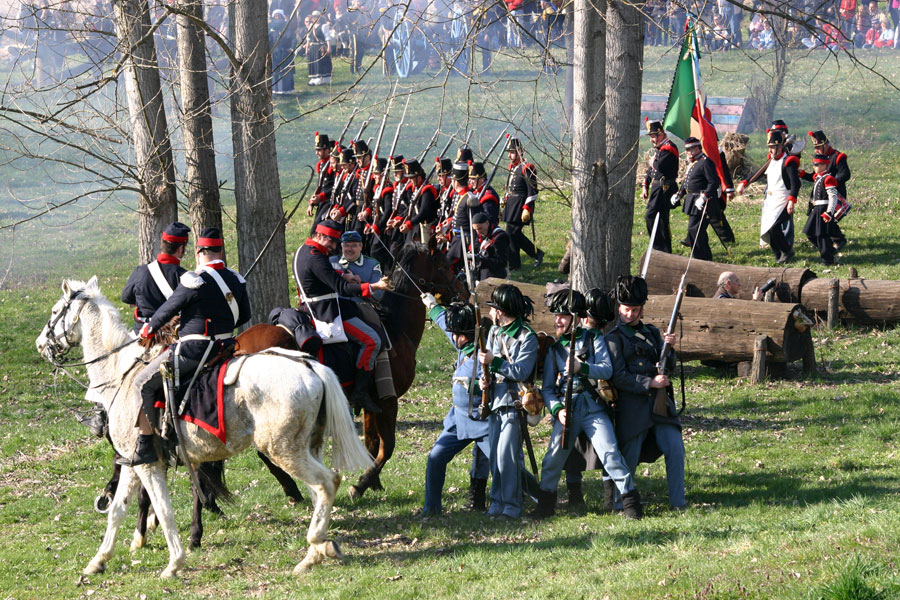
The reenactment of the historic Battle of Bicocca (or of Novara)

Among the places of historical interest in the valley are the farmsteads, many of which date back to the 15th century, with the current structures dating from the 18th to the 20th century.

The Battle of Bicocca was fought in the valley in 1849.

Until the late 1970s, the main valley floor was a swamp of considerable size. Subsequent valley floor leveling and agricultural reclamation projects have transformed it into rice paddies, nestled within them, some uncultivable ponds.

Both in the marshes and in the rice fields, the phenomenon of funghìn (a popular term for quicksand) could be observed: in shallow, clear water, when the surface water was absorbed by the ground and came into contact with the groundwater, the clay was diluted to the point of being neither liquid nor solid. The danger was mainly linked to working animals (horses and oxen) and heavy vehicles, which were difficult to extract from it.

=== Parco della Battaglia ===
At the initiative of local historian Angelo Luigi Stoppa, a committee was formed in 1989 to establish the Parco della Battaglia (Battle Park), to protect the area of the 1849 battle from a historical, landscape, architectural, and naturalistic perspective. The protection included the farmsteads at the center of the battle, the characteristic glacial clay hills and slopes of the Arbogna Valley (which is entirely within it), its flora and fauna, and all aspects of rural life at that time. The proposal was accepted by the Piedmont Region, which in 1992 placed a historical and landscape protection restriction on the area bounded by the Agogna river to the west, the Novara-Alessandria railway to the east, Piazza d'Armi to the north, and the municipal boundaries to the south.

== Crops ==
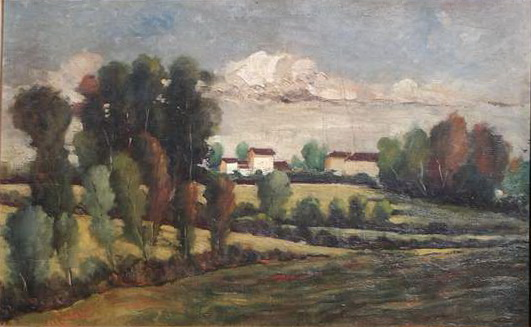
Arturo Conterno, Valle Arbogna, oil on panel

The crops grown in the valley are quite varied: rice in the valley floor, wheat, poplar groves and woods on the hills, together with corn, soybeans and barley.

== Fauna ==
Being a very diverse environment, the area hosts a wide variety of species.

Among the birdlife, the grey heron, the little egret and the great white egret are present; in the summer, the black-crowned night heron and the squacco heron can also be observed. The mallard, the lapwing and the pheasant are common, while during migration, various species of waders are frequent, such as the sandpiper. In winter, the poplar groves host roosting pigeons and in the woods there are numerous species of passerines, including the blackcap, present all year round, and the robin, observable in autumn and winter. Among the birds of prey, the sparrowhawk and the buzzard are common, the marsh harrier is frequent, while in winter it is possible to observe the hen harrier.

The valley is also included in a repopulation and trapping zone extending over 1,500 hectares between the municipalities of Novara, Garbagna Novarese, Nibbiola, and Granozzo con Monticello. As of 2011, the area was deemed suitable for breeding, primarily hares and pheasants.

The presence of foxes and wild boars is also known. The latter, in particular, are responsible for the damage caused to crops and the risks posed to the transit of vehicles.

== Bibliography ==
- Ventura, Alberto; Ventura, Jacopo; Mussetta, Sara (20 April 2009). "Valutazione Ambientale Strategica (VAS) - Piano paesistico del terrazzo "Novara Vespolate" - Rapporto ambientale" (PDF). Provincia di Novara - Ufficio urbanistica e piano territoriale (in Italian).
- Conturbia, Franco (2022). "Solcati da una valle son quei colli". Novara è... (in Italian) (7). Novara: EMME distribuzione: 28–35.

=== Further information ===
- Ghibaudo, Martina; Oliveri, Giacomo (2023), Novara anfibia. Progetto di un parco nella valle del torrente Arbogna (in Italian), supervisors Carlo Ravagnati and Thomas Pepino, Politecnico di Torino, Corso di laurea magistrale in Architettura Costruzione Città
