= Novara-Vespolate Terrace =

Fluvioglacial terrace in Italy, province of Novara

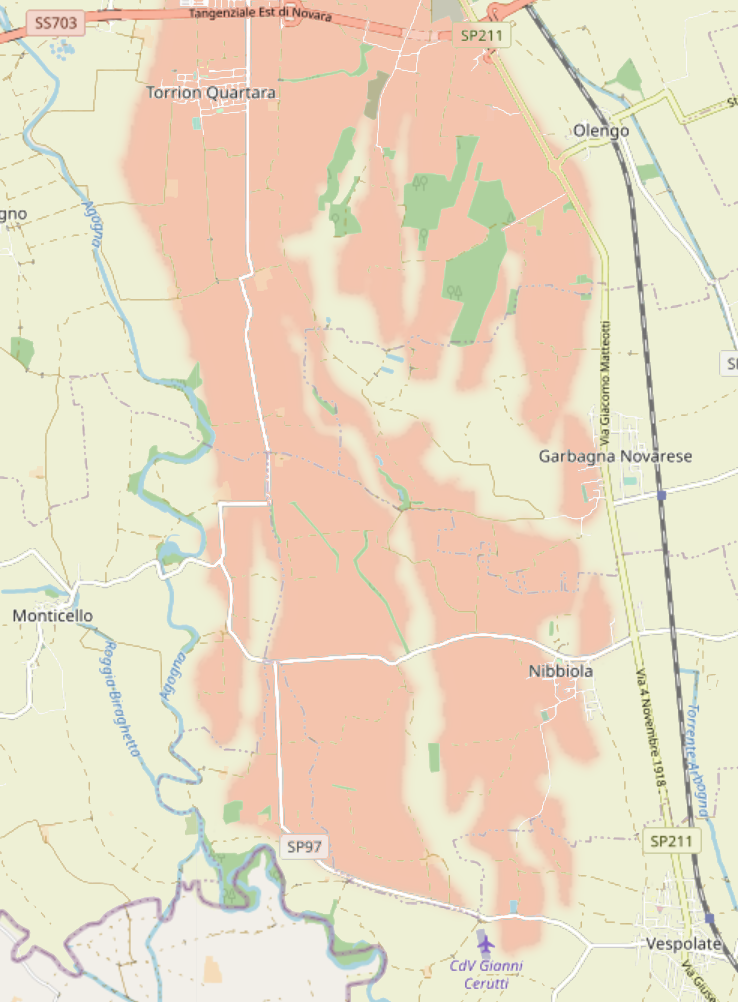
- The terrace reliefs (pink), south of Novara
- Interactive map of Novara-Vespolate Terrace
- Coordinates: 45.391938°N 8.640819°E
- Location: Province of Novara, Piedmont, Italy (municipalities of Novara, Garbagna Novarese, Granozzo con Monticello, Nibbiola and Vespolate)

Area
  - Total: 38.82 km^{2} (14.99 sq mi)
- Website: www.provincia.novara.it/Urbanistica/PPNoVesp.php

The Novara-Vespolate Terrace is an Italian fluvioglacial terrace, located in the municipalities of Novara, Garbagna Novarese, Granozzo con Monticello, Nibbiola, and Vespolate. It is bordered to the west by Agogna stream and to the east by the Novara-Mortara railway (part of the Alessandria–Novara–Arona line.

== Geomorphology ==
Geomorphologically, the area consists of a gravelly fluvioglacial alluvial terrace, which has been modified over time by leveling works to favor rice cultivation. The area is characterized by large open spaces, interrupted mainly by farmsteads and rural settlements. The area bordering the southern part of Novara is particularly affected by the construction of large infrastructures and facilities, such as the Novara ring road, the urban wastewater treatment plant, the high-voltage power line junction area, and the landfill site.

The altitude of the terrace slopes gently towards the south, with a maximum of 155 m a.s.l. near Via Piazza d'Armi in Novara and a minimum of 123 m a.s.l. at the southern edge in the municipality of Vespolate.

== Surface waters ==
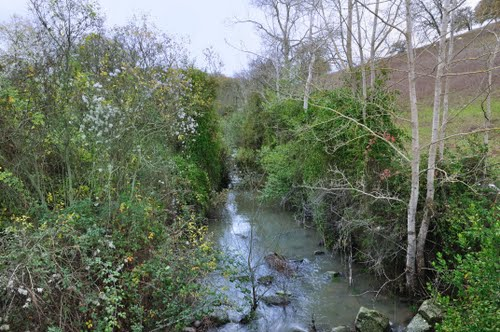
The Rì stream

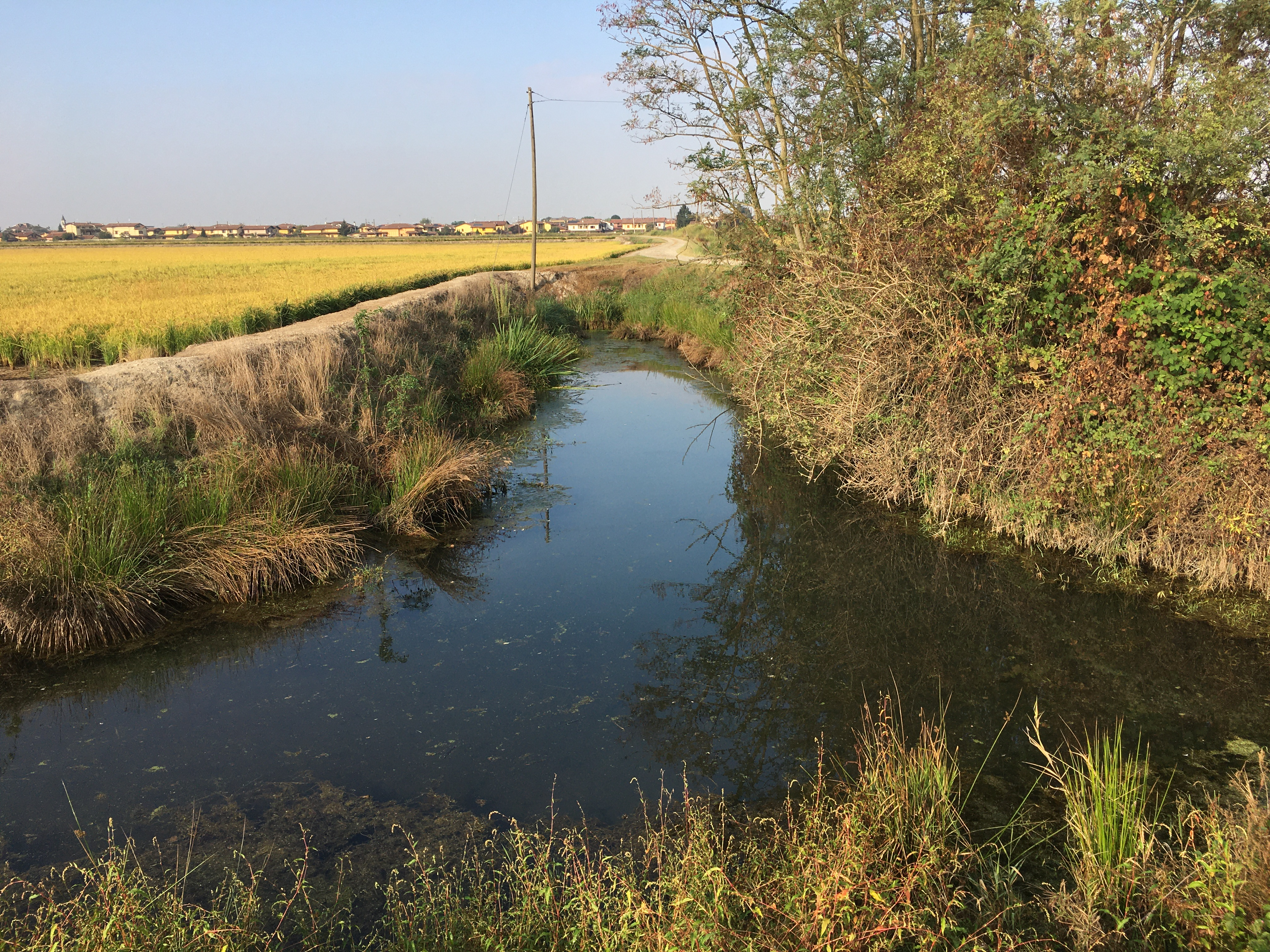
The Roggiola spring

The surface waters are essentially made up of Agogna and Arbogna streams and the network of artificial canals used for irrigation:

- Quintino Sella canal;
- Prina, Ricca, Cattedrale, Pozzo, Boggiani, Dessi, Boggiani, Rì and Germagnone streams;
- Olengo, S. Marta and Caccesca (or Cacesca) ditches;
- Roggiola spring.

== Geology ==
The nature of the soil consists solely of Quaternary continental deposits of fluvioglacial and fluvial nature:

- from recent and current glacio-fluvial and fluvial floods (Holocene);
- from glacio-fluvial floods of the Riss (Pleistocene);
- from glacio-fluvial and fluvial floods of the Würm (Late Pleistocene).

The deposits of recent and current fluvioglacial and fluvial floods are found only to the west of the town of Garbagna, where, being linked to floods, they are mainly made up of sandy-silty material.

The Rissian fluvioglacial alluvial deposits consist of yellowish gravels, sands, and silts; the upper surface layer consists of ochre-yellow clays. The Riss fluvioglacial deposit forms the Novara-Vespolate plateau and the two sub-flat plateaus of Garbagna and Nibbiola. In this area, the spring trend N-S starting from the base of the Rissian terrace, from Olengo to Vespolate, then turns NW-SE.

Around the Rissian terrace are the deposits of the Würmian alluvial deposits, formed by gravelly-pebbly fluvial-glacial and sandy-silty fluvial materials, respectively upstream and downstream of the spring line.

The transition from fluvioglacial to fluvial deposits corresponds to a decrease in the granulometry of the soil, consequently determining a lower permeability, thus favouring the surfacing of the aquifer.

== Hydrogeology ==
The terrace has two aquifer types:

- a shallow one with phreatic characteristics, used for irrigation and only marginally for industrial purposes, whose water flow is NW-SE;
- a semi-confined one, in communication with waters of the deep aquifer.

== History ==
The center of the terrace: the western part of Garbagna Novarese municipality

In the Middle Ages, it was known (at least the northern half) as baraggia (or barazia), a term that referred to the compact, clayey terrain that extended south of Novara's walls. Its northern section was bordered to the west by the village of San Gaudenzio, and to the east by the relief of San Nazzaro (site of the Abbey of San Nazzaro della Costa), continuing southward at least to Bicocca and the village of Olengo.

== Landscape plan ==
The landscape plan for the Novara-Vespolate terrace was approved by the Provincial Council of Novara in 2009, aimed at protecting and enhancing the landscape and historical heritage of this area.

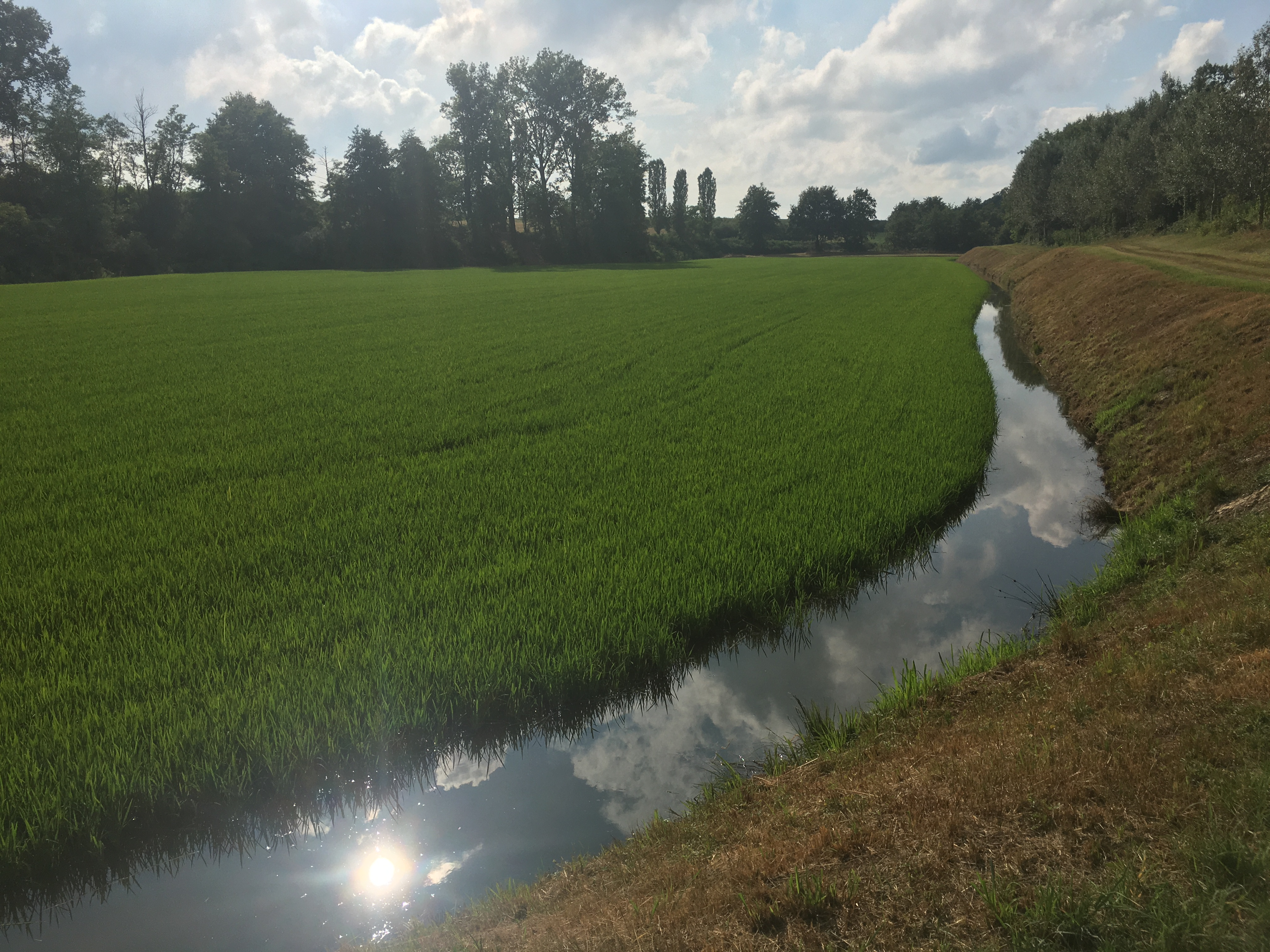
Rice field in Rì Valley, one of the many valleys within the terrace

The activities identified by the plan include:

- restoration of territorial landmarks, such as hedges and trees along the banks or edges of fields;
- maintenance of water sources;
- judicious crop diversification;
- for the main routes, provision of rest areas and facilities for enjoying the most important landscape features;
- for secondary routes, mostly accessible via rural roads, application of restrictions on motorized vehicles.

== See also ==
- Arbogna Valley

== Bibliography ==
- Ventura, Alberto; Ventura, Jacopo; Mussetta, Sara (20 April 2009). "Valutazione Ambientale Strategica (VAS) - Piano paesistico del terrazzo "Novara Vespolate" - Rapporto ambientale" (PDF). Provincia di Novara - Ufficio urbanistica e piano territoriale (in Italian).
