= Vinzaglio =

- Comune
- Comune di Vinzaglio
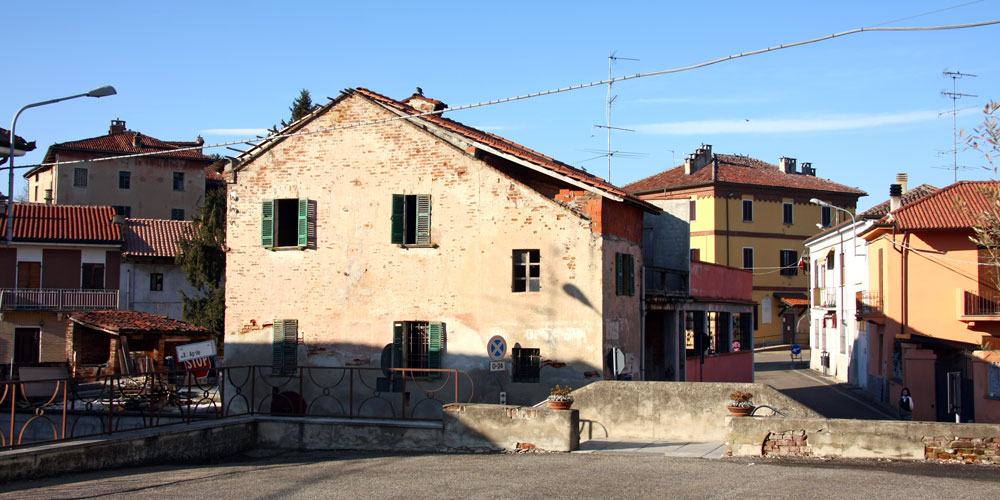
- View of Vinzaglio

- Coat of arms

- Location within Italy Location within Piedmont
- Coordinates: 45°19′N 8°31′E
- Country: Italy
- Region: Piedmont
- Province: Novara (NO)

Government
  - Mayor: Giuseppe Olivero

Area
  - Total: 15.5 km^{2} (6.0 sq mi)

Population (Dec. 2004)
  - Total: 612
  - Density: 39.5/km^{2} (102/sq mi)
- Demonym: Vinzagliesi
- Time zone: UTC+1 (CET)
  - Summer (DST): UTC+2 (CEST)
- Postal code: 28060
- Dialing code: 0161
- Website: Official website

Vinzaglio is a comune (municipality) in the Province of Novara in the Italian region Piedmont, located about 70 kilometres (43 mi) northeast of Turin and about 15 kilometres (9 mi) southwest of Novara. It is an agricultural borough in the rice-growing plain of Vercelli.

Vinzaglio borders the following municipalities: Borgo Vercelli, Casalino, Confienza, Palestro and Vercelli. The Battle of Palestro was fought near the town on 30–31 May 1859.
