= Casalino =

- Comune
- Comune di Casalino
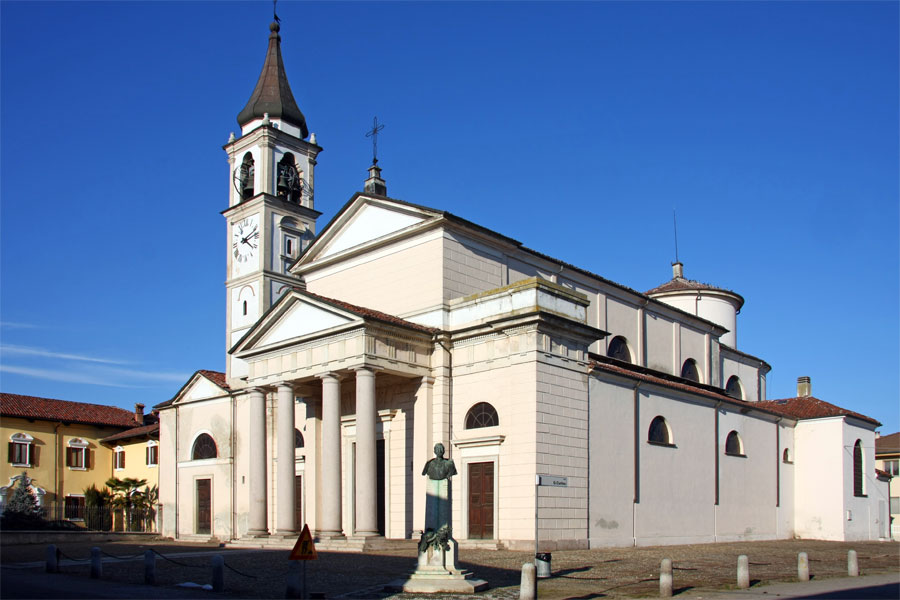
- Parish church, Casalino

- Location within Italy Location within Piedmont
- Coordinates: 45°22′N 8°32′E
- Country: Italy
- Region: Piedmont
- Province: Province of Novara (NO)

Area
  - Total: 39.6 km^{2} (15.3 sq mi)

Population (Dec. 2004)
  - Total: 1,469
  - Density: 37.1/km^{2} (96.1/sq mi)
- Time zone: UTC+1 (CET)
  - Summer (DST): UTC+2 (CEST)
- Postal code: 28060
- Dialing code: 0321

Casalino is a comune (municipality) in the Province of Novara in the Italian region Piedmont, located about 70 kilometres (43 mi) northeast of Turin and about 11 kilometres (7 mi) southwest of Novara. As of 31 December 2004, it had a population of 1,469 and an area of 39.6 square kilometres (15.3 mi^{2}).

Casalino borders the following municipalities: Biandrate, Borgo Vercelli, Casalbeltrame, Casalvolone, Confienza, Granozzo con Monticello, Novara, San Pietro Mosezzo, and Vinzaglio.

== Curiosity ==
In the municipality of Casalino, in the Cameriano area and nearby, the movie Rice Girl (Italian title La risaia) by Raffaello Matarazzo was shot. (Info by the Dizionario del Turismo Cinematografico)

== Demographic evolution ==
Historical population

Year	Pop.	±%
1861	3,041	—
1871	3,325	+9.3%
1881	3,541	+6.5%
1901	4,051	+14.4%
1911	3,826	−5.6%

Year	Pop.	±%
1921	3,512	−8.2%
1931	3,060	−12.9%
1936	3,319	+8.5%
1951	3,142	−5.3%
1961	2,749	−12.5%

Year	Pop.	±%
1971	1,888	−31.3%
1981	1,522	−19.4%
1991	1,504	−1.2%
2001	1,456	−3.2%

Source: Data from ISTAT
