= Albano Vercellese =

- Comune
- Comune di Albano Vercellese
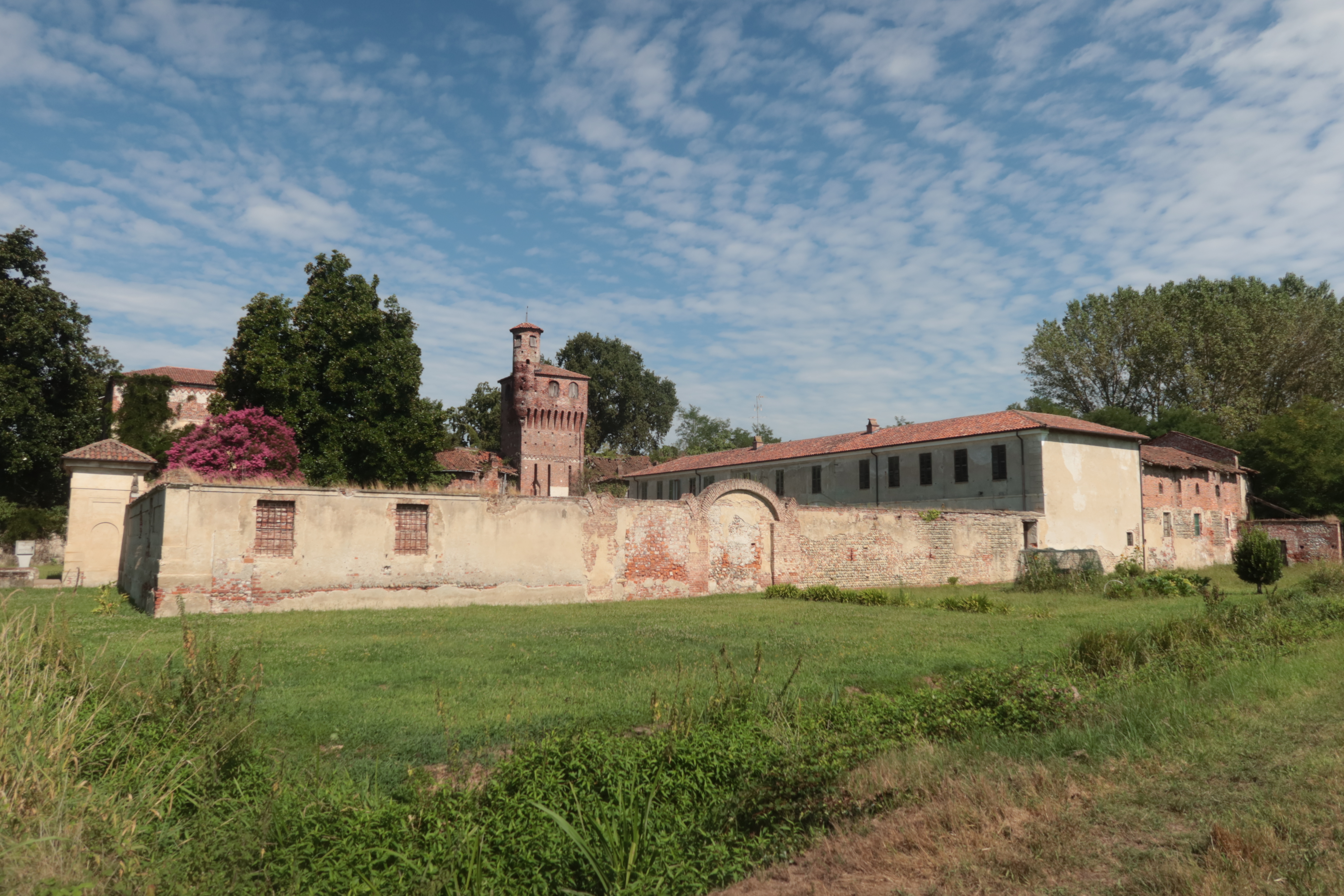
- Castle of Albano Vercellese

- Coat of arms

- Location of Albano Vercellese in Italy Albano Vercellese (Piedmont)
- Coordinates: 45°26′N 8°23′E
- Country: Italy
- Region: Piedmont
- Province: Vercelli (VC)

Government
  - Mayor: Massimiliano Barattini

Area
  - Total: 13.78 km^{2} (5.32 sq mi)
- Elevation: 151 m (495 ft)

Population (Dec. 2004)
  - Total: 330
  - Density: 24/km^{2} (62/sq mi)
- Demonym: Albanesi
- Time zone: UTC+1 (CET)
  - Summer (DST): UTC+2 (CEST)
- Postal code: 13030
- Dialing code: 0161
- Website: Official website

Albano Vercellese is a comune (municipality) in the Province of Vercelli in the Italian region Piedmont, located about 70 kilometres (43 mi) northeast of Turin and about 13 kilometres (8 mi) north of Vercelli.

Despite the Roman toponym, Albano is documented only from the 10th century. In 1335 it became a fief of the Visconti of Milan. It became part of the Duchy of Savoy in 1407.

Albano Vercellese borders the following municipalities: Collobiano, Greggio, Oldenico, San Nazzaro Sesia, and Villarboit. It is home to a castle which has maintained parts from the 14th century. The apse of the Oratory of the Holy Trinity has 15th-century frescoes.
