= Confienza =

- Comune
- Comune di Confienza
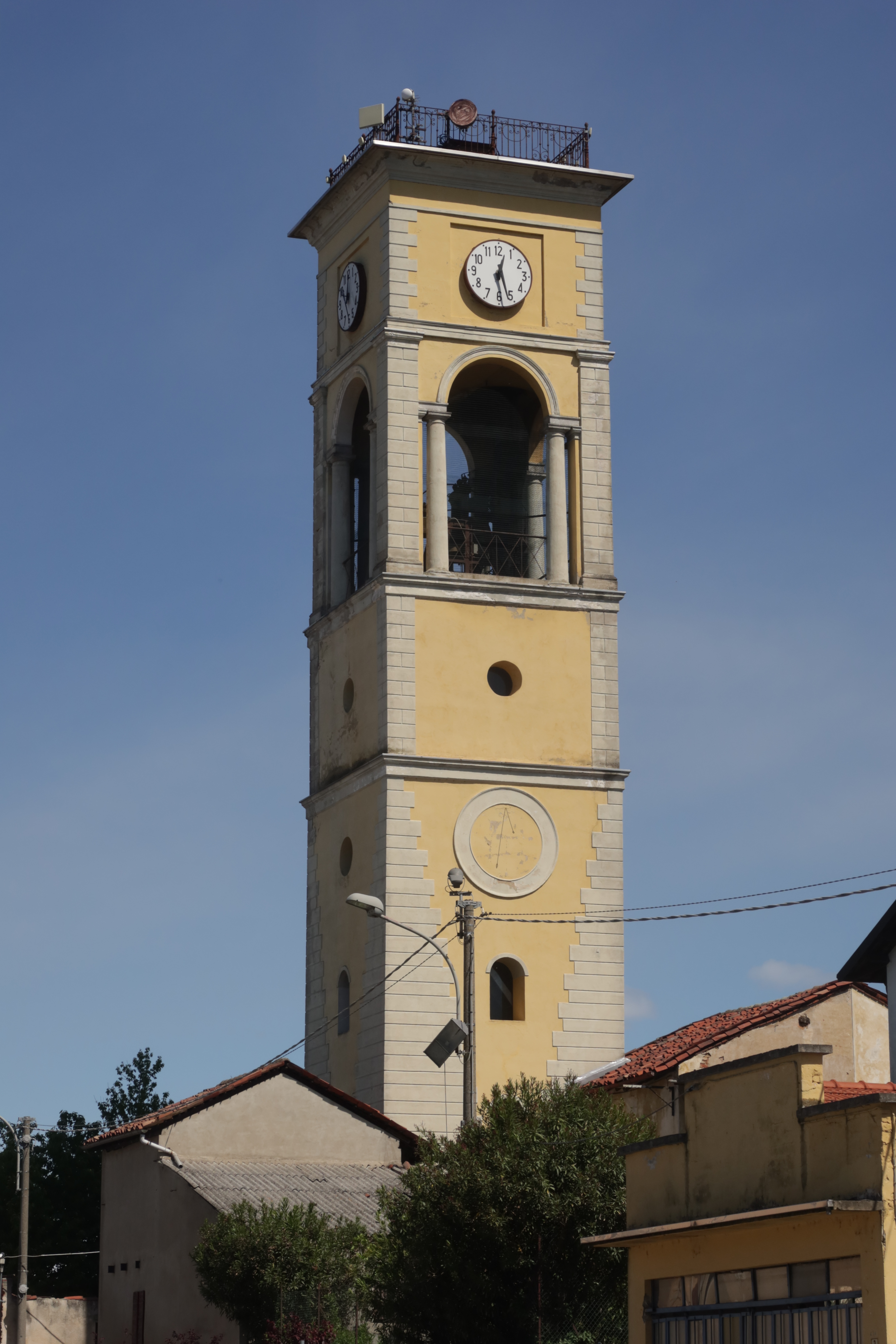

- Coat of arms

- Location within Italy Location within Lombardy
- Coordinates: 45°18′N 8°32′E
- Country: Italy
- Region: Lombardy
- Province: Pavia (PV)

Government
  - Mayor: Michele Zanotti Fragonara

Area
  - Total: 26.7 km^{2} (10.3 sq mi)

Population (2009)
  - Total: 1,704
  - Density: 63.8/km^{2} (165/sq mi)
- Demonym(s): Confienzesi, Confienzini or Confientini
- Time zone: UTC+1 (CET)
  - Summer (DST): UTC+2 (CEST)
- Postal code: 27030
- Dialing code: 0384
- Patron saint: St. Lawrence
- Saint day: 10 August
- Website: Official website

Confienza is a comune (municipality) in the Province of Pavia in the Italian region Lombardy, located about 50 km southwest of Milan and about 50 km northwest of Pavia.

Confienza borders the following municipalities: Casalino, Granozzo con Monticello, Palestro, Robbio, Vespolate, Vinzaglio.

== History ==
Confienza's name derives most likely from the Latin confluentia, referring to a confluence of two rivers which have now changed their course. It belonged to the bishop of Vercelli from 999, then to the lords of the nearby Robbio. Pavia obtained it through the intervention of emperor Frederick II. Later it was under the Visconti (who gave it as a fief to Alberico da Barbiano together with Belgioioso) and the Sforza of Milan. Under the French domination of the Duchy of Milan, it was held by Gian Giacomo Trivulzio. Later it was returned to the Barbiano of Belgioso, to which it belonged until 1797.
