= Via Palestro, Ivrea =

Street in Ivrea, Italy

Via Palestro
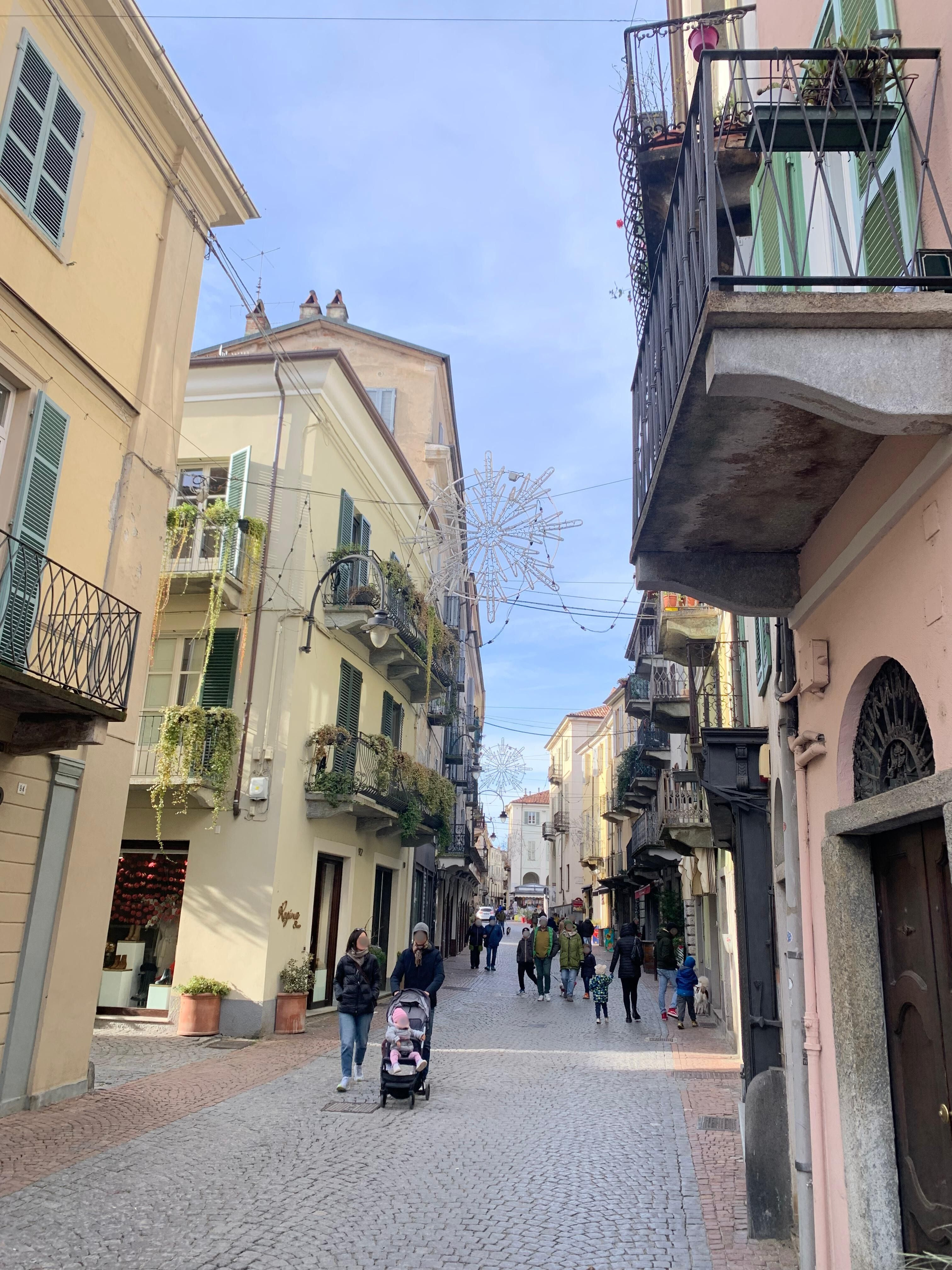
- Interactive map of Via Palestro
- Former names: Via Magna Burgi, Rue de Marengo
- Namesake: Battle of Palestro
- Type: Public
- Location: Ivrea, Italy
- Postal code: 10015
- Coordinates: 45°28′01.32″N 7°52′39.69″E

Via Palestro is a street in the town of Ivrea, Italy.

== History ==
The layout of the street reflects that of the eastern section of the ancient decumanus maximus from the Roman era, during which Ivrea was known as Eporedia. In the Middle Ages, it was called Via Magna Burgi, serving as the main thoroughfare of the town. After the French occupation of Ivrea in 1798, the street was renamed Rue de Marengo after the site near Alessandria, where the French achieved a significant victory against the Austrians during the Battle of Marengo. A plaque bearing the Napoleonic street name was restored in 2024.

It was not until 1861 that the street adopted its current name, commemorating the Battle of Palestro, near Pavia, during the Second Italian War of Independence. In this battle, Victor Emmanuel II, leading the Piedmontese troops allied with the French, secured a victory over the Austrian forces.

== Description ==
The street, which is the main commercial destination in Ivrea, hosts numerous shops and establishments. It is mainly pedestrianised, with vehicle access restricted to residents only.

It extends longitudinally, connecting Piazza di Città to Porta Vercelli. Its natural continuation beyond Piazza di Città is Via Arduino, which corresponds to the remaining western section of the decumanus maximus from the Roman era.

Two squares open onto the northern side of the street: Piazza Pietro Ottinetti, the largest in Ivrea and home to the Garda Museum, and the smaller Piazzetta Santa Marta. In the section between these two squares, a side street leads to Piazza del Teatro, where the Teatro Giacosa stands. The Giuseppe Boaro cinema, one of the oldest in Italy, and the Church of San Salvatore are located on the southern side of the street.

== Gallery ==
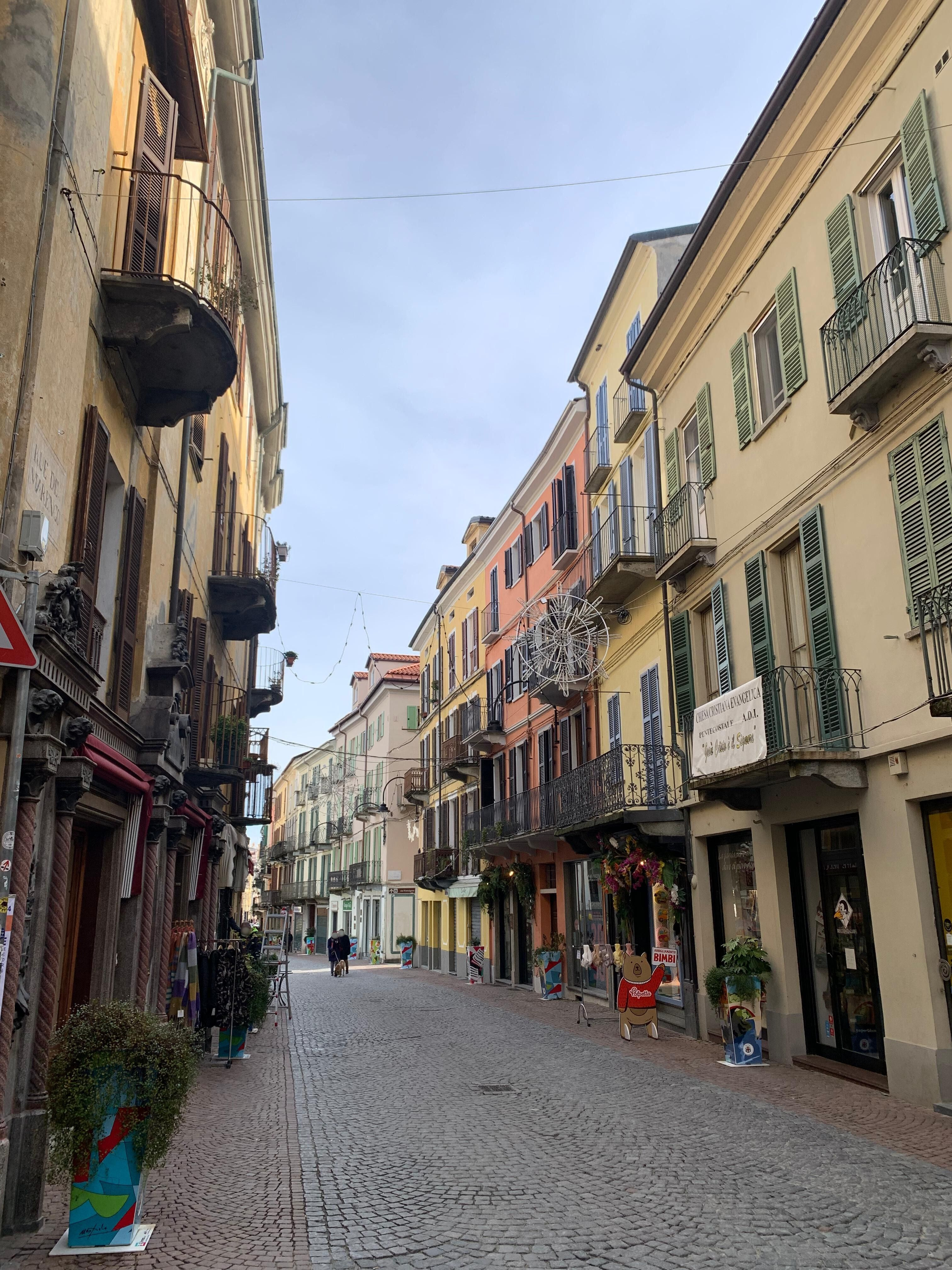

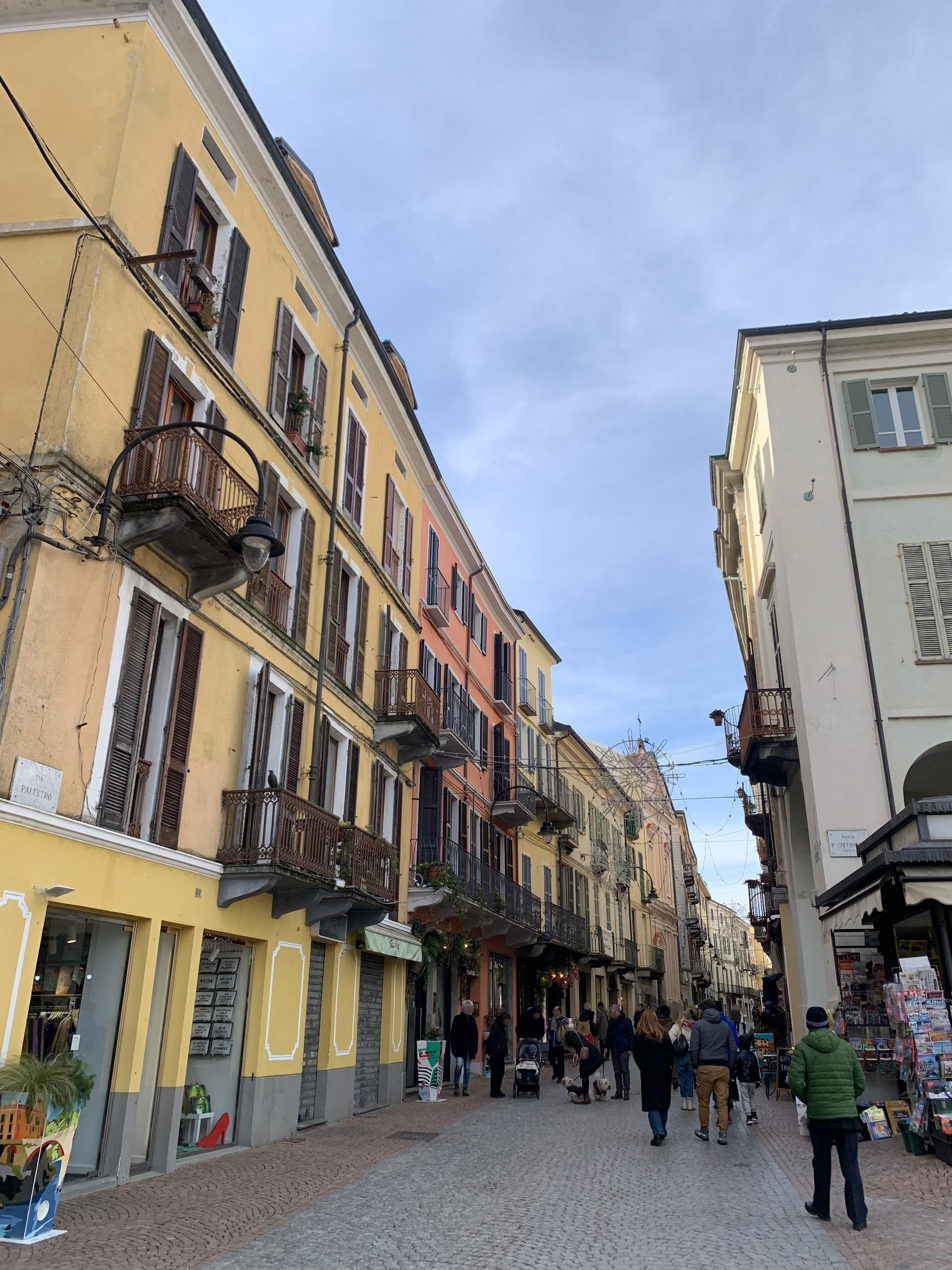

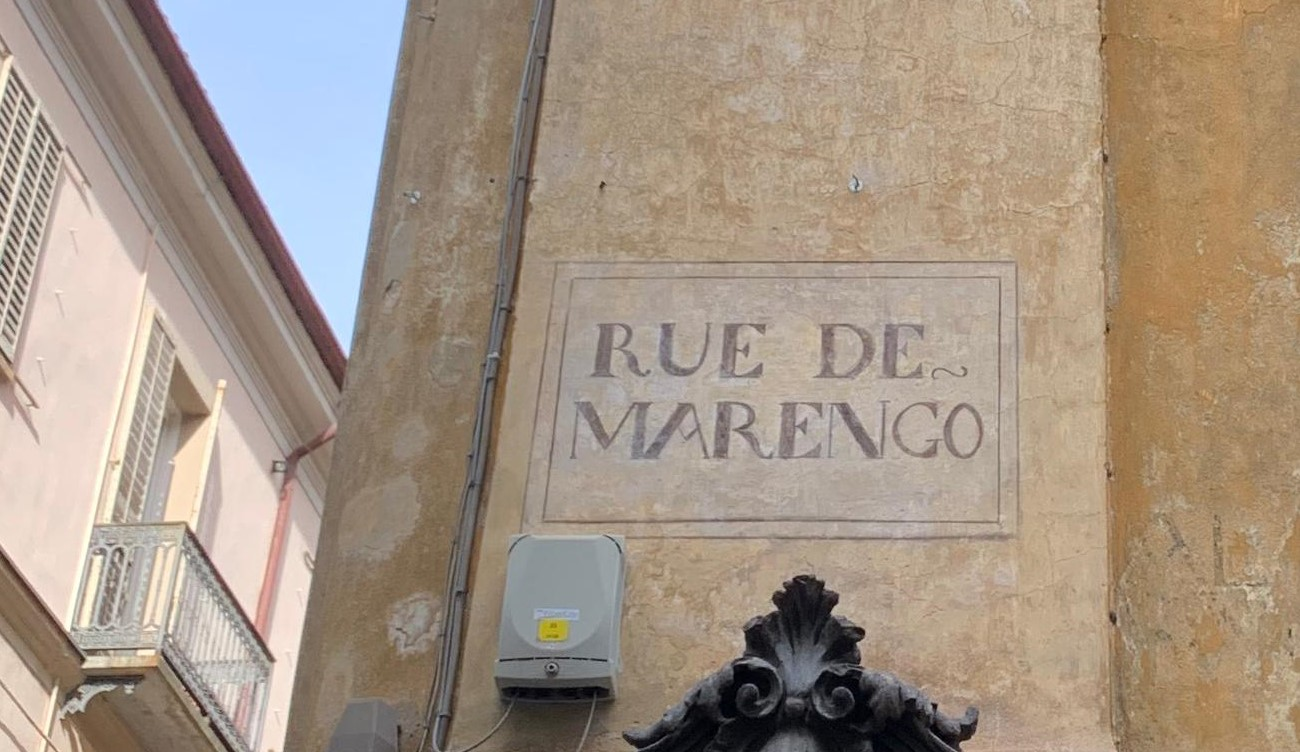
