= San Nazzaro Sesia =

- Comune
- Comune di San Nazzaro Sesia
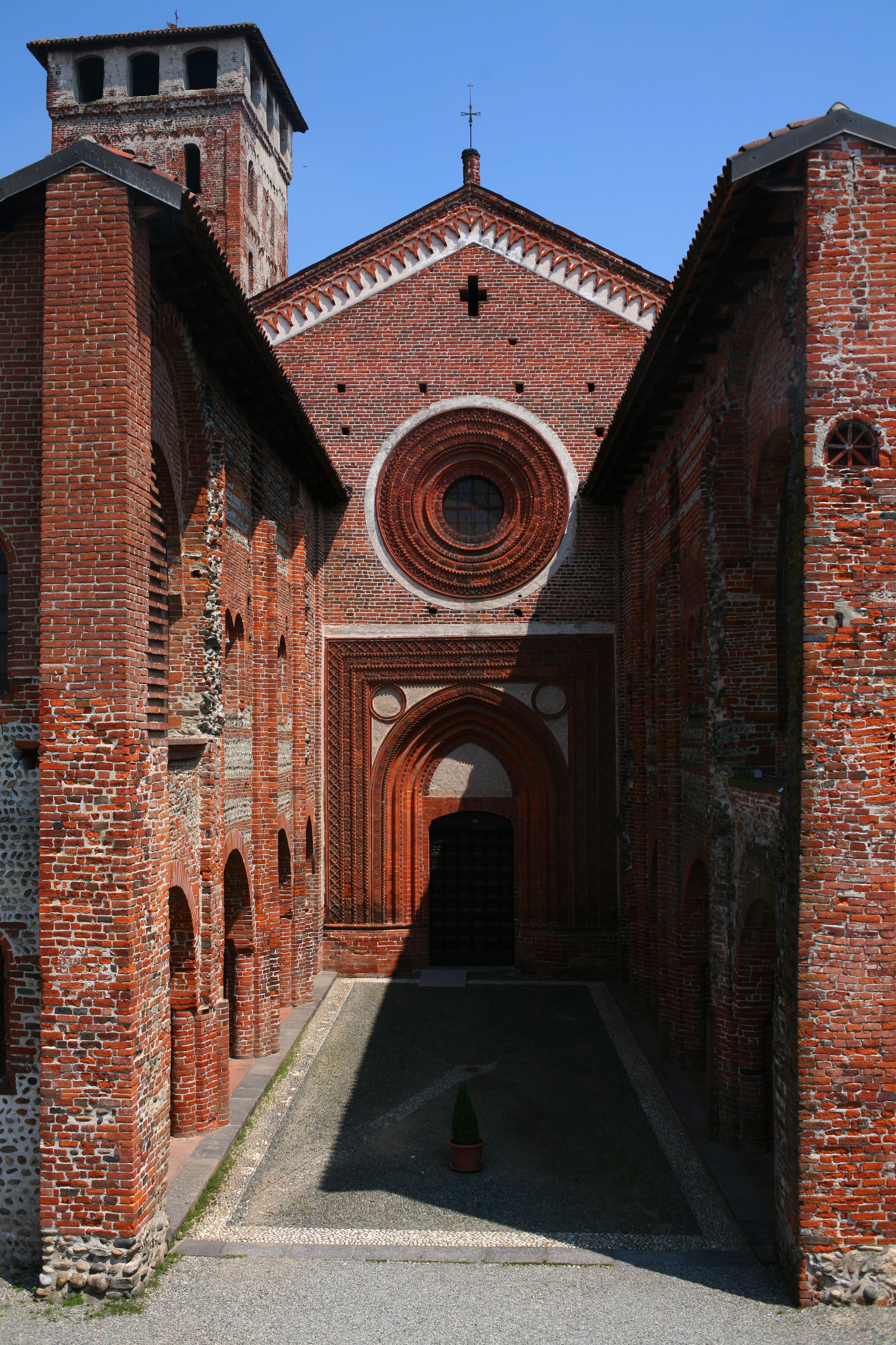
- View of San Nazzaro Sesia

- Coat of arms

- Location within Italy Location within Piedmont
- Coordinates: 45°26′N 8°25′E
- Country: Italy
- Region: Piedmont
- Province: Novara (NO)

Government
  - Mayor: Dario Delbò

Area
  - Total: 11.5 km^{2} (4.4 sq mi)
- Elevation: 153 m (502 ft)

Population (31 March 2009)
  - Total: 712
  - Density: 61.9/km^{2} (160/sq mi)
- Demonym: Sannazaresi
- Time zone: UTC+1 (CET)
  - Summer (DST): UTC+2 (CEST)
- Postal code: 28060
- Dialing code: 0321

San Nazzaro Sesia is a comune (municipality) in the Province of Novara in the Italian region Piedmont, located about 70 kilometres (43 mi) northeast of Turin and about 15 kilometres (9 mi) west of Novara.

San Nazzaro Sesia borders the following municipalities: Albano Vercellese, Biandrate, Casalbeltrame, Casalvolone, Greggio, Oldenico, Recetto, and Villata. It is home to the Abbey of San Nazzaro e Celso, one of the most important Romanesque complexes in Piedmont.

== Main sights ==
=== The Abbey of the Saints Nazarius and Celsus ===
The abbey is one of the most significant monastic complexes in Piedmont. It consists of a surrounding wall with circular corner towers, a tall Romanesque bell tower, a church in Lombard Gothic style, and an elegant cloister featuring a 15th-century cycle of frescoes depicting the stories of Saint Benedict.

=== Sanctuary of the Virgin Mary of the Fountain ===
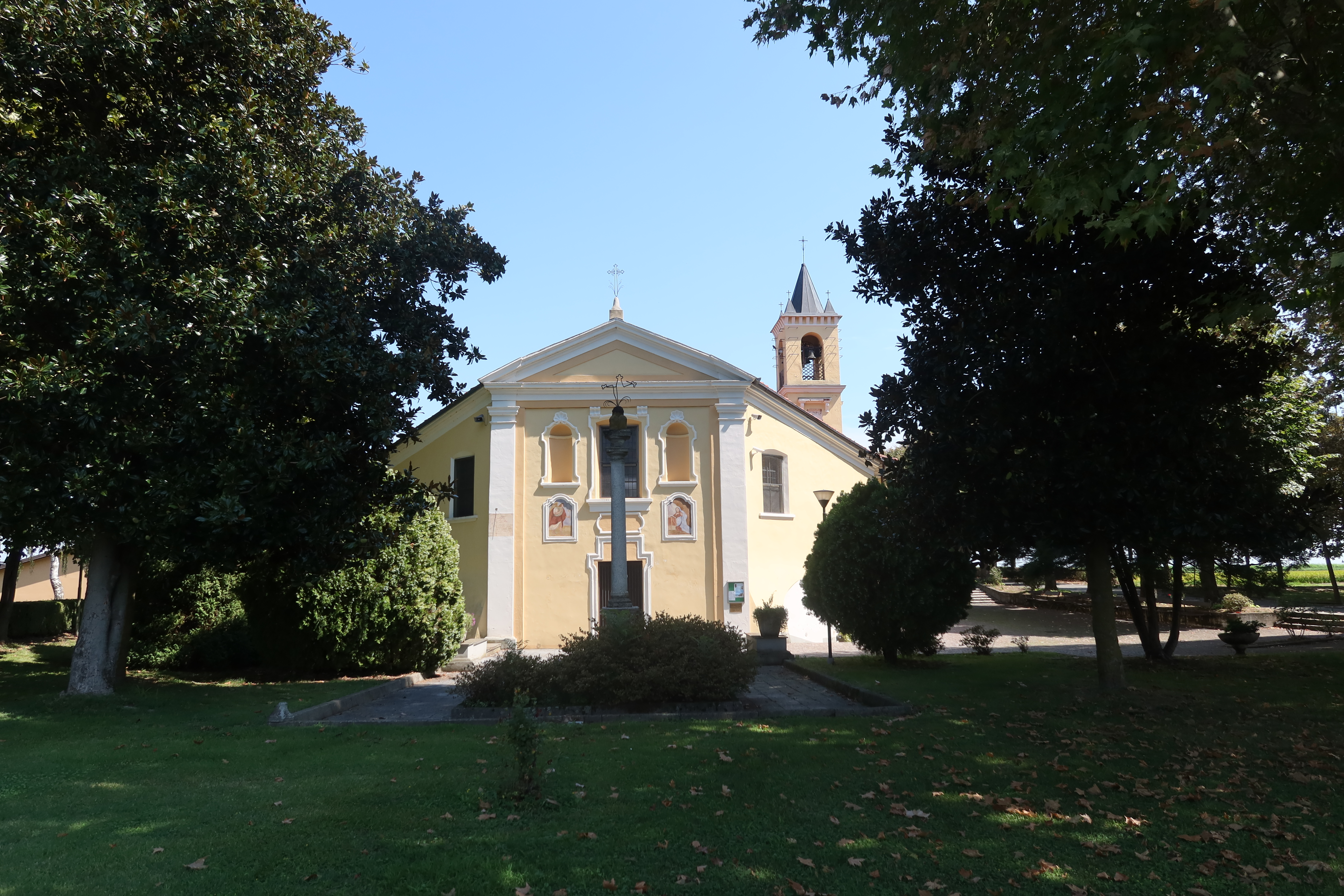

The Sanctuary, dating back to the 16th century, is located about 1.5 km from the town center, at the end of a long tree-lined avenue. It is still an active place of worship for many devotees and can be easily visited.

=== Ice house ===
Within the municipal territory, an ancient ice house is preserved. This semi-subterranean masonry structure was once used to collect and store natural ice, which was then provided during the summer to poor patients in need.

== Culture ==
=== Museums ===
- Museo dei Ceppi Piero Baudo.
