= Prarolo =

- Comune
- Comune di Prarolo
- Location within Italy Location within Piedmont
- Coordinates: 45°17′N 8°29′E
- Country: Italy
- Region: Piedmont
- Province: Province of Vercelli (VC)

Government
  - Mayor: Dario Caldera

Area
  - Total: 11.5 km^{2} (4.4 sq mi)

Population (Dec. 2004)
  - Total: 616
  - Density: 53.6/km^{2} (139/sq mi)
- Time zone: UTC+1 (CET)
  - Summer (DST): UTC+2 (CEST)
- Postal code: 13010
- Dialing code: 0161

Prarolo is a comune (municipality) in the Province of Vercelli in the Italian region Piedmont, located about 70 kilometres (43 mi) northeast of Turin and about 6 kilometres (4 mi) southeast of Vercelli. As of 31 December 2004, it had a population of 616 and an area of 11.5 square kilometres (4.4 mi^{2}).

Prarolo borders the following municipalities: Asigliano Vercellese, Palestro, Pezzana, and Vercelli.

== Demographic evolution ==
Historical population

Year	Pop.	±%
1861	1,513	—
1871	1,549	+2.4%
1881	1,571	+1.4%
1901	1,720	+9.5%
1911	1,490	−13.4%
1921	1,412	−5.2%

Year	Pop.	±%
1931	1,191	−15.7%
1936	1,130	−5.1%
1951	1,055	−6.6%
1961	887	−15.9%
1971	706	−20.4%
1981	621	−12.0%

Year	Pop.	±%
1991	585	−5.8%
2001	589	+0.7%
2011	672	+14.1%
2021	708	+5.4%

Source: Data from ISTAT
