= Greggio =

- Comune
- Comune di Greggio
- Coat of arms

- Location within Italy Location within Piedmont
- Coordinates: 45°27′N 8°23′E
- Country: Italy
- Region: Piedmont
- Province: Vercelli (VC)

Government
  - Mayor: Claudio Trada

Area
  - Total: 12.0 km^{2} (4.6 sq mi)
- Elevation: 161 m (528 ft)

Population (31 March 2009)
  - Total: 382
  - Density: 31.8/km^{2} (82.4/sq mi)
- Demonym: Greggesi
- Time zone: UTC+1 (CET)
  - Summer (DST): UTC+2 (CEST)
- Postal code: 13030
- Dialing code: 0161

Greggio is a comune (municipality) in the Province of Vercelli in the Italian region Piedmont, located about 70 kilometres (43 mi) northeast of Turin and about 15 kilometres (9 mi) north of Vercelli.

Greggio borders the following municipalities: Albano Vercellese, Arborio, Recetto, San Nazzaro Sesia, and Villarboit.
