= Friedrich Zobel =

Austrian military officer

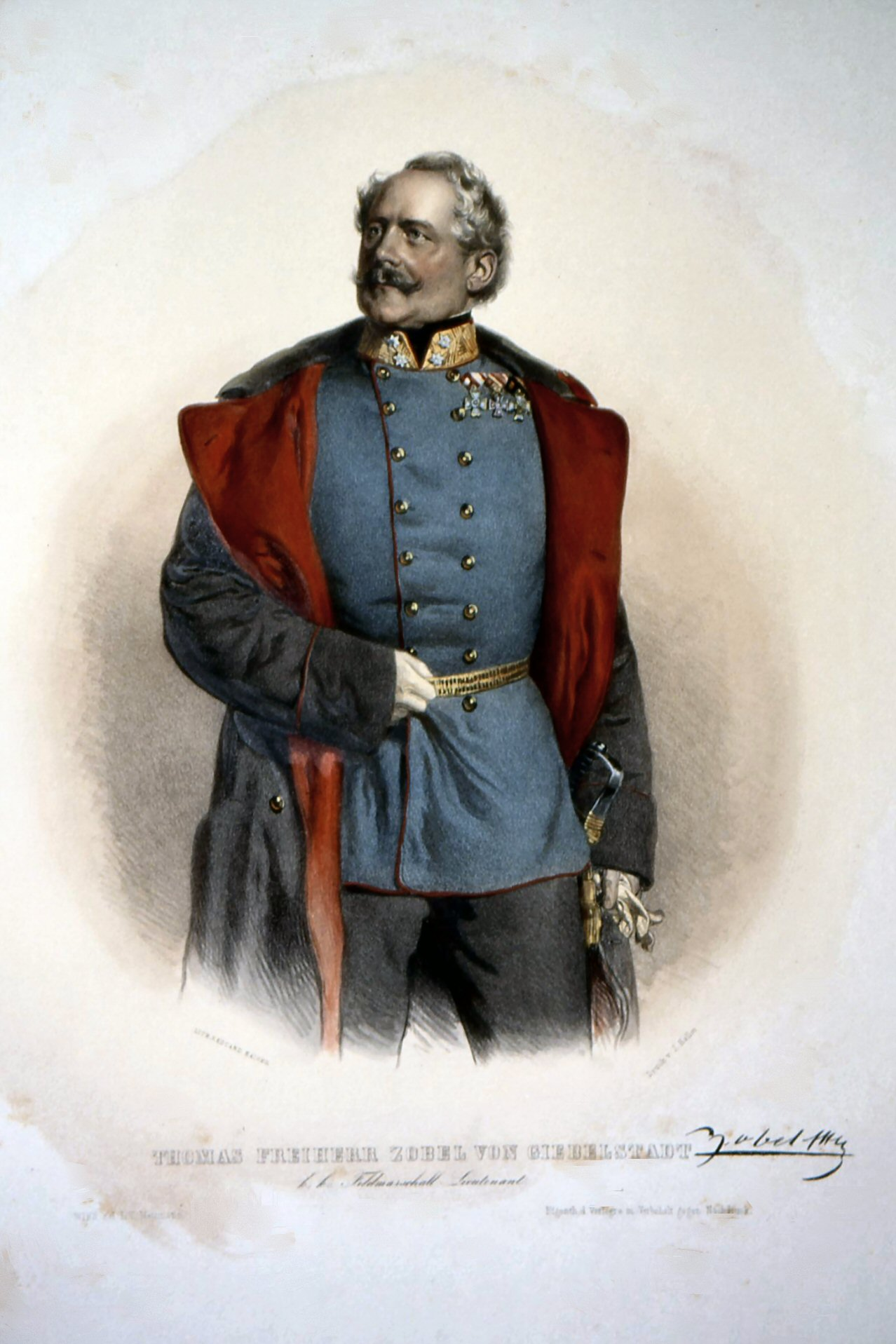
Friedrich Zobel

Thomas Friedrich Zobel von Giebelstadt und Darstadt (1799 – 12 July 1869) was an Austrian military officer.

Zobel was born into a family of the lesser Austrian nobility. He studied in the military academy of Vienna and distinguished himself in the riots in Lombardy-Venetia of 1848. On 30 April 1849 he was appointed Major General, becoming the governor of the fortress of Verona, where there was one of the largest Austrian garrisons in northern Italy.

On 12 May 1853 he was named a leutnant-feldmarschall in the Austrian army. He defended against the invasion of Lombardy-Venetia by a combined force from the Kingdom of Sardinia and Piedmont, and France, and fought in the battle of Palestro (1859, during the Italian Second War of Independence) as the Austrian commander, although the battle was lost. He retired from the military in 1864 and died in 1869.

== Bibliography ==
- Constantin von Wurzbach: "Zobel von Giebelstadt und Darstadt, Thomas Friedrich Freiherr." In: Biographisches Lexikon des Kaiserthums Oesterreich (Biographical Lexicon of the Empire of Austria). Part 60 Kaiserlich-königliche Hof- und Staatsdruckerei, Vienna 1891, p. 212 (digitalised).
