= Casalbeltrame =

- Comune
- Comune di Casalbeltrame
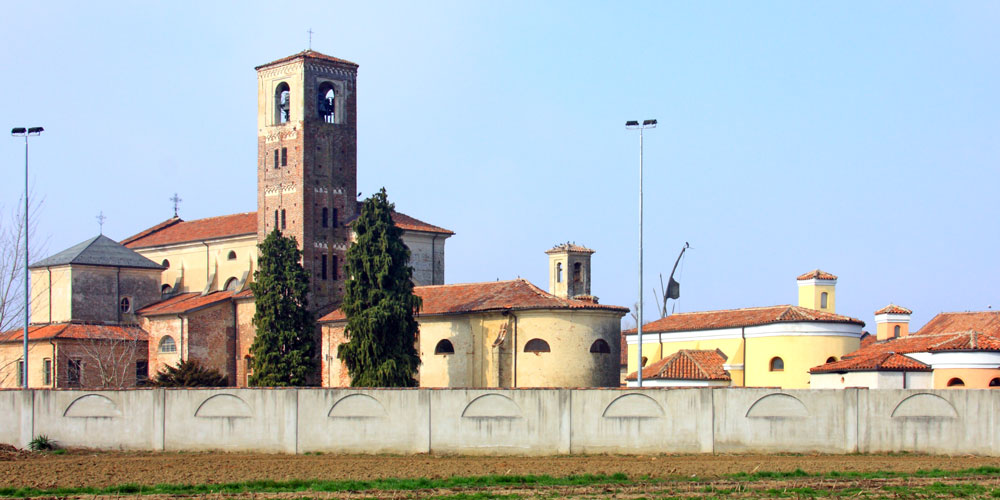
- View of Casalbeltrame

- Coat of arms

- Location within Italy Location within Piedmont
- Coordinates: 45°26′N 8°28′E
- Country: Italy
- Region: Piedmont
- Province: Novara (NO)

Government
  - Mayor: Claudia Porzio

Area
  - Total: 15.9 km^{2} (6.1 sq mi)
- Elevation: 148 m (486 ft)

Population (31 December 2010)
  - Total: 1,033
  - Density: 65.0/km^{2} (168/sq mi)
- Demonym: Casalbeltramesi
- Time zone: UTC+1 (CET)
  - Summer (DST): UTC+2 (CEST)
- Postal code: 28060
- Dialing code: 0321
- Patron saint: St. Novello
- Website: Official website

Casalbeltrame (Casabaltram in Piedmontese and Lombard) is an Italian town of 962 inhabitants in the province of Novara in Piedmont.

A part of the municipal territory is included in the Natural Park of the Lame del Sesia.

The rice paddies of Casalbeltrame are known for the production of riso venere, an unusual black rice of Chinese origins. Venere refers to Venus, the goddess of love, and to the aphrodisiac properties claimed for the rice. The variety is included in the Slow Food Atlas.

Casalbeltrame borders the following municipalities: Biandrate, Casalino, Casalvolone, and San Nazzaro Sesia.

Casalbeltrame is a member of Cittaslow.

== Transport infrastructure ==
Between 1884 and 1933 the locality was served by a tram stop, Vercelli-Biandrate-Fara.
