= Abbey of San Nazzaro e Celso =

Abbey in San Nazzaro Sesia, Italy

Coordinates: 45.4376°N 8.4227°E

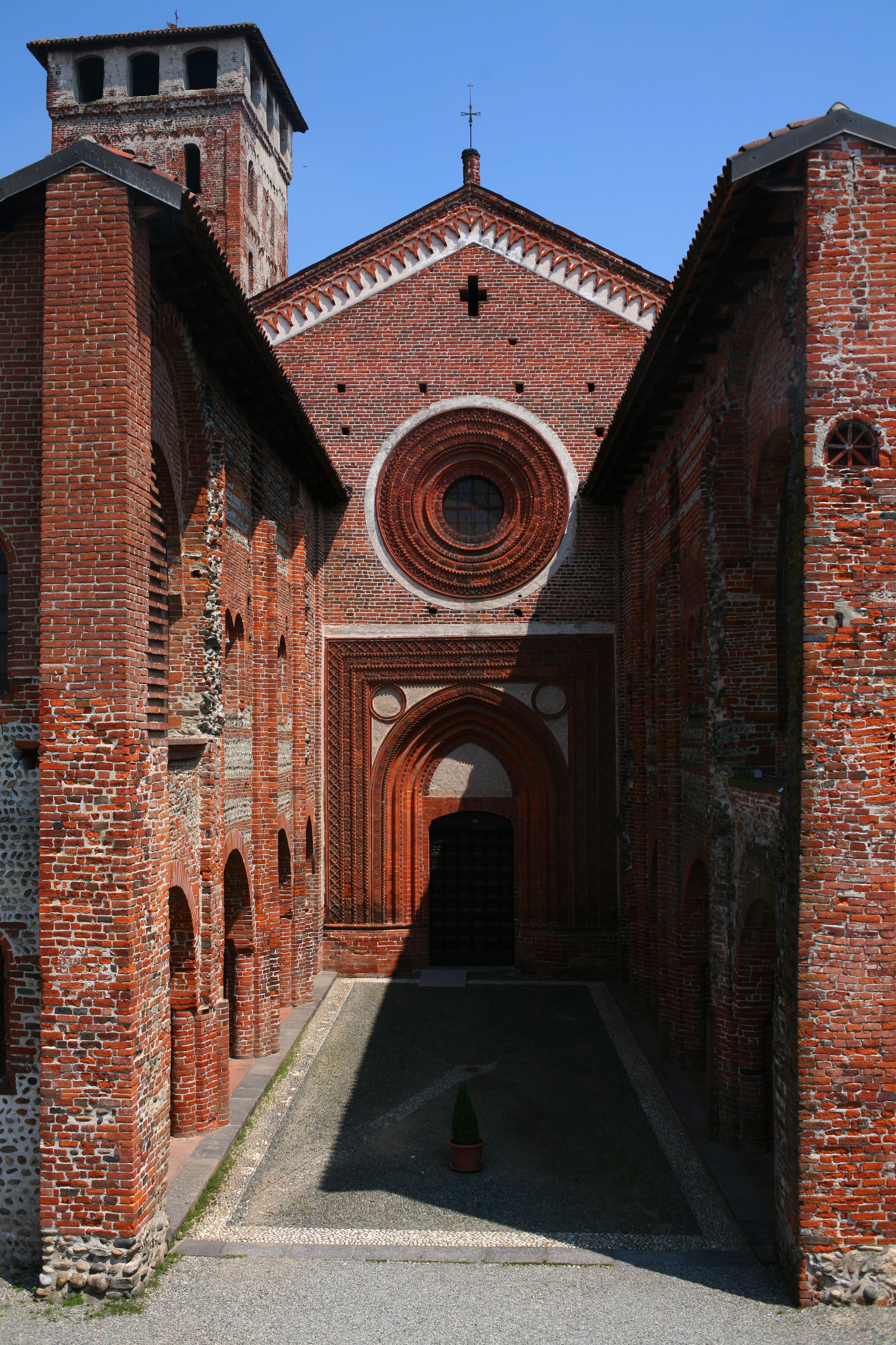
Façade of the abbey.

The Abbey of the Saints Nazario and Celso (Italian: Abbazia dei Santi Nazario e Celso) is a monastic complex in the municipality of San Nazzaro Sesia, Piedmont, northern Italy. It consists of a city wall with circular corner towers, a high Romanesque bell tower, a church in Lombard Gothic style and a cloister with a group of 15th-century frescoes dedicated to the stories of St. Benedict.

== History ==
The Abbey of San Nazzaro was built in 1040 near a ford on the Sesia river, likely the location of a pre-existing monastery dating from the Lombard period. His founder was Riprand, bishop of Novara, who assigned it to the Benedectines.

In the 13th century the abbey was fortified, including round towers, and surrounded with moats and walls, in order to work also as a shelter for the local population in case of invasion. The entrance was a large square tower with a drawbridge, no longer existing today. The abbey became a powerful local lordship, as the abbots were able to get free from both the communal and religious authorities of the area. The abbey owned a series of properties in the Vercelli, Novara, Valsesia and even Canavese areas.

After a period of decay, the abbey regained some importance starting from 1426, when a papal bull appointed Antonio Barbavara as abbot, who led it until 1466. Aside from restoring its economical power, Barbavara also had the church and cloister buildings restored in Lombard Gothic style.

After other periods of alternating wealth and poverty, in 1801 the abbey was finally sold to privates. It was restored in the 20th century.

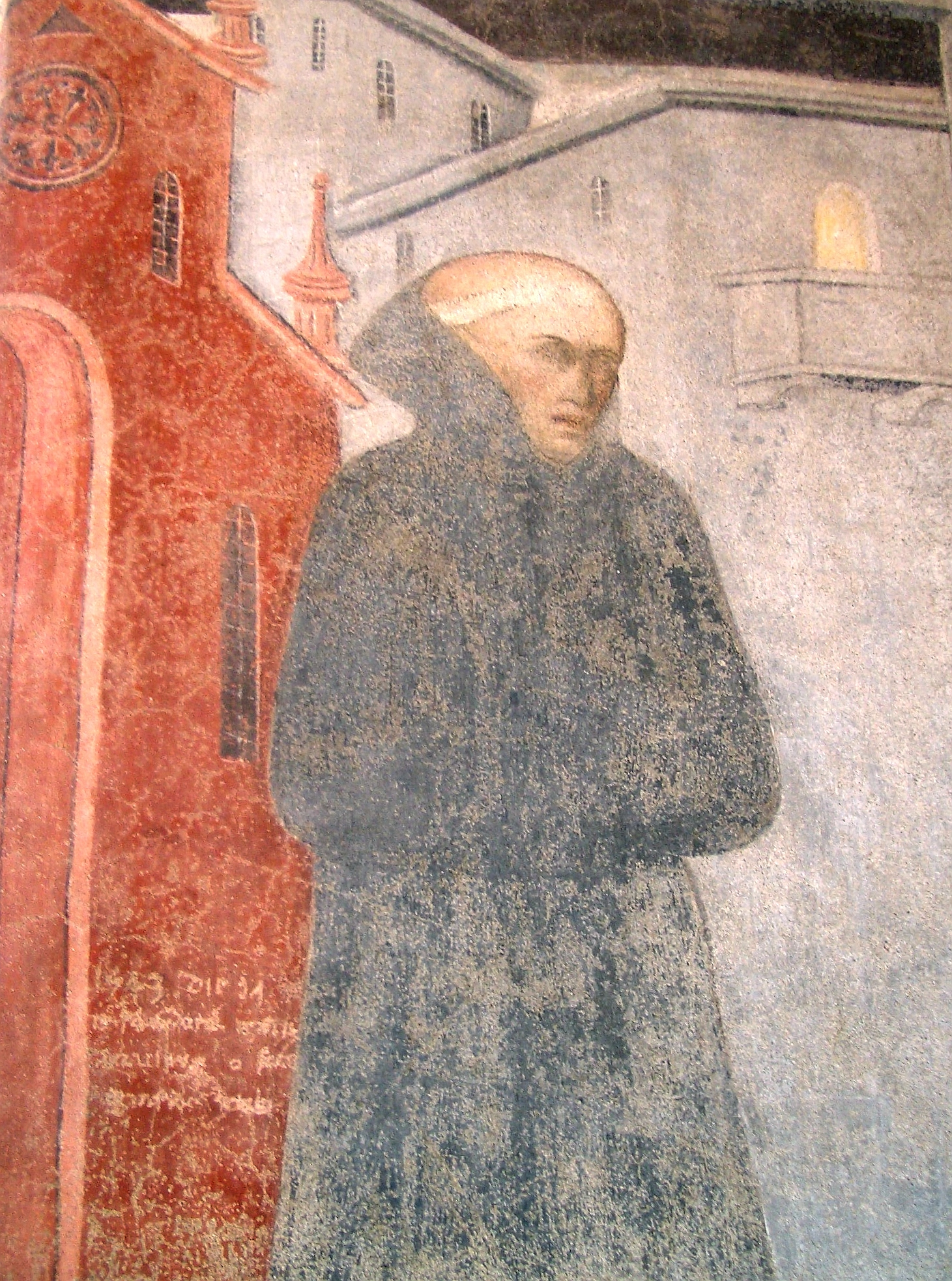
Depiction of a monk in the cloister frescoes.

== Description ==
The oldest element of the current building is the Romanesque bell tower, dating from 1055 to 1075. It has a square base with c. 8 m sides, and stands at 34.9 m; in case of war, it also acted as a watchtower.

The 15th century church has an external structure in brickworks with cotto decorations. The only original Romanesque elements still visible are the two portico-ed wings in correspondence of the side aisles, which are the remains of a narthex or a quadruple, two-storey portico which used to be a recovery for pilgrims. The façade, in Lombard Gothic style, is hut-shaped, with ogival arches and portal decorated with cotto columns and vegetable motifs, as well as a rose window enclosed with a series of circular decorations.

The cloister (likely built in the 14th century, and restored in the following one) includes a portico with rib vaults on all four sides. A series of pillars supports, in the upper floor, a loggia with small columns. Under the lower floor are two registers of frescoes executed in the late 15th century, and depicting the Life of St. Benedict. The scenes were mostly based on episodes of the saint's life as narrated by Gregory the Great. The style of the surviving frescoes is late Gothic.

== Sources ==
- Ania, Antonio (1973). L'abbazia dei santi Nazario e Celso. Vercelli: Edizioni S.E.T.E.
