= Rice Girl =

1956 film

- Directed by: Raffaello Matarazzo
- Written by: Aldo De Benedetti; Ennio De Concini
- Starring: Elsa Martinelli
- Cinematography: Franco Villa
- Music by: Angelo Francesco Lavagnino
- Release date: 27 January 1956
- Country: Italy
- Language: Italian

Rice Girl (Italian: La risaia) is a 1956 Italian melodrama film directed by Raffaello Matarazzo.

== Plot ==
Pietro, the owner of a large paddy, recognizes among his young workers Elena, his natural daughter. He then begins to follow her and to protect her, causing misunderstandings in his family.

== Locations ==
The movie was shot in Cascina Graziosa in Cameriano of Casalino (Novara). (Info by the Dizionario del Turismo Cinematografico)

== Production ==
The film is part of the sentimental melodramas, commonly called tearjerking (of which Matarazzo was the greatest exponent), then in vogue among the Italian public, then renamed by critics with the term neorealism of appendix

It was the first film in Cinemascope and in color made by Matarazzo, it was at the time presented as a popular remake of the neorealist masterpiece Riso amaro by Giuseppe De Santis of 1949.

It was shot for exteriors in the Casalino countryside, in the province of Novara.

It is the first film shot in Italy by Elsa Martinelli on her return from Hollywood where she made her debut alongside Kirk Douglas in the western film The Indian Hunter by André De Toth.

== Distribution ==
The film was released on the Italian cinema circuit on January 27, 1956.

== Cast ==
- Elsa Martinelli: Elena
- Folco Lulli: Pietro
- Michel Auclair: Mario
- Vivi Gioi: Elena's mother
- Lilla Brignone: Adele, Pietro's wife
- Rik Battaglia: Gianni
