= Battle of Palestro =

1859 battle

Coordinates: 45°18′44″N 8°32′46″E

- Part of Second Italian War of Independence
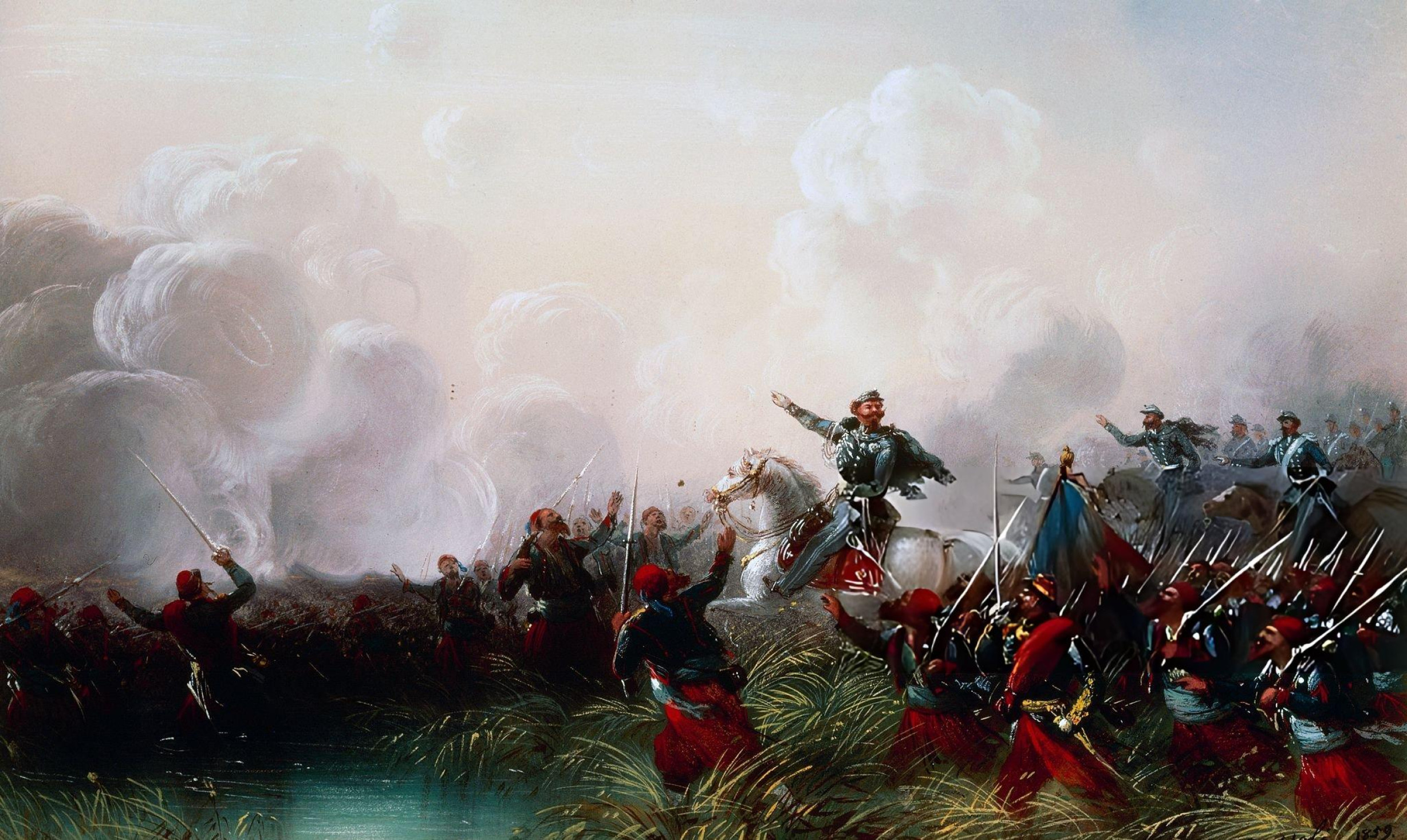
- King Victor Emmanuel II with French zouaves at the Battle of Palestro. Painting by Carlo Bossoli, 1859.
Date	30–31 May 1859
Location	Palestro, Italy
Result	Franco-Sardinian victory

Belligerents
Sardinia (Second French Empire) French Empire	Austrian Empire

Commanders and leaders
Victor Emmanuel II	Friedrich Zobel

Strength
14,000 (Second French Empire) 1,000 or more	<14,000

Casualties and losses
600	2,000

The Battle of Palestro was fought on 30–31 May 1859 between the Austrian Empire and the combined forces of the Kingdom of Sardinia-Piedmont and France. The Franco-Piedmontese forces were victorious. It was fought just south to Palestro, a town in what is now the province of Pavia in northern Italy. It was believed that the Battle of Palestro was the last European battle in which a European Monarch rode into battle, that being King Victor Emmanuel II, who directly entered the fray with the Austrians.

== Background ==
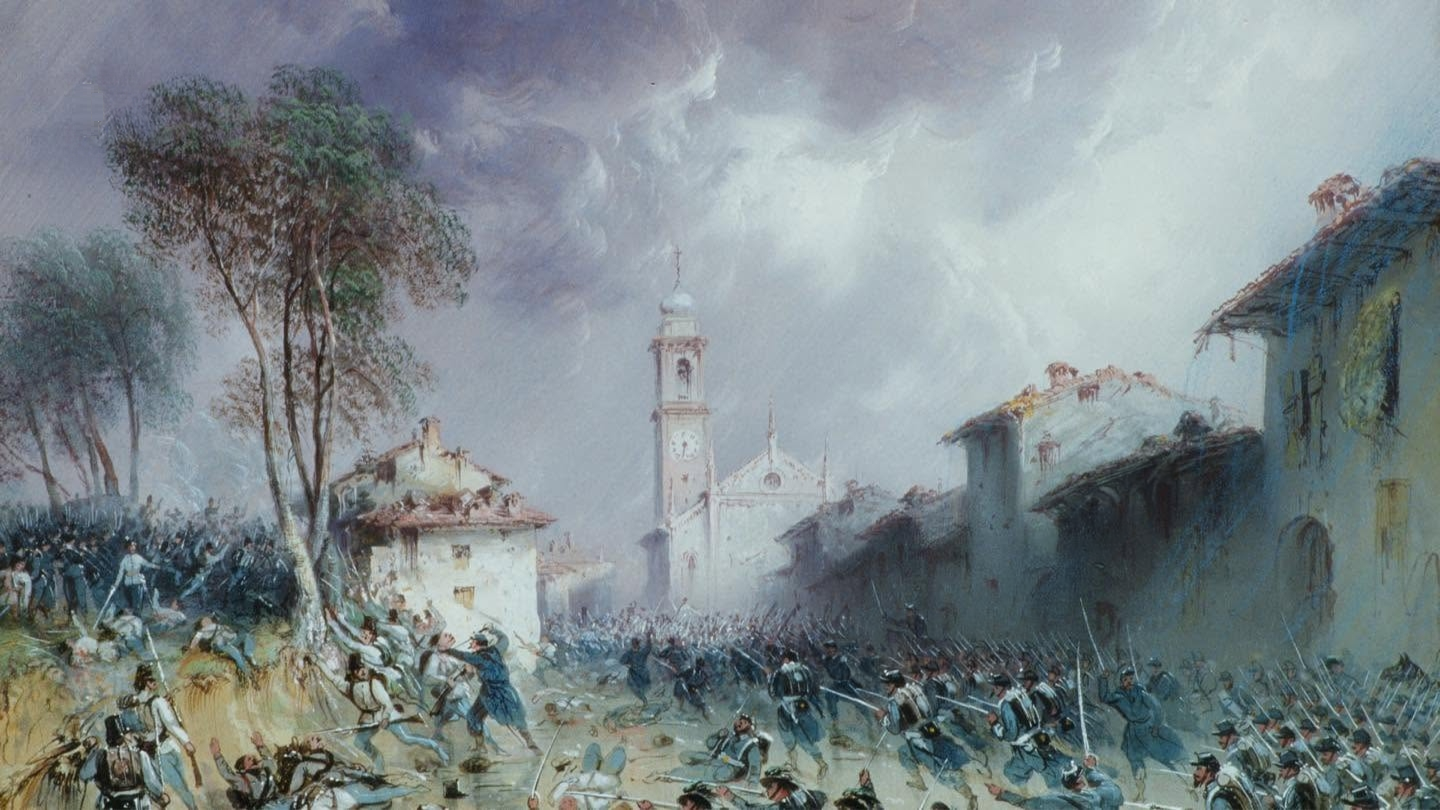
Piedmontese assault against Austrian soldiers in Palestro

Ferenc Gyulay, anticipating an advance on Milan, but unsure of the route, had placed his VIII and IX Korps south of the Po river from Pavia to Piacenza. Gyulay had assigned Zobel's VII Korps responsibility for the Sesia sector. However, on 30 May, four Piedmontese divisions had established a bridgehead across the Sesia, occupying Palestro, Vinzaglio, and Confienza. This included Enrico Cialdini's 4th Division, Giovanni Durando's 1st Division, and Mollard's 3rd Division. François Certain de Canrobert's III Corps, Adolphe Niel's IV Corps, MacMahon's II Corps, and the Imperial Guard advanced in support of the Piedmontese.

== Battle ==
On 31 May, Zobel counterattacked with two of his VII Korps divisions, and Szabo's brigade from II Korps, which was repulsed. A defining moment came when the 3rd Zouaves, accompanied by Victor Emmanuel II, crossed the canal, attacking the Austrian left flank, forcing their withdrawal toward Robbio.

The 4th Piedmontese Division under general Enrico Cialdini took position between Palestro and the road to Robbio, with the 10th Infantry Regiment on his left, the 9th Regiment defending Cascina San Pietro, and the 3rd Zouaves Regiment on his right flank, on an island in the river known as Sesietta. The Piedmontese at Cascina San Pietro were also under heavy attack from Austrian troops from Rosasco. The situation was solved by the rushed attack of the 3rd Zouaves Regiment under Colonel Chabron, who attacked the left flank of the Austrian contingents. The Zouaves were able to reach the enemy's artillery, defended by the 7th Tirolese Hunters Regiment. Then they launched a bayonet attack against the four infantry battalions of the 12th Regiment "Archduke William".

Military historian Geoffrey Wawro stated that while the Austrians new rifle (the Lorenz) was technically superior over the French, many of the poorly trained Austrian units chose to discard their unfamiliar rifles and fight with their bare hands instead.

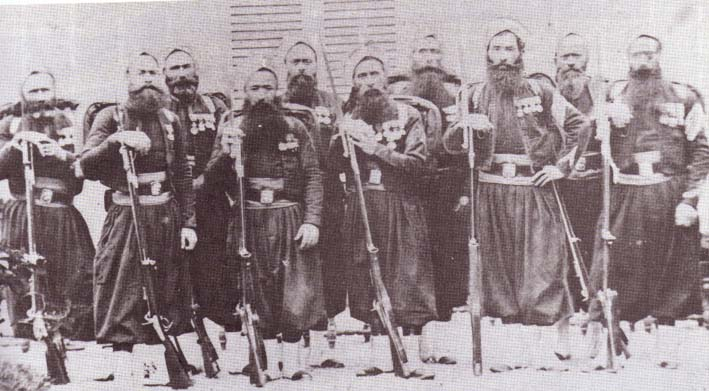
French Zouaves de la Garde in Italy, 1859

According to Frederick Schneid, "The allied army was now in force on the east bank of the Sesia in Lomellina. Applying Jomini's advice, the divisions of the Piedmontese Army comprised the blocking force, permitting the French army to march unimpeded to Novara."

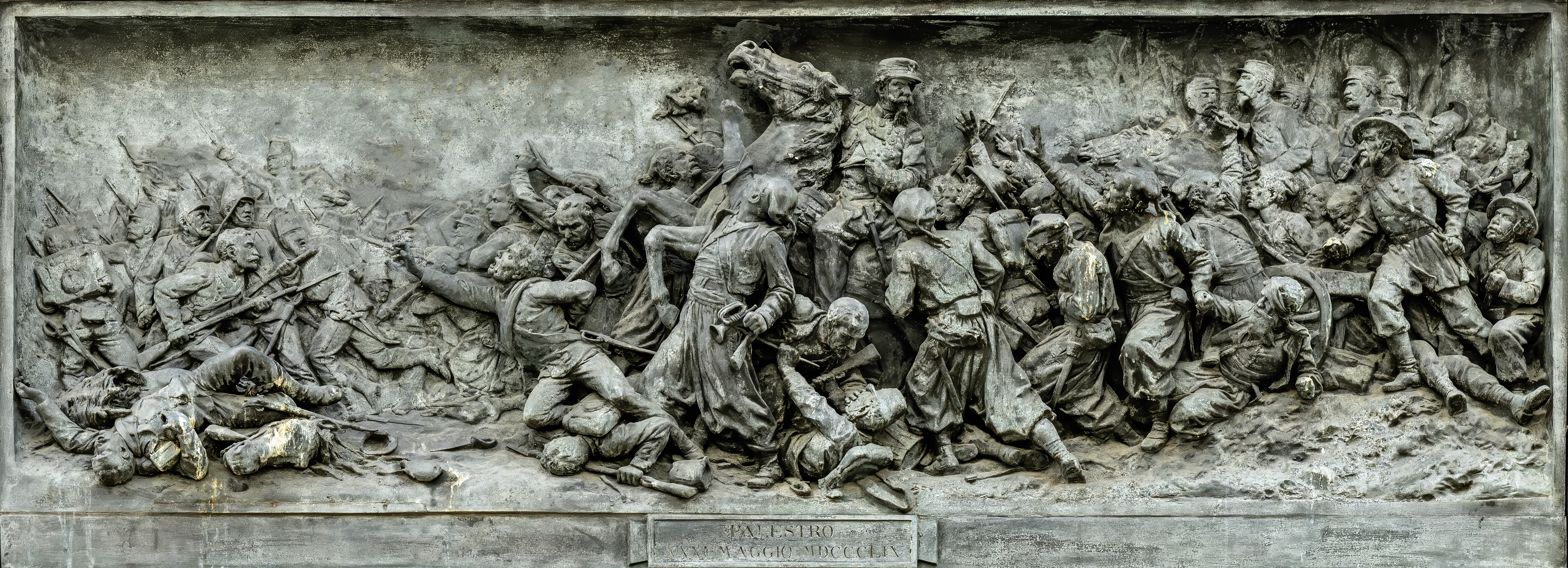
Battaglia di Palestro by Ettore Ferrari Venice

== Aftermath ==
Emperor Franz Josef and Feldmarschall Heinrich von Heß had arrived from Vienna in time to witness Gyulay's defeat, and the 2nd Army's retreat into Lombardy. On 3 June, Gyulay was ordered to take any and all action to defend the frontier. Gyulay thus held the line from Magenta to Abbiategrasso.
