= Borgo Vercelli =

- Comune
- Comune di Borgo Vercelli
- Coat of arms

- Location within Italy Location within Piedmont
- Coordinates: 45°22′N 8°28′E
- Country: Italy
- Region: Piedmont
- Province: Vercelli (VC)

Government
  - Mayor: Mario Demagistri

Area
  - Total: 19.4 km^{2} (7.5 sq mi)
- Elevation: 126 m (413 ft)

Population (31 December 2014)
  - Total: 2,245
  - Density: 116/km^{2} (300/sq mi)
- Demonym: Borgovercellesi
- Time zone: UTC+1 (CET)
  - Summer (DST): UTC+2 (CEST)
- Postal code: 13012
- Dialing code: 0161
- Website: Official website

Borgo Vercelli is a comune (municipality) in the Province of Vercelli in the Italian region Piedmont, located about 70 kilometres (43 mi) northeast of Turin and about 7 kilometres (4 mi) northeast of Vercelli.

Borgo Vercelli borders the following municipalities: Casalino, Casalvolone, Vercelli, Villata, and Vinzaglio.

The Battle of Vercellae is traditionally deemed to have occurred here in 101 BC. The economy is based on the production of rice.

== People ==
- Blessed Enrichetta Alfieri (1891-1951), a Roman Catholic professed religious of the Sisters of Charity of Saint Jeanne-Antide Thouret
