= Casalvolone =

Casalvolone Casale Vallonis
- Comune
- Comune di Casalvolone
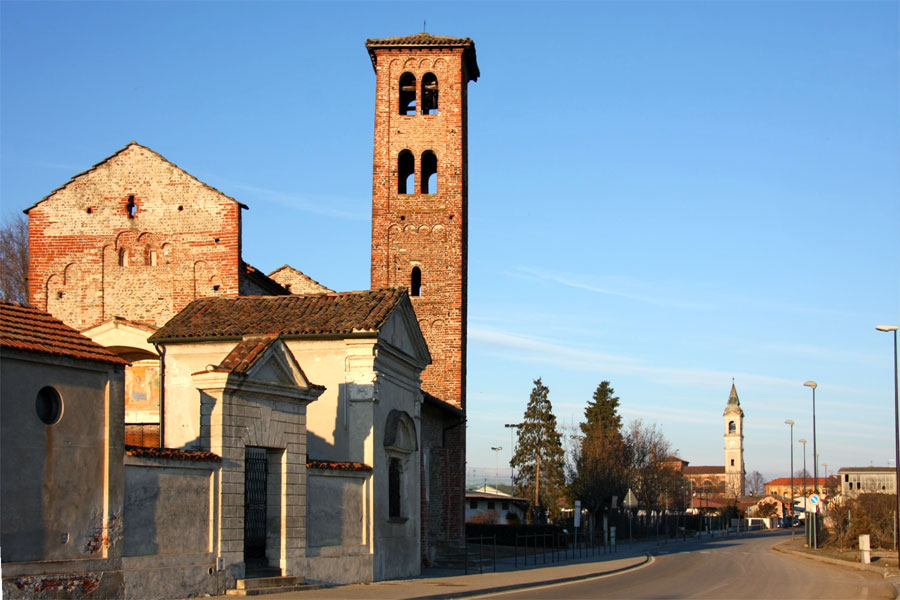
- The pleban church of St. Peter, Casalvolone

- Location within Italy Location within Piedmont
- Coordinates: 45°24′N 8°28′E
- Country: Italy
- Region: Piedmont
- Province: Novara (NO)

Government
  - Mayor: Ezio Piantanida

Area
  - Total: 17.49 km^{2} (6.75 sq mi)
- Elevation: 141 m (463 ft)

Population (Apr 4, 2017)
  - Total: 864
  - Density: 49.4/km^{2} (128/sq mi)
- Demonym: Casalvolonesi
- Time zone: UTC+1 (CET)
  - Summer (DST): UTC+2 (CEST)
- Postal code: 28060
- Dialing code: 0161
- ISTAT code: 003041
- Patron saint: San Pietro
- Saint day: 29 june
- Website: Official website

Casalvolone is a comune (municipality) in the Province of Novara in the Italian region Piedmont, located about 70 kilometres (43 mi) northeast of Turin and about 13 kilometres (8 mi) southwest of Novara.

Casalvolone borders the following municipalities: Borgo Vercelli, Casalbeltrame, Casalino, San Nazzaro Sesia, and Villata.

== History ==
The name come from Casale Vallonis in Latin.

The history of Casalvolone during the Middle Ages is closely linked with its abbey, which is mentioned for the first time in 975, when it was led by the Benedictines.

Cistercians, coming from the abbey of Morimondo, replaced the Benedictines in 1169.

A 1225 document traces the abbey back to the work of the three Ardizzone brothers, Enrico and Tommaso di Casalvolone.

It is unknown precisely when the abbey was abandoned; certainly the transformation into abbey in the 15th century led to a decline, because in 1497 it is not mentioned among the abbeys of the Italian Cistercian Congregation of San Bernardo.

Its assets were confiscated in the Napoleonic period and in 1819 the monastic complex became private property. The abbey church was reduced to a small oratory and demolished in the early 20th century. Of the monastic complex remains the church of San Pietro al Cimitero, which served as a parish for the people.
