= Piazza Pietro Ottinetti =

Square in Ivrea, Italy

- City square
- {{{other_names}}}
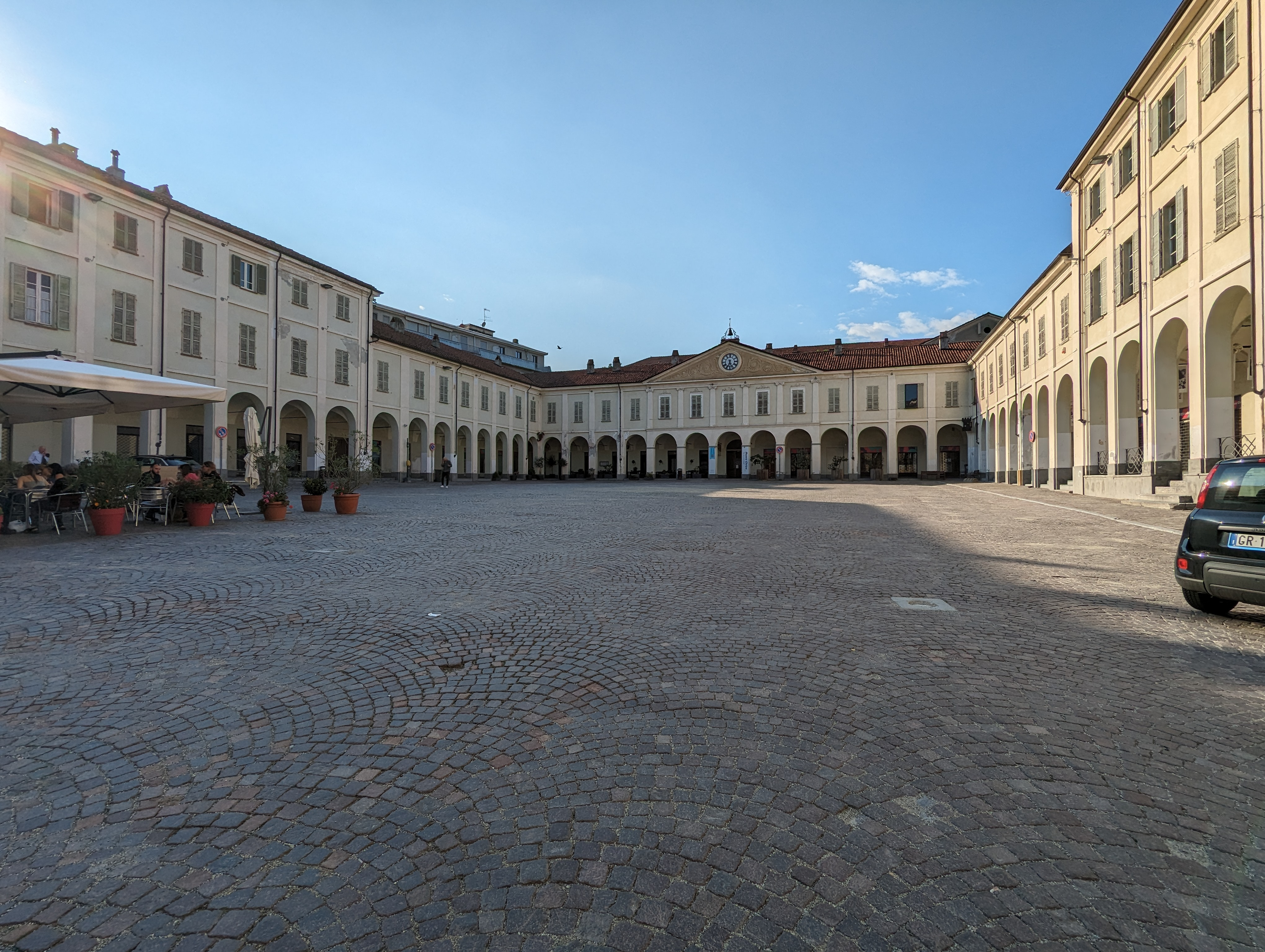
- Piazza Pietro Ottinetti in 2024
- Location: Ivrea, Italy
- Interactive map of Piazza Pietro Ottinetti
- Coordinates: 45°28′03″N 7°52′42″E

Piazza Pietro Ottinetti is a square in the center of Ivrea, Italy.

== History ==
The square corresponds to the inner courtyard of the former Monastery of the Clarisses in Ivrea. Following their arrival in the city in the 14th century, the institution's growth required a gradual expansion of the monastery's premises, which was carried out by incorporating and renovating adjacent buildings. With the French Revolution and Napoleonic rule, religious orders were suppressed, and the complex became public property, being repurposed as a barracks—a function it retained even after 1814.

The square was created in 1844 with the demolition of the Church of Santa Chiara and the southern part of the old monastery, thus opening up the internal courtyard. The works were specifically intended to create a space to host the grain market, as the porticos could provide shelter for the grain in case of bad weather.

The new square, originally named after Charles Albert of Sardinia, was later dedicated in 1945 to Italian partisan Piero Ottinetti.

The barracks were finally dismantled only after World War II, and in the 1960s, the premises facing the square were assigned by the municipality to host public services.

== Description ==
The square, the largest in Ivrea, covers an area of 2,200 square meters and opens onto the northern side of Via Palestro, the main street of the historic center of Ivrea.

The buildings surrounding the square house the Pier Alessandro Garda Civic Museum and the Ivrea Civic Library. The square often serves as a backdrop for cultural events and leisure activities, transforming into a stage for outdoor theater performances and, every winter, hosting an ice skating rink.
