= Nibbiola =

Comune in Piedmont, Italy

- Comune
- Comune di Nibbiola
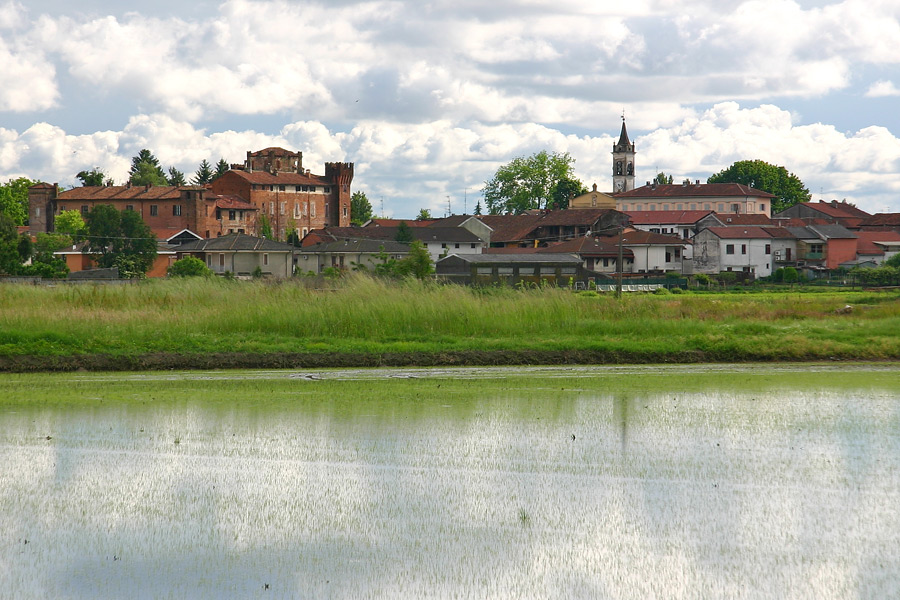
- Castle in Nibbiola

- Coat of arms

- Location within Italy Location within Piedmont
- Coordinates: 45°22′N 8°40′E
- Country: Italy
- Region: Piedmont
- Province: Novara (NO)
- Frazioni: Cascina Castellana, Cascina Caldare, Cascina Gambarera, Cascina Montarsello, Cascina La Valle, Cascina Romagnolo, Cascina Dossi, Cascina Pascoli, Cascina Vicaria

Government
  - Mayor: Mario Anselmo

Area
  - Total: 11.3 km^{2} (4.4 sq mi)
- Elevation: 133 m (436 ft)

Population (Dec. 2004)
  - Total: 762
  - Density: 67.4/km^{2} (175/sq mi)
- Demonym: Nibbiolesi
- Time zone: UTC+1 (CET)
  - Summer (DST): UTC+2 (CEST)
- Postal code: 28070
- Dialing code: 0321
- Patron saint: St. Catherine

Nibbiola (Piedmontese: Nibiola) is a comune (municipality) in the Province of Novara in the Italian region Piedmont, located about 80 kilometres (50 mi) northeast of Turin and about 10 kilometres (6 mi) southeast of Novara.

Nibbiola borders the following municipalities: Garbagna Novarese, Granozzo con Monticello, Novara, Terdobbiate, and Vespolate.

== History ==
The area of Nibbiola was inhabited in ancient times, as attested by archaeological findings (necropolis). it is mentioned however only in 902 AD.

== Main sights ==
- The Castle, erected in 1198 by the commune's consuls, the Graciano of San Vittore. It was renovate in the 15th century. Built in brickwork, it has in the entrance side two corner towers and a central one, with a still-working draw-bridge. In the central court a Giardinone ("Big Garden") was added when the castle became a residence.
- Church of San Vittore is modern, on the site of an edifice of the 11th century destroyed in the early 19th century.
- Church of Santa Maria (16th century), located outside the town.

== Demographic evolution ==
Historical population

Year	Pop.	±%
1861	1,103	—
1871	1,117	+1.3%
1881	1,273	+14.0%
1901	1,373	+7.9%
1911	1,278	−6.9%

Year	Pop.	±%
1921	1,243	−2.7%
1931	1,172	−5.7%
1936	1,157	−1.3%
1951	1,147	−0.9%
1961	943	−17.8%

Year	Pop.	±%
1971	727	−22.9%
1981	683	−6.1%
1991	641	−6.1%
2001	720	+12.3%

Source: Data from ISTAT
