= Vespolate =

- Comune
- Comune di Vespolate
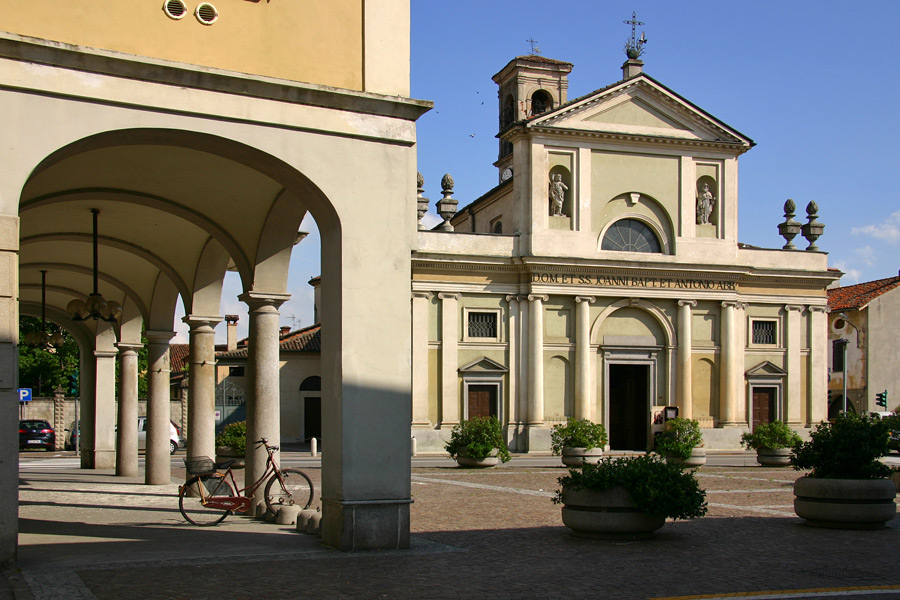
- Martyrs Square of Liberty in Vespolate

- Location within Italy Location within Piedmont
- Coordinates: 45°21′N 8°40′E
- Country: Italy
- Region: Piedmont
- Province: Province of Novara (NO)

Area
  - Total: 17.8 km^{2} (6.9 sq mi)

Population (Dec. 2004)
  - Total: 2,054
  - Density: 115/km^{2} (299/sq mi)
- Demonym: Vespolini
- Time zone: UTC+1 (CET)
  - Summer (DST): UTC+2 (CEST)
- Postal code: 28079
- Dialing code: 0321
- Website: Official website

Vespolate is a comune (municipality) in the Province of Novara in the Italian region Piedmont, located about 80 kilometres (50 mi) northeast of Turin and about 12 kilometres (7 mi) southeast of Novara. As of 31 December 2004, it had a population of 2,054 and an area of 17.8 square kilometres (6.9 mi^{2}).

Vespolate borders the following municipalities: Borgolavezzaro, Confienza, Granozzo con Monticello, Nibbiola, Robbio, Terdobbiate, and Tornaco.

== Demographic evolution ==
Historical population

Year	Pop.	±%
1861	2,583	—
1871	2,790	+8.0%
1881	2,922	+4.7%
1901	3,206	+9.7%
1911	3,101	−3.3%

Year	Pop.	±%
1921	2,813	−9.3%
1931	2,740	−2.6%
1936	2,640	−3.6%
1951	2,677	+1.4%
1961	2,636	−1.5%

Year	Pop.	±%
1971	2,414	−8.4%
1981	2,165	−10.3%
1991	2,108	−2.6%
2001	2,076	−1.5%

Source: Data from ISTAT
