= Oldenico =

- Comune
- Comune di Oldenico
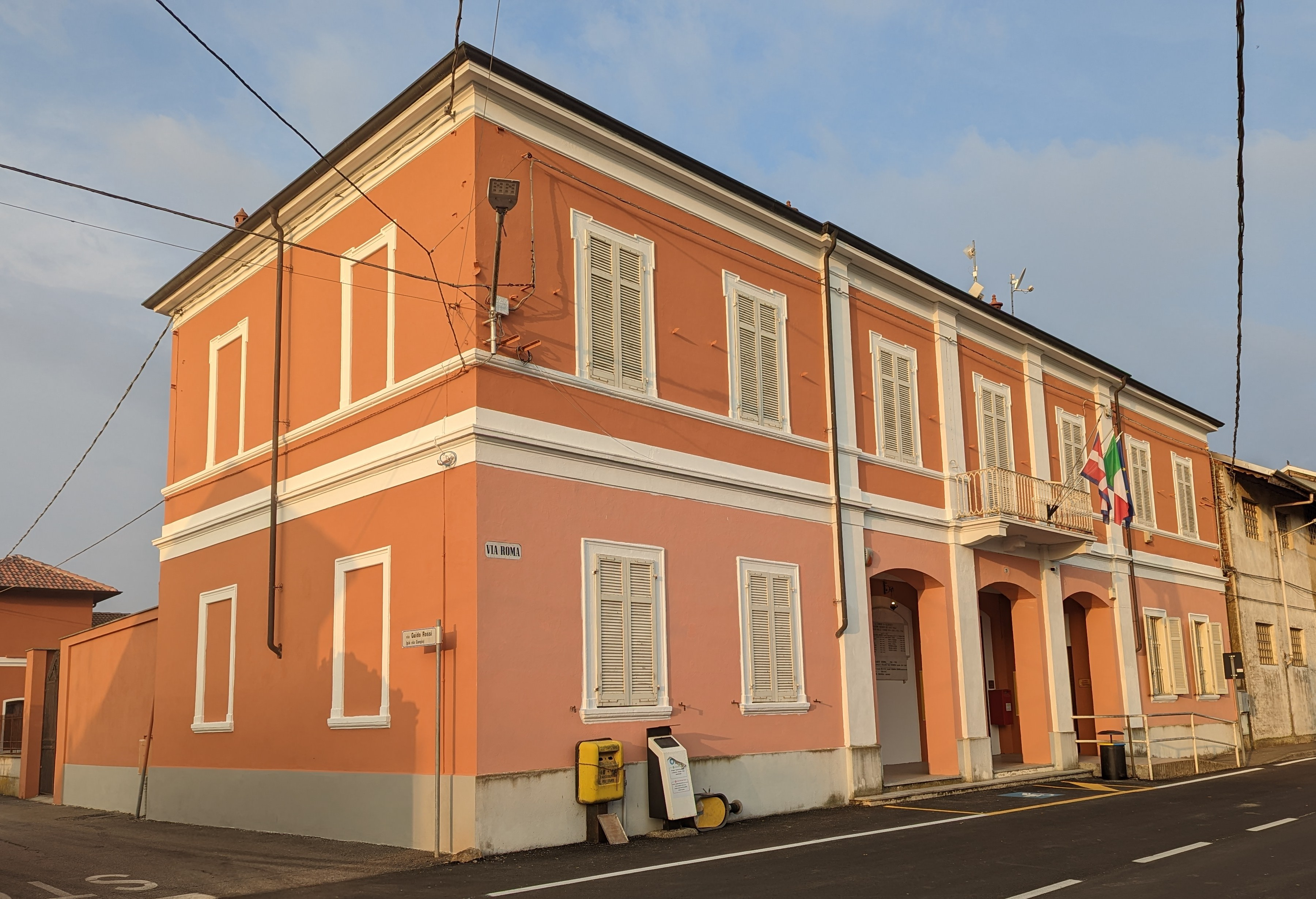
- Town hall

- Coat of arms

- Location within Italy Location within Piedmont
- Coordinates: 45°24′N 8°23′E
- Country: Italy
- Region: Piedmont
- Province: Vercelli (VC)

Government
  - Mayor: Guido Francione

Area
  - Total: 6.5 km^{2} (2.5 sq mi)

Population (Dec. 2004)
  - Total: 236
  - Density: 36/km^{2} (94/sq mi)
- Time zone: UTC+1 (CET)
  - Summer (DST): UTC+2 (CEST)
- Postal code: 13030
- Dialing code: 0161

Oldenico is a comune (municipality) in the Province of Vercelli in the Italian region Piedmont, located about 70 kilometres (43 mi) northeast of Turin and about 10 kilometres (6 mi) northwest of Vercelli.
