= Palestro =

- Comune
- Comune di Palestro
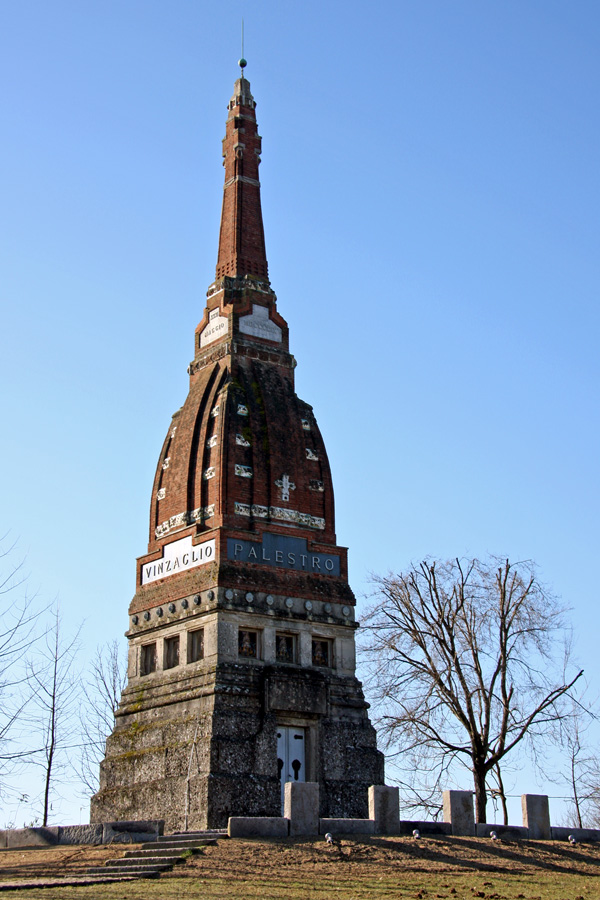
- Monument to the victims of the Battle of Palestro.

- Coat of arms

- Location within Italy Location within Lombardy
- Coordinates: 45°18′N 8°32′E
- Country: Italy
- Region: Lombardy
- Province: Pavia (PV)
- Frazioni: Pizzarosto

Government
  - Mayor: Maria Grazia Grossi Tinti

Area
  - Total: 18 km^{2} (6.9 sq mi)

Population (30 April 2010)
  - Total: 2,022
  - Density: 110/km^{2} (290/sq mi)
- Demonym: Palestresi
- Time zone: UTC+1 (CET)
  - Summer (DST): UTC+2 (CEST)
- Postal code: 27030
- Dialing code: 0384
- Patron saint: San Martino di Tours
- Saint day: 11 November
- Website: Official website

Palestro is a town and comune in the province of Pavia. It is located on the banks of the river Sesia.

== History ==
Although located in area settled by Celts, Etruscans, Romans and Lombards, Palestro is mentioned for the first time in 999 AD, when it was given to the bishop of Vercelli by emperor Otto III. It was located in the Via Francigena and at the time it was a fortified borough. Later it was ruled by the Visconti of Milan (1335-1452), then by the Borromeo family and, from 1500, by Spain, which was ended by its acquisition by the Duchy of Savoy in 1614.

Palestro was the site of the Battle of Palestro of 30–31 May 1859, in the course of the Second Italian War of Independence

== Twin towns ==
Palestro is twinned with:

- Montebello della Battaglia, Italy, since 1984
