= Granozzo con Monticello =

- Comune
- Comune di Granozzo con Monticello
- Coat of arms

- Location within Italy Location within Piedmont
- Coordinates: 45°22′N 8°34′E
- Country: Italy
- Region: Piedmont
- Province: Novara (NO)

Government
  - Mayor: Arrigo Benetti

Area
  - Total: 19.5 km^{2} (7.5 sq mi)

Population (1 January 2008)
  - Total: 1,368
  - Density: 70.2/km^{2} (182/sq mi)
- Demonym: Granozzesi
- Time zone: UTC+1 (CET)
  - Summer (DST): UTC+2 (CEST)
- Postal code: 28060
- Dialing code: 0321
- Website: Official website

Granozzo con Monticello is a comune (municipality) in the Province of Novara in the Italian region Piedmont, located about 80 kilometres (50 mi) northeast of Turin and about 10 kilometres (6 mi) southwest of Novara.
