= Desana Castle =

Castle in Piedmont, Italy

- Castello di Desana
- Desana, Piedmont, Italy
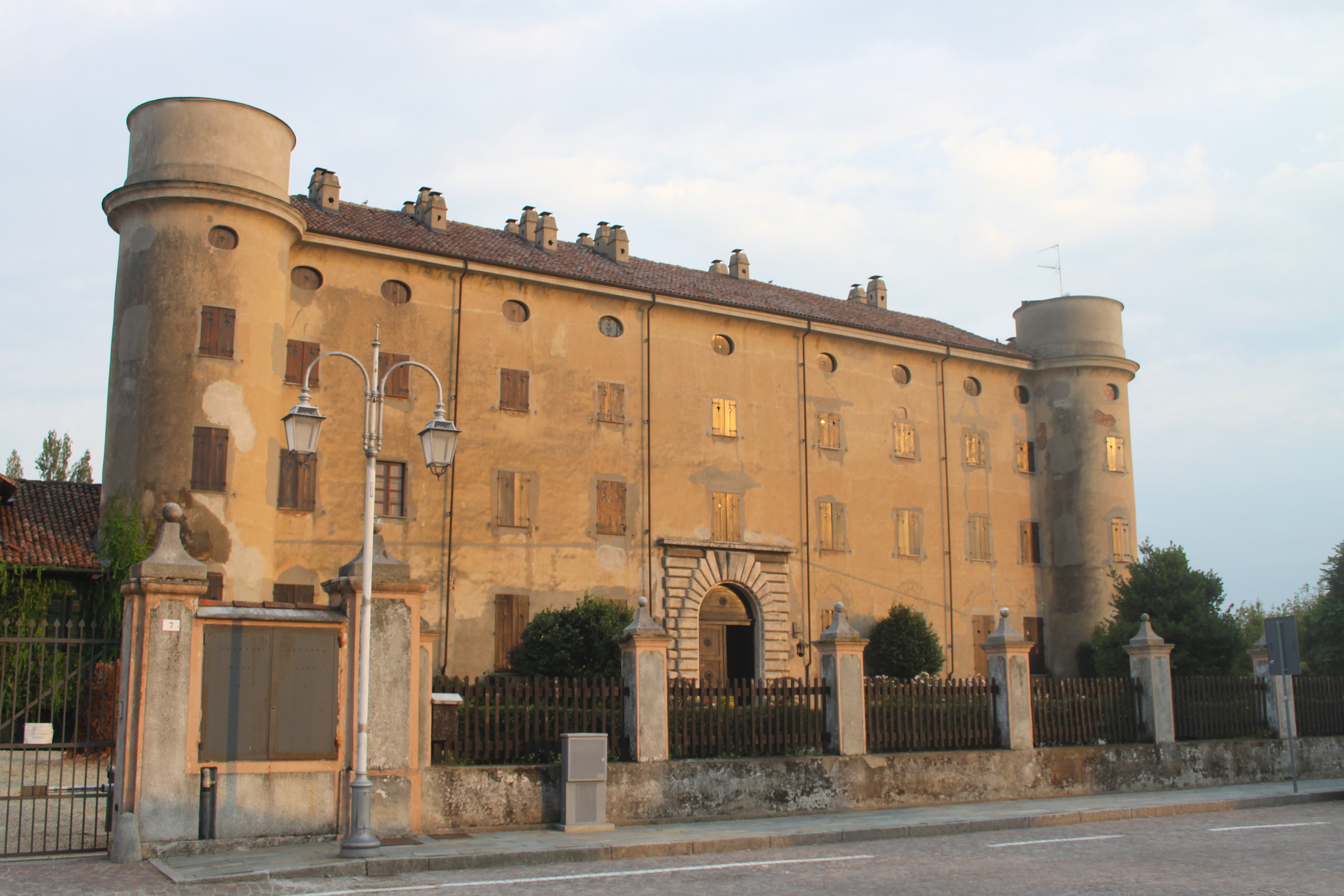
- Desana Castle in 2022

Site information
- Type: Castle

Location
- Coordinates: 45°16′04.07″N 8°21′27.07″E

Desana Castle (Italian: Castello di Desana) is a castle located in Desana, Piedmont, Italy.

== History ==
The earliest records concerning the castle date back to the 10th century, when the structure, likely built by the bishops of Vercelli for defensive purposes, was granted to Cuniberto during the Arduinid era. After returning under the control of the bishops of Vercelli, around 1145 it passed to the civil authority of the city; it was later destroyed in 1317 during the conflicts between the Marquisate of Montferrat and the Visconti of Milan. In the 15th century the territory was granted to the nobleman Lodovico Tizzoni, who rebuilt the village of Desana and fortified the stronghold. A namesake descendant of his was later made Count of Desana in 1510, and the castle became the seat of his court, hosting nobles and literary figures. After various changes of ownership, the castle passed to Vitale Rosazza in 1833, who restored it in 1840, giving it its present appearance.

== Description ==
The castle originally had a quadrangular layout with circurlar towers at the corners and was surrounded by a moat. During the 19th-century reconstruction, the original plan was preserved, but the façades were altered, giving it an appearance closer to that of an elegant country residence. The castle is surrounded by an extensive park.
