= Consignationes beneficiorum diocesis Novariensis =

Medieval manuscript reporting the investments of the Diocese of Novara properties

Consignationes bonorum Ecclesiasticorum Urbis et Dioecesis inter quas bona Collegiatarum S. Ambrosii Viglevanensis S. Gaudentii Gambolati iussu fratris Guillelmi anno 1347
- Archive of Novara Cathedral
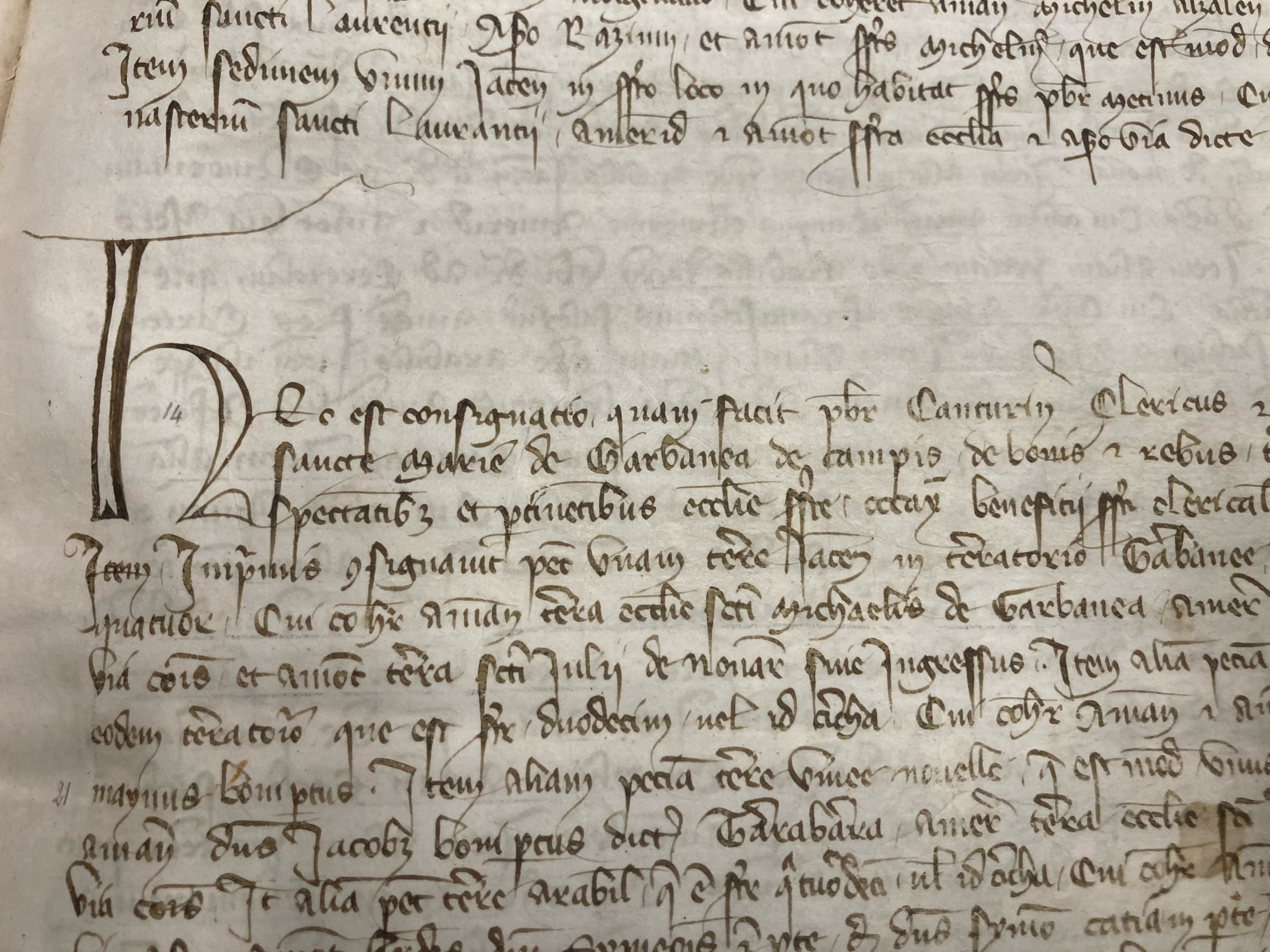
- Beginning of the benefice investiture of Oratorio di Santa Maria (Garbagna Nov.)
- Date: 1347
- Place of origin: Diocese of Novara
- Language: Medieval Latin
- Compiled by: all those invested with benefits of ecclesiastical lands of the Diocese of Novara
- Material: parchment
- Size: 37 × 27 cm; 216 leaves; 400 sides

Consignationes beneficiorum diœcesis Novariensis (or simply Consignationes) is a 400-page parchment manuscript preserved in the archives of Novara Cathedral. It records the investments of the ecclesiastical properties of the Diocese of Novara in 1347, almost like a cadastre.

== History ==
The document was requested by the then bishop of Novara, Friar William of Cremona, who governed the diocese from 1343 to 1356. The purpose was to prevent disputes, litigation, and misappropriation by neighboring residents or local lords during periods of ecclesiastical vacancy following the death of clerics. At the same time, it would benefit the clerics and their successors when it came time to access the property of the churches they administered.

To compile the work, all clerics invested with ecclesiastical lands were ordered to submit to the episcopal court a detailed list of lands (with intended use and size), neighboring properties/owners and roads.

Although the document has never been authenticated by a public notary, its usefulness was confirmed by the bishops who succeeded it and it still provides valuable information.

== Description ==
=== Structure ===
The work consists of 216 bound folios, protected by a wooden cover. The binding is in very poor condition due to age and use. Several pages are yellowed or damaged by humidity, and one folio is mended with a needle. The two initial folios contain an incomplete two-column index, added later and still in excellent condition.

The following inscription can be found on the leather strips on the back: n. 135 - [Con]signation[es] - [bo]norum Ecclesias[ticorum] - [Urbis] et Dioece[sis] - inter quas - [bon]a Collegia[tarum] - [S. Amb]ro[sii] Viglevanen[sis] - S. Gaudent[ii] Gambola[ti] - iussu - [fr]atr[is] Guillel[mi] - anno [1]347 - XX.

Each quintet (a bundle of five sheets folded in the middle and inserted into each other)) ends with a box containing the words that begin the next quintet. This box is also present at the bottom of the last page, which suggests that the work consisted of at least one other volume.

=== Numbering ===
The work uses Roman numerals, beginning with no. I on the third sheet and ending with no. CCXVIII on the 216th sheet, suggesting that four sheets are missing. However, the irregularity is more marked, as several tears testify to the actual removal of pages, and in some places the numbering advances without apparent reason, paralleling a change in the exposition style.

=== Writing and language ===
The pages are covered in dense writing, between 40 and 49 lines per page. Different hands wrote the script, using different styles, and in some pages the typeface resembles modern cursive. These pages are characterized by a very incorrect and careless expression.

Reading is not difficult, despite the numerous and often inconsistent abbreviations. However, rare or unknown names have generated serious uncertainty in the transcription process, especially due to the poor differentiation of some letters, particularly the intervocalic v, the u in the body of the word, and the n. The numerous hands that composed or transcribed the work, which gave rise to the aforementioned inconsistent abbreviations, also led to noticeable variations in the spelling of several names, for example, Catia - Cacia - Cazia. This variation may reflect local pronunciation peculiarities.

=== Content ===
The manuscript opens with four pages of index, followed by the incipit «hec tabola cntinet beneficia in pnti libro descripta de quibus facte fucernt csignationes tpe Rev.mi domini Guglielmi Epi novariensis».

Although the title claims to list the properties of the Diocese of Novara in 1347, the manuscript only partially fulfills its intended purpose: numerous deliveries are interrupted, suspended and never concluded, of some only the incipit is present, so that a detailed picture is available only of the parishes belonging to the ancient country around Novara, with a few exceptions.

Given the difficulty of transcribers in interpreting the spelling of the beneficiaries' reports, numerous proper names of the owners were left blank, thus losing valuable historical information.

At the end there is a pen-drawn representation of a kneeling priest in the act of offering the Consignationes to a bishop seated in the chair, evidently to be identified with William of Cremona.

== Publication ==
The first mention of the work appeared in a writing by Francesco Pezza from Mortara in the Bollettino Storico per la Provincia di Novara in 1907, relating to the investments of the Abbey of Sant'Albino (Mortara)

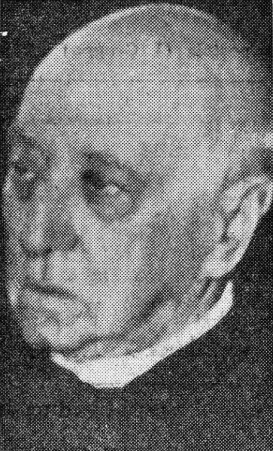
Lino Cassani studied Consignationes for a long time, wrote an article in 1935 and contributed to the document transcription between 1937 and 1939

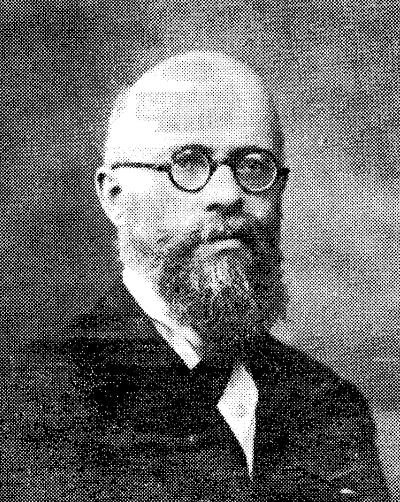
Gottardo Mellerio contributed to the document transcription between 1937 and 1939

In the same journal, the canon of Novara Cathedral Lino Cassani dedicated an entire article to it in 1935. Cassani believed that Novara papers published up to that point (Faustino Curlo, Le carte dell'Archivio di S. Gaudenzio di Novara, 1908; Giovanni Battista Morandi, Le carte del Museo Civico di Novara (881-1346), 1913; G. Basso, F. Gabotto, A. Lizier, A. Leone, G. B. Morandi, O. Scarzello, Le carte dell'archivio capitolare di Santa Maria di Novara, 1913-1924) could only provide a rough picture of Novara's ecclesiastical possessions in the Middle Ages: the documents covered a period of four centuries, during which the properties had certainly changed hands several times. He saw the manuscript of the Consignationes as a solution to the problem, as it was a snapshot of the properties in question in the year 1347.

Subsequently, in the context of the dissemination of documents belonging to the Diocesan Historical Archives which began at the end of the 19th century, to which the above-mentioned works belong, the complete text of the manuscript was made public: between 1937 and 1939 Lino Cassani himself, with the collaboration of professors Gottardo Mellerio and Mario Tosi, transcribed the entire content, which was published in the series Biblioteca della Società Storica Subalpina of the Deputazione Subalpina di Storia Patria, at the expense of the Municipality of Novara.

Thanks to the above-mentioned transcription, the document became public domain, so that scholars have since been able to use it as a primary source for historical dissertations on the Middle Ages in Novara. For example, Ernesto Colli, who dedicated a chapter to the Consignationes in almost all of his monographs on the towns of the Lower Novarese (see section Bibliography).

== Bibliography ==
- Cassani, Lino (1935). "Le «Consignationes» dei benefici ecclesiastici novaresi nel 1347". Bollettino Storico per la Provincia di Novara (1). Regia Deputazione di Storia Patria: 92–116.
- Cassani, Lino; Mellerio, Gottardo; Tosi, Mario, eds. (1937). Consignationes beneficiorum dioecesis Novariensis factae anno 1347 tempore Reverendissimi Domini Guglielmi Episcopi. Vol. 1. Novara: E. Cattaneo.
- Massa, Maurizio (1991), Le "Consignationes beneficiorum" e la distribuzione della proprietà ecclesiastica nella diocesi di Novara a metà del XIV secolo (abstract) (PDF), Università degli Studi di Milano, pp. 31–36 – via Società Storica Novarese

As described above, Ernesto Colli often referred to the Consignationes in his works. Here are some references to the chapters that clearly exemplify the document content:

- Cassani, Lino; Colli, Ernesto (1948). "La consegna dei beni ecclesiastici di Garbagna nel 1347". Memorie storiche di Garbagna Novarese. Novara: Pietro Riva & C. pp. 51–53 – via Foto Emilio Alzati.
- Colli, Ernesto (1952). "La prima Chiesa Parrocchiale - S. Vittore e le «Consignationes» del 1347". Nibbiola nella sua storia. Novara: Tip. San Gaudenzio. pp. 47–49 – via Foto Emilio Alzati.
- Colli, Ernesto; Cassani, Lino (1956). "Vespolate e le Consignationes anno 1347". Vespolate nella sua storia. Novara: Provera. pp. 36–39 – via Foto Emilio Alzati.
- Colli, Ernesto (1960). "Gravellona nel 1347". Gravellona Lomellina nella sua storia. Novara: Tip. San Gaudenzio. pp. 39–42 – via Foto Emilio Alzati.
- Colli, Ernesto; Giarda, Gino (1973). "Olengo e le "Consignationes" dell'anno 1347". Olengo di Novara nella sua storia. Novara: Tip. San Gaudenzio. pp. 43–47 – via Foto Emilio Alzati.
- Colli, Ernesto (1967). "Tornaco e le "consignationes" dell'anno 1347 e la toponomastica del Comune". Tornaco e Vignarello nella loro storia. Novara: F.lli Paltrinieri. pp. 43–45 – via Foto Emilio Alzati.
- Colli, Ernesto (1970). "Terdobbiate e le "Consignationes" del 1347". Dott. Comm. Mons. Carlo Fusi e Terdobbiate. Novara: Tip. San Gaudenzio. pp. 65–69 – via Foto Emilio Alzati.
