= Visconti =

Visconti is a surname which may refer to:

== Italian noble families ==
- Visconti of Milan, ruled Milan from 1277 to 1447
  - Visconti di Modrone, collateral branch of the Visconti of Milan
- Visconti of Pisa and Sardinia, ruled Gallura in Sardinia from 1207 to 1250

== People ==
=== Pre-20th century ===
- Alfonso Visconti (1552–1608), Roman Catholic cardinal
- Antonio Eugenio Visconti (1713–1788), Roman Catholic cardinal
- Azzone Visconti (1302–1339), lord of Milan
- Bartolomeo Visconti (died 1457), Roman Catholic prelate and Bishop of Novara
- Bernabò Visconti (1323–1385), Italian soldier and lord of Milan
- Caterina Visconti (1361–1404), Duchess of Milan
- Ennio Quirino Visconti (1751–1818), Italian antiquarian and art historian
- Federico Visconti (1617–1693), Cardinal and Archbishop of Milan from 1681 to 1693
- Filippo Maria Visconti (1392–1447), Duke of Milan
- Filippo Visconti (bishop) (1596–1664), Roman Catholic Bishop of Catanzaro
- Filippo Maria Visconti (bishop) (1721–1801), Archbishop of Milan
- Galeazzo Visconti (disambiguation), several people
- Gaspare Visconti (1538–1595), Archbishop of Milan from 1584 to 1595
- Gian Galeazzo Visconti (1351-1402), first Duke of Milan
- Gian Maria Visconti (1388–1412), Duke of Milan
- Giovanni Visconti (disambiguation), several people
- John of Gallura (died 1275), John (or Giovanni) Visconti, Judge of Gallura, Sardinian ruler
- Louis Visconti (1791–1853), Italian-born French architect
- Ottone Visconti (1207–1295), Archbishop of Milan and lord of Milan
- Teobaldo Visconti (1210–1276), Pope Gregory X
- Uberto Visconti (1170–1248), Italian nobleman
- Valentina Visconti, Duchess of Orléans (1371–1408)
- Valentina Visconti, Queen of Cyprus (c. 1357–before September 1393)

=== 20th-21st century ===
- Adriano Visconti (1915–1945), Italian World War II flying ace
- Gary Visconti (born 1945), American former figure skater
- Giovanni Visconti (cyclist) (born 1983), Italian road bicycle racer
- Jansen Visconti (born 1987 or 1988), American baseball umpire
- Luchino Visconti (1906–1976), Italian film, theatre, and opera director
- Tony Visconti (born 1944), American record producer, musician and singer

== Fictional characters ==
- Ace Visconti, a character in the 2016 online multiplayer horror game Dead by Daylight
- Ercole Visconti, a character in the 2021 Pixar film Luca

== Other ==
- Visconti (company), an Italian manufacturer of pens and other luxury goods
