= Lino Cassani =

Italian priest, historian and archaeologist

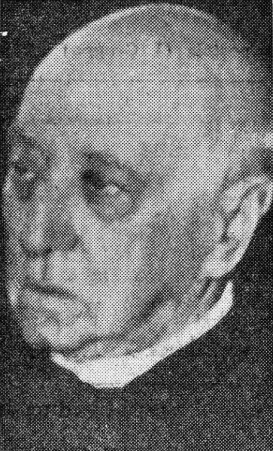
- Born: 8 July 1869; Gravellona Lomellina
- Died: 30 November 1963 (aged 94); Novara
- Citizenship: Italian
- Occupations: priest, historian, archaeologist
- Known for: works on the history and art of Novarese

Lino Cassani (8 July 1869 – 30 November 1963) was an Italian priest, historian and archaeologist, known for his works on history and art of Province of Novara. He is considered one of the fathers of Novara historiography.

== Biography ==
=== Childhood and education ===
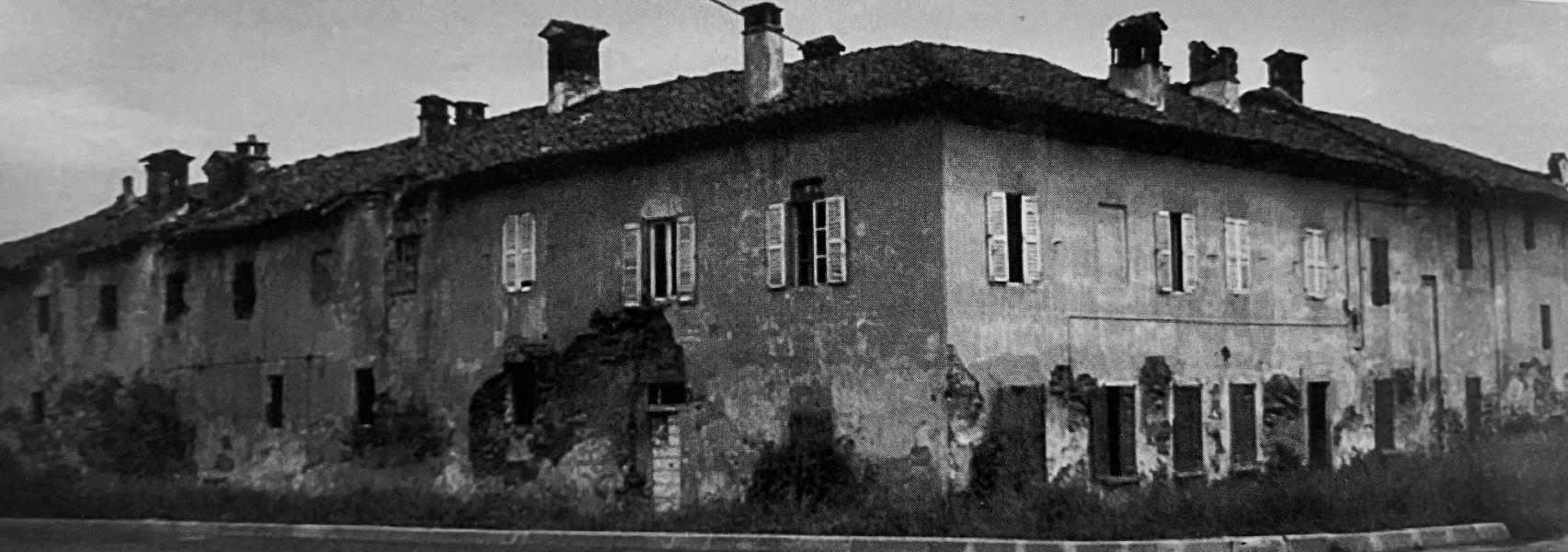
The old farmstead Borghetto (Garbagna Novarese), where Cassani spent his childhood

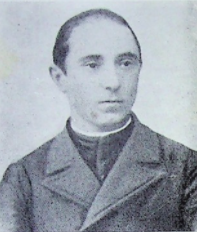
Young Lino Cassani

He belonged to the large Cassani family, skilled farmers who had cultivated the lands of the noble Novara families Tornielli and Bellini in Garbagna Novarese, Gravellona Lomellina and Borgolavezzaro for five centuries. During the first half of the 20th century several members of the family embarked on ecclesiastical careers, becoming beloved and respected figures in the Novara Church.

Lino was the son of Giuseppe (1841 – Novara, 16 October 1927), a fighter in the Battle of Magenta, who fought for years against the Bourbon brigandage in Sicily and participated in the Capture of Rome on 20 September 1870, finally returning to agricultural life in Gravellona Lomellina, San Pietro and Garbagna Novarese. It was in Garbagna that his son Lino spent his happy childhood at the Borghetto, where the family had been tenants for decades.

Between August 1882 and 1886, he was a high school student in Turin. At the oratory of Valdocco, he met and studied with Giovanni Bosco, for whom he always felt great affection and immense admiration. He was one of the few students of Giovanni Bosco who did not become a Salesian.

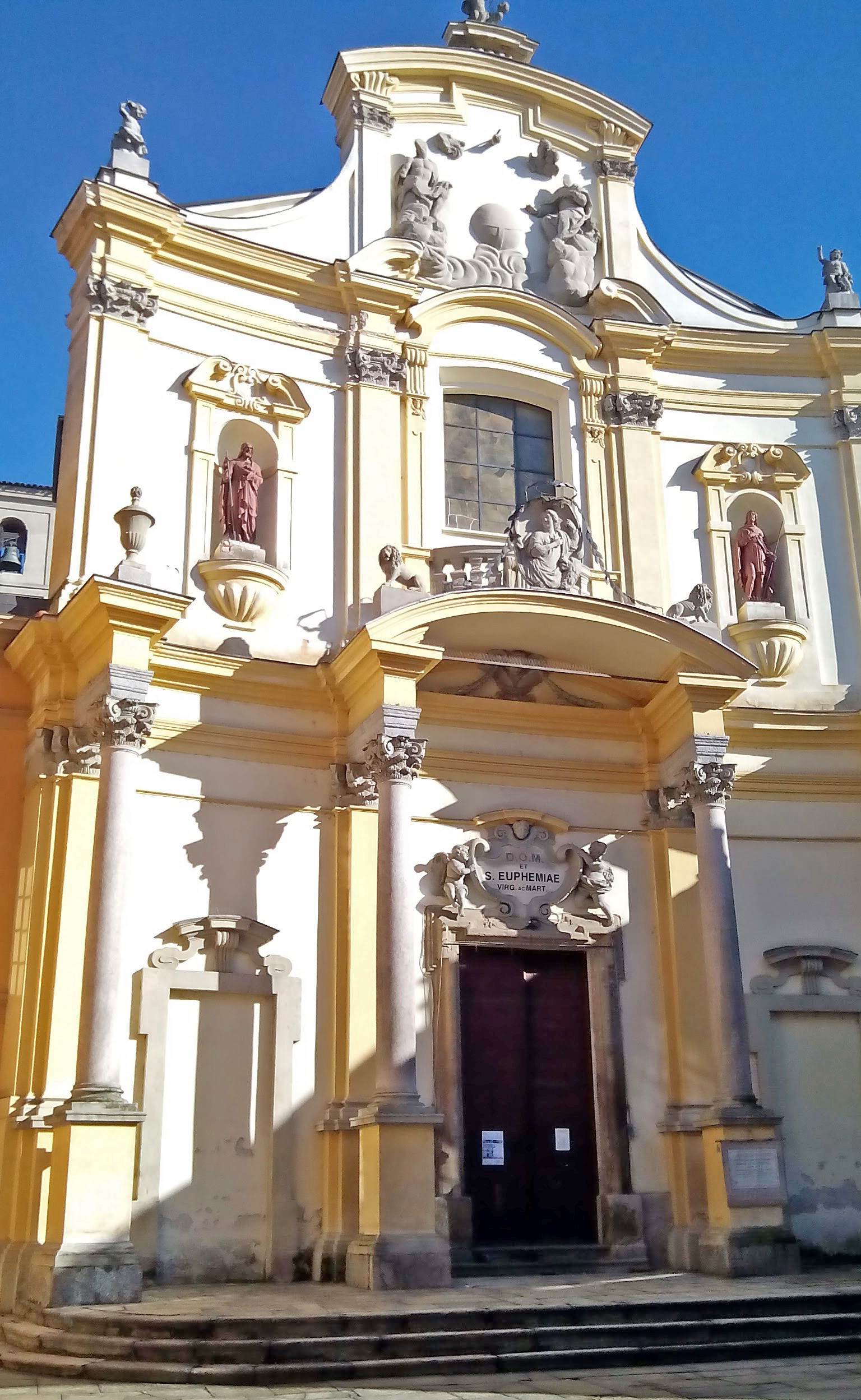
Church of Saint Euphemia (Novara), of which Lino Cassani was parish priest from 1900 to 1938

He was finally ordained a priest on July 8, 1893 and graduated in theology on July 8, 1899 in Rome.

=== Ministry and passion for art and history ===
His conversation was always a true joy of the spirit, not only because of his eclectic culture, but above all because it was embellished with a myriad of distant and recent memories of Novara and city history, which made him almost a living archive.

— Alessandro Aspesi, Mons. Prof. don Lino Cassani

He carried out his ministry in the provinces of Novara and Vercelli, in the parishes of San Pietro Mosezzo, Campertogno (1893–1895), Mollia and Saint Euphemia (1900–1938).

Great enthusiast of historical and archaeological studies, In the second half of the 1910s, he met and befriended Giovanni Battista Morandi, then a university student, when he was entrusted with the collection of artifacts from the defunct Archaeological Society. After Morandi's death in the fall of 1915, he continued his work, continuing to publish in the Bollettino Storico per la Provincia di Novara (founded by Morandi himself) and founding together with Alessandro Viglio the Società Storica Novarese in 1920, of which he was appointed treasurer. In 1926, on the occasion of the Jubilee of priesthood, the Historical Society officially commemorated him with gifts, displays of affection, and a visit to the National Boarding School, where he was an educator and spiritual director. During the Society's assembly, Alessandro Viglio announced his honor as Knight of the Order of the Crown of Italy.

Given the passion and competence demonstrated for historical and historical-artistic studies, between 1925 and 1935 he was appointed several times as a member of the provincial commission and inspector for the conservation of monuments and historical and artistic heritage, together with Viglio himself.

In 1929 he obtained the title of papal secret chamberlain.

Since the beginning of the 19th century, the dissemination of documents from the Archives of the Chapter of Canons of the Cathedral, part of the Diocesan Historical Archives, had begun in Novara. The operation was initially carried out by university and high school professors, such as Ferdinando Gabotto, Augusto Lizier, and Giovanni Battista Morandi. Lino Cassani also participated, working until 1937 with Mario Tosi and Gottardo Mellerio on the publication of the volumes of the Consignationes beneficiorum diocesis Novariensis: this is the transcription of a 400-page manuscript parchment volume containing the ecclesiastical properties of the diocese of Novara in 1347, commissioned by the then bishop, Guglielmo of Cremona. The value of this document, already recognized by the bishops who succeeded him as a true land registry, lay in preventing disputes or misappropriations of property between the population and the clergy.

In 1938, after 50 years of parish work, he became parish priest emeritus of Sant'Eufemia, and was appointed canon of the Novara Cathedral (a position which included the conservation of the chapter archive, a task which was very congenial to his interests and which he carried out with extraordinary commitment) and held the chair of Morals and Sacred Art in the Theological Seminary. He was member of the Monte di Pietà, too.

After the Second World War, in January 1946 the commissioner of the Deputazione Subalpina di Storia Patria (Subalpine Deputation of National History) Francesco Lemmi appointed Cassani commissioner of the local branch and attempted to convince him to keep it controlled by the central headquarters. The response came on June 28, 1946, during the branch's general assembly: citing the branch's merits and the recent support it had received from the Banca Popolare di Novara, Cassani advocated (and obtained) the reinstatement of the original free and independent Società Storica Novarese.

In March 1946 he lost his mother, aged 97.

He was later invested with further roles in the ecclesiastical hierarchy: domestic prelate on 20 March 1952 and provost of the Chapter in 1962.

=== Last years ===
In his later years, he retreated to private life, in his apartment on Via Mossotti in Novara, along with his sister Angela, who assisted him. Part of the apartment had been converted into a veritable museum, with rare antiques of great value: paintings, fresco fragments, statues, carpets, lace, ceramics, and engravings. Given his age, the bishop allowed him to celebrate Mass at home, as he also did during his 70th anniversary of priestly ordination, in July 1963.

=== Death ===
On the afternoon of November 30, 1963, he died suddenly while writing a book about Novara artists. The apartment's gas system leaked, initially causing his sister to become severely nauseous. While trying to help her, Cassani suffered a heart attack and collapsed next to her in the bathroom. No one else was in the house at the time. The alarm was raised by a salesman who rang the doorbell and became suspicious when he received no answer; the rescuers were forced to enter the apartment through a window, finding the priest lifeless and his sister unconscious. Both were taken by ambulance to the hospital, where Cassani was pronounced dead from gas asphyxiation, and his sister was admitted, who survived (she would die six years later, in 1969, at age 95).

All his possessions were inherited by the Salesians.

== Acknowledgements ==
The Società Storica Novarese commemorated the passing of its member with an article by Alessandro Aspesi, director of the Bollettino, in the first issue of 1964.

In 1978 the municipality of Novara named a street after him in the Sacro Cuore district.

In 1994 the journalist and writer Romolo Barisonzo dedicated a chapter to him in the third volume of the series Novaresi bella gente (Novaresi nice people), where he is described as having a scruffy appearance and as a fascinating conversationalist.

== Honors ==
Cavaliere dell'Ordine della Corona d'Italia - ribbon for ordinary uniform

Knight of Order of the Crown of Italy
— June 1926

== Works ==
A partial list of Lino Cassani's publications, in chronological order:

- Il primo ventesimo dell'opera salesiana in Novara [The twentieth anniversary of Salesian work in Novara] (in Italian). Novara: Tip. F.lli Miglio. 1913.
- Lino Cassani; Gottardo Mellerio; Mario Tosi (1937). Consignationes beneficiorum dioecesis Novariensis factae anno 1347 tempore reverendissimi domini Guglielmi episcopi [Investments of Novara diocese properties, made in 1347, at the time of the most reverend Bishop William] (in Latin). Novara: Tip. E. Cattaneo.
- Lino Cassani; Ernesto Colli (1948). Memorie storiche di Garbagna Novarese [Historical memories of Garbagna Novarese] (in Italian). Novara: Tip. Pietro Riva e C.
- Le sacre funzioni propiziatorie celebrate in Novara per la Prima Guerra d'Indipendenza (con l'elenco dei caduti alla Bicocca) [The holy propitiatory celebrations held in Novara for the First War of Independence (with the list of those fallen at Bicocca)] (in Italian). Novara: Tip. E. Cattaneo. 1949.
- L'esposizione dei cimeli, degli scritti e dei ritratti del ven. Bascapè - La biblioteca privata di Mons. Bascapè [The exhibition of the memorabilia, writings, and portraits of the Venerable Bascapè - The private library of Bishop Bascapè] (in Italian). Novara: Tip. E. Cattaneo. 1951.
- Lino Cassani; Ernesto Colli (1956). Vespolate nella sua storia [Vespolate in its history] (in Italian). Novara: Tip. Provera.
- Repertorio di antichità preromane e romane rinvenute nella Provincia di Novara [Collection of pre-Roman and Roman antiquities discovered in the Province of Novara] (in Italian). Novara: Società Storica Novarese. 1962.

=== Bollettino Storico per la Provincia di Novara ===
A partial list of articles published in the Società Storica Novarese's journal:

- "Gli affreschi quattrocenteschi della cascina Avogadro nel comune di Novara" [The 15th-century frescoes of Avogadro farmstead in the municipality of Novara]. BSPN (in Italian) (3): 77–86. 1917.
- "La parrocchialità della chiesa di S. Andrea in Novara nel secolo XII" [The parochiality of Saint Andrew church in Novara in the 12th century]. BSPN (in Italian) (1): 1–27. 1920.
- "La basilica di S. Michele in Oleggio" [Basilica of Saint Michael in Oleggio]. BSPN (in Italian) (3): 125–153. 1920.
- "Le origini di Gravellona Lomellina" [The origins of Gravellona Lomellina]. BSPN (in Italian) (3): 179–211. 1925.
- "La chiesa di S. Ambrogio in Novara" [Saint Ambrose church in Novara]. BSPN (in Italian) (4): 349–353. 1925.
- "Di un antico affresco nella Basilica di S. Michele in Oleggio" [An ancient fresco in the Basilica of Saint Michael in Oleggio]. BSPN (in Italian) (4): 451–464. 1927.
- "Gli arazzi del Duomo di Novara" [The tapestries of Novara Cathedral]. BSPN (in Italian) (4): 361–388. 1930.
- "Un importante e sconosciuto monumento romano a Novara ed altri ritrovamenti archeologici" [An important and unknown Roman monument in Novara and other archaeological finds]. BSPN (in Italian) (4): 495–502. 1932.
- "Montorfano di Mergozzo e la sua chiesa" [Montorfano of Mergozzo and its church]. BSPN (in Italian) (1/2): 97–139. 1933.
- "Le «Consignationes» dei benefici ecclesiastici novaresi nel 1347" [The "Consignationes" of Novara's ecclesiastical properties in 1347]. BSPN (in Italian) (1): 92–116. 1935.
- "I ritrovamenti archeologici nella "Novara quadrata" dei Romani" [Archaeological finds in the Roman "Square Novara"]. BSPN (in Italian) (2/4): 299–341. 1937.
- "Dov'era la basilica-sepolcro di San Gaudenzio" [Where the basilica-sepulchre of Saint Gaudentius was located]. BSPN (in Italian) (1): 1–4. 1954.

== Bibliography ==
- Cassani, Lino; Colli, Ernesto (1948). Memorie storiche di Garbagna Novarese [Historical memories of Garbagna Novarese] (in Italian). Novara: Tip. Pietro Riva & C – via Foto Emilio Alzati.
- Cassani, Lino (1962-04-01). "Io sono come la campana" [I am like the bell]. Bollettino Salesiano (in Italian) (7). Torino.
- Colli, Ernesto (1964). "Gli offerenti". Barbavara di Gravellona Lomellina [Barbavara of Gravellona Lomellina] (in Italian). Novara: Tip. La Moderna. pp. 45–50 – via Foto Emilio Alzati.
