= Odo e Riprando =

1991 Italian historical novel by Franco F. Ferrario

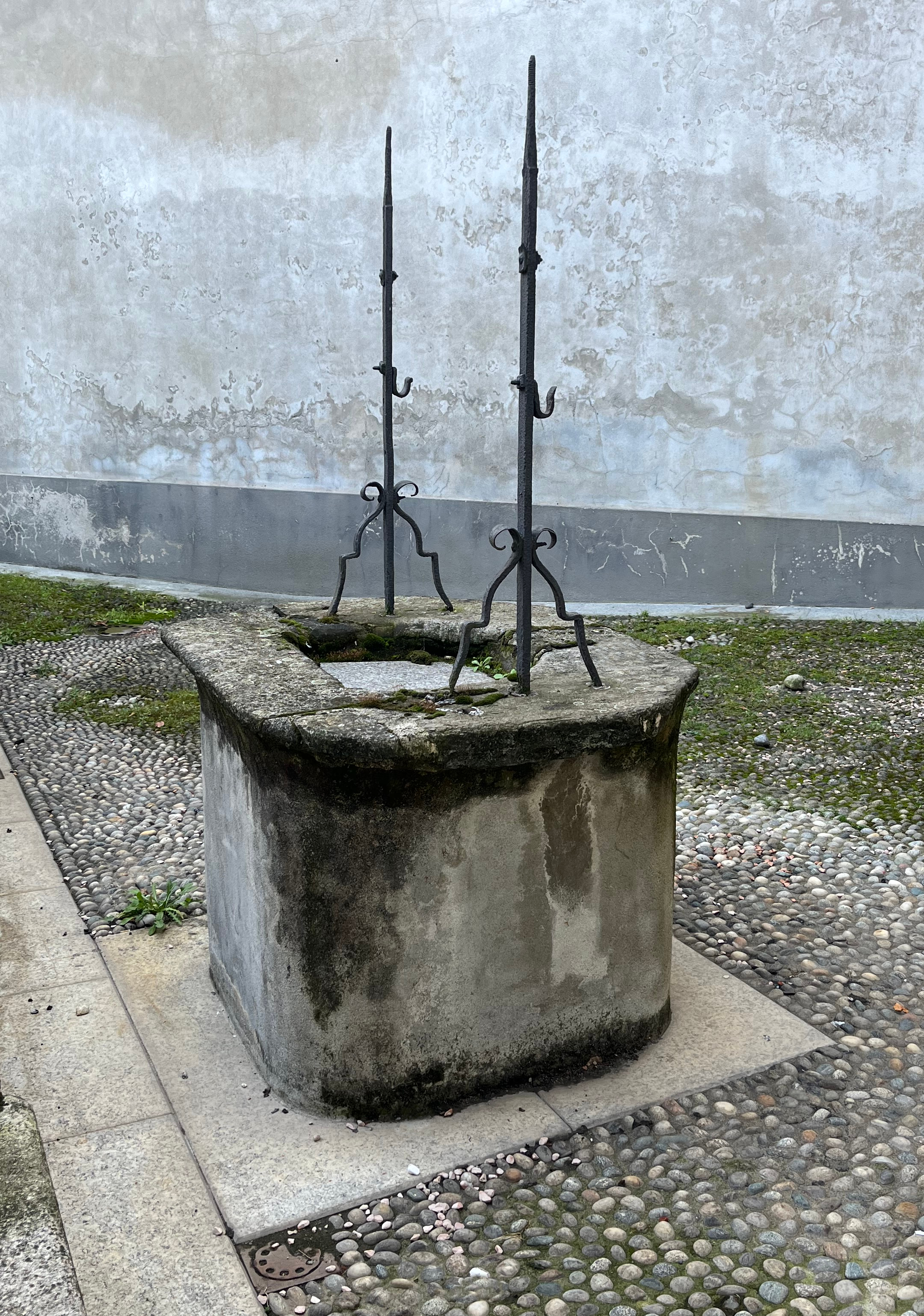
- 16th-century water well in Canonica alley (Novara), that inspired the opening scene
- Odo e Riprando (Oddo and Riprand); Il Castello di Pombia (Pombia Castle); L'epilogo (The Epilogue)
- Author: Tripeleff
- Illustrator: Tripeleff
- Country: Italy
- Language: Italian
- Genre: historical novel
- Publisher: Firenze Libri; Babilonia
- Published: 1991; 1994
- Media type: Print
- No. of books: 3
- Website: https://www.tripeleff.org/riprandiana

Odo e Riprando (English: Odo and Riprando) is an Italian historical novel by Tripeleff, the pen name of the writer it:Franco F. Ferrario. The novel is set in the Novara area in the 11th century and centres on the figures of Riprand of Pombia and Oddo II (Oddo of Teuzo), respectively the 47th and 48th bishops of Novara.

== Plot ==
=== Volume 1: Odo e Riprando ===
The first volume is set between July 1045 and August 1046 in the Novara area, Ossola and Valais. The narrative follows the lives of Riprand of Pombia, bishop and lord of Novara, and Odo of Teuzo, beginning with their first meeting near the well by the cathedral.

The story traces the protagonists' journey across the Novara region against the backdrop of the political and social tensions affecting 11th-century subalpine Italy, including the spread of the Patarine movement. Episodes involving local conflicts, the internal dynamics of the episcopal curia, and military expeditions against groups regarded as invaders follow one another, culminating in the events leading to the battle for the liberation of Alpe Veglia from the Alamanni occupiers.

=== Volume 2: Il Castello di Pombia ===
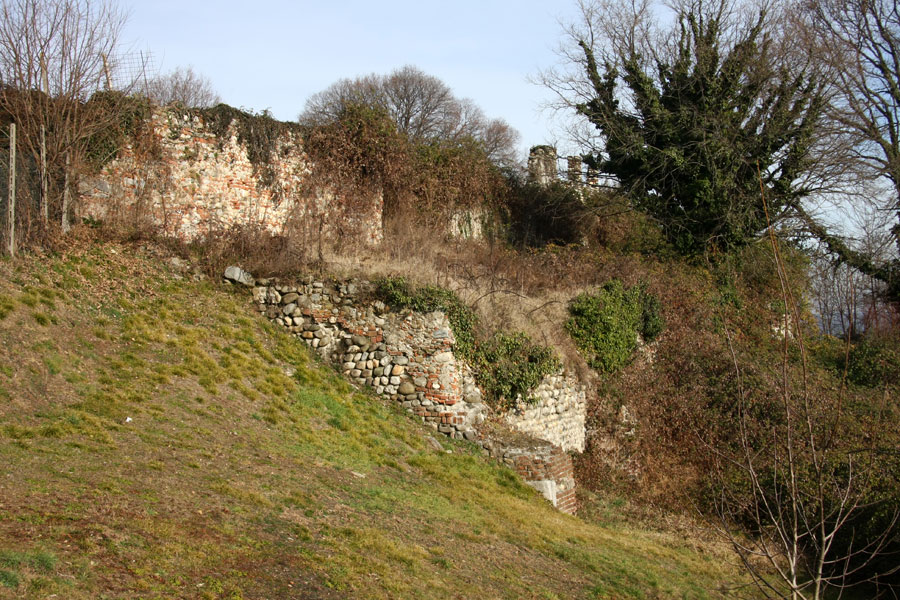
The ruins of the ancient castle of Pombia

The second volume is set in the Novara area between late August and mid-September 1046. At the request of the Counts of Pombia, brothers of Riprand, the bishop travels to the family castle on the banks of the Ticino, accompanied by Oddo, Trutmir and the episcopal entourage. The narrative centres on the fortunes of the Pombia family and the internal conflicts connected with the management of their estate, which is threatened with financial collapse. In this context, the legend of an ancient treasure believed to be hidden within the castle is revived, and the search for it involves both members of the household and their retainers. At the same time, the development of personal relationships among the characters is explored, particularly those concerning Odo, who becomes increasingly isolated within the Pombia household.

=== Volume 3: L'epilogo ===
The third volume is set in September 1046 and concludes the narrative, including a brief excursus on the subsequent careers of the main characters.

== Conception and editorial history ==
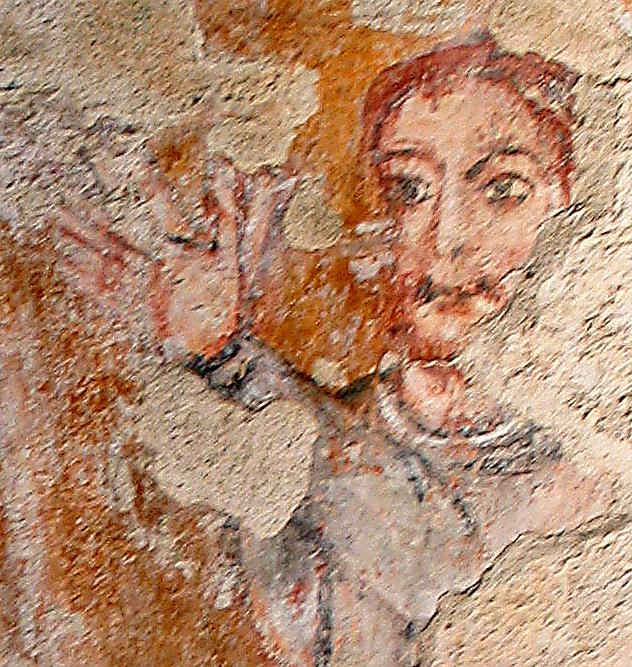
Fresco detail in the Oratory of San Remigio in Pallanza, portraying the patron, identified by Tripeleff with Riprand

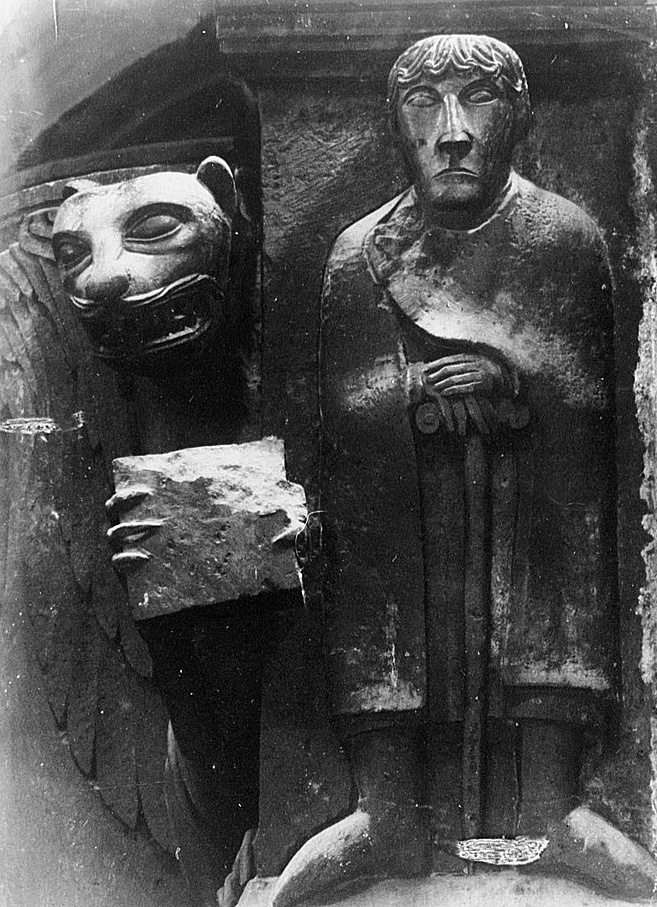
Pilgrim on the pulpit of the Basilica di San Giulio in Orta: Tripeleff suggests it represents Bishop Oddo II

According to the author, the original idea for the novel emerged in the late 1980s, during a period of interest in the medieval history of Novara. Beginning from an observation of the bell tower of Novara Cathedral, dating from that period, he undertook research into the events of the Novara region during the conflicts between Arduin of Ivrea and the Lombard episcopate. During this research he focused particularly on the historical figures of the bishops Riprando of Pombia and Oddo II, who later became the protagonists of the narrative. The ancient well at the base of the cathedral bell tower also provided the inspiration for the novel's opening scene (although it was no longer the original early medieval structure). The work, written over a period of a few months between 1989 and 1990, was completed for submission to the 1991 national literary competition L'Autore (The Author), organised by the publishing house Firenze Libri-Maremmi Editori for unpublished works. The novel won the competition and was published shortly thereafter as the author's narrative debut.

In 1993, a German translation appeared under the title Der Liebhaber des Bischofs (The Bishop's Lover). In 1994, the novel was reissued by Edizioni Babilonia together with the second volume, Il Castello di Pombia (Pombia Castle).

Tripeleff also began writing a third volume, The Conspiracy of the Canons, which was never completed or published. At the request of readers and enthusiasts of local history, he later added an appendix summarising the final events of the narrative and the subsequent careers of the principal characters. This text was issued under the title The Epilogue.

== Reception ==
The work won first prize in the national competition L'autore, organised by the publishing house Firenze Libri. It also achieved moderate commercial success over time, and quickly became a cult work within gay circles in Milan. The popularity of Odo e Riprando also gave rise to several related initiatives. In 1992, for example, a dramatized adaptation was staged in the Canonica alley in Novara (the setting of the opening scene), with historical introduction and musical accompaniment.

== Critical reception ==
A review of the novel appeared in 1992 in La Stampa, in an article devoted to local publishing. Marcello Giordani described Odo e Riprando as lying midway between historical novel and fantasy, focusing in particular on the portrayal of Bishop Riprand of Pombia, whose depiction was expected to provoke debate: a major political figure attentive to the moral renewal of his time, and at the same time a man deeply involved in a personal relationship with the cleric Oddo.

In 1997, the novel was mentioned by the American scholar Rinaldina Russell in The Feminist Encyclopedia of Italian Literature. In the entry on homosexuality, Odo e Riprando is cited as an example of a romantic reworking of medieval same-sex love.

In her essay L'eroe negato. Omosessualità e letteratura nel Novecento italiano (2000), the critic and writer Francesco Gnerre included Odo e Riprando among the works in the series Storie erotiche tra uomini published by Il dito e la luna. Gnerre interprets these works as part of a broader transformation in the representation of homosexuality in Italian literature between the 1980s and the early 2000s, highlighting their role in the cultural legitimisation of homosexual experience and imagery.

Examining the treatment of male homosexuality in Italian literature, the British scholar Derek Duncan interpreted its depiction as a form of threat in Umberto Eco's The Name of the Rose as emblematic of Italian literary tradition more broadly, and pointed to Odo e Riprando as an example of a more romantic evocation of medieval same-sex love.

== Awards ==
- 1991: First prize in the national competition L'autore, organised by Firenze Libri.
