= Carlo Maria Bascapè =

Italian Roman Catholic prelate

Venerable Carlo Maria Bascapè CRSP
- Bishop of Novara
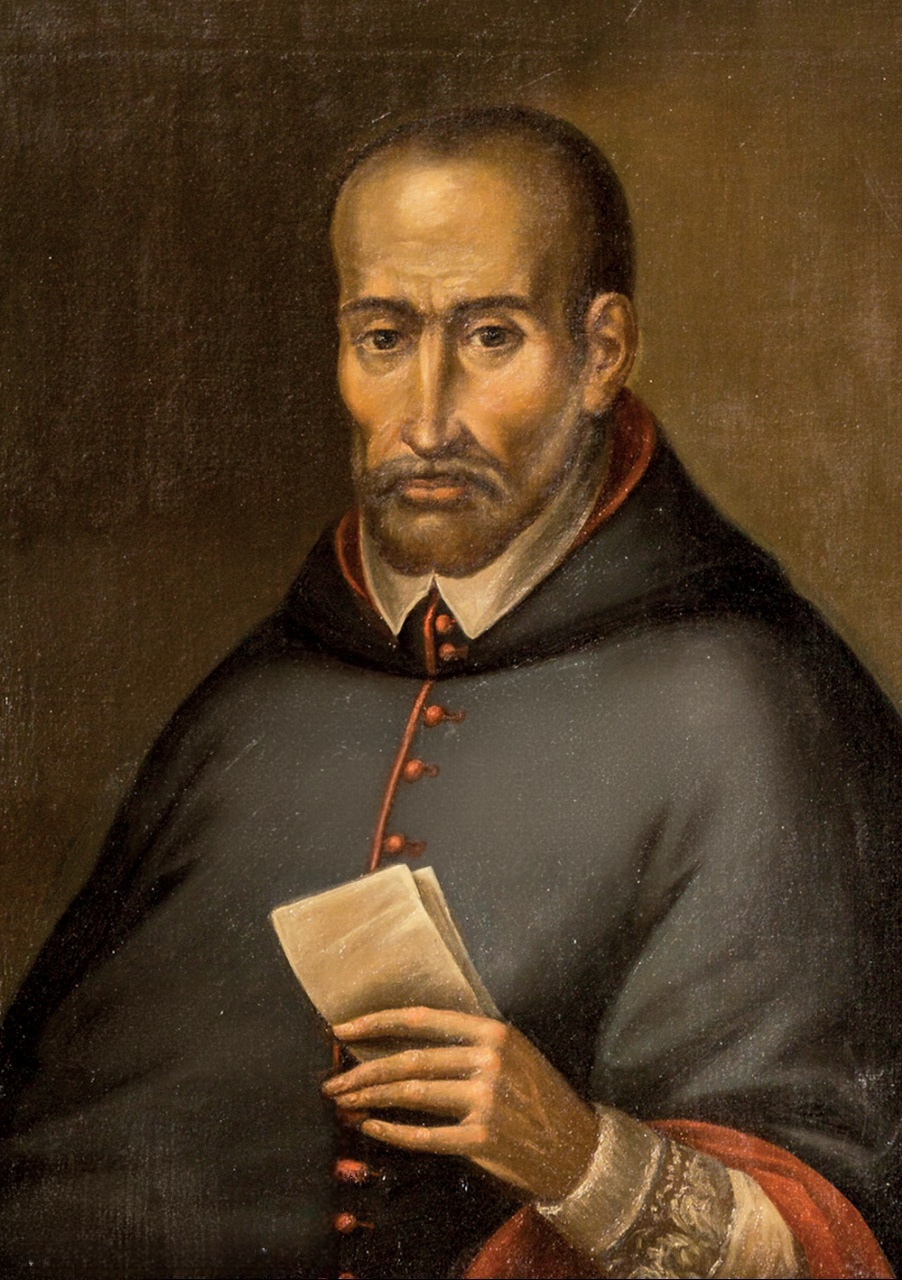
- Church: Roman Catholic Church
- Diocese: Novara
- See: Novara
- Appointed: 8 February 1593
- Installed: 30 May 1593
- Term ended: 6 October 1615
- Predecessor: Pietro Martire Ponzone
- Successor: Ferdinando Taverna

Orders
- Ordination: 29 July 1576
- Consecration: 24 February 1593 by Ludovico de Torres
- Rank: Bishop

Personal details
- Born: Giovanni Francesco Bascapè; 25 October 1550 Melegnano, Milan, Duchy of Milan
- Died: 6 October 1615 (age 64) Novara, Duchy of Milan
- Buried: Novara Cathedral
- Education: University of Pavia (JD, 1574)
- Coat of arms: Carlo Maria Bascapè's coat of arms

Carlo Maria Bascapè CRSP (Latin: Carolus a Basilica Petri; born Giovanni Francesco Bascapè, 25 October 1550 – 6 October 1615) was an Italian Roman Catholic prelate and scholar who served as Bishop of Novara from 1593 until his death. He was a close friend of Saint Charles Borromeo and assumed the first half of his religious name in honor of him.

Bascapè became titled as venerable on 19 December 2005, after Pope Benedict XVI confirmed his heroic virtue.

== Life ==
Carlo Bascapè was born in Melegnano, Milan, on 25 October 1550 to the nobles Angelo Bascapè and Isabella Giussani. At baptism, he was named Giovanni Francesco.

Bascapè studied humanities and classical languages under Marcantonio Maioragio, Milan's leading humanist and teacher of rhetoric. He moved to Pavia in 1568 for his studies at the college there in law, and he graduated with a doctorate in both civil and canon law in 1574. In Pavia, he joined the newly founded Accademia degli Affidati, members of which included scholars like Gerolamo Cardano. Bascapè received the minor orders in spring 1575.

He was ordained to the priesthood on 29 July 1576 and became a professed member of the Clerics Regular of Saint Paul after joining them in March 1578. His solemn profession into the order on 8 May 1579 saw him assume the religious name of "Carlo Maria". He had assumed the first half of his name in honour of Saint Charles Borromeo, whom he admired and respected.

Bascapé soon joined the staff of Archbishop Borromeo, who appreciated his juridical-humanistic erudition. He was appointed canon of the Cathedral of Milan and became a close associate of Borromeo. At his behest, he began research for a monumental work on Church history, De rebus eclesiasticis commentarii. However, he desisted when he heard that Caesar Baronius was already far advanced on the Annales Ecclesiastici.

In 1580, Bascapè was sent by Borromeo to Madrid to meet Philip II on his behalf due to conflicts that had arisen with the Spanish governor of Milan, Antonio de Guzmán Zúñiga y Sotomayor. The mission was a success as it managed to re-establish good relations between Charles Borromeo and the Spanish government. In Madrid, Bascapè befriended the theologian Louis of Granada, who would exert a profound influence on his spiritual writings.

After the death of Borromeo, Bascapè wrote De vita et rebus gestis Caroli cardinalis (Ingolstadt, 1592), one of the most substantial biographies of the saint. The book was a huge success and was later translated into several languages.

Bascapè served as the Superior General for the Barnabites from 8 May 1586 until 8 February 1593. At some stage between 1589 and 1590, he met with Pope Gregory XIV. He promoted the sainthood cause for Charles Borromeo and was present on 1 November 1610 when Pope Paul V canonized him as a saint. He was also present on 12 May 1602 previously when the same pope had previously beatified him.

On 8 February 1593 Pope Clement VIII appointed him Bishop of Novara. He received his episcopal consecration that same month on 24 February from Ludovico de Torres with Francesco Gonzaga and Owen Lewis serving as the co-consecrators; he was installed in his new diocese the following 30 May and worked his hardest to implement the reforms of the Council of Trent.

Following the example of Charles Borromeo, he showed deep attention to the training of the clergy, building new seminaries for theology scholars; he held episcopal synods and strived to ensure that the ecclesiastics measured up to their duties; he set up the Oblates of San Gaudenzio and San Carlo, a congregation of secular priests inspired by the Oblates of Saints Ambrose and Charles.

He encouraged the foundation of new confraternities in order to promote devotion within the people and the foundation of companies of the dead to provide masses for the souls of deceased members.

Bascapè served as bishop in his episcopal see until his death from a long illness on 6 October 1615. His remains were later relocated to the Cathedral of Novara in 1801.

== Beatification cause ==
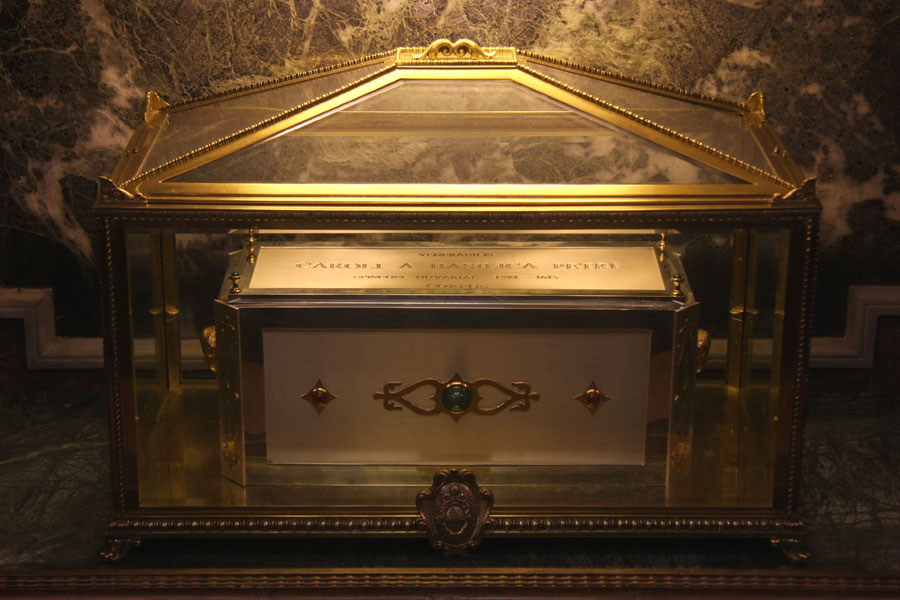
Tomb in Novara

The process for beatification opened in Novara under Bishop Placidio Maria Cambiaghi, who opened the informative process on 10 May 1966, while his successor, Aldo De Monte, closed the diocesane process on 4 December 1976. Bascapè's spiritual writings were all approved on 12 March 1982, and the Congregation for the Causes of Saints validated the informative process on 12 April 2002 while also receiving the positio in 2003.

Historians assented to the cause on 20 May 2003, as did the theologians on 9 March 2004, as well as the Congregations's members on 18 January 2005. He was proclaimed to be Venerable on 19 December 2005 after Pope Benedict XVI confirmed that Bascapè had lived a life of heroic virtue. The postulator assigned to the cause is Mauro Domenico Regazzoni CRSP.

== In fiction ==
Carlo Maria Bascapè is one of the main characters of Sebastiano Vassalli's historical novel La chimera.

== Works ==
- De regulari disciplina monimenta patrum. Mediolani: apud Pacificum Pontium. 1588.
- De vita et rebus gestis Caroli S.R.E. Cardinalis... libri septem. Ingolstadt: ex officina typographica Dauidis Sartorii. 1592.
- De Metropoli Mediolanensi. Mediolani: apud Paulum Gottardum Pontium. 1592. The text has been reprinted in Graevius, Thesaurus Antiquitatum et Historiarum Italiae vol. 2, pt. 2 col. 1337-1362.
- Scritti pubblicati da mons. reverendissimo D. Carlo vescovo di Novara nel governo del suo vescovato dall'anno 1593 fino al 1609. Novara: Girolamo Sessali. 1609.
- Novaria seu de ecclesia Novariensi libri duo. Primus de locis, alter de episcopis. Novariae: apud Hieronymum Sesallum. 1612.
- Historia Ecclesiae Mediolanensis... Liber primus. Novariae: apud Hieronymum Sesallum. 1615.
- Commentarii canonici. Novariae: apud Hieronymum Sesallum. 1615.
- Perinsignes... pro Ecclesia allegationes. In quibus efficacissimis rationibus illius vera libertas et immunitas defenditur. Bologna: apud Haeredes Bartholomaei Cocchi. 1622.
- De Choreis et Spectaculis in festis diebus non exhibendis. Toulouse: J. Boude. 1662.
- C. Annoni, ed. (1839). "Ecclesiastica Mediolanensis historia ab obitu s. Caroli". Documenti spettanti alla storia della s. Chiesa Milanese. Como: Ditta C. Pietro Ostinelli.

== Sources ==
- Chiesa, Innocenzo (1993). Sergio Pagano (ed.). Vita di Carlo Bascapè barnabita e vescovo di Novara (1550-1615). Florence: Olschki. ISBN 978-8822241016.
- Picinelli, Filippo (1670). Ateneo dei letterati milanesi. Milan: Francesco Vigone. pp. 107–9.
- Prodi, Paolo (1965). "BASCAPÈ, Carlo". Dizionario Biografico degli Italiani (in Italian). Vol. 7: Bartolucci–Bellotto. Rome: Institute of the Italian Encyclopaedia. ISBN 978-88-12-00032-6.

Catholic Church titles
Preceded by Pietro Martire Ponzone	Bishop of Novara; 8 February 1593 – 6 October 1615	Succeeded by Ferdinando Taverna
