= Tolomeo Gallio =

Italian Cardinal

- Cardinal-Bishop of Ostia e Velletri
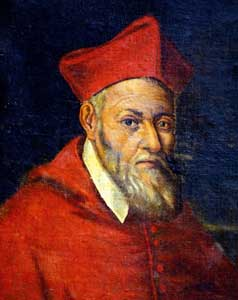
- Church: Catholic Church
- In office: 1603–1607
- Predecessor: Alfonso Gesualdo di Conza
- Successor: Domenico Pinelli

Orders
- Created cardinal: 12 March 1565 by Pope Pius V
- Rank: Cardinal Bishop

Personal details
- Born: 25 September 1527 Cernobbio
- Died: 3 or 4 February 1607 (age 79) Rome, Italy

Tolomeo Gallio (also spelled Gallo and Galli; 25 September 1527 – 3 or 4 February 1607) was an Italian Cardinal.

== Biography ==
In the time of Pope Gregory XIII, he acted as papal secretary of state (in office 1572 to 1585), having a key role in the curia.

He built the Villa d'Este, in his birthplace Cernobbio, in 1568, as a summer residence; and the Palazzo Gallio of Gravedona.

He was bishop of Martirano in 1560, archbishop of Manfredonia in 1562, bishop of Albano in 1587, bishop of Sabina in 1589, bishop of Frascati in 1591, bishop of Porto e Santa Rufina in 1600, bishop of Ostia in 1603.

Tolomeo in 1595 acquired the County of Alvito (later Duchy) in southern Lazio, which he assigned to his nephew Tolomeo; the Gallio family held the fief until 1806.

== Episcopal succession ==
Episcopal succession of Tolomeo Gallio

While bishop, he was the principal consecrator of:

- Cesare Dell'Arena, Bishop of Bitetto (1584);
- Gaspare Visconti, Bishop of Novara (1584);
- Francesco Liparuli (Liparolo), Bishop of Capri (1584);
- Cesare Speciano (Speciani), Bishop of Novara (1584);
- Fulvio Passerini, Bishop of Avellino e Frigento (1591);
- Marsilio Landriani, Bishop of Vigevano (1593);

and the principal co-consecrator of:

- St. Charles Borromeo, Archbishop of Milan (1563); and
- Ippolito Aldobrandini, Pope (1592).
