= Cesare Speciano =

Italian Roman Catholic prelate (1539–1607)

Most Reverend Cesare Speciano
- Bishop of Cremona
- Church: Catholic Church
- Diocese: Diocese of Cremona
- In office: 30 January 1591 – 21 August 1607
- Predecessor: Niccolò Sfondrati
- Successor: Paolo Emilio Sfondrati
- Previous posts: Apostolic Nuncio to the Emperor/Germany (1592-1597); Bishop of Novara (1584-1591); Apostolic Nuncio to Spain (1585-1588)

Orders
- Ordination: 1567
- Consecration: 13 December 1584 by Tolomeo Gallio

Personal details
- Born: 1 September 1539 Cremona, Duchy of Milan
- Died: 21 August 1607 (aged 67) Spoleto, Papal States

Cesare Speciano or Cesare Speciani (1539–1607) was a Roman Catholic prelate who served as Apostolic Nuncio to Emperor (1592–1597), Bishop of Cremona (1591–1607), Apostolic Nuncio to Spain (1585–1588), and Bishop of Novara (1584–1591).

== Biography ==
Cesare Speciano was born in Cremona, Italy on 1 Sep 1539 on ordained a priest in 1567. On 28 November 1584, he was appointed during the papacy of Pope Gregory XIII as Bishop of Novara. On 13 December 1584, he was consecrated bishop by Tolomeo Gallio, Cardinal-Priest of Sant'Agata de' Goti, with Giovanni D'Amato, Bishop Emeritus of Minori, and Paolo Odescalchi, Bishop Emeritus of Penne e Atri, serving as co-consecrators. On 11 December 1585, he was appointed during the papacy of Pope Sixtus V as Apostolic Nuncio to Spain; he resigned from the position on 27 August 1588. On 30 January 1591, he was appointed during the papacy of Pope Gregory XIV as Bishop of Cremona. On 14 May 1592, he was appointed during the papacy of Pope Clement VIII as Apostolic Nuncio to Emperor; he resigned from the position (then known as Apostolic Nuncio to Germany) on 20 June 1597. He served as Bishop of Cremona until his death on 21 August 1607 in Spoleto, Italy.

== Episcopal succession ==
While bishop, he was the principal consecrator of:

- José Anglés, Bishop of Bosa (1587);
- Andrés Pacheco, Bishop of Segovia (1588);
- Zbynék Berka z Dubé a Liepé, Archbishop of Prague (1593); and
- Simon Feuerstein, Titular Bishop of Belline and Auxiliary Bishop of Brixen (1598).

== External links and additional sources ==
- Cheney, David M. "Diocese of Novara". Catholic-Hierarchy.org. (for Chronology of Bishops) ^{[self-published]}
- Chow, Gabriel. "Diocese of Novara (Italy)". GCatholic.org. (for Chronology of Bishops) ^{[self-published]}
- Cheney, David M. "Nunciature to Spain". Catholic-Hierarchy.org. (for Chronology of Bishops) ^{[self-published]}
- Chow, Gabriel. "Apostolic Nunciature Spain". GCatholic.org. (for Chronology of Bishops) ^{[self-published]}
- Cheney, David M. "Nunciature to Emperor (Germany)". Catholic-Hierarchy.org. (for Chronology of Bishops) ^{[self-published]}
- Cheney, David M. "Diocese of Cremona". Catholic-Hierarchy.org. (for Chronology of Bishops) ^{[self-published]}
- Chow, Gabriel. "Diocese of Cremona (Italy)". GCatholic.org. (for Chronology of Bishops) ^{[self-published]}

Catholic Church titles
Preceded by Gaspare Visconti	Bishop of Novara; 1584–1591	Succeeded by Pietro Martire Ponzone
Preceded by Ludovico Taverna	Apostolic Nuncio to Spain; 1585–1588	Succeeded by Annibale Grassi
Preceded by Niccolò Sfondrati	Bishop of Cremona; 1591–1607	Succeeded by Paolo Emilio Sfondrati
Preceded by Camillo Caetani	Apostolic Nuncio to Emperor (1592–1597	Succeeded by Ferdinando Farnese
