= Ferdinando Taverna =

Catholic cardinal

- Bishop of Novara
- Church: Catholic Church
- Diocese: Diocese of Novara
- In office: 16 November 1615 – 29 August 1619
- Predecessor: Carlo Maria Bascapè
- Successor: Ulpiano Volpi
- Other post: Cardinal-Priest of Sant'Eusebio (1604-1619)
- Previous post: Apostolic Collector to Portugal (1596-1598)

Orders
- Consecration: 7 December 1615 by Pope Paul V
- Created cardinal: 9 June 1604 by Pope Clement VIII

Personal details
- Born: 1558 Milan, Duchy of Milan
- Died: 29 August 1619 (aged 60–61) Novara, Duchy of Milan

Ferdinando Taverna (1558 – 29 August 1619) was an Italian Roman Catholic cardinal.

== Biography ==
Born in Milan into a patrician family, Taverna studied canon and civil law in his hometown, obtaining a doctorate and the title of magister. Later, he went to Rome and became referendary of the Tribunals of the Apostolic Signature in 1588. He was named governor of several Papal towns: Viterbo, (1591), (Città di Castello, 1595–1596) and Fermo (vice-governor in 1595–1596). He became Governor of Rome on 30 April 1599, a title which he held until 1604. In that period, he built Villa Parisi.

Taverna was created cardinal priest in the Consistory of 9 June 1604 by Pope Clement VIII, with the title of Sant'Eusebio and participated in the papal conclaves in 1605.

Pope Paul V made him Bishop of Novara in 1615. Taverna died at Novara in 1619 and was buried at the Novara Cathedral.
