= Gravellona =

Gravellona may refer to a pair of Italian municipalities:

- Gravellona Lomellina, in the province of Pavia, Lombardy
- Gravellona Toce, in the province of Verbano-Cusio-Ossola, Piedmont
