= Ernesto Colli (disambiguation) =

Ernesto Colli (1940–1982) was an Italian actor, active mainly during the 1970s.

Ernesto Colli may also refer to:

- Ernesto Colli (tenor) (1866–1928), Italian tenor, active between 1888 and 1910
- Ernesto Colli (priest) (1899–1989), Italian priest and historian, author of works about Lower Novarese and Lomellina
