= Giacomo Filippo Crivelli =

Historical Catholic religious figure

Most Reverend Giacomo Filippo Crivelli
- Bishop of Novara
- Church: Catholic Church
- Diocese: Roman Catholic Diocese of Novara
- In office: 1457–1466
- Predecessor: Bartolomeo Visconti
- Successor: Bernardus de Rubeis

Personal details
- Died: 1466 Novara, Italy

Giacomo Filippo Crivelli (died 1466) was a Roman Catholic prelate who served as Bishop of Novara (1457–1466).

== Biography ==
On 30 May 1457, Giacomo Filippo Crivelli was appointed during the papacy of Pope Callixtus III as Bishop of Novara.' He served as Bishop of Novara until his death in 1466.

While bishop, he was the principal consecrator of Walter Supersaxo, Bishop of Sion (1459).

== External links and additional sources ==
- Cheney, David M. "Diocese of Novara". Catholic-Hierarchy.org. (for Chronology of Bishops) ^{[self-published]}
- Chow, Gabriel. "Diocese of Novara (Italy)". GCatholic.org. (for Chronology of Bishops) ^{[self-published]}

Catholic Church titles
Preceded by Bartolomeo Visconti	Bishop of Novara; 1457–1466	Succeeded by Bernardus de Rubeis
