= Dřevěnice =

- Municipality
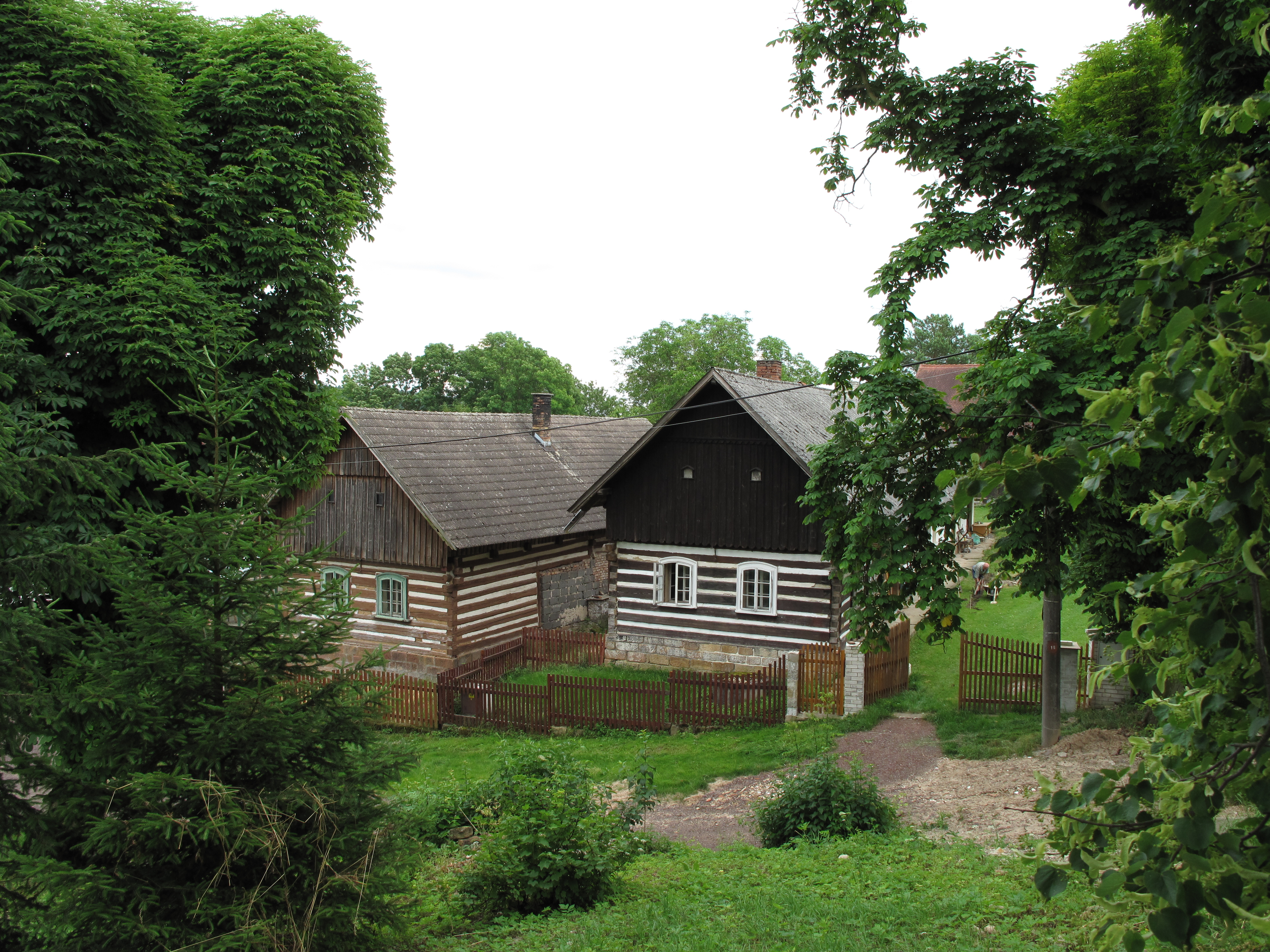
- Log houses

- Flag Coat of arms

- Location in the Czech Republic
- Coordinates: 50°27′8″N 15°26′50″E
- Country: Czech Republic
- Region: Hradec Králové
- District: Jičín
- First mentioned: 1388

Area
  - Total: 5.18 km^{2} (2.00 sq mi)
- Elevation: 310 m (1,020 ft)

Population (2026-01-01)
  - Total: 295
  - Density: 56.9/km^{2} (147/sq mi)
- Time zone: UTC+1 (CET)
  - Summer (DST): UTC+2 (CEST)
- Postal code: 507 13
- Website: www.drevenice.org

Dřevěnice is a municipality and village in Jičín District in the Hradec Králové Region of the Czech Republic. It has about 300 inhabitants.

== Administrative division ==
Dřevěnice consists of two municipal parts (in brackets population according to the 2021 census):

- Dřevěnice (209)
- Dolánky (51)

== Demographics ==
Historical population
| Year | Pop. | ±% |
|---|---|---|
| 1869 | 641 | — |
| 1880 | 652 | +1.7% |
| 1890 | 611 | −6.3% |
| 1900 | 612 | +0.2% |
| 1910 | 578 | −5.6% |
| 1921 | 501 | −13.3% |
| 1930 | 421 | −16.0% |
| 1950 | 317 | −24.7% |
| 1961 | 304 | −4.1% |
| 1970 | 252 | −17.1% |
| 1980 | 223 | −11.5% |
| 1991 | 218 | −2.2% |
| 2001 | 190 | −12.8% |
| 2011 | 226 | +18.9% |
| 2021 | 260 | +15.0% |
Source: Censuses

== Notable people ==
- Zbyněk Berka of Dubá (1551–1606), Archbishop of Prague
