= Giovanni Battista Visconti Aicardi =

Italian Roman Catholic prelate

Most Reverend Giovanni Battista Visconti Aicardi
- Bishop of Novara
- Church: Catholic Church
- Diocese: Diocese of Novara
- In office: 1688–1713
- Predecessor: Giuseppe Maria Maraviglia
- Successor: Giberto Bartolomeo Borromeo

Orders
- Ordination: 4 April 1665
- Consecration: 8 June 1688 by Carlo Pio di Savoia

Personal details
- Born: 1644 Milan, Italy
- Died: 10 August 1713 (aged 68–69) Novara, Italy

Giovanni Battista Visconti Aicardi, B. (1644 – 10 August 1713) was a Roman Catholic prelate who served as Bishop of Novara (1688–1713).

== Biography ==
Giovanni Battista Visconti Aicardi was born in Milan, Italy in 1644 and ordained a priest in the Clerics Regular of Saint Paul on 4 April 1665. On 31 May 1688, he was appointed during the papacy of Pope Innocent XI as Bishop of Novara. On 8 June 1688, he was consecrated bishop by Carlo Pio di Savoia, Cardinal-Bishop of Sabina. He served as Bishop of Novara until his death on 10 August 1713.

== Episcopal succession ==
Episcopal succession of Giovanni Battista Visconti Aicardi

While bishop, he was the principal co-consecrator of:

- Pierre Lambert Ledrou, Titular Bishop of Porphyreon (1692);
- Giovanni Tommaso Rovetta, Bishop of Hvar (1693);
- Innocenzo Migliavacca (Milliavacca), Bishop of Asti (1693);
- Matteo Gagliani, Bishop of Fondi (1693);
- Fernando Manuel de Mejía, Bishop of Zamora (1693);
- Carlo Giuseppe Morozzo, Bishop of Bobbio (1693);
- Giulio Marzi, Auxiliary Bishop of Ostia-Velletri (1693);
- Biagio Gambaro, Bishop of Telese o Cerreto Sannita (1693);
- Bernardino Plastina, Bishop of Oppido Mamertina (1694);
- Francesco Maria Federico Carafa, Bishop of San Marco (1694);
- Juan Alfonso Valerià y Aloza, Bishop of Solsona (1694);
- Eligio Caracciolo, Archbishop of Cosenza (1694);
- Francesco Azzolini, Bishop of Ripatransone (1694);
- Luigi Capuani (Ludovico Capulani), Bishop of Ravello e Scala (1694);
- Emilio Giacomo Cavaliere, Bishop of Troia (1694);
- Valeriano Chierichelli, Bishop of Ferentino (1694);
- Carlo Ottaviano Guasco, Bishop of Alessandria (1695);
- Asdrubale Termini, Bishop of Siracusa (1695);
- Epifanio Fanelli, Bishop of Cefalonia e Zante (1695);
- François Marie Sacco, Bishop of Ajaccio (1695);
- Octavius Spader, Bishop of Arbe (1695);
- Bartolomeo Castelli, Bishop of Mazara del Vallo (1695);
- Giuseppe Maria Borgognini, Bishop of Montalcino (1695);
- Gregorio Compagni, Bishop of Sansepolcro (1696);
- Domenico Belisario de Bellis, Bishop of Molfetta (1696);
- Maioranus Figlioli, Bishop of Caiazzo (1696);
- Giuseppe Schinosi, Bishop of Caserta (1696); and
- Fabrizio Pignatelli, Bishop of Lecce (1696).

== External links and additional sources ==
- Cheney, David M. "Diocese of Novara". Catholic-Hierarchy.org. (for Chronology of Bishops) ^{[self-published]}
- Chow, Gabriel. "Diocese of Novara (Italy)". GCatholic.org. (for Chronology of Bishops) ^{[self-published]}

Catholic Church titles
Preceded by Giuseppe Maria Maraviglia	Bishop of Novara; 1688–1713	Succeeded by Giberto Bartolomeo Borromeo
