= Francesco Gnerre =

Italian essayist (1944–2025)

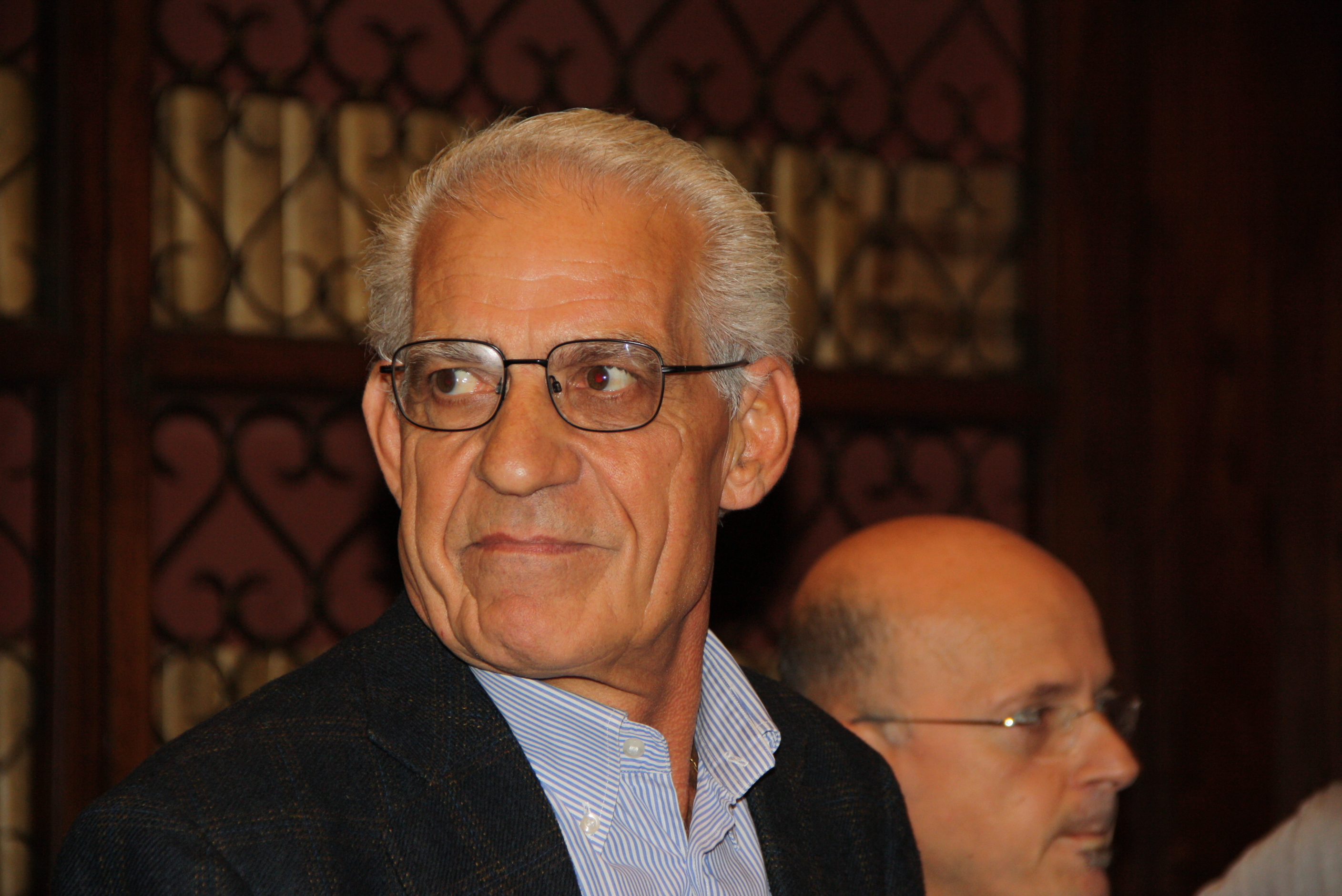
- Born: 17 February 1944; Santa Paolina, Avellino, Italy
- Died: 17 July 2025 (aged 81); Aprilia, Latina, Italy
- Occupations: Essayist, literary critic, sociologist, educator

Francesco Gnerre (17 February 1944 – 17 July 2025) was an Italian essayist, literary critic and sociologist noted for his influential work on homosexuality literature and for his contributions to LGBT cultural discourse in Italy.

== Early life and education ==
Gnerre was born on 17 February 1944 in Santa Paolina, Avellino. In the 1960s, he moved to Rome, where he earned a degree in Literature followed by a degree in Sociology with a specialisation in the sociology of literature.

== Career ==
From 1970, Gnerre taught Italian literature in secondary schools in Rome and authored textbooks, including a commentary on Dante Alighieri’s "Divina Commedia". He also taught Sociology of Communication at a para‑university institute and later offered gender studies courses at the University of Rome Tor Vergata.

His sociology thesis on homosexual characters in post-war Italian narrative was first published in 1981 as "L'eroe negato – Il personaggio omosessuale nella narrativa italiana contemporanea". He later released an expanded edition in 2000, L'eroe negato. Omosessualità e letteratura nel Novecento italiano, through Baldini & Castoldi.

Gnerre edited the compilation "Avventure dell'eros" and contributed to "Dictionnaire des cultures gays et lesbiennes", edited by Didier Eribon. He wrote articles and short essays for publications such as "Gai Pied", "Paese Sera", "Libertaria", "Il manifesto", "Sodoma", "c", and "Liberazione".

From 1998 to 2004, he curated the book review section for the magazine "Babilonia", and continued in a similar editorial role for "Pride", under the direction of Gianni Rossi Barilli.

In 2015, Rogas Edizioni published his essay "La biblioteca ritrovata. Percorsi di lettura gay nel mondo contemporaneo", presenting a comprehensive guide to gay literary and cultural traditions in the contemporary era.

== Death ==
Gnerre died on 17 July 2025 in Aprilia, near Rome, at the age of 81.

== Selected works ==
- Gnerre, Francesco (1981). L’eroe negato – Il personaggio omosessuale nella narrativa italiana contemporanea. Milan: Gammalibri.
- Gnerre, Francesco (1984). Avventure dell’eros. Milan: Gammalibri.
- Gnerre, Francesco (1987). Il testo ritrovato. Forme poetiche e classici a scuola. Ravenna: Longo.
- Gnerre, Francesco (1990). Le forme letterarie nella storia. La letteratura italiana nei sistemi culturali. Turin: SEI.
- Gnerre, Francesco (2000). L’eroe negato. Omosessualità e letteratura nel Novecento italiano. Milan: Baldini & Castoldi.
- Gnerre, Francesco; Leonardi, Gian Pietro (2007). Noi e gli altri. Riflessioni sullo scrivere gay. Milan: Il Dito e La Luna.
- Gnerre, Francesco, ed. (2012). La Divina Commedia. Petrini‑De Agostini.
- Gnerre, Francesco (2015). La biblioteca ritrovata. Percorsi di lettura gay nel mondo contemporaneo. Rome: Rogas Edizioni. ISBN 978-88-94070-35-4.

== Notable articles ==
- Gnerre, Francesco (2 April 2007). "Mario Mieli, una risata contro l'omofobia". Liberazione.
- Gnerre, Francesco (18 April 2011). "Sessualità, responsabilità e cultura. Conversation with Michael Cunningham". Origine.
