= Zbyněk Berka of Dubá =

- Archbishop of Prague
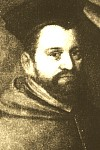
- Zbyněk Berka of Dubá
- Native name: Zbyněk Berka z Dubé
- Church: Catholic Church
- Archdiocese: Archdiocese of Prague
- In office: 21 June 1593 – 6 March 1606
- Predecessor: Martin Medek z Mohelnice
- Successor: Karel z Lamberka
- Other post: Grand Master of the Knights of the Cross with the Red Star (1593-1606)
- Previous post: Administrator of the Regensburg

Orders
- Ordination: 1574
- Consecration: 10 October 1593 by Cesare Speciano

Personal details
- Born: Zbyněk Berka z Dubé a Lipé; 1551 Dřevěnice, Kingdom of Bohemia, Holy Roman Empire
- Died: 6 March 1606 (aged 54–55) Prague, Kingdom of Bohemia, Holy Roman Empire

Zbyněk Berka of Dubá (Czech: Zbyněk Berka z Dubé; 1551 – 6 March 1606) was a Catholic cleric, cardinal and the tenth Archbishop of Prague. He was a member of the Berka of Dubá family. He was grand master of the religious order of Knights of the Cross with the Red Star.

== Biography ==
Zbyněk Berka of Dubá was born in Dřevěnice in 1551, the son of Zdeněk Berka of Dubá and his wife Katharina Haugwitz. Being born into the House of Berka of Dubá, he was a member of the Bohemian nobility.

He was educated with the Jesuits at Prague and Olomouc. He then attended the University of Kraków, where he received a licentiate in theology. Next, he studied at the University of Ingolstadt, receiving a doctorate in theology.

He was ordained as a priest in Prague in 1574. Shortly thereafter, he became a canon of Salzburg Cathedral, St. Vitus Cathedral, Stará Boleslav Cathedral, Olomouc Cathedral, Litoměřice Cathedral, Regensburg Cathedral, and Oetting Cathedral. In 1574, he became provost of the Basilica of St. Peter and St. Paul, and later became provost of Saint Wenceslas Cathedral (1577), Oetting Cathedral (1581), Regensburg Cathedral (1582), and Litoměřice (1587).

In 1578, Pope Gregory XIII named him chamberlain to the pope and a protonotary apostolic. He served as the Apostolic Administrator of the Diocese of Regensburg from 1582 to 1587. He became grand master of the Knights of the Cross with the Red Star in 1590, holding this position until his death.

The cathedral chapter of St. Vitus Cathedral elected Berka of Dubá to be Archbishop of Prague on 21 June 1593. On 10 October 1593, he was consecrated as a bishop by Cesare Speciano, Bishop of Cremona.

On 15 June 1603, Rudolf II, Holy Roman Emperor granted him the title of prince of the Holy Roman Empire.

In 1606, Pope Paul V announced his intention to make Berka of Dubá a cardinal, but Berka of Dubá died before his elevation could take place. He died in Prague on 6 March 1606, and is buried in St. Vitus Cathedral.
