= Pietro Martire Ponzone =

Roman Catholic prelate

Most Reverend Pietro Martire Ponzone
- Bishop of Novara
- Church: Catholic Church
- Diocese: Roman Catholic Diocese of Novara
- In office: 1591–1592
- Predecessor: Cesare Speciano
- Successor: Carlo Bescapè

Personal details
- Died: 19 November 1592 Novara, Italy

Pietro Martire Ponzone (died 1592) was a Roman Catholic prelate who served as Bishop of Novara (1591–1592).

On 8 February 1591, Pietro Martire Ponzone was appointed during the papacy of Pope Gregory XIV as Bishop of Novara. He served as Bishop of Novara until his death on 19 November 1592.

== External links and additional sources ==
- Cheney, David M. "Diocese of Novara". Catholic-Hierarchy.org. (for Chronology of Bishops) ^{[self-published]}
- Chow, Gabriel. "Diocese of Novara (Italy)". GCatholic.org. (for Chronology of Bishops) ^{[self-published]}

Catholic Church titles
Preceded by Cesare Speciano	Bishop of Novara; 1591–1592	Succeeded by Carlo Bescapè
