= Giulio Maria Odescalchi =

Italian Benedictine

Servant of God Giulio Maria Odescalchi OSB
- Bishop of Novara
- Church: Roman Catholic Church
- Diocese: Novara
- See: Novara
- In office: 6 March 1656 - 28 August 1666
- Predecessor: Benedetto Odescalchi
- Successor: Giuseppe Maria Maraviglia

Orders
- Consecration: 19 March 1656 by Benedetto Odescalchi
- Rank: Bishop

Personal details
- Born: Giulio Maria Odescalchi; 1612 Como, Duchy of Milan
- Died: 28 August 1666 (aged 54) Novara, Duchy of Milan
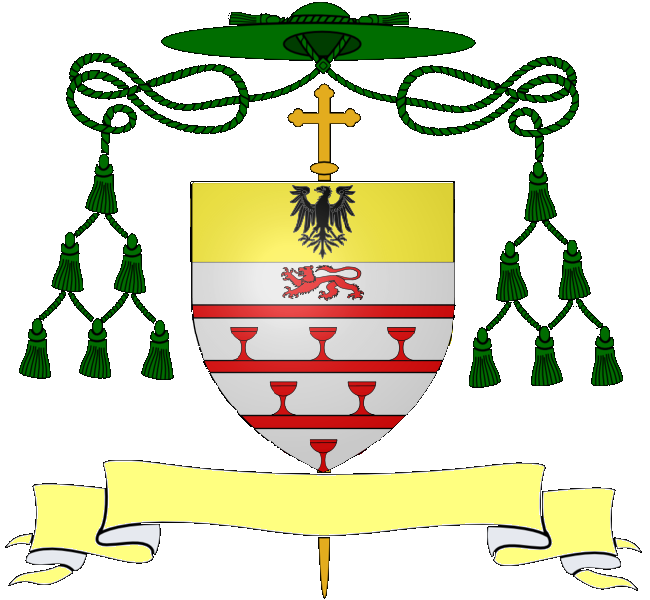
- Coat of arms

Giulio Maria Odescalchi, OSB (1612 – 28 August 1666) was an Italian Benedictine who served as the Bishop of Novara. He was the brother of Pope Innocent XI. The latter opened Odescalchi's beatification process, titling him a Servant of God.

== Life ==
Giulio Maria Odescalchi was born in 1612 in Como to Livio Odescalchi and Paola Castelli Giovanelli. His siblings were Carlo, Lucrezia, Constantino, Nicola and Paolo. His other brother was Benedetto, the future Pope Innocent XI. He is also a relative of Carlo Odescalchi - future Servant of God. His father died in 1626, and his mother died of the plague in 1630.

Pope Alexander VII appointed him as the Bishop of Novara at the behest of Benedetto, who had resigned from that post. Odescalchi served as bishop until his death at the age of 54 in 1666.

== See also ==
- Odescalchi

== External links and additional sources ==
- Cheney, David M. "Diocese of Novara". Catholic-Hierarchy.org. (for Chronology of Bishops) ^{[self-published]}
- Chow, Gabriel. "Diocese of Novara (Italy)". GCatholic.org. (for Chronology of Bishops) ^{[self-published]}

Catholic Church titles
Preceded by Benedetto Odescalchi	Bishop of Novara; 1656–1666	Succeeded by Giuseppe Maria Maraviglia
