= Giuseppe Maria Maraviglia =

Italian Catholic bishop (1617–1684)

Most Reverend Giuseppe Maria Maraviglia
- Bishop of Novara
- Church: Catholic Church
- Diocese: Diocese of Novara
- In office: 1667–1684
- Predecessor: Giulio Maria Odescalchi
- Successor: Giovanni Battista Visconti Aicardi

Orders
- Consecration: 18 December 1667 by Benedetto Odescalchi

Personal details
- Born: 1617 Milan, Italy
- Died: 19 September 1684 (age 67) Novara, Italy

Giuseppe Maria Maraviglia, C.R. (1617 – 19 September 1684) was a Roman Catholic prelate who served as Bishop of Novara (1667–1684).

== Biography ==
Giuseppe Maria Maraviglia was born in Milan, Italy in 1617. On 12 December 1667, during the papacy of Pope Clement IX, he was appointed Bishop of Novara. On 18 December 1667, he was consecrated bishop by Benedetto Odescalchi, Cardinal-Priest of Sant'Onofrio, with Giacomo Altoviti, Titular Patriarch of Antioch, and Carlo Stefano Anastasio Ciceri, Bishop of Alessandria della Paglia, serving as co-consecrators. He served as Bishop of Novara until his death on 19 September 1684.

== External links and additional sources ==
- Cheney, David M. "Diocese of Novara". Catholic-Hierarchy.org. (for Chronology of Bishops) ^{[self-published]}
- Chow, Gabriel. "Diocese of Novara (Italy)". GCatholic.org. (for Chronology of Bishops) ^{[self-published]}

Catholic Church titles
Preceded by Giulio Maria Odescalchi	Bishop of Novara; 1667–1684	Succeeded by Giovanni Battista Visconti Aicardi
