= Ernesto Colli (priest) =

Italian priest and historian

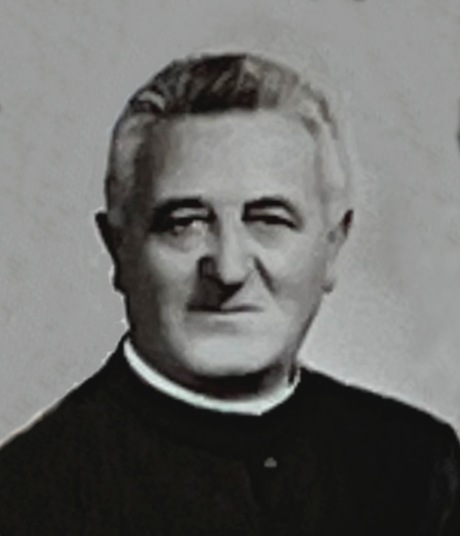
- Born: 1 April 1899; Gravellona Lomellina
- Died: 29 September 1989 (aged 90); Galliate
- Citizenship: Italian
- Occupations: priest, historian
- Known for: works on the history of Lower Novarese

Ernesto Colli (born April 1, 1899, dead September 29, 1989) was an Italian priest and historian, known for his works on Lower Novarese.

== Biography ==
Son of Battista and Maria Anna Cusaro, he had three older siblings: Giuseppe, Luisa and Carolina. He was also the cousin of Lino Cassani, with whom he collaborated in the writing of several works.

He was conscripted in 1917, during World War I, and discharged in 1920. This made of him a ragazzo del '99 (boy of '99 (Note: After the defeat at Caporetto (October 24, 1917), the Italian army was weakened, so young men born in 1899 were conscripted before they turned eighteen, hastily trained, and sent to the front starting in November 1917. By restoring the strength and confidence of the Italian army, they contributed decisively to victory, often at the cost of their lives.)) – he was later a member of the related national association I Ragazzi del '99.

In 1920 he lost his father, aged 56, to the after-effects of Spanish flu.

He was ordained a priest on July 6, 1924, and celebrated his first mass in Gravellona Lomellina the following Sunday. He later became assistant parish priest in Vespolate (1925–1928) and parish priest in Mergozzo (1929–1941) and in Nibbiola (1942–1989).

In 1952 he lost his mother, aged 80.

He was a member of the Società Storica Novarese (the Novara Historical Society), in whose magazine he published an article on Vespolate castle in 1982.

He died on September 29, 1989, in Galliate and was buried in Nibbiola.

== Works ==
Ernesto Colli has published numerous volumes on the history of the towns of the Lower Novarese and Lomellina, with an extremely simple and linear style.

His works range from local history to customs and folklore. To compose them, he visited every village, consulted the municipal and parish archives, and interviewed the inhabitants themselves, over a period of over for decades. In this way, important figures, the origins of places, the events of noble families, and the forgotten works of art in churches and country chapels were brought back to common knowledge.

As proof of the relevance of these works, several elementary schools have adopted them as textbooks.

=== Monographs on villages ===
- Mergozzo nella sua storia, Tip. Cattaneo, Novara, 1933
- Mergozzo nella sua storia - Opuscolo secondo, Arti Grafiche Airoldi, Intra, 1935
- Memorie storiche di Garbagna Novarese, with Lino Cassani, Tip. Pietro Riva e C., Novara, 1948
- Nibbiola nella sua storia, Tip. San Gaudenzio, Novara, 1952
- Vespolate nella sua storia, with Lino Cassani, Tip. Provera, Novara, 1956
- Gravellona Lomellina nella sua storia, Tip. San Gaudenzio, Novara, 1960
- Barbavara di Gravellona Lomellina, Tip. La Moderna, Novara, 1964
- Tornaco e Vignarello nella loro storia, Tip. F.lli Paltrinieri, Novara, 1967
- Villanova di Cassolo nel quarto centenario della nascita di S. Luigi Gonzaga - 1568-1968, Tip. F.lli Paltrinieri, Novara, 1968
- Dott. Comm. Mons. Carlo Fusi e Terdobbiate, Tip. San Gaudenzio, Novara, 1970
- Olengo di Novara nella sua storia, with Gino Giarda, Tip. San Gaudenzio, Novara, 1973
- Vespolate nella sua storia - Secondo volume, with Guido Longhi, Tip. San Gaudenzio, Novara, 1988

=== Other works ===
- Primo decennio dell'Asilo (1962-1972) - Tradizioni di S. Caterina V. e M., Tip. San Gaudenzio, Novara, 1972
- Garbagna, Nibbiola, Vespolate, Borgolavezzaro - Spunti di storia per le scuole medie - Le mie memorie, Tip. San Gaudenzio, Novara, 1978
- Nobis in ARCA navigare oportuit, with Eugenio Manni, Novara, 1981
- Il Castello-Rocca di Vespolate, Tip. La Cupola, Novara, 1982 (extracted from the article on the Bollettino Storico per la Provincia di Novara of the same year)
- Vespolate Mergozzo Nibbiola, Tip. San Gaudenzio, Novara, 1985
- Cronistoria della parrocchia B. V. Assunta in S. Caterina V. M., manuscript 1942–1989

== Honors ==
Cavaliere dell'Ordine di Vittorio Veneto - ribbon for ordinary uniform

Knight of the Order of Vittorio Veneto
"For recognized combat merits"
— 26 maggio 1973

== Legacy ==
The municipality of Nibbiola named the nursery school after him on 22 August 2011. Still in Nibbiola, a street bears his name.

Various articles were dedicated to him, including one in the magazine of the National Association I Ragazzi del '99 in 1973 and one in the magazine of the Società Storica Novarese in 2002.

== Bibliography ==
- Colli, Ernesto (1978). "Le mie memorie" [My memoirs]. Garbagna, Nibbiola, Vespolate, Borgolavezzaro - Spunti di storia per le scuole medie - Le mie memorie [Garbagna, Nibbiola, Vespolate, Borgolavezzaro - History notes for middle school students - My memoirs] (in Italian). Novara: Tip. San Gaudenzio. pp. 107–148 – via Foto Emilio Alzati.
- "Un "Ragazzo" che si fa onore e che onora la nostra classe" [A «Boy» who does himself proud and who honors our class]. Il Tascapane (in Italian). Associazione Nazionale «Ragazzi del '99». 1973., insert «La Domenica del Corriere».
- Rossari, Maria Cristina (2002). "Una singolare figura di curato (don E. Colli)" [An unusual kind of priest (Don E. Colli)]. Bollettino Storico per la provincia di Novara (in Italian) (1). Novara: Società Storica Novarese: 249–288.
