= Santa Paolina =

- Comune
- Comune di Santa Paolina
- Location within Italy Location within Campania
- Coordinates: 41°2′N 14°51′E
- Country: Italy
- Region: Campania
- Province: Avellino (AV)
- Frazioni: Castelmozzo, Marotta, Picoli, Passo Serra, Petrarola, Ponte Zeza, Sala, Santa Lucia, Viturano

Area
  - Total: 8 km^{2} (3.1 sq mi)
- Elevation: 550 m (1,800 ft)

Population (1 April 2009)
  - Total: 1,457
  - Density: 180/km^{2} (470/sq mi)
- Demonym: Santapaolinari
- Time zone: UTC+1 (CET)
  - Summer (DST): UTC+2 (CEST)
- Postal code: 83030
- Dialing code: 0825
- ISTAT code: 064093
- Patron saint: Santa Paolina (Roman martyr of the 3rd century)
- Saint day: 6 June
- Website: http://www.comunesantapaolina.gov.it

Santa Paolina is a small comune (municipality) of the province of Avellino, in the region of Campania, Italy. It has a population of 1,360 as of 2014, down from 2,487 in 1951.

== History ==
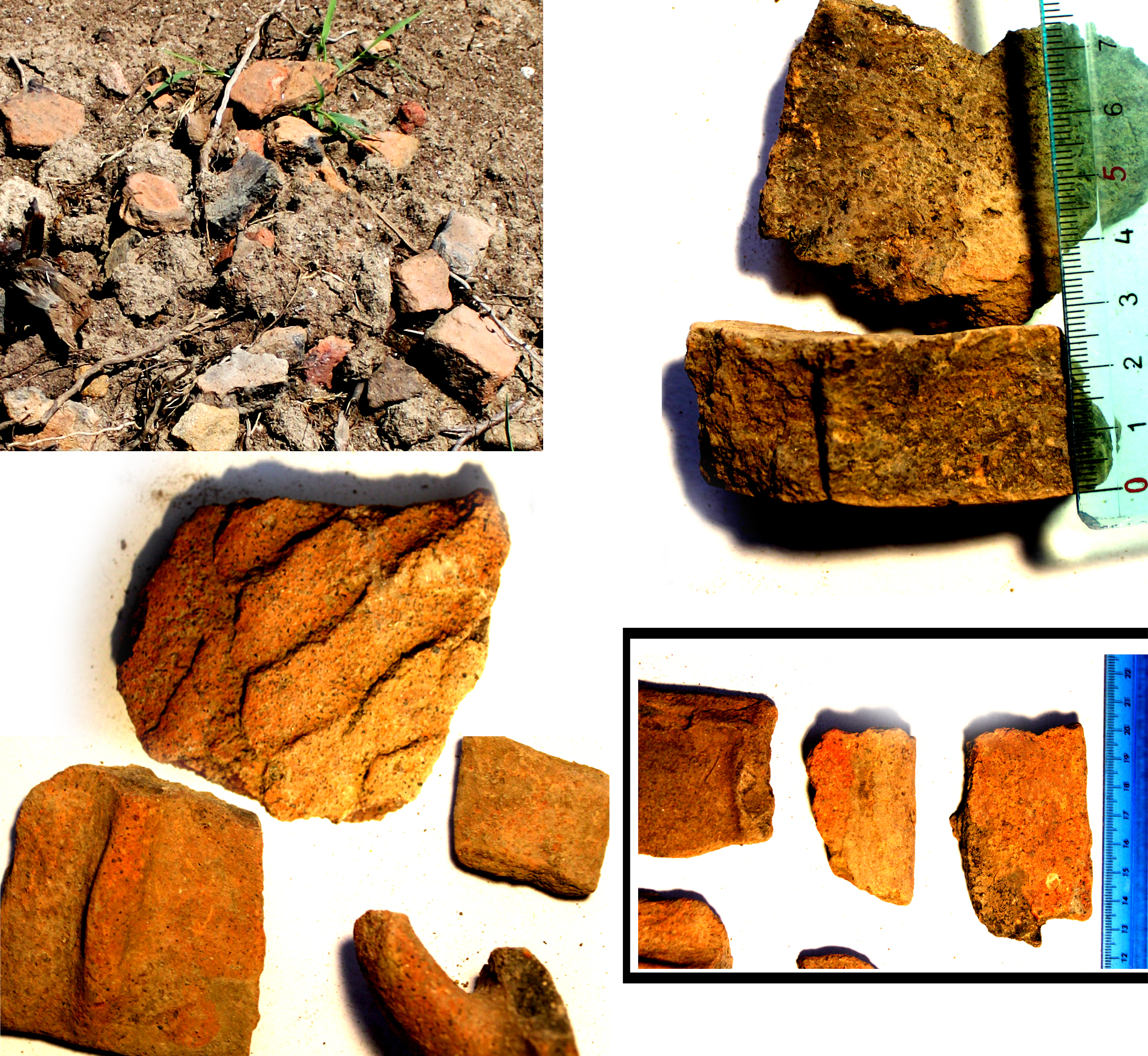
Archaeological finds from the 9th century BC, discovered by Isaac Luongo in the countryside of Santa Paolina (AV), Italy.

The area surrounding Santa Paolina was frequented by prehistoric men in the Neolithic age. Archaeological findings reveal the presence of a civilization of the Irpinian people in the valley at the foot of Mount San Felice in the 9th century BC. Living in the area around the streams Orsi, Sant'Egidio, Marotta, and Picoli, this settlement of Irpinian people produced decorated pottery and various tools. The discovery of fragments of an old and large furnace shows that this region was the source of elaborate craftsmanship as early as the late Neolithic age. The products manufactured in these factories before the Roman empire were likely traded or sold along the ancient trade routes linking this site to the ancient "civitates" typical of the ancient civilizations of Hirpines and Japyges situated behind the hills, along the valleys and near the rivers inland, at the roots of Apennines mountains and located in the mid-south of Italy.

In medieval times the central land and that of the surrounding districts were mostly used for agricultural purposes, as detailed in a text from the Lombard abbey of St. Sophia, written in the year 1041. This text refers to the site in question as a "promised land" placed at the end of a path, at the edge of a deep forest, and near a natural spring, all of which were directly controlled by the Lombard abbey. The name Santa Paolina first appears in 1083, and around 1270, the comune is reported in the inventory of the Abbey of St. Sofia as:(Latin) ... Castrum Vetus Sancte Pauline .... Other sources already reference (Latin)... Castrum Vetus et Timplani ... near Tufo (little Irpinian village) in 1239, and this name refers to the same location mentioned in the text of St. Sophia during the year 1270. Here, the land was named after the "Templano" family, who originated from Grottaminarda. This finding was also confirmed in the long list of countries mentioned by the Bishop of Avellino "Francesco", when he was interrogated by the Curia of Naples on the plague of "peste" which occurred in the year 1296.

The territory, in recent history was divided into several districts:

The square (La Piazza), the court of Brecciale and via Ferrere, the fortress of Petrarola Square and Via San Rocco "Pino", Capi Jorii, Giallonati, Marotta, "Cierro", San Bernardino, La Sala, Profiche, Saint Lucia, Piana de' Sauri, Casale Castelmozzo, Paoloni, Piezzo, Picoli, the court of Bridge Zeza (Manganelli), Taverna Figura, Serra (Tufini), and Gnerri Viturano.

=== Population History ===
Year	1951	1961	1971	1981	1991	2001	2011	2014
Population	2,487	2,009	1,700	1,708	1,410	1,432	1,366	1,360
