= Giovanni Visconti =

Giovanni Visconti may refer to:

- John of Gallura (died 1275), or Giovanni Visconti, Judge of Gallura, Sardinian ruler
- Giovanni Visconti (bishop), Roman Catholic prelate and alleged cardinal-bishop of Sabina
- Giovanni Visconti (Archbishop of Milan) (1290–1354), Milanese archbishop
- Giovanni Visconti (cyclist) (born 1983), Italian professional road racing cyclist
- Giovanni Battista Visconti (1722–1784), Italian archaeologist and museum curator
