= Bartolomeo Visconti =

Most Reverend Bartolomeo Visconti
- Bishop of Novara
- Church: Catholic Church
- Diocese: Roman Catholic Diocese of Novara
- In office: 1429–1457
- Predecessor: Pietro Filargis
- Successor: Giacomo Filippo Crivelli

Personal details
- Born: 1402
- Died: 28 April 1457 (age 55) Novara, Italy

Bartolomeo Visconti or Bartolomeo Aicardi Visconti (died 1457) was a Roman Catholic prelate who served as Bishop of Novara (1429–1457).

== Biography ==
Bartolomeo Visconti was born in 1402. On 4 November 1429, he was appointed during the papacy of Pope Martin V as Bishop of Novara. He served as Bishop of Novara until his death on 28 April 1457.

While bishop, he was the principal co-consecrator of Carlo Gabriele Sforza, Archbishop of Milan (1454).

== External links and additional sources ==
- Cheney, David M. "Diocese of Novara". Catholic-Hierarchy.org. (for Chronology of Bishops) ^{[self-published]}
- Chow, Gabriel. "Diocese of Novara (Italy)". GCatholic.org. (for Chronology of Bishops) ^{[self-published]}

Catholic Church titles
Preceded by Pietro Filargis	Bishop of Novara; 1429–1457	Succeeded by Giacomo Filippo Crivelli
