= Società Storica Novarese =

Association of historical studies established in Novara in 1920

- Abbreviation: SSN
- Predecessor: Società Archeologica per il Museo Patrio Novarese
- Formation: May 20, 1920; 105 years ago
- Founded at: Hall of honor of the Civic Museum (at Palazzo Orelli, at that time)
- Type: Nonprofit
- Tax ID no.: 80010630038
- Legal status: association
- Purpose: cultural
- Location: Novara, IT
- Coordinates: 45.4447834°N 8.6282974°E
- Region served: Province of Novara
- Official language: Italian
- President: Paolo Cirri
- Publication: Bollettino Storico per la Provincia di Novara
- Website: www.ssno.it

Società Storica Novarese (SSN; English: Novara Historical Society) is an association for historical studies founded in Novara in 1920. Its core activity is the publication of Bollettino Storico per la Provincia di Novara ("Historical Bulletin for the Province of Novara"), which features articles on local history, archaeology, and art.

== History ==
The original idea of the Società Storica Novarese dates back to a project for an archaeological museum by Gaetano Morbio (father of the more famous historian Carlo) in 1813, which materialized in the Società Archeologica per il Museo Patrio Novarese (Archaeological Society for the Novarese National Museum) in 1874. In 1890 the society was dissolved and all the heritage of collected finds and objects, with the attached historical archive, was entrusted to the municipality, under the direction of Giovanni Battista Morandi.

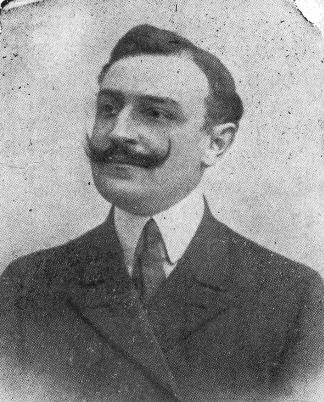
Giovan Battista Morandi, inspirer of the Società and first director of Bollettino

In the autumn of 1915, Morandi died on the Karst Plateau front. His circle of friends, led by Alessandro Viglio and Lino Cassani, formed a committee in January 1919 to establish a society, named after him and independent of any political party, with the aim of encouraging studies of local history. The Società Storica Novarese was thus born on May 20, 1920. The chosen information outlet was the Bollettino Storico per la Provincia di Novara, whose publication had been initiated by Morandi himself in 1907, and which over time became a point of reference for the entire field of local history.

Foundation and first board of directors
- In the hall of honor of the Civic Museum, at that time located in Palazzo Orelli, On May 20, 1920, a meeting of twenty-two scholars and experts in local history took place, which marked the birth of Società Storica Novarese. After the formalities, the first board of directors was elected from among those present, consisting primarily of figures with numerous contributions and publications on the history of the Novara area: Antonio Tadini as president, Ettore Silva as vice president, Alessandro Viglio as editor of the Bollettino, Lino Cassani as treasurer, Oreste Scarzello as secretary, Giuseppe Bronzini, Guido Bustico, Marco Caccia di Romentino, Arturo Costa, Stefano Ferrara, Giuseppe Lampugnani, Rinaldo Lampugnani, and Antonio Massara as directors.

Those years of activity saw the promotion of the restoration of the Broletto and various churches, such as Santa Maria d'Ingalardo, the Madonna del Latte of Gionzana, and Santa Maria delle Grazie. The attempted demolition of San Giovanni Decollato, the two toll houses of the Barriera Albertina, and the Visconti-Sforza Castle were foiled. The donation of Alfredo Giannoni's modern art collection to the municipality, which took place in 1930, was facilitated.

On August 6, 1935, the Ministry of National Education ordered the dissolution of the board of directors and the Society became dependent on the Regia Deputazione di Storia Patria (Royal Deputation of National History). At the same time, the Bollettino was renamed Bollettino della Sezione Novarese della Regia Deputazione di Storia Patria (Bulletin of the Novara Section of the Royal Deputation of National History), a name that, however, avoided its suppression established by the Ministry of the Press and Propaganda in order to reduce the importation of newsprint.

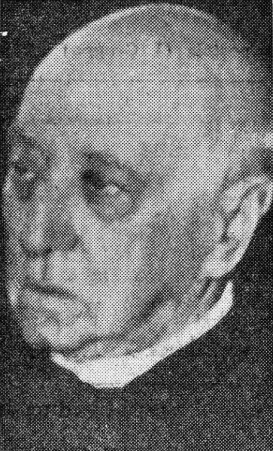
Lino Cassani, one of the founders

After the Second World War, on 28 June 1946 the general assembly was held, during which Lino Cassani advocated (and obtained) the reinstatement of the original Società Storica Novarese, accompanied by its own Bollettino (suspended between 1943 and 1945).

== Bollettino Storico per la Provincia di Novara ==
It is the official publication of the association, often abbreviated with acronym BSPN in bibliographic references.

The first issue was published in January/February 1907, edited by Giovanni Battista Morandi, when Società Storica Novarese did not yet exist. Publication was suspended only between 1943 and 1945, during the Second World War, and continues to this day (2025).

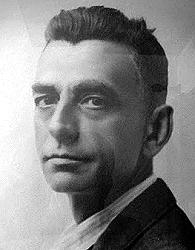
Alessandro Viglio, one of the founders and director of Bollettino after Morandi

A statistical note, which gives a sense of the size of the magazine: in December 2012 there were 444 authors, for a total of 1629 articles, whose average length is 20 pages.

Publication in the Bollettino is open to anyone, not just members. Texts must meet specific requirements and are evaluated by a scientific committee.

The Bollettino also features noteworthy degree theses on local history and culture. Between the 1980s and the early 2000s, over forty theses were featured in the Thesis section. About ten of these were published more extensively in the Bollettino itself, and some have even given rise to independent publications.

Great importance is also given to in-depth studies on the architectural heritage of the city and the territory, to which four monographs have been dedicated over the years:

- Carlo Nigra (1921). La casa Della Porta in Novara [The Della Porta House in Novara] (in Italian);
- Alessandro Viglio (1928). L'antico Palazzo del Comune di Novara e gli edifici minori del Broletto [The Old Town Hall of Novara and the Minor Buildings of the Broletto] (in Italian);
- Oreste Scarzello (1931). Il Museo Lapidario della Canonica e gli antichi monumenti epigrafici di Novara [The Lapidary Museum of the Canonica and the Ancient Epigraphic Monuments of Novara] (in Italian);
- Paolo Verzone (1932–1937). L'Architettura Romanica nel Novarese [Romanesque Architecture in the Novara Area] (in Italian).

== See also ==
- List of historical societies in Italy

== Bibliography ==
- Elena Lunghi (2007). "1907-2007 - Il Bollettino Storico ha 100 anni" [1907-2007 - The Historical Bulletin is 100 years old] (PDF). Bollettino Storico per la Provincia di Novara (in Italian) (1). Novara: Società Storica Novarese: 7–26. ISSN 0392-1107.
