= Diocese of Novara =

Roman Catholic diocese in Italy

Diocese of Novara Dioecesis Novariensis

Catholic
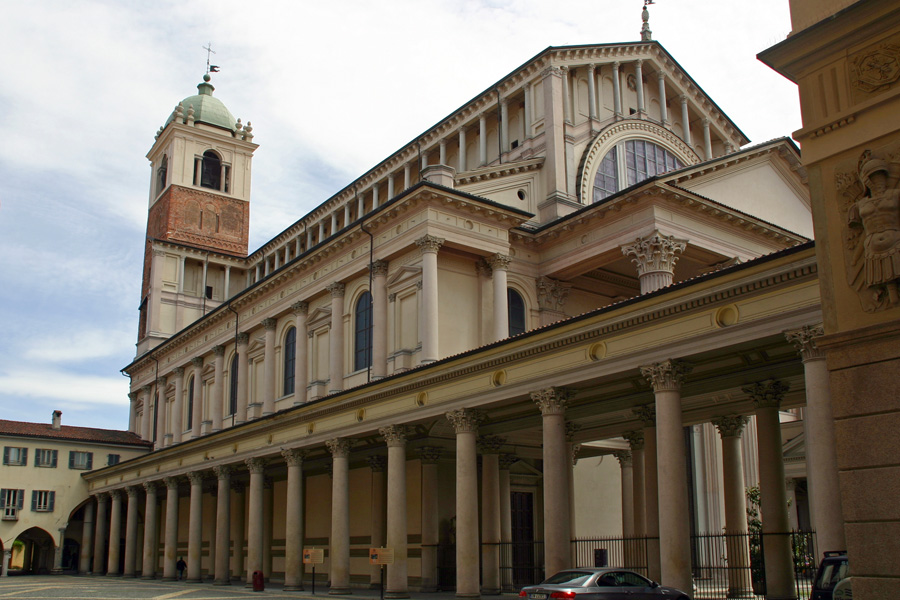
- Novara Cathedral

Location
- Country: Italy
- Ecclesiastical province: Vercelli

Statistics
- Area: 4,283 km^{2} (1,654 sq mi)
- Population: Total; Catholics: (as of 2023); 559,400 (est.) ▼; 518,600 (est.) ▼
- Parishes: 336 ▼

Information
- Denomination: Catholic Church
- Rite: Roman Rite
- Established: 4th century
- Cathedral: Cattedrale di S. Maria Assunta
- Secular priests: 256 (diocesan) ▼63 (Religious Orders) ▼19 Permanent Deacons ▼

Current leadership
- Pope: Leo XIV
- Bishop: Franco Giulio Brambilla

Map

Website
- www.diocesinovara.it

The Diocese of Novara (Latin: Dioecesis Novariensis) is a Latin Church diocese of the Catholic Church in the Piedmont region of northwest Italy. It is a suffragan of the Archdiocese of Vercelli.

== History ==
According to the hagiographical "Life of Gaudentius", written c. 700, he was born in Ivrea, and came to Novara, where a priest named Laurentius was preaching and baptizing. When Laurentius was killed, he took up the task of catechizing, with the blessing of Bishop Eusebius of Vercelli, in whose territory Novara was situated. There he was noticed as a future episcopal candidate by Bishop Ambrose of Milan during a visit to Novara. Gaudentius was consecrated a bishop by Ambrose's successor, Bishop Simplicianus (397–401). He served in Novara for twenty years.

In 972, the Holy Roman Emperor Otto I granted the dominium of the town of Novara and twenty-four miles surrounding the town to Bishop Aupaldo and his successors, the Bishops of Novara. The bishops therefore enjoyed the title of Count as well as the same rights as a Count of the Empire.

In 1059, Pope Nicholas II summoned the archbishop of Milan and his suffragans to attend his synod, which met in Rome in April. Among the suffragan bishops who attended was Bishop Oddo of Novara.

In 1352, Bishop Guilelmo Amidano (1342–1355) had all of the regulations concerning the Chapter of Novara collected and arranged in a single volume.

In 1394 and 1395, Bishop Pietro Filargi successfully negotiated with King Wenceslaus IV of Bohemia, the King of Rome, the recognition of Gian Galeazzo Visconti as Imperial Vicar and the first Duke of Milan. King Wenceslaus also granted Bishop Pietro of Novara the title of Princeps Sacri Imperii.

Novara lost part of its territory on 16 March 1530, when Pope Clement VII established the Diocese of Vigevano.

Giovanni Antonio Serbelloni, Cardinal of S. Giorgio in velabro, Bishop of Novara, did not attend the First Provincial Council of Milan on 14 October 1565, under the presidency of Cardinal Carlo Borromeo, Archbishop of Milan. Bishop Romolo Archinto (1574–1576) attended the Fourth Provincial Synod of Milan in 1576, and signed the decrees. Bishop Pomponio Cotta (1577–1579) attended and subscribed the decrees of the Fifth Provincial Synod of Milan in March 1579. Bishop Francesco Bossi (1579–1583) was unable to attend the Sixth Provincial Synod of Milan in May 1582, but sent his Vicar General, Giovanni Paolo Albergono, as his procurator. Bishop Carlo Bescapè (1593–1615) was present at the Seventh Provincial Synod of Milan in May 1609 and subscribed the decrees.

=== Synods ===
A diocesan synod was an irregularly held, but important, meeting of the bishop of a diocese and his clergy. Its purpose was (1) to proclaim generally the various decrees already issued by the bishop; (2) to discuss and ratify measures on which the bishop chose to consult with his clergy; (3) to publish statutes and decrees of the diocesan synod, of the provincial synod, and of the Holy See.

Bishop Oldrado (1356–ca. 1388) presided over a diocesan synod in the cathedral of Novara on 3 January 1365.

On 9 May 1568, Cardinal Giovanni Antonio Serbelloni (1560–1574) held a diocesan synod. Bishop Cesare Speciano (1584–1591) presided over a diocesan synod in 1590.

A diocesan synod was held by Bishop Giulio Maria Odescalchi (1656–1666) in 1660. A synod was held in 1674 by Bishop Giuseppe Maria Maraviglia (1667–1684), and another in 1675.

Bishop Giovanni Battista Visconti (1688–1713) presided over a diocesan synod on 6–8 July 1707. Bishop Marco Aurelio Balbis Bertone (1757–1789) held a diocesan synod on 1–3 July 1778.

Cardinal Giuseppe Morozzo Della Rocca (1817–1842) presided over a diocesan synod in Novara on 11–13 July 1826. In August 1856, Synodical Statutes of the diocese of Novara were issued under the auspices of Bishop Giacomo Filippo Gentile (1843–1875). Bishop Edoardo Pulciano (1892 –1901) held a diocesan synod on 4–6 September 1900. A diocesan synod was held by Bishop Giuseppe Castelli (1924–1943) on 9–11 September 1936. On 20–22 October 1955, Bishop Gilla Vincenzo Gremigni (1951–1963) held a diocesan synod.

=== French occupation ===
On 17 March 1805, the Emperor Napoleon established the Kingdom of Italy, and had himself crowned its king, on 23 May, in the cathedral of Milan by Cardinal Giovanni Battista Caprara, the papal legate. Novara became part of the kingdom, and was made the capital of a "department" called Agogna. When Napoleon abdicated in 1814, the kingdom came to an end, and Milanese territory was occupied by the Austrians. The Kingdom of Sardinia was restored by the Congress of Vienna in 1815. It included Novara.

Back in power, King Victor Emmanuel I of Sardinia requested Pope Pius VII, who had also returned to the restored Papal States, to restore the dioceses in the Piedmont. On 17 July 1817, the pope issued the bull "Beati Petri", which reconstituted de novo the ten dioceses which had been suppressed under the French. In addition, the pope created a new ecclesiastical province and elevated the diocese of Vercelli to the rank of metropolitan archdiocese, with the dioceses of Alessandria, Biella, and Casale as suffragans.

Upon further consideration and consultation with ecclesiastical authorities in Milan, Pius VII chose to make additional adjustments. In an apostolic letter to Cardinal Paolo Giuseppe Solaro, "Cum Per Nostras" (26 September 1817), he authorized the cardinal to remove two dioceses from the jurisdiction of the metropolitan archbishop of Milan, and transfer the diocese of Novara to the ecclesiastical province of Vercelli, in the Kingdom of Sardinia.

== Bishops ==
=== to 800 ===
- Gaudentius of Novara (398 – 417)
- Agapitus (Agabio) (ca. 417–ca. 447)
- Diogenes

Laurentius

- Pascentius
- Simplici(an)us (subscribed in 451)
- Victor
- Pagatianus
- Honoratus
- Opilius
- Ambrosius
- Filacrius (537–553)
- Agnellus
- Spectabilis
- Marcellus
- Severus
- Lupicinus
- Probinus
- Vigilius
- Flavinus (Flavianus)
- Panfronio
- Gratianus (subscribed in 680)
- Probus
- Aureolus
- Leo
- Ambrosius
- Gratiosus (died 729)
- Benedictus
- Petrus
- Sicardus
- Tito Levita

=== 800 to 1030 ===
- Attone (attested in 829)
- Adalgisius (attested in 835, 842 and 848)
- Dodo (Dodone) (ca. 849–859)
- Druttemiro (attested in 864 and 867)
- Notingus (attested 878–879)
- Lambertus (c. 880–881)
- Ernustus (attested 882)
- Chadultus (attested 882–890)
- Liutherius (attested 892)
- Garibaldus (attested 898–902)
- Dagibertus (attested 919)
- Rodulfus (attested 946–955)
- Petrus (attested 963)
- Aupaldus (attested 965–991)
- Petrus (attested 996–1028)

=== 1030 to 1300 ===
- Gualbertus (c. 1032–1039)
- Riprandus (1039–1053)
- Oddo (1054–1079)
- Albertus (1079–1083)
- Anselmus (1083–after 1098)

Sede Vacante (1100–1110)

- Eppo (1110–1117)
- Riccardus (1117–1122)
- Litifredus (1122–1151)

Sede vacante (1151–1153)

- Guilelmus Tornielli (1153–1161)
- Guilelmus Faleto (1162–1170)
- Bonifacius (1172–1191)
- Ottone
- Pietro (1197–1209)
- Gerardo da Sesso, O. Cist. (1209 – 1211)
- Odelbert Tornielli (1213–1235)
- Odemar Busio (1235–1250)
- Sigebaldus Caballazio (Cavallazzi) (1250-1270)

Sede Vacante (1270?–1287)
[Guido (da Pincio) (1272–1279)] Intrusus

- Englesius Caballazio (Cavallazzi), O.Min. (1287–1291)
- Papinianus della Rovere (1296–1300)

=== 14th-17th centuries ===
- Bartolomeo Querini (1303 – 1304)
- Uguccione Borromeo (1304 – 1329)
- Giovanni Visconti (1 Aug 1331 – 1342)
- Guilelmo Amidano, O.E.S.A. (17 July 1342 – 29 January 1355)
- Oldrado (1356–ca. 1388)
- Pietro Filargis, O.F.M. (1389 – 1402) Roman Obedience
- Bartolomeo Visconti (4 Nov 1429 – 1457 Died)
- Giacomo Filippo Crivelli (30 May 1457 – 1466 Died)
- Bernardus de Rubeis (1466–1468)
- Giovanni Ardcimboldi (1468 – 1484)
  - Ascanio Maria Sforza, in commendam (25 Oct 1484 – 18 Apr 1485 Resigned)
- Gerolamo Pallavicini (18 Apr 1485 – 18 Aug 1503 Died)
- Cardinal Federico di Sanseverino (1505-1511) Apostolic Administrator
- Cardinal Matthäus Schiner (6 Feb 1512 – 1516 Resigned)
- Cardinal Antonio Maria Ciocchi del Monte (19 Apr 1516 – 20 Dec 1525 Resigned)
- Ermete Stampa (20 Dec 1525 – 1526)
- Giovanni Angelo Arcimboldi (1526 – 1550)
- Cardinal Ippolito d'Este (II) (19 Mar 1550 – 18 Nov 1551 Resigned) Administrator

Cardinal Giulio della Rovere (1551 – 1552 Resigned) Administrator

- Cardinal Giovanni Gerolamo Morone (12 Sep 1552 – 13 Mar 1560 Resigned)
- Cardinal Giovanni Antonio Serbelloni (13 Mar 1560 – 1574 Resigned)
- Romolo Archinto (26 Apr 1574 – 4 Sep 1576 Died)
- Gerolamo Ragazzoni (19 Sep 1576 – 19 Jul 1577 Appointed, Bishop of Bergamo)
- Pomponio Cotta (19 Jul 1577 – 11 Sep 1579 Died)
- Francesco Bossi (21 Oct 1579 – 18 Sep 1583 Died)
- Gaspare Visconti (5 Nov 1584 – 1584)
- Cesare Speciano (Speciani) (28 Nov 1584 – 30 Jan 1591 Appointed, Bishop of Cremona)
- Pietro Martire Ponzone (8 Feb 1591 – 19 Nov 1592 Died)
- Carlo Bascapè, B. (8 Feb 1593 – 6 Oct 1615 Died)

=== 17th-19th centuries ===
- Cardinal Ferdinando Taverna (16 Nov 1615 – 29 Aug 1619)
- Ulpiano Volpi (1619 – 1629)
- Giovanni Pietro Volpi (10 Mar 1629 – 12 Sep 1636 Died)
- Antonio Tornielli (15 Dec 1636 – 8 Mar 1650 Died)
- Benedetto Odescalchi (4 Apr 1650 – 6 Mar 1656 Resigned)
- Giulio Maria Odescalchi, O.S.B. (6 Mar 1656 – 28 Aug 1666 Died)
- Giuseppe Maria Maraviglia, C.R. (12 Dec 1667 – 19 Sep 1684 Died)
  - Celestino Sfondrati
- Giovanni Battista Visconti Aicardi, B. (31 May 1688 – 10 Aug 1713 Died)
- Giberto Bartolomeo Borromeo (17 Jan 1714 – 22 Jan 1740 Died)
- Bernardino Ignazio d'Asti (Rovere de Cortanze), O.F.M. Cap. (1741 – 1747)
- Giovanni Battista Baratta, C.O. (1748)
- Ignazio Rovèro (15 Jul 1748 – 10 Sep 1756 Died)
- Marco Aurelio Balbis Bertone (3 Jan 1757 – 17 May 1789 Died)
- Carlo Luigi Buronzo del Signore (26 Sep 1791 – 24 Jul 1797 Confirmed, Archbishop of Turin)
- Vittorio Filippo Melano di Portula, O.P. (24 Jul 1797 – 23 Dec 1813 Died)

=== 19th century and later ===
- Cardinal Giuseppe Morozzo Della Rocca (1817 – 1842)
- Giacomo Filippo Gentile (27 Jan 1843 – 23 Oct 1875 Died)
- Stanislao Eula (28 Jan 1876 – 10 Apr 1886 Died)
- Davide Riccardi (1886 – 1891)
- Giuseppe Castelli (21 Oct 1924 – 12 Sep 1943 Died)
- Leone Giacomo Ossola, O.F.M. Cap. (9 Sep 1945 – 11 Jun 1951 Resigned), appointed titular archbishop on retirement
- Gilla Vincenzo Gremigni, M.S.C. (29 Jun 1951 – 7 Jan 1963 Died), Archbishop (personal title) in 1958
- Placido Maria Cambiaghi, B. (28 Feb 1963 – 30 Oct 1971 Resigned)
- Aldo Del Monte (15 Jan 1972 – 19 Dec 1990 Retired)
- Renato Corti (19 Dec 1990 – 24 Nov 2011 Retired) (elevated to Cardinal in 2016)
- Franco Giulio Brambilla (24 Nov 2011 – )

== Parishes ==
Of the 345 parishes, one is in the Lombard province of Pavia, while rest are divided between the Piedmontese provinces of Novara, Verbano-Cusio-Ossola and Vercelli.

== See also ==
- Timeline of Novara
- List of Catholic dioceses in Italy
- Consignationes beneficiorum diocesis Novariensis

== Books ==
=== Reference works ===
- Gams, Pius Bonifatius (1873). Series episcoporum Ecclesiae catholicae: quotquot innotuerunt a beato Petro apostolo. Ratisbon: Typis et Sumptibus Georgii Josephi Manz. pp. 819–821. (Use with caution; obsolete)
- Eubel, Conradus, ed. (1913). Hierarchia catholica. Vol. 1 (second ed.). Münster: Libreria Regensbergiana. pp. 371–372. (in Latin)
- Eubel, Conradus, ed. (1914). Hierarchia catholica. Vol. 2 (second ed.). Münster: Libreria Regensbergiana. p. 205.
- Eubel, Conradus; Gulik, Guilelmus (1923). Hierarchia catholica. Vol. 3 (second ed.). Münster: Libreria Regensbergiana. pp. 260–261.
- Gauchat, Patritius (Patrice) (1935). Hierarchia catholica. Vol. IV (1592-1667). Münster: Libraria Regensbergiana. p. 262.
- Ritzler, Remigius; Sefrin, Pirminus (1952). Hierarchia catholica medii et recentis aevi. Vol. V (1667-1730). Patavii: Messagero di S. Antonio. p. 293.
- Ritzler, Remigius; Sefrin, Pirminus (1958). Hierarchia catholica medii et recentis aevi. Vol. VI (1730-1799). Patavii: Messagero di S. Antonio. pp. 314–315.
- Ritzler, Remigius; Sefrin, Pirminus (1968). Hierarchia Catholica medii et recentioris aevi (in Latin). Vol. VII (1800–1846). Monasterii: Libreria Regensburgiana.
- Remigius Ritzler; Pirminus Sefrin (1978). Hierarchia catholica Medii et recentioris aevi (in Latin). Vol. VIII (1846–1903). Il Messaggero di S. Antonio.
- Pięta, Zenon (2002). Hierarchia catholica medii et recentioris aevi (in Latin). Vol. IX (1903–1922). Padua: Messagero di San Antonio. ISBN 978-88-250-1000-8.
- Cappelletti, Giuseppe (1858). Le chiese d'Italia: dalla loro origine sino ai nostri giorni (in Italian). Vol. decimoquarto (XIV). Venice: G. Antonelli. pp. 431–529.
- Ughelli, Ferdinando; Coleti, Niccolo (1719). Italia sacra sive de Episcopis Italiae (in Latin). Vol. Tomus quartus (IV) (secunda ed.). Apud Sebastianum Coleti. pp. 689–744.

=== Studies ===
- [Anonymous] Storia del possesso che prendesi dai nuovi vescovi nel primo loro solenne ingresso della chiesa di cui sono provvisti (in Italian). Italia [Novara] 1814. [a controversial piece by a canon of Novara]
- Bascapè, Carlo (1612). Novaria, seu De ecclesia Novariensi libri duo, primus de locis, alter de episcopis. (in Latin) Novara: Apud H. Sessallum, 1612.
- Bascapè, Carlo (1878). La Novara sacra: Tradotta in italiano con annotazioni e vita dell'autore da Giuseppe Ravizza. (in Italian). Novara: Merati, 1878.
- Cantino, Gisella Wataghin; Corti Renato, eds. (1999). Il Cristianesimo a Novara E Sul Territorio: Le Origini : Atti Del Convegno, Novara 10 Ottobre 1998 (in Italian). Novara: Interlinea edizioni. ISBN 978-88-8212-223-2.
- Della Sala, Stefano (2016). I santuari della diocesi di Novara. Novara: Diocesi di Novara: Ufficio Beni Culturi 2016.
- Deutscher, Thomas Brian (2013). Punishment and Penance: Two Phases in the History of the Bishop's Tribunal of Novara. University of Toronto Press. ISBN 978-1-4426-4442-7. [1563-1799]
- Deutscher, T. (1981). "Seminaries and the Education of Novarese Parish Priests, 1593–1627". The Journal of Ecclesiastical History. 32 (3). Oxford University Press: 303–319. doi:10.1017/S0022046900031432. S2CID 144384126.
- Garone, Giuseppe (1865). I reggitori di Novara, memorie. (in Italian). Novara: Stamperia di Francesco Merati, 1865.
- Kehr, Paul Fridolin (1914). Italia pontificia : sive, Repertorium privilegiorum et litterarum a romanis pontificibus ante annum 1598 Italiae ecclesiis, monasteriis, civitatibus singulisque personis concessorum. (in Latin) Vol. VI. pars ii. Berolini: Weidmann.
- Lanzoni, Francesco (1927). Le diocesi d'Italia dalle origini al principio del secolo VII (an. 604). Faenza: F. Lega. (in Italian)
- Lizier, A. (1910). "Episcopato e comitato in Novara nell' alto medio evo," (in Italian), in: Bollettino storico per la provincia di Novara IV (1910), pp. 211–255.
- Malosso, Angela M.; Perotti, Mario; Tuniz, Dorino (1996). La pianura novarese dal romanico al XV secolo: percorsi di arte e architettura religiosa (in Italian). Novara: Interlinea. ISBN 978-88-8212-116-7.
- Morbio, Carlo (1841). Storia della città e diocesi di Novara (in Italian). Milan.
- Savio, Fedele (1898). Gli antichi Vescovi d'Italia: il Piemonte (in Italian). Torino: Bocca.
- Schwartz, Gerhard (1907). Die Besetzung der Bistümer Reichsitaliens unter den sächsischen und salischen Kaisern: mit den Listen der Bischöfe, 951-1122. (in German). Leipzig: B.G. Teubner.
- Stoppa, A.L. (1986). Per una storia dei sinodi novaresi. (in Italian). Novara 1986.
- Vaccaro, Luciano; Tuniz, Dorino, eds. (2007). Diocesi di Novara (in Italian). Brescia: La Scuola. ISBN 978-88-350-2130-8. [List of Bishops at pp. 655–657]
- Weber, Christoph (2010). Episcopus et princeps: italienische Bischöfe als Fürsten, Grafen und Barone vom 17. bis zum 20. Jahrhundert (in German). Peter Lang. pp. 96, 200–204. ISBN 978-3-631-60242-3.
