= Gaspare Visconti =

Roman Catholic prelate

His Excellency Gaspare Visconti
- Archbishop of Milan
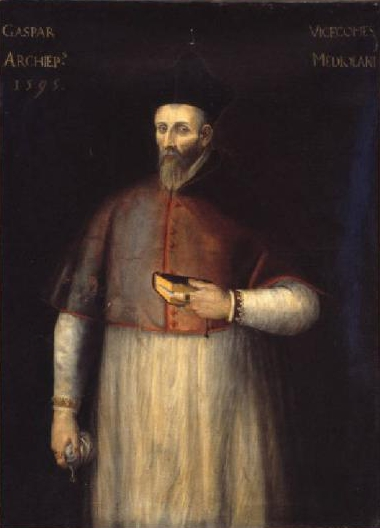
- Church: Catholic Church
- See: Milan
- Appointed: 28 November 1584
- Term ended: 12 January 1595
- Predecessor: Charles Borromeo
- Successor: Federico Borromeo
- Previous post: bishop of Novara

Orders
- Consecration: 13 December 1584 by Tolomeo Gallio

Personal details
- Born: 1538
- Died: 12 January 1595 (aged 56–57)

Gaspare Visconti (1538 – 12 January 1595) was the Archbishop of Milan from 1584 to 1595.

== Early life ==
Born in 1538 to the noble family of Visconti, Gaspare Visconti earned a doctorate in utroque iure at the University of Pavia, where he became a professor of law. Entered in the ecclesiastic career, he moved to Rome where he was appointed auditor (judge) of the Roman Rota. In 1580 Pope Gregory XIII appointed Visconti as own legate to investigate and to settle a dispute in the Order of Malta about the contested deposition of the Grand Master Jean de la Cassière. Returned in Italy from Malta in 1583, on 4 November 1584 Visconti was appointed bishop of Novara, as advised by Saint Charles Borromeo to the pope.

== Archbishop of Milan ==
The Archbishop of Milan Charles Borromeo died during the night of 3/4 November 1584, and the following 28 November, the pope transferred Gaspare Visconti from the diocese of Novara, where he had not yet entered, to Milan. He was consecrated bishop on 13 December 1584 by Cardinal Tolomeo Gallio. He made his formal entrance in Milan on 22 July 1585.

During his tenure as archbishop, many religious institutes opened their convents in the archdiocese, such as the Camaldoleses in 1590 and the Camillians in 1594. In 1594 he published the new edition of Ambrosian Missal which preparation was started under Charles Borromeo.

Following the footsteps of Charles Borromeo, Visconti convened six diocesan synods, started the pastoral visit to all the diocese, erected new churches such as Santa Maria al Paradiso in Milan and the church of Montevecchia and established the hospital of Fatebenefratelli in Milan.

Visconti found difficulties in his action as bishop, which cannot stand comparison with Charles Borromeo's. Gaspare Visconti died on 12 January 1595 in Milan, and his remains were buried in the South nave of the Cathedral of Milan.
