= Gravellona Lomellina =

- Comune
- Comune di Gravellona Lomellina
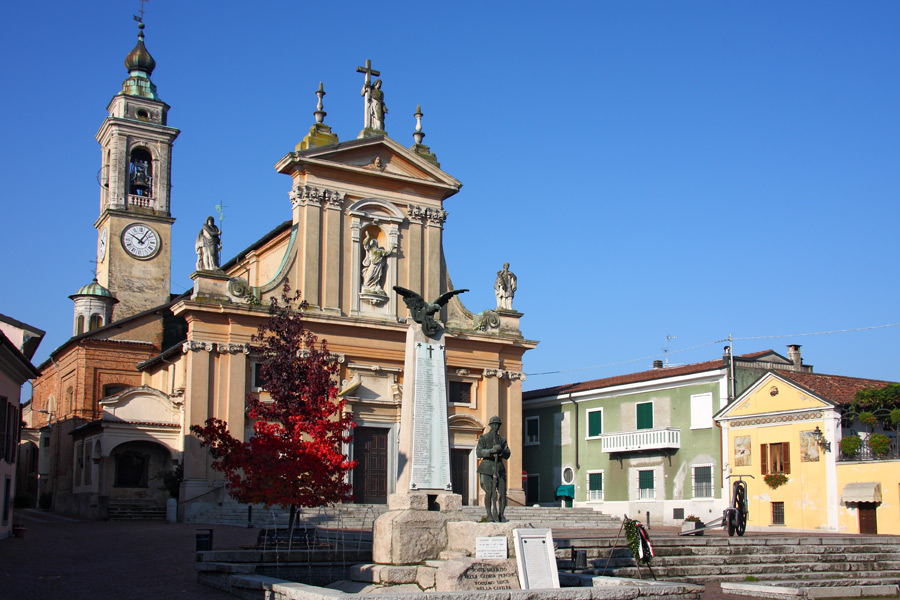

- Location within Italy Location within Lombardy
- Coordinates: 45°20′N 8°46′E
- Country: Italy
- Region: Lombardy
- Province: Pavia (PV)

Government
  - Mayor: Luciano Garza

Area
  - Total: 20.34 km^{2} (7.85 sq mi)
- Elevation: 118 m (387 ft)

Population (31 August 2017)
  - Total: 2,727
  - Density: 134.1/km^{2} (347.2/sq mi)
- Demonym: Gravellonesi
- Time zone: UTC+1 (CET)
  - Summer (DST): UTC+2 (CEST)
- Postal code: 27020
- Dialing code: 0381
- Website: Official website

Gravellona Lomellina (Gravalùna in the local variety of Western Lombard) is a comune (municipality) in the Province of Pavia in the Italian region Lombardy, located about 35 km southwest of Milan and about 35 km northwest of Pavia. It's an agricultural town (its main product is rice).

Gravellona Lomellina borders the following municipalities: Cassolnovo, Cilavegna, Tornaco, Vigevano.

== History ==
Heraldic emblem of the Barbavara family

The first traces of a settlement in this location date from the late Bronze Age, with the pre-Celtic Golasecca culture. Toponomy could be from the etruscan. A Roman settlement is testified by some traces such as two coffins and some coins from the first Empire period. According to tradition, before the Battle of Ticinus, Hannibal built the carthaginean camp amongst the nowadays towns of Gravellona, Cassolnovo and Piccolini, hamlet of Vigevano. During the Middle Ages, Gravellona belongs to the archbishop of Novara, who gave executive power to Ingone. In 1152, Emperor Fredrick Barbarossa confirm feudal power to the "Barbavara" family, from Valsesia. They ruled Gravellona until 1797. Gravellona came under the control of Pavia probably in 1164, and in 1250, the list of lands Pavia, it appears like Gravalona. In 1332 the castle of the counts in Gravellona, however, belong to Cavallazzi family, which, together with Barbavara and Tornielli, are the oldest feudal lords of Gravellona. In 1581, the population gravellonese stood about 1000 inhabitants.

In 1532 Gravellona (who had since returned to the County of Novara) was joined to the new province of the County of Vigevano or Vigevanasco . In 1543, with the Vigevanasco, was absorbed from the domains of Savoy, which since 1707 owned Lomellina. In 1818 the Vigevanasco was reunited with Lomellina, which in 1859 became part of the province of Pavia. Although in the province of Pavia, on the border of the Diocese of Vigevano, Gravellona belongs to the Diocese of Novara.

== Economy ==
The main sector of the economy (as also of the neighboring municipalities of Lomellina) is agriculture. An intense rice cultivation is allowed by the flow of water, in particular from the Canal Quintino Sella. Other productions include poplars and maize. There is also a small industrial area.

== Culture ==
Starting from 1992, on the first weekend of June, Festival of Arts is a festival all around Gravellona, with some folkloristic and artistical events, and a brand new stationary work of art every year. Works exhibited include frescos and murals, shapes in wrought iron on the roofs, mosaics on the pavements and others.

== Twin towns ==
Gravellona Lomellina is twinned with:

- Linards, France
