= Novara Cathedral =

Church building in Novara, Italy

Coordinates: 45°26′45″N 8°37′06″E

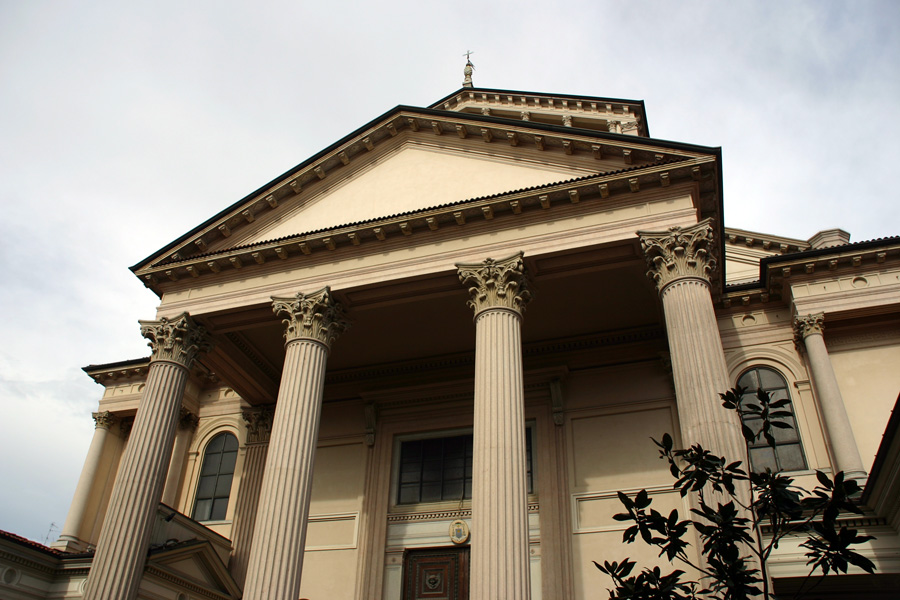
Neoclassical portico and colonnade on the west front of Novara Cathedral

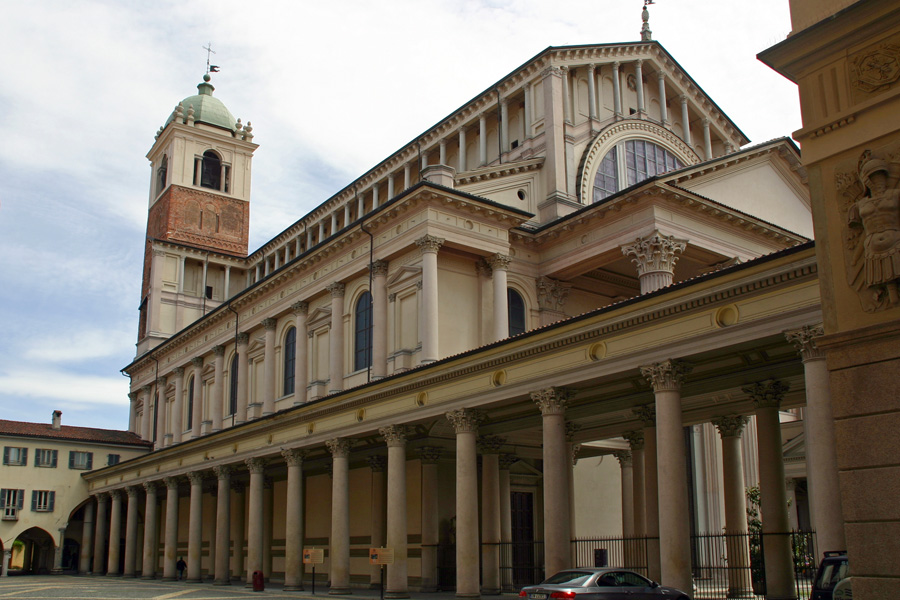
Novara Cathedral

Novara Cathedral (Italian: Duomo di Novara or Cattedrale di Santa Maria Assunta) is a Roman Catholic cathedral, dedicated to the Assumption of the Virgin Mary, located at the Piazza della Repubblica in Novara, Piedmont, Italy. It is the seat of the Bishop of Novara.

Construction of the original church on the site began in the 11th century, and it was consecrated in 1132. It was demolished in the mid-19th century to make way for the current structure, which incorporates elements from its predecessor, including the mosaic floor of the presbytery and a chapel dedicated to Saint Syrus. The present Neo-Classical cathedral was designed by the architect Alessandro Antonelli and was built between 1863 and 1869. It underwent a 12-year restoration project, completed in November 2009.

The baptistry, a separate structure although functionally part of the cathedral, is a Palaeo-Christian building dating from the 4th to 5th centuries.

The composers Pietro Generali, in the years leading up to his death in 1832, and Antonio Cagnoni, from 1879 to 1888, served as the maestri di cappella here.

== Sources ==
- Novara.com: Novara Cathedral (in Italian)
