= Buzzoletto =

Buzzoletto may refer to several places in Italy:

- Buzzoletto is a hamlet of the municipality Viadana, in province of Mantova
- Buzzoletto Vecchio is a farmstead of Garbagna Novarese
- Buzzoletto Nuovo is a farmstead of Garbagna Novarese
