= Garbagna Novarese =

- Comune
- Comune di Garbagna Novarese
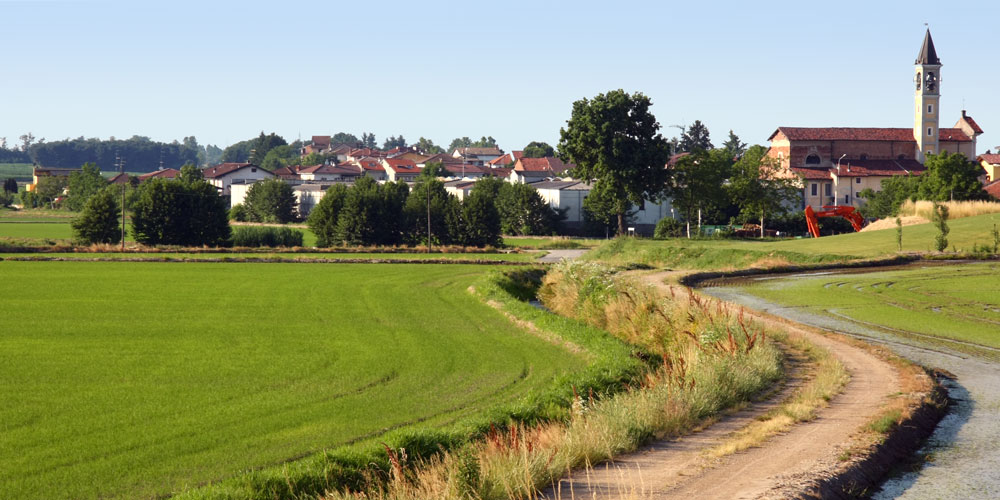
- View of Garbagna Novarese from Arbogna Valley

- Coat of arms

- Location within Italy Location within Piedmont
- Coordinates: 45°23′19″N 8°39′39″E
- Country: Italy
- Region: Piedmont
- Province: Novara (NO)
- Founded: 18 March 1861

Government
  - Mayor: Fabiano Trevisan (civic list)

Area
  - Total: 10.05 km^{2} (3.88 sq mi)
- Elevation: 132 m (433 ft)

Population (31 August 2017)
  - Total: 1,423
  - Density: 141.6/km^{2} (366.7/sq mi)
- Demonym: Garbagnesi
- Time zone: UTC+1 (CET)
  - Summer (DST): UTC+2 (CEST)
- Postal code: 28070
- Dialing code: 0321
- ISTAT code: 003069
- Patron saint: Archangel Michael
- Website: Official website

Garbagna Novarese is a comune (municipality) in the Province of Novara in the Italian region Piedmont, located about 80 kilometres (50 mi) northeast of Turin and about 7 kilometres (4.3 mi) southeast of Novara.

Garbagna Novarese borders the following municipalities: Nibbiola, Novara, Sozzago, Terdobbiate, and Trecate.

== Etymology ==
It is mentioned for the first time in various documents dating back to between 840 and 1150, as Carpania. From 1150 the names Garbania and Garbagna also began to be used, while from 1367 only the latter remained. On May 31, 1863, it officially changed its name from Garbagna to Garbagna Novarese, to distinguish it from its fellow regional Garbagna d'Alessandria. Curiously, in some official documents it is repeatedly called Garbagno.

Regarding the origin of the name, it is believed that Carpania means a forest of càrpani (hornbeams), plants of the birch family that prefer dry soil: among the multitude of forests in the area at the end of the first millennium, that forest must have had an extremely interesting position, to the point of deserving a specific name.

Although not referring directly to the town of Garbagna, an alternative origin has been proposed by some linguistic studies, which have highlighted how the Indo-European root *(s)kerb(h)- ("to braid") has generated many words in current European languages. In particular, passing through the pre-Roman base *garb-, the Franco-Provençal word garbagna ("basket") was obtained.

Other interpretations claim that it derives from the Low Latin garbus ("bush"), thus meaning "wild and wooded place".

== History ==
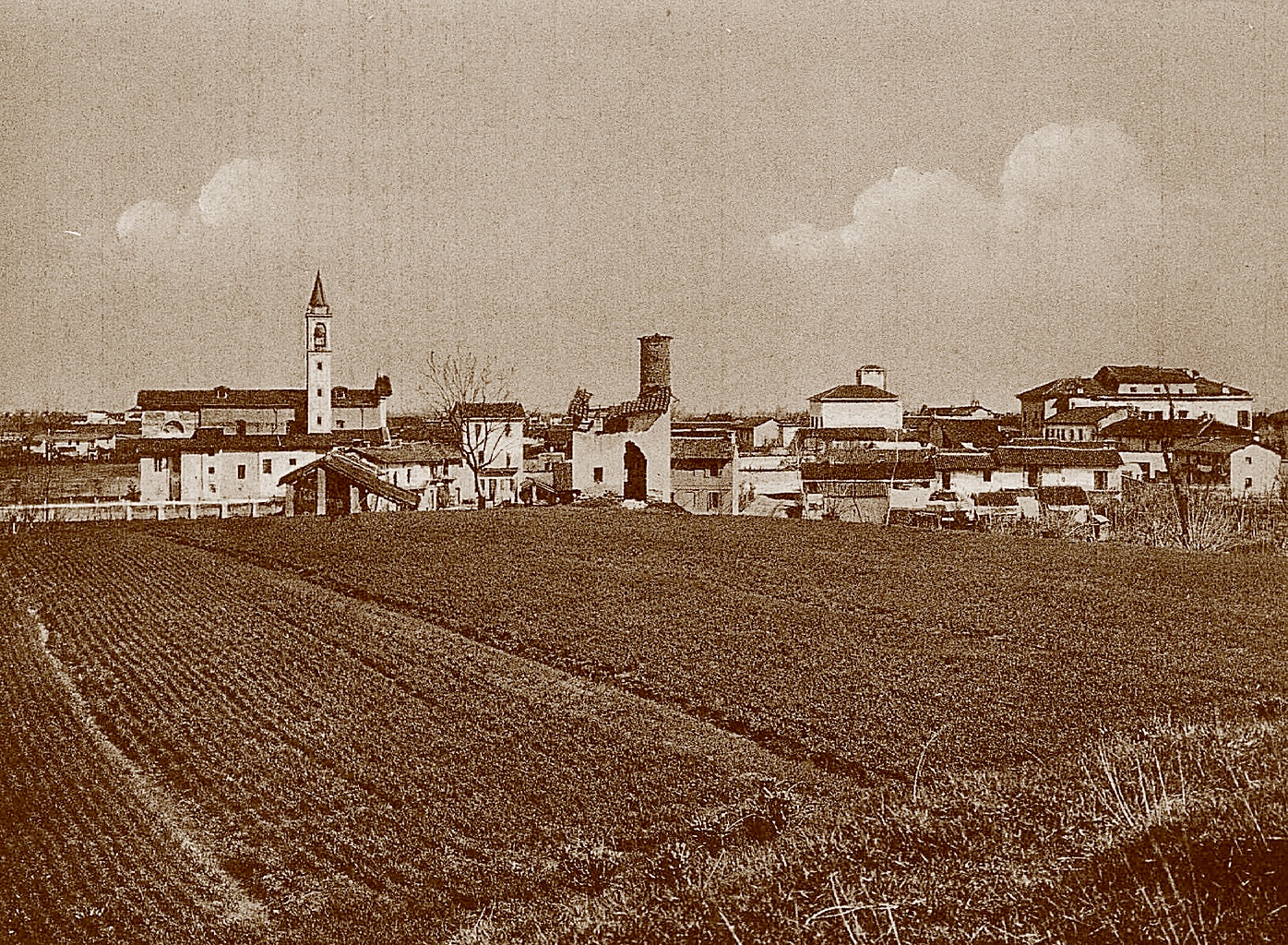
Vintage postcard, with a view of the village from the tower

The history of Garbagna closely follows the history of nearby Novara.

=== Symbols ===
The coat of arms and banner of the municipality of Garbagna Novarese were granted by decree of the President of the Republic on 18 June 1949.

Coat of arms

Argent background, a red lion rampant. External ornaments of the Municipality.

— Municipal statute, art. 6

Gonfalon

A blue flag richly decorated with silver embroidery and bearing the above-described coat of arms with the centred silver inscription: "Comune di Garbagna Novarese". The vertical shaft is covered in blue velvet with silver spiral tacks. The arrow features the coat of arms of the municipality, with the name engraved on the shaft. A tie and tricolour in the national colours, fringed in silver.

— Municipal statute, art. 6

== Geography ==
=== Territory ===
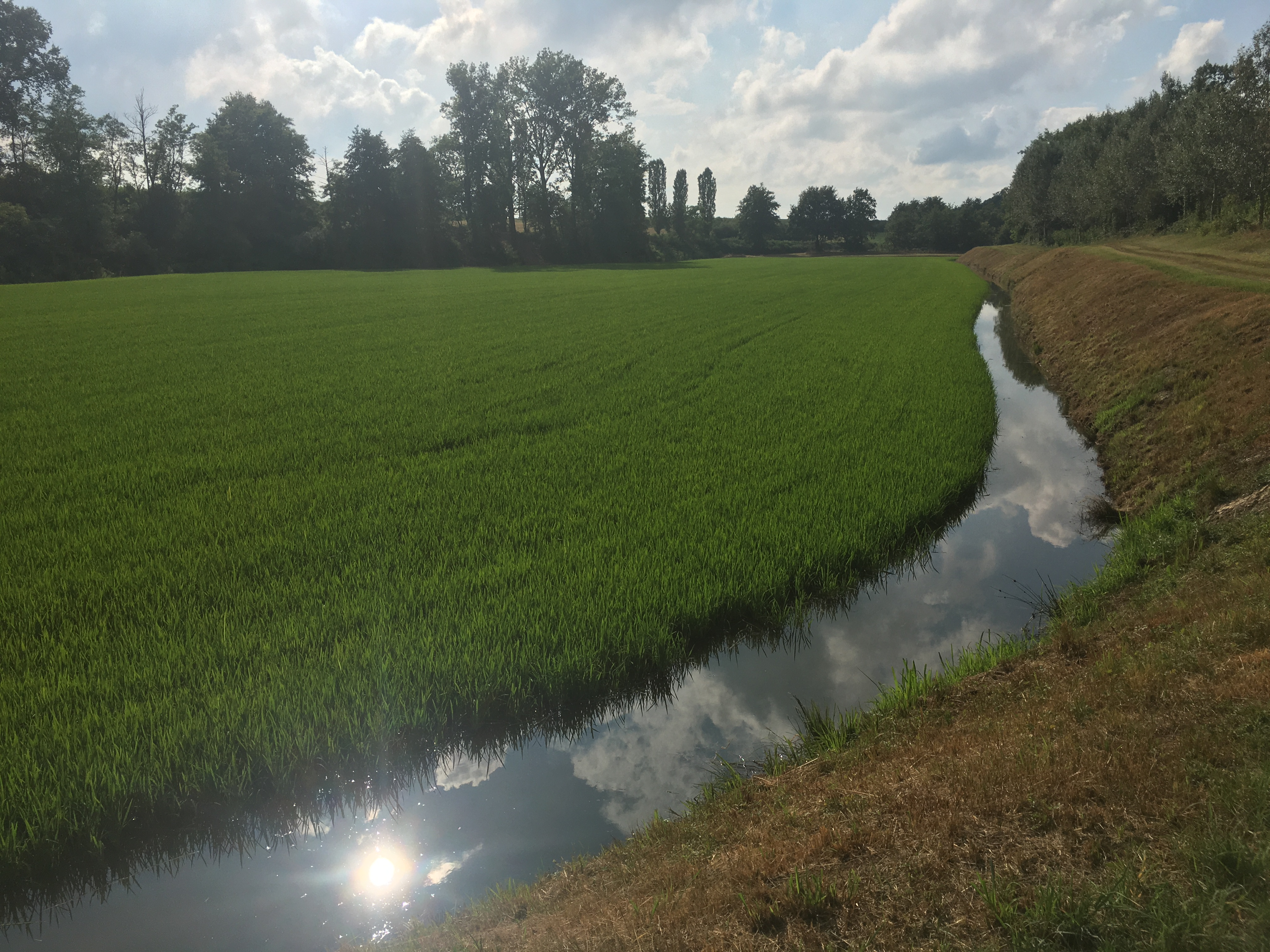
One of the interruptions of the Novara-Vespolate Terrace: the Rì valley

The soil is made up of alluvial gravel and gravelly-sandy deposits, together with silty and clayey material. Its morphology is mixed.

The northwestern section is part of a gravelly fluvioglacial alluvial terrace, the Novara-Vespolate Terrace. It is generally flat, mainly as a result of human intervention that has levelled the land for agricultural purposes, and slopes gently towards the south. The only interruptions correspond to the beds of ancient glacial drains, today identifiable with the paths of the streams Arbogna and Rì. The terrace's edges are contiguous in the municipality of Garbagna, while they are still connected in the municipal area of Novara, which is its northern boundary. Some isolated edges are found near the village centre, but the difference in elevation compared to the surrounding plain has been virtually eliminated by urbanisation.

The remaining part of the territory is flat.

=== Hydrography ===
==== Main watercourses ====
In the western part of the municipality flow the Arbogna stream, the Cavo della Mensa Vescovile and the Rì stream, as well as several smaller watercourses.

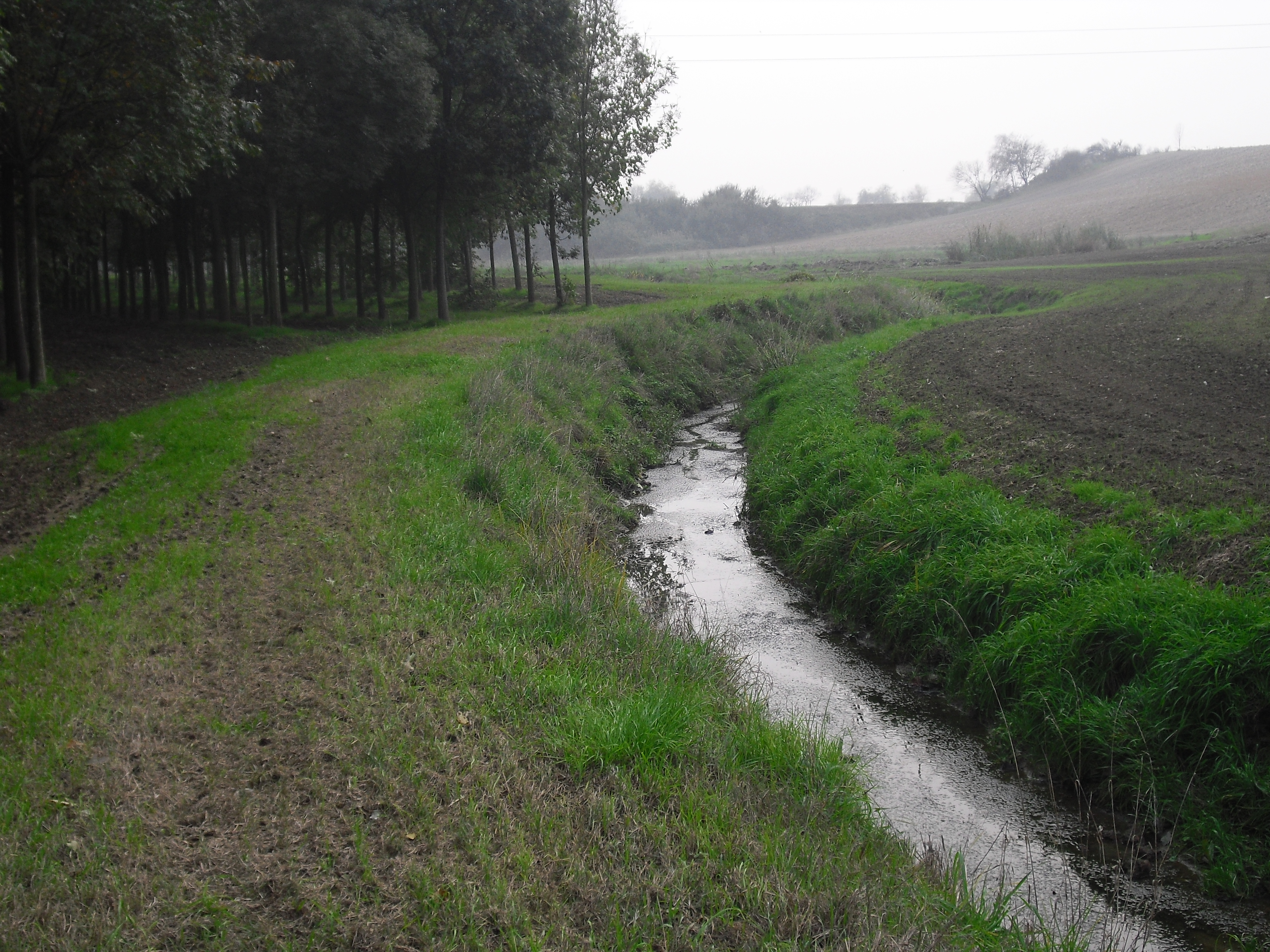
The Arbogna stream, south of Novara

The Arbogna stream originates in Novara and collects rainwater and wastewater from the urban areas in the southern part of the municipality of Novara, also conveying agricultural runoff and spring water. It has a marked torrential character, with extremely variable flow rates: floods can be sudden, as they are linked to rainfall. The stream enters the municipality from the northwest, flowing between the edges of the Novara-Vespolate Terrace. Its course is essentially straight. In the section upstream of the Strada della Brusatina, it flows northwest/southeast, while downstream it veers north-south. It is only marginally contained by earth embankments, with the exception of the final stretch near the sewage treatment plant, where the embankments are more substantial.

The Cavo della Mensa Vescovile also flows through the Arbogna Valley. It originates from the Arbogna stream, still within the municipality of Novara, just above the border with Garbagna. The Arbogna stream, just downstream from farmstead Mariina, passes under the Cavo della Mensa via a siphon, after which the two streams flow parallel and side by side until farmstead Brusatina. The Cavo della Mensa Vescovile finally reaches Garbagna, passes under the SS 211 road, and is manhole-lined in some sections near urban areas. Based on morphological evidence, it is likely an ancient course of the Arbogna itself, later abandoned.

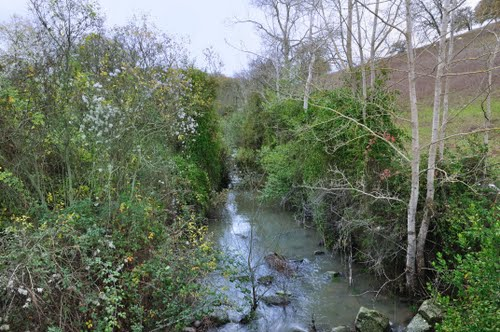
The Rì stream, on the border between Novara and Garbagna

The other watercourse in the western territory is the Rì stream, which originates in the southern part of the municipality of Novara. It is used primarily for irrigation and as a rainwater conveyor. The Rì also represents an ancient drainage line, which, with alternating erosive and alluvial activity, has shaped the landscape of the territory.

At the eastern edge of the municipality flows the Rio Senella, a branch of the Terdoppio Lomellino stream, which originates just upstream in the territory of Sozzago. The Terdoppio originally flowed from the moraine hills of Divignano-Bogogno to its confluence with the Agogna. A weir built near Cerano around the year 1000 to supply the town's agricultural and artisanal activities led to its course being diverted over time. The area of the original riverbed still features numerous springs, almost as if to emphasize its ancient course. These springs flow into two main branches, the Rio Senella and the Rio Refreddo, which, just downstream (near Cassolnovo, in the hamlet of Villanova), reconstitute the Terdoppio stream, now known as the Terdoppio Lomellino.

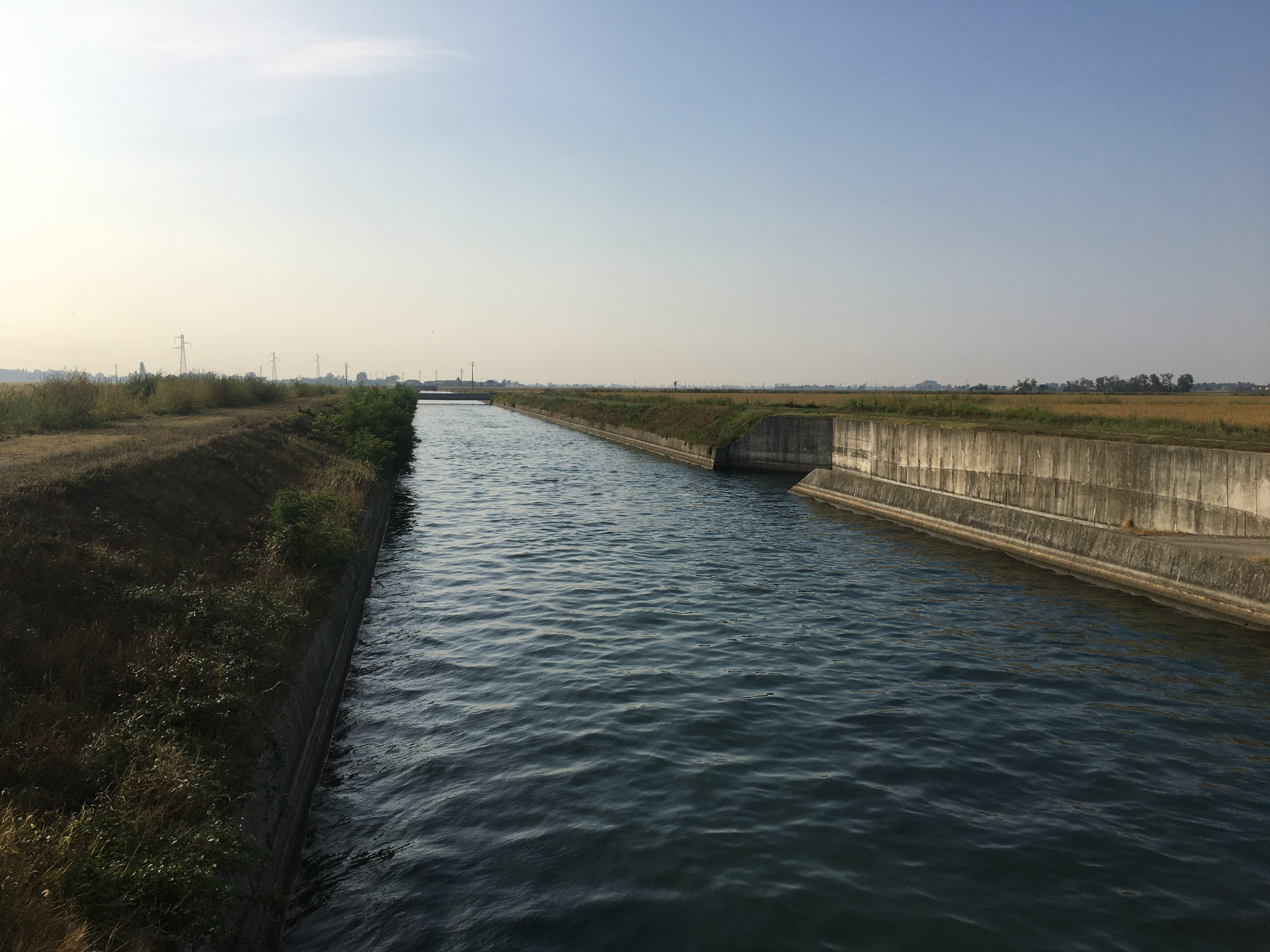
The Quintino Sella Canal in Garbagna

Finally, the eastern part of the municipality is crossed by an important irrigation artery: the Quintino Sella Canal. Built in 1870, it originates from the Cavour Canal north of Novara and conveys water south and east, supplying it to the municipalities of Garbagna, Terdobbiate, and Tornaco. At Cilavegna, it forks into two sub-districts. With an estimated flow rate of approximately 12 m^{3}/s, it is the main irrigation source in the area, distributing water to the lower-level canals and collectors.

==== Minor watercourses ====
The territory is crisscrossed by a dense network of canals and ditches, generally artificial, which allow for agricultural irrigation by flooding. This is particularly true in the eastern part of the municipality, which is markedly different from the western part from a hydrographic perspective. The aforementioned Quintino Sella Canal and numerous springs feed much of this network of canals and artificial ditches.

Among the significant artificial canals, the Cavo dell'Ospedale is worth mentioning, with an old, long-abandoned riverbed. It flows in the section downstream from the railway, parallel to the road to Terdobbiate, then parallel to the SS 211 road until it crosses the Arbogna stream, downstream of which the riverbed has been eliminated.

Another irrigation canal is the Cavo del Comune di Vespolate, in the eastern part of the village. It passes under the road to Terdobbiate just west of the train station and flows towards Nibbiola, subsequently continuing alongside the SS 211 road and turning east along the southern border of the municipality.

Among the canals used for irrigation are the Roggia Molinara and the Cavo di Moncucco.

==== Artesian springs ====
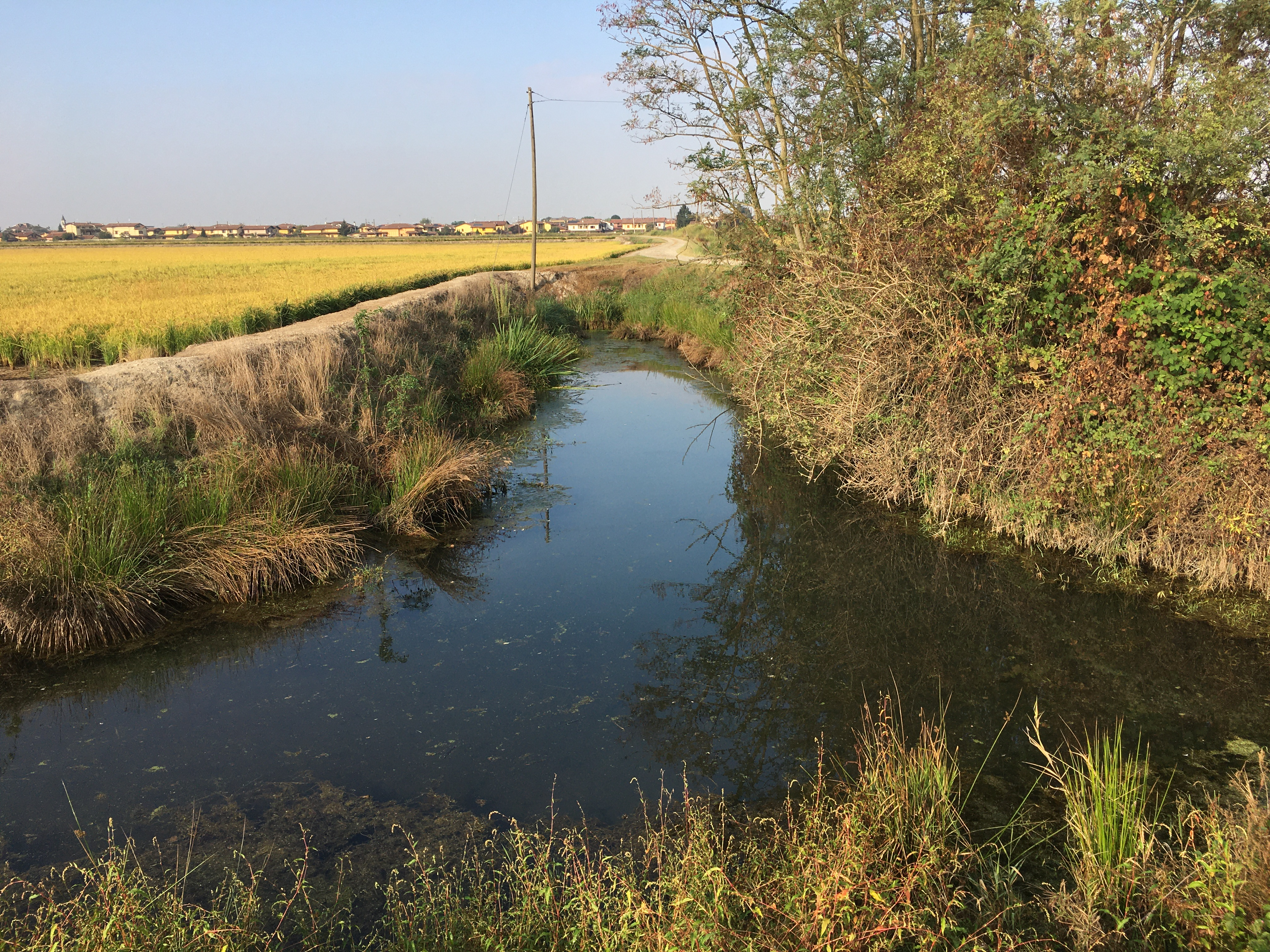
Roggiola spring, eastern head

The eastern part of the municipality features numerous springs, a peculiarity of the Novara plain. In the Garbagna area, the phenomenon is caused by artificial cuts in the soil, deep enough to reach the underlying water table (almost at ground level) and then convey it into specially constructed canals. Observation of the springs has allowed us to estimate the depth of the water table at 2-2.5 meters.

Proceeding from west to east the springs are:

- Borghetto spring: originates just north of the village, has a single head and a typical "teardrop" shape; it is covered along almost the entire length, along Via Colombo, from Via IV Novembre to the road to Terdobbiate, except for the first stretch; the covering was necessary to make the area buildable;
- Hospital spring;
- Roggiola spring: originates just west of the Quintino Sella Canal and has two heads.

== Demography ==
Documented inhabitants before the unification of Italy (1861):

Population between 1600 and 1854

Year	Pop.	±%
1600	350	—
1700	400	+14.3%
1723	431	+7.7%
1764	446	+3.5%
1779	508	+13.9%
1780	525	+3.3%

Year	Pop.	±%
1781	520	−1.0%
1790	480	−7.7%
1792	538	+12.1%
1793	540	+0.4%
1805	553	+2.4%
1822	608	+9.9%

Year	Pop.	±%
1837	690	+13.5%
1839	660	−4.3%
1841	674	+2.1%
1849	690	+2.4%
1854	762	+10.4%

Population between 1861 and 2021

Year	Pop.	±%
1861	903	—
1871	998	+10.5%
1881	1,107	+10.9%
1901	1,405	+26.9%
1911	1,377	−2.0%
1921	1,194	−13.3%

Year	Pop.	±%
1931	1,028	−13.9%
1936	1,025	−0.3%
1951	1,091	+6.4%
1961	1,018	−6.7%
1971	788	−22.6%
1981	876	+11.2%

Year	Pop.	±%
1991	851	−2.9%
2001	964	+13.3%
2011	1,350	+40.0%
2021	1,405	+4.1%

In recent years, the municipality of Garbagna Novarese has seen the most significant relative demographic expansion in the whole of Piedmont, returning to the levels of a century ago; the population has in fact increased from 964 inhabitants in 2001 to 1326 in 2009. In particular, between 2007 and 2008 there was a growth of 176 inhabitants, corresponding to +15.6%. This has also led to a notable building development with the construction of many houses, mainly in the eastern area of the village.

== Government ==
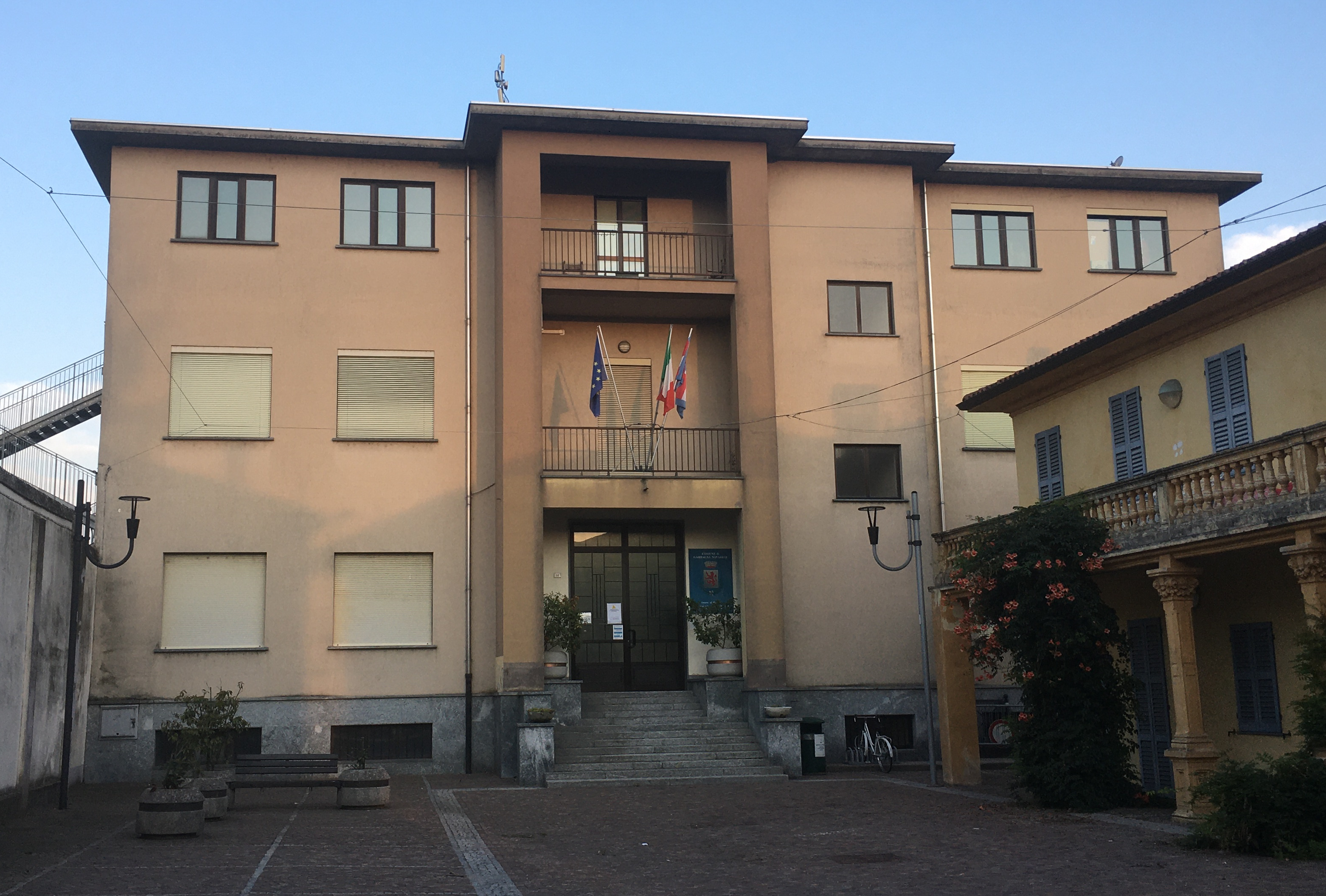
The town hall

The administration periods prior to 1932 are not reported systematically by the current sources; the following list contains data of the available years.

Years	Office holder	Title	Notes
1780	Giovanni Paolino	Mayor	
1797	Pietro Cerina	Mayor	
1799	Antonio Maria Bandi	President of the municipal body	
1826	Giovanni Cambieri	Mayor	
1831, 1832	Pietro Cerina	Mayor	
1834, 1835, 1838	Gaetano Robecco	Mayor	
1837, 1840	Cesare Morbio	Mayor	
1841, 1842, 1844, 1845	Enea Silvio Moretti	Mayor	
1846, 1847	Gioachino Montalenti	Mayor	
1849	Giovanni Battista Robecchi	Mayor	
1851, 1853, 1854, 1857, 1858	Carlo Cappa	Mayor	
1862, 1863	Giovanni Battista Robecchi	Mayor	
1865, 1866, 1869, 1870, 1873	Bartolomeo Manzini	Mayor	
1879, 1886, 1889	Costantino Bevilacqua	Mayor	
1896, 1899, 1907, 1910, 1916, 1919	Carlo Geri	Mayor	
1930	Carlo Geri	Podestà	

From 1932 onwards, however, the succession of administrations is much more precise.

Period		Office holder	Party	Title	Notes
-	September 1, 1932	Carlo Geri	National Fascist Party	Podestà	
September 2, 1932	1937	Carlo Angelo Allevi	National Fascist Party	Podestà	
1937	1943 (at least)	Francesco Magni	National Fascist Party	Podestà	
1945	1948	Felice Pavesi		Mayor	
1948	1964	Emilio Tencaioli	Italian Socialist Party	Mayor	
1964	1970	Gaudenzio Giarda		Mayor	
1970	1981	Mario Costadone	Christian Democracy	Mayor	
1981	1987	Giacomo Manzini	Christian Democracy	Mayor	
March 26, 1987	June 22, 1990	Giuseppino Boeri	Christian Democracy	Mayor	
June 22, 1990	April 19, 1993	Giuseppino Boeri	Christian Democracy	Mayor	
May 17, 1993	April 24, 1995	Giampiero Fornara	Christian Democracy	Mayor	
April 24, 1995	June 14, 1999	Giampiero Fornara	Italian People's Party	Mayor	
June 14, 1999	June 14, 2004	Giampiero Fornara	Italian People's Party	Mayor	
June 14, 2004	June 8, 2009	Davide Milanesi	civic list	Mayor	
June 8, 2009	May 26, 2014	Davide Milanesi	civic list	Mayor	
May 26, 2014	May 22, 2019	Matteo Manzini	civic list: Obiettivo Garbagna	Mayor	
May 22, 2019	September 20, 2020	Antonella Azzarello		Prefectural commissioner	
September 20, 2020	incumbent	Fabiano Trevisan	civic list: Progetto Garbagna	Mayor	

== Farmsteads ==
Farmstead locations on the municipality territory

Just like the whole Bassa Novarese, Garbagna area is full with farmsteads, nerve centres of the rural activity.

The farmsteads outside the village have been considered over time as real hamlets of the municipality, and are currently reported as agglomerations by the municipal statute: Marijna, Belvedere, Brusattina, Moncucco, Buzzoletto Nuovo, Buzzoletto Vecchio, Cascinetta. The only farmstead within the village is Borghetto.

== Twin towns ==
Garbagna is twinned with:

- (Italy) Rio Saliceto, since 2024
- (Italy) Trino, since 2024

== Monuments and places of interest ==
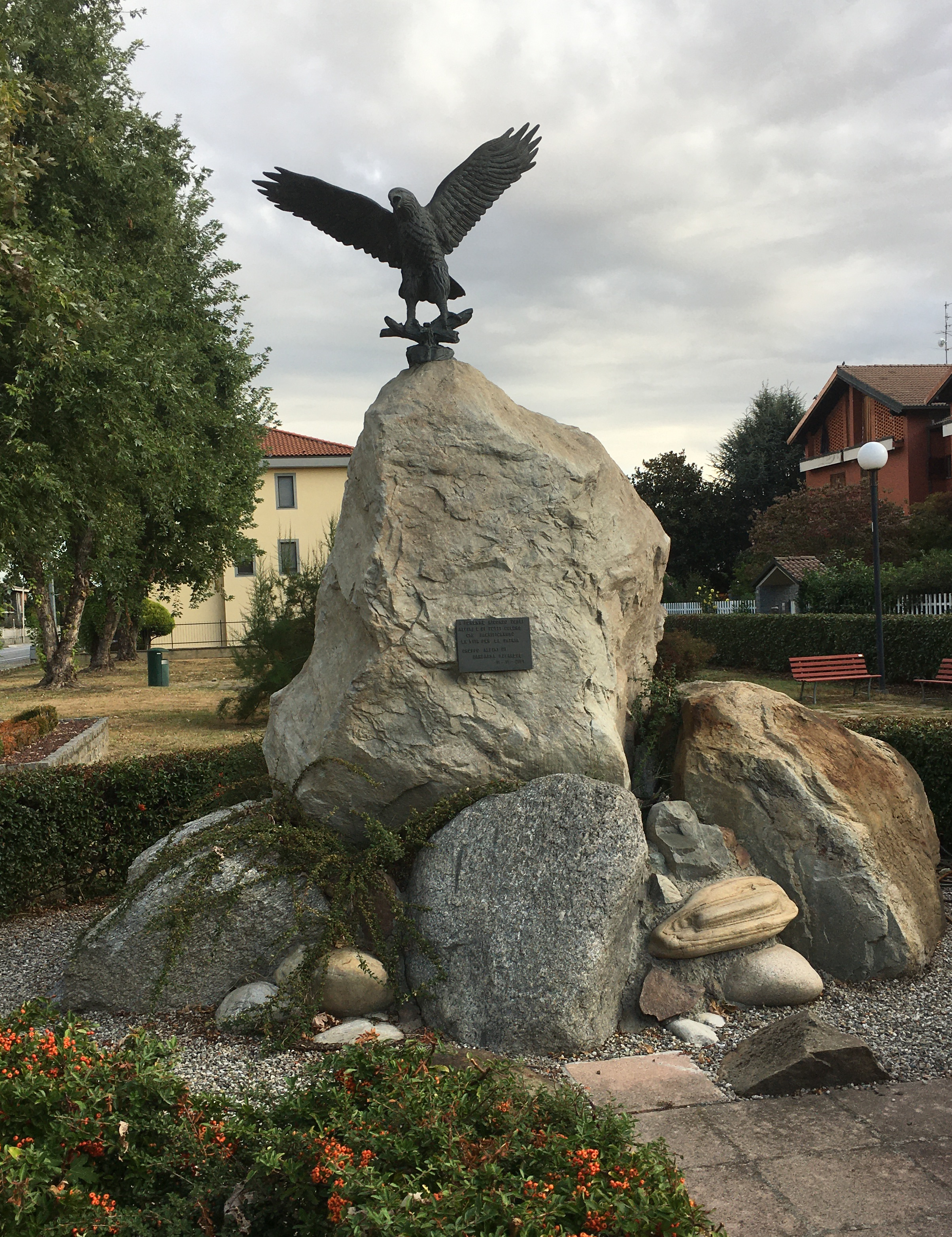
Monument to the Alpini and the Fallen, on the main road

- Chiesa di San Michele Arcangelo: parish church of the village, whose original oratory was erected by the Lombards, replaced at the end of the 16th century with the current building, in turn restored in the 17th century; in the early years of the 19th century the side naves were added;
- Monument to the Alpini and the Fallen: commissioned by the Alpini Group of Garbagna and inaugurated on November 10, 2001;
- Oratorio di Santa Maria (Madonna di Campagna): small building dating back to the end of the 11th century, with interventions from the 12th century; inside are thirteen frescoes dating back to the 15th century, several realized by the Cagnola workshop;
- Palazzo Caroelli: country residence of the counts Caroelli, feudal lords of the village, dating back to the 17th or 18th century; today it is in an advanced state of decay;
- Ri valley: small valley within the Novara-Vespolate fluvial-glacial terrace, west of the village, where the Ri stream flows;

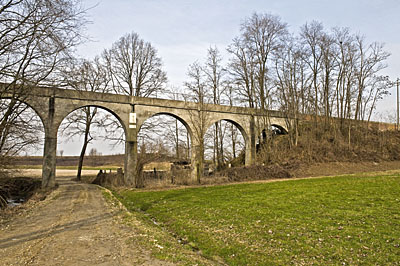
Vallazza aqueduct bridge

- Vallazza aqueduct bridge: six-arch aqueduct bridge that allows the Ricca canal to cross the Ri valley.

== Culture ==
On the second floor of the town hall is the civic library, and on the mezzanine floor is the public primary school, accessed by the north entrance.

== Transport ==
Both the territory of the municipality and the village are crossed longitudinally by the provincial road 211 of Lomellina (SP 211), which leads to Novara to the north and to Mortara to the south. The remaining roads are the provincial road 76 to Terdobbiate and the provincial road 98 which connects Garbagna to Olengo and Terdobbiate.

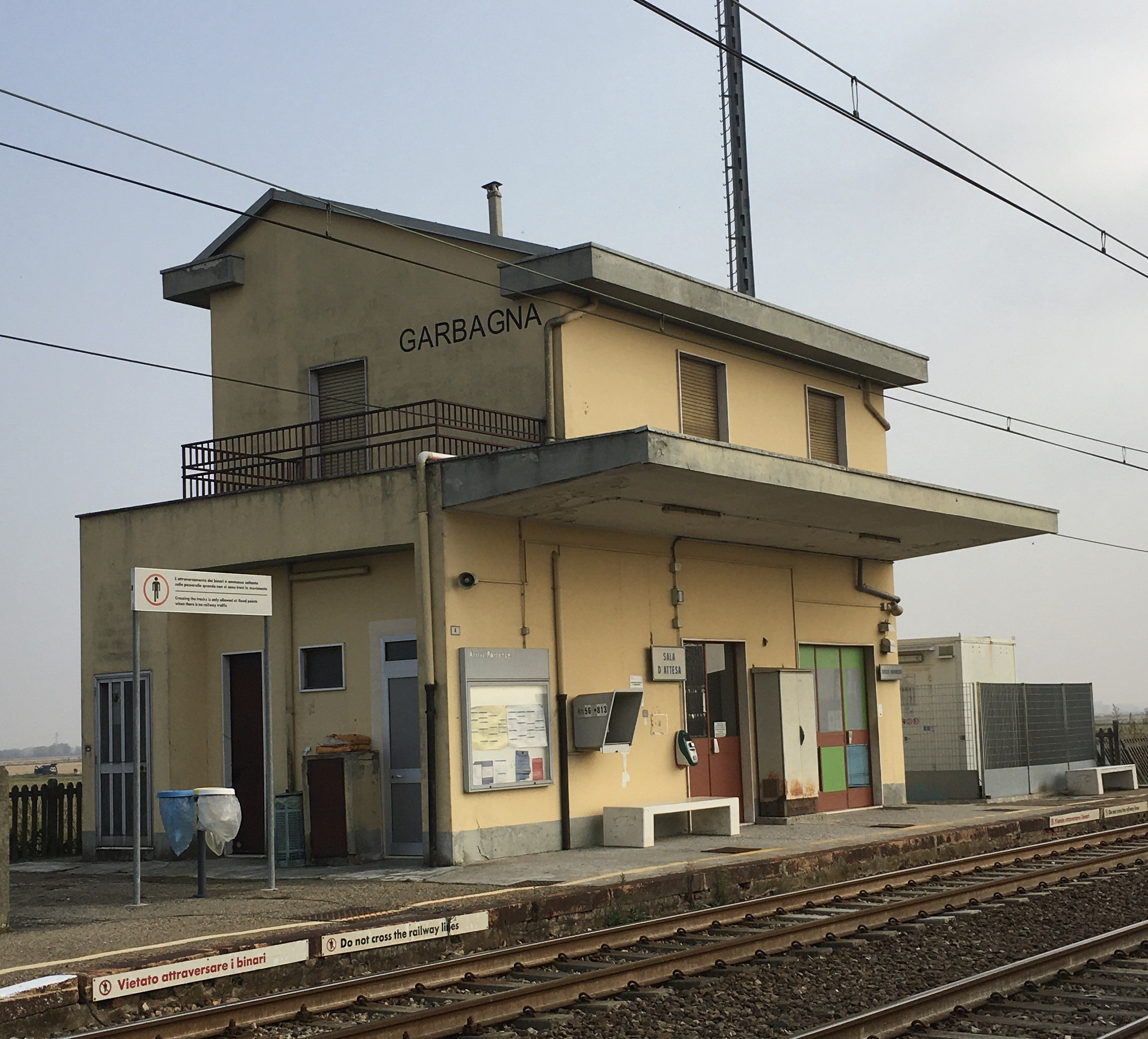
The railway station

To the east of the town is the railway station, connected to the Novara-Alessandria line.

On the main street of the village, in front of the town hall, is a bus stop for the Novara-Cilavegna line.

== Sport ==
=== Sports facilities ===
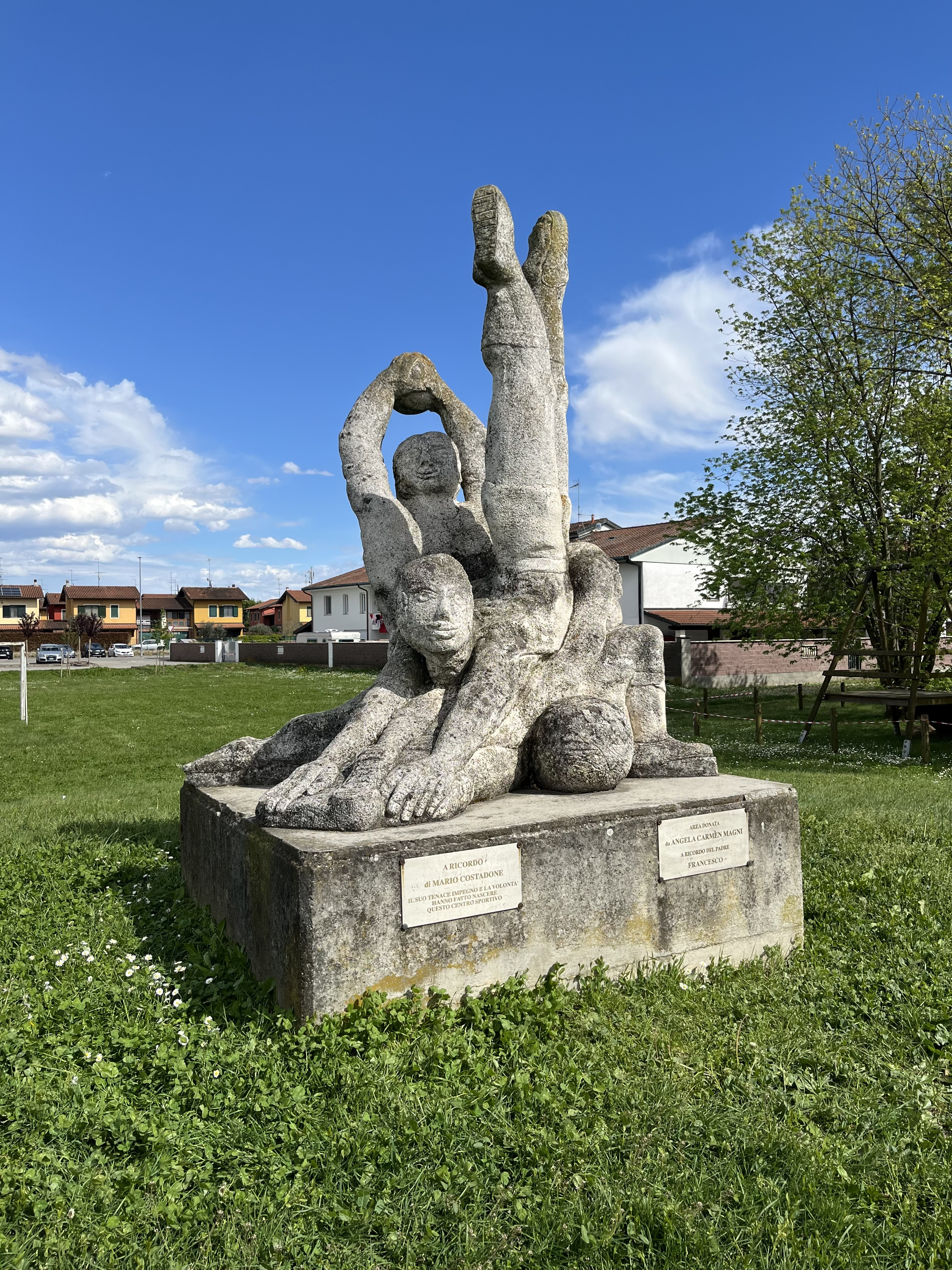
Monument to sport, at Mario Costadone Sports Centre

The Mario Costadone Sports Centre was built in the early 1980s, named in memory of Mayor Mario Costadone, who personally initiated the project.

The centre is equipped with:

- lighted tennis courts, with changing rooms and restrooms;
- a green area with benches and children's playground (including a zip line, since 2015);
- a lighted 11-a-side soccer field, with changing rooms;
- an outdoor pitch for public use.

== Image gallery ==
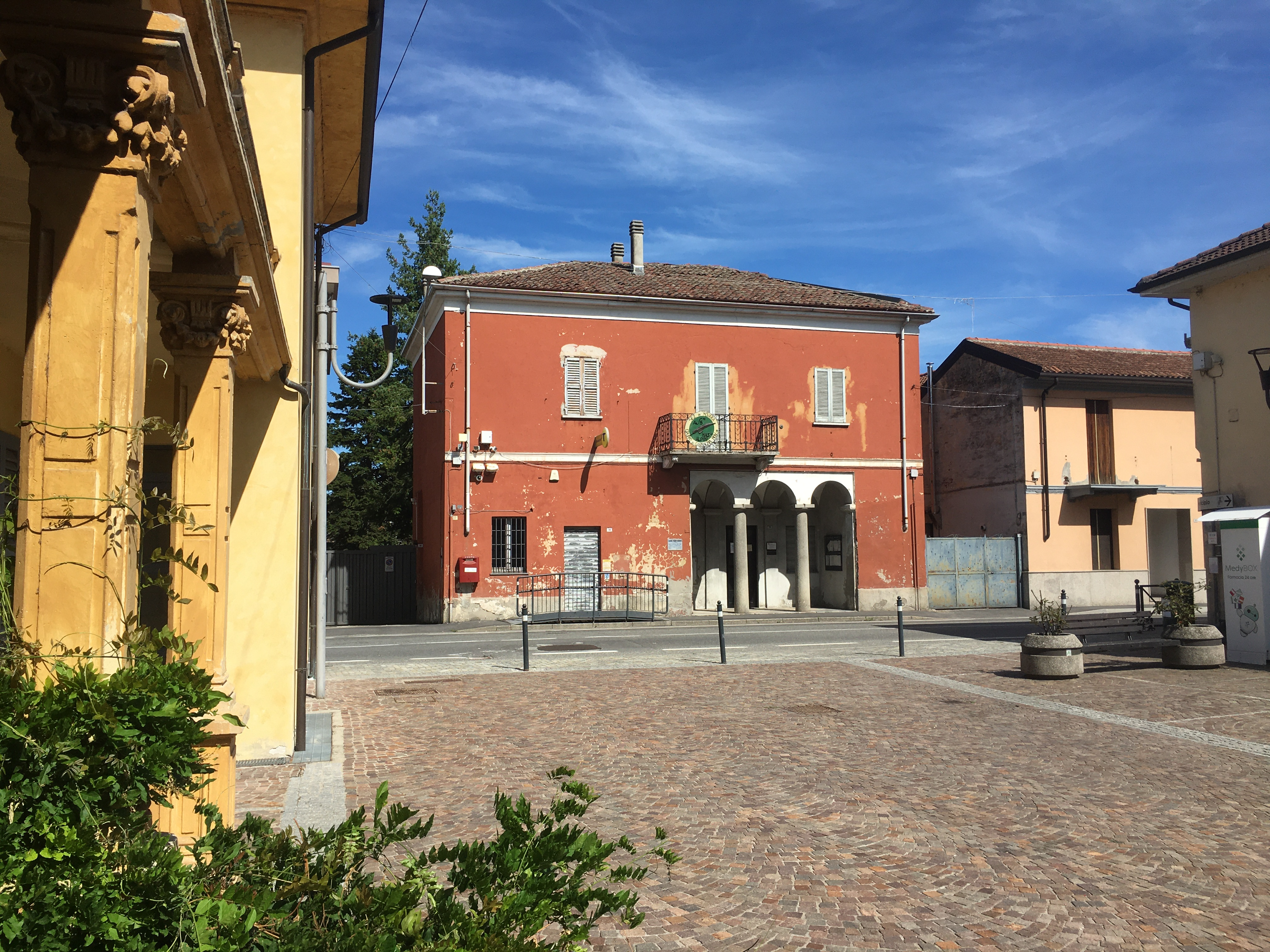
The former town hall, now used as a post office, medical clinic and local headquarters of the National Alpini Association

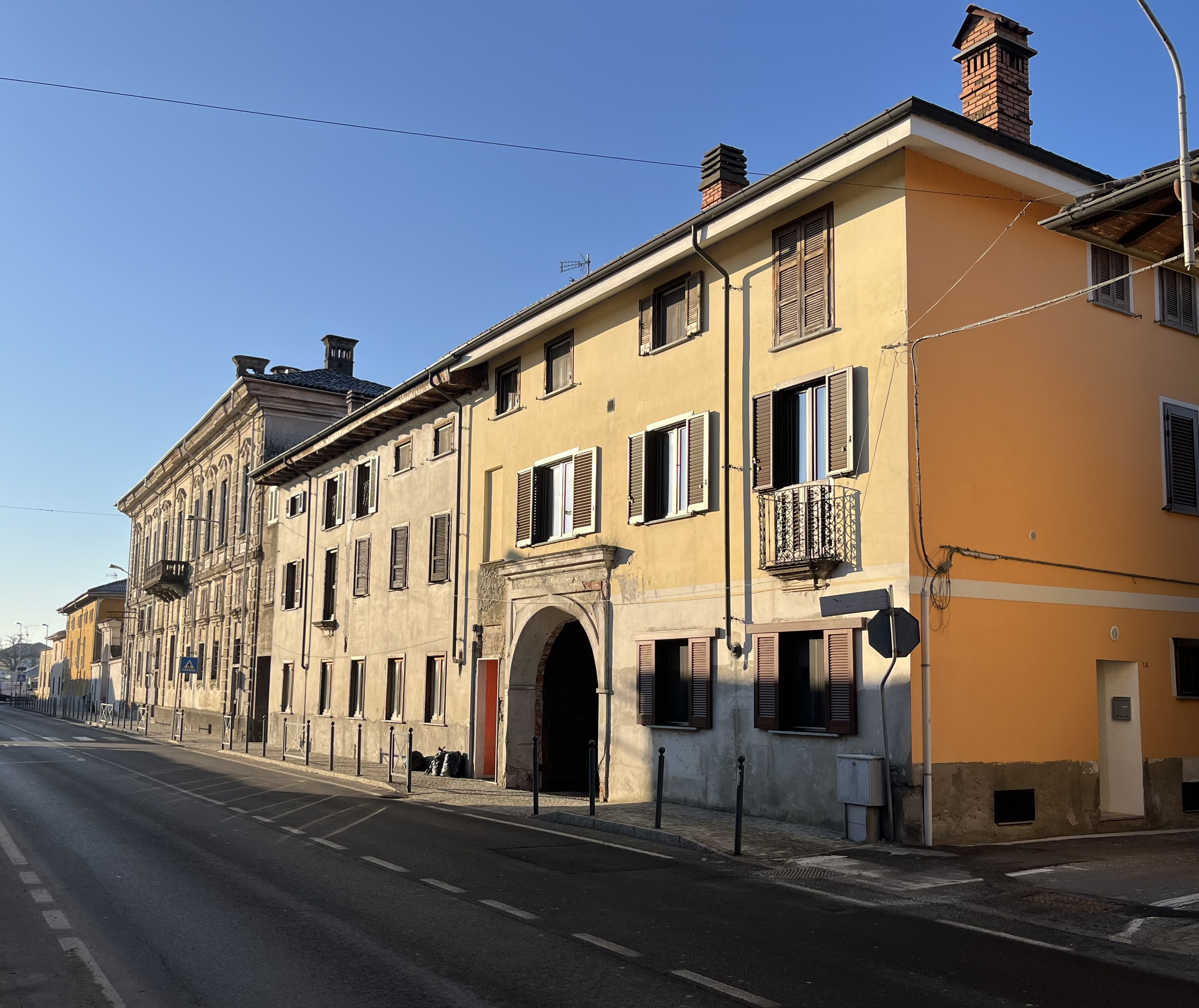
Geri House, an ancient noble palace on the main street

The western part of the municipality, heart of the Novara-Vespolate fluvial-glacial terrace
Some examples of rural buildings

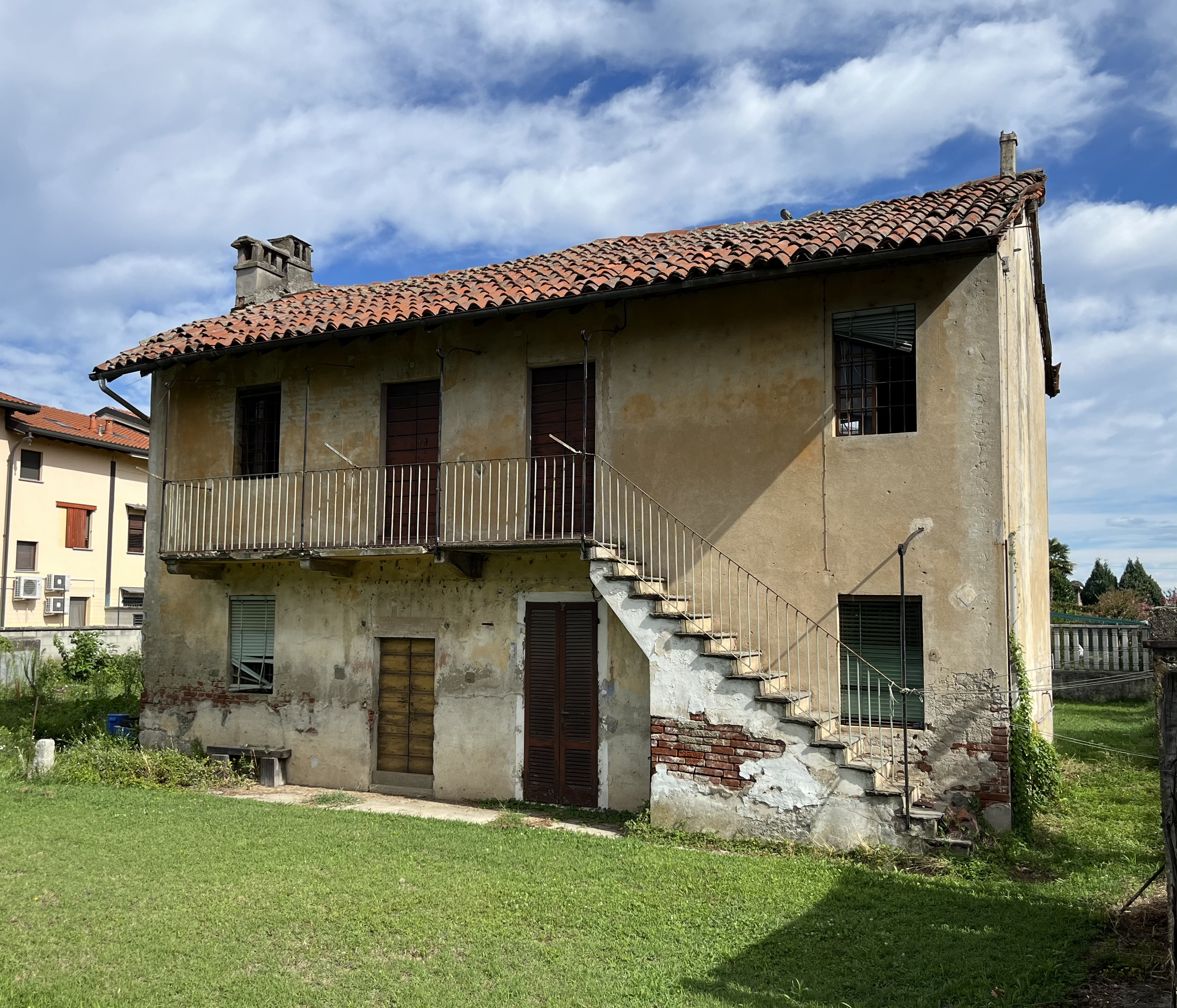
Rural house (south side), on the main street

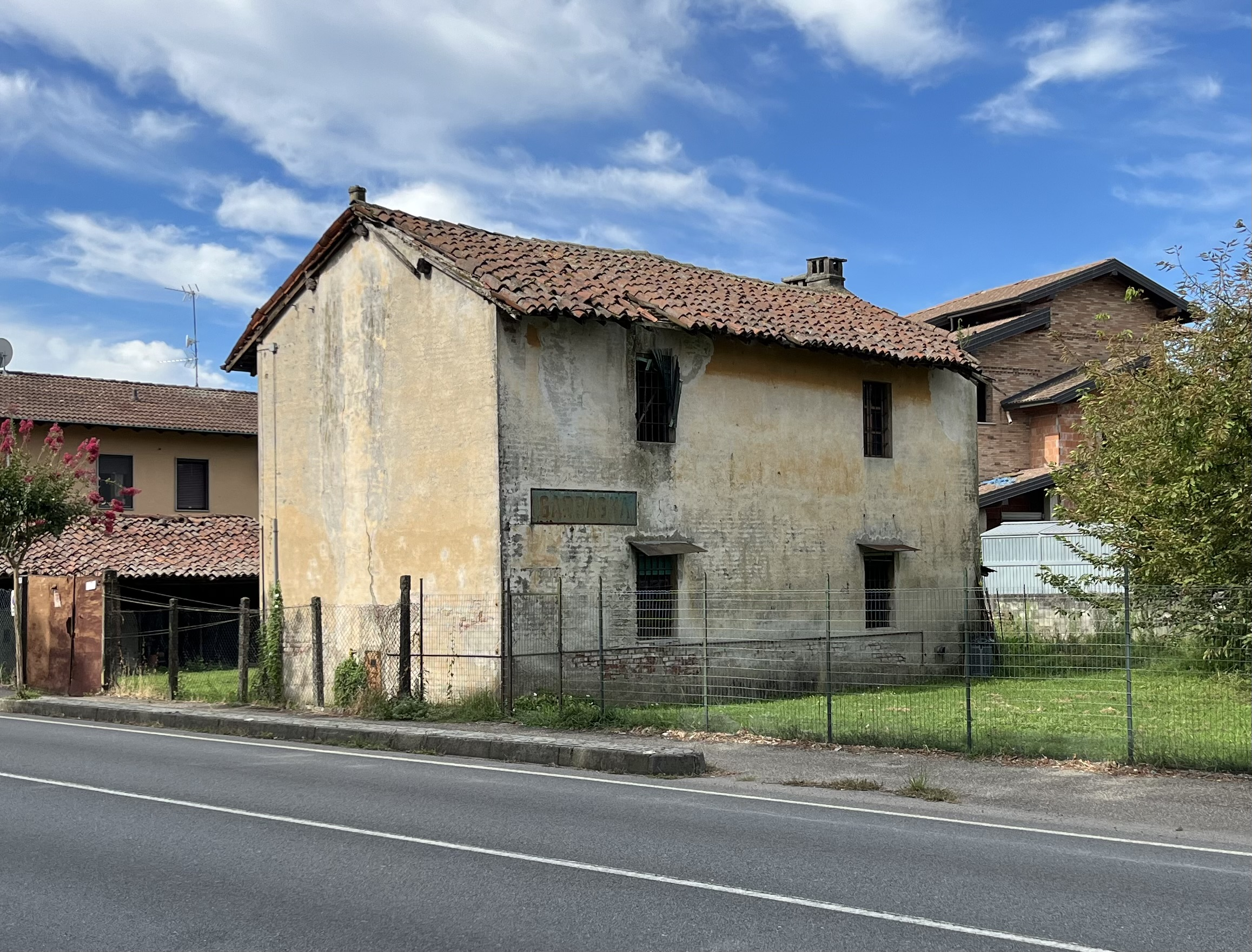
Rural house (north-east side), on the main street

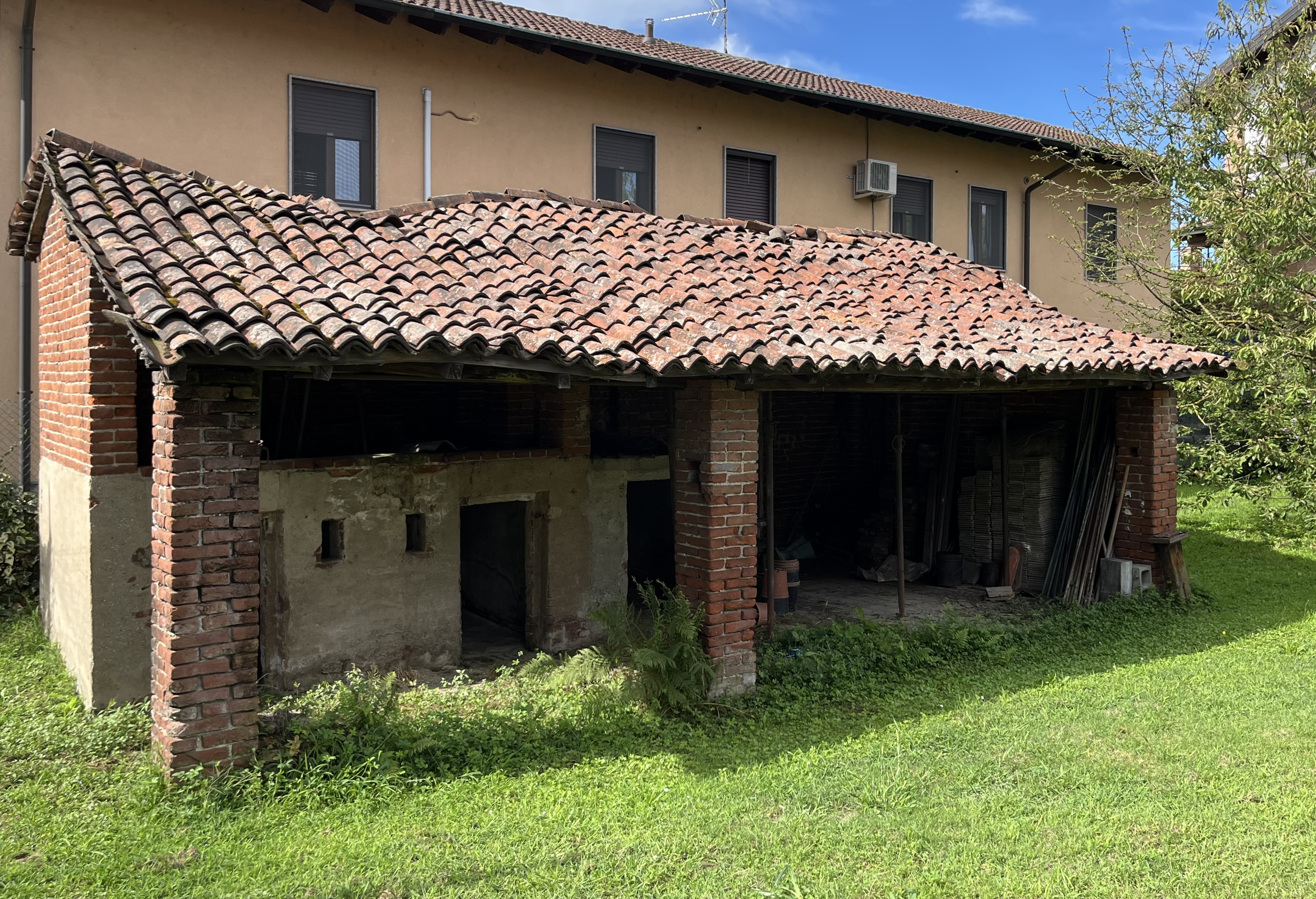
Small farm shed with chicken coop

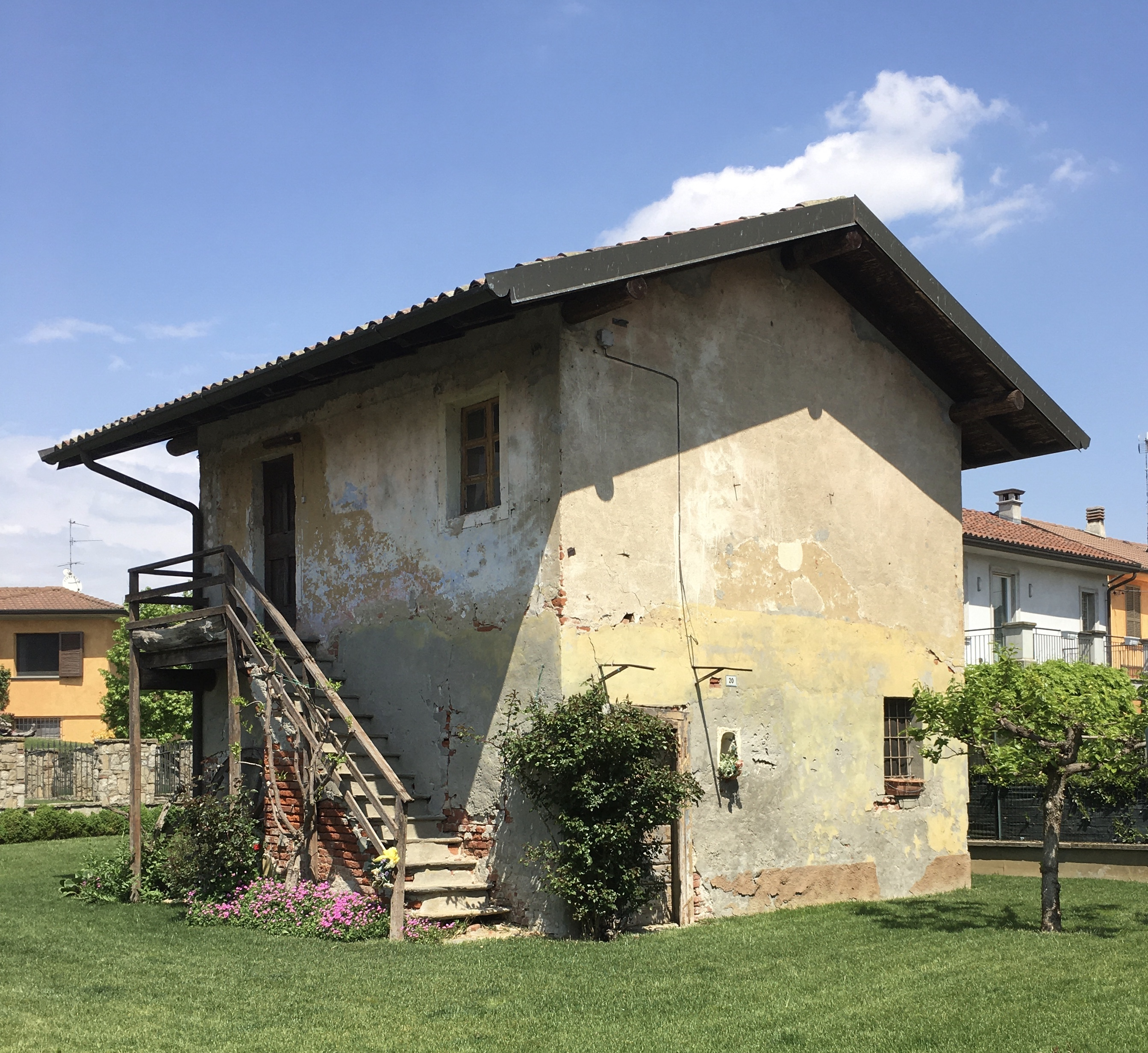
Small rural house

== See also ==
- History of Garbagna Novarese
- Buildings in Garbagna Novarese:
  - Farmsteads
  - Oratorio di Santa Maria
  - Chiesa di San Michele Arcangelo
  - Palazzo Caroelli
  - Railway station

== Bibliography ==
- Cassani, Lino; Colli, Ernesto (1948). Memorie storiche di Garbagna Novarese [Historical memories of Garbagna Novarese] (in Italian). Novara: Pietro Riva & C – via Foto Emilio Alzati.
- Colli, Ernesto (1978). Garbagna, Nibbiola, Vespolate, Borgolavezzaro - Le mie memorie [Garbagna, Nibbiola, Vespolate, Borgolavezzaro - My memoirs] (in Italian). Novara: Tip. San Gaudenzio – via Foto Emilio Alzati.
- Arrigoni, Enrico; Mambrini, Gabrio; Ramati, Silvano (1989). Oltre mezzo secolo di sport e di passione calcistica a Garbagna [Over half a century of sport and football passion in Garbagna] (in Italian). Illustrated by Rosella Marchetti, patronage by municipality of Garbagna Novarese. Novara: Istituto Geografico De Agostini.
- Ferrari, Anna Maria (29 October 2007). "Variante Strutturale 2003 - Relazione geologico-tecnica" [Structural Variation 2003 - Geological-technical report]. Comune di Garbagna Novarese (in Italian).
- Antonione, Abele Lino (2010). L'ambiente della Bassa Novarese [The environment of Bassa Novarese] (in Italian). Illustrated by Silvano Meroni, foreword by Serena Fiocchi. Novara: Italgrafica.
