= Garbagna Novarese railway station =

Railway station in Piedmont, Italy

Garbagna
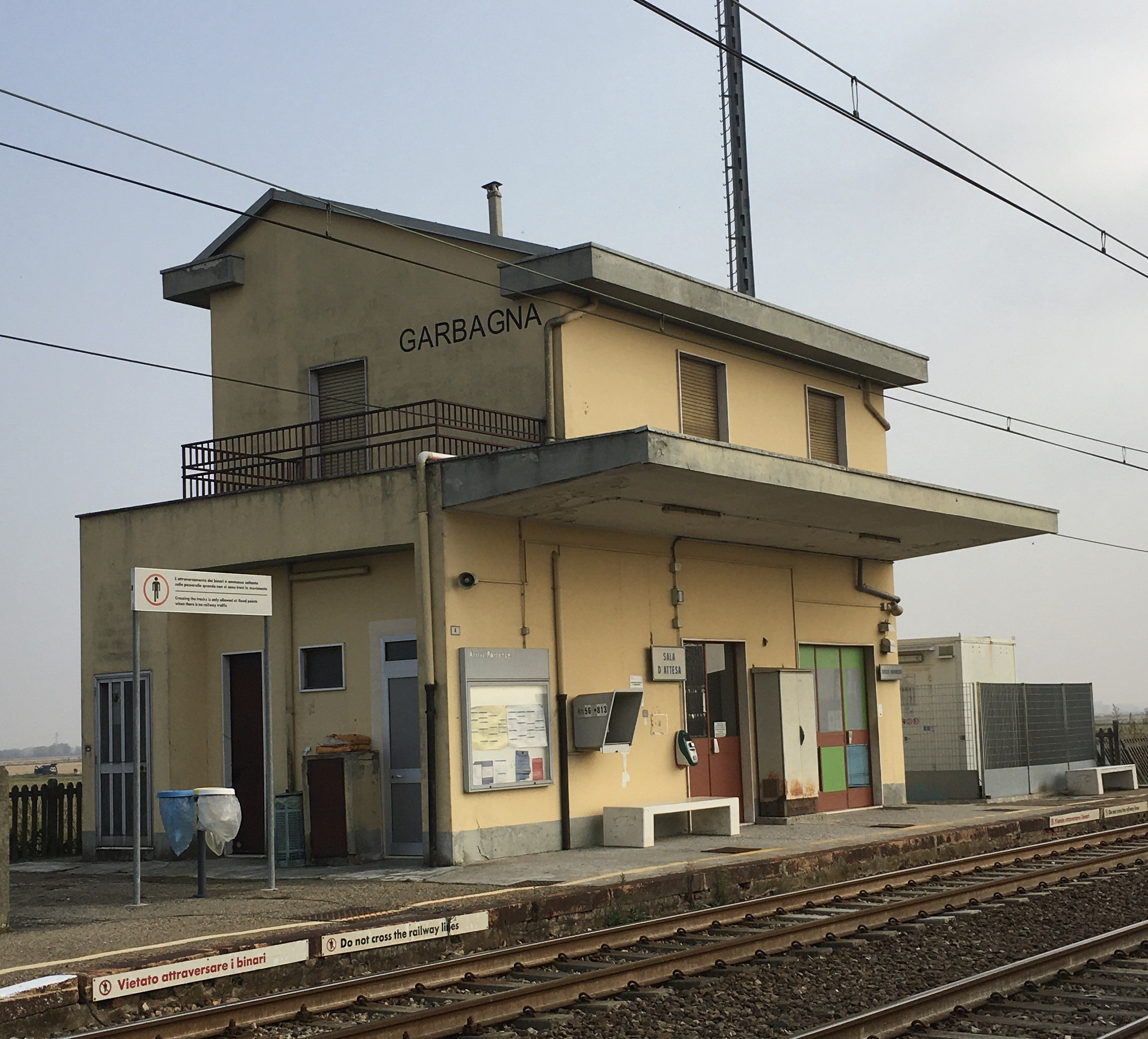

General information
- Location: Via Guglielmo Marconi, 15 - 28070 - Garbagna Novarese; Province of Novara; Italy
- Coordinates: 45.38557°N 8.666303°E
- Elevation: 130 m (430 ft)
- System: regional rail
- Manager: Rete Ferroviaria Italiana
- Line: Novara-Alessandria
- Tracks: 2
- Train operators: Trenitalia; Trenord

Construction
- Structure type: at-grade
- Parking: available

Other information
- Status: Unstaffed
- Classification: Bronze
- Website: https://www.rfi.it/it/stazioni/garbagna.html

History
- Opened: 1884
Location
- Location within Garbagna Novarese

Garbagna Novarese railway station is a railway stop on the Novara-Alessandria line, between Novara and Vespolate stations. It serves the village of Garbagna Novarese.

== History ==
=== 19th century ===
The Novara-Alessandria railway line reached Garbagna Novarese in 1851, when it was crossed by a simple level crossing near the Oratorio di Santa Maria.

Only in 1862 the municipal administration requested a railway station from the railway management authority. The station was opened on November 24, 1884.

The current sources do not report the construction date of the station; it is generally referred to as a railway stop until 1894.

The presence of a roadman's house is documented since 1896.

=== 20th century ===
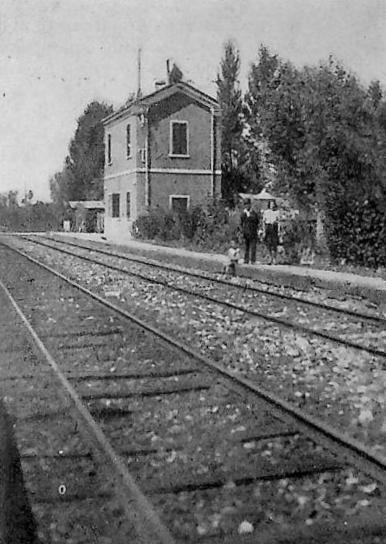
The station in the first half of the 20th century

The station was temporarily equipped with a telegraph during the works to double the track on the Novara-Mortara section, between 1907 and 2 April 1909.

The first document that explicitly mentions station and passenger building is a 1948 plan, available in the Fondazione FS Italiane archives. According to the plan, the building had entrances on the short sides and was not equipped with a canopy or balcony. This description was valid at least until 1955. After the expansion works, the surface area reached 70 m^{2}, together with 55 m^{2} of the apartment.

=== 21st century ===
In 2015/2016 it was the only unstaffed station (i.e. fully operational, but without staff) on the Novara-Alessandria line.

In February 2022, the redevelopment works on the structure began. They included the construction of a pedestrian overpass — to eliminate the need to cross the tracks at ground level —, the expansion of sidewalks and parking area and the related lighting, all at the expense of Rete Ferroviaria Italiana. The pedestrian overpass was activated on September 1, 2024.

== Bibliography ==
- Rete Ferroviaria Italiana (December 1, 2003). "Fascicolo Linea 13" [Line 13 file] (PDF). Rete Ferroviaria Italiana (in Italian).
- Rete Ferroviaria Italiana (2025). "Garbagna". Rete Ferroviaria Italiana (in Italian).
