= Sozzago =

- Comune
- Comune di Sozzago
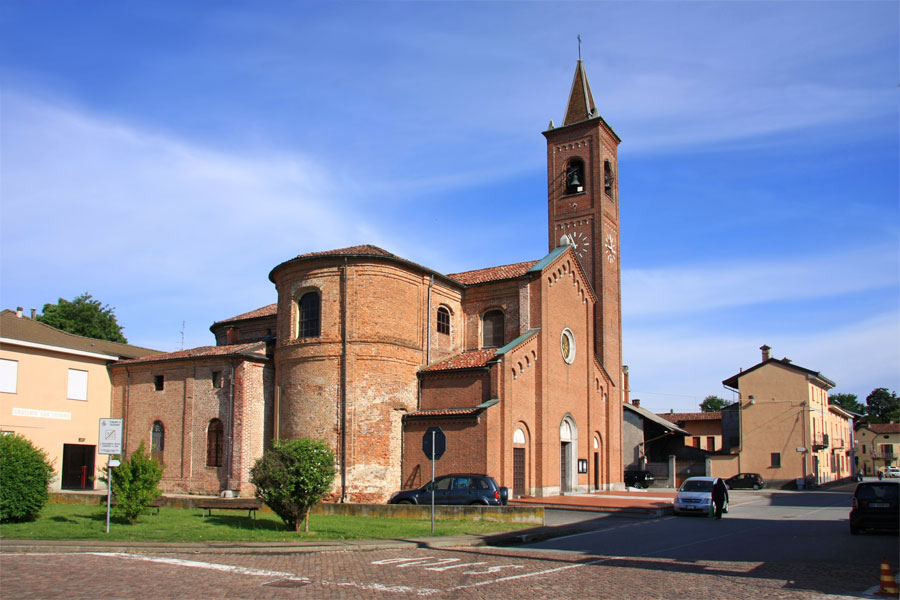
- View of Sozzago

- Coat of arms

- Location within Italy Location within Piedmont
- Coordinates: 45°24′N 8°43′E
- Country: Italy
- Region: Piedmont
- Province: Novara (NO)

Area
  - Total: 12.9 km^{2} (5.0 sq mi)

Population (Dec. 2004)
  - Total: 953
  - Density: 73.9/km^{2} (191/sq mi)
- Time zone: UTC+1 (CET)
  - Summer (DST): UTC+2 (CEST)
- Postal code: 28060
- Dialing code: 0321

Sozzago (Piedmontese: Sosach) is a comune (municipality) in the province of Novara in the Italian region Piedmont, located about 90 kilometres (56 mi) northeast of Turin and about 10 kilometres (6 mi) southeast of Novara.

Sozzago borders the following municipalities: Cassolnovo, Cerano, Garbagna Novarese, Terdobbiate, and Trecate.

== Demographic evolution ==
Historical population

Year	Pop.	±%
1861	1,138	—
1871	1,240	+9.0%
1881	1,385	+11.7%
1901	1,375	−0.7%
1911	1,396	+1.5%

Year	Pop.	±%
1921	1,428	+2.3%
1931	1,224	−14.3%
1936	1,172	−4.2%
1951	1,165	−0.6%
1961	1,108	−4.9%

Year	Pop.	±%
1971	875	−21.0%
1981	694	−20.7%
1991	732	+5.5%
2001	859	+17.3%

Source: Data from ISTAT
