= Terdobbiate =

- Comune
- Comune di Terdobbiate
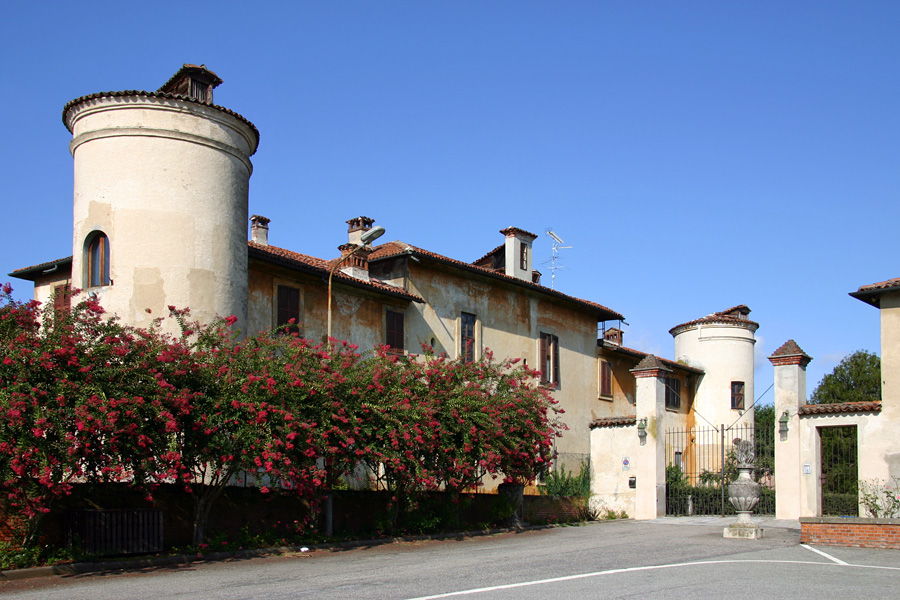
- View of Terdobbiate

- Location within Italy Location within Piedmont
- Coordinates: 45°23′N 8°42′E
- Country: Italy
- Region: Piedmont
- Province: Novara (NO)

Government
  - Mayor: Domenico Merisi

Area
  - Total: 8.5 km^{2} (3.3 sq mi)
- Elevation: 128 m (420 ft)

Population (Dec. 2004)
  - Total: 465
  - Density: 55/km^{2} (140/sq mi)
- Time zone: UTC+1 (CET)
  - Summer (DST): UTC+2 (CEST)
- Postal code: 28070
- Dialing code: 0321
- Website: Official website

Terdobbiate is a comune (municipality) in the Province of Novara in the Italian region Piedmont, located about 90 kilometres (56 mi) northeast of Turin and about 10 kilometres (6 mi) southeast of Novara.

Terdobbiate borders the following municipalities: Cassolnovo, Garbagna Novarese, Nibbiola, Sozzago, Tornaco, and Vespolate.
