= Palazzo Caroelli =

Building in Garbagna Novarese, Province of Novara, Italy

Caroelli Palace
- Palazzo Caroelli
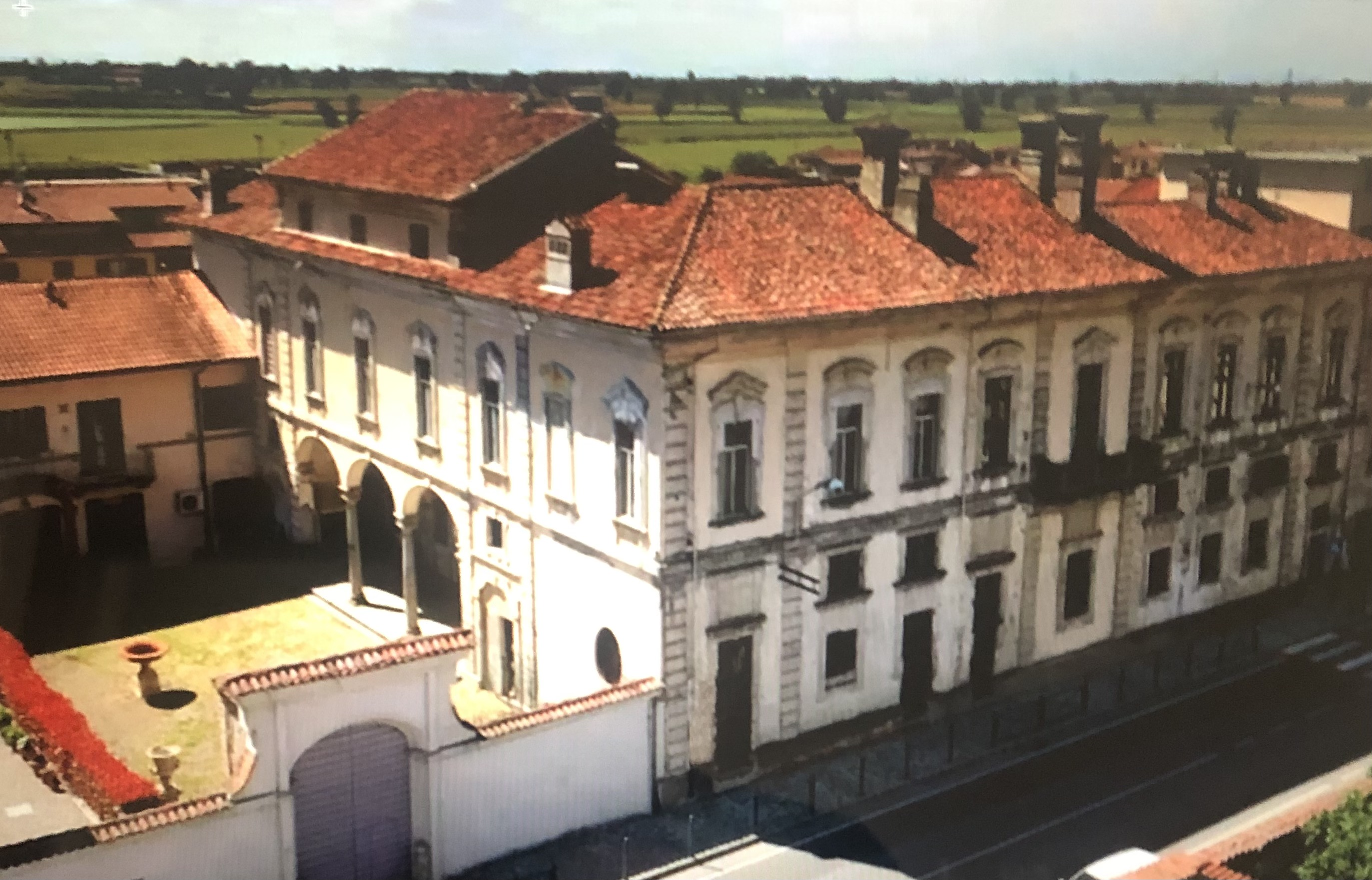
- Interactive map of the Caroelli Palace area

General information
- Type: countryard residence
- Architectural style: Baroque
- Location: Via Matteotti, 21-25, Garbagna Novarese, Italy
- Coordinates: 45.3859°N 8.6600°E
- Inaugurated: 18th century
- Client: Caroelli Family

Technical details
- Floor count: 4

Palazzo Caroelli (Caroelli Palace) is a building in Garbagna Novarese.

== History ==
The palace dates back to the 17th or 18th century and is an example of Baroque architecture. It was the country residence of the Caroelli counts, feudal lords of Vespolate and Garbagna Novarese.

The Caroellis later sold the building to the Moretti family of Milan: in the early 1840s it was the property of Enea Moretti.

A century later Ernesto Colli reports it as belonging to the Buslacchi family and in 1978 to the Costadone family.

== Location ==
Location of the building in Garbagna

The building is located within a block bordered to the east by Via Matteotti, to the south by Via Chiesa, to the north by Via Scuole, and to the west by a system of private roads, some of which are used by the building itself. The block forms the southernmost branch of the historic center (the ancient core, in documents) of Garbagna and includes other buildings.

== Description ==
The building has an L-shaped plan, composed of a substantially rectangular building with the main side (public façade) facing east; another building, also substantially rectangular, is grafted onto this wing at 90°. The latter constitutes the private sector of the ancient residence, with a façade featuring a portico on the ground floor. In front of the southern wing is a quadrangular courtyard with access from Via Matteotti via a gate. The external area (garden) starts from the junction between the east and south buildings, with free development in a north and west direction.

=== Façade ===
The facade is divided longitudinally: the lower part is more sober and consists of a ground floor and a mezzanine, the upper part has a central balcony and curvilinear mouldings above the windows.

The eastern facade is defined by a moulded cornice with monumental chimneys, on two levels, and is punctuated by rustate lesenes. In the lower part there are simply framed windows, while in the upper part, in addition to the aforementioned balcony, the openings are decorated with curvilinear friezes. This side of the building, overlooking the main road of the village, is completed by the surrounding wall, in which a driveway is created, defined by a frame and two hints of volutes on the sides.

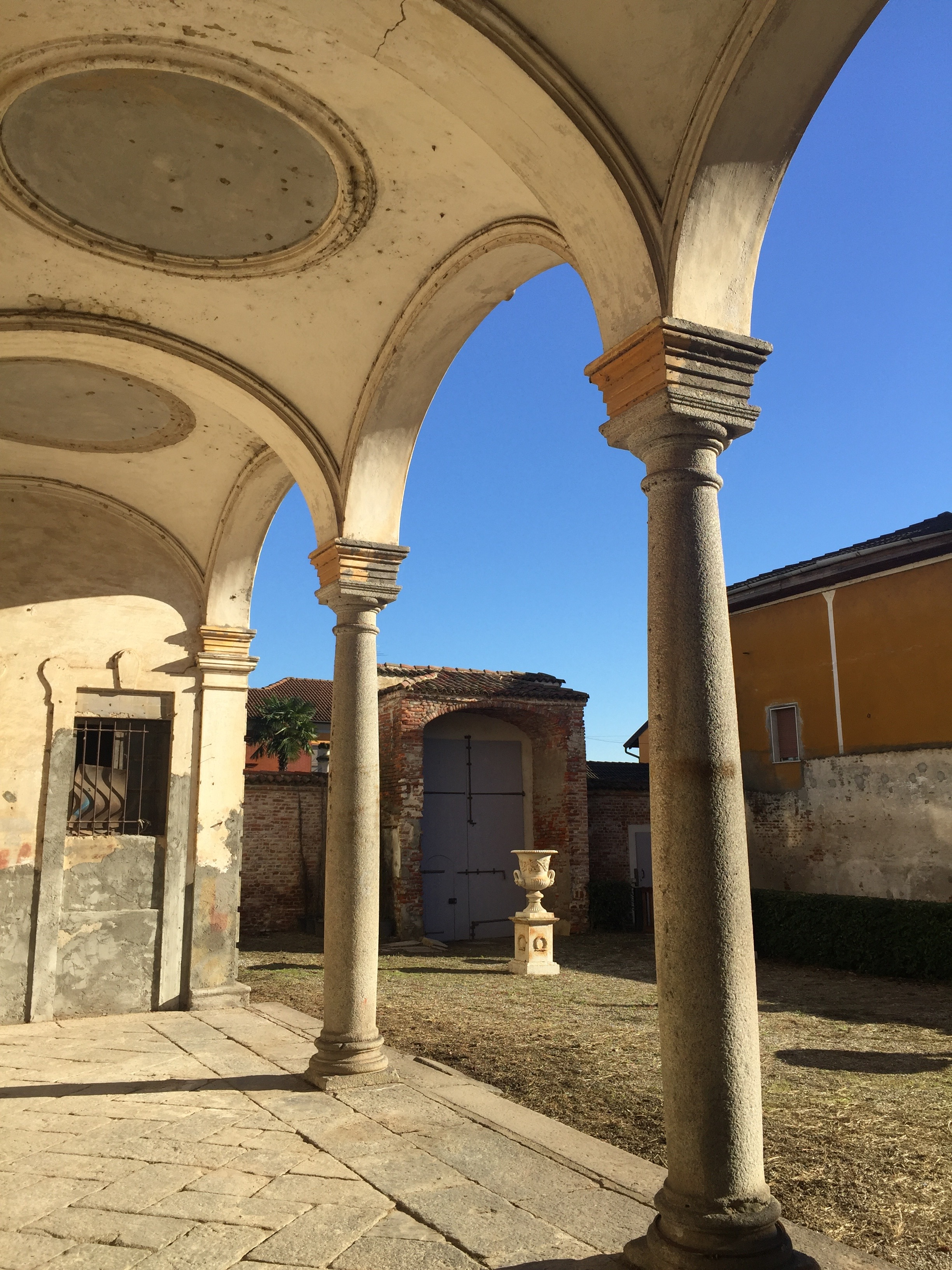
Internal colonnade and courtyard

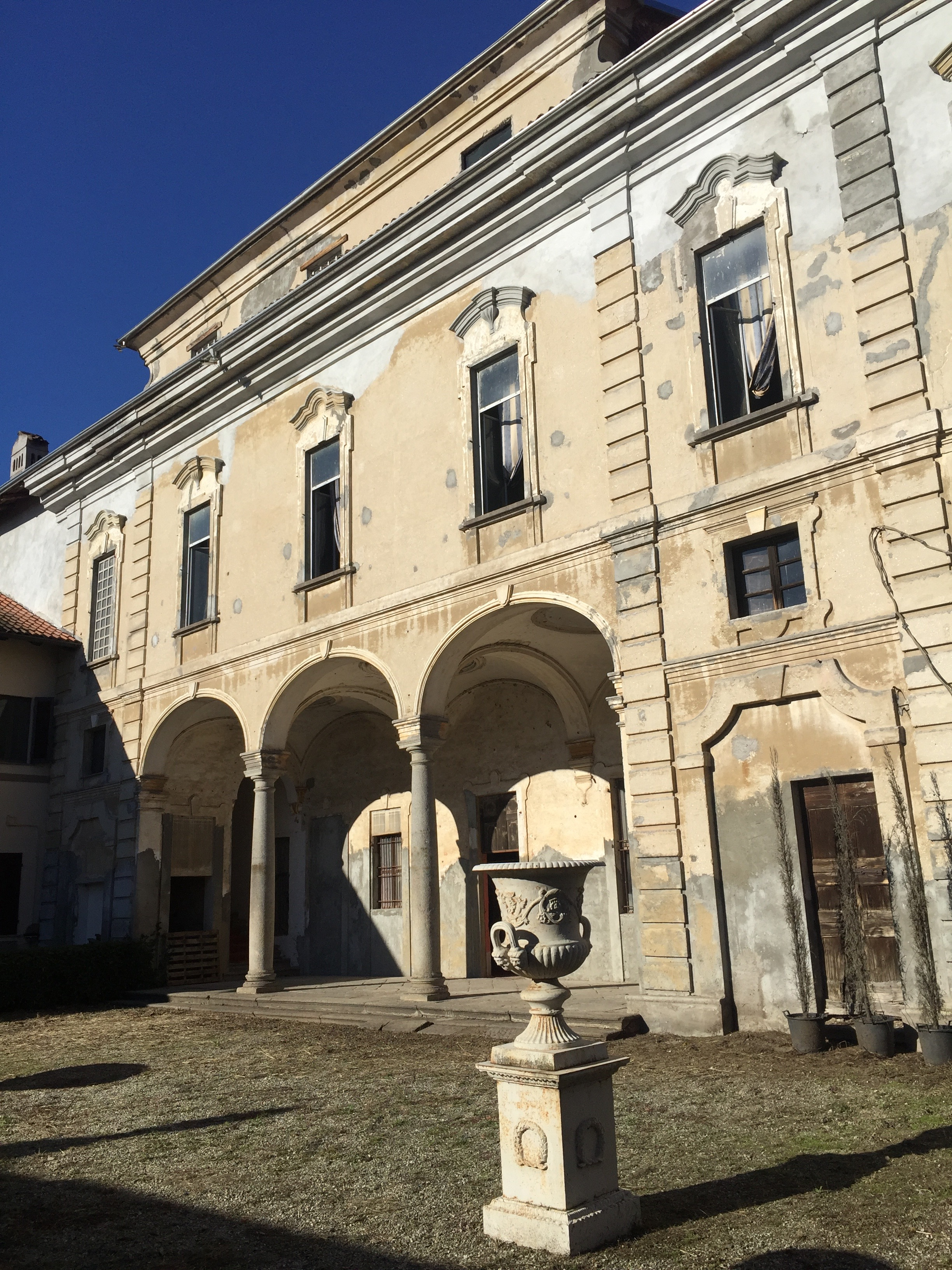
Internal facade

=== Portico ===
On the south side, there is a large portico with segmental arches supported by stone columns, in a simple style. The portico overlooks the internal courtyard, which once housed the service wings, now replaced by more recent buildings. The keep's roof is topped by two stone pine cones. From the portico, a grand staircase decorated with a wrought-iron railing leads to the upper floor.

=== Interior ===
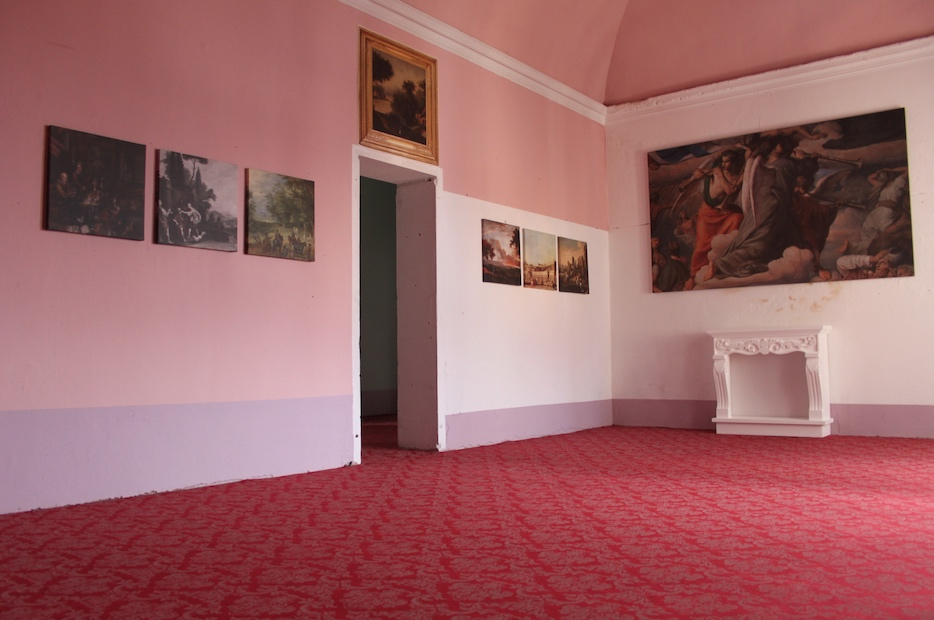
Internal room on the main floor, art gallery

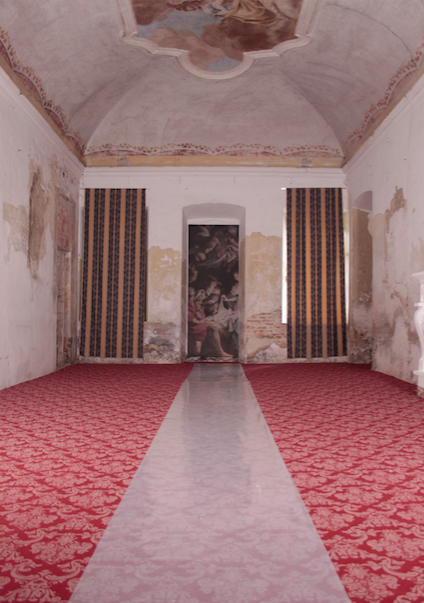
Frescoed hall on the ground floor

Inside, the rooms on the upper floor, originally reserved for the owners, are decorated with frescoes and stuccos in the Baroque style. These rooms retain their original elegance: they all open onto a central hall adorned with stuccos and frescoes with allegorical subjects on the ceiling and landscapes on the walls. The other rooms also have decorated ceilings, although the subjects are difficult to interpret.

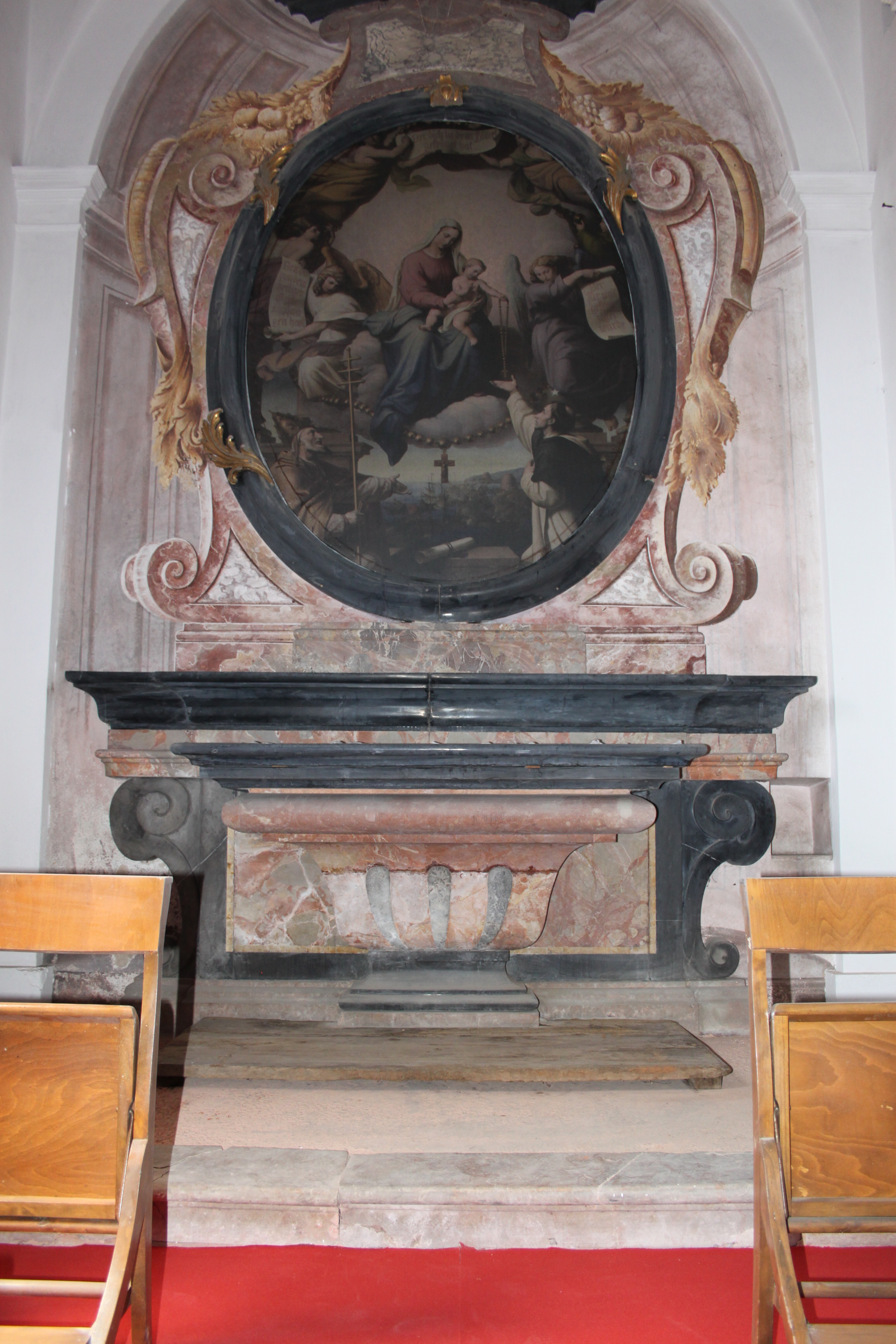
Detail of the private chapel

=== Oratory ===
Inside, on the lower floor, in addition to the large hall, there is a small church dedicated to Saint John of Nepomuk. The building has a single nave with a marble altar and altarpiece. The altarpiece is now devoid of the painted panel that adorned it in the 18th century, when it was visited by the bishop of Novara, Marco Aurelio Balbis Bertone, during his visit on April 18, 1762. Church officials' reports state that in the 18th century, this oratory opened onto the street through a door, had decent vaults, was paved, whitewashed, and had an apse decorated with sacred images. The building was illuminated by a south-facing stained glass window. The marble altarpiece was enriched by a painted canvas depicting the Blessed Virgin and Saint John of Nepomuk, the saint to whom the church is dedicated.

== Caroelli family ==
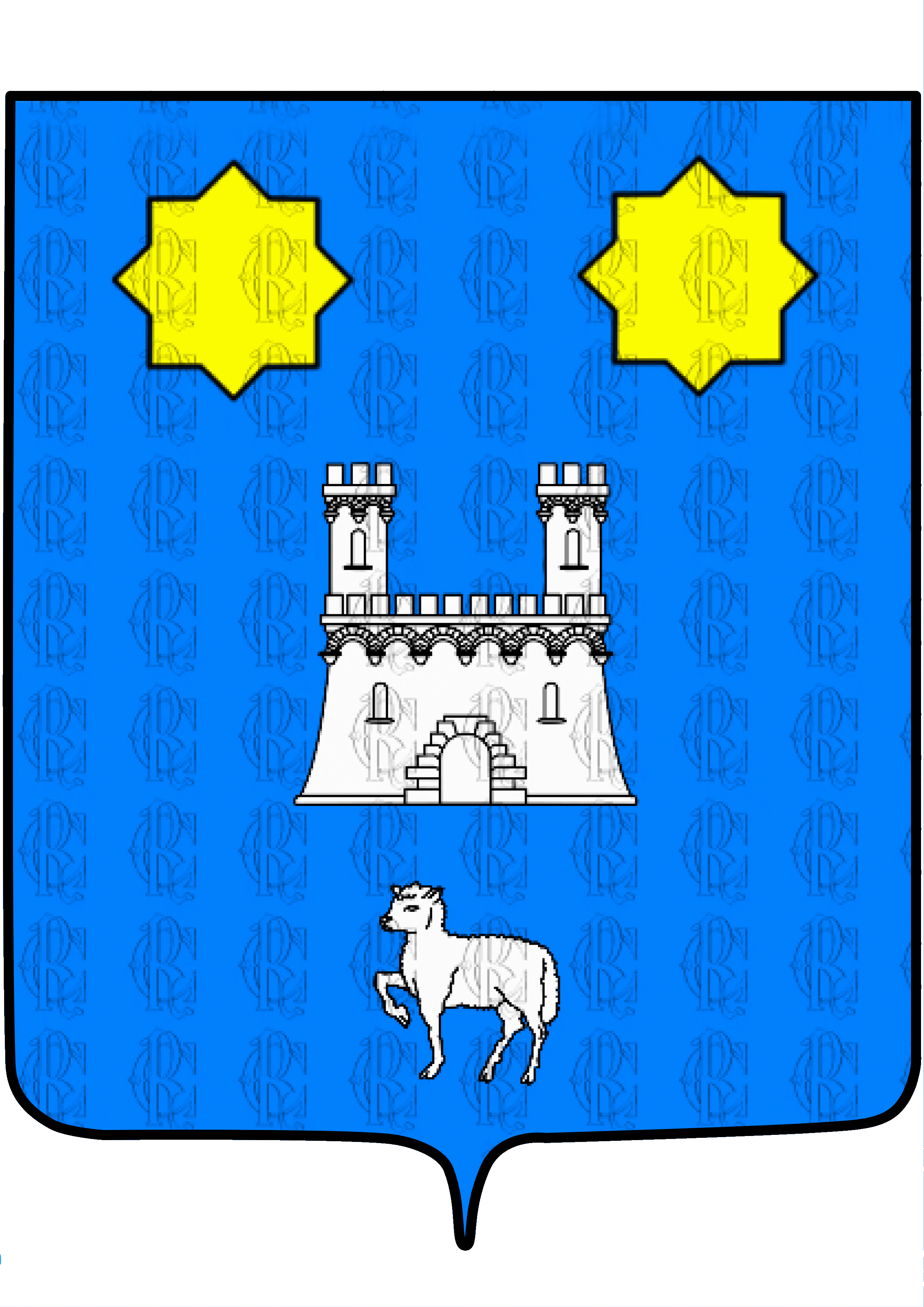
Caroelli's coat of arms: shield with a blue background with a silver castle surmounted by two gold stars, at the base a silver lamb passant

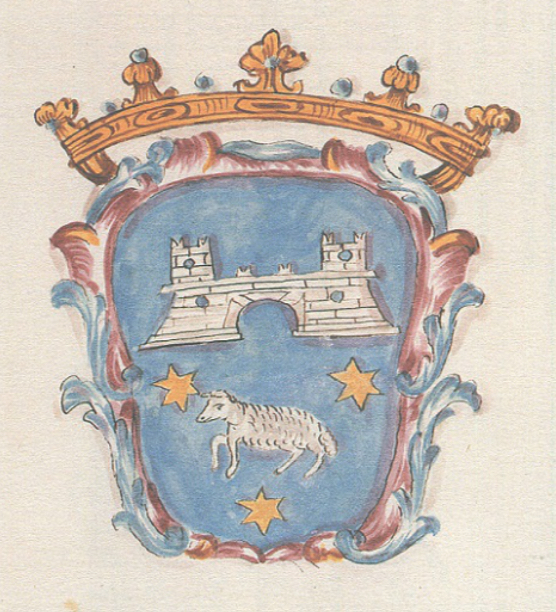
Caroelli's coat of arms in a fresco

The Caroelli family originally lived between Galliate and Romentino. Its members were classified as dominus and were spice merchants, priests, or doctors.

Regarding heraldry, Antonio Manno reports:

- coat of arms: Azure with a silver castle accompanied, at the head by two gold stars; at the tip by a silver lamb;
- crest: Black eagle, beaked, and black-limbed, red-tongued.

=== Giovanni Andrea ===
Giovanni Andrea was a wholesale rice and grain merchant. In 1612, he married Anna Gallina, the daughter of merchants, confirming the family's commercial vocation.

=== Alessandro ===
Alessandro, son of Giovanni Andrea, initially operated in the same business as his father. The wealth he accumulated allowed him to secure the Contado's Treasury contract from 1625 to 1635 and from 1646 to 1647. This allowed him to significantly increase his wealth.

Until the late 1650s, war and the need to maintain the army weighed heavily on Milan state's economy. In the countryside, the resulting taxation caused many problems for families, who were often forced into debt to meet the payments. Instead, it benefited tax collectors, like the Caroellis, who reaped enormous profits. The Contado opposed this state of affairs, filing a lawsuit against Alessandro, but it was to no avail, as it was conveniently hushed up in Milan, thanks to the connections Caroelli had managed to build in powerful circles. He was then able to continue his activities and consolidate his position by entering the highly lucrative Rimplazzo business.

In 1637, Alessandro married Veronica Bagliotti, a member of the city's aristocracy, at great expense, precisely to signal his "ennoblement." Veronica was the sister of Margherita, married to the collegiate physicist Francesco Gallarati, and of Antonia, wife of the collegiate physicist Achille Avogadro.

His son Paolo Antonio was also the manager of the Rimplazzo in the 1640s. His daughter Arcangela married Carlo Francesco Massea from Finale Ligure.

=== Luigi ===
Placido Luigi, son of Alessandro, studied law in Pavia and was a respected jurist in both Milan and Novara. Among his many offices and honors, he was named decurion of Novara and count of the fiefdom of Vespolate (Novara) in 1715.

=== Giuseppe Urbico ===
Giuseppe Urbico, Alessandro's brother, embraced a career in the church, graduated in law from Parma, and was appointed canon of San Gaudenzio. This last step was possible thanks to the influence of his brother, who requested a recommendation directly from Pope Innocent XI, former bishop of Novara, and from Senator Giovanni Pietro Stampa, a citizen of Novara. Stampa was, among other things, the Caroellis' lawyer in the case against the Contado.

== Image gallery ==
=== Ground floor ===
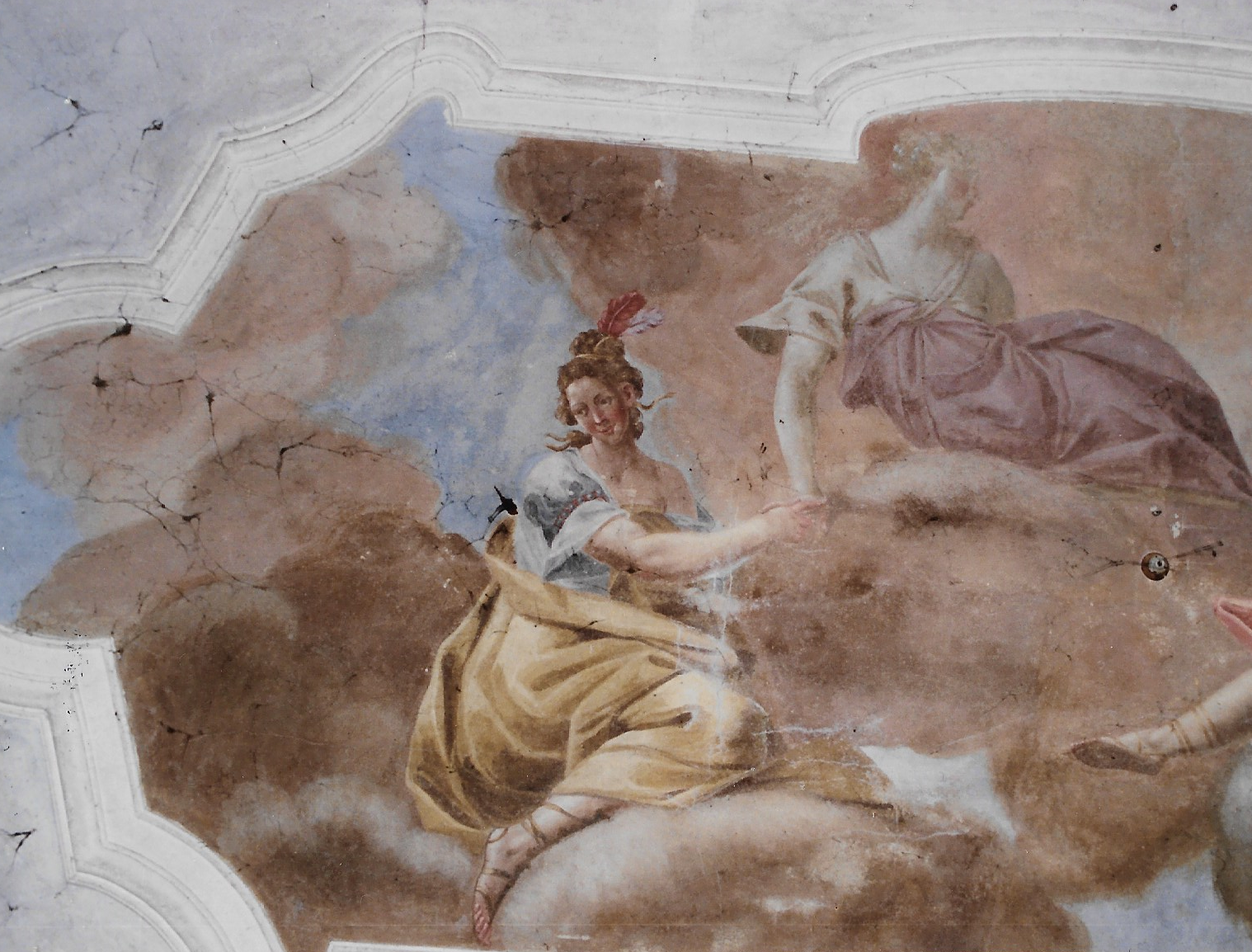
Fresco on the ceiling of the hall - Right side

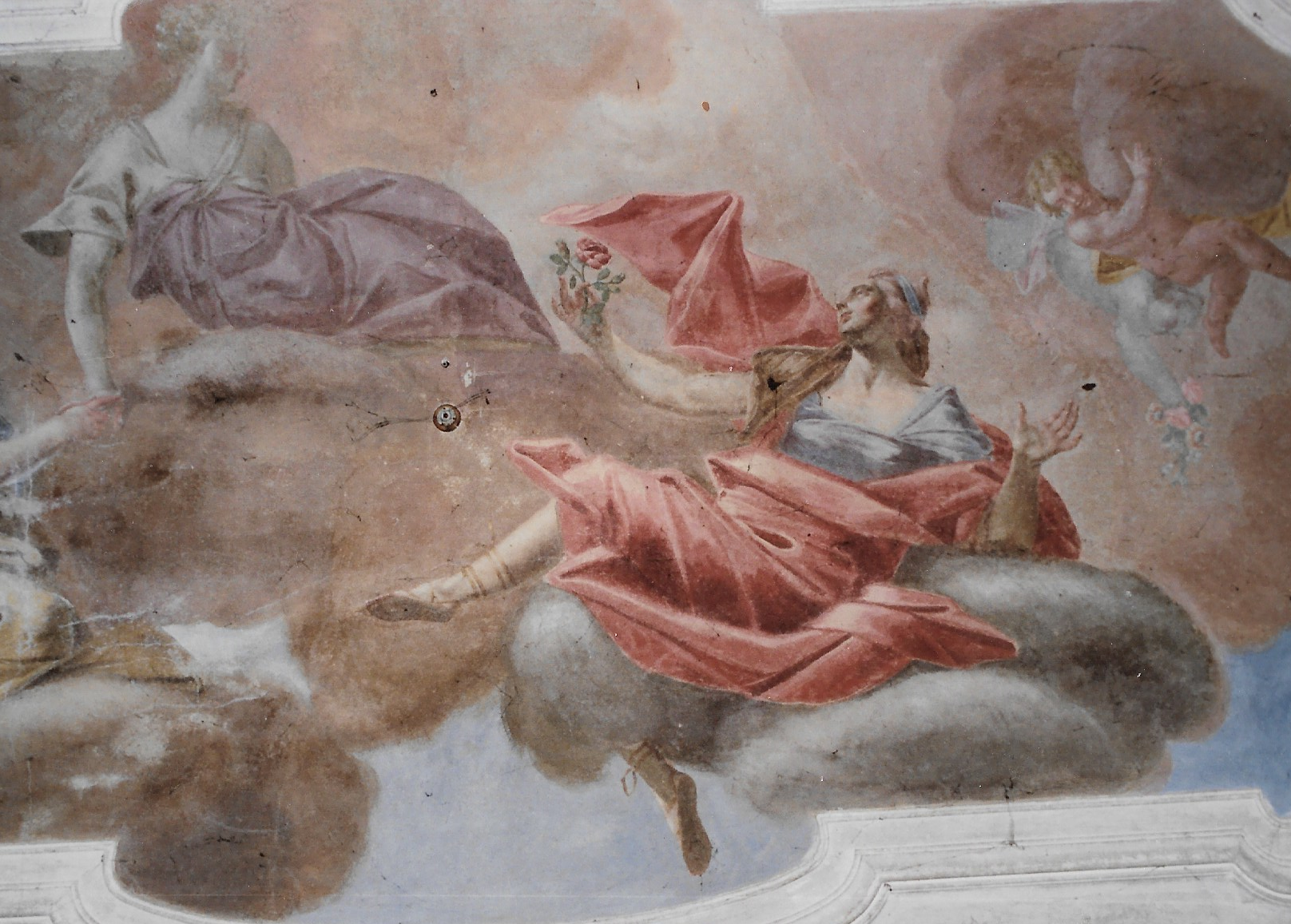
Fresco on the ceiling of the hall - Left side

=== First floor ===
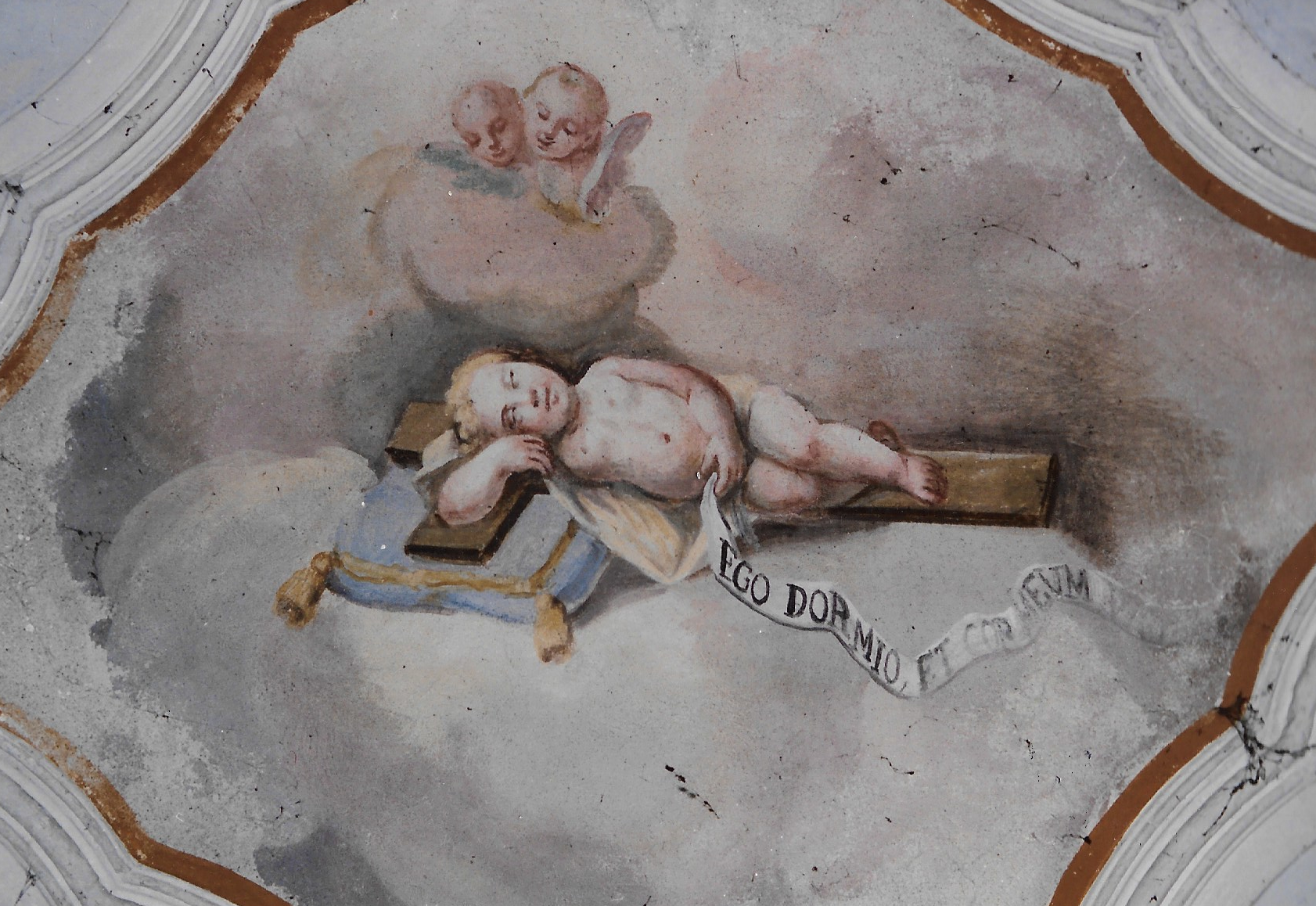
Children's bedroom ceiling fresco

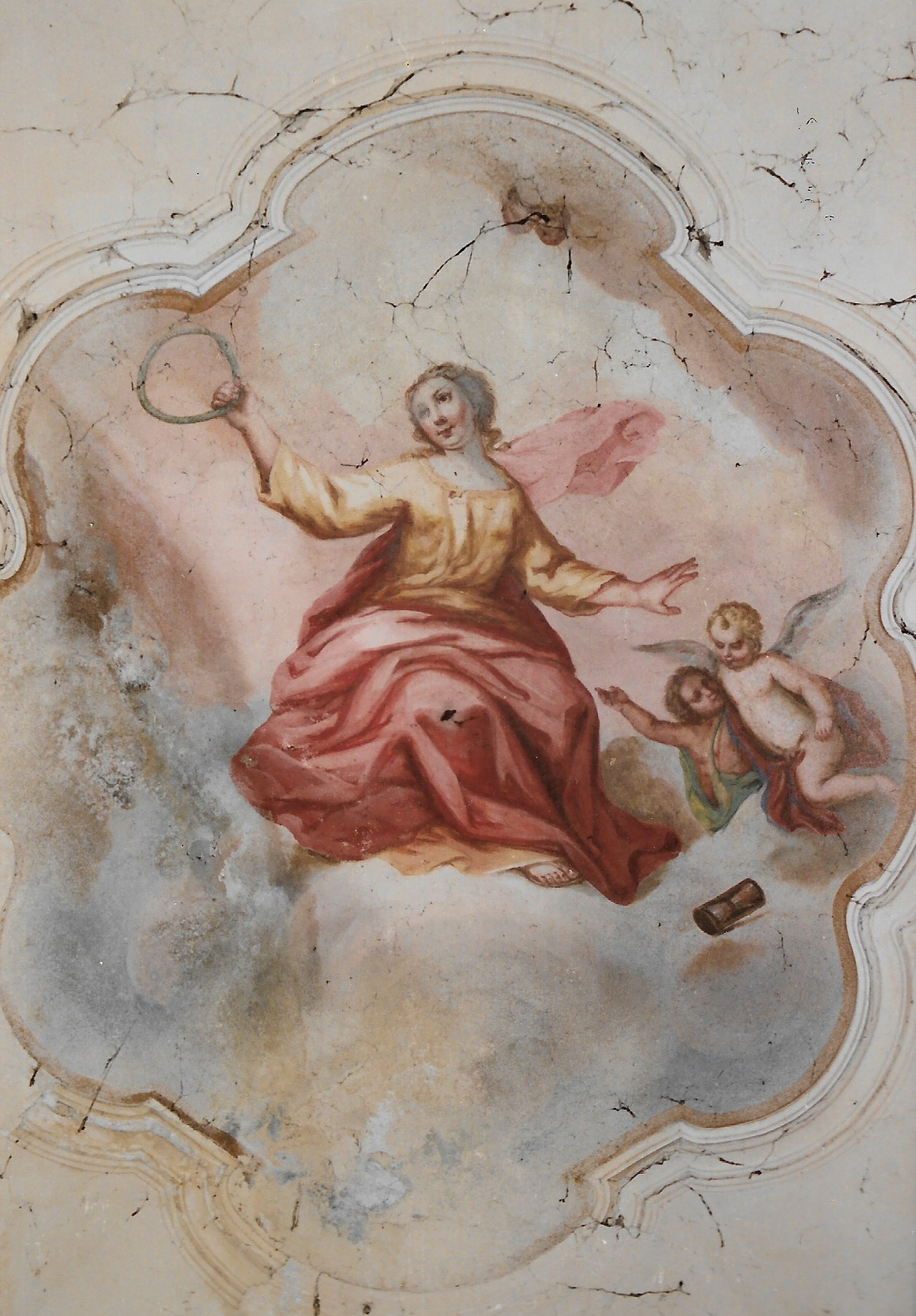
Bedroom ceiling fresco

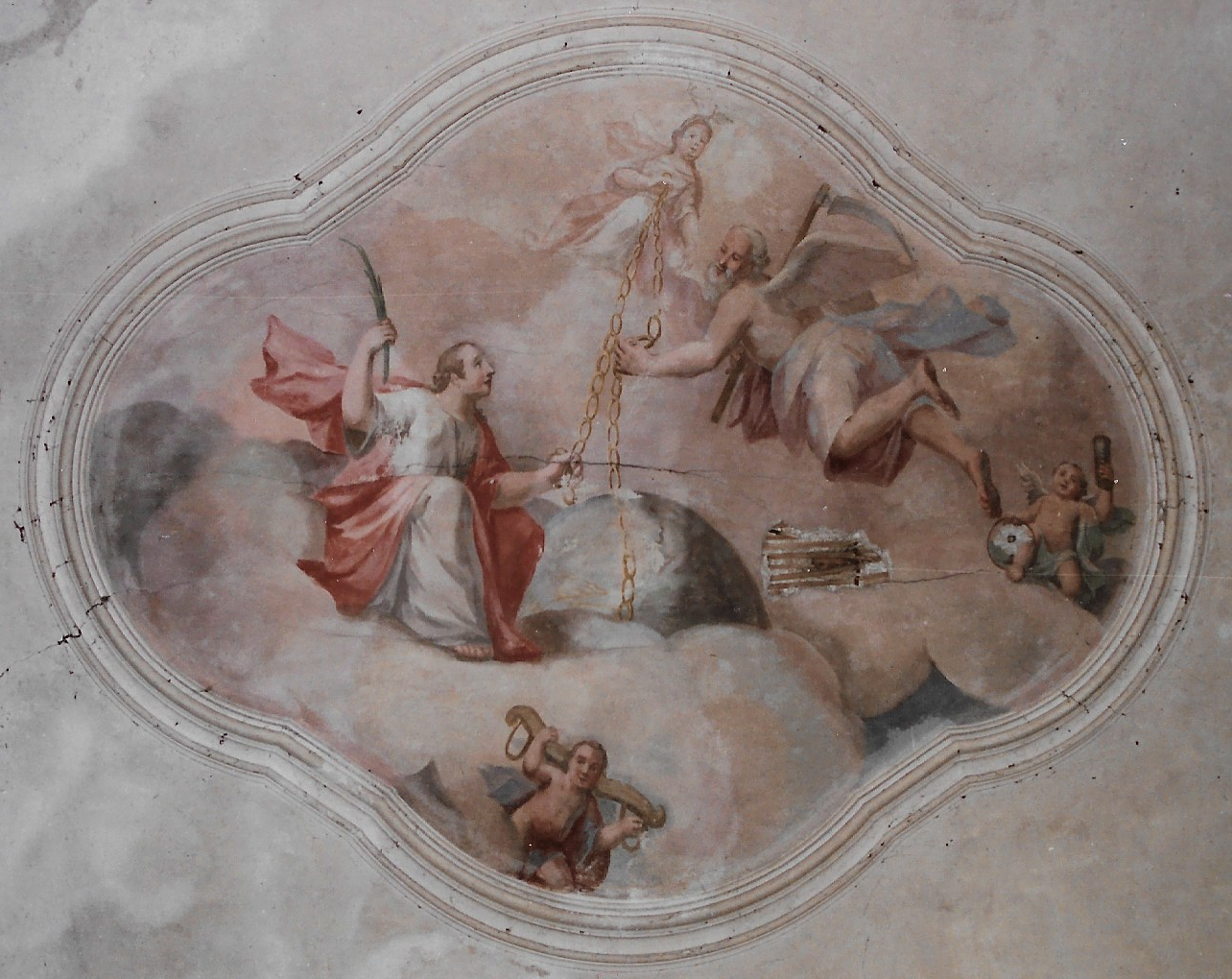
Living room ceiling fresco

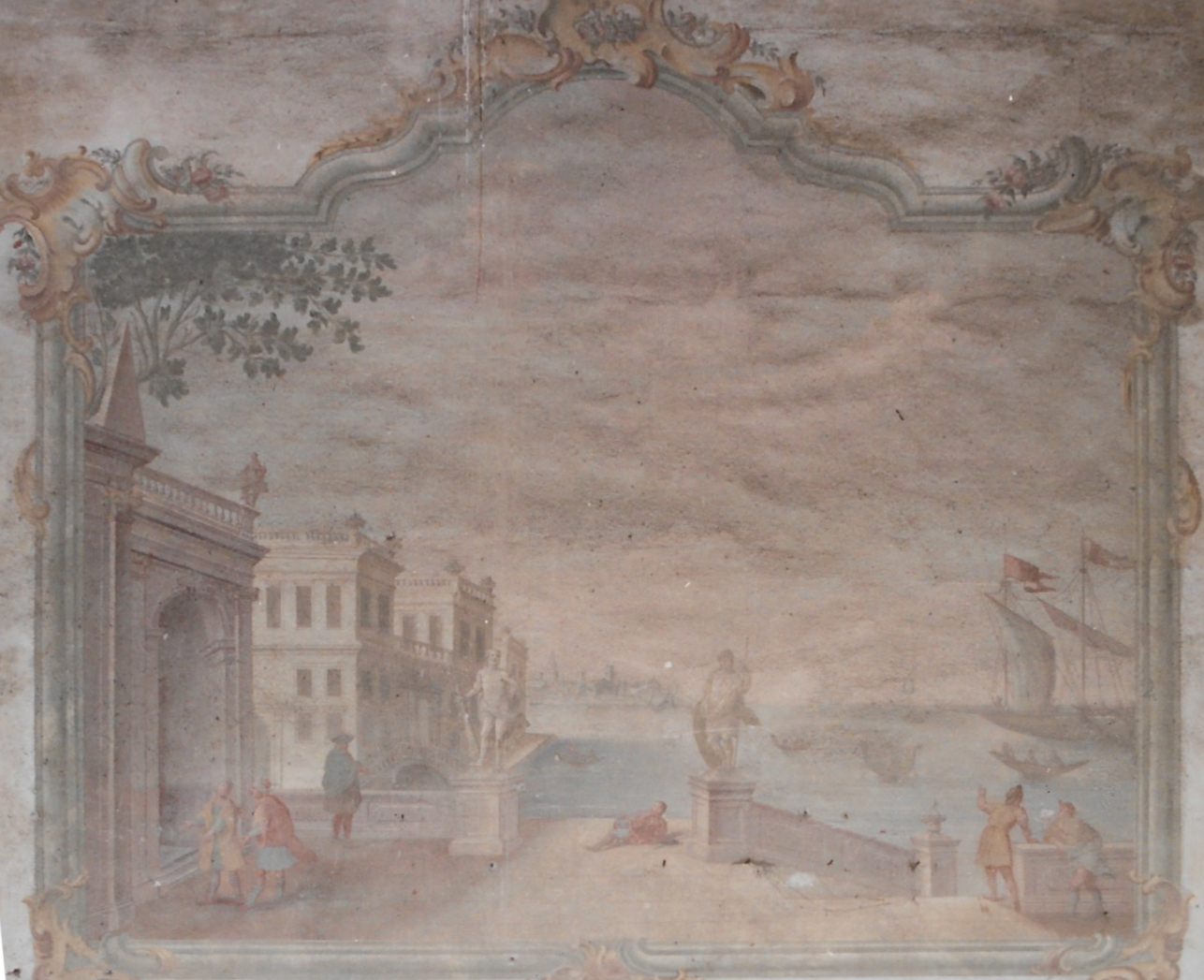
Living room fresco

=== Chapel ===
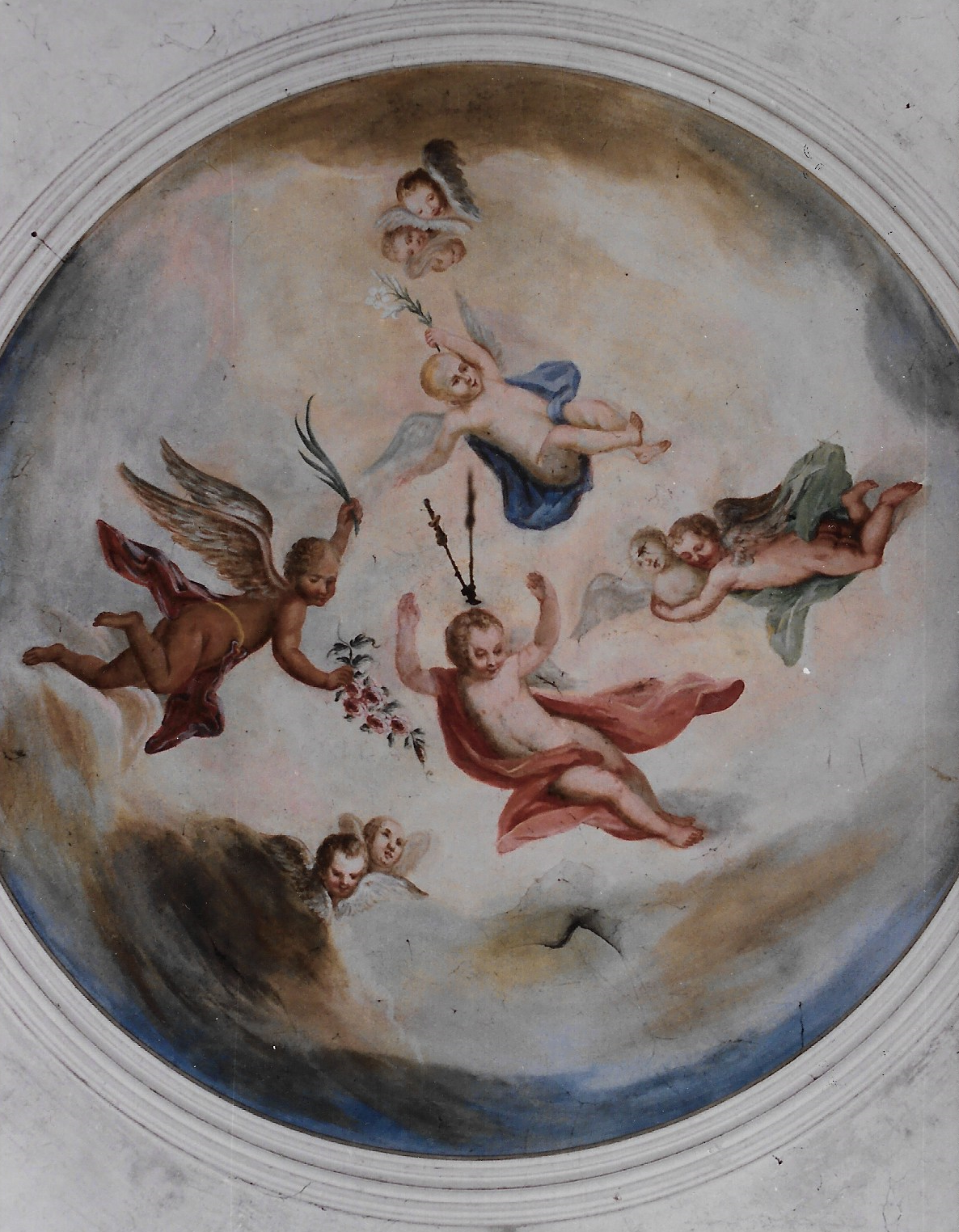
Ceiling fresco

== See also ==
- History of Garbagna Novarese

== Bibliography ==
- Cassani, Lino; Colli, Ernesto (1948). Memorie storiche di Garbagna Novarese [Historical memories of Garbagna Novarese] (in Italian). Novara: Pietro Riva & C – via Foto Emilio Alzati.
