= Tornaco, Piedmont =

Tornaco
- Comune
- Comune di Tornaco
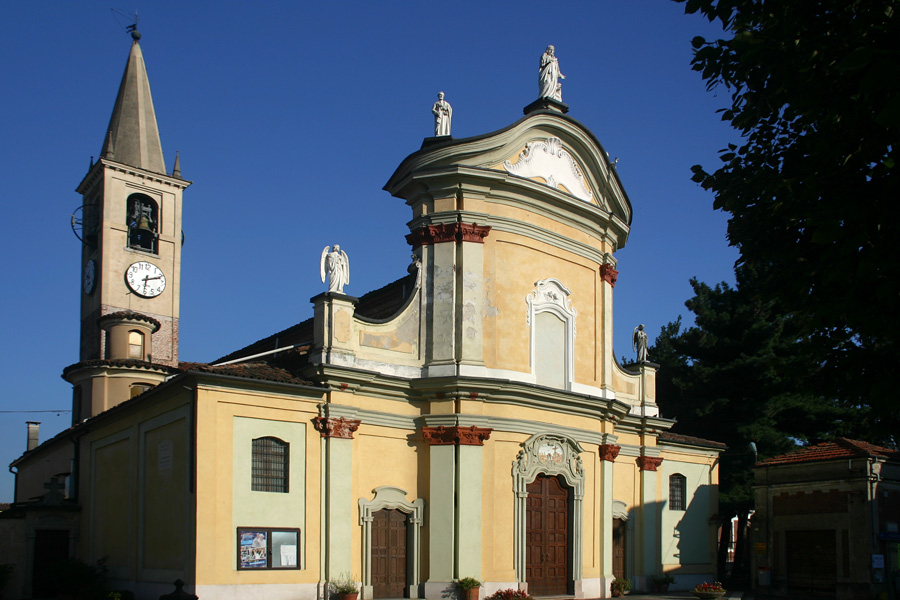
- Parish church, Tornaco

- Location within Italy Location within Piedmont
- Coordinates: 45°21′N 8°43′E
- Country: Italy
- Region: Piedmont
- Province: Province of Novara (NO)
- Frazioni: Vignarello

Government
  - Mayor: Giovanni Caldarelli (Civic list:Unione per Tornaco)

Area
  - Total: 13.3 km^{2} (5.1 sq mi)
- Elevation: 122 m (400 ft)

Population (Dec. 2019)
  - Total: 932
  - Density: 70.1/km^{2} (181/sq mi)
- Time zone: UTC+1 (CET)
  - Summer (DST): UTC+2 (CEST)
- Postal code: 28070
- Dialing code: 0321
- Patron saint: St. Mary Magdalene
- Saint day: 22nd July
- Website: www.comune.tornaco.no.it

Tornaco is a comune (municipality) in the Province of Novara in the Italian region Piedmont, located about 90 kilometres (56 mi) northeast of Turin and about 14 kilometres (9 mi) southeast of Novara. As of 31 December 2019, it had a population of 932 and an area of 13.3 square kilometres (5.1 mi^{2}).

Tornaco borders the following municipalities: Borgolavezzaro, Cassolnovo, Cilavegna, Gravellona Lomellina, Terdobbiate, and Vespolate.

== Demographic evolution ==
Historical population

Year	Pop.	±%
1861	1,499	—
1871	1,653	+10.3%
1881	1,897	+14.8%
1901	2,085	+9.9%
1911	2,042	−2.1%

Year	Pop.	±%
1921	1,844	−9.7%
1931	1,539	−16.5%
1936	1,481	−3.8%
1951	1,460	−1.4%
1961	1,296	−11.2%

Year	Pop.	±%
1971	1,030	−20.5%
1981	906	−12.0%
1991	839	−7.4%
2001	878	+4.6%
2019	932	+6.2%

Source: Data from ISTAT
