= Cassolnovo =

- Comune
- Comune di Cassolnovo
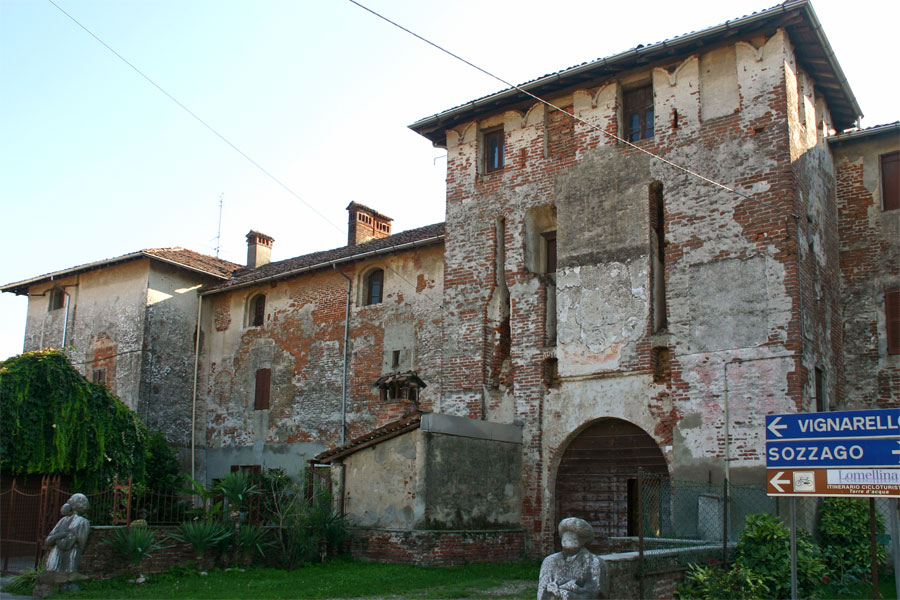

- Coat of arms

- Location within Italy Location within Lombardy
- Coordinates: 45°22′N 8°48′E
- Country: Italy
- Region: Lombardy
- Province: Province of Pavia (PV)

Area
  - Total: 32.0 km^{2} (12.4 sq mi)

Population (Dec. 2004)
  - Total: 6,203
  - Density: 194/km^{2} (502/sq mi)
- Demonym: Cassolesi
- Time zone: UTC+1 (CET)
  - Summer (DST): UTC+2 (CEST)
- Postal code: 27023
- Dialing code: 0381

Cassolnovo (Cassö in lombard) is a comune (municipality) in the Province of Pavia in the Italian region Lombardy, located about 30 km (19 mi) southwest of Milan and about 35 km (22 mi) northwest of Pavia. As of 31 December 2004, it had a population of 6,203 and an area of 32.0 km^{2} (12.4 sq mi).

Cassolnovo borders the following municipalities: Abbiategrasso, Cerano, Gravellona Lomellina, Sozzago, Terdobbiate, Tornaco, Vigevano.

== People ==
- Gaspare Campari (1828–1882) creator of Campari

== Demographic evolution ==
Historical population

Year	Pop.	±%
1861	5,358	—
1871	5,563	+3.8%
1881	5,781	+3.9%
1901	7,244	+25.3%
1911	7,323	+1.1%

Year	Pop.	±%
1921	6,321	−13.7%
1931	6,252	−1.1%
1936	6,131	−1.9%
1951	6,271	+2.3%
1961	6,513	+3.9%

Year	Pop.	±%
1971	6,211	−4.6%
1981	5,706	−8.1%
1991	5,571	−2.4%
2001	5,820	+4.5%
2011	7,116	+22.3%

Source: Data from ISTAT
