= San Michele Arcangelo, Garbagna Novarese =

Parish church in Garbagna Novarese, Province of Novara, Italy

Chiesa di San Michele Arcangelo
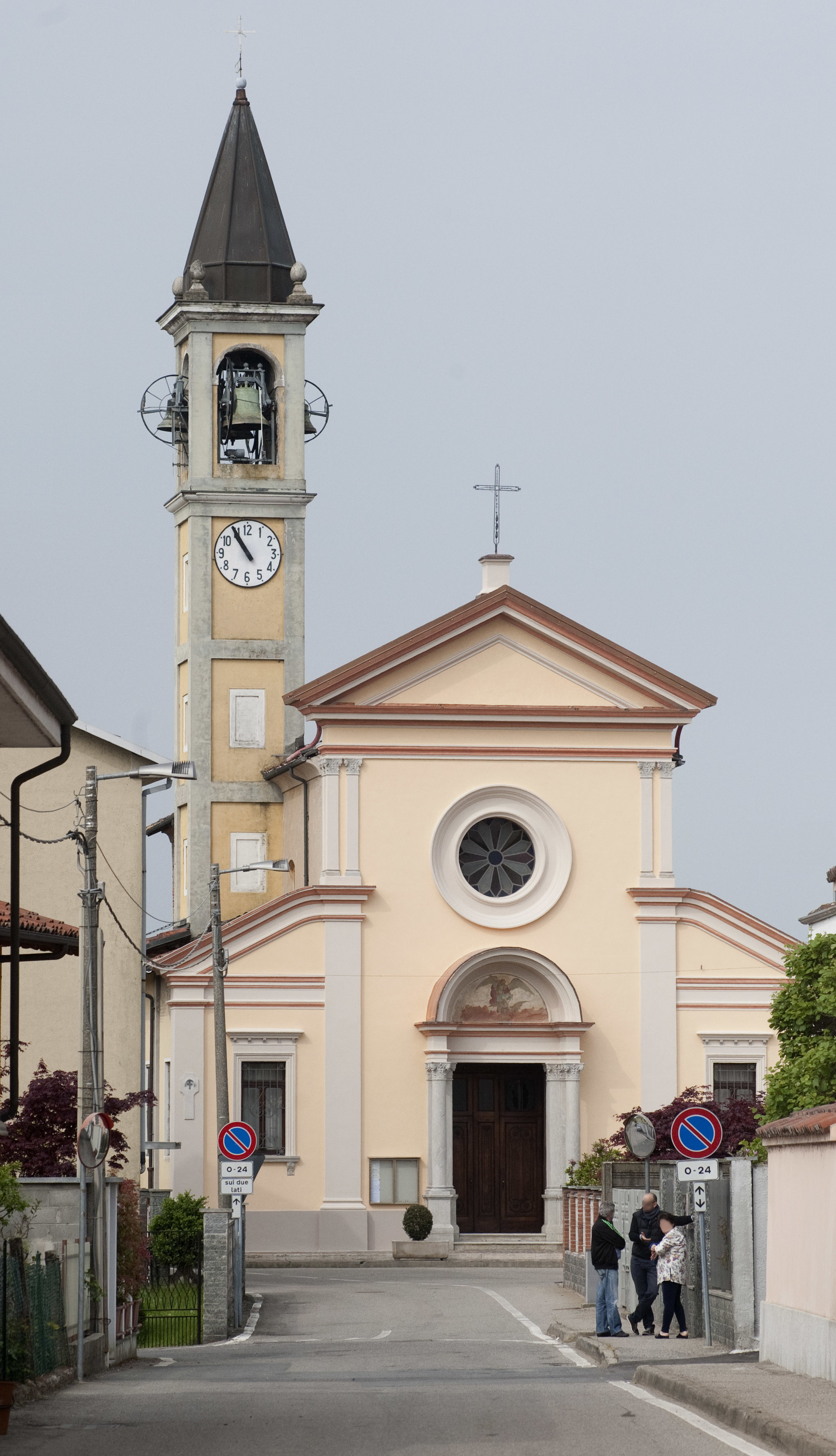

Religion
- Affiliation: Roman Catholic Church
- Province: Novara
- Region: Piedmont
- Patron: Michael (archangel)

Location
- Location: Via alla Chiesa, 12
- Municipality: Garbagna Novarese
- Country: Italy
- Interactive map of Chiesa di San Michele Arcangelo
- Coordinates: 45.38536°N 8.65830°E

Architecture
- Groundbreaking: end 16th century
- Completed: 1899 (expansion)
- Direction of façade: East

Chiesa di San Michele Arcangelo (Church of Saint Michael Archangel) is the parish church of Garbagna Novarese, in the province and diocese of Novara; it is part of the pastoral unit of Bassa Novarese.

== History ==
=== Origin ===
The original oratory was built by the Lombards, on the site of the previous pagan temple, and dedicated to their patron saint. Although he had no concrete evidence to support this claim, historian Lino Cassani was convinced of it, based on numerous accounts of an 11th-century colony of Lombard landowners in Garbagna, who may have financed its construction. The history of Garbagna itself offers further support for this theory. Until the 11th century, the original nucleus of the town was located farther to the north-east, near the ancient Roman road and the Oratorio di Santa Maria, rather than in the area of the present-day church. Given the Lombard custom of locating cemeteries outside inhabited areas and of building chapels dedicated to Saint Michael nearby — whose role was to weigh souls after death in anticipation of divine judgement — it is highly probable that the original structure had such an origin, and that a cemetery existed nearby from the outset. When the town centre moved to the newly built castle in the late 12th century, the chapel came under its sphere of influence, which undoubtedly increased its importance, eventually leading to its elevation as the parish church of the community. The first mention in historical records dates to 1181.

Very little is known about the building's structure at that time, except that the apse faced east, as was customary in the early centuries of Christianity.

=== 14th century ===
In the 1347 document concerning the investiture of an ecclesiastical benefice (Consignationes), parish priest Uberto Fragonerio reported that the rectory was located adjacent to the church, to the northwest, and that the cemetery lay to the west. Both were protected on the north and east sides by the castle moat, which thus included them within its perimeter. The church also owned another sedimen (a small dwelling) immediately to the east, beyond the moat and bordering the road leading to the church itself. The benefice was completed by 26 plots of land, totalling 240 pertiche, mostly arable or used for forage.

=== 16th-18th century ===
With the growth of the population, its small size made replacement necessary in the late 16th century. The original Lombard building was demolished, and its foundations were reused for the construction of the new one. The report from the pastoral visit of Bishop Carlo Bascapè on May 2, 1596 (when the work was still incomplete), along with the 1618 document concerning the transfer of the parish benefice, provides a detailed description of the new structure: it measured twenty-eight braccia in length (including the choir), twelve in width, and ten in height (one braccio — arm — equates to approximately 60 cm); it consisted of a single nave with a wooden ceiling and a bell tower thirty braccia high, located to the left of the choir. The choir itself was semicircular and, like the earlier structure, faced east. To the north were the clergy house, sacristy, and cemetery; to the east, the access road; to the south, the rectory garden; and to the west, the rectory's vineyard and fields. Inside, the ceiling was painted, and the altar was made of inlaid wood, surmounted by a gilded wooden tabernacle two braccia high, supported by four angels, accompanied by six candlesticks and a small cross.

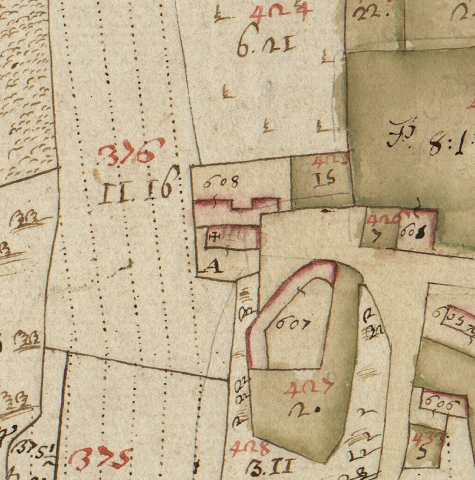
The church depicted in the map of the Teresian Cadastre, 1723, flanked by the clergy house

Quoting the Diocesan Historical Archive, Franca Franzosi reports that in 1669 the church received a donation of relics, and she hypothesizes that among them was a fragment of the Holy Cross.

Several changes were subsequently introduced, as recorded in the 1792 parish report compiled by the curate Giuseppe Tosi. To facilitate access for the faithful, the orientation of the building was reversed: the new entrance was placed to the east, facing the village, while the choir was relocated to the west. Following a land exchange with Count Caroelli in 1748, the count’s property now bordered the church to the north and west, while the cemetery had been moved to the south. The report also notes that the building included a baptistery, had well-maintained, whitewashed and polished interior walls, and a rustic exterior . The original wooden ceiling had been replaced with a masonry vault. The choir featured comfortable seating for both clergy and laypeople, with men and women seated separately. There were no statues — only a few paintings, fully aligned with liturgical norms. Finally, the church housed three altars: the main altar, one dedicated to the Blessed Virgin of Loreto, and one to Saint Raphael.

=== 19th century ===
As the population continued to grow, the building required expansion, which was carried out in the early 19th century. Specifically, the two side aisles were added. As for the interior, records indicate the presence of confessionals and a choir furnished with wooden stalls (seats separated by armrests). Furthermore, in 1832, the city council decided to raise the bell tower by several meters and to replace its tiled roof with a spire. To ensure the stability of the new structure, most of the embrasures were sealed, and the base was reinforced.

Franca Franzosi reports an 1853 inventory confirming the presence of a fragment of the Holy Cross in the church, though it remains unclear when the relic arrived. She herself hypothesizes that its presence may be linked to the cult of Saint Helena, who is depicted in a fresco in the Oratorio di Santa Maria.

Around 1850, a third nave was added adjacent to the bell tower, but the unusual addition—seen as a disfigurement that compromised the building’s symmetry—was poorly received by the population. After several decades of discontent, the municipal administration, under Mayor Carlo Geri, ordered the nave closed during the 1899 renovations, relegating it to a passageway and storage room. During the same renovations, the church was extended by ten meters on the front side, the old façade (which featured a small portico with granite columns and an ancient statue of Saint Michael) was demolished, and a new one was installed. Designed by Novara architect Marcello Zorzoli, the new façade included a lunette above the portal decorated with a fresco of the same saint. Also between 1899 and 1900, a new floor was laid at the expense of the local population, a building was constructed next to the north side of the choir to house the organ on its upper floor, and the entire church was frescoed by Rodolfo Gambini, a painter from Alessandria.

=== 20th century ===
In 1903, a wooden cross was erected in the square in front of the building to commemorate the Holy Missions held between 27 December 1902 and 6 January 1903.

Plan of the church

In 1925, the organ was relocated from the north side of the choir to the rear of the church, above the entrance, on the initiative of parish priest Carlo De Gasperis.

In 1934, to mark the Holy Year, the wooden cross in front of the building was replaced with a granite column.

In his 1948 monograph on Garbagna, Ernesto Colli reported that the old cemetery was located immediately south of the building. By the time of his writing, however, the road leading to the new cemetery had already been built in its place, flanked by a double row of plane trees.

With the decree of 11 October 1986, the church's civil legal personality was transferred to the parish, which was thereby recognised as a civilly acknowledged ecclesiastical entity.

In 1992, thanks to the efforts of local physician Giacomo Perolini and his wife Emma Clavenna — both well-known scholars of local history and art — the 18th-century canvas depicting the patron saint Michael was restored.

In 1996, a group of Garbagna residents undertook a large-scale project of cleaning, enhancement, and conservative restoration of the building, under the direction of parish priest Giovanni Fornaroli and Roberto Fregonara. The restoration of the Lourdes Grotto, carried out by Luigi Casalchini and Giuseppe Facchetti, was part of this initiative and was reopened on October 6.

=== 21st century ===
In 2011 the organ was restored.

In 2013, after a stratigraphic investigation, the facade was renovated by the restorer Federico Barbieri from Pombia.

In addition to religious activities, the church has hosted various musical and singing initiatives over the years, organized by the municipality, the parish, and local volunteer associations (see box Musical and singing activities).

Musical and singing activities
- Among the activities not strictly related to worship, the traditional Christmas concerts stand out. However, various musical and singing initiatives, totally unrelated to the religious sphere, are also remembered, such as: 2001: concert by the "Antonio Vivaldi" choir of Cambiano, at the end of the celebrations for the inauguration of the headquarters of the Alpine Group of Garbagna and the monument to the Alpine troops and the fallen; 2011: Verdi concert by the "Amadeus Kammerchor" choir conducted by Gianmario Cavallaro, with Mirco Godio on the piano; 2020: the CAI choir of Novara remembered the baritone Mario Paracchini, originally from Garbagna and a member of the said choir for over 20 years, under the direction of maestros Sergio Ferrara and Serena Romano; 2022: stop in Garbagna of the show "Dell'Arte Contagiosa", a multidisciplinary study on the life of Dante and his time, starting from the inspiration of the cantos of the Divine Comedy.

== Description ==
=== Exterior ===
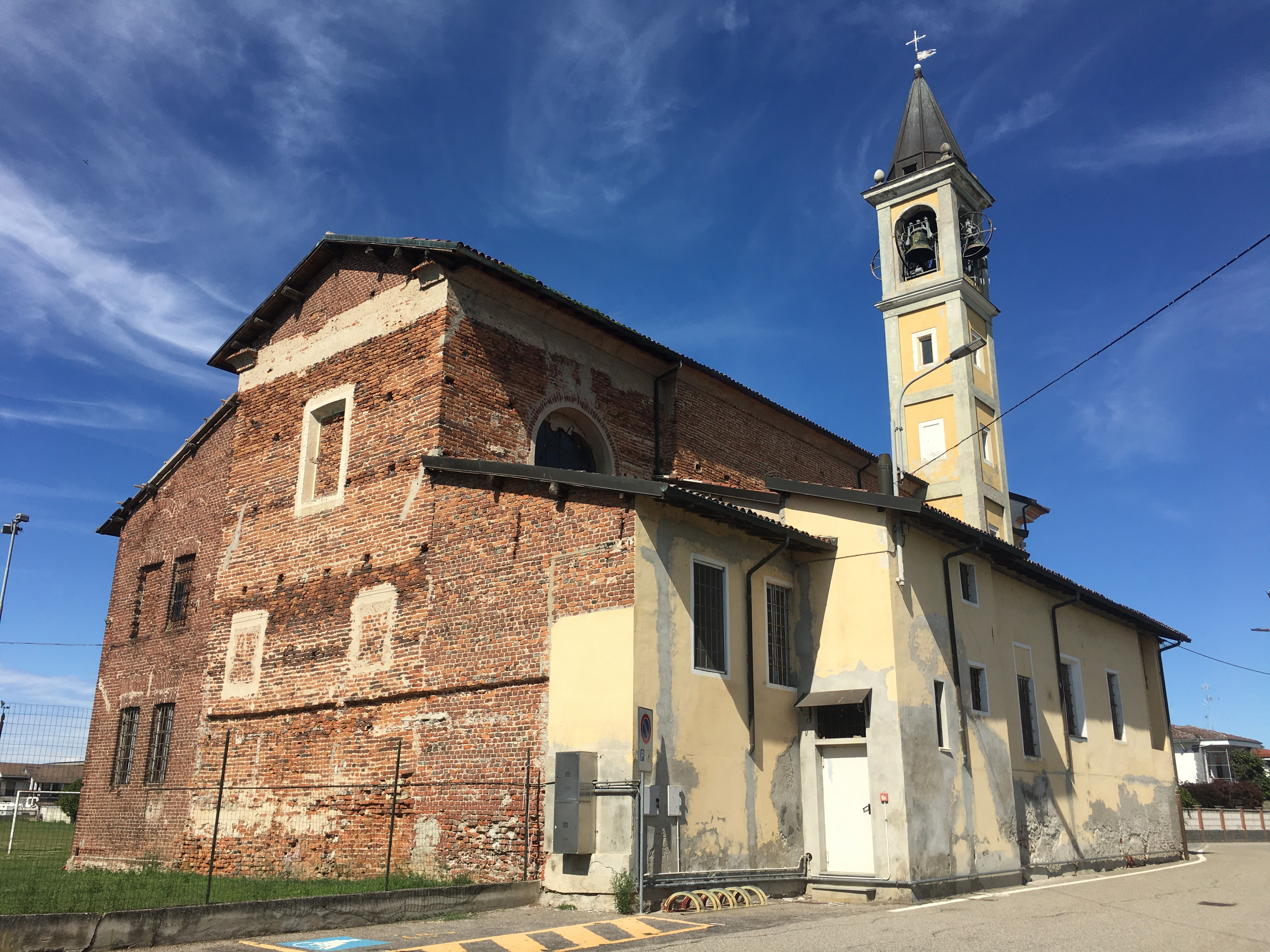
Rear view from the southwest, the sacristy on the right

The facade of the church is salient and divided into three parts by pilasters. In the centre is a small porch, supported by two columns, which protects the entrance portal, which in turn is surmounted by the rose window. On the sides are two windows.

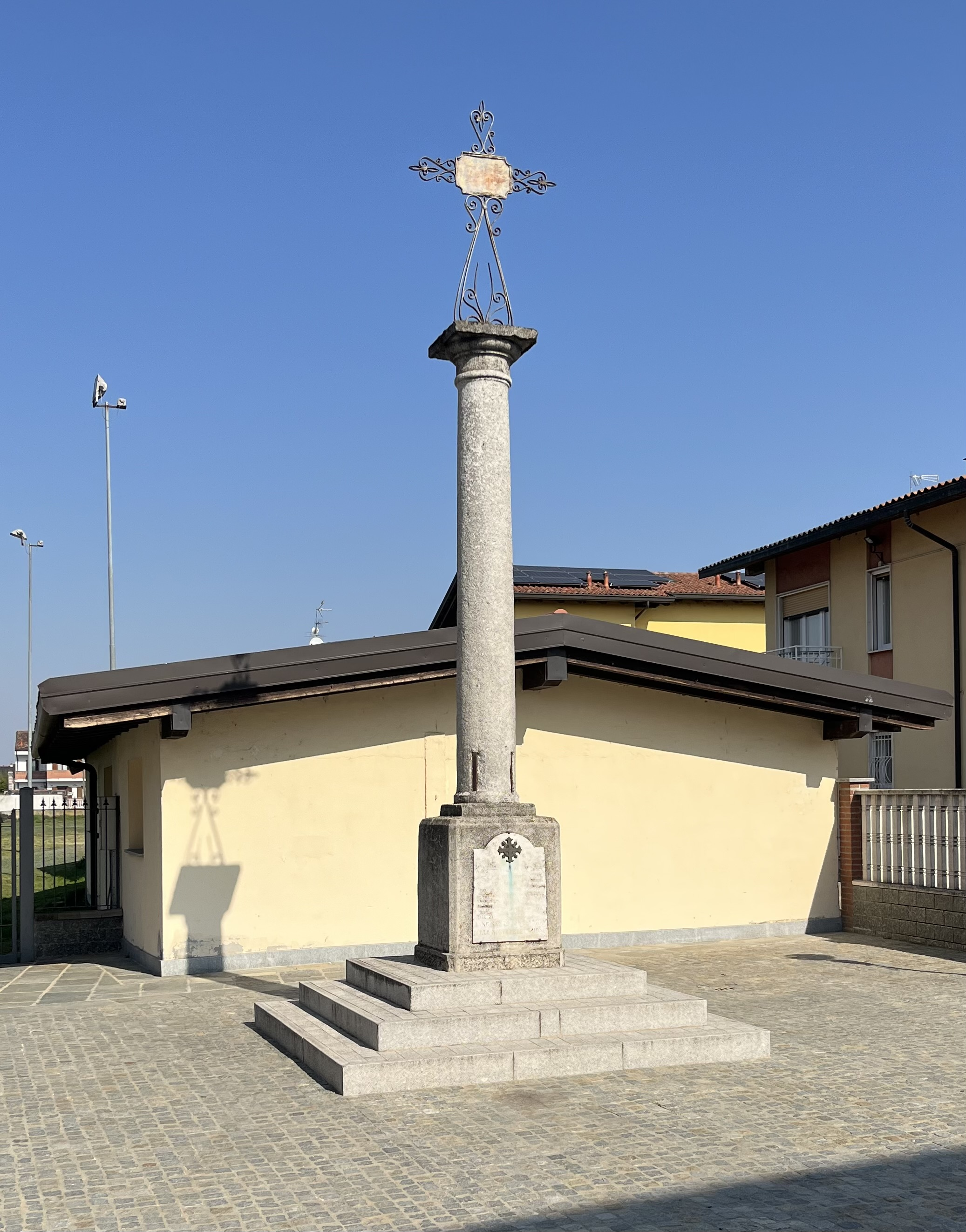
Granite column in the churchyard

In the small square in front, on the left, there is a granite column with the inscription (translation): To replace the wooden cross that had been placed here in memory of the Holy Missions of 27 Dec. - 6 Jan. 1902-1903, this monument was erected also as a perpetual reminder of the Holy Missions preached from 27 Dec. to 7 Jan. 1933-1934, the Holy Year of the Redemption of the Human Race.

=== Interior ===
The interior is divided into three naves divided by pillars above which are placed arches.

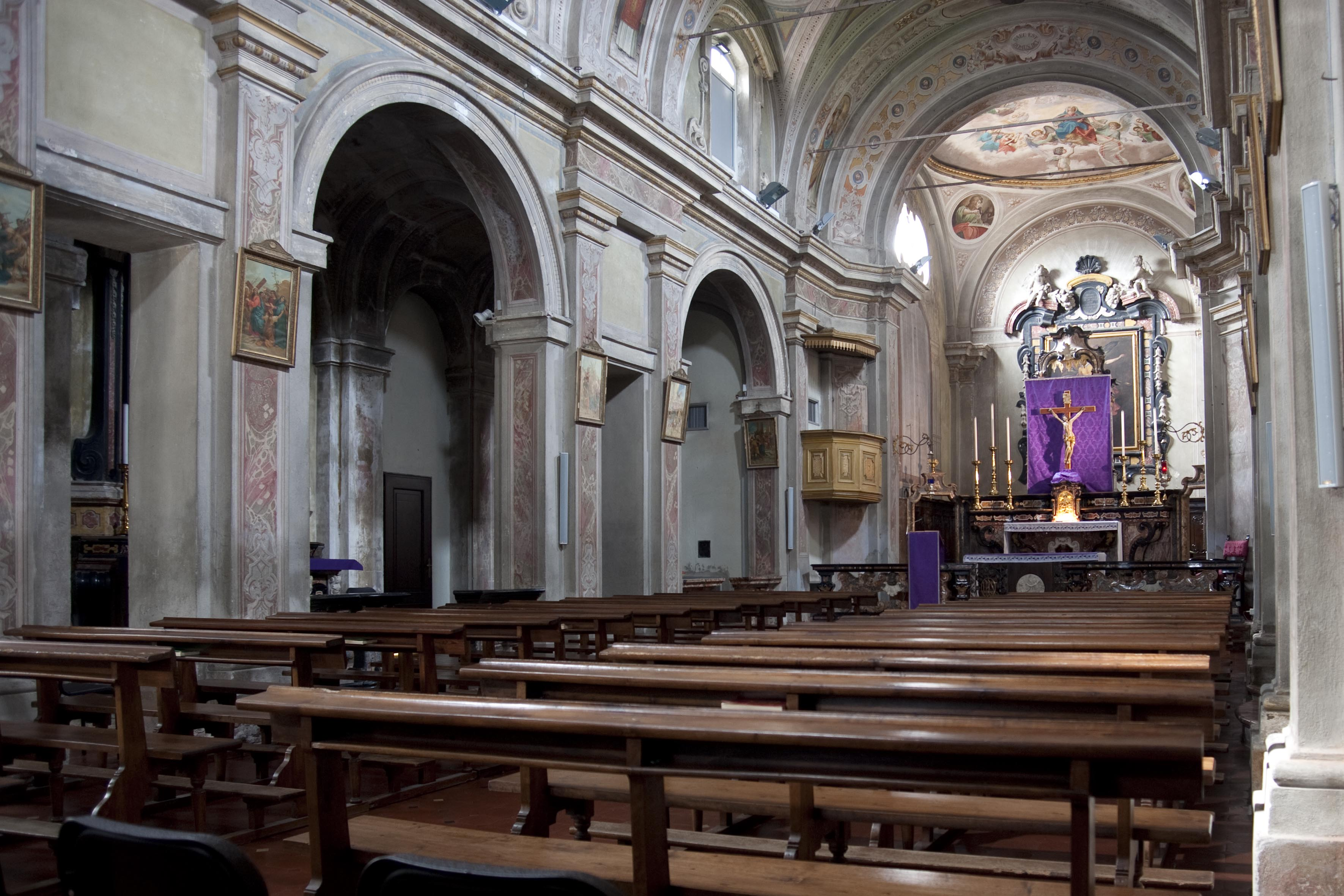
Central nave

Entering the church, in the right nave you find the baptistery, followed by the chapel dedicated to Our Lady of Lourdes. The chapel, commissioned by Mayor Carlo Geri in 1914 in memory of his wife Clara Gavinelli, is an artistic reproduction of the original grotto, with the addition of a depiction of Clara Gavinelli herself on the left wall, painted by the painter Rodolfo Gambini (images in the section Chapel of Our Lady of Lourdes). The chapel was restored in 1996 by Luigi Casalchini and Giuseppe Facchetti. Next come the marble altars of St. Anthony of Padua and the crucified Christ.

In the left aisle, near the door, is a large black marble plaque inscribed with the names of the church's benefactors and their dates of death. Next are the marble altars dedicated to Our Lady of the Rosary and Our Lady of Sorrows.

The altar is made of polychrome marble and surmounted by a small columned throne containing the statue of the Sacred Heart. As recalled by the inscription behind the altar, it was donated to the church by the mayor Carlo Geri in 1924. The choir is covered with walnut panels surmounted by a painted altarpiece depicting Saint Michael conquering evil, in eighteenth-century Lombard style and restored in 1992. In turn, the altarpiece is enclosed in a red and black marble frame, surmounted by two white marble angels and in the centre a medallion bearing the inscription Sancte Michael Arcangele hic et ubique veni in audiutorium populo Dei.

== The bells ==
=== 17th century ===
An inventory of 1618 reported that the bell tower was equipped with two bells, decorated with images and inscriptions: one of 15 rubbi, decorated with a representation of Christ on the cross, Madonna with the child in her arms, a saint in bishop's robes, Saint Michael with the inscription Princeps gloriosissime Michael Arcangele esto memor nostri hic et ubique; one of 17 rubbi equipped with various images and inscriptions, of which only Sancta Maria sucurre miseris, ora pro populo, intercede pro clero, die XII maji 1597 was reported, whose last words indicated the date of creation. Corresponding one rubbio to a little more than 8 kilograms, the two bells weighed approximately 121 and 137 kilograms respectively.

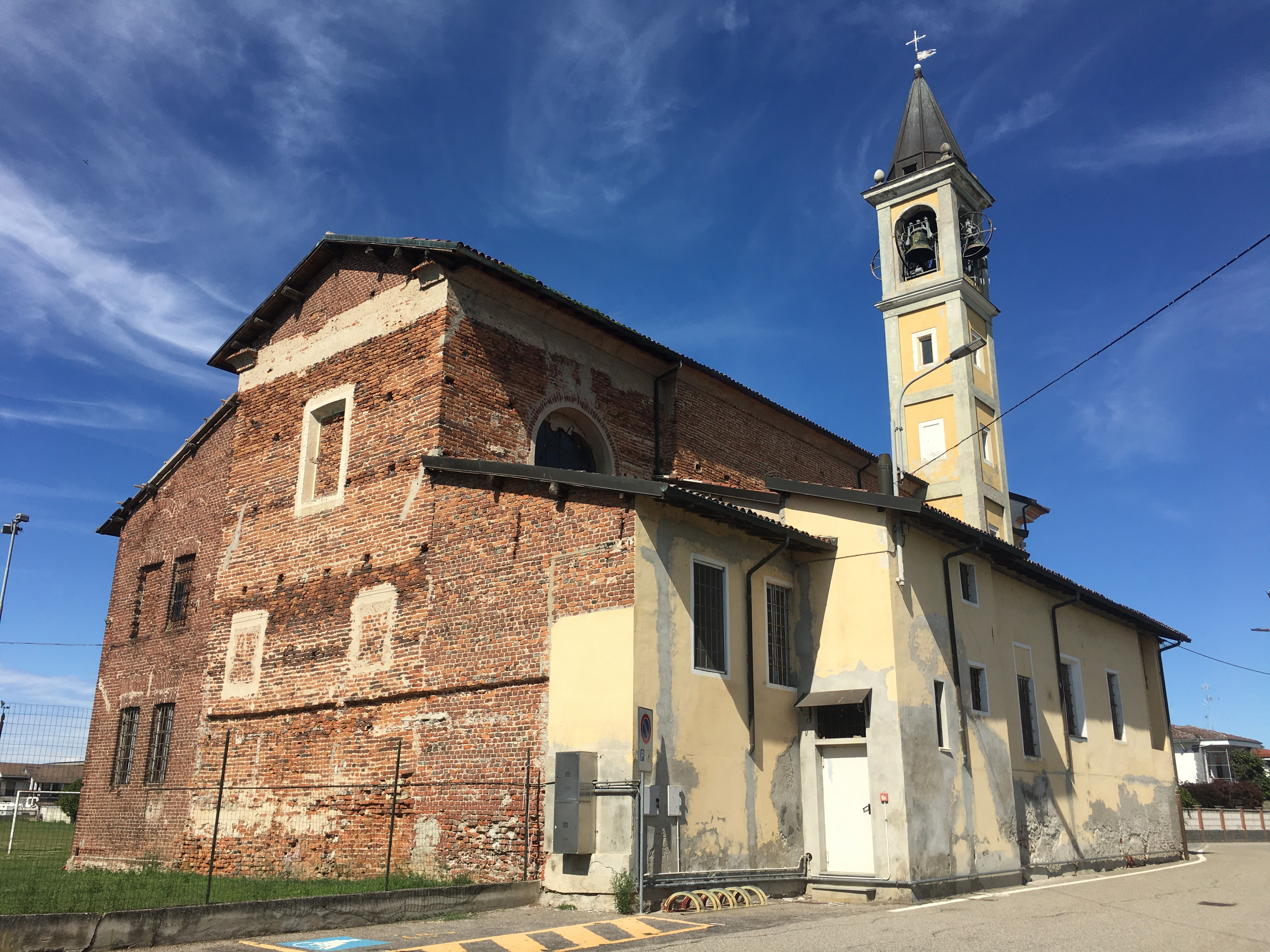
The belfry

=== 18th century ===
In 1792, parish priest Giuseppe Tosi reported that the same two bells were in the bell tower, which had not been blessed and were maintained by the community itself. Four years later, two centuries after their creation, the larger bell broke, causing the residents of the farmhouses to miss Sunday Mass, unable to hear the call of the smaller bell. The following year, the city council therefore resolved to entrust the recast of the larger bell to Antonio Prinetti of Vercelli, who would create a bronze of the same weight.

=== 19th century ===
Once the bell tower was erected in 1832, it was decided to replace the bells, as they were not perfectly in tune. The work was commissioned to Pasquale Mazzola from Valduggia, who delivered the work that same year. A few months later, however, the swinging of the bell tower caused the new bells to break, and they had to be recast. At the end of the 19th century, a third, smaller bell was added, weighing a total of 600 kilograms.

=== 20th century ===
In March 1936, the bells were renewed, and they were entrusted to the Mazzola foundry in Valduggia, now managed by Roberto, son of the late Pasquale. By adding more raw material, five new bells were forged, weighing a total of almost 24 quintals. Given the small belfry and the considerable weight of the bronzes, the foundations of the bell tower were reinforced again. On Palm Sunday, April 5, 1936, the bells were consecrated by the bishop of Novara Giuseppe Castelli himself, during a solemn ceremony orchestrated by the parish priest Carlo De Gasperis and attended by the authorities, the people, and all the parish priests of the vicariate. The new bells, in E, F, and G, were decorated with numerous images and inscriptions, both in Italian and Latin, reporting the names of the saints, the donors, and dedications to the deceased.

During World War II, numerous metal artifacts were requisitioned by the authorities to support the manufacture of armaments. In 1942, the weight of each bell in Garbagna was reported, and in February 1943, the collection of 60% of the bronze from each bell tower in the Novara area began, an activity for which the same Mazzola company from Valduggia was commissioned. To general dismay, the two largest bells (E and F) were lowered from the bell tower and sent to Novara, from where they were shipped to Germany. Reports were received that they had been broken and melted down in Hamburg.

In 1950, the two largest bells were recast by the Achille Mazzola firm of Valduggia, resulting in the current five bells concert in E3, according to the Ambrosian system. Don Angelo from Cellio (Vercelli), originally from Garbagna and rector of the Sacro Monte di Varallo, shared a curious anecdote on the subject: the peculiarity of the new installation lay in the small, lightweight iron blocks, specially created by the Mazzola firm at the express request of the Garbagnese, to allow the placement in the small cell of bells larger and more powerful than those of the nearby Nibbiola bell tower (in F3), for reasons of pure parochial pride.

== The clergy house ==
=== The first house ===
The first clergy house of which we have news dates back to the years in which the Lordship of Milan was increasing its influence on the Municipality of Novara. Specifically, it was described by the curate Uberto Fregonara from Trecate in the Consignationes of 1347, in the list of the church's benefice. It was a sedimen (small house) located immediately north of the church (see map at section 16th-18th century), whose land was bordered to the north and east by the castle's moat. We know the building was composed of a hall, kitchen, two rooms with attic and a farmhouse. To get an idea of its location, just think that where today (2024) the sports field is, there was at that time the clergy house, while near the current cemetery there were the vegetable garden, the vineyard and a well.

At the time of Spanish rule over the Novarese area, in 1618 the building still existed, although in poor condition. It is always documented with a field and vineyard to the west of the church, together with the garden to the south of the same. A small door on the north side of the choir connected the church to the courtyard of the clergy house, an access which is known at least until the beginning of the 20th century.

Given the terrible state it was in, in 1691 the curate Cristoforo Caccia began its restoration, with the financial support of the population. The work continued in 1705 with the initiative of the curate Gaetano Buffalora, who had it rebuilt in 1711.

Abandoned in 1748 and uninhabited, it was left to collapse towards the end of the nineteenth century. In 1948, the well behind the choir, some sections of walls and parts of the foundations could still be seen.

=== The second house ===
In 1748 the curate Pietro Plantanida exchanged the clergy house and the adjoining lands with Count Caroelli for a farmhouse in the centre of village. However, despite having a large courtyard and the advantage of being constantly sunny (it faced south), the distance from the church and the age of the building made it objectively uncomfortable. After a century the building became uninhabitable, forcing the curate Giovanni De Paoli to abandon it and ask for hospitality first in the palace of Count Caroelli then to the priest/lawyer Antonio Pagella.

In 1978 the building was used as a warehouse.

=== The third house ===
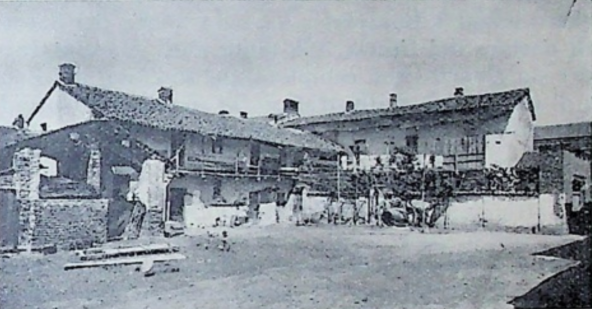
The third clergy house in the first half of the 20th century

Between the First and Second War of Independence, in 1853, the curate Giuseppe De Giuli erected a new clergy house, with his own contributions and those of the population. The building was constructed with recycled materials, connected to the east side of the old one and overlooking the main road. The previous rectory was restored and assigned to the tenant of the parish benefice.

In 1948 Ernesto Colli described the building as being in good static conditions, but with so much humidity that the ground floor was inhospitable. In 1978 he reported it as inhabited by the settlers of the parish benefit Gian Piero and Antonio Monzaschi, of Brescian origin.

=== The fourth house ===
The current clergy house was built in the third quarter of the twentieth century, on the land of Count Caroelli's giardinone (big garden), purchased by the curate Luigi Stasioli. The building, erected near the church and financed by the religious man himself, was designed by the surveyor Giov. Omodei Zorini and built by the Cesarino Manzini construction company from Nibbiola.

== Image gallery ==
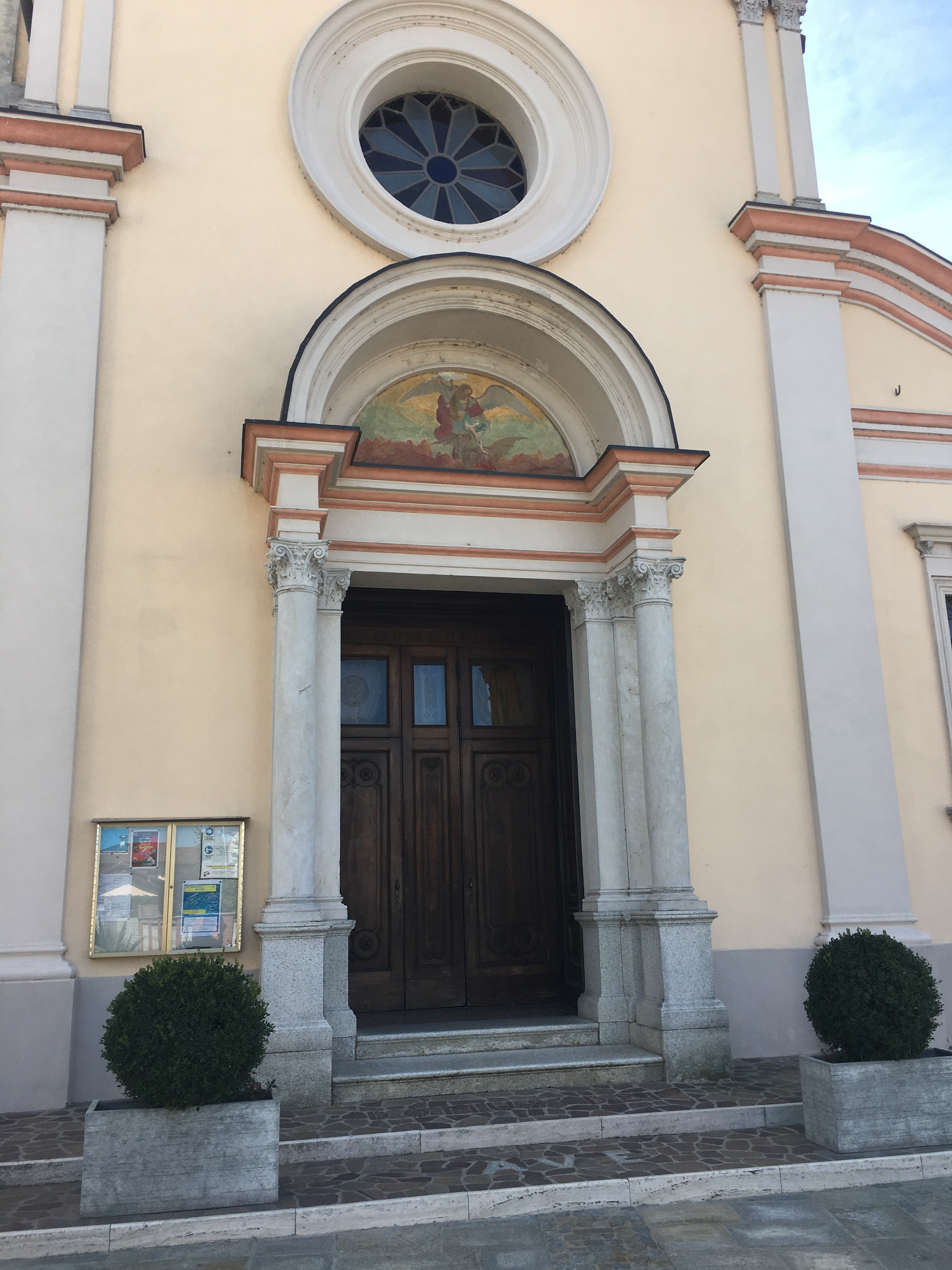
Portal, surmounted by the fresco of Saint Michael

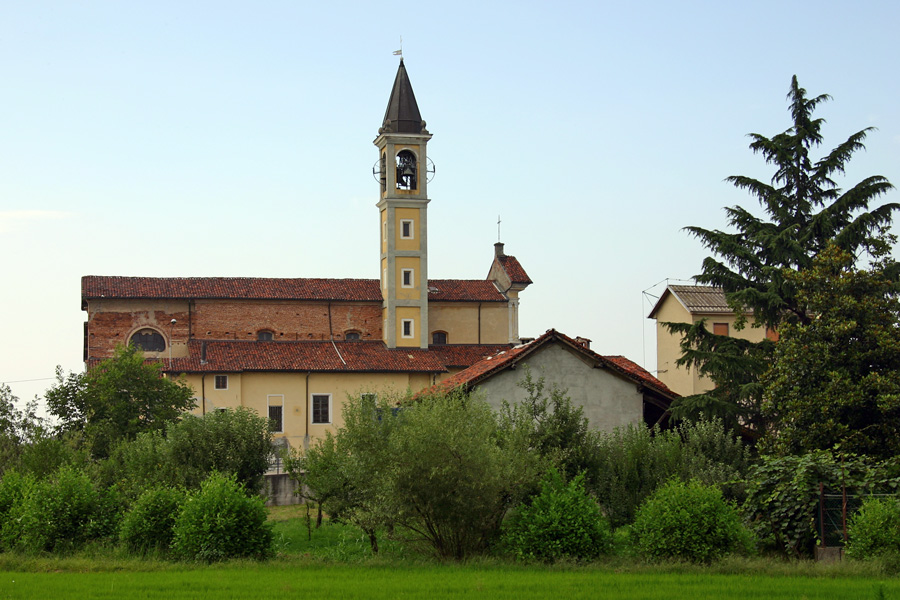
The church seen from the south

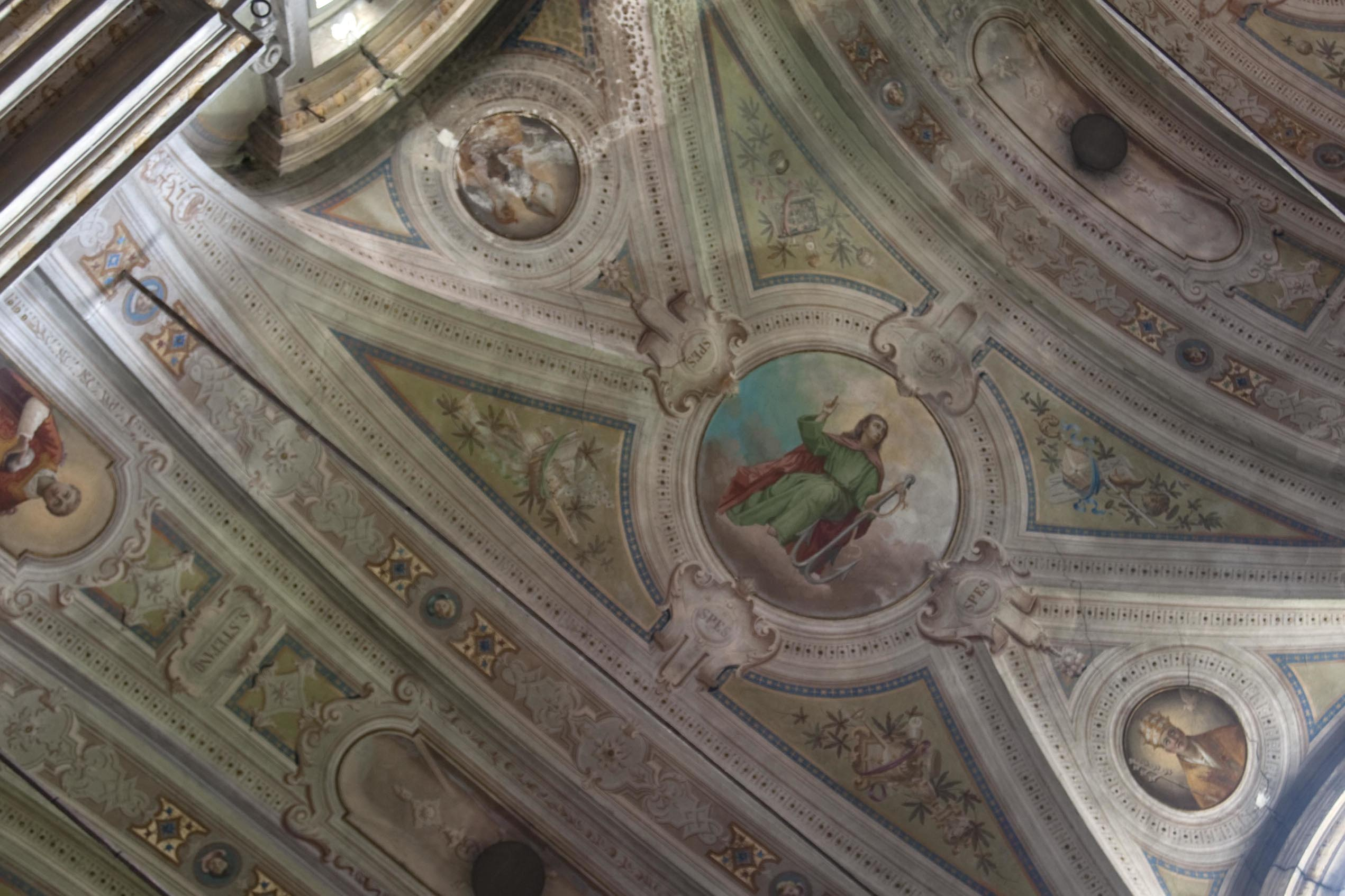
Vault of the central nave

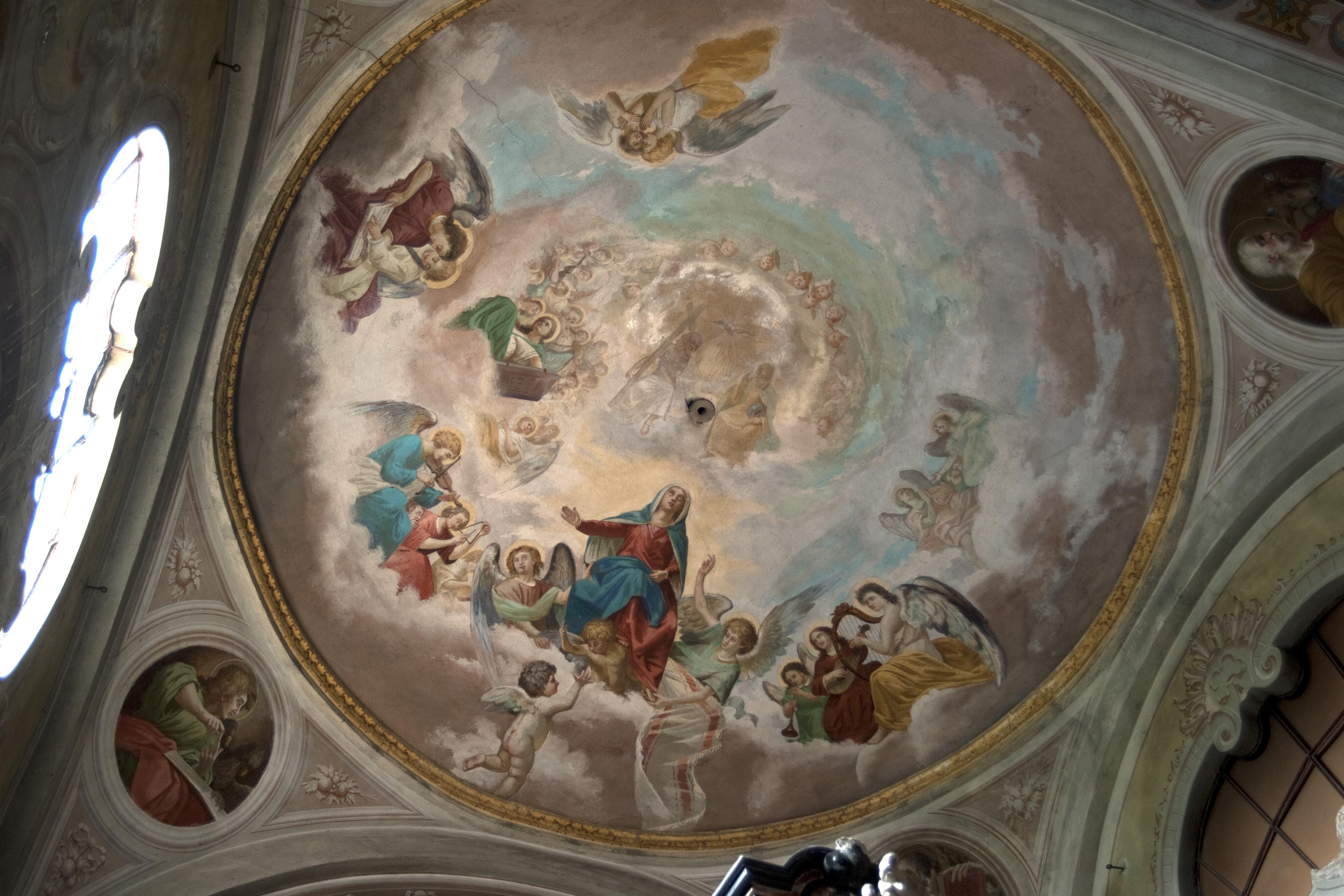
Fresco on the presbytery ceiling depicting the Assumption of Mary

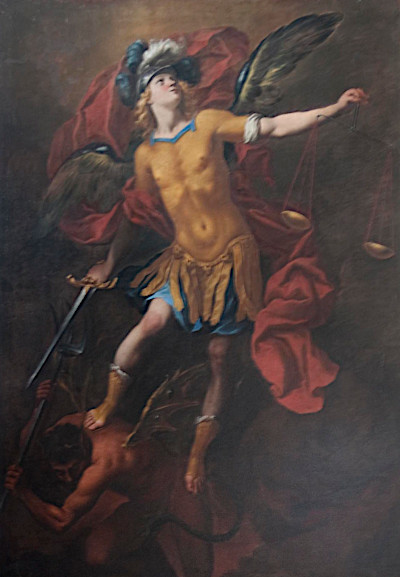
Altarpiece depicting Saint Michael

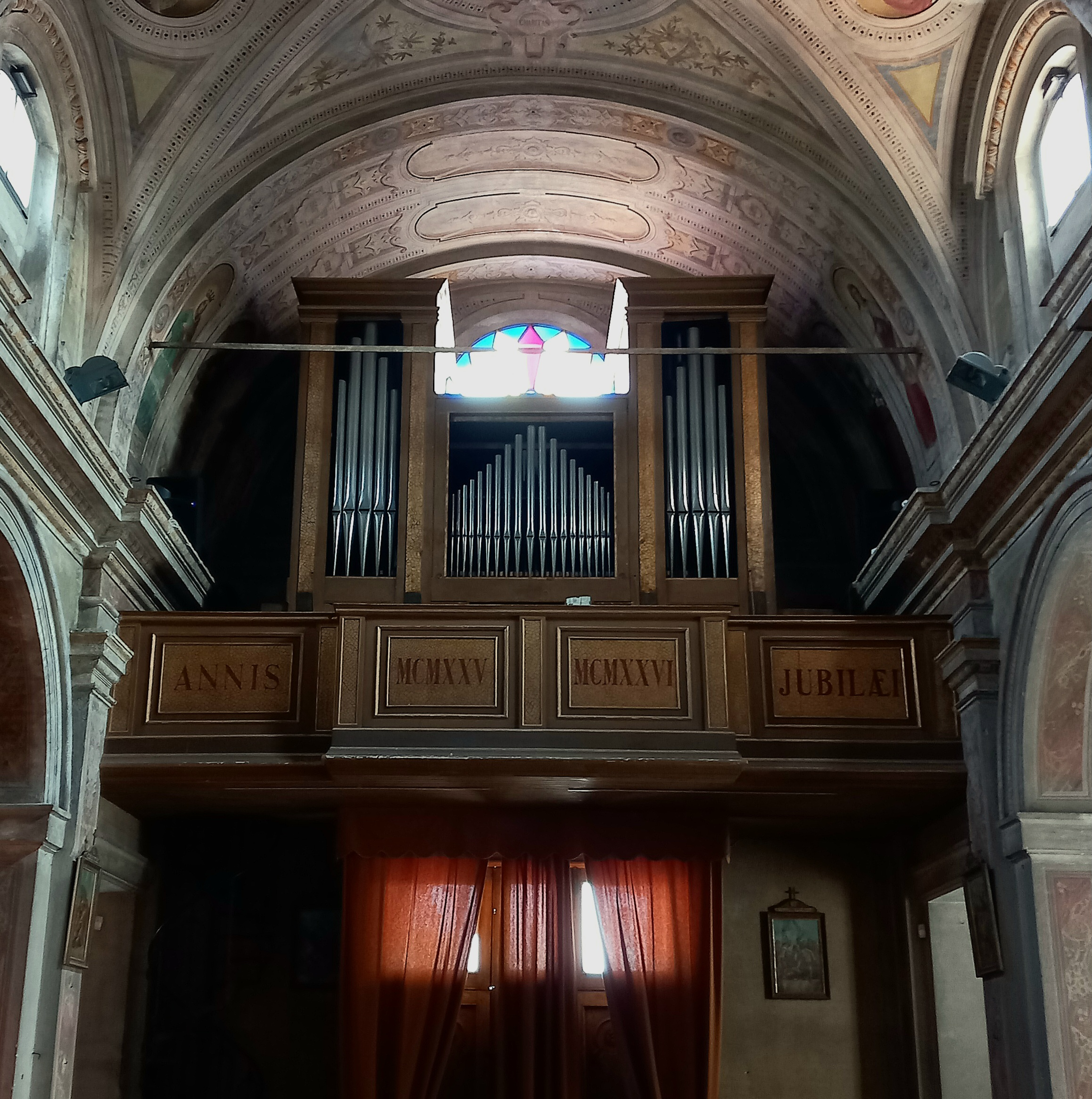
Organ, above the entrance door

=== Chapel of Our Lady of Lourdes ===
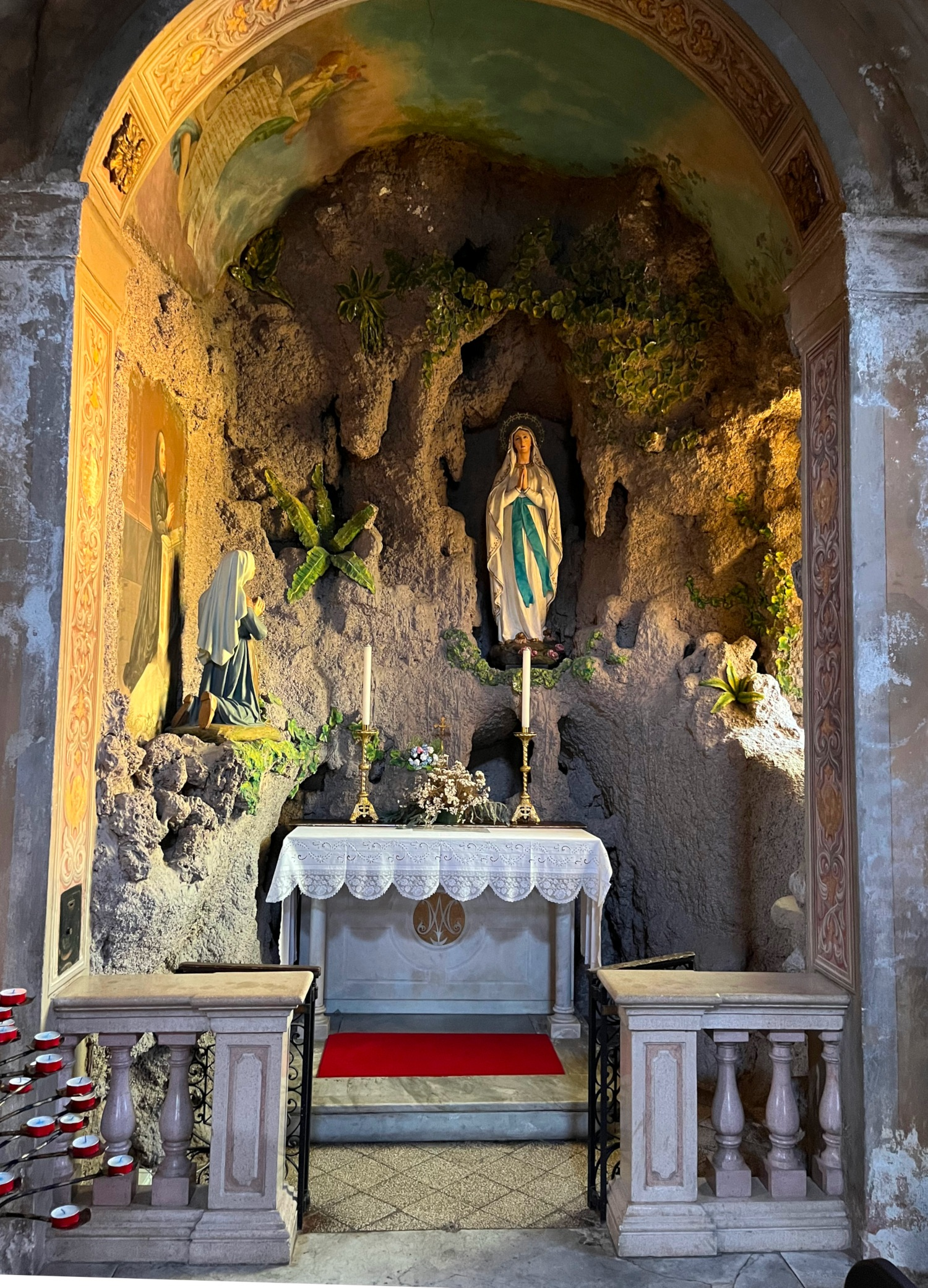
Front view

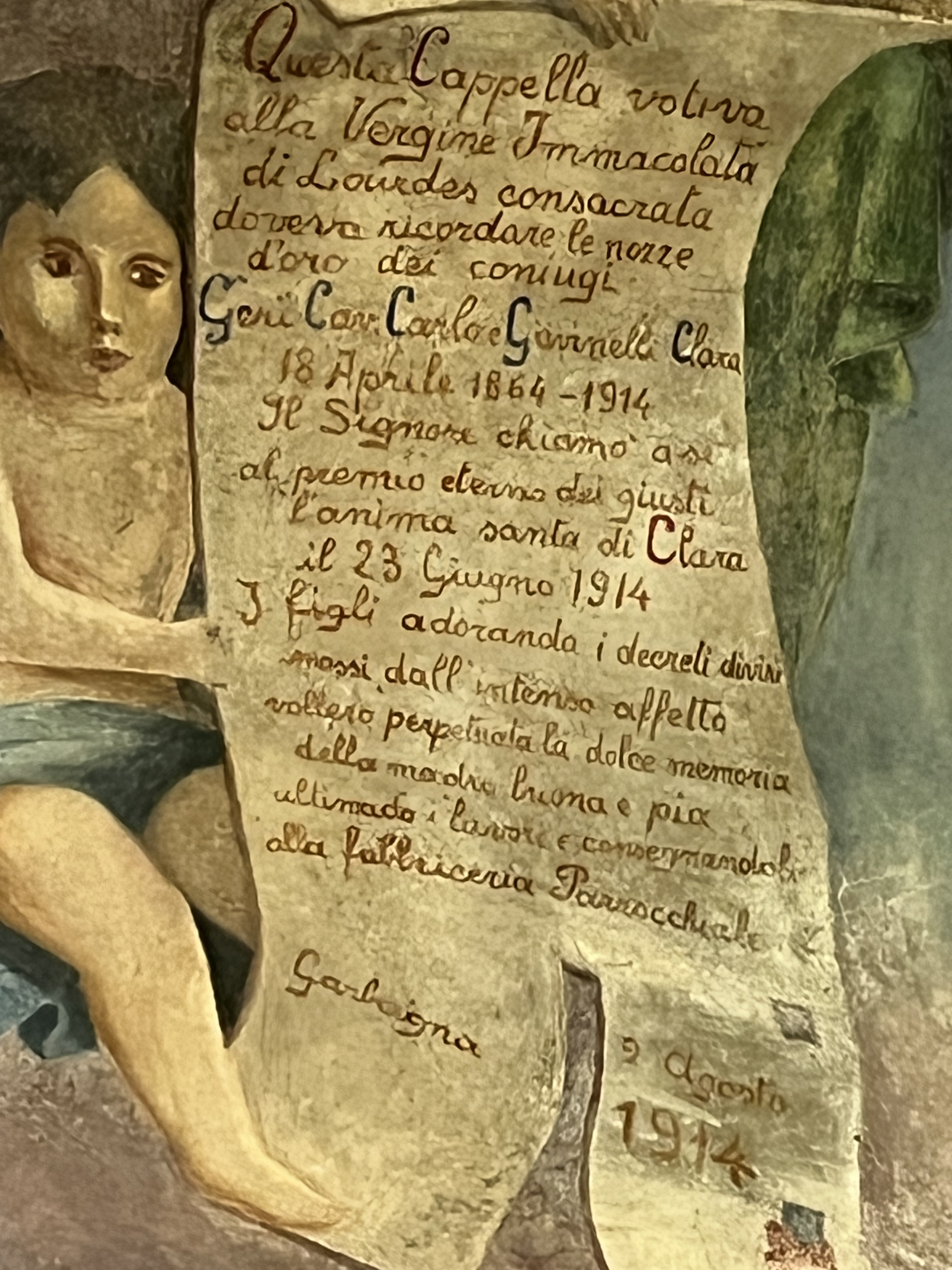
Cartouche with dedication

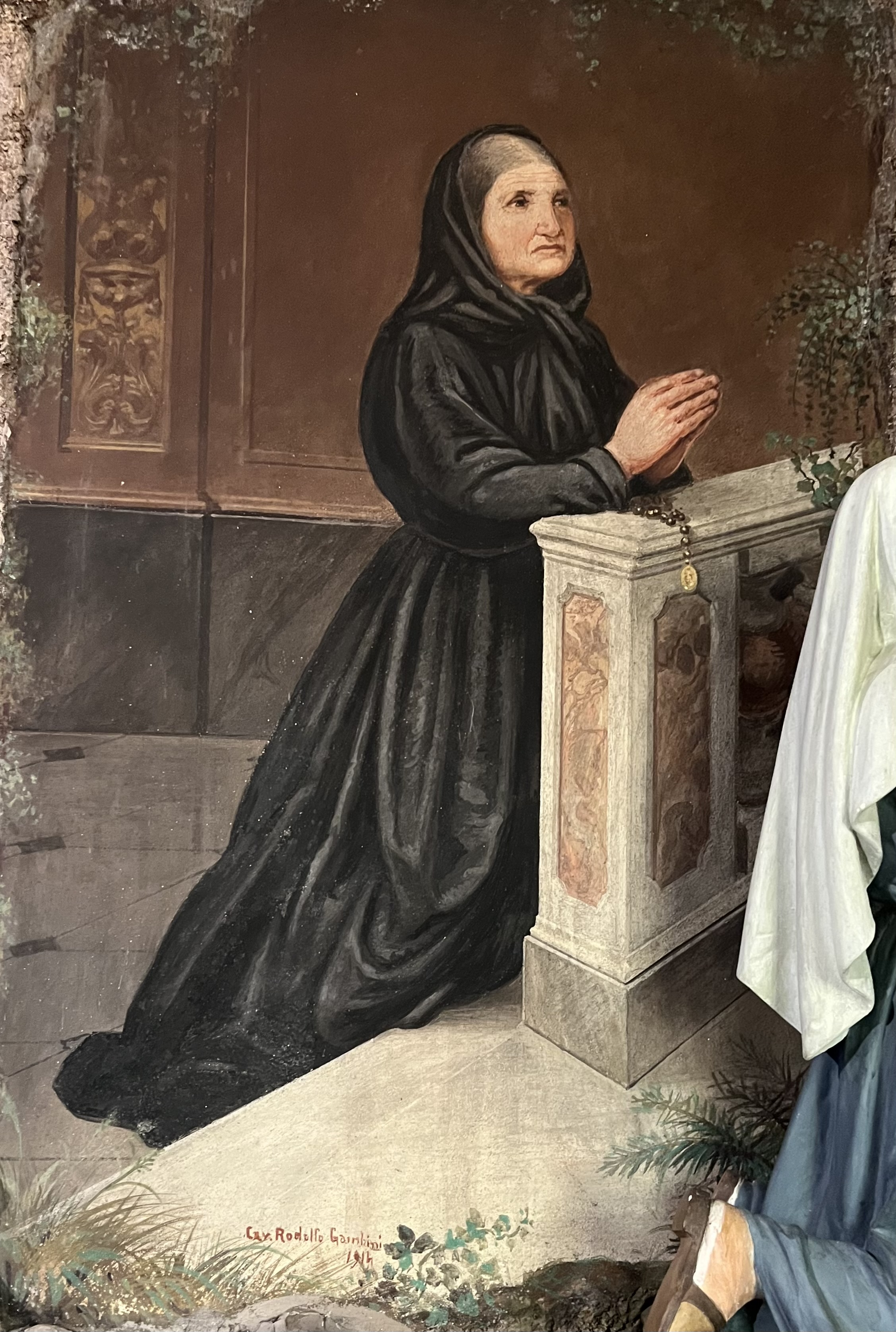
Portrait of Clara Gavinelli

== Bibliography ==
- Cassani, Lino; Colli, Ernesto (1948). Memorie storiche di Garbagna Novarese [Historical memories of Garbagna Novarese] (in Italian). Novara: Tip. Pietro Riva & C – via Foto Emilio Alzati.
- Colli, Ernesto (1978). Garbagna, Nibbiola, Vespolate, Borgolavezzaro - Le mie memorie [Garbagna, Nibbiola, Vespolate, Borgolavezzaro - My memories] (in Italian). Novara: Tip. San Gaudenzio – via Foto Emilio Alzati.
- Franzosi, Franca (1986). Un episodio della cultura figurativa novarese: Santa Maria di Garbagna e i suoi affreschi quattrocenteschi [An episode of Novara figurative culture: Santa Maria of Garbagna and its fifteenth‑century frescoes] (Thesis) (in Italian). Maria Luisa Gatti Perer and Franco Mazzini (supervisors). Milan: Università Cattolica del Sacro Cuore di Milano – via Comune di Garbagna Novarese.
- Giani, Silvia (2021). La storia di Novara - Dalla preistoria ai giorni nostri [History of Novara - From prehistory to the present day]. CommunityBook - La Storia d'Italia (in Italian). Vol. Nº3/2021. Roma: Typimedia. ISBN 978-88-3626-029-4. ISSN 2704-9744 – via IDocPub.

== See also ==
- Oratorio di Santa Maria (Garbagna Novarese)
- History of Garbagna Novarese
