= Saint Bobo =

Frankish warrior, saint and pilgrim

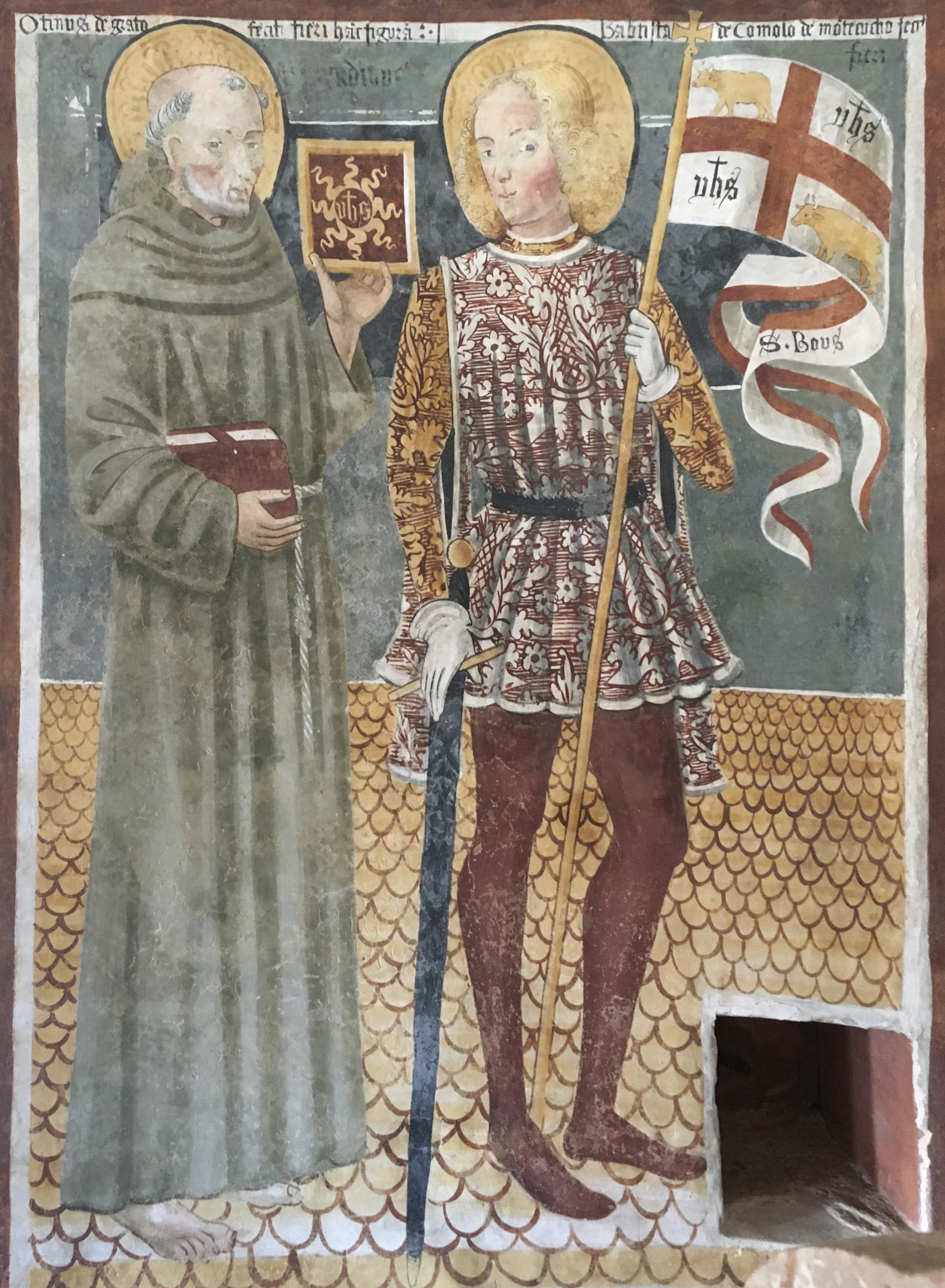
Fresco in Oratorio di Santa Maria, Garbagna Novarese, Italy (15th century)

Saint Bobo of Provence (French: Beuvon or Bobon, Italian: Bovo or Bobone; died 986) was a Frankish warrior and pilgrim from Noyers (Noghiers). He is known only from the anonymous biography Vita sancti Bobonis. He built a castle on a hill opposite the Muslim fortress of Fraxinet and led the Christians of Provence to victory in battle with the Muslims in an unknown year. During the battle he had a mystical experience and vowed, if victorious, to renounce war and become a pilgrim devoted to the care of orphans and widows. After the loss of his brother, he went on pilgrimage to Rome and died at Voghera in Lombardy. Bobo is venerated as a saint in the Eastern Orthodox and Roman Catholic churches. His feast day is May 22 and he is the patron saint of cattle.

== Sources ==
- Ballan, Mohamad (2010). "Fraxinetum: An Islamic Frontier State in Tenth Century Provence". Comitatus: A Journal of Medieval and Renaissance Studies. 41: 23–76.
- France, John (2005). Crusades and the Expansion of Catholic Christendom, 1000–1714. Florence, KY: Routledge.
- Murray, Alexander (2002). Reason and Society in the Middle Ages. Oxford: Clarendon Press.
- Poupardin, René. Le royaume de Provence sous les Carolingiens (855–933). Paris: E. Bouillon.
- Versteegh, K. (1990). "The Arab presence in France and Switzerland in the 10th Century". Arabica. 37: 359–88. doi:10.1163/157005890x00041.
