= Giacomo Perolini =

Italian physician, photographer and art historian

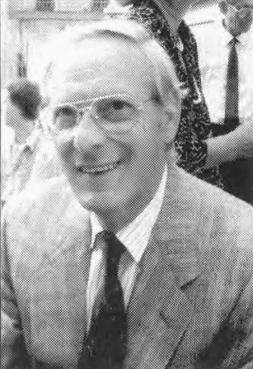
- Born: Maggiora
- Died: 17 July 2005 (aged 78); Novara
- Citizenship: Italian
- Occupations: Physician, photographer, art historian
- Known for: works on the history and art history of Novarese

Giacomo Perolini (died 17 July 2005) was an Italian physician, photographer and art historian, known for his works on Novarese.

Active for over thirty years as a medical doctor in the Lower Novara area, he distinguished himself for his passion for art history and photography, particularly Romanesque art. He collaborated with museums and scholars, leaving a photographic archive of more than 30,000 images and contributing to publications and exhibitions of both local and national significance.

== Biography ==
Giacomo Perolini was born in Maggiora in the late 1920s.

He graduated in medicine from the University of Turin and entered the ranking list of general practitioners of the Province of Novara in the late 1950s. From 1 October 1962 to 31 December 1993 he served as general practitioner for the community of Garbagna Novarese and subsequently also of Nibbiola, and also was district medical officer of the Lower Novara area until the healthcare reform of the 1980s.

For several years he worked at the Major Hospital of Novara in the Second Department of Internal Medicine and published studies on liver disease and serum glycoproteins.

Alongside his medical profession, Perolini developed an intense activity of research and photographic documentation on art and Romanesque architecture of the Province of Novara and Piedmont. He was a member of the Centro Novarese di Ricerca e Documentazione Fotografica, cited as an expert in medieval art, took part in exhibitions and conferences on medieval art and architecture, and provided photographic documentation for restorations and local studies, collaborating with the Charles Péguy Cultural Centre, the Museums Office of Novara and scholars such as Giancarlo Andenna.

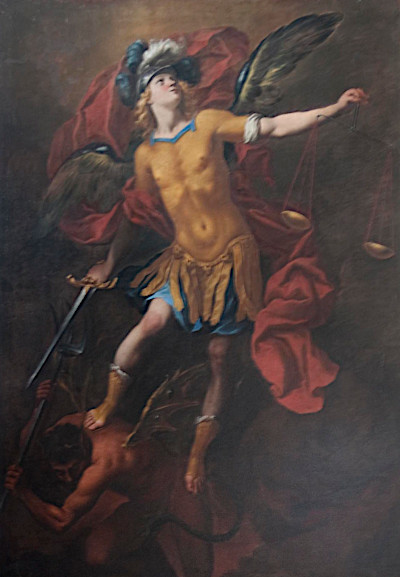
Eighteenth-century painting in the church of San Michele Arcangelo in Garbagna Novarese, whose restoration was promoted by Perolini and his wife Emma Clavenna

Together with his wife Emma Clavenna, he contributed to the enhancement of the local cultural heritage, promoting restorations such as that of the eighteenth-century painting of Saint Michael Archangel in Garbagna in 1992, and contributing to the establishment of the Cathedral Museum of Novara.

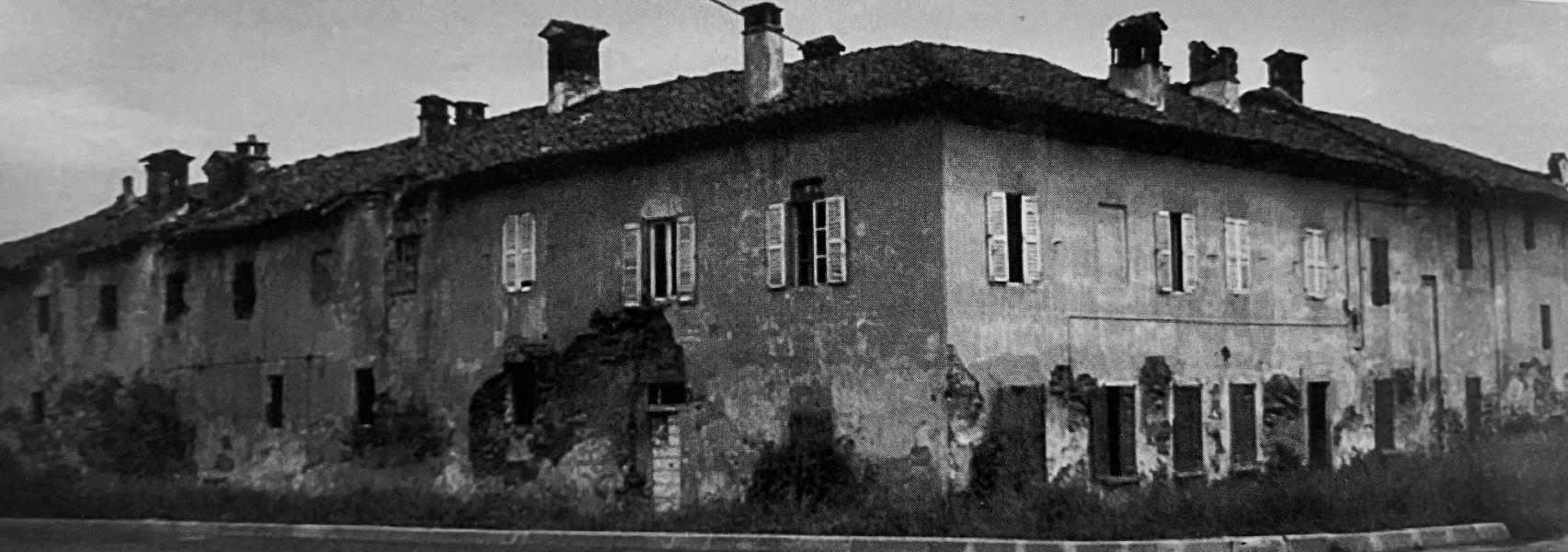
The historic Borghetto farmstead in Garbagna Novarese, photographed by Perolini

His photographic archive, comprising more than 30,000 images of architecture and Romanesque sculpture, was donated to research institutions such as the Corpus dell'Arte Senese.

Giacomo Perolini died in Novara on 17 July 2005, at the age of 77 or 78, and was buried in his native Maggiora.

== Works and publications ==
=== Medicine ===
Giacomo Perolini collaborated on several scientific studies in the field of internal medicine, particularly on liver disease and alterations of lipid metabolism, often in collaboration with other physicians of the Major Hospital of Novara. Among his main publications:

- C. Franzini; G. Perolini (1957). "Trattamento delle epatopatie acute e croniche con ormoni ipofiso-surrenalici" [Treatment of acute and chronic liver diseases with pituitary–adrenal hormones]. L'Ospedale Maggiore di Novara (in Italian). 2 (34). Novara: 122-….
- C. Franzini; H. Campanini; G. Perolini (1957). "Su alcune alterazioni del ricambio lipidico studiato per mezzo del carico di grassi" [On certain alterations of lipid metabolism studied by means of fat loading]. Minerva medica (in Italian) (48). Torino: 3260–3265.
- C. Franzini; G. Perolini (1958). "La terapia delle epatopatie con i cortisonici" [The treatment of liver diseases with corticosteroids]. Fegato (in Italian). 4 (1): 52–114.
- C. Franzini; H. Campanini; G. Perolini (1958). "Le glicoproteine sieriche; criteri metodologici di ricerca" [Serum glycoproteins: methodological criteria for research]. Progresso medico (in Italian) (14). Naples: 531–536.
- C. Franzini; G. Perolini; L. Zambotto (1960). "Il quadro siero-lipoproteico nelle epatopatie acute e croniche" [The serum lipoprotein profile in acute and chronic liver diseases]. Minerva medica (in Italian) (51). Turin: 508–517.
- G. Perolini; H. Campanini (1960). Ospedale Maggiore di Novara (ed.). "Le caratteristiche umorali dell'aterosclerosi studiate in funzione della gravità e dell'età con metodo statistico" [The humoral characteristics of atherosclerosis studied in relation to severity and age using statistical methods]. Minerva medica (in Italian) (6). Torino: 315–351.
- H. Campanini; G. Perolini (1961). "Le glicoproteine seriche in alcune emopatie (leucosi chroniche, leucosi acute, linfogranulomi maligni, plasmocitomi)" [Serum glycoproteins in certain blood disorders (chronic leukemias, acute leukemias, malignant lymphogranulomas, plasmacytomas)]. Minerva medica (in Italian) (52). Turin: 1530–1535.
- G. Comoli; G. Perolini; L. Castano (1962). "Su di un caso di plasmocitoma in alfa_{2}-globuline" [On a case of plasmacytoma in the alpha_{2}-globulin fraction]. Minerva medica (in Italian) (53). Torino: 1788–1791.
- H. Campanini; G. Perolini (1963). Ospedale Maggiore di Novara (ed.). "Le glicoproteine seriche nelle affezioni del sistema epatobiliare" [Serum glycoproteins in diseases of the hepatobiliary system]. Archivio per le scienze mediche (in Italian) (116). Turin: 34–53.
- G. Perolini; L. Castano; F. Anchisi (1966). "Contributo allo studio del protidogramma elettroforetico nelle leucemie acute e nelle leucemie mieloidi e linfatiche croniche" [Contribution to the study of the electrophoretic protein profile in acute leukemias and chronic myeloid and lymphatic leukemias]. Minerva medica (in Italian) (57). Torino: 1942–1946.

=== Art and history ===
Alongside his medical career, Perolini devoted himself to historical research and artistic photography, documenting in particular the Romanesque heritage of the Novara area and the Lower Novara district. His work includes both scholarly books and catalogues, as well as contributions to exhibitions and museum projects:

- Maria Laura Tomea Gavazzoli, ed. (1980). Novara e la sua terra nei secoli XI e XII. Storia, documenti, architettura [Novara and its territory in the 11th and 12th centuries. History, documents, architecture] (in Italian). Milan: Silvana Editoriale (from the exhibition of the same name, held at the Broletto from 15 May to 15 June 1980).
- Maria Laura Tomea Gavazzoli, ed. (1987). Museo novarese. Documenti studi e progetti per una nuova immagine delle collezioni civiche [The Novara Museum. Documents, studies and projects for a new image of the civic collections] (in Italian). Novara: Comune di Novara, Istituto Geografico De Agostini.
- Maria Laura Tomea Gavazzoli (1988). Rotary Club di Novara (ed.). L'Oratorio di San Siro in Novara. Arte, storia, agiografia tra XII e XIV secolo [The Oratory of San Siro in Novara. Art, history and hagiography between the 12th and 14th centuries] (in Italian). Novara: Istituto geografico De Agostini.
- AA.VV. (1993). Province of Novara (ed.). Il Basso Novarese: Borgolavezzaro, Garbagna, Nibbiola, Terdobbiate, Tornaco e Vespolate [The Lower Novara area: Borgolavezzaro, Garbagna, Nibbiola, Terdobbiate, Tornaco and Vespolate]. Percorsi, storia e documenti artistici del Novarese (in Italian). Casale Corte Cerro: Press Grafica.
- La pianura novarese dal Romanico al XV secolo. Percorsi di arte e architettura religiosa [The Novara plain from the Romanesque to the 15th century. Paths of religious art and architecture] (in Italian). Novara: Interlinea. 1996.
- Giancarlo Andenna; Franca Franzoni; Enrico Roveda; Aldo A. Settia (1999). Insediamenti medievali fra Sesia e Ticino. Problemi istituzionali e sociali (secoli XII-XV) [Medieval settlements between the Sesia and Ticino. Institutional and social issues (12th–15th centuries)] (in Italian). Novara: Interlinea.
- Fabio Bisogni; Chiara Calciolari, eds. (2006). Affreschi novaresi del Trecento e del Quattrocento. Arte, devozione, società [Novara frescoes of the 14th and 15th centuries. Art, devotion, society] (in Italian). Cinisello Balsamo: Silvana Editoriale.

== Honors ==
Cavaliere dell'Ordine della Repubblica – ribbon for ordinary uniform

Knight of the Order of Merit of the Italian Republic
"By decree of the Minister of the Interior"
— 2 June 1986
