= Franca Franzosi =

Italian educator and art historian

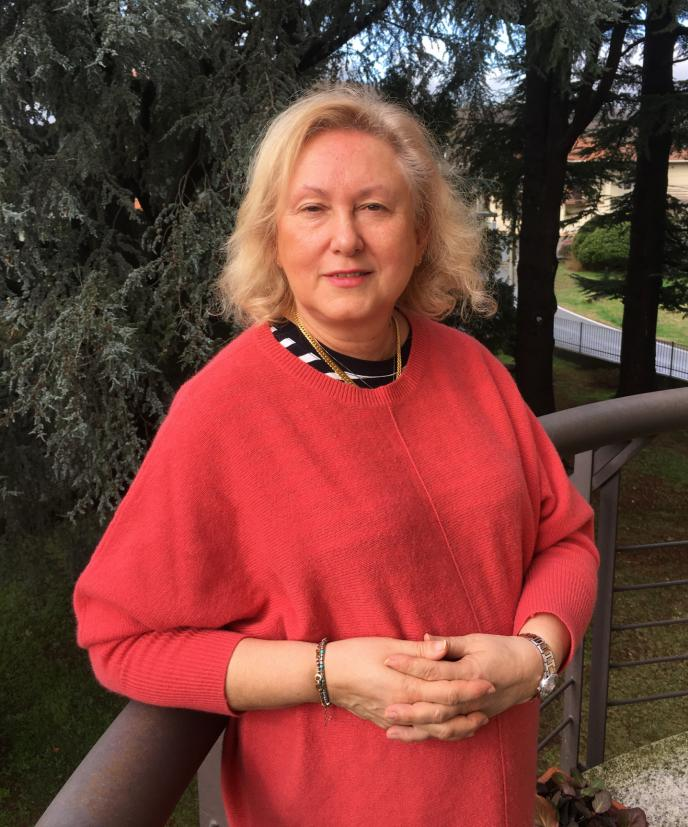
- Franca Franzosi in 2024
- Born: February 10, 1960 (age 66); Milan, Italy
- Occupations: Educator; Art historian
- Notable work: Un episodio della cultura figurativa novarese: Santa Maria di Garbagna e i suoi affreschi quattrocenteschi; Il pulpito di S. Giulio d'Orta
- Spouse: Savio Renato Fornara

Franca Franzosi (born February 10, 1960) is an Italian educator and art historian, known for her studies on the figurative arts of Novarese in the Middle Ages.

== Biography ==
Born in Milan in 1960, daughter of Caterina Gattoni and Giovanni, a company manager in the tire industry for Pirelli and Firestone, sister of Massimo.

=== 1980s ===
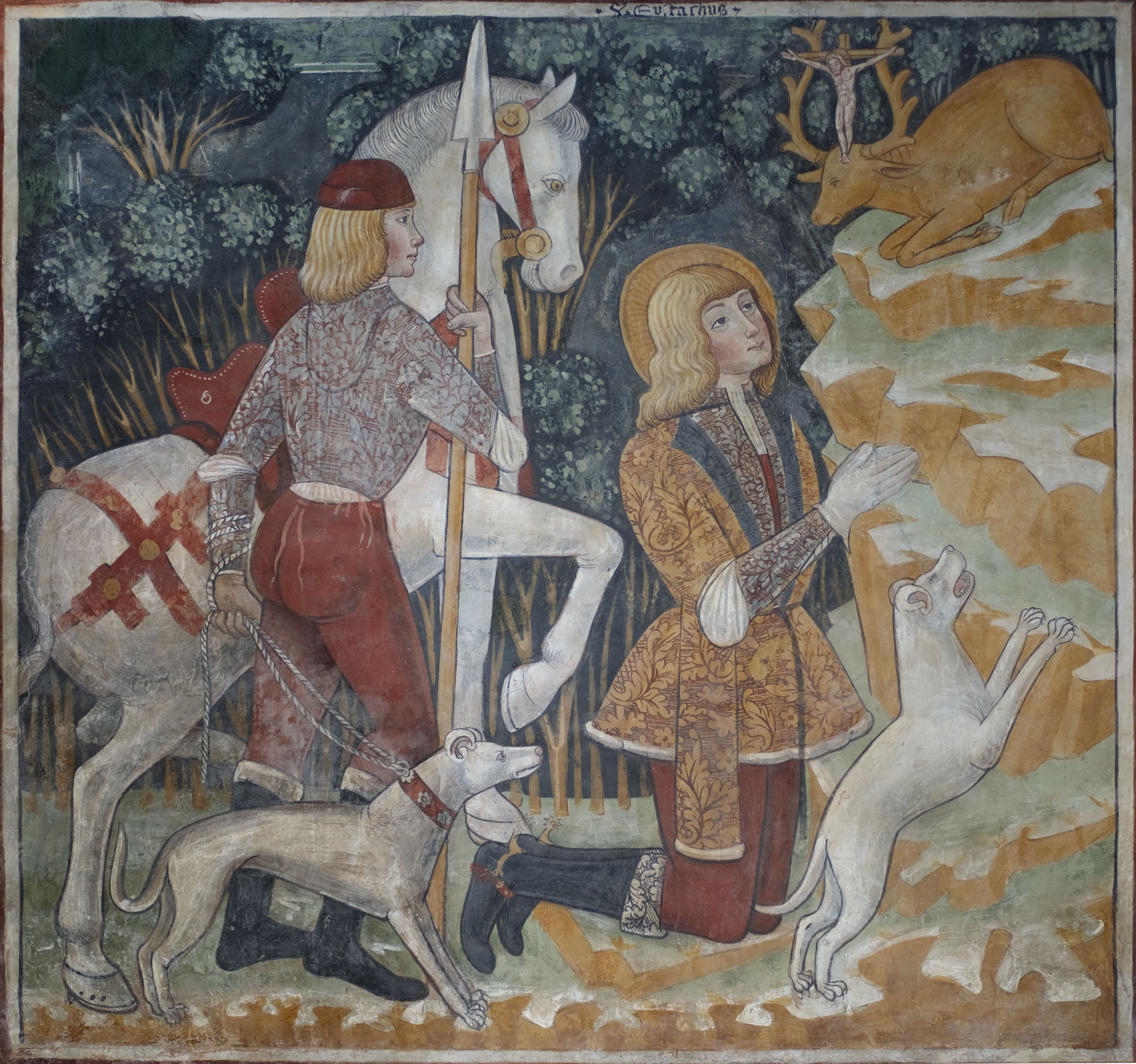
Vision of Saint Eustace - Oratorio di Santa Maria, Garbagna Novarese

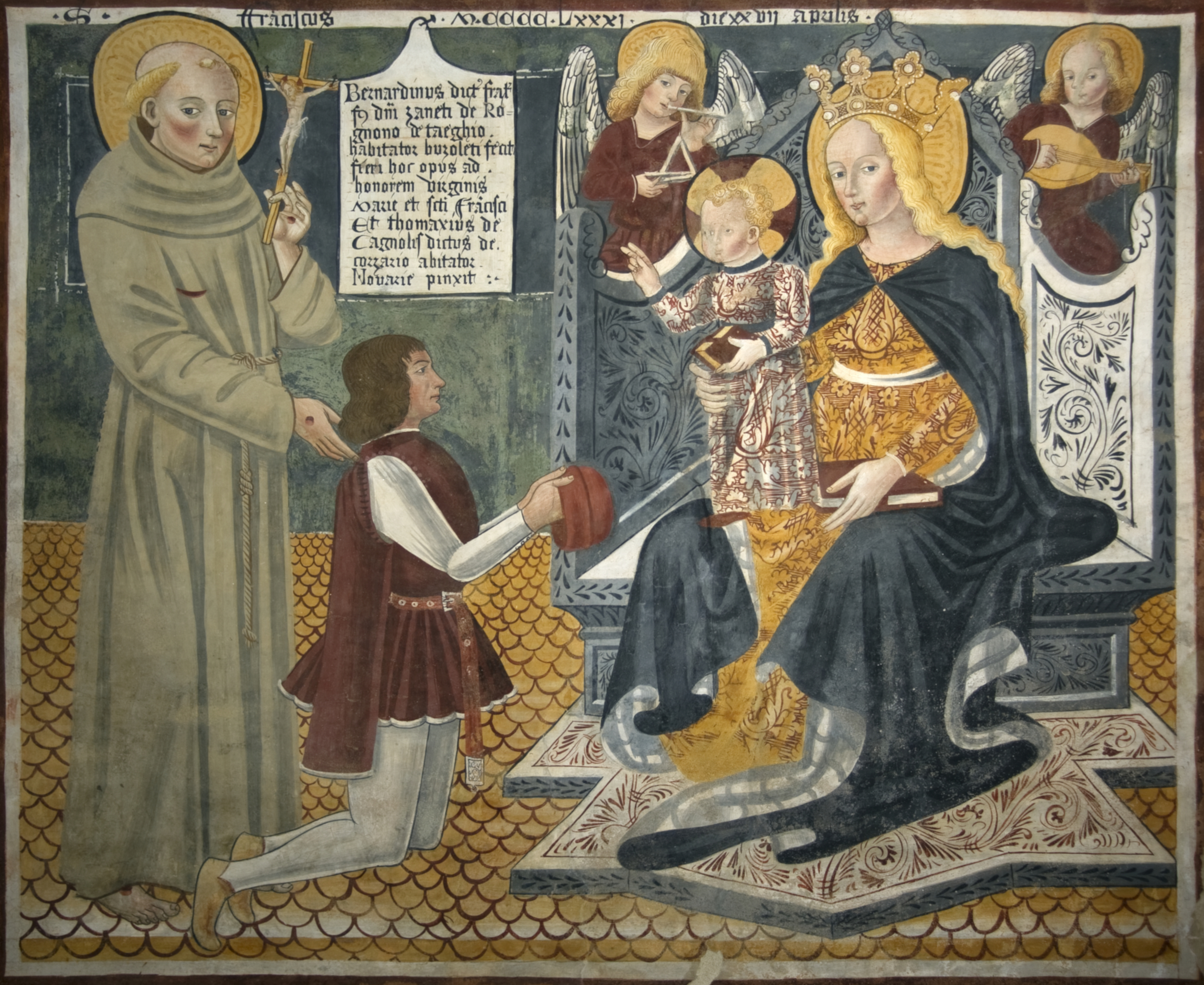
Madonna with Child, two angels and Saint Francis - Oratorio di Santa Maria, Garbagna Novarese

In 1985 she graduated in Modern Literature (Lettere Moderne) at the Università Cattolica del Sacro Cuore in Milan, with a thesis on the frescoes of the Oratorio di Santa Maria in Garbagna Novarese, supervised by Maria Luisa Gatti Perer, a scholar of Lombard art history. The research focused on the limited scholarly attention given to late Gothic figurative culture in the Novara area, highlighting its marginal treatment in both general and local studies. By consulting documents from the Novara Major Hospital held in the State Archive of Novara, the thesis identified the patrons of the frescoes as local rural landowners. The iconographic subjects were examined in relation to their historical context, including the association of Saint Roch with outbreaks of plague and the figure of the Madonna with the renewed Franciscan presence at the Abbey of San Nazzaro della Costa. Additional information emerged from pastoral visitation records preserved in the Diocesan Historical Archive, such as the presence — now lost — of a brick icon above the altar and a fresco of the Madonna on the façade. The study also analysed the activity of Tommaso Cagnola and his workshop, expanding the catalogue of his attributed works through the apse frescoes. The thesis contributed to the understanding of 15th-century art and historical context in the Novara area, which had previously received limited scholarly attention. Due to the significance of the work, it was referenced the following year in the Bollettino Storico per la Provincia di Novara, in 1990 in the journal Arte Lombarda, and in subsequent years it has been cited as a bibliographic source in numerous publications.

In the late 1980s, alongside her teaching activity, she began in-depth research on the Romanesque pulpit of the Basilica di San Giulio. During the same period, she attended advanced studies and was awarded a scholarship from the "Fondazione Fratelli Confalonieri" of Milan.

=== 1990s ===
In 1990 she married Savio Renato Fornara, a doctor in Borgomanero, signing her writings from that moment as Franca Franzosi Fornara.

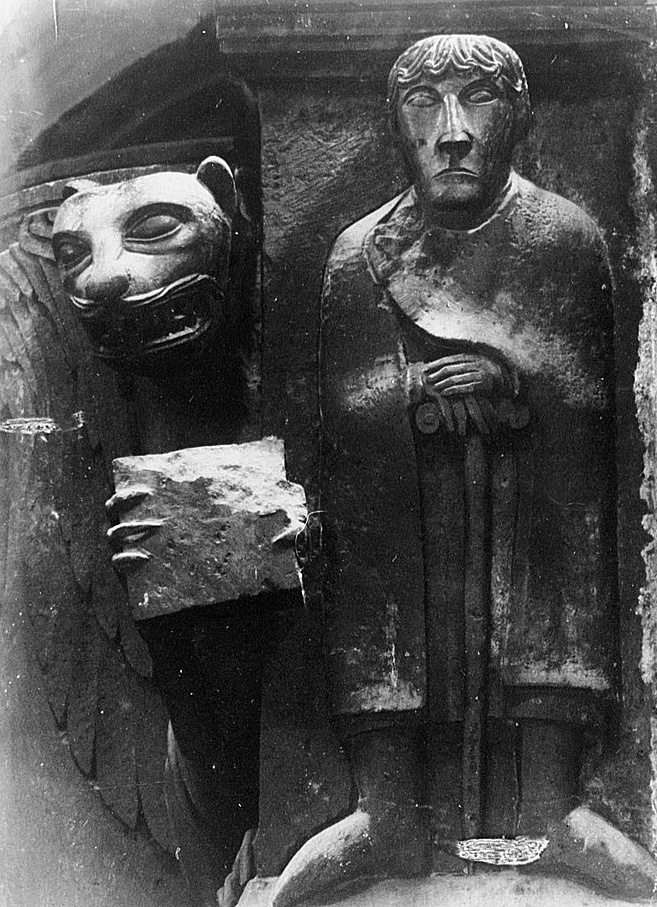
The Man of Orta, whose identity is the enigma of San Giulio

In 1990, critic Roberto Cicala published an article in the Novara periodical L'Azione discussing Franzosi's recent master's thesis. The thesis, the result of research once again conducted under the supervision of Professor Maria Luisa Gatti Perer, offered a groundbreaking interpretation of the enigma of San Giulio — that is, the identity of the male figure sculpted on the pulpit of the Basilica di San Giulio in Orta in the 12th century. It begins by examining earlier theories, which identified the figure as Emperor Otto I of Saxony, Julius of Orta, Paul of Tarsus, or the Benedictine abbot William of Volpiano. The latter interpretation, proposed in 1955 by Roman scholar Beatrice Canestro Chiovenda, was particularly influential and widely cited for many years.

Building on an idea proposed by Mario Perotti of Novara in 1974 — namely, that the sculptures in question do not depict historical figures but rather symbolic representations — she rejected all previous hypotheses. Through an analysis of the clothing, appearance, and attributes of the figure, and by considering thematic parallels from the 12th and 13th centuries, she identified the figure as the prophet Daniel.

An article in the magazine Novara – Notiziario economico (1993) and a section of the volume Segni sul territorio (1995; see section Works) were based on the thesis, sparking many years of lively debate among scholars. In 1991, Canestro Chiovenda published a new work on the island of San Giulio, in which she re-examined the identification proposals put forward after her 1955 publication, including that of Franzosi. While acknowledging that the representation could carry symbolic meanings, she remained convinced of the identification with the Benedictine abbot — an interpretation that would also gain support in France, notably at a 1995 conference on William of Volpiano held in Dijon. In support of Franzosi's thesis were Giancarlo Andenna, who in 1997 confirmed that the sculpture depicts a layman, and art historian Giovanni Rodari, who in 2012 refuted the identification with William of Volpiano. Rodari argued that, in the Middle Ages, it would have been unacceptable to depict a Benedictine abbot on a pulpit — especially one located in a church run by a college of canons — and noted the absence of any connection between the abbot and the other sculpted figures. The most recent contribution to the debate came in 2013 from scholars Piero De Gennaro and Angelo Marzi, in the third monograph dedicated to the pulpit. They distanced themselves from all previous hypotheses, stating that the meaning of the sculptures would certainly have been clear to 12th-century pilgrims, but was later lost, leaving us with an unintelligible expression of a once-known symbolic language.

In 1992, as part of the cultural initiative "Wednesdays at the Gobetti High School" in Omegna — which included various events related to San Giulio Island — she organized a guided tour of the basilica.

During the 1990s, she pursued her personal interests as a member of the Società dei Verbanisti, a group of scholars and enthusiasts dedicated to the history, art, and culture of the lands surrounding Lake Maggiore.

=== 2000s ===
In 2000, on the occasion of the official inauguration of the recently restored fresco by Tommaso Cagnola, she participated in the event in Garbagna Novarese alongside architect Angela Malosso. Franzosi presented a summary of the history of the Oratorio di Santa Maria from the 11th century to the present day, while Malosso outlined the conservation work carried out on the related heritage.

Since 2007, she has taught literature and Latin at the "E. Fermi" Scientific High School in Arona, a position she has held for over a decade.

Returning to the topic of her degree thesis, in the same year she spoke at the Cagnola conference on family studies held in Gozzano, the proceedings of which were published the following year (see section Works).

In 2008, a fresco was uncovered in the church of San Quirico in the cemetery of Orta San Giulio. Franzosi was commissioned to study it and dated it to the 14th century, making it one of the oldest in the Cusio area. She identified it as part of a depiction of the mystical marriage of Saint Catherine of Alexandria. The study was followed by the publication of an essay in which Franzosi addressed the artistic aspects, while Fiorella Mattioli focused on the cultic aspects.

The same year her father died.

== Works ==
Although focused on the Novara area, Franca Franzosi's studies explore the roots of figurative expression within the historical, social, and cultural context of the Late Middle Ages in the Italian peninsula. Her work therefore offers a detailed picture of this period, as illustrated by the following examples.

In studies on the frescoes of religious buildings, scholars frequently reference the influence of the mendicant orders — established between the 12th and 13th centuries as the Church's response to the pauperist propaganda of the Cathars and Waldensians, and particularly active in Italy and southern France. These orders promoted devotion to the Virgin Mary by emphasizing her dual role as Virgin and Mother. At the same time, their preaching contributed to a greater focus on the humanity of Jesus and Mary, and on Mary's intercessory role, which in turn led to a proliferation of artworks centered on her figure. Regarding Mary's humanity, depictions of her sorrow at the death of her son reflect a renewed emotional sensitivity, shaped by the mendicant orders' preaching and by texts such as the Meditationes Vitae Christi, which elevated the concept of Mariae compassio to a level of importance equal to that of the Christi passio. Beyond strictly sacred themes, the effects of Renaissance humanism — emphasizing the human being — are also evident. These are reflected in the lifelike proportions of secular figures compared to sacred ones, and in the physiognomic detail that made individual identities more recognizable.

Analyzing the iconography of the pulpit of the Basilica of San Giulio, further elements of the society and customs of the time emerge. The great emphasis that was given in the Middle Ages to the prophecy of the evangelist John on the Apocalypse and the Last Judgement can be seen in the prominent role of the eagle in the sculptural decoration of the pulpit. The scholar does not fail to underline the strong similarity between the clothing of the angel of Saint Matthew and the habit of the deacons. The reason for the correspondence lies in a specific custom started in the 12th century and linked to the representation of liturgical dramas, according to which the roles of the angels were entrusted to the deacons. This custom was taken up again in the figurative arts, where the angels were depicted in deacon's clothes. An in-depth study is dedicated to the representation of the evil man from whom protection is sought. The figure is symbolized by a centaur, a creature traditionally devoted to the pleasures of the flesh and violence, and characterized by oriental features (almond-shaped eyes and long hair gathered in braids). The choice is linked to the widespread medieval belief that the inhabitants of Asia were among the most dissolute and immoral creatures in the world.

=== Theses ===
- Franca Franzosi (1986). Un episodio della cultura figurativa novarese: Santa Maria di Garbagna e i suoi affreschi quattrocenteschi [An episode of the figurative culture of Novara: Santa Maria of Garbagna and its fifteenth-century frescoes] (Thesis) (in Italian). Maria Luisa Gatti Perer and Franco Mazzini (supervisors). Milan: Università Cattolica del Sacro Cuore – via Comune di Garbagna Novarese.
- Franca Franzosi (1990). Il pulpito di S. Giulio d'Orta [The pulpit of S. Giulio of Orta] (Thesis) (in Italian). Maria Luisa Gatti Perer (supervisor). Milan: Università Cattolica del Sacro Cuore.

=== Articles ===
- Franca Franzosi (1986). "S. Eustachio nel Novarese. Iconografia e culto durante il XV secolo" [Saint Eustace in the Novara area. Iconography and worship during the 15th century]. Novarien. (in Italian) (16). Novara: Interlinea: 96–103.
- Franca Franzosi (1993). "Il pulpito di San Giulio d'Orta" [The pulpit of San Giulio d'Orta]. Novara. Notiziario Economico (in Italian) (2): 43–104.
- Franca Franzosi (2003). "Affreschi in Santa Maria della Rama in Monteregio" [Frescoes in Santa Maria della Rama in Monteregio]. Novarien. (in Italian) (32). Novara: Interlinea: 131–136.
- Franca Franzosi (December 31, 2004). "Le tavole della Colletta di Luzzogno" [The tables of the Colletta di Luzzogno]. Le Rive (in Italian) (6). Gravellona Toce: Press Grafica: 45–50.

=== Chapters ===
- Franca Franzosi (1995). "Il pulpito di San Giulio d'Orta" [The pulpit of San Giulio d'Orta]. Segni sul territorio. Dieci anni di arte e storia nella rivista della Camera di Commercio di Novara [Signs on the territory. Ten years of art and history in the magazine of the Chamber of Commerce of Novara] (in Italian). Novara: Camera di Commercio Industria Artigianato Agricoltura. pp. 14–69.
- Franca Franzosi (1996). "Santa Maria di Campagna a Garbagna". La pianura novarese dal Romanico al XV secolo. Percorsi di arte e architettura religiosa [The Novara plain from the Romanesque to the 15th century. Paths of religious art and architecture] (in Italian). Novara: Interlinea. pp. 122–125. ISBN 88-8212-116-X.
- Franca Franzosi (1998). "San Pietro di Marzalesco". In Battista Beccaria (ed.). Cureggio. Un importante esempio di continuità storica nel novarese dalle origini al XVI secolo [Cureggio. An important example of historical continuity in the Novara area from its origins to the 16th century]. Le colonne (in Italian). Interlinea. pp. 363–399. ISBN 978-8882-121-50-1.
- Franca Franzosi (2001). "La cella di Santa Maria a Proh, L'oratorio di Santa Maria de Agris a Garbagna Novarese" [The cell of Santa Maria in Proh, The Oratorio di Santa Maria de Agris in Garbagna Novarese]. In Gian Piero Colombo; Maria Grazia Porzio (eds.). Segni e tracce di architettura romanica nel novarese. Rilievi e immagini [Signs and traces of Romanesque architecture in the Novara area. Remarks and images]. I segni (in Italian). Interlinea. pp. 71–96, 177-. ISBN 978-8882-123-19-2.

=== Conferences ===
- Franca Franzosi (2008). Aspetti dell'attività artistica di Tommaso Cagnola [Aspects of Tommaso Cagnola's artistic activity]. Study conference, Gozzano, May 19, 2007 (in Italian). Gozzano: Comune di Gozzano, Biblioteca pubblica "Antonio Mazzetta". pp. 48–58.

=== Books ===
- Marco Canali; Franca Franzosi (2015). La Colletta di Luzzogno. Arte e fede nei secoli [The Colletta di Luzzogno. Art and faith over the centuries]. Fragmenta (in Italian). Novara: Stampa Diocesana Novarese.
