= Rodolfo Gambini (painter) =

Italian painter

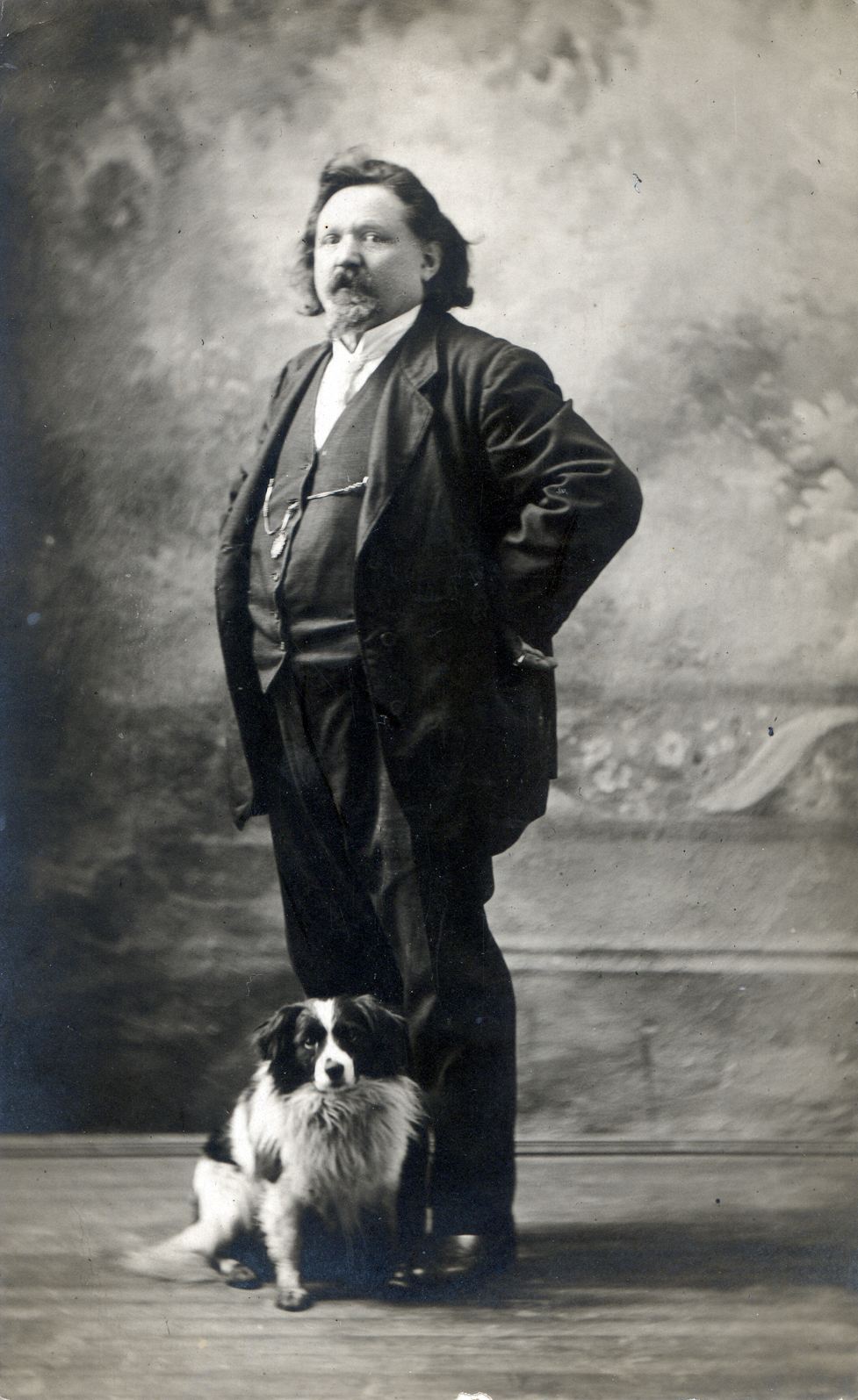
- Rodolfo Gambini in his studio
- Born: Rodolfo Gambini; December 22, 1855; Arluno, Lombardy, Austrian Empire
- Died: March 8, 1928 (aged 72); Alessandria, Italy
- Resting place: Municipal Cemetery, Alessandria
- Known for: Fresco; Painting
- Notable work: Collegiate Church of Sant'Anna (Cagliari); Santa Chiara Cathedral (Iglesias); Saints Peter and Paul Cathedral (Ales)
- Movement: Art Nouveau; Neogothic

Sign of Rodolfo Gambini

Rodolfo Gambini (21 September 1855 – 8 March 1928) was an Italian painter, active mainly in Milan, Lombardy, Piedmont, and Liguria. He painted both history and sacred subjects. He was born in Arluno and died in Alessandria, Piedmont. He studied at the Accademia di Belle Arti di Brera in Milan. Piero Vignoli and Giovanni Ferraboschi were two of his pupils.

He frescoed an Ascent of Christ for the apse for the Duomo (Collegiata of San Lorenzo) of Voghera. He painted in the church of San Francesco ai Cappuccini and the Convent of San Martino in Alessandria. He painted for the parish church of San Nicolò in Pozzolo Formigaro. He painted in the church of the Sacro Cuore in the Abbey of Oulx. He painted in the church of Santa Maria Canale, Tortona. He painted for the Rocca de' Giorgi.

== See also ==
- Fresco
- Belle Époque
