= History of Garbagna Novarese =

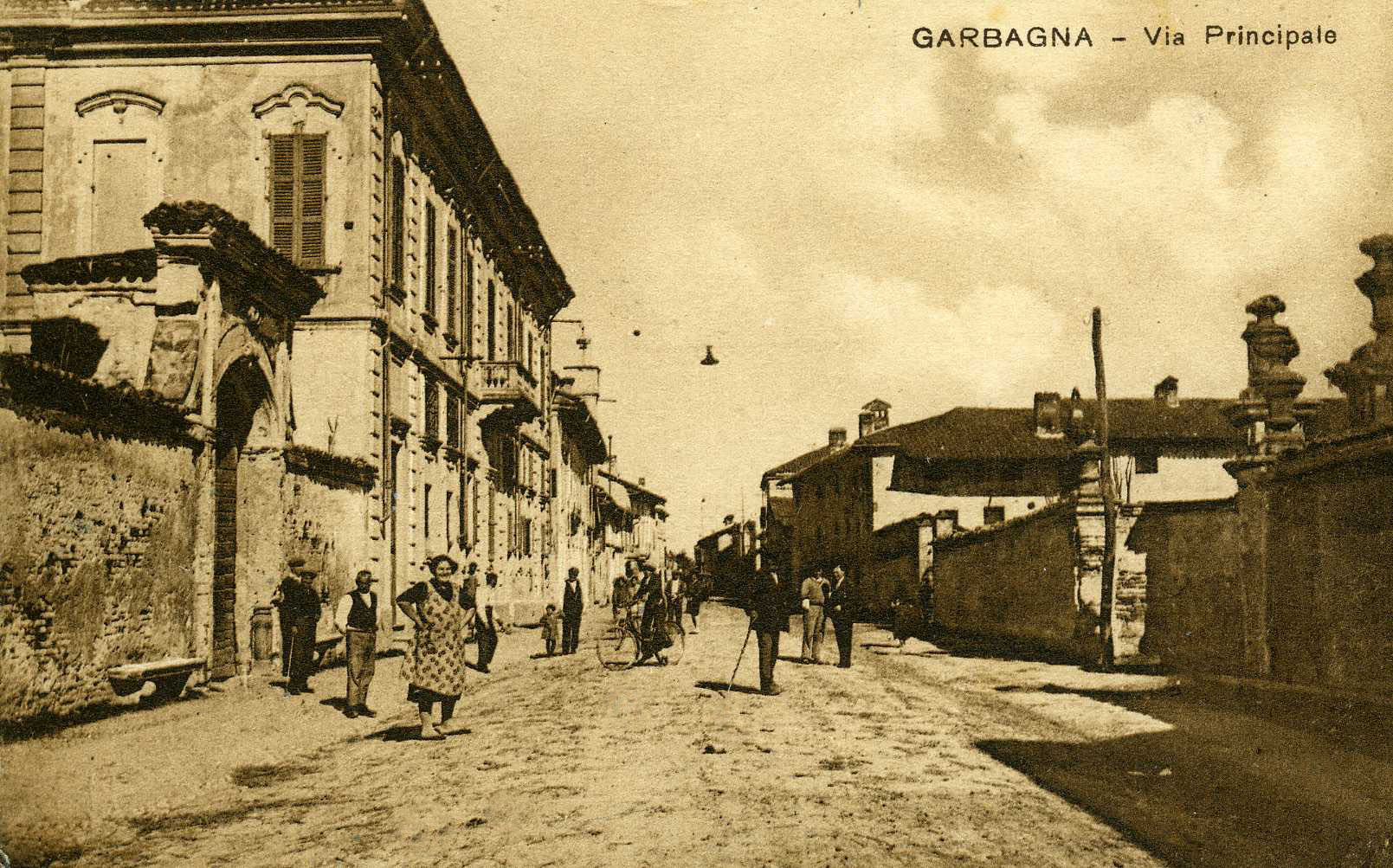
Traditional postcard of the village, depicting the main street

The history of Garbagna Novarese closely follows the major events of the nearby Novara, being part of its countryside (contado).

It appeared in documents by the 9th century. During the Middle ages it was a fief of powerful families from Novara and Lombardy, then it became an autonomous comune during the Modern age.

== Ancient times ==
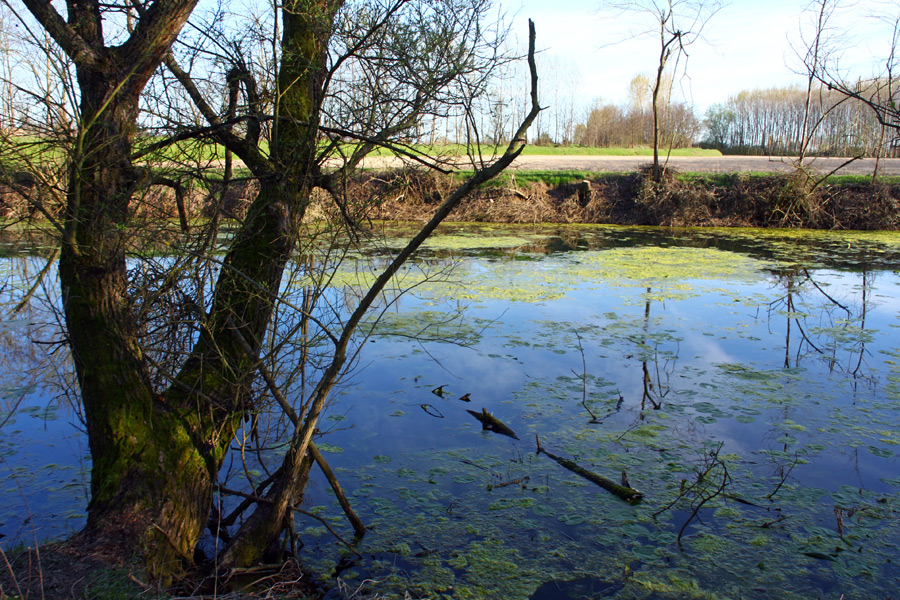
The Agogna Morta (Dead Agogna) park is a typical example of the ancient landscape of the Lower Novarese

The authors who have dealt with the antiquity of the Garbagna area, including Polybius, describe an immense and thick wooded area, a characteristic feature of the entire Novara plain before the advent of the rice fields. The forest extended between the present-day territories of Garbagna, Nibbiola and Vespolate, following the course of the Arbogna stream, on anything but flat terrain, interspersed with meadows, moors, ponds and numerous watercourses. Specifically, the presence of a Laguzzolum (pond) is mentioned. The landscape was also characterized by vast gravel fields and marshes, created by the frequent flooding of the watercourses, especially during snowmelt.

=== Pre-Roman era ===
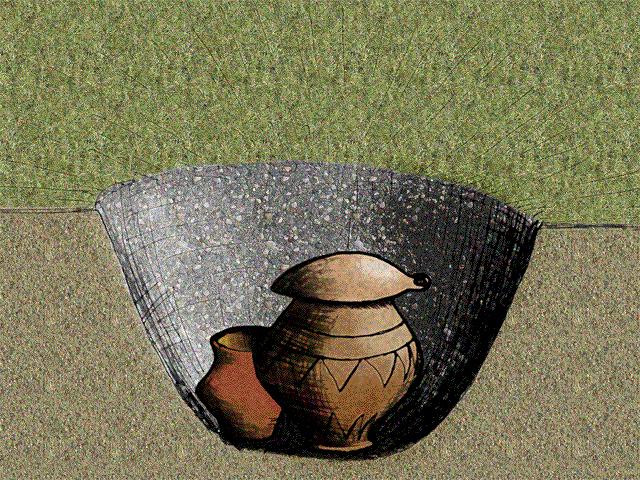
Buried funerary urns

A blow to the past
- In one of the first chapters of his monograph on Garbagna, Lino Cassani highlights the lack of archaeological finds in this municipality, linking it to the negligence of local administrators. He recounts how, many times during land-levelling work to make the land irrigable, ancient funerary urns (the so-called duie) were discovered. Unfortunately, the discoverer systematically smashed them with a shovel, hoping they contained money. Inside, they contained nothing but ash, bone fragments, and a few metal filaments, which were regularly thrown away because they were deemed worthless. None of these finds was ever reported to museums or the Società Storica Novarese. Cassani himself witnessed one of these episodes during his childhood, in 1880, when the innkeeper Angelo Colli was building his house facing the road leading to the church.

The sources describing the settlements of pre-Roman peoples in the Novara area do not provide sufficient detail to determine with certainty which people the Garbagna territory belonged to. Therefore, the following discussion discusses the two peoples who historically lived in the Lower Novara area, and who therefore most likely inhabited Garbagna: Laevi and Vertamocorii.

The first inhabitants of the area were a northern offshoot of the Laevi, a Ligurian population settled mainly in the Pavia area and part of the Golasecca culture. Laevi led a purely Neolithic life: Their activities were hunting, fishing, and growing cereals, therefore their diet was based on meat (a little), fish, soups, broths, and flatbreads. They lived scattered in small clusters of houses, each corresponding to a family group. They preferred a particularly hard and frugal lifestyle, giving maximum importance to their independence. They were settled on the banks of the Arbogna stream, near the current cemetery and chiesa di San Michele.

Although there is no precise temporal location of the presence of the Laevi in the territory of Garbagna, it is known for certain that the Ligurians inhabited the Piedmont area in the 7th century BC.

The suffix -asco in the name of the disappeared locality of Camarasco, still mentioned in documents dating back to the 14th century, reveals the presence of this population of Ligurian origin in the territory of Garbagna.

After several centuries of sporadic Celtic infiltrations, in the 4th century BC there was a massive migration of these peoples across the Alps towards the entire Po Valley, beginning a period of coexistence and integration with the local populations which led to the introduction of the La Tène culture to the detriment of the Golasecca culture. Since the new arrivals were more advanced both politically and economically, the habits and customs of the latter eventually prevailed, slowly leading to the Celticization of Ligurian populations.

Specifically, the Vertamocorii tribe settled in the Novara area, and founded the nearby city of Novara (according to Pliny the Elder). Their presence has several confirmations:

- the discovery of numerous funerary urns and a spindle whorl of proven pre-Roman origin, although not officially reported (see box A blow to the past);
- several references in various documents (especially the Consignationes of 1347) to the presence of a nemus in the centre of the village, near the current chiesa di San Michele: the nemus was a sacred wood dedicated to the cult of the Sun, a typical element of the Celtic religion.

The arrival of these peoples in the Po Valley also brought the Levi into the sphere of influence of the Insubres, the strongest Celtic tribe settled in Mediolanum, which exercised a great influence on the neighbouring populations. The relations with the Insubres were, however, called into question during the various actions undertaken by the Romans in Cisalpine Gaul in the 3rd century BC. As a consequence, the territory of the Levi and the neighbouring Libui (in the Vercelli area) was violently involved during the Roman-Gallic Wars of 196 BC, when groups of Boii crossed the Po and carried out heavy raids against their former allies.

It is also known that these people produced beer and that trade with the Etruscans introduced viticulture.

=== Roman era ===
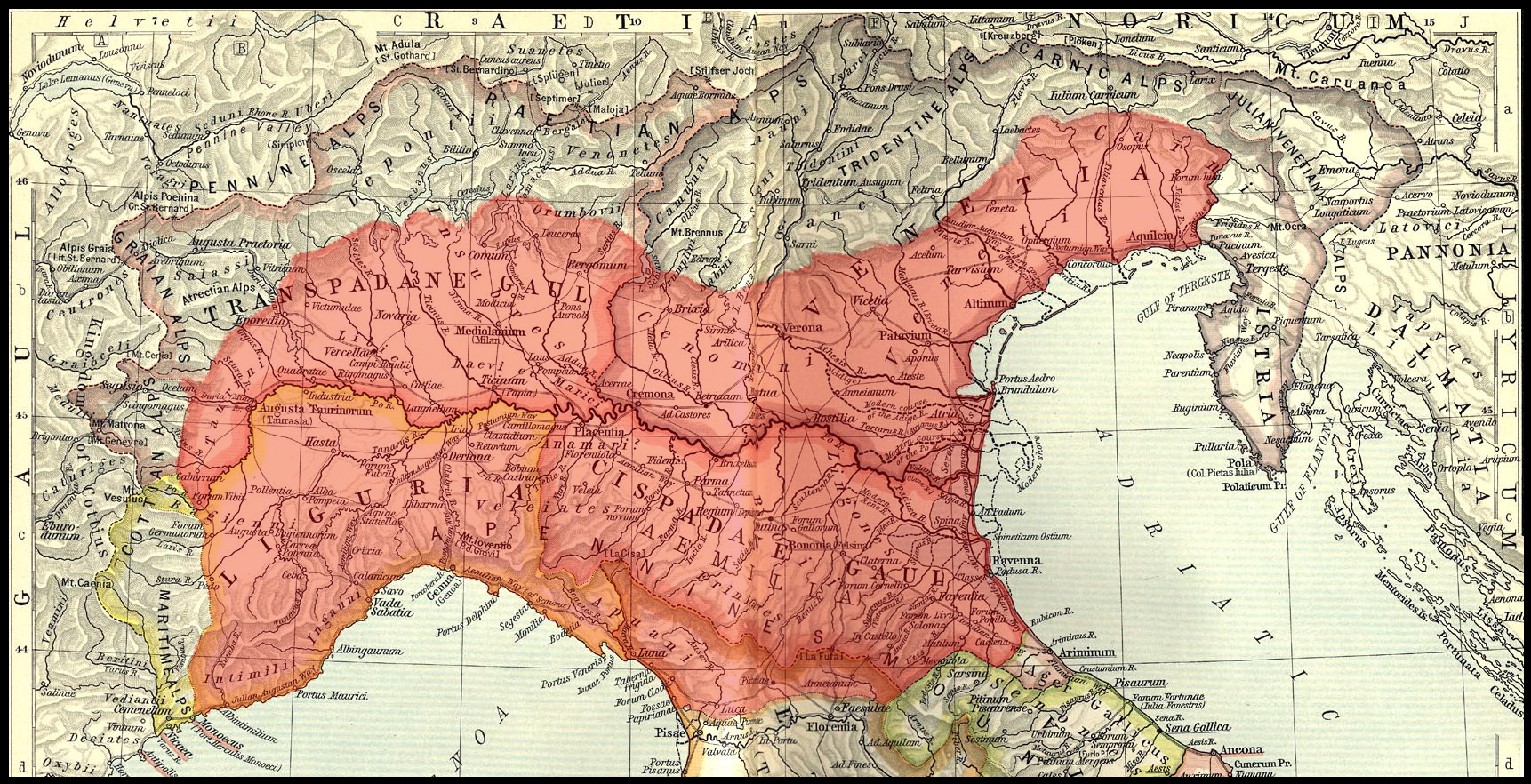
The Cisalpine Gaul

After the defeat of the Celts at Mediolanum in 222 BC, in 220 BC the Romans turned west and occupied the Novara area, but were unable to subjugate it. Agreements were therefore stipulated that guaranteed the locals a certain autonomy, both culturally and legally (foedera). Romanization was further delayed by the arrival of Hannibal during the Second Punic War (219-202 BC), during which Scipio Africanus himself was defeated near the Ticino with the support of the Po Valley peoples allied to the Carthaginian. The conquest of the Novarese continued until 196 BC, at the time of the definitive subjugation of the Celts Insubres, and it became part of the province of Cisalpine Gaul during its establishment, between the 2nd and 1st centuries BC.

In 89 BC, at the end of the Gallic Wars, the Lex Pompeia de Transpadanis was enacted, which granted Latin law (ius Latii, an intermediate level between full Roman citizenship and the status of non-citizen) to all the communities north of the Po that remained loyal to Rome. In this way, Rome concretely consolidated its presence in the Piedmont region.

In 49 BC Gaius Julius Caesar was busy conquering Transalpine Gaul and aimed to facilitate the transit of troops in the Po Valley. He therefore had the Lex Roscia approved, which abolished the province of Cisalpine Gaul, guaranteed Roman citizenship and established the municipii, including that of Novara: Garbagna entered fully into Roman Italy, in the role of vicus, part of the pagus (country district) dependent on the urbs Novaria.

Following the aims of Gaius Julius Caesar, the establishment of the municipium of Novara started the construction of the great roads to connect the Novarese to the rest of the empire. The territory of Garbagna was crossed from north to south by the road that locally connected Novara to Mortara and passed to the west of the village (sometimes identified as via Settimia) crossing the Arbogna torrent not far from chiesa di San Michele, continuing then north towards the Moncucco farmstead. Remains of this paved road (solarium) are still visible in Olengo. The route of this via publica (so named in a document from 881) is only partially identifiable today: it followed the stretches of elevated land that flanked the Arbogna valley, according to the logic of the ridge routes: a road on the ridge is more easily usable, as it is not subject to flooding from watercourses, unlike the valley floor.

Despite its small size, Garbagna certainly had a significant defensive function, given that near the current chiesa di San Michele, on a small hill surrounded on three sides by the Arbogna stream, there stood a castellum, that is, a small fortified camp: the elevated position and the protection offered by the watercourse made it a strategic point for monitoring the surrounding areas. Unfortunately, the Roman military architecture, preferring the use of wood as a building material, has not allowed its conservation.

After the Roman conquest of the Piedmontese area, in 7 BC Augustus ordered the radical reorganization of the entire Italian territory to favour the centralization of power: the eleven Augustan regions were established. In the territory of the former province of Cisalpine Gaul the municipia (administered relatively independently) were abolished and the Novarese became part of the Regio XI Transpadana, which included all the territories north of the Po up to the Oglio river and was headed by Mediolanum.

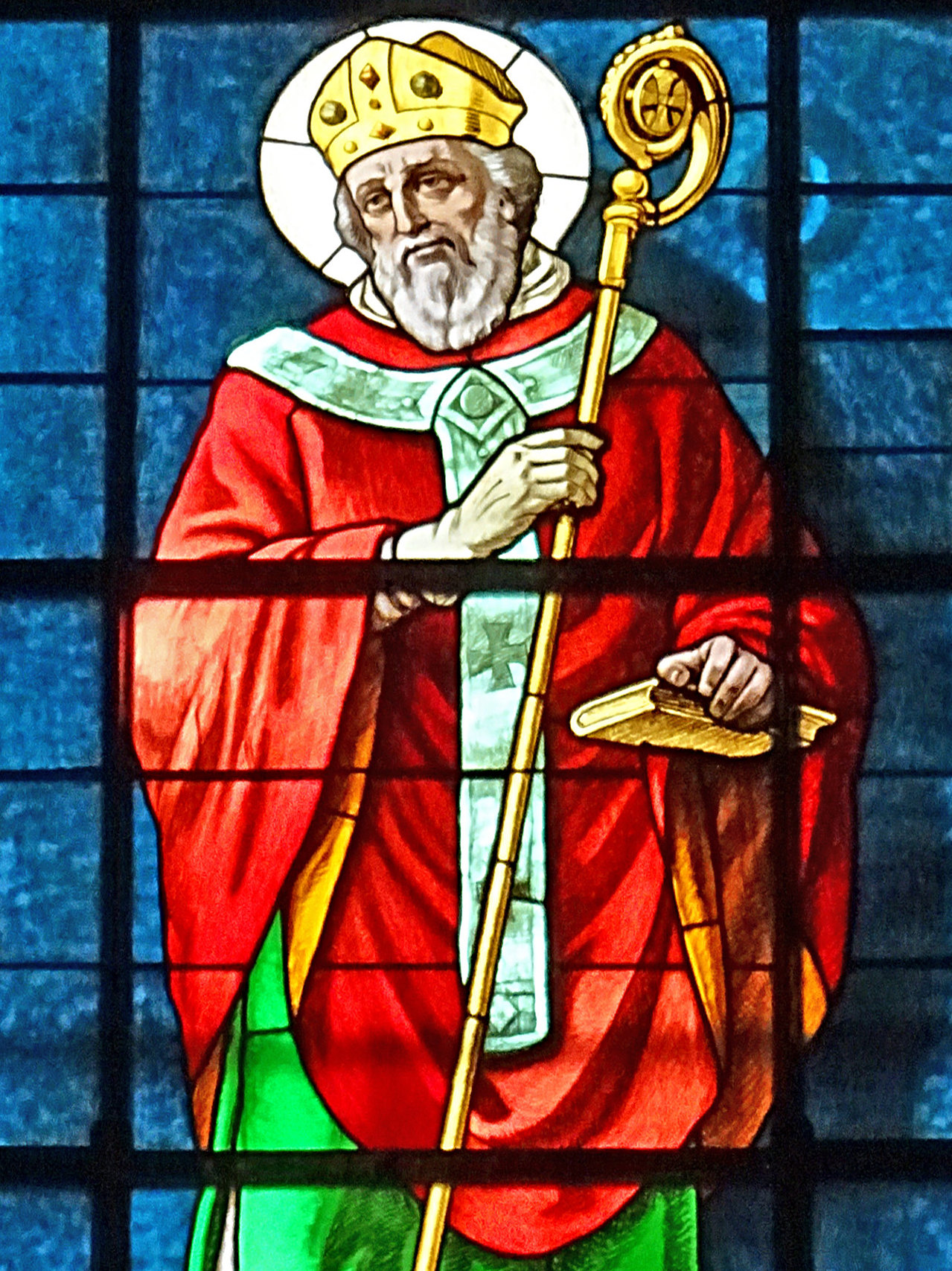
Saint Gaudentius, evangelizer of the Lower Novarese, on a glass of Basilica di San Vittore (Intra)

In 313, Emperor Constantine promulgated the Edict of Milan, which granted freedom of worship throughout the empire. This marked the beginning of the widespread spread of Christianity in Piedmont. Initially, the Novara Christian community depended on the episcopal seat of Vercelli, as Novara did not yet have one. According to tradition, the diocese of Novara was established in 398, with Bishop Gaudentius at its head, who personally took care of the evangelization of the Lower Novara area in the years between the 4th and 5th centuries.

==== Everyday life ====
The works of Polybius and Pliny the Elder provide some insight into life at the time. Agriculture was mainly based on foxtail millet and proso millet, used as a base for various soup-like dishes with vegetables, and the Novara farmers paid particular attention to growing grapes, cereals, and turnips. The vine was entwined with the trunks of poplar trees and produced a rather tart wine. Like the Celtic populations of previous centuries, the Romans shaped the land to favour agriculture, draining the marshes and clearing the moors. In the immense surrounding woodland, hunting was practised for wild boar, roe deer, wild rabbits, and numerous birds, such as quail and pheasant. At the same time, the woods were home to wolves, bears, and foxes, from which it was sometimes necessary to defend oneself with weapons. Finally, in the numerous waterways, fishing was practised for various species of fish, such as trout, pike, carp, bleak and eels.

Another precious resource was the oak, which grew spontaneously in vast forests near watercourses: its acorns were the favourite food of the wild boars, which in turn were hunted for their meat, very appreciated and sought after. At the same time, acorns were the basis of the breeding of pigs, among the fattest and most appreciated of the Italian peninsula.

As in the rest of the Novara countryside, agriculture in the Garbagna area was conducted in domus rusticanae, small family-run farms very similar to today's farmhouses, built of wood and clay and featuring an internal courtyard and well. The agricultural activities of the large urban landowners, on the other hand, took place in villae rusticae, large buildings with specific areas dedicated to the residential use of the owner (pars urbana), the workers (tuguria), and purely agricultural activities.

==== Archaeological finds ====
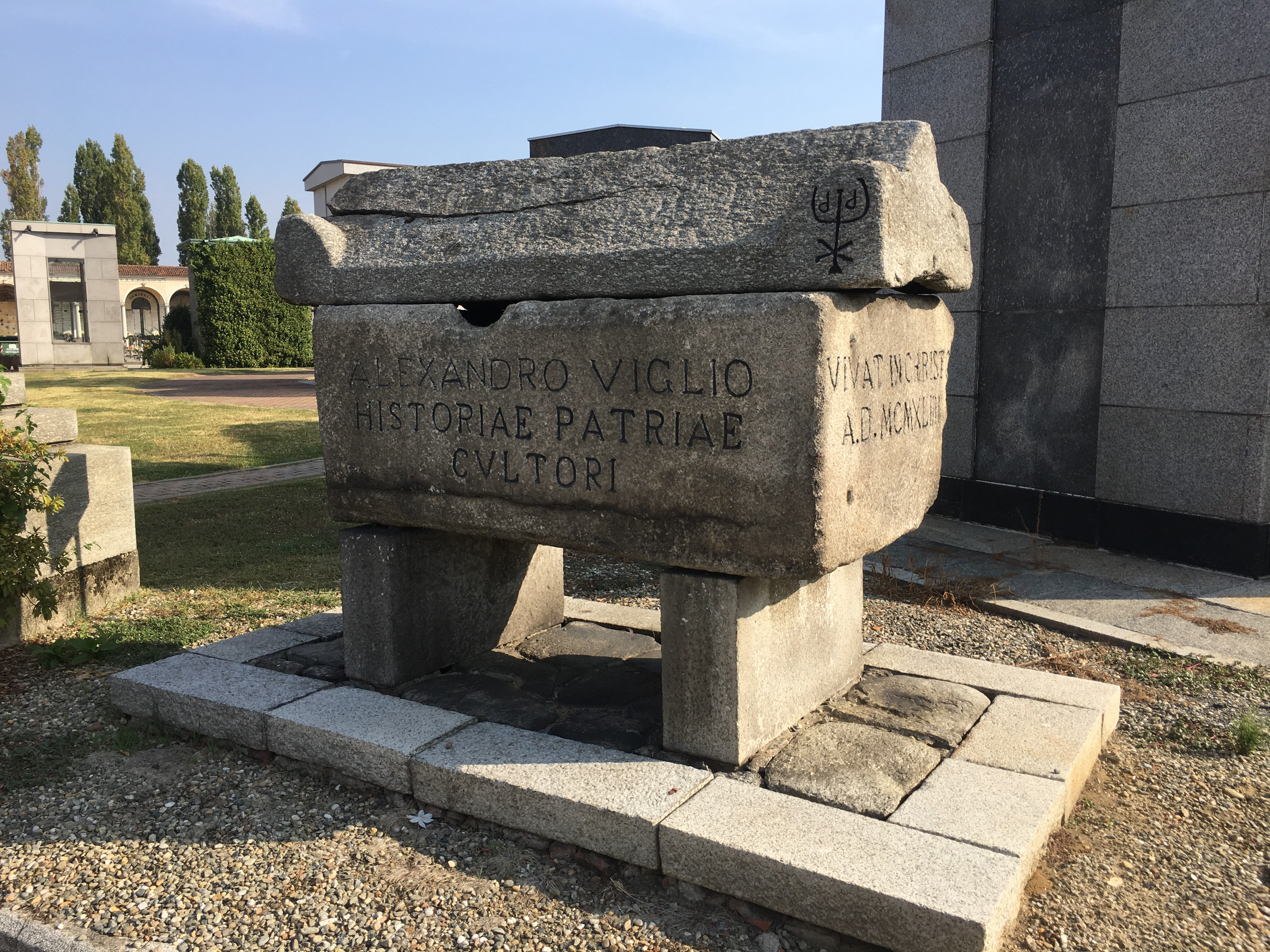
Serizzo gneiss sarcophagus of the Late Imperial Roman period, found in Garbagna

In 1675, the Roman tomb of Atilia Sabina, estimated to be of late imperial age, was found in an unspecified location in the Novara area and sent to Garbagna, in the properties of the Caroelli family.

Further confirmation of the Roman presence in Garbagna is given by the discovery of a large serizzo stone sarcophagus (1.17m x 2.28m) near the cemetery, believed to be from the late imperial period, and of a smaller one (0.40m x 1.25m) in the Mariina farmstead area. In 1944 the large sarcophagus was engraved and placed over the tomb of Alessandro Viglio, member and president of the Società Storica Novarese, in Novara Cemetery.

=== Barbarian invasions ===
In the 5th century, the Novara area was invaded rapidly by various peoples:

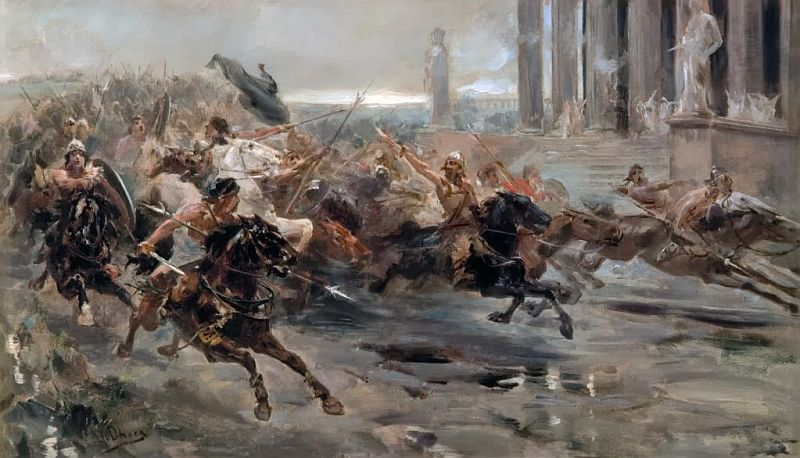
Invasion of the Huns in Italy

- in 402 the Visigoths of Alaric;
- in 405 a band of barbarians of different lineage, survivors of Alaric's army, led Radagaisus;
- in 410 again the Visigoths of Alaric;
- in 452 the Huns of Attila;
- in the years following the conquest of Milan in 489, the Goths of Theodoric, who brought the Novarese into the Ostrogothic Kingdom.

During the Gothic War (535-554), ordered by the Eastern Emperor Justinian to wrest Italy from the Goths, the Novara area was reconquered by the Byzantine troops of Mundila in 538, supported by Isaurian and Thracian contingents. Soon, however, the Goths of Vitiges, with the support of their Burgundian allies, counterattacked. Famine and epidemics followed. Dorino Tuniz suggests the words of Procopius of Caesarea to get an idea of the desperation of the populations involved, including certainly those of the Novara countryside:

They had astonished faces and a fearfully haunted look... they all became gaunt and pale because their flesh, due to malnutrition, was spoiling itself... the great mass ate nothing but nettles, which sprouted in large quantities around the ruins...

— Procopius of Caesarea, The Gothic War

The political and social instability generated by the continuous wars of the 5th and 6th centuries led to a generalised demographic decline and a strong depopulation of the cities, with the flight of the administrators towards the countryside.

Apart from the aforementioned invasions, there is little information about the 5th and 6th centuries. Certainly, at the beginning of the 5th century, the Novarese area was garrisoned by a contingent of Sarmatians from the regions between the Danube and the Don, part of a population of about three hundred thousand people invited by Constantine I himself to settle in various areas of the empire both for the purpose of military surveillance and to integrate the workforce in agriculture.

== Middle ages ==
In the Middle Ages, a stretch of the via Francigena (also known as via Francisca or Romea) was superimposed on the via Settimia, which passed to the west of the village. This road was heavily trafficked by both people and goods.

=== Lombard domination ===
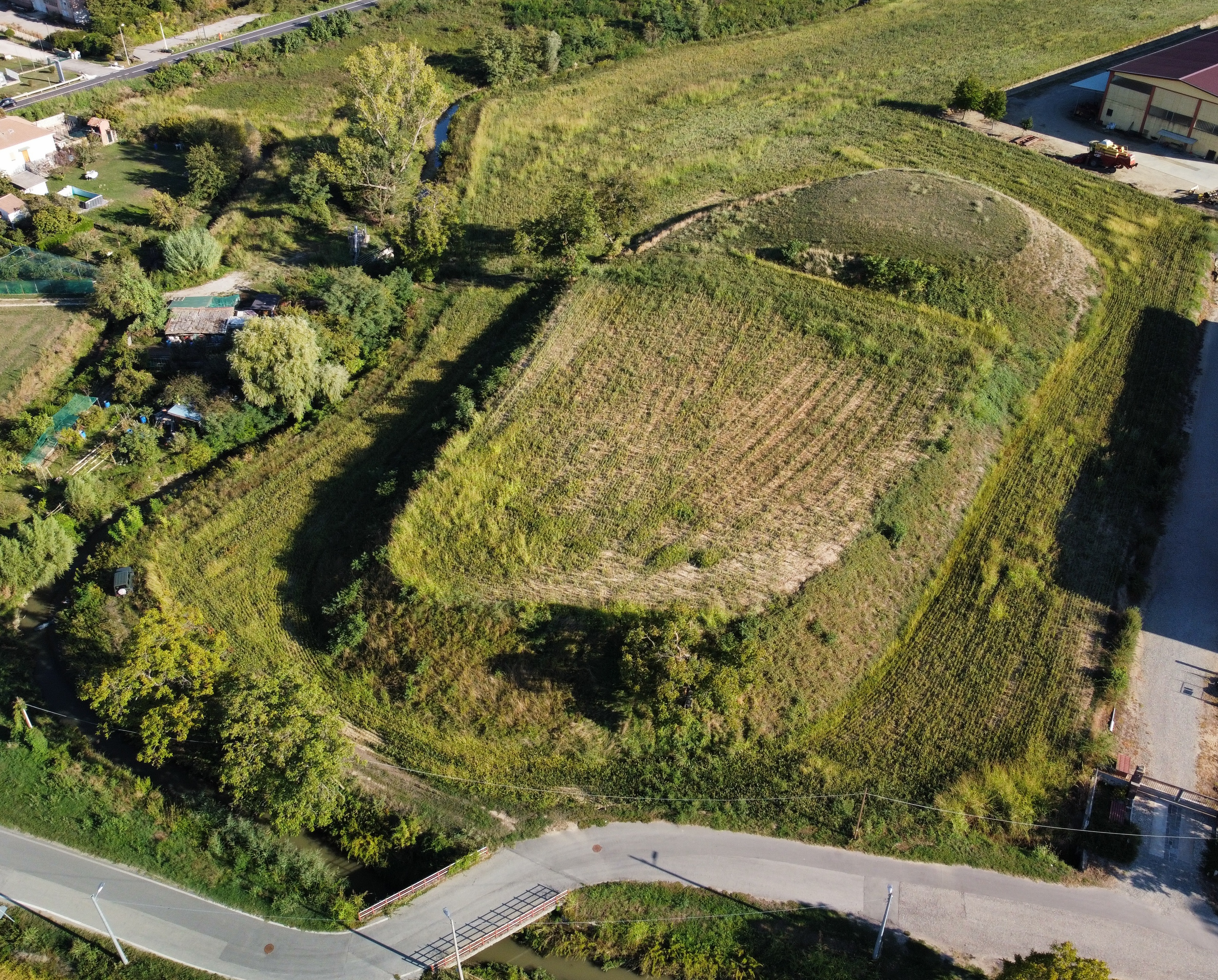
The hill known as "the tower", lapped by the Arbogna stream, ancient site of the Roman castellum and the Lombard fortress

Two centuries of wars, hunger and disease paved the way for the subsequent invasion of the Lombards of Alboin, who reached Novara in 569. Garbagna therefore became part of the Lombard kingdom, whose capital was Pavia.

Specifically, within the political-administrative subdivision of the kingdom into duchies, Garbagna belonged to the Duchy of San Giulio, in the area of Neustria, part of Langobardia Major.

Several authors, including Amleto Rizzi (member of the Società Storica Novarese) and the bishop Carlo Bascapè, agree in attributing to this arrival the characteristics of a migration, which occurred without particular violence or devastation. Silvia Giani offers a clear image of what would have been seen at that time: columns of armed soldiers on horseback, followed by wagons carrying families and belongings. The new arrivals settled in the countryside surrounding the city: open spaces with abundant woods, meadows, and water for the horses. Lombard society was based on army divisions corresponding to family groups (comparable to the Scottish clans), named fare (singular fara), whose initial settlement gave rise to various toponyms still used today, as Fara Novarese. Further contributions to Novara toponymy can be found in the names with the suffix -engo, as Orfengo and Barengo, along with the disappeared villages Scaldasole and Stodegarda, near Sozzago and Vespolate respectively.

In the occupied territories, the Late Imperial principle of hospitalitas was applied, according to which a third of the conquered lands (or of the products of the land) belonged to the Lombard warriors, while the subjugated populations enjoyed personal freedom and could regulate their internal affairs according to the rules of Latin law. Near the settlements, the newcomers used to create real hunting reserves, called gehagi: from this word derive further toponyms, such as Gaggiolo.

Lino Cassani traces the conversion of the Roman castellum, originally built of wood and mortar, to a true masonry fortress during the Lombard period. The population sought refuge inside it from threats from the south, defended by walls, a tower, and a keep, all surrounded by a moat naturally created by the bend of the Arbogna stream. The fortress is documented in later accounts, dating between the 12th and 14th centuries, which explicitly mention tower, dominion, and castle. Even today, the hill on which this fortress stood is known as the tower.

An event of that period is told by Pope Gregory the Great: following the numerous and violent cloudbursts, which hit all of northern Italy, in October of the year 589 the rivers Ticino and Sesia overflowed, breaking their banks in several places and flooding the entire plain in the middle, to the point of forming an immense lake, which remained for several months.

Towards the end of the 7th century, the Lombards converted to Christianity. In place of the previous pagan temple, in Garbagna they erected a Romanesque oratory dedicated to their patron saint Saint Michael, documented from 1181 and located where the current parish church stands, dedicated to the same saint.

The details of the oratory's construction, combined with the Lombard custom of locating cemeteries far from inhabited centres and near buildings dedicated to Saint Michael, have shed some light on the structure of Garbagna at that time. First, it is believed that the cemetery already stood next to the oratory at that time, a proximity confirmed at the end of the 16th century by Ernesto Colli, in the section regarding the demolition and reconstruction of the building for expansion purposes. Consequently, the village could not have arisen where it is currently located, but far from the cemetery: considering the position and the importance of the ancient Roman road to the east (via publica), the construction of the oratorio di Santa Maria in its vicinity in the 11th century and the name villa nova of the area surrounding the tower in the 12th century parchments, Franca Franzosi claims that the villa vetus, location of the inhabited center in the previous centuries, was right near the oratorio di Santa Maria.

At the same time as the conversion, the Lombards began to move to the cities, taking part in city life.

=== Frankish domination ===
In 774, the Franks of Charlemagne defeated the Lombards, but they did not settle en masse in the conquered lands: they simply replaced the rulers with selected members of the Frankish aristocracy loyal to the sovereign, while the lands remained inhabited by the Lombard populations. After the conquest, Garbagna was soon resold to its previous owners.

The Novara territory was divided into political-administrative units, each entrusted to a Frankish ruler called the comes (count). From the word comes, the subdivisions took the name of comitati (or counties). Garbagna was included in the comitatus plumbiensis, headed by Pombia, whose southern borders included Terdobbiate, Nibbiola and Vespolate. Novara and a good part of the lower Novara area were also part of it. The manorialism was also introduced to counteract the presence of many small, scattered villages, which were not very productive and difficult to defend: the population was forced to move towards the larger centres (manors), fortified and administered by officials appointed by the counts.

Parallel to the administrative division of the territory, the Frankish bishops organized the dioceses into compact and highly functional pievi (singular pieve). The pieve churches were located near the major manors, covering a territory of approximately ten kilometres in radius. In addition to carrying out pastoral duties, the parish churches collected the tithe, a tax consisting of a tenth of all produce. Between the 11th and 12th centuries, the diocese of Novara was divided into 35 pievi. Garbagna was part of the pieve of Vespolate, along with Vespolate, Nibbiola, Montarsello, Tornaco, and Vignarello.

With Louis the Pious, the Frankish kings began to delegate power to local bishops through diplomas, since bishops were more popular with the people than foreign rulers.

The first reference to Garbagna in a historical document dates back to the reign of Lothair I, precisely in June 841: Maginardus, viscount of Pombia, donated to the church of San Gaudenzio a manso (farm) in the territory of Garbagna.

Forty years later, on 15 May 881, the Novara notary Maunustus, recording an exchange of lands between the bishop of Novara Ernustus and a certain Pietro free man (small or medium landowner, once a fighter in the Lombard and Carolingian armies), mentioned a vico (small village) Garbaniola not far from Garbagna and near the ancient Roman road (via publica). Focusing on the practice of using the diminutive in toponyms, Aldo Settia believes that it was a little village, smaller and more recent than Garbagna, born from a split from the actual village. From the same document we get other details on Garbagna structure in the 9th century: in its territory was another very small village called Pidungo, located near the path leading to the main centre (via Garbaniasca: the name of the road obtained by merging the name of the destination with the Ligurian suffix -asco is recurrent in the Middle and Lower Novarese, testifying to the presence of this population in the past). However, historical documents do not further mention the two small villages, so it is not possible to know exactly where they were.

With the transfer of power to the local bishops started by Louis the Pious, in the second half of the 10th century the land properties of Garbagna, previously taken from the Lombards, were dispersed: several Frankish nobles donated many plots of land directly to the religious authorities of Novara.

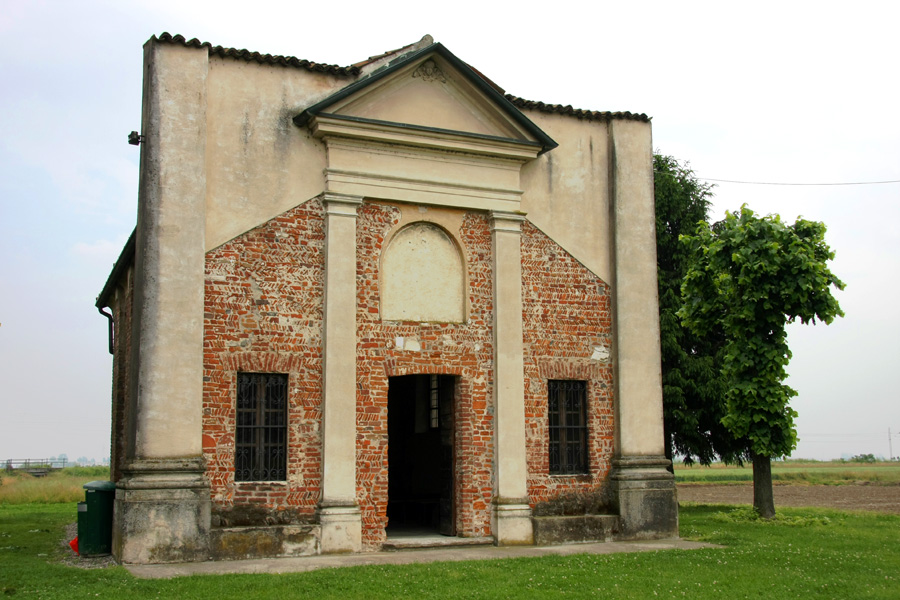
Oratorio di Santa Maria

The construction of the oratorio di Santa Maria is estimated to towards the end of the 11th century, since it appeared among the churches of Garbagna belonging to the pieve of Vespolate.

Towards the mid-12th century, two aristocratic families from Novara owned various properties in Garbagna, including the castle itself: the Da Muro (or De Muro) and the Cavallazzi (or Cavallacius). To defend their dominion against interference from the canons of Santa Maria di Novara and Counts Ottone and Guido, owners of the nearby Olengo castle, they promoted the development of a villa nova near the castle, which, however, would soon fall under the jurisdiction of the Commune of Novara. In fact, the documents report numerous references to the fact that in the 12th century Garbagna was a fief of the Commune of Novara and that several families (castellani) had under management: the aforementioned Da Muro and Cavallazzi, together with the Del Placido.

In the context of the clashes between Guelphs and Ghibellines, a parchment from 1155 reports that, although the bishop still held the temporal power, the Commune of Novara called the De Muro vassals to swear loyalty to the city: among the clauses of the oath there is an explicit order to safeguard the tower, the castle and the dominion of Garbagna.

Further parchments from the same period also describe the transfers of ownership of the lands of Garbagna between the families of castellans and the agreements established between these families regarding the management of the lands. As previously mentioned, all of this was done in compliance with the authority of the Municipality of Novara and without ever considering the still existing authority of the bishop.

It is interesting to note that even in the 12th century a significant part of the signatories of these documents declared themselves to be of Lombard lineage.

There is evidence that in 1272 the Novarese area was invaded by locusts, which destroyed the countryside.

=== Milanese domination ===
In 1331, with the appointment of Giovanni Visconti as bishop, Novarese began its transition to a possession of the Lordship of Milan. In 1354, Galeazzo II, the bishop's nephew, was appointed imperial vicar of Novara and reorganized the Novara area into districts called squadre. Garbagna was assigned to the squadra inferiore, which included all the towns south of Novara.

In the first half of the 14th century, Garbagna began to free itself from the authority of the Commune of Novara, as evidenced by the document of the delivery of ecclesiastical assets of 1347, where for the first time the Commune of Garbagna is explicitly mentioned.

In 1357, Emperor Charles IV decided to resolve a long-running dispute over Novara between Galeazzo II Visconti and John II of Montferrat by handing the city over to the former. John, dissatisfied with the decision, hired the White Company in 1362 (Compagnia de' Bretoni) ruled by the German Albert Sterz, composed of several thousand English mercenaries, to ravage the Novara area. Famine and plague ensued, killing two-thirds of the population. Garbagna was not spared.

In 1395, with the nomination of Gian Galeazzo Visconti, son of Galeazzo II, as duke, the process of subjugation of the Novarese to Milan was completed: its territory became part of the Duchy of Milan and would remain so until the beginning of the 18th century.

Between 1447 and 1449, Francesco Sforza took possession of the Duchy of Milan. Those years were a period of tranquillity and strong economic development for the Duchy. The practice of water-meadow spread in the Novara area, leading to a notable increase in livestock farming, the breeding of silkworms, which filled the countryside with rows of mulberry trees, and the appearance of rice.

In 1460, Francesco Sforza issued new statutes that marked the end of the commune order of Novara, transferring power to the aristocratic class (council of the decurions). At the same time, the policy started by the Visconti of removing lands from the jurisdiction of Novara by assigning them to new feudal lords, people belonging to the great families (mostly Lombard) who had contributed to the Milanese cause, continued. In this context, on 14 January 1464 (or 1467, according to some sources) Garbagna was enfeoffed to Corrado Della Porta, whose family would maintain the fiefdom until 1756.

The 15th century saw a long and violent dispute over the Novarese between the France and the Spain, with the passage and permanence of French, Swiss and Spanish armies. In 1535, upon the death of the last Sforza, Francesco II, the Duchy of Milan, and therefore also the Novarese, was occupied by the Spanish.

== Modern age ==
On 25 February 1526, Novara was forced by the governor of the Duchy of Milan to swear allegiance to the emperor Charles V of Habsburg: this brought the Novara area under the influence of Spain.

At the end of the 16th century, the Romanesque oratory built by the Lombards was replaced by the current chiesa di San Michele.

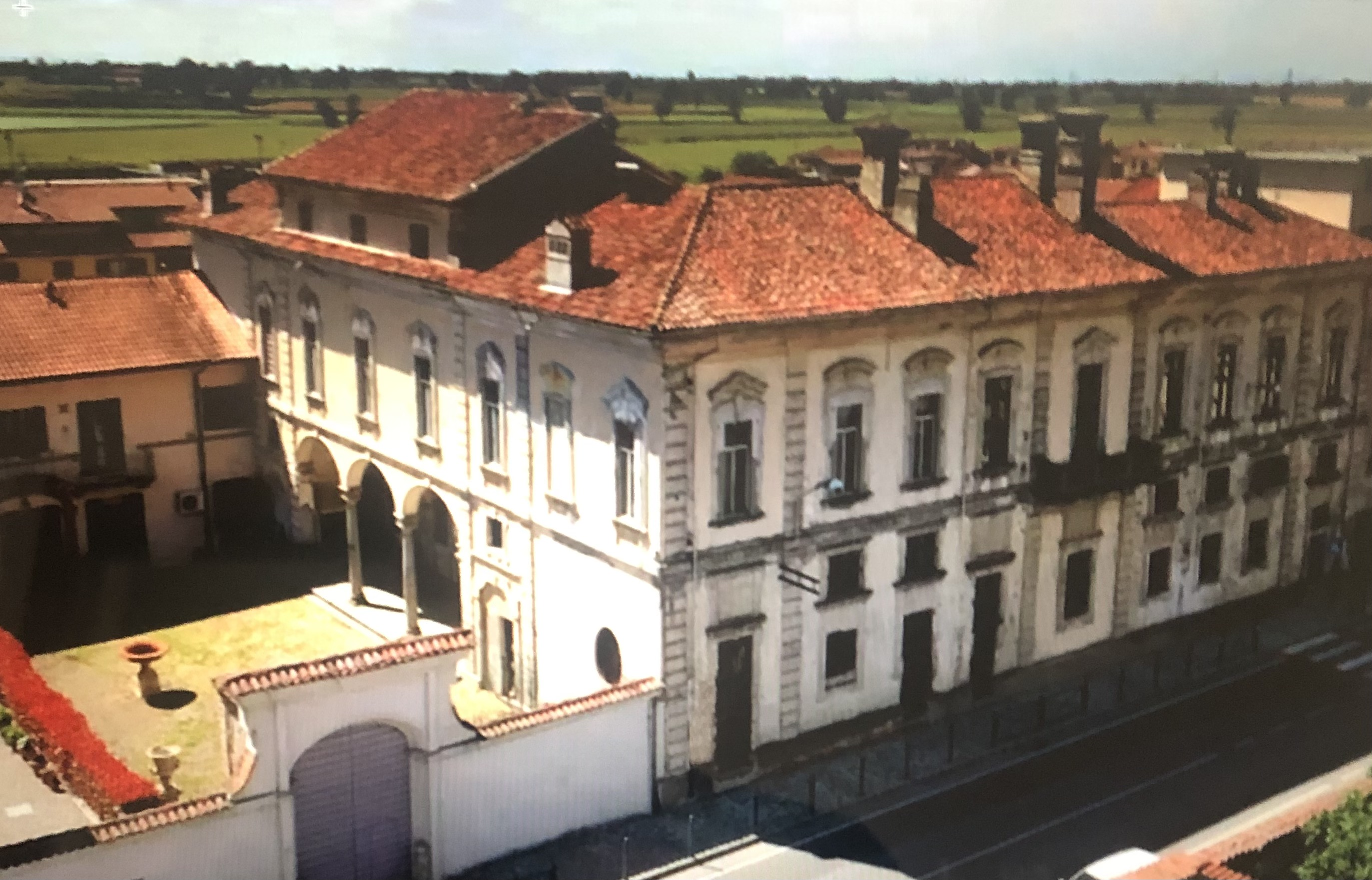
Palazzo Caroelli

In 1772, the fiefdom of Garbagna passed to the Marquis Luigi Caroelli and the construction of Palazzo Caroelli is estimated to be in the same century.

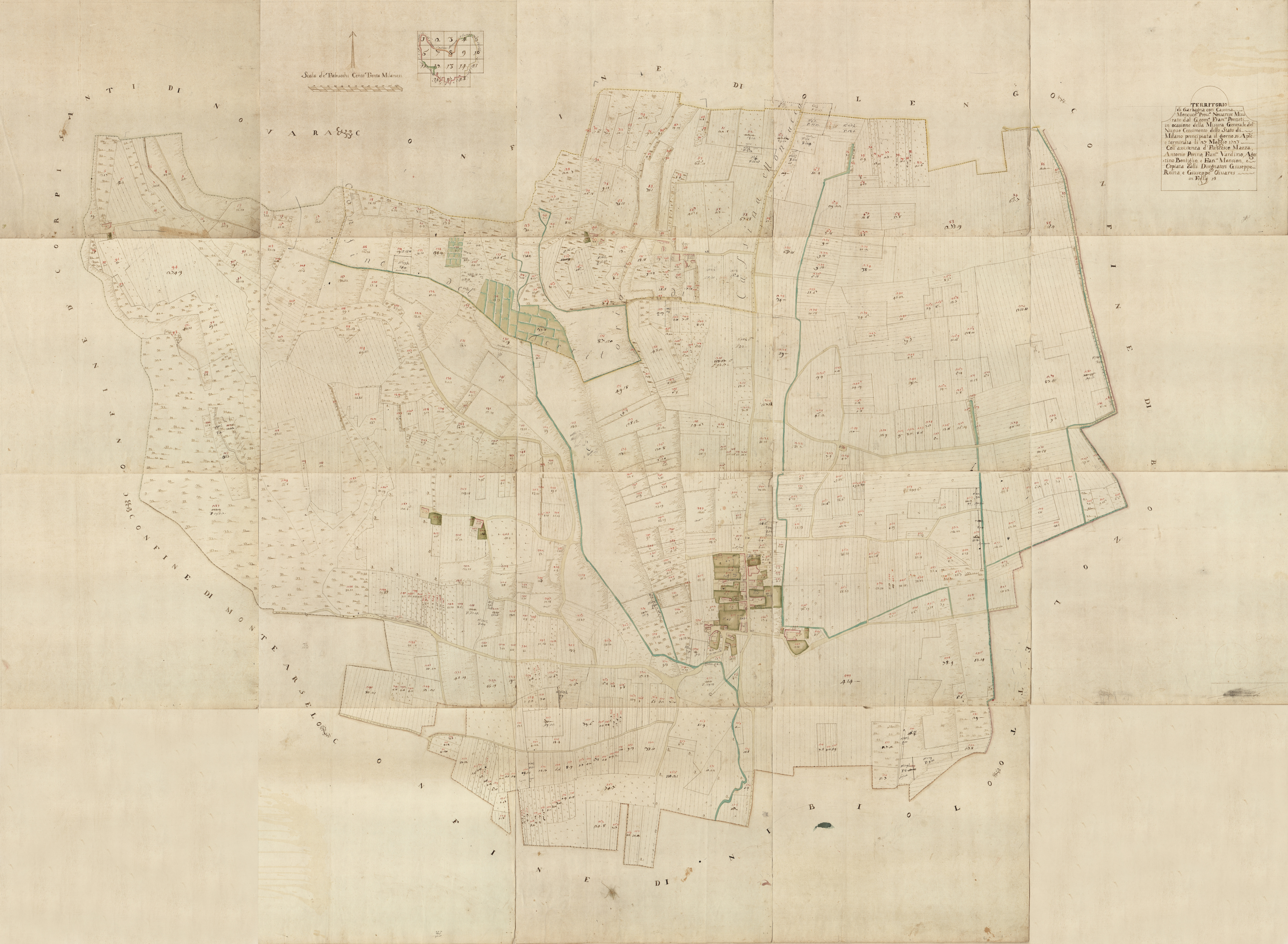
Garbagna in the Theresian Cadastre (1723)

From the 18th century, Garbagna's influence extended to the neighbouring territories of Moncucco and Buzzoletto with Calzavacca, which until the 17th century had been small independent municipalities, part of the Novara Contado, specifically the Squadra di Vespolate. These municipalities were then suppressed during the 18th century, absorbed by Garbagna.

== Contemporary age ==
From 1800 to 1814, during the Napoleonic era, Garbagna was part of the Department of Agogna, district of Novara. In those years the localities of Buzzoletto and Moncucco were not considered dependencies of Garbagna, but of Olengo.

Following the abandonment of Novara by French troops, in 1815 the Austrian army occupied the village, requisitioning all means of transport during the passage of the troops.

On 6 August 1823, a hailstorm completely destroyed the crops.

A textbook ruling
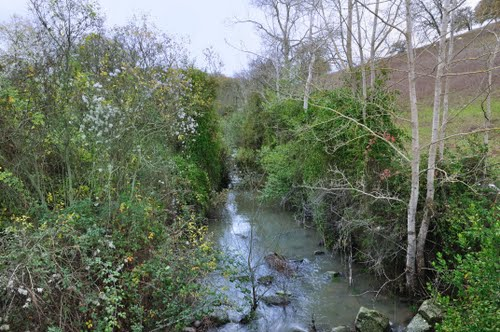
- On 10 August 1841 the Senate of Casale, the court of appeal for ordinary trials of the Kingdom of Sardinia, issued a landmark ruling on a story set entirely in Garbagna: the litigants were the parish priest Giovanni De Paoli, supported by the entire community of the village, and Francesco Antonio Cavalli, owner of the Marijna farmstead. The Rì stream, the disputed matter De Paoli reported that the course of the Rì ran alongside various lands, including, in order, that of Cavalli and that of the parish. Its waters had always been exploited by the landowners for irrigation purposes, leaving the excess to flow. Recently, Cavalli, claiming exclusive rights to it, had diverted it toward his rice fields, then redirecting its course toward Vespolate. De Paoli maintained that Cavalli had no right to do so, since the Rì was considered public, as it was fed by natural sources. Cavalli contested the reasons given by De Paoli, deeming them insufficient to consider the waters of the Rì public, since they came from land owned by him; therefore, no one downstream could have made claims on them. The Senate determined that during that very dry summer, the parish land had been parched by Cavalli's actions, threatening the harvest. It therefore ruled that ownership of the stream was not sufficient to permit its use at will, and that its location and the characteristics of its waters needed to be examined: the stream was fed by both natural waters, waters flowing from bordering properties, and waters drawn from springs in the municipality of Garbagna. The soil of these watercourses had always been considered part of the bordering lands, and therefore their exploitation was the responsibility of all respective owners. Cavalli's statements were also intrinsically contradictory, as he himself confirmed that the stream was partly fed by water from other people's land; consequently, he himself would only be permitted to use it and then return the surplus. Private ownership of the waters lasted until they naturally flowed away from the property, following their own course. For these reasons the Senate, represented by Giacomo Giovanetti and Urbano Rattazzi (among others), required Cavalli, after irrigating his lands, to return the water for the benefit of users downstream. The provisions of this ruling, relating to the ownership and use of water and the relationships between its users upstream and downstream, were taken as a model and cited in various works of jurisprudence, at least until the end of the nineteenth century. Giovanetti himself, advisor to Charles Albert, would have in 1844 put all the experience accumulated on water management into the work Du régime des eaux et particulièrement de celles qui servent aux irrigations, written at the request of the French government.

=== Risorgimento ===
During the Battle of Novara of 23 March 1849, at the end of the First Italian War of Independence, Garbagna was only marginally involved in the war events. On 19 March, during the preparations for the battle, the village was occupied by troops of the 1st division of the Piedmontese army, under the command of General Giovanni Durando, together with Vespolate and Terdobbiate. The stretch of road between Novara and Albonese was instead patrolled by the reserve division, under the command of the Duke of Savoy Victor Emmanuel (the future King Victor Emmanuel II). On the evening of the 20th, however, Durando received orders from General Chrzanowski to move south, between Vespolate and Mortara. On the evening of the 22nd, the scouts of the 2nd Austrian Army Corps finally arrived in the village, sent on reconnaissance by field marshal Konstantin d'Aspre, who had just reached Vespolate. It was from Garbagna that the Austrian vanguards set out at 10 o'clock the following morning in the direction of Novara, and at 11 o'clock they were sighted near Bicocca and involved in the first clash of the battle that would continue until the evening. At 2.30 pm the first detachments of the 3rd Army Corps arrived in the village, to help the now exhausted 2nd Corps. Garbagna's marginal involvement consisted of the seizure of oxen and fodder by Austrian troops, which the municipality measured at 306,023.90 Piedmontese lire. The following year, a request for compensation for damages was forwarded to the General Intendancy of Novara.

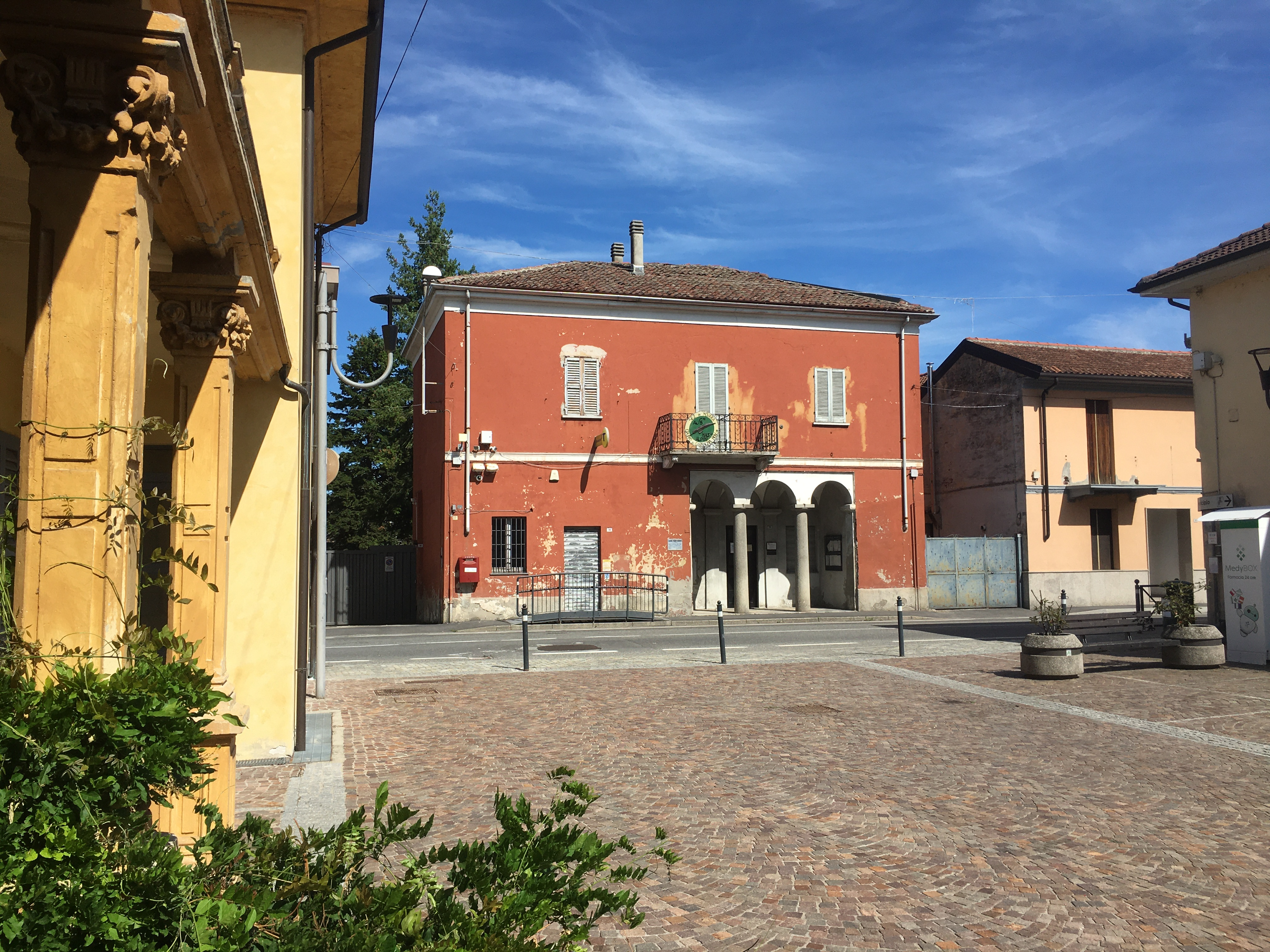
The old town hall from 1849, currently used as a post office, clinic and headquarters of the local Alpini Group

Also in 1849, the town hall was built, which served this purpose until 1940.

During the Second Italian War of Independence, between May and June 1859, the Austrians occupied Garbagna. Once the occupation was completed, they arrested the deputy mayor Pasquale Montalenti and held him for several hours, repeating threats of execution and looting of the village if food and fodder were not delivered. Each objection was followed by insults and appalling violence. This situation lasted for the entire duration of the occupation. One day, finding neither a mayor nor a deputy mayor, the Austrian commander, on his own authority, appointed a young man from the village mayor and ordered the requisition of food and livestock, despite the village being by then exhausted, along with the usual threats of death and looting. Finally, to avenge the absence of both a mayor and deputy mayor, the occupiers looted and vandalized numerous houses and stables.

In the 15 years following the unification of Italy, the kingdom's army was supported by the Guardia nazionale, created with the French National Guard as a model: Garbagna contributed 71 men (62 regulars and 9 reserves).

Following the resolution of the municipal council of 25 November 1862 and the subsequent royal decree of 8 April 1863 n. 1234, on 31 May the official name of the village changed from Garbagna to Garbagna Novarese.

Lino Cassani reports that in 1877 or 1878 the farmer Bernardino Pollastri demolished the last section of the tower, the fortress of medieval origin that stood near the Arbogna torrent, with the aim of obtaining agricultural land that could be easily ploughed and irrigated.

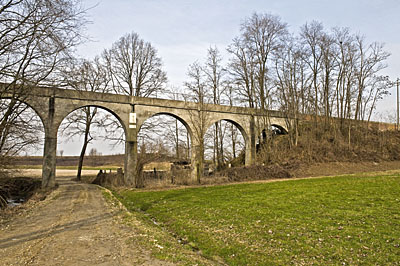
The Vallazza aqueduct bridge, from south

In those same years, two brothers from Nibbiola, Costantino and Vincenzo Bevilacqua, were among the main proponents of the construction of the Cavo Ricca, which would have brought irrigation water from the Cavour Canal to vast lands in the Lower Novarese area. After the free concession of land for the passage of the cable through the Garbagna area (easily obtained, since Costantino was a member of the Garbagnese municipal council at the time), the construction of the section to Nibbiola encountered the problem of the significant difference in height of the Rì valley, located perpendicular to the path of the cable. Vincenzo Bevilacqua, surveyor and technical expert for the municipality of Nibbiola, solved the problem by designing a colossal six-arched masonry aqueduct bridge (sometimes referred to as a dam or aqueduct) in the Vallazza region, on the border between the municipalities of Garbagna and Nibbiola. A canal guard was appointed to guard the bridge, housed in the adjacent house (Casa Vallazza) and almost always from Nibbiola.

In 1883, the existence of an Associazione degli agricoltori ed operai (Association of Farmers and Workers) in Garbagna is certain, whose bylaws were listed by the Royal Deputation of National History in the series Italian Historical Library. Unfortunately, current sources do not provide further details, except that the bylaws were printed by the Miglio printing house in Novara.

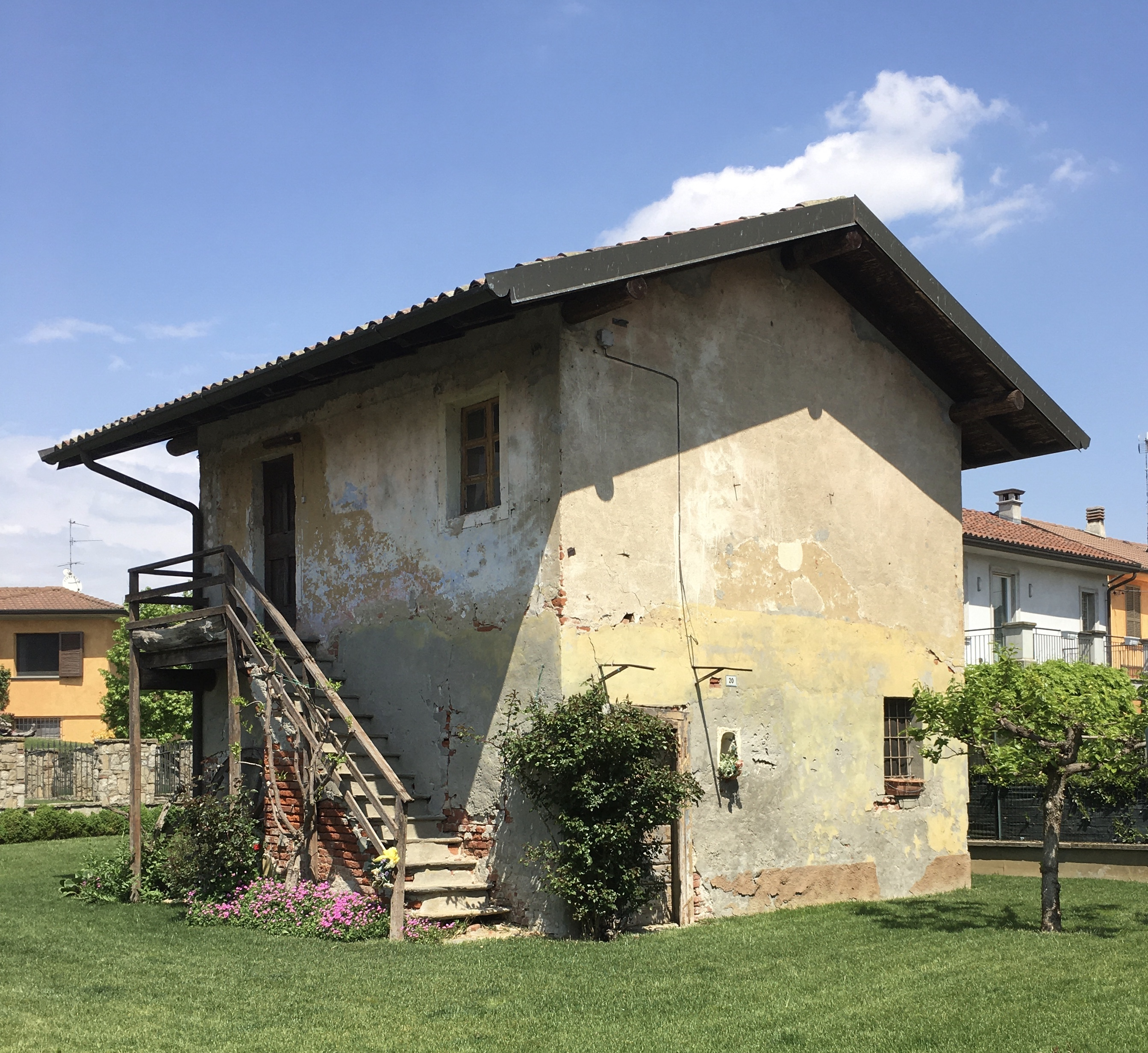
Rural house of Garbagna, built in 1892

At the beginning of the 20th century, the modest industrial fabric reflected the economy's still strictly agricultural roots. Farm owners polished the rice grown on their own estates (Brustia in Moncucco, Ferraris in Marijna, Gallina in Calzavacca, Pollini and Soldani in Buzzoletto, Geri), while several companies produced dairy products (Comelli, Paracchini, Rigone, and Ticozzi) and stracchino (Invernizzi).

Between June and July 1909, farmers Carlo Chiesa and Camillo Buslacchi founded the Società anonima cooperativa di consumo in Garbagna Novarese (Consumer Cooperative in Garbagna Novarese), with the aim of providing members with basic necessities at prices as close to cost as possible, with preferential payment options. Only the most vulnerable segments of the population could join: farmers, workers, and employees.

=== First World War ===
Garbagna had eighteen victims in the First World War, commemorated by a plaque placed on 11 February 1919 at the local cemetery. The dedication reads: Garbagna, in memory of its brave sons who fell in the Fourth Italian War of Independence this monument is erected.

The file of fallen Andrea Fortina, compiled during the conflict and containing his birth and death certificates and two photographs, was donated by the Municipality to the Institute for the History of the Italian Risorgimento, as it was historically significant. As of 2022, this file is freely available on the website of the Central Museum of the Risorgimento, where the files of Giuseppe Frego and Carlo Raffaele, natives of Garbagna but transferred elsewhere, are also available.

=== First post-war period ===
After the First World War, Garbagna experienced the first migratory flows in its history: many of the inhabitants moved to nearby Novara, searching for better opportunities, while people, mostly from the Veneto, took their place. Only a small part of the original families remained in the village, and they then had to integrate with people of different natures and traditions. In this regard, Lino Cassani emphasized the invaluable care and prudence of the parish priest Carlo De Gasperis in managing that important change.

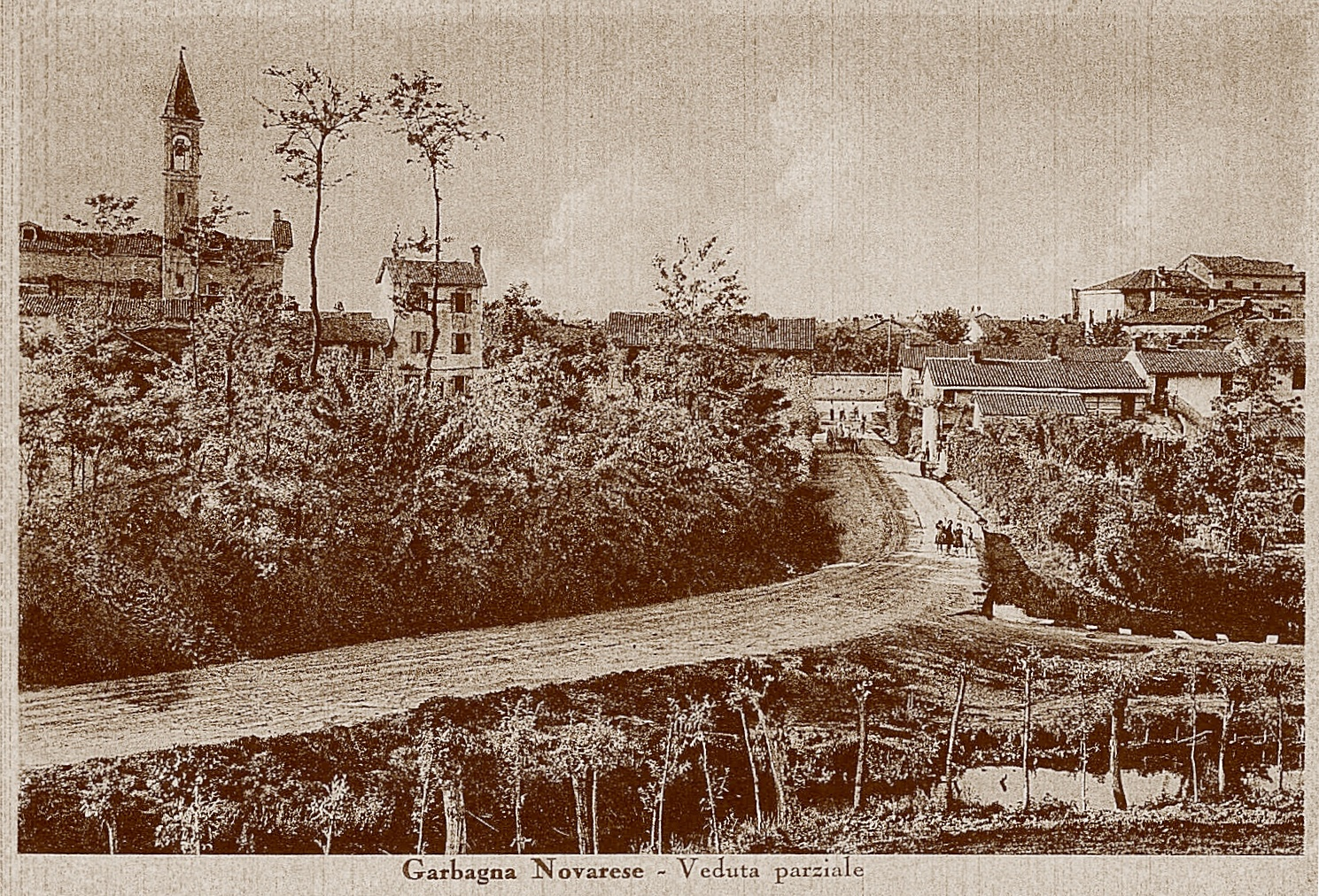
Postcard of the village, before the construction of the new town hall

During the labour turmoil of the Biennio rosso period, various initiatives were launched in the village, both by the Socialist and Catholic groups. On the one hand, in 1920, the Società Cooperativa di Produzione e Lavoro (Cooperative Society of Production and Work), known locally as Circolo, was founded, with headquarters on the corner of what is now Via Matteotti and Via IV Novembre. It became a meeting point for the entire village, frequented by people of all social backgrounds and political opinions. On the other hand, in those years a significant part of the agricultural workers joined the white leagues, organizations belonging to the Catholic trade unionism which proposed themselves as an alternative to the nascent fascism and socialism. These organizations, although less numerous and less organized than their left-wing counterparts, were very strong in several towns in the Novara area such as Pernate, Casalino, Villata and in the area towards Lomellina. The white leagues promoted a program in favor of small property, a topic very dear to many farmers and sharecroppers who aspired to climb the social ladder by becoming small landowners.

The advent of fascism in the Novara area also brought violence to Garbagna, although limited to the two following events:

- in May 1921, during a rally held by Guglielmo Gambarotta from Cerano, former deputy of the Constitutional Democratic Party, two fascists, probably drunk, were disturbing and were asked to stop; when they did not comply with the request, they were beaten and slightly injured; as a result of the affront, the comrades of the unfortunates organised a punitive expedition to Garbagna, during which the workers' club was devastated;
- on 9 July 1922, Angelo Ridoni, head of the fascist squads in that town, was killed in Casalino; that same evening and in the following days, the reaction of the fascist squads in Casalino was seen, Granozzo, Caltignaga and Cavagliano (hamlet of Bellinzago), sometimes supported by the police themselves; this resulted in a protest strike by agricultural workers, which quickly spread throughout the province; in the following days the devastation of workers' clubs by the fascists spread to dozens of towns in the Novara area, including Sozzago, Borgolavezzaro, Terdobbiate, Tornaco and Garbagna itself.

Towards the mid-1920s, the Circolo was converted into a Dopolavoro, directly dependent on the O.N.D. (Opera Nazionale Dopolavoro), and named after Roberto Forni, a Novara farmer from Lomellina, a leading figure of the early Novara fascism (member of Parliament, president of the Major Hospital of Novara, provincial secretary of the Fascist union and brother of Cesare Forni, leader of the Lomellina fascists). The president was Virgilio Buslacchi, former local secretary of the National Fascist Party. Despite the new name, the Circolo remained the meeting point for the entire village.

By order of the Minister of Corporations, on 8 March 1937, Dopolavoro received as a donation all the properties belonging to the Società anonima cooperativa "Produzione e Lavoro Riscatto Proletario" (Cooperative Society "Production and Work for Proletarian Redemption").

In their work on the history of sport in Garbagna, authors Arrigoni, Mambrini, and Ramati offer a detailed account of the passion that ignited the spirits between the two world wars: football. Given the evident passion of many young Garbagnese for the sport, President Buslacchi, along with Pierino Tencaioli, a passionate athlete, created Garbagna's first real football team around 1930. Tencaioli was responsible for training and organizing the first friendly matches against teams from neighbouring towns and neighbourhoods of Novara. The pitch was on private land belonging to the Muttini family, while the team's meeting place remained the Circolo. In discussing this first football adventure, Arrigoni, Mambrini, and Ramati dwell on some details of that sporting experience: travel to away matches consisted of caravans of bicycles, each with two players at a time; the referee could occasionally be a manager or coach of the host team; violence or hatred was never seen in the game, accidents were very rare, and matches always ended with a drink together. Even though it was only the beginning, the team was competitive overall: the many defeats, suffered mainly away from home, were still considered honourable thanks to the few goals that managed to get past the strong defense.

Given the large turnout in the village and the objective validity of the initiative, in 1931 the "Roberto Forni" Sports Society (named after the Dopolavoro itself) was founded, a necessary step to access official competitions. The team was then affiliated with the FIGC/ULIC (Unione Libera Italiana del Calcio) and entered the 2nd division championship.

In the 1931/1932 championship, the team faced the city teams Torrion Quartara, Lumellogno, Sparta, Veveri, and IV Novembre, along with teams from the villages of Sozzaghese, Morghenghese, Vespolate, and Nibbiola. The Lumellogno team won, while Garbagna finished only eighth, making it clear that only half of its players were able to play at a competitive level. The matches in Novara were more popular, but attendance in Garbagna remained satisfactory, always with at least a hundred spectators and sometimes peaking at 300. Given the obvious technical shortcomings, Buslacchi and Tencaioli tried with the foreigners': after evaluating many players during the friendly matches organized for this purpose, six strong players were added to the squad, five from Novara and one from Vespolate. The choice proved to be a winning one: the 1932/1933 championship, played against virtually the same opponents, was won by Torrion Quartara, but the Garbagna team achieved a very creditable third place, supported by an ever-increasing number of spectators. Despite its success, confirmed by the results of the specially organized summer tournament (the Coppa Garbagna 1933), in the autumn of 1933 the team lost numerous players, both local and acquired, and the replacements proved inadequate. Probably due to bitterness over unfair pay, the team ultimately withdrew from the 1933/1934 championship, and the club was closed in early 1934.

That year, the demands of the new provincial secretary of the Fascist Party, Gualtiero Lucchesi, became more pressing toward all Dopolavoro's, continually requesting the organization of sporting events. The president of the Garbagnese Dopolavoro, Buslacchi, received explicit requests, to which he responded by acknowledging the simple reality: since almost all inhabitants were labourers, they had no time for sporting activities, having to provide for their families. The only concrete attempts involved cycling and athletics, but these were never followed up. On the other hand, Buslacchi's attempts to attract participants to the periodic conferences of fascist officials at the Circolo also met with little success: attendance was low, bored, and disrespectful of the fascist etiquette that required the Roman salute. Lucchesi's impositions on the Dopolavoro's also provided a curious anecdote on the occasion of Mussolini's visit to Novara on 18 May 1939: since a real Cycling Battalion of five members was required to parade before the Duce (complete with statute, uniforms, and membership cards), it was created for this purpose two weeks before his arrival. To this day, only three membership cards remain and no record of any particular performances.

There is evidence that several young men from Garbagna took part in the war in Africa, although the documents consulted so far do not report their names or fates.

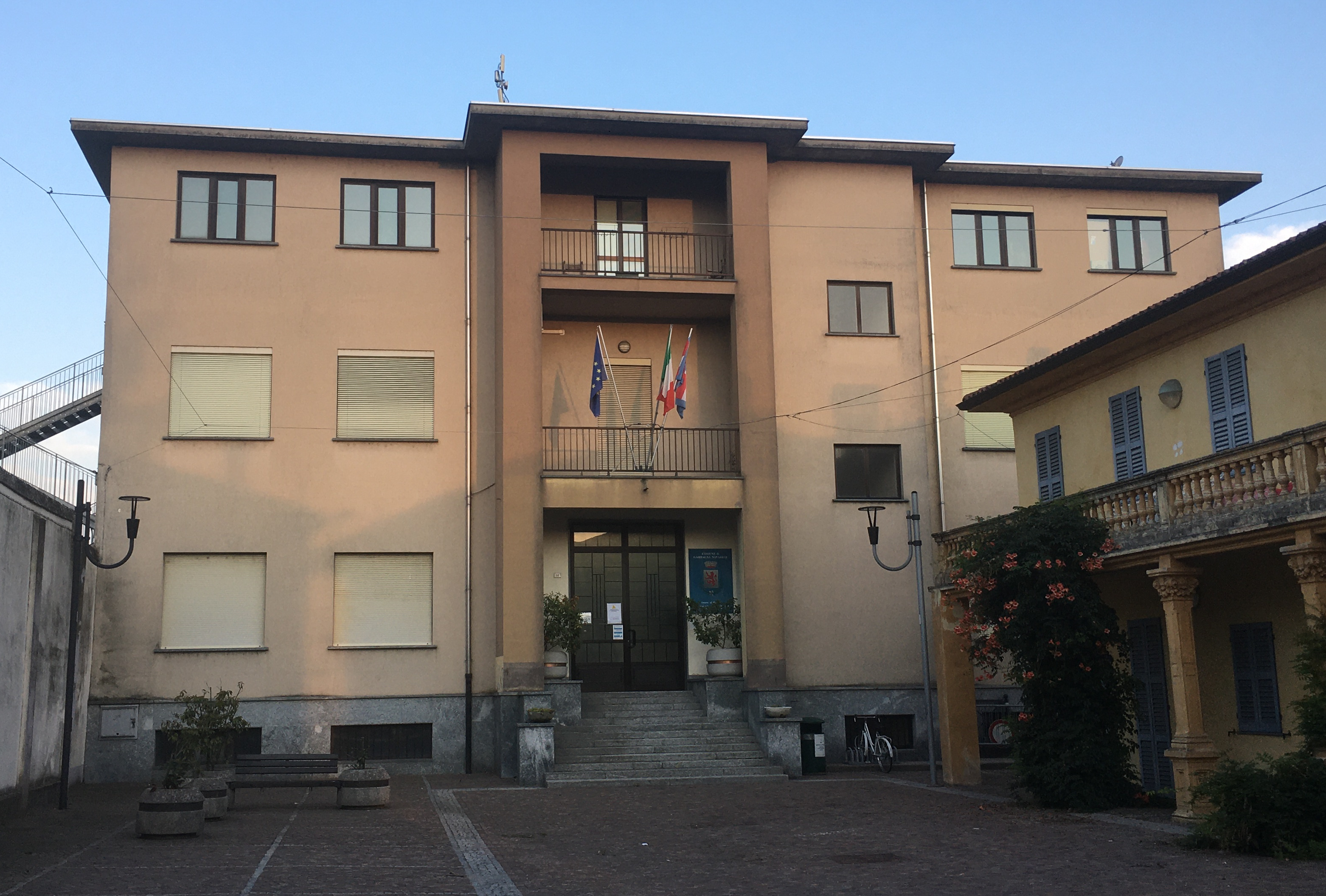
The new town hall, completed in 1939, also houses the primary school

In 1939, on the initiative of the mayor Francesco Magni and designed by Luigi Jacometti, the new town hall in Stile Littorio was completed, shortly before the outbreak of the Second World War. The new building included a section for the primary school.

=== Second World War ===
The sources consulted do not report precise data on the young men who left for military service, but it is known that several took part in the Russian campaign and others were interned in Nazi concentration camps.

As ordered by the O.N.D., during the war, various activities related to daily life in the village were carried out at the Dopolavoro: silkworm and rabbit breeding, the victory garden, and the library. The nursery was also located there, serving the mondine during the weeding season (May and June).

Given the restrictions imposed by the period, sport was naturally ignored for a long time: the football pitch near the mill was ploughed up and used for the cultivation of corn, forcing the boys to play on the farmyard of the Borghetto farmstead.

The destruction brought by the Second World War affected Garbagna only marginally. Frequent air raids caused damage only during the attack on the railway on 17 January 1945, when a squadron of aircraft spotted a train stopped at Garbagna station, flew over it several times, then machine-gunned and bombed it. There were no casualties, as the passengers had time to escape by running through the snow. Some livestock died, having no way to escape. A few days later, on the provincial road near the Moncucco estate, a truck and a farm wagon were targeted by machine-gun fire, setting the former on fire and killing the latter's horse, but the two drivers both managed to save themselves by throwing themselves into the ditches at the side of the road.

Enrico Massara's work on the Italian resistance movement in the Novara area provides a precise picture of what happened instead on the front of the civil war, in the Garbagna area. In April 1944, the Matteotti Brigade was formed in Novara, under the direct command of the provincial C.L.N., divided into three battalions, two of which also operated in the Garbagna area: the 1st Battalion, under the command of Francesco Colombo (Nullo), operated in Novara and its hamlets with 60 men; the 2nd Battalion, under the command of Remigio Gé (Rapido), operated around Nibbiola with 30 men. The two battalions carried out various guerrilla actions, sabotage, liberation of prisoners and theft of weapons and materials, also resorting to infiltration into the ranks of the republicans in order to steal documents and valuable information.

A very high price was paid by the country in August 1944, for a reprisal following sabotage actions carried out in the previous days by the Loss flying brigade (the road and railway bridges over the Cavour canal were blown up). At dawn on the 24th, units of the police headquarters and the Black Brigades forcibly removed thirteen young draft evaders from the Buzzoletto farmstead, imprisoning them in the cells of the Novara Castle. On the morning of the 26th, on the orders of the police commissioner Emilio Pasqualy and the prefect Enrico Vezzalini, the prisoners were led by the squad of commander Vincenzo Martino to the railway bridge of Vignale (hamlet of Novara) and there massacred by deception with bursts of machine-gun fire. The teacher Rina Musso and the doctor Piero Fornara, together with many people from Vignale, took care of the bodies. A plaque was placed at the entrance to the Buzzoletto farmstead during the second anniversary ceremony on 26 August 1945, in memory of what became known as the Vignale massacre. The plaque inscription: To the martyrs of Vignale, innocent victims of tyrannical hatred, so that their bloody name may resound where they lived, an echo of love (the thirteen names and their respective ages at the time of death follow).

In October 1944, as partisan numbers grew, the Matteotti Brigade became the Mario Campagnoli Mobile Brigade (in honor of a comrade who had fallen a few days earlier), and a battalion was added, while the 1st and 2nd increased their ranks to 110 and 60 men, respectively. On February 22, 1945, some fighting took place in which the 2nd Battalion took part in the areas of Olengo, Garbagna, and Nibbiola.

On 25 March 1945, the Garbagna area was the scene of an event that, while not directly involving the village, clearly demonstrated the chaotic atmosphere of the civil war. On 23 March, a Novara policeman had been killed near the Gambarera farmstead, an action that two days later attracted a large number of German troops, supported by the Black Brigades, to Nibbiola for a search. Having reached Gambarera, the Muttinis' home was ransacked, and the family was threatened during a search for the body, which was never found. The Milanese Black Brigades rushed to reinforce them, crossing from nearby Garbagna and hastily approaching the farmhouse. Reaching the aqueduct bridge, they glimpsed armed men crawling from Nibbiola, whom they mistook for partisans, but were in fact the Novara Black Brigades. A firefight ensued for over half an hour, involving the canal guard's house where the Milanese had barricaded themselves, followed by hand-to-hand combat with bladed weapons. Before either side realized their mistake, Luciano Folli, leader of the group from Garbagna and commander of the "Ettore Muti" brigade, lost his life. His body was carried on a cart to the Casa del Fascio in Novara, while the partisans, alert to the danger, had already fled across the countryside.

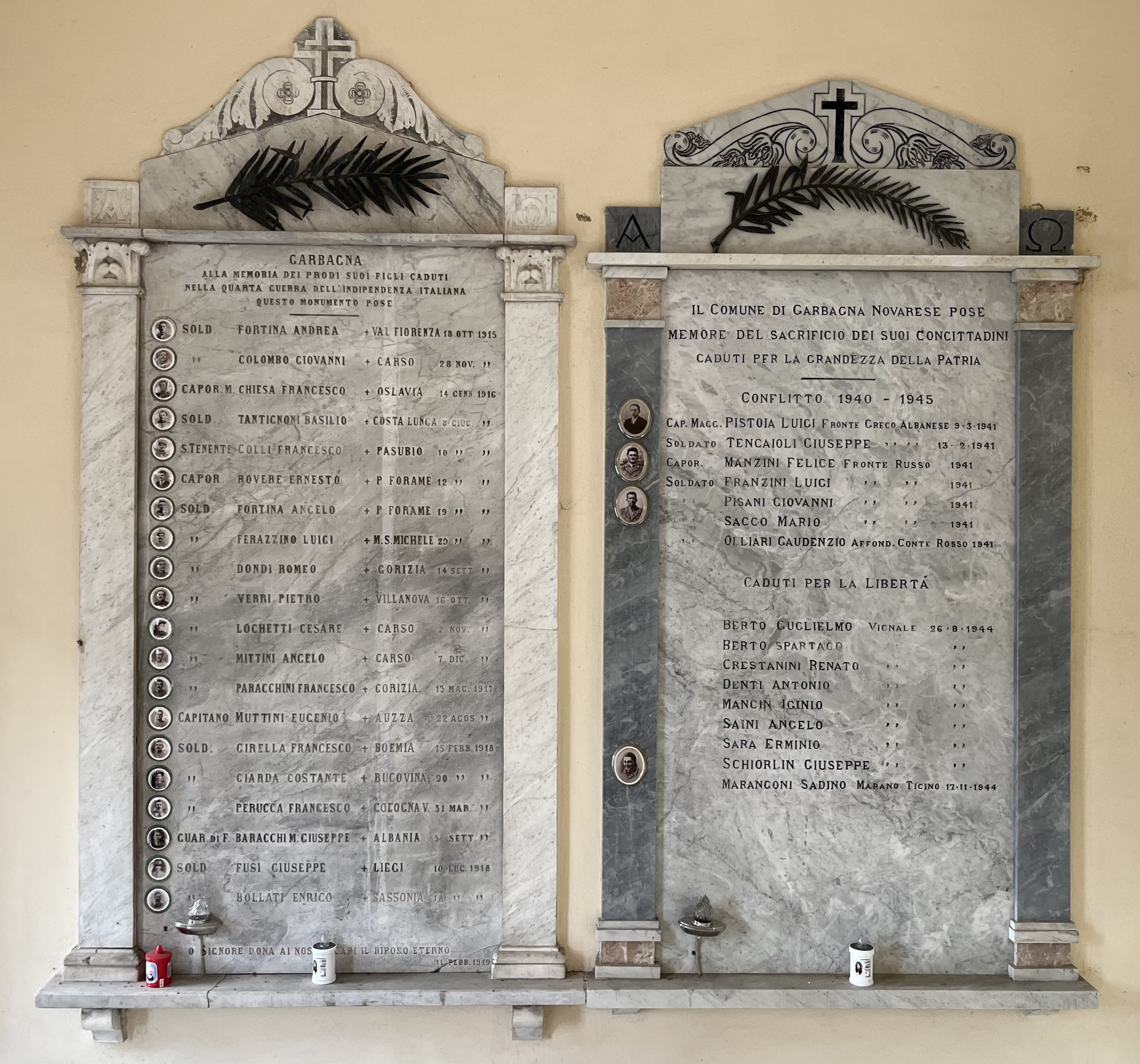
Memorial to the fallen of Garbagna in the two world wars, at the cemetery

Finally, in the frantic hours of 25 April 1945, the 2nd Battalion carried out searches in the area in search of the last groups of resistance, establishing political posts and carrying out order service, assisted in patrolling and managing checkpoints by members of the Pizio Greta Brigade of the 2nd Valsesia Division.

Allied troops marched through the village on the evening of 1 May 1945, cheered by crowds throwing bouquets of flowers and bells ringing in celebration. In the following days, members of the C.L.N. hung a poster in the foyer of the old town hall with photographs of the 13 victims of Vignale, along with the names of two Garbagnese partisans who fell in combat: Livino Marangon and Gian Battista Carelli. The village honoured their memory by laying flowers.

Ten more names must be added to the death toll, many of whom are missing in Russia or dead in Albania.

=== Second post-war period ===
Once the tragedy of the war was over, while the institutional order of the State was being reorganized, the local authorities of Garbagna were provisionally administered by the local branch of the C.L.N. The office of mayor was re-established and entrusted to the carabiniere Felice Pavesi, nephew of the Garbagnese Garibaldi's soldier Pietro Pavesi and brave soldier of the Great War decorated with the War Cross of Military Valor for the operations carried out on Monte Grappa.

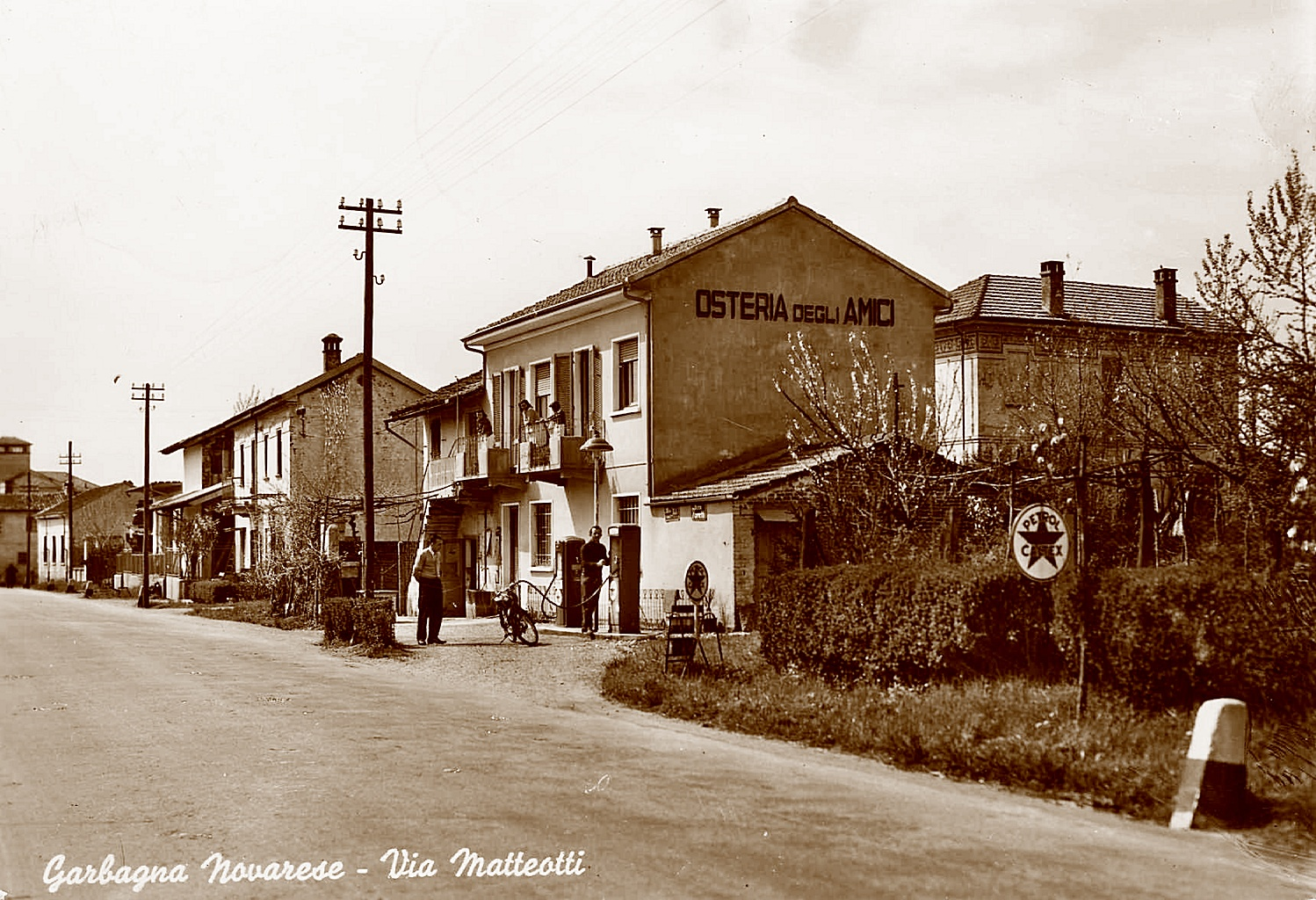
Postcard with the Osteria degli Amici (Friends' tavern), west side of the main road

Dopolavoro was converted into CRAL-ENAL (Circolo Ricreativo Assistenziale dei Lavoratori - Ente Nazionale Assistenza Lavoratori, that is Workers' Recreational Welfare Club - National Workers' Welfare Agency), which elected Gaudenzio Manzini as its new president. Former president Virgilio Buslacchi, whom the population never resented, returned to the village a few months later and immediately resumed his role as vice-president and secretary of the Circolo. Like Buslacchi, former mayor Francesco Magni was never hated in Garbagna.

Football resumed in 1945, with the Circolo still serving as a meeting place. The lack of a pitch was resolved thanks to the helpful connections of some fellow citizens: a plot of land owned by the Monte di Pietà of Novara, located not far from the previous pitch, near the mill, was made available and developed by the young players themselves. Initially, the activity remained outside of official competitions, limited to amateur levels. Yet, many young people joined, eager to play, guided by several members of the pre-war team. Initially, a few internal matches were played, which allowed the future team to be selected. Shortly thereafter, matches were organized with neighbouring towns, which were also reorganizing at the same time. In 1946, at the inauguration match for the new Lumellogno pitch, the team already proved quite competitive, earning a creditable draw. Arrigoni, Mambrini, and Ramati report that the team financed its sporting activities by organizing evenings and parties at the Circolo. Unfortunately, this football experience was short-lived: by late 1947, the group began to disintegrate, fueled by the owners' threat to convert the field to agricultural use (which actually happened the following year).

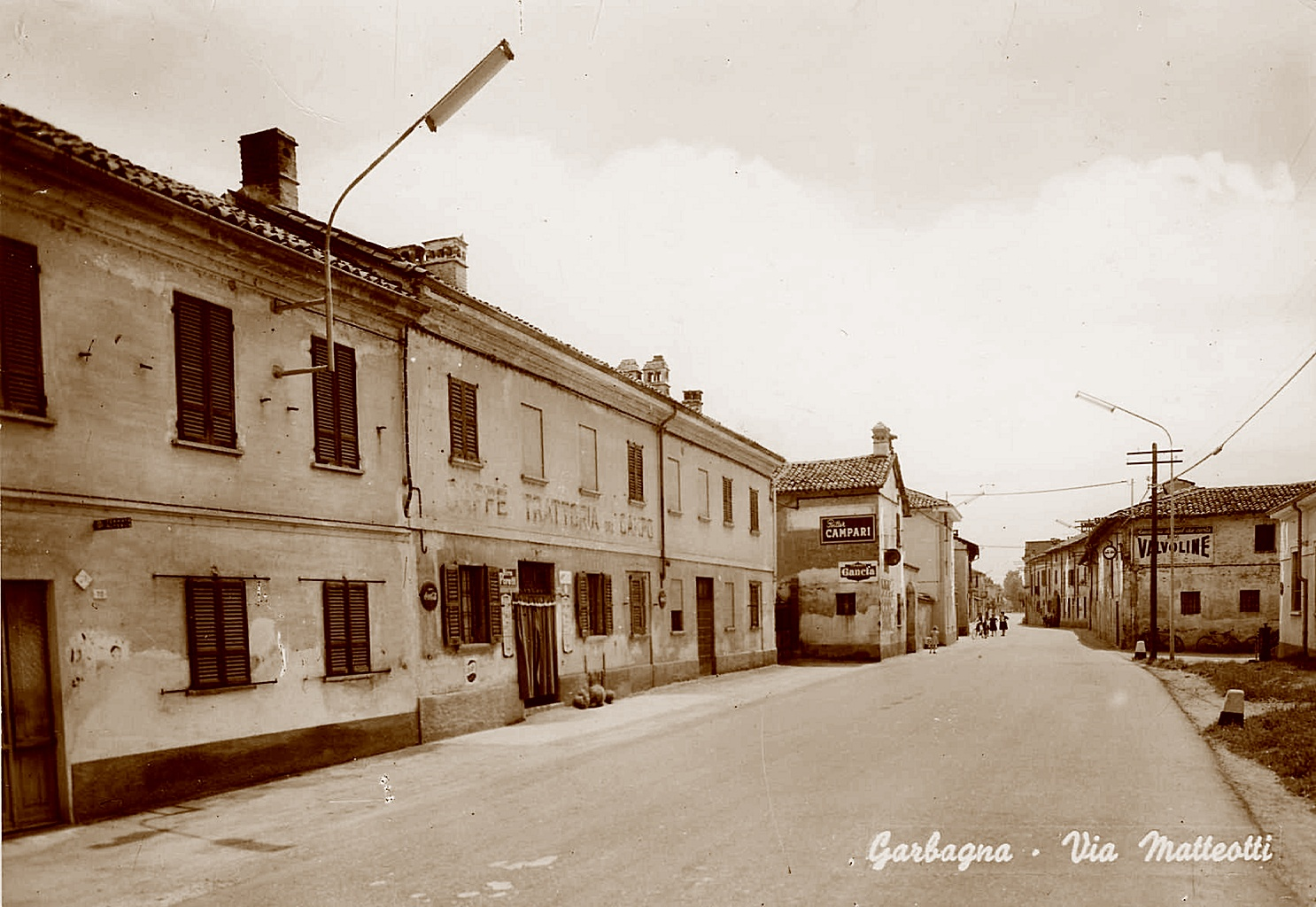
Postcard with Trattoria del campo (Camp restaurant), east side of the main road

Between late 1945 and early 1946, the C.L.N. proposed to the village erecting a war memorial, but a nursery school was preferred: a need that had long been strongly felt, given that at the time only Garbagna, Nibbiola, and Olengo did not have one. The nursery school was located on the first floor of the town hall, while the furnishings were purchased thanks to donations from numerous private individuals, the C.L.N. itself, and the Monte di Pietà of Novara. The inauguration took place on May 19, 1946, with a solemn ceremony coinciding with the arrival of the three pianzoline nuns (Missionary Sisters of the Immaculate Queen of Peace) from Mortara, who were responsible for the education of the children. In the following years, the same nuns took care of, among other things, the moral assistance to the rice weeders, the care of the sick, the embroidery school for the girls of the village, the catechism and the cleaning of the church.

On 2 June 1946, on the occasion of the referendum on the institutional form of the state, out of 726 valid votes, 492 went to the republic (67.77%) and 234 to the monarchy (32.23%). These results are substantially in line with the Province of Novara (63.61% for the republic and 36.39% for the monarchy) while they differ from the Piedmont region (57.11% for the republic and 42.89% for the monarchy).

Map of the municipal territory, since 1953

On 28 October 1953, at the request of the inhabitants themselves and with the approval of the two municipal administrations involved, the Calzavacca estate passed from the municipality of Garbagna to that of Terdobbiate.

Between 1959 and 1960, at the suggestion of Attilio Colli, a farmer at the Buzzoletto Vecchio farmstead, the Ente Nazionale Risi (National Rice Board) built the new nursery school, designed by architect Gaetano Zerbi. The building was constructed on the village's main street, on land previously used as a vegetable garden, with an entrance from the road leading to the parish church. Responsibility for the children's education remained with the pianzoline nuns of the previous nursery school, while the administration was entrusted to a specially elected local committee. This provided Ernesto Colli, parish priest of nearby Nibbiola, with a solution to the problem of the lack of a nursery school that was also plaguing his village in those years. With decree no. 20 of 12 January 1964, the President of the Republic elevated the institution to a moral entity (corresponding to today's juridical person). We know that in 1972 the administrative committee included, among others, Attilio Colli himself, the parish priest Don Luigi Stasioli, and the village doctor Giacomo Perolini. The institution was supported by the charity of public bodies and the population, for example through the special charity raffle held during the village's September festival.

Together with Borgolavezzaro, in the post-war period Garbagna was the village in the Lower Novarese area that saw the greatest industrialisation. Between 1969 and 1974, the birth of various industries allowed the abandonment of the purely agricultural economy that had always characterized it, thanks to the creation of hundreds of new jobs, to the advantage of both Garbagna itself and the neighbouring towns. In 1969 the material testing machine company Metro-Com Engineering was founded by Oscar Comazzi of Novara, on a piece of land not far from the Moncucco estate, near the main road. In the early 1970s, several industries quickly sprung up near the village, both toward Nibbiola and Novara. The following businesses settled toward Nibbiola: the Caffè-Crem coffee roasting company, which traded throughout Italy and was owned by the widow Magni (who married Crolla, hence the name Magni-Crolla); the Confezioni Magi shirt factory, which employed around fifty women and also offered items for brides and children; and a marble and granite workshop. The S.I.D.A. men's clothing factory, located toward Novara, opened on land near Moncucco previously owned by the Monte di Pietà. The company's president was Giovanni Scolari, with the owners Marzotto, Gallo, Farina, and Chiesa, which also offered home-based work; and the A.DI.MAR. knitwear factory by Angelo Di Martino, on land belonging to the Pollastro family on the side of the main road bordering Olengo.

Like other towns in the Lower Novarese, such as Tornaco, Borgolavezzaro, Cerano, and Terdobbiate, industrialization halted the depopulation of Garbagna, thanks to the small but steady influx of new residents from both surrounding towns and Novara, and of a form of commuting among the new workers. The municipal administration, led by the young mayor Mario Costadone, invested heavily in public works that further encouraged new settlements: strengthening the sewer system, expanding the aqueduct by digging a new well, and building new housing along the main road, both in the form of condominiums and individual villas. The population increase also led to urbanization of areas that were previously wooded or dedicated to cultivation, respectively the hills towards the Arbogna valley and the area of the road that leads to the oratorio di Santa Maria

In 1980 the main economic activities were agriculture (rice, corn, wheat and fodder), livestock farming, mechanical manufacturing (6 companies with almost 40 employees) and trade (more than 20 businesses with approximately 40 employees).

== 2000s ==
In May 2019, following the failure to submit lists for the renewal of the mayor and the municipal council, Garbagna was placed under special administration until September 2020, the month in which the subsequent elections were held with two candidate lists, which saw the victory of Fabiano Trevisan.

With a view to reviving the memory of the history of rice growing and the role of the rice weeders, the twinning agreement with the municipalities of Trino Vercellese and Rio Saliceto (Reggio Emilia) was established on 18 May 2024. The three towns share the phenomenon of seasonal transfers of female workers from Emilia (Rio Saliceto as their origin, Garbagna and Trino as their destination), who annually left their hometowns to be employed in the Piedmont rice fields.

== Transport and telecommunications history ==
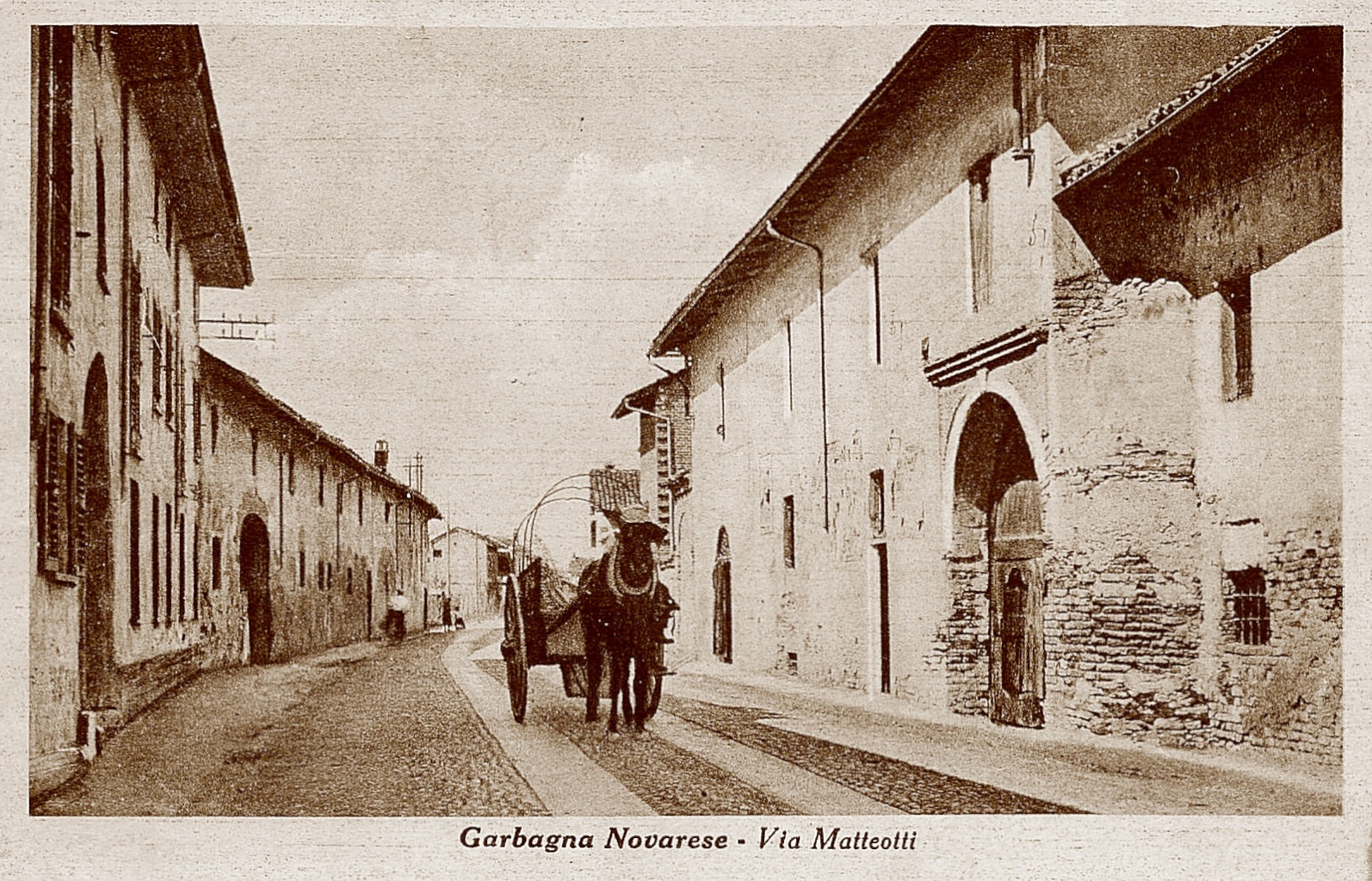
Vintage postcard, with main street paved with cobblestones

- 1794: the main road of the village is paved with cobblestone for the first time
- 1836: granite sidewalks are added to the main street of the village and the cobblestone pavement is redone
- 1849: establishment of the post office
- 1851: the village is reached by the new railway line Novara-Alessandria, with a level crossing at the oratorio di Santa Maria, but it does not yet have a station
- 1862: the railway stop is requested from the railway authority
- 24 November 1884: the railway stop is activated
- 1 July 1896: the telegraphic office is established
- 2 April 1909: the second track of the railway line is activated
- 14 December 1912: the Italian Parliament approves the request for connection to the telephone network
- December 2009: given the unavailability of Telecom Italia to activate the broadband via ADSL technology (Garbagna is part of the 4% of uncovered Piedmont territory, despite the municipality's inclusion in the Reduce Digital Divide program, within the Wi-Pie initiative of the Piedmont Region), the municipal administration invites citizens to opt for solutions based on Wireless technology
- Autumn 2023: broadband Internet connection is available via optical fiber (FTTH)

Sources are conflicting in temporally placing the construction of the main road of the village, known as Lomellina state road 211.

== Bibliography ==
=== Main sources ===
Being a small rural village that was predominantly agricultural for centuries, the dedicated works are limited:

- the works of Lino Cassani (canon of the Novara Cathedral) and Ernesto Colli (parish priest of the nearby Nibbiola), both members of the Società Storica Novarese, are based on documents from the archives of the religious institutions of Novara and the local administration, constituting the main sources for Garbagna to date:
  - Cassani, Lino; Colli, Ernesto (1948). Memorie storiche di Garbagna Novarese [Historical memories of Garbagna Novarese] (in Italian). Novara: Tip. Pietro Riva & C – via Foto Emilio Alzati.
  - Colli, Ernesto (1978). Garbagna, Nibbiola, Vespolate, Borgolavezzaro - Le mie memorie [Garbagna, Nibbiola, Vespolate, Borgolavezzaro - My memories] (in Italian). Novara: Tip. San Gaudenzio – via Foto Emilio Alzati.
- an in-depth historical and artistic study of the 15th century is offered in Franca Franzosi's thesis aobut the Oratorio di Santa Maria (1986):
  - Franzosi, Franca (1986). Un episodio della cultura figurativa novarese: Santa Maria di Garbagna e i suoi affreschi quattrocenteschi [An episode of Novara figurative culture: Santa Maria of Garbagna and its fifteenth‑century frescoes] (Thesis) (in Italian). Maria Luisa Gatti Perer and Franco Mazzini (supervisors). Milan: Università Cattolica del Sacro Cuore di Milano – via Comune di Garbagna Novarese.
- the events of the 20th century, from the 1930s to the 1980s, are described in the work of Enrico Arrigoni, Gabrio Mambrini and Silvano Ramati from 1989, seen from the sporting activity perspective:
  - Arrigoni, Enrico; Mambrini, Gabrio; Ramati, Silvano (1989). Oltre mezzo secolo di sport e di passione calcistica a Garbagna [Over half a century of sport and football passion in Garbagna] (in Italian). Illustrated by Rosella Marchetti, patronage by municipality of Garbagna Novarese. Novara: Istituto Geografico De Agostini.

=== Other sources ===
However, given the proximity to Novara, the context of the macro-historical events can be derived from the history of the provincial capital and the Lower Novara area:

- Garone, Giuseppe (1865). I reggitori di Novara [The rulers of Novara] (in Italian). Novara: Francesco Merati – via Google Books.
- Rizzi, Amleto (1955). Compendio di storia novarese [Compendium of Novara history]. Cronistoria novarese (in Italian). Novara: Provera.
- Keller, Hagen (1–7 September 1974). Origine sociale e formazione del clero cattedrale dei secoli XI e XII nella Germania e nell'Italia settentrionale [Social origin and formation of the cathedral clergy of the 11th and 12th centuries in Germany and Northern Italy] (PDF). Le istituzioni ecclesiastiche della "Societas Christiana" dei secoli XI-XII. Diocesi, pievi e parrocchie. Atti della sesta Settimana internazionale di studio (in Italian). Milan: Vita e pensiero.
- Massara, Enrico (1984). Antologia dell'antifascismo e della resistenza novarese: uomini ed episodi della lotta di liberazione [An anthology of Anti-Fascism and the Novara Resistance: men and episodes of the liberation struggle] (in Italian). Foreword by Angelo Del Boca. Novara: Grafica Novarese. OCLC 491054840. The website of the Novara section of the National Association of Italian Partisans (ANPI) reports the text of the two chapters cited from this work:
  - "La resistenza al fascismo nel Basso Novarese 9-11 luglio 1922 - Casalino 9 luglio 1922" [Resistance to Fascism in the Lower Novarese area, July 9–11, 1922 - Casalino, July 9, 1922]. ANPI Novara (in Italian).
  - "Rappresaglia della squadraccia - Novara-Vignale, 26 Agosto 1944" [Reprisal by the thugs - Novara-Vignale, August 26, 1944]. ANPI Novara (in Italian).
- Mongiat, Emiliana; Radice, Bruno, eds. (1993). Il Basso Novarese [The Low Novarese]. Percorsi - Storia e documenti artistici del Novarese (in Italian). Novara: Province of Novara.
- Montanari, Mirella, ed. (2003) [2002]. L'età medievale (secoli VI-XV) [The Middle Ages (6th-15th centuries)]. Una terra tra due fiumi, la provincia di Novara nella storia (in Italian) (2 ed.). Novara: Province of Novara.
- Monferrini, Sergio, ed. (2003). L'età moderna (secoli XV-XVIII) [The modern age (15th-18th centuries)]. Una terra tra due fiumi, la provincia di Novara nella storia (in Italian). Novara: Province of Novara.
- Tuniz, Dorino, ed. (2007). L'Ottocento [The nineteenth century]. Una terra tra due fiumi, la provincia di Novara nella storia (in Italian). Novara: Province of Novara.
- Paolo Carrega; Luciana Ziruolo; Mario Renosio; Nicoletta Fasano; Michele Calandri; Antonella Braga; Pier Antonio Ragozza; Nicola Adduci; Barbara Berruti; Andrea D'Arrigo; Bruno Maida; Riccardo Marchis; Enrico Miletto; Daniela Muraca; Stefano Musso; Alberto Lovatto; Enrico Pagano; Corrado Borsa (2015). Dellavalle, Claudio (ed.). Il Piemonte nella guerra e nella Resistenza: la società civile (1942-1945) [Piedmont during the war and the Resistance: civil society (1942-1945)] (PDF) (in Italian). Edited by Chiara Colombini, prepared on behalf of the Piedmont Regional Council and the Resistance and Constitution Committee.
- Chiara, Pier Angelo (2020) [2010]. Breve storia del Piemonte dai Celto-Liguri allo Stato Sabaudo [A brief history of Piedmont from the Celt-Ligurians to the Savoy State] (in Italian) (3 ed.). Turin: Graphot.
- Tuniz, Dorino (2020). "La Bassa novarese. Assetti storici e politici delle terre a sud di Novara". Pellegrini in terra novarese - Un'antologia di testi di Dorino Tuniz [Pilgrims in the Novara area - An anthology of texts by Dorino Tuniz]. Novarien. (in Italian). Novara: Interlinea. ISSN 0078-253X.
- Giani, Silvia (2021). La storia di Novara - Dalla preistoria ai giorni nostri [History of Novara - From prehistory to the present day]. CommunityBook - La Storia d'Italia (in Italian). Vol. 3/2021. Rome: Typimedia. ISBN 978-88-3626-029-4. ISSN 2704-9744 – via IDocPub.

== See also ==
- Garbagna Novarese farmsteads
