= Vertamocorii =

Vertamocorri may refer to:

- Vertamocorii (Cisalpina), a Celtic people from modern Novara (Piedmont, Italy)
- Vertamocorii (Narbonensis), a Celtic people from the Vercors region (France)
