= Agogna =

River in Italy

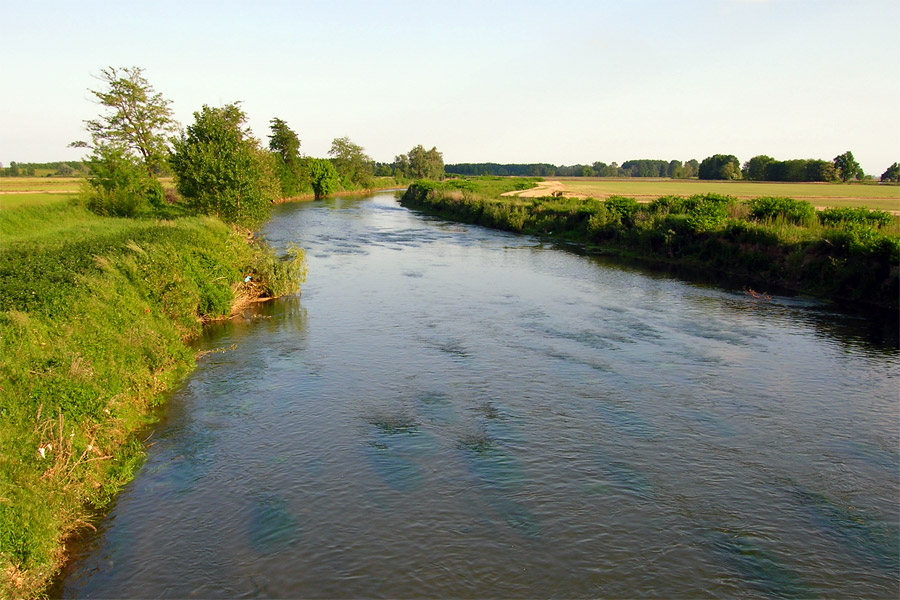
- Near Novara

Location
- Country: Italy

Physical characteristics
- Source
  - location: Monte Mottarone
  - elevation: about 1,000 m (3,300 ft)
- Mouth: Po
  - coordinates: 45.0661°N 8.9102°E
- Length: 140 km (87 mi)
- Basin size: 995 km^{2} (384 sq mi)
- Discharge
  - average: 21.9 m^{3}/s (770 cu ft/s)

Basin features
- Progression: Po→ Adriatic Sea
- Tributaries
  - left: Erbognone

The Agogna (in Piedmontese Agògna) is a 140-kilometre (87 mi) stream which runs through the Italian regions of Piedmont and Lombardy. It is a left side tributary of the river Po.

== Course ==
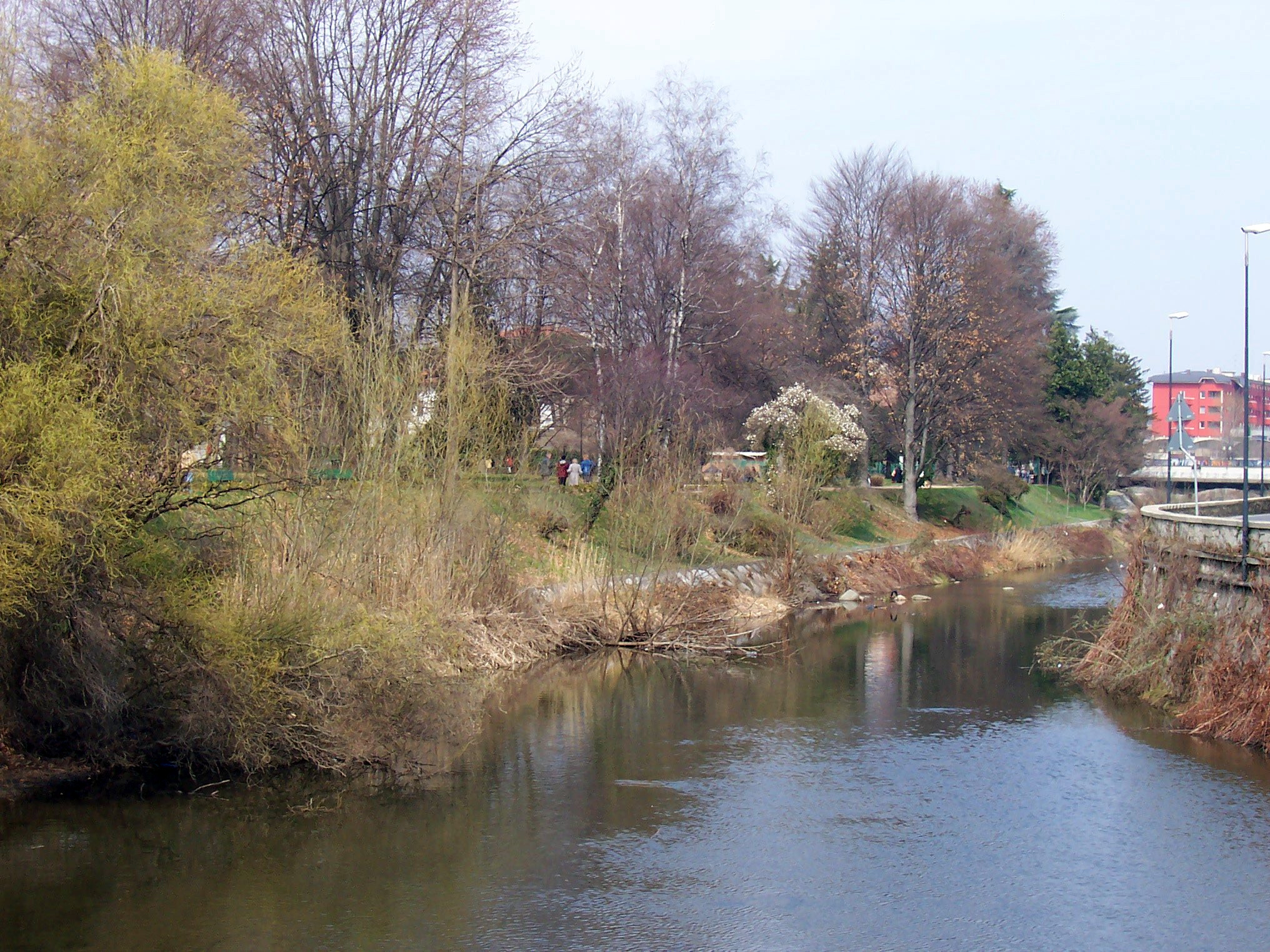
Near Borgomanero

The river's origin is in the area between Lake Orta and Lake Maggiore in the province of Verbano-Cusio-Ossola. It then flows south into the province of Novara and flows past Borgomanero and Cureggio before being joined by a branch of the Terdoppio. The river continues to flow south past Caltignaga and Novara. The river then crosses into the province of Pavia and into the Lomellina area (in the communes of Castello d'Agogna and Lomello) and receives its left tributary, the Erbognone. Finally, the river flows into the Po at Balossa Bigli, part of the comune of Mezzana Bigli, which is near the border between the province of Pavia and the province of Alessandria.

During the Napoleonic conquest of Italy, the Agogna gave its name to a department of the Kingdom of Italy with Novara as capital (See: Novara).
