= Erbognone =

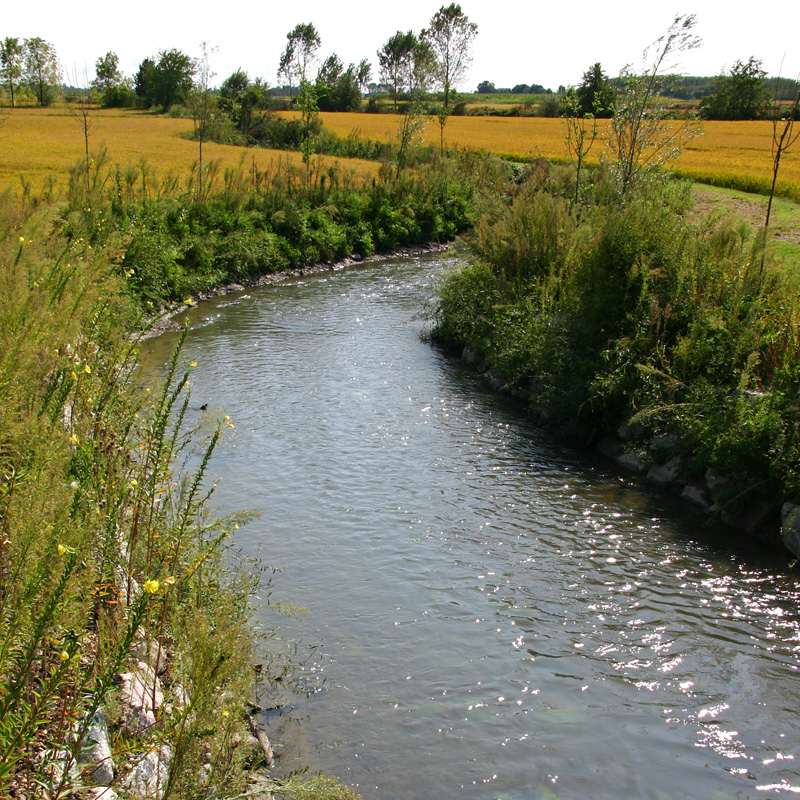

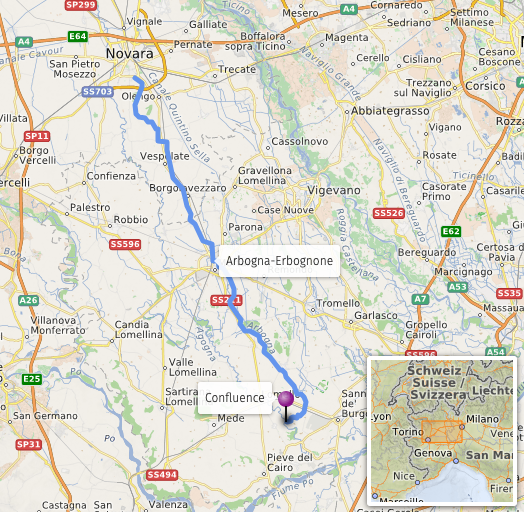

Location
- Country: Italy

Physical characteristics
- Source
  - location: south of Novara
- Mouth: Agogna
  - coordinates: 45.1013°N 8.8352°E

Basin features
- Progression: Agogna→ Po→ Adriatic Sea

The Erbognone (also: Arbogna) is an Italian stream whose sources are south of Novara in the province of Novara.

== Course ==
The stream has its source near Novara; with the name Arbogna flows south past Vespolate and Borgolavezzaro before crossing into the province of Pavia. The river then flows past Mortara and enters the Agogna beyond the point where the Agogna flows past Lomello. A branch of a canal that also flows into the Terdoppio enters the Erbognone after it flows past Mortara. The stream flows mostly in a southward direction (now changes its name to Erbognone) and is roughly parallel to the Agogna until it bends and enters the Agogna.
