= Vertamocorii (Cisalpina) =

Gallic tribe

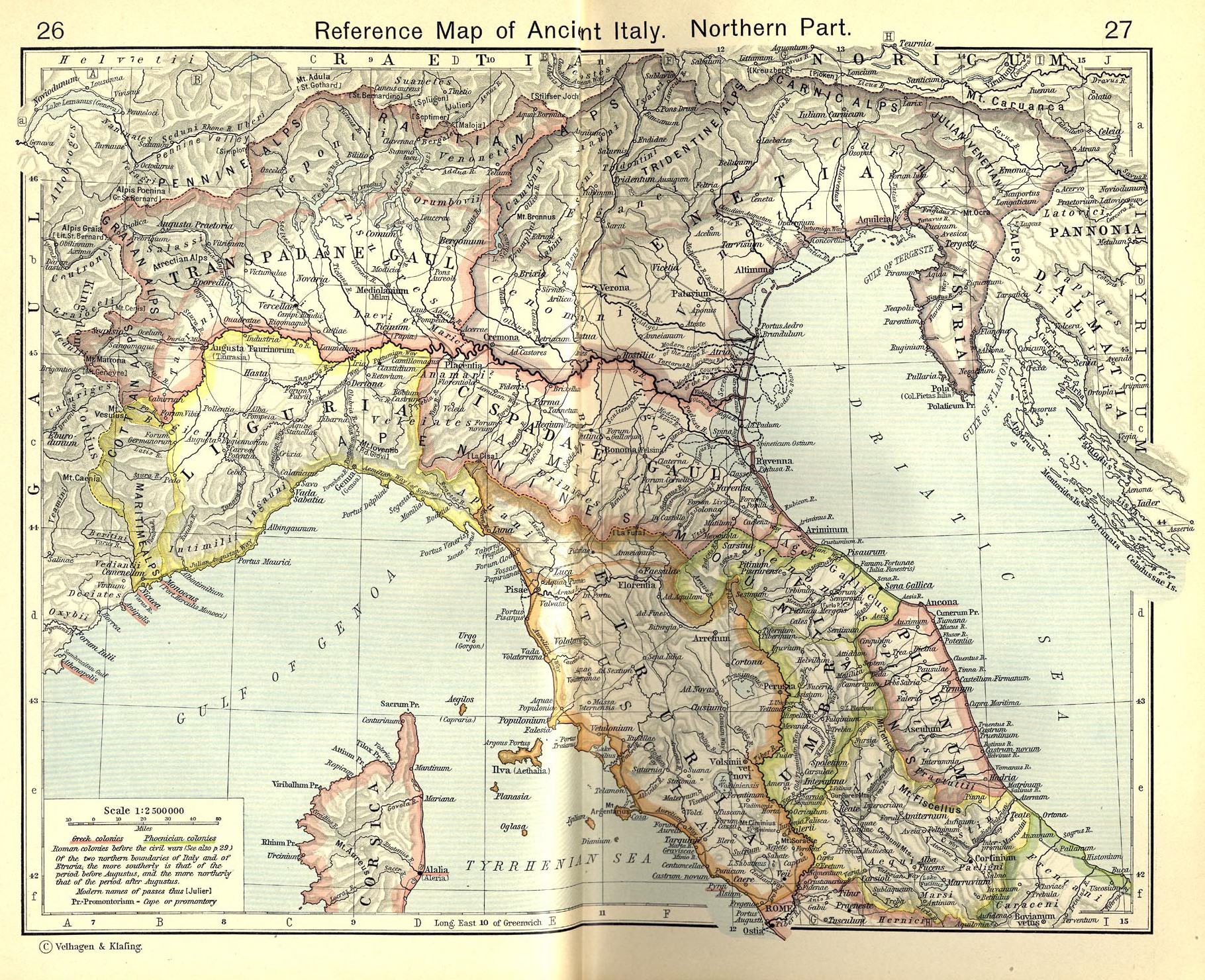
Map with location of Cisalpine Gaul.

The Vertamocorii (Gaulish: *Uertamocorī) were a Celtic people that lived in Cisalpine Gaul around Novara, in Eastern Piedmont (Italy).

== Name ==
The Gaulish ethnonym Vertamo-corii is generally translated as 'those with the superior host' or 'the excellent troops', from uertamos ('superior; summit') attached to corios ('army'). Alternately, it could mean 'troops from the summit'.

== History ==
According to Cato, the Vertamocorii who founded Novara were Ligurians, a view rejected by Pliny (1st c. AD), who classifies them as Gauls.

Novara (founded) by the Vertamocorii, that are from the Vocontii, and not, as believed Cato, Ligurians, ...

== See also ==
- Ancient peoples of Italy
