= Garbagna Novarese farmsteads =

Location of farmsteads on the municipal territory

Given the predominantly rural nature of the village Garbagna Novarese until the first half of the 20th century, its territory is dotted with farmsteads, economy nerve centers that arose throughout its history. This feature is evident throughout the entire Lower Novarese.

The farmsteads located outside the town were considered in the past to be actual hamlets of the municipality, while today (2024) they are indicated as simple agglomerations by the municipal statute. They are Marijna, Belvedere, Brusattina, Moncucco, Buzzoletto Nuovo, Buzzoletto Vecchio and Cascinetta. The only farmstead inside the town centre is Borghetto.

The Novara scholar Angelo Luigi Stoppa, going through the history of Lower Novarese, sees in farmsteads the same historical and artistic relevance of ricetti (small fortified areas used in villages for storing agricultural products, livestock, and working tools), churches and devotional oratories, both in the case of spontaneous and studied architecture. He is also sure the oldest farmsteads, developed around courtyards, evolved directly from ancient Roman rustic villas. From an artistic point of view, finally, he states that the central buildings of some farmsteads (including Moncucco, Buzzoletto Vecchio and Buzzoletto Nuovo) feature such architectural nobility that they are comparable to the much more famous Venetian villas, making their preservation as necessary as the latter.

== History ==
=== Until the 11th century ===
Until the 11th century, the Novara area was covered in woodland vegetation, like much of the Po Valley, and marked by countless watercourses and ponds fed by the springs. The few cultivated areas were gathered around the villages and organized since the Carolingian age in mansi, smallholdings of a few hectares cultivated by individual families of small landowners (free allodiaries) according to a logic of mere survival. The main crops were cereals and vines, together with dry meadows and woods.

At that time Garbagna was located near the oratorio di Santa Maria, built in those years, which served as the parish church; near the Arbogna and the chiesa di San Michele was instead the smaller village of Garbaniola, more recent. A significant portion of the lands belonged to the religious authorities of Novara, following numerous donations made by both Frankish rulers and local landowners in the previous centuries.

=== 12th century ===
Earlier than the rest of the Po Valley, the situation in Novara area changed in the 12th century. With the digging of irrigation ditches and the introduction of water-meadows, fodder production increased exponentially, triggering in turn a radical change in the economy: the small businesses based on mansi could not hold up and disappeared, replaced by farmsteads, vast properties of many tens of hectares in the hands of a few rich landowners who gave work to numerous families of wage earners, extensively cultivated cereals but above all fodder for livestock farming. The latter, no longer based on transhumance due to the availability of fodder all year round (thanks to the water-meadows) and therefore more profitable, became the main activity, driven in turn by the artisan activities of leather processing, for which Novara was renowned.

Already in the first half of the 12th century Garbagna was the affected of these changes: we know of casine (or cassine, that are farmsteads) in its territory, whose water-meadows (wet meadows) were irrigated by recently built ditches, in turn fed by artesian springs. A more precise idea of the size of these new production units is provided by a document of 1181, which reports a small house belonging to the Charity Hospital of Novara with lands that extended from the village of Sant'Agabio to Olengo and Garbagna, lands not by chance rich in irrigation ditches and springs.

Concurrently with the aforementioned evolution of the economic framework, the birth of the Commune of Novara caused changes in the political management of the lands around the city: the Commune extended its influence in the countryside, through the reappropriation of the episcopal fiefs. In this context we can place the infeudation of Garbagna to the aristocratic Novara families Da Muro, Cavallazzi and Del Placido, who, in order to protect the territory from the interference of the canons of the Novara Cathedral promoted the development of the village of Garbaniola, which grew and prospered near the castle and eventually acquired the name Garbagna, to the detriment of the original settlement near the oratorio di Santa Maria which was abandoned over time.

=== 14th century ===
At the beginning of the 14th century, a third player joined the Commune and the episcopate of Novara in the race for Garbagna possession: between 1317 and 1321 the canon of the Cathedral Eleuterio Cattaneo donated 5000 pertiche of land in Garbagna (among others) to the Charity Hospital of Novara, making the institution de facto autonomous and first in importance among all the city hospitals. The presence of the hospital has contributed decisively to the historical and artistic studies on Garbagna, as its archive is rich in details on the population of tenant farmers and workers of its lands, including the farmsteads.

Over time, economic evolution transformed some farmsteads into important settlements: in 1347 Buzzoletto and Moncucco were administered by a dominus (lord).

=== 15th century ===
In the second half of the 15th century, during the period of stability and consequent prosperity under the House of Sforza rule of the Duchy of Milan, devotional art had a great development in the Novara area. In this context Buzzoletto and Moncucco participated in the decoration of the Oratorio di Santa Maria, the main religious centre of the area. The details of the clients present on the works shed light on life and society in the farmhouses at that time: the decorations were commissioned by the tenant farmers themselves, belonging to non-noble families, both local and native, who had made their fortune through livestock farming and agriculture. Their economic availability is demonstrated by the choice of Tommaso Cagnola's workshop, one of the most renowned and sought after in those years.

=== 16th century ===
The land modification for agricultural purposes had a strong acceleration in the 16th century: having the Sforzas introduced rice cultivation in Vigevano area at the end of the 15th century, building vast hydraulic works for this purpose, in the following decades the practice spread to the neighbouring lands of the Duchy of Milan, including Lower Novarese, where vast terraces and artificial canals were created. All this was possible because of the large property presence, the only one capable of sustaining the required investment for the new crop.

=== 20th century ===
At the beginning of the 20th century, a significant part of the modest industrial fabric of Garbagna was located in the farmsteads, where the owners carried out the polishing of their own rice: Brustia in Moncucco, Ferraris in Marijna, Pollini and Soldani in Buzzoletto.

Since the mid-20th century, there has been a general depopulation of farms, as technological progress has reduced the demand for manpower (primarily labourers and rice weeders) and the need for the farmers themselves to reside there, resulting in significant transfers towards inhabited centres.

In 1981, however, the Novara scholar Angelo Luigi Stoppa noted how technological progress was at the same time producing opposite effects: the connection to the electricity and telephone networks. (Note: A detail on the connection of Garbagna farmsteads to the telephone network: in 1961, thanks to the efforts of Oscar Luigi Scalfaro and Giulio Pastore, the then Minister of Posts and Telecommunications Lorenzo Spallino approved the public telephone service activation in several areas around Novara, including Buzzoletto Vecchio and Nuovo, with costs paid by the State; the works were carried out the following year.) It was making even the most isolated farmsteads much less inconvenient than in the past, and therefore more desirable as residences. Stoppa observed their slow repopulation, in some cases even simply as country residences.

=== 21st century ===
Despite Stoppa's considerations in 1981, the differences in habitability between the farms of Garbagna and the town center persisted for decades: as of 2013, the farmsteads located outside the town were still not reached by the methane distribution network, forcing the municipal administration to make up for the lack by offering residents favorable conditions for the use of alternative fuels such as diesel and LPG.

== Ancient farmsteads ==
The two oldest farmsteads, Buzzoletto Vecchio and Moncucco, are also the largest and had been autonomous municipalities for centuries, before being aggregated as hamlets to Garbagna.

=== Buzzoletto Vecchio ===
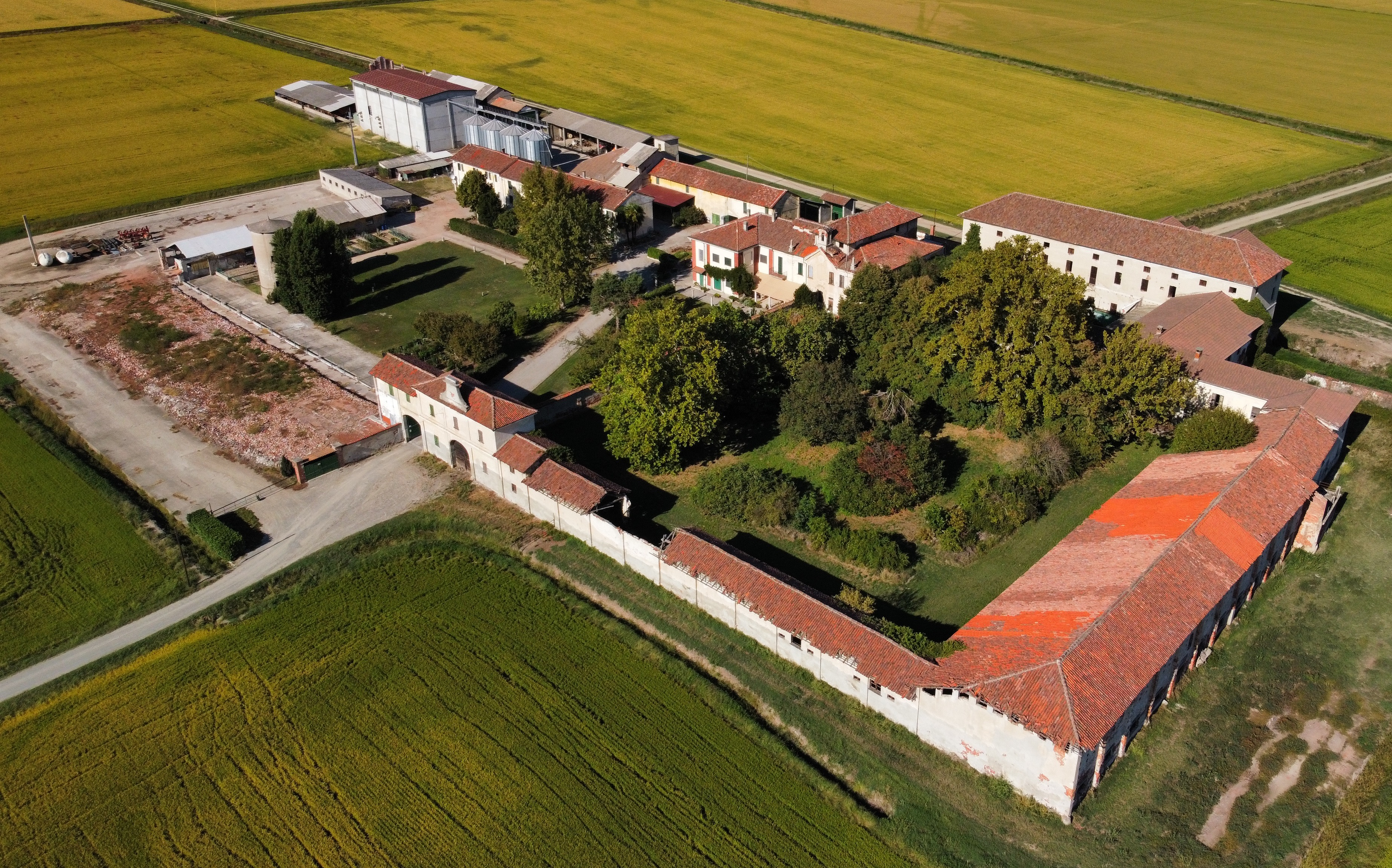
Buzzoletto Vecchio seen from south-west (2022)

The farmstead is on the road that connects Olengo to Terdobbiate and is bordered by the spring of the same name (fontanone di Buzzoletto). A few dozen meters away are the Quintino Sella Canal to the west, the Gambalotta spring to the east, and the Buzzoletto Nuovo farmstead to the north.

Alternative spellings of the name (which means Old Buzzoletto) are Bozzoletto, Buzzoleto, Bussoletto and Bussoleto.

==== History ====
===== Middle ages =====
The Consignationes of 1347 contain several references to an area called Bozoletum or Bozola in the Olengo district, divided among various owners. The benefices of the Novara ecclesiastical institutions included eight plots of land, for a total area of 15 hectares: three pieces of the monastery of San Domenico (later became the monastery of Sant'Agnese, today the local headquarters of the Procura della Repubblica) two of the church of All Saints, one of the church of San Silvestro, two of the churches of San Nazzaro and San Martino of Novara and Sant'Andrea of Olengo.

Over the course of a century it became a notable settlement, resulting in it being entrusted to a dominus (lord).

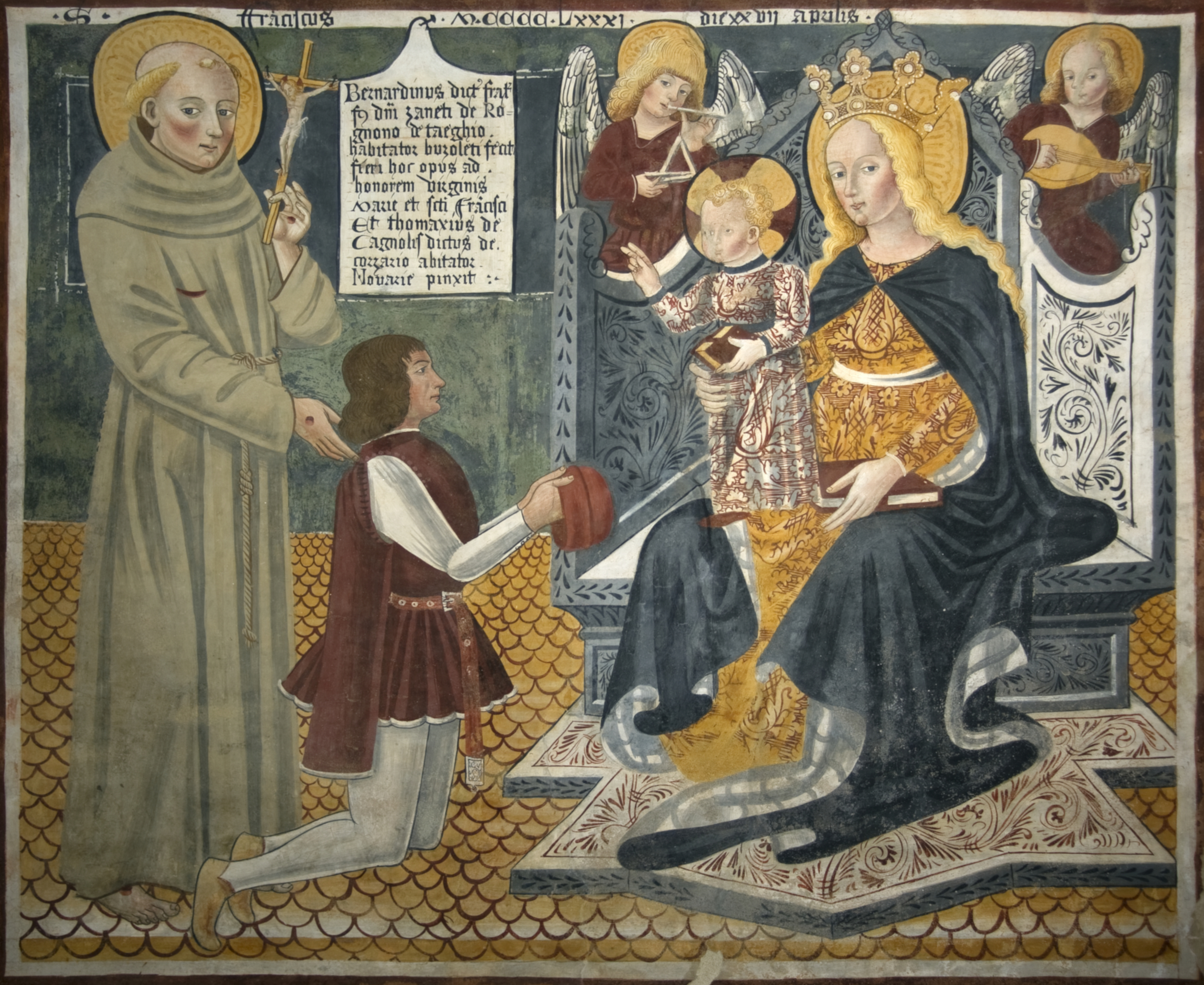
Madonna and Child, two angels and Saint Francis presenting the patron, fresco at Oratorio di Santa Maria commissioned by Bernardino Rognoni from Buzzoletto (1481)

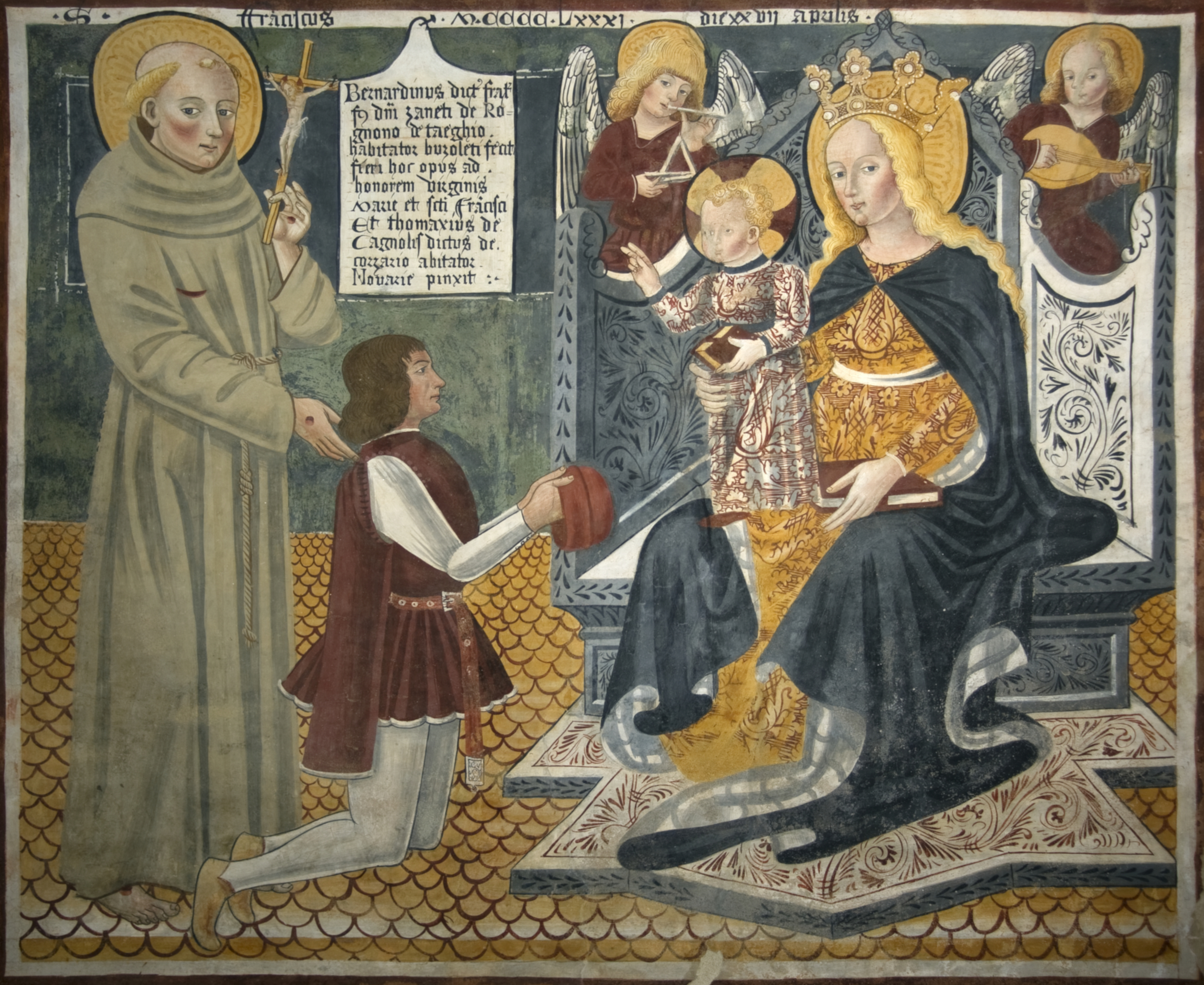
Detail identifying the patron: Bernardinus dictus frater filius quondam domini zaneti de Rognono de taeghio habitator buzoleti fecit fieri […]
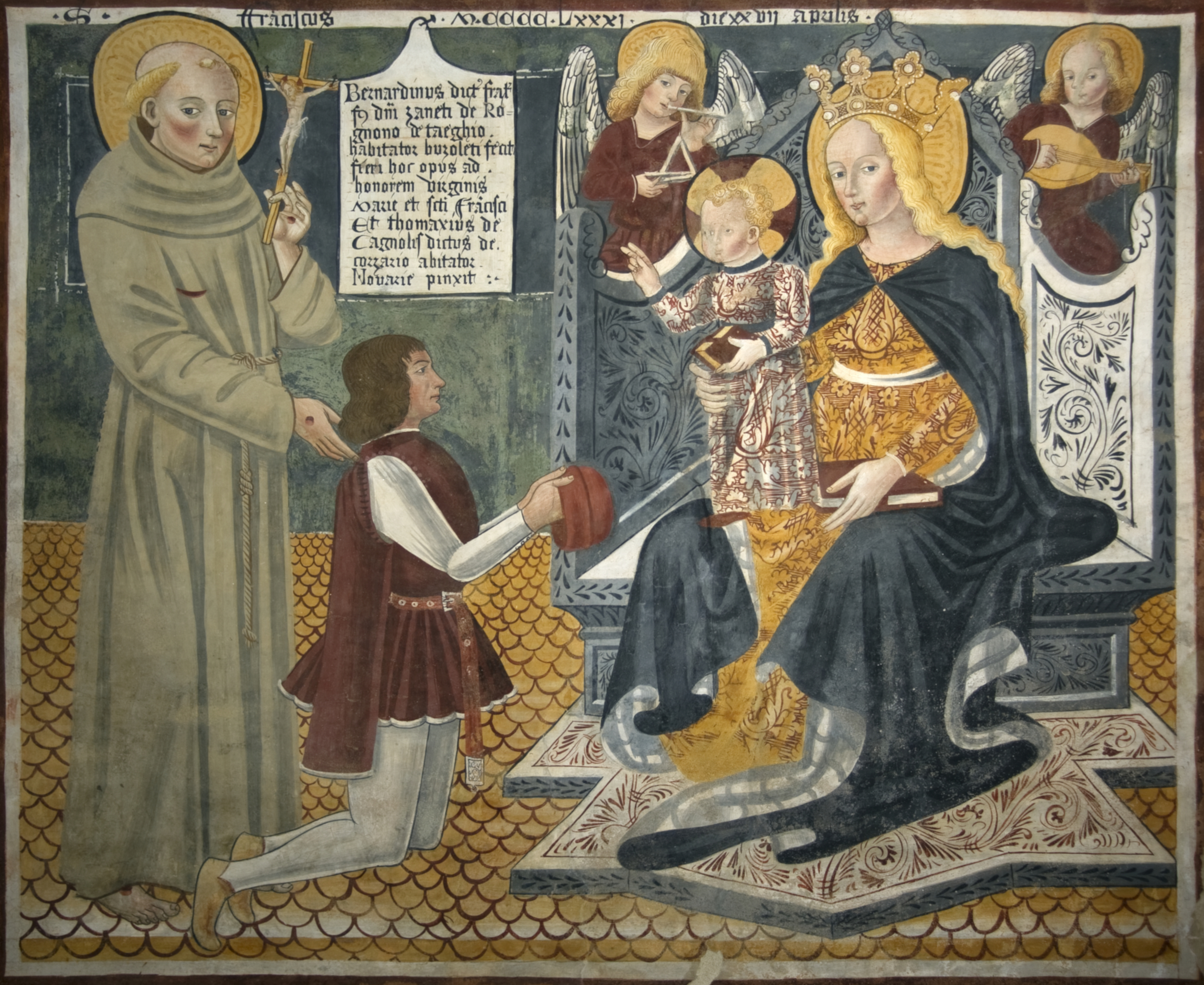
Detail with portrait of the patron

In the second half of the 15th century, during the period of stability and subsequent prosperity under the Sforza rule of the Duchy of Milan, pictorial art had a great development, especially fresco painting. In this context Buzzoletto, together with Moncucco and several other local landowners, participated in the decoration of the Oratorio di Santa Maria, the largest devotional centre of the place: Bernardinus [...] de Rognono de taeghio habitator buzoleti commissioned the painter Tommaso Cagnola to paint the fresco of the Madonna with Child, two angels and St. Francis presenting the patron in the apse of the small church. The Rognoni family came from Val Taleggio in the Bergamo area, and had most likely arrived in the Novara lowlands in search of new pastures. Scholar Franca Franzosi, investigating the archives of the Major Hospital of Novara, discovered that the Rognonis at the time were tenants of hospital lands belonging to the Buzzoletto estate. From the commissioning of the fresco, it can be deduced that the Rognonis were a very wealthy, non-noble, family of farmers. In particular, the choice of the patron Bernardino Rognoni to represent Saint Francis allows us to deduce that he belonged to a religious congregation, most likely a Franciscan tertiary. Furthermore, several elements confirm the financial availability of Bernardino, dominus Zaneto's son: the presence of his portrait and the cartouche that clearly identifies him, the refined clothing, the commissioning of the fresco to Tommaso Cagnola himself, the central position of the work in the apse of the oratory. In addition to the precious details about the commissioner, the work is very important because the precise dating (27 April 1481) and the author's signature have allowed scholars to temporally place the artist's many works and to understand his stylistic evolution.

The noble Cacciapiatti family, who since the beginning of the 15th century had been expanding their possessions in the Lower Novarese and in 1441 had obtained the tithe of Garbagna, in 1497 added the rights on the Buzzoletto duties, together with those on the grain mill and on the entrance to the gates of Novara.

===== Modern age =====
In 1548, the cadastre of Charles V (also known as Catasto Bergamino) shows that the estate extended over approximately 156 hectares (510 moggia, of which 300 were ploughland, 10 were vineyards, 100 were meadows, 50 were dry meadows, and 50 were woods) and was inhabited by a single family (hearth), who had access to a farmhouse and a mill. The owners were the heirs of Pietro Francesco Cacciapiatti.

In the 17th century it was an autonomous municipality, headed by Vespolate. More specifically, the documentation of the State revenues of the Duchy of Milan in 1626 reports Buzzoletto (like the nearby Calzavacca) not being enfeoffed and surrounded by lands which were instead: Garbagna to Count Geronimo Della Porta, Terdobbiate to Count Cicogna, Olengo to the Castaldos and Cerano to the Gallaratis.

Around 1723, with the administrative reorganisation following the Theresian Carastre, the community of the nearby Calzavacca farmstead was not deemed sufficient to maintain the status of municipality and was aggregated to Buzzoletto Vecchio. In the second part of the century (1767 and 1778) it is reported to belong to the Caroelli family.

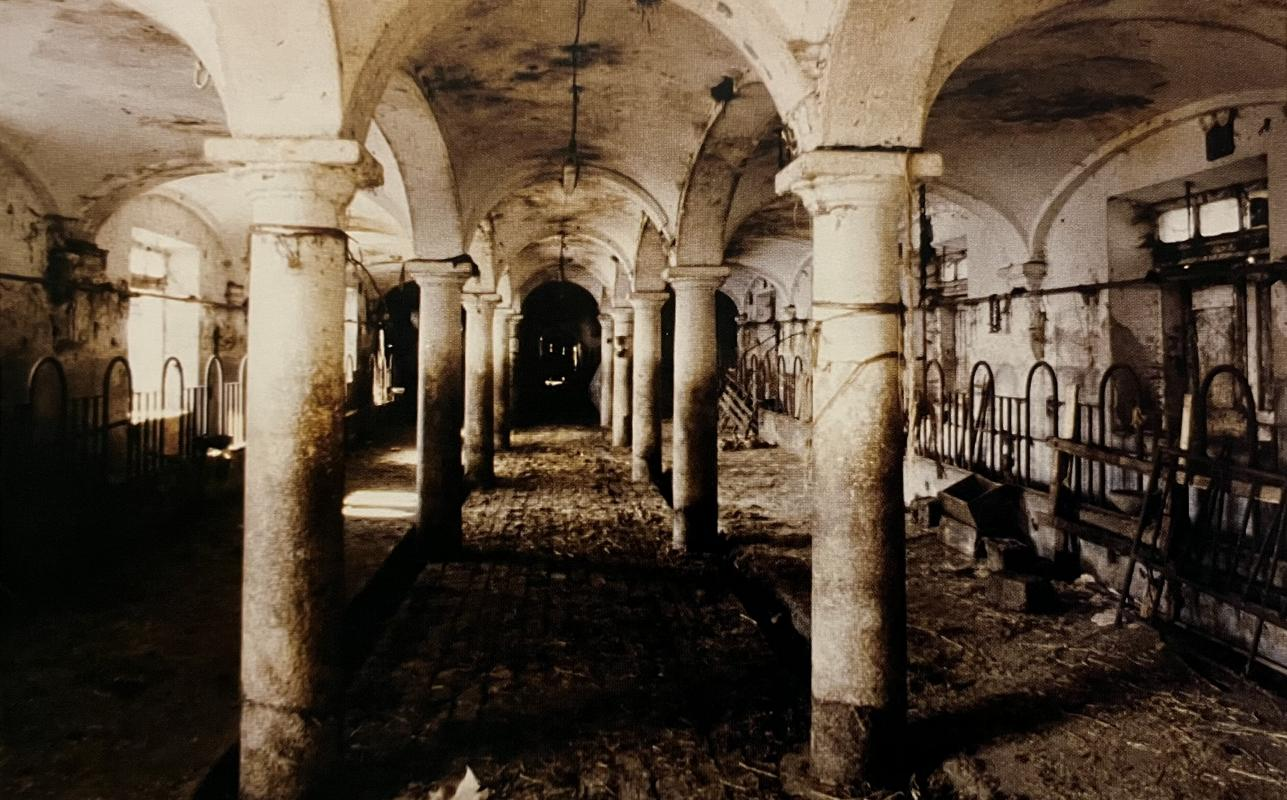
Ancient stables, dating back to the 16th century

In 1802, on the occasion of the further administrative reorganization requested by Napoleonic France, within the Department of Agogna (District I) it was aggregated to Olengo together with Moncucco (Olengo with Moncucco, and Buzzoletto).

===== Contemporary age =====
Like Moncucco, between the 18th and 19th centuries Buzzoletto progressively lost its administrative independence, becoming a hamlet of Garbagna (see section Aggregation to Garbagna).

The municipal archives of Garbagna document that in 1821 the owners were still the Cacciapiatti family (specifically the Marquis Luigi Gaudenzio, domiciled in Turin), whose agent was the priest Francesco Boggiani, in charge of dealing with the municipality of Garbagna itself.

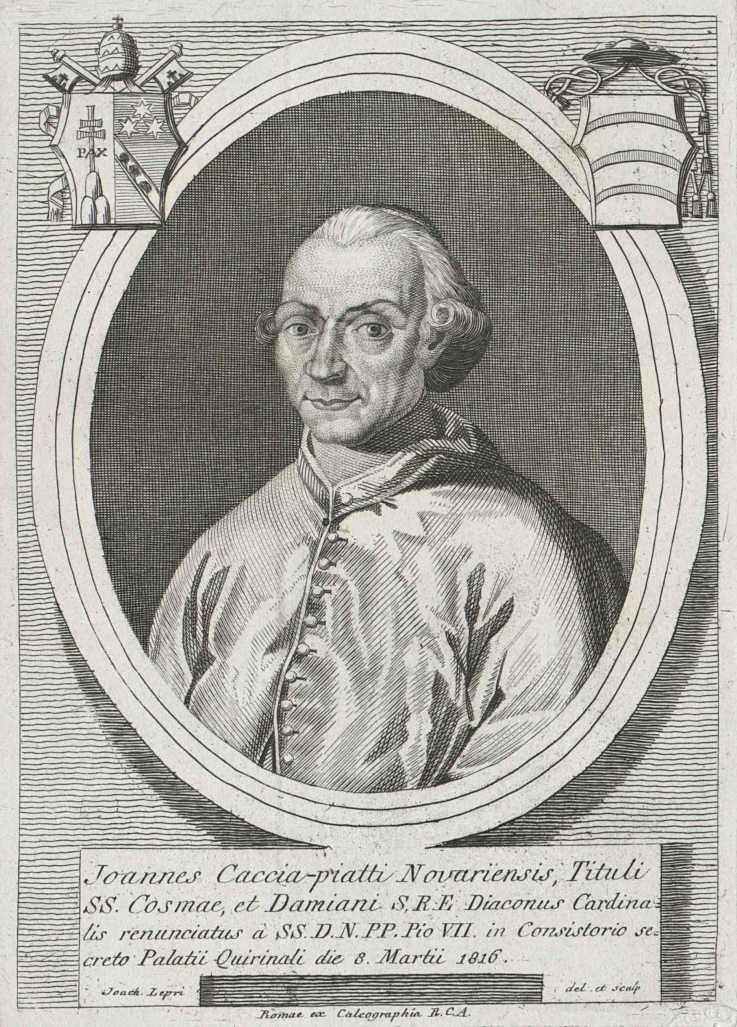
Cardinal Giovanni Cacciapiatti spent his summers in Buzzoletto

On August 6, 1822, an exceptional hailstorm caused the total loss of the crop. The resulting damage allows us to outline the estate's production capacity during those years: 73,650 lire for 5900 bags of paddy rice, 30 bags of beans, 150 bags of corn and 150 bunches of grapes. (Note: Specifically: 12 lire per sack of paddy rice, 12 lire per sack of beans, 10 lire per sack of cornmeal, 7 lire per pound of grapes.) For the same four products the estimated damages in the Garbagna area amounted to less than 12,000 lire.

In 1822 Buzzoletto with Calzavacca had 198 residents, increased to 220 in 1840 and 277 in 1879.

The complex was divided into two parts by a wall around the 1930s, isolating the older section (the southern one) from the rest of the buildings. Consequently, the main entrance was also split.

Buzzoletto Vecchio was the scene of the only tragedy that directly involved the municipality of Garbagna during the Second World War. At dawn on August 24, 1944, units of the police headquarters and the Black Brigades forcibly abducted thirteen young draft dodgers who were hiding and working in Buzzoletto, imprisoning them in the cells of the Novara Castle. As a reprisal for some sabotage actions carried out in those days by the "Loss" mobile brigade (the road and railway bridges over the Cavour Canal were blown up), on the morning of the 26th, on the orders of the police commissioner Emilio Pasqualy and the prefect Enrico Vezzalini, the thirteen prisoners were led by the team of the commander Vincenzo Martino to the railway bridge of Vignale and there massacred by deception with bursts of machine gun fire, under the dismayed eyes of the population. The following year, on August 26, 1945, during a commemoration ceremony, a plaque was placed at the entrance to the Buzzoletto farmhouse, commemorating what became known as the Vignale massacre. The plaque reads: To the martyrs of Vignale, innocent victims of tyrannical hatred, so that their bloody name may resound where they lived, an echo of love (the thirteen names and their respective ages at the time of death follow).

In 1948 the owners of the estate were the Tornielli and Pollini families.

Over the centuries, several families of farmers and breeders operating in Buzzoletto Vecchio stood out for the levels of production achieved, winning various awards both locally and nationally: Caresana, Colli, Gallina, Gambaro, Giarda and the Tornielli marquises themselves. During the years of the economic boom, the management was divided between the Caresana and Colli families, whose companies were classified as large and medium respectively, both renowned for the aforementioned production levels and for the results of the experiments on rice seeds (for example, in 1950 the orientation camp for the new rice varieties in the province of Novara was held on the fields of Attilio Colli). The Caresana family also became involved in the politics and organisation of the primary sector, both at a local, inter-provincial and even inter-regional level.

The number of inhabitants according to the post-war censuses: 117 in 1951, 127 in 1961 and 40 in 1971.

==== Description ====
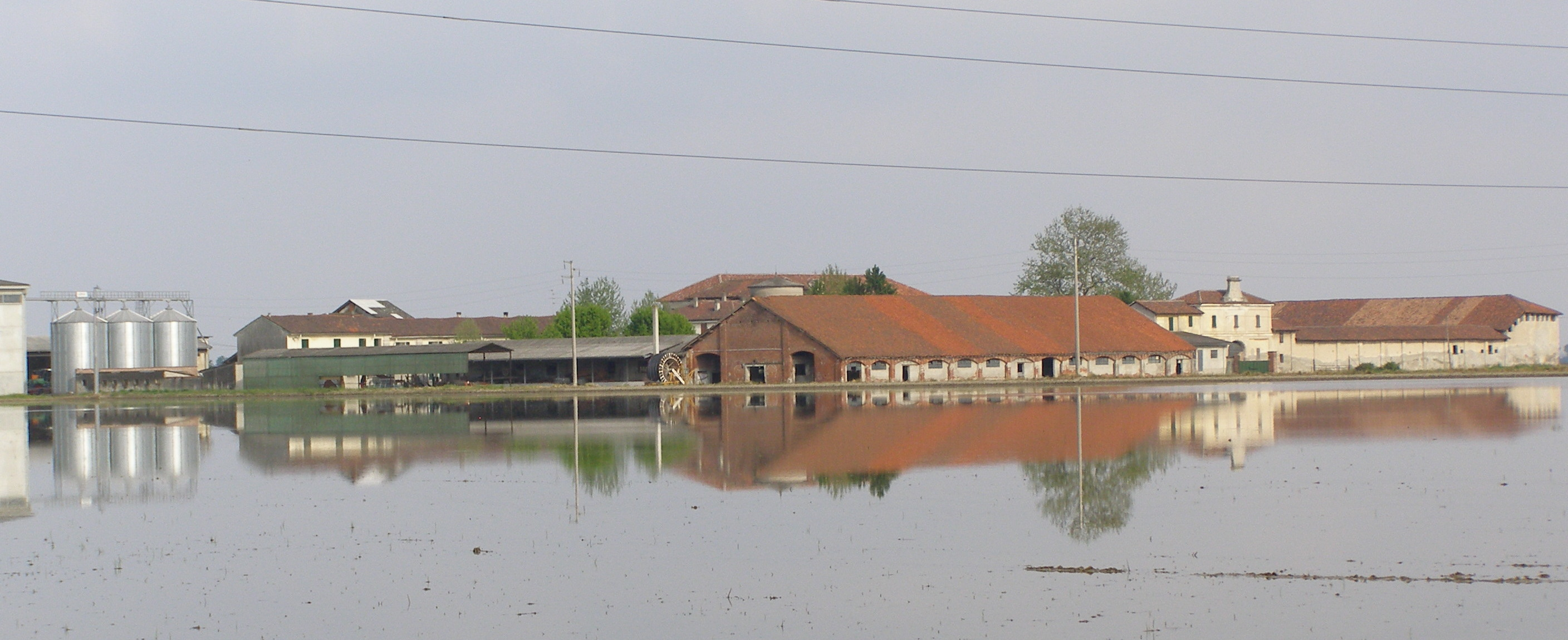
View from the rice fields

The current structure is composed of buildings from different eras.

The entrance, located to the west, is double, following the construction of the dividing wall in the 1930s, which separated the oldest part (the southern one) from the rest of the complex. At the other end of the dividing wall is the Oratory of the Presentation of the Virgin Mary in the Temple, behind which is a smaller residential building.

The southern part consists of a square courtyard overlooked by an abandoned building. To the east of the latter stands a three-story building that serves as a warehouse and shelter for agricultural vehicles.

On the northern side are three main buildings: a stable, a dwelling (dating back to the 1940s), and a warehouse for storing materials and machinery. More recent, smaller buildings were erected on the northern side, all dependent on the stable, together with some silos, one of which is ancient.

As of 2003, the old part of the southern complex was abandoned, while the warehouse, like the buildings to the north, is in good condition. The oratory is also in good condition.

==== Oratory ====
The farmstead includes an oratory dedicated to the Presentation of the Virgin Mary in the Temple, near the dividing wall.

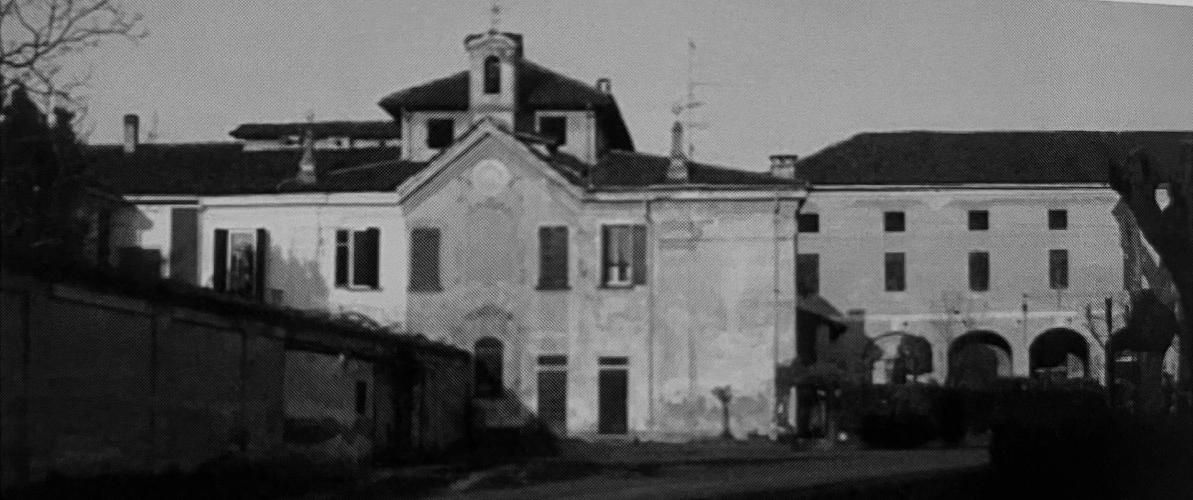
Oratory of Buzzoletto Vecchio, seen from the courtyard

The oratory was visited in 1762 by Bishop Marco Aurelio Balbis Bertone, who provided a description of it: a north-facing façade with a single door, a window above the altar, and a small bell tower, all in a distinctly Baroque style. Inside, it was paved and vaulted, with a painted wooden altar surmounted by an altarpiece consisting of a leaning panel depicting the Presentation of the Virgin Mary in the Temple, flanked by a built-in cupboard and a sink. The oratory's good condition and the required number of furnishings allowed it to be used for Mass. The oratory was maintained by the families of the farmhouse and had its own chaplain.

In 1823, on the occasion of the pastoral visit of Bishop Giuseppe Morozzo, a rich set of furnishings was reported in the report: five chasubles, a silver chalice, a gilded brass chalice with a silver cup, six silver-plated copper candlesticks with a cross, six silver-plated wooden candlesticks and two missals.

When the complex was divided into two parts by a wall around the 1930s, the facade of the oratory was also damaged.

In the second half of the century, Ernesto Colli reported that the painting of the Presentation had deteriorated considerably. The oratory was also decorated with several other paintings of considerable artistic value and the two coats of arms of the Cacciapiatti and Tornielli families, its former owners. At that time, the parish priest of Garbagna went to the oratory every Sunday to celebrate Mass.

==== Image gallery ====
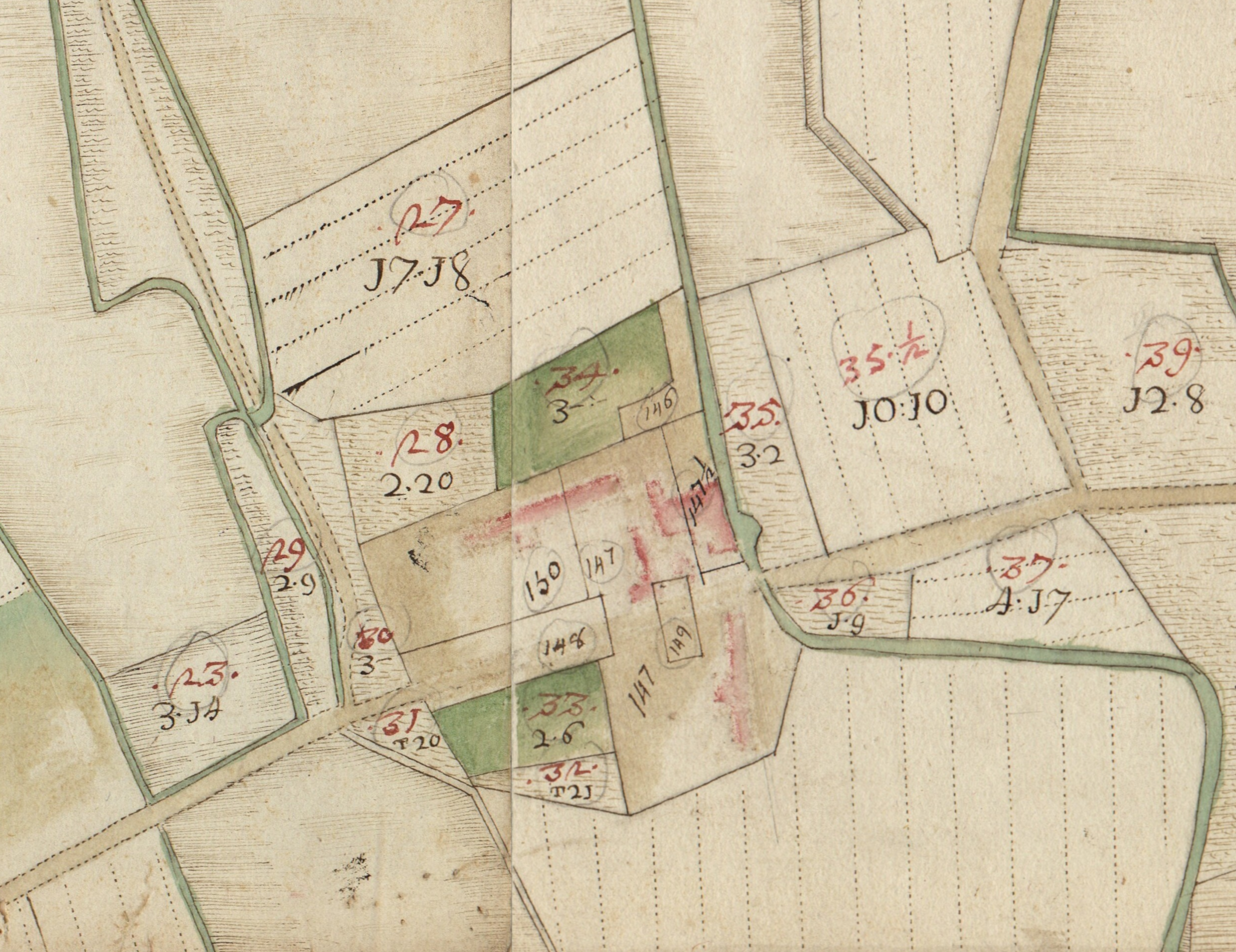
Plan in Theresian Cadastre (1723)

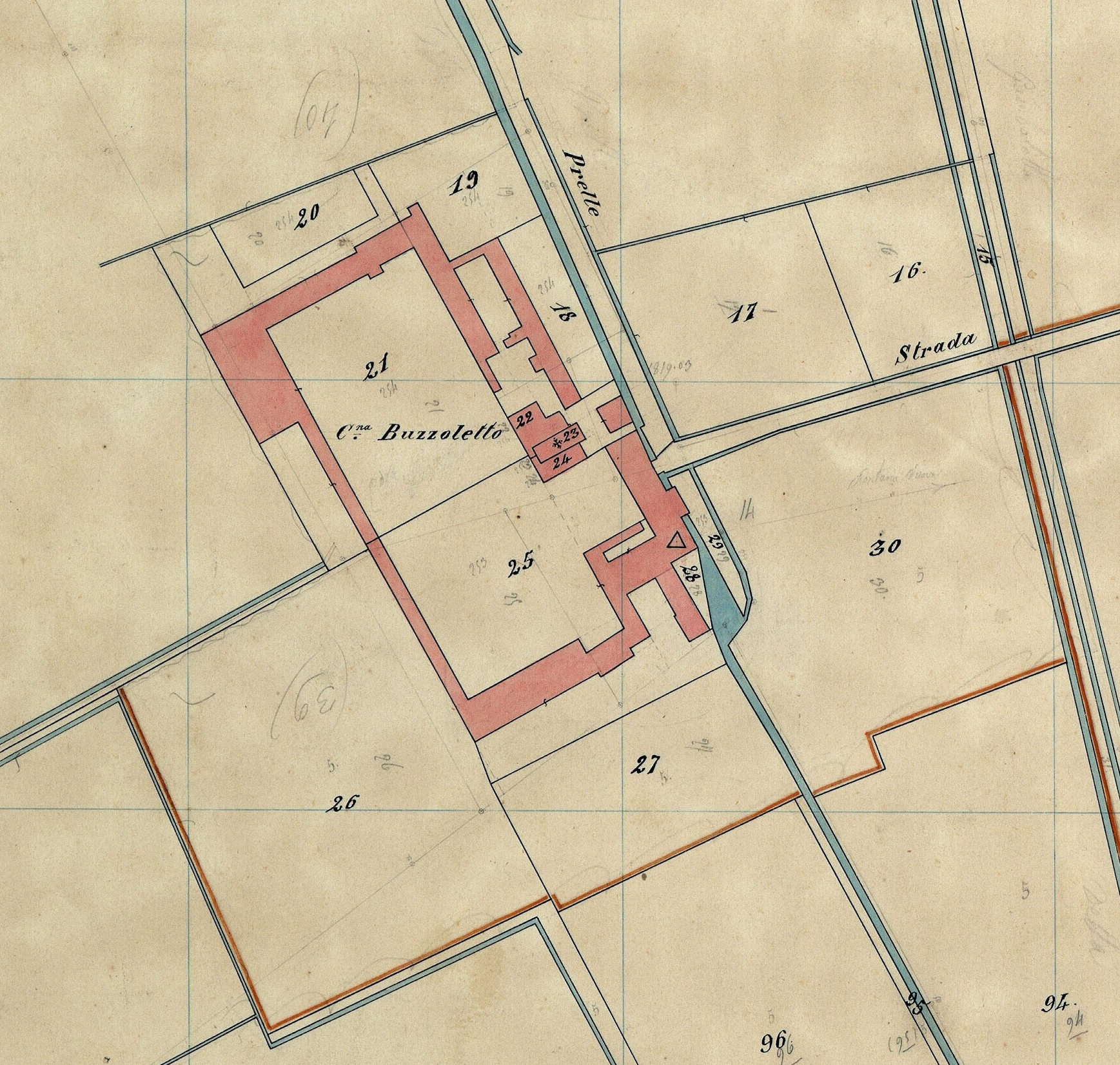
Plan in Rabbini Cadastre (1867)

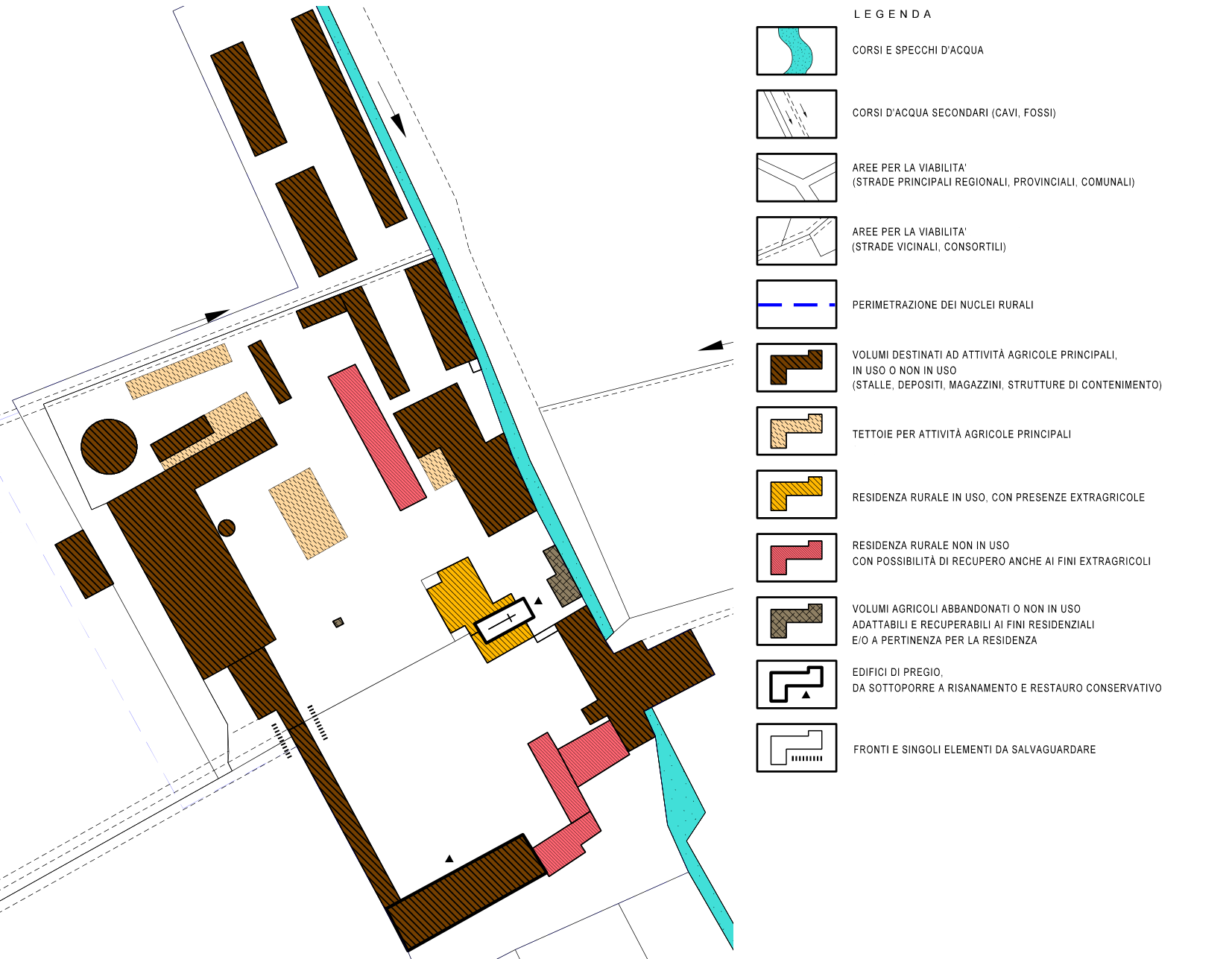
Plan in P.R.G.C. (Note: Piano Regolatore Generale Comunale: Municipal General Regulatory Plan.) (2003)

=== Moncucco ===
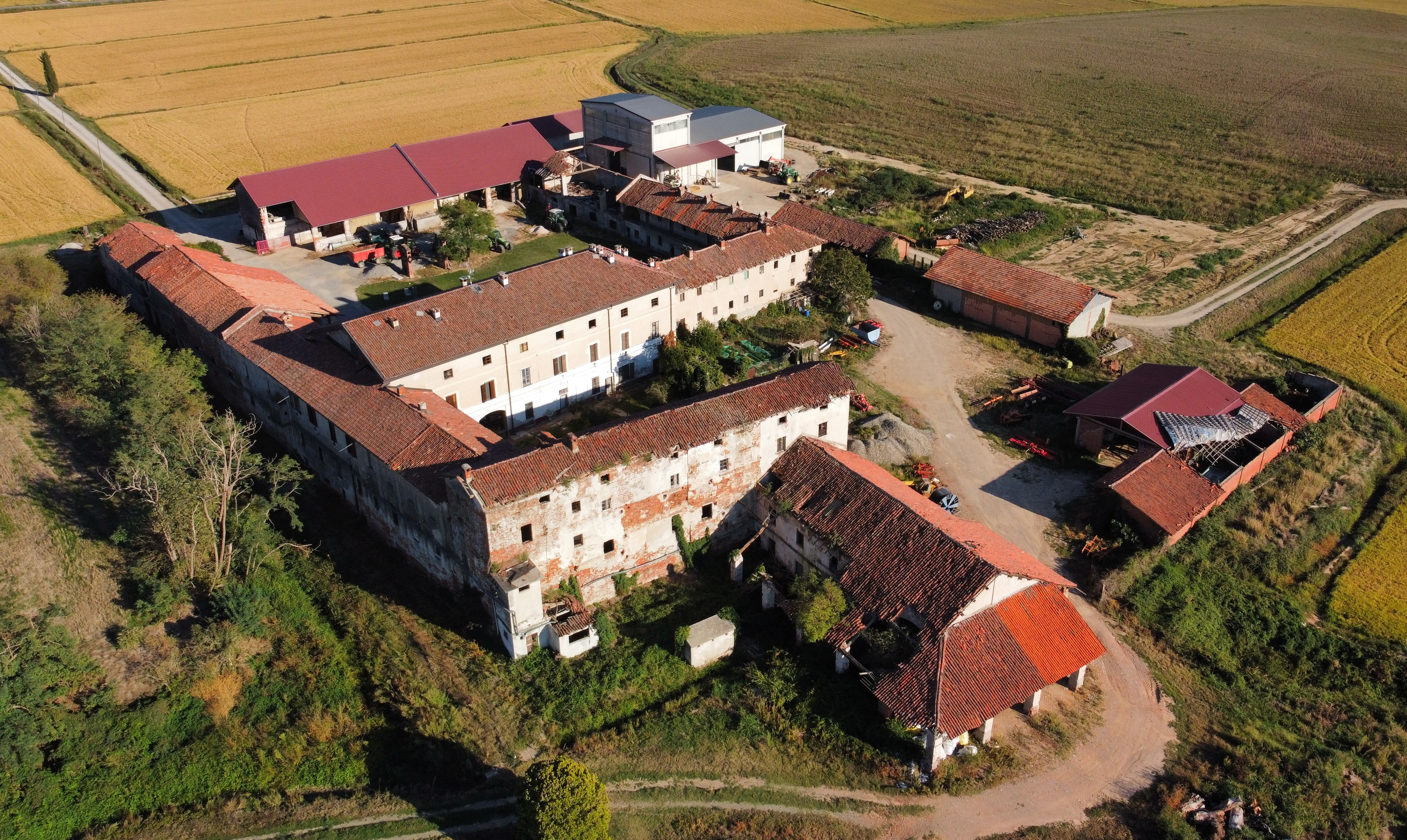
Moncucco seen from north-west (2022)

It is the oldest farmstead of Garbagna. The name, which Angelo Luigi Stoppa believes to indicate the specific environmental condition (Moncuco means mount top), also appears in documents in the alternative spellings Moncuco and Montecucco.

==== History ====
===== Middle ages =====
A document from the Capitular Archives of Novara Cathedral, dating back to the first half of the 12th century, mentions the place: among the fields and meadows belonging to Robaldo and Olrico from Carisio's sons in the territory of Garbagna, a piece of land is located in Monte Cuco area, bordering to the east with a San Lorenzo monastery property, to the north with Ugo De Muro (the lord of Garbagna) and to the west with lands of the Brusati family (Novara nobles) (Note: The document is generally dated to the 12th century. However, a document of the summer 1154 reports Ugo De Muro as having died, so the dating of the first document can be refined to the first half of the 12th century.) (Note: In 1887, the Turin historian Carlo Dionisotti interpreted the expression Mons Acutus as a reference to Moncucco of Garbagna in an Imperial and Royal Diplomatic document dated October 1152, in which Emperor Frederick Barbarossa donated the estate to Guido the Great (Guido III of Biandrate), Count of Biandrate, for his services and demonstrated valor in Lombardy. The donation included Garbagna and Olengo, along with other lands in the Novara, Vercelli, and Asti areas. Dionisotti reported that Moncucco and Garbagna belonged at that time to Rodolfo di Moncucco, Guido's father-in-law. In September 1209, the donation was confirmed by Emperor Otto IV of Brunswick. This interpretation, however, was never confirmed or repeated by any subsequent study. For example, in 1952, historian Francesco Cognasso, in his monumental monograph on Novara history, dealing with the same topic, simply reported Mons Acutus as such, alongside all the other toponyms translated into their respective modern versions. The documents cited by the two scholars follow: Enrico Bianchetti, ed. (1878). "Doc. XXIV - 1152 Ottobre - Diploma di Federico imperatore, dato a Guidone conte di Biandrate, figlio di Alberto, con cui gli conferma varii possedimenti, fra cui Medolo e la contea d'Ossola". L'Ossola Inferiore. Notizie storiche e documenti (in Latin). Vol. 2. Rome, Turin, Florence: F.lli Bocca. pp. 75–78 – via Google Books; Enrico Bianchetti, ed. (1878). "Doc. XXX - 1196 Ottobre - Diploma di Enrico VI imperatore, col quale conferma ai conti di Biandrate i loro possedimenti, fra cui il contado di Ossola". L'Ossola Inferiore. Notizie storiche e documenti (in Latin). Vol. 2. Rome, Torino, Firenze: F.lli Bocca. pp. 94–97; "Doc. DCCXCI - Ottone IV re de' Romani concede ai figliuoli del fu conte Ranieri di Biandrate le ragioni dell'impero sulla città e sul vescovado d'Ivrea - 1209, 1 settembre". Historiae Patriae Monumenta. Chartarum (in Latin). Vol. 1. Turin. 1836. pp. 1162–1164 – via Internet Archive.). In those years, therefore, the toponym did not yet identify a settlement, or at least not a settlement of a certain importance.

In the following two centuries it became a notable settlement, to the point of being entrusted to a dominus (lord): on the Consignationes of 1347 the owners were Bozus de Montechuco and the dominus Gregorius de Montechucho.

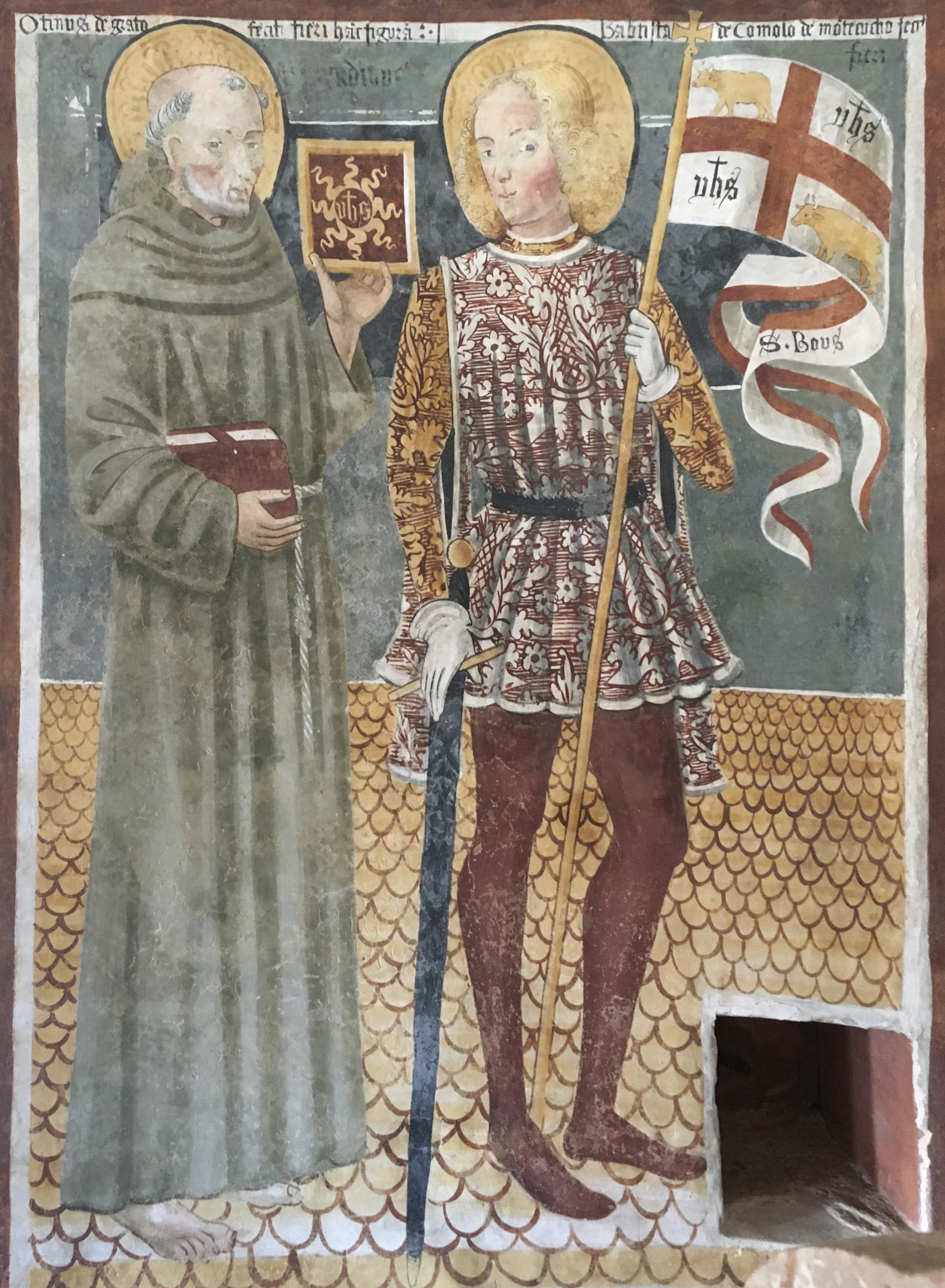
Fresco of Saint Bobo in the Oratorio di Santa Maria, commissioned at the end of the 15th century by Battista Comoli from Moncucco
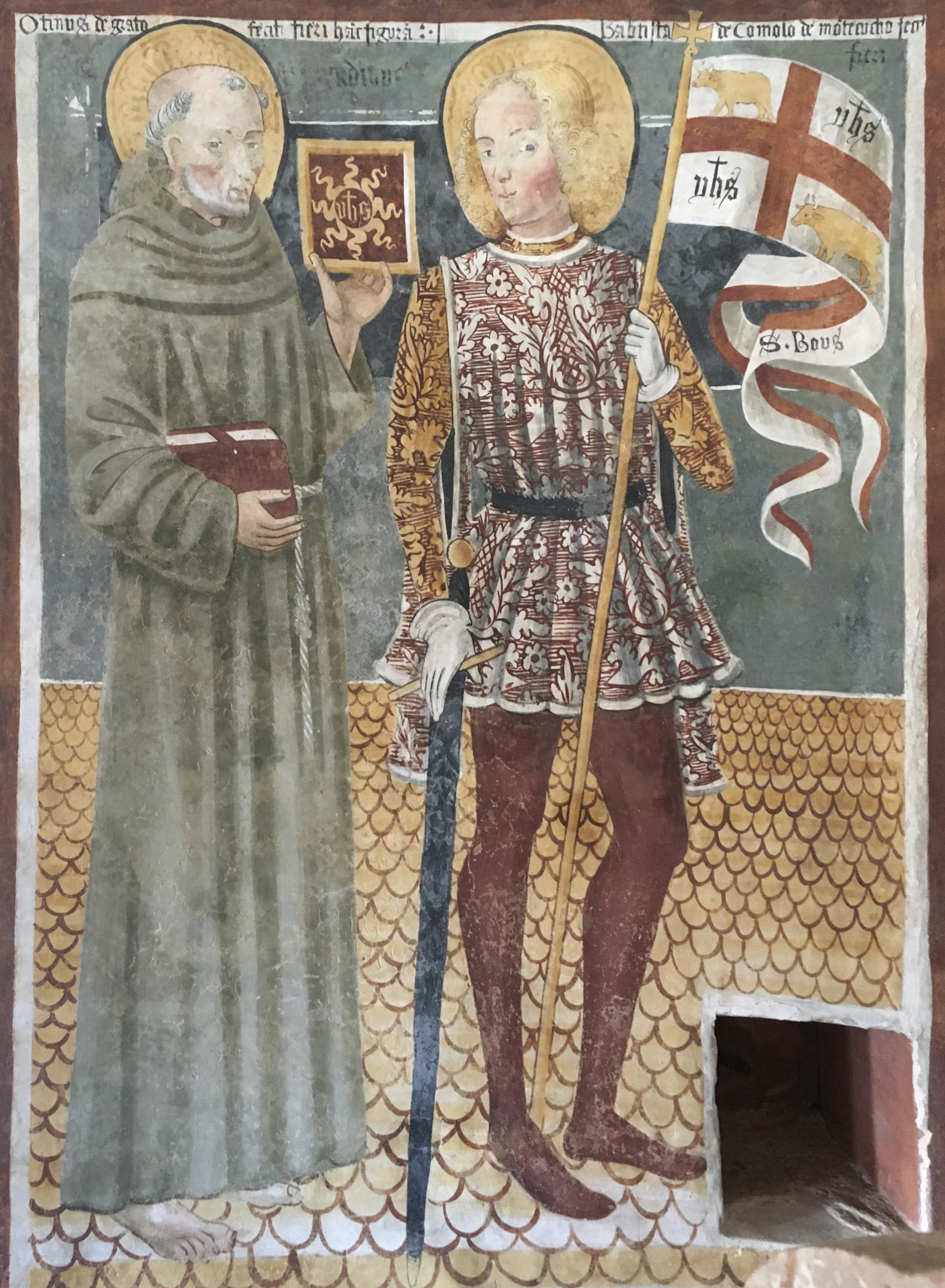
Fresco detail identifying the patron: Baptista de Comolo de Montecucho fecit fieri

In the second half of the 15th century, during the period of stability and subsequent prosperity under the Sforza rule of the Duchy of Milan, pictorial art had a great development, especially fresco painting. In this context Moncucco, together with Buzzoletto and several other local landowners, participated in the decoration of the Oratorio di Santa Maria, the major devotional centre of the place: Baptista de Comolo de Montecucho commissioned the fresco of Saint Bobo in the apse of the small church from the workshop of Tommaso Cagnola. From the chosen subject it can be deduced that Battista Comoli was a wealthy farmer or peasant, among the major landowners of the place, who sought the favour of the saint: Saint Bobo was often chosen by the wealthy classes for his legendary belonging to the nobility, which they longed for. The client's financial availability is also confirmed by the hiring of the Cagnola workshop, one of the most renowned and sought after in those years.

During the same period of Milanese domination, on 15 April 1483 Moncucco was sold and enfeoffed by Gian Galeazzo Sforza to his secretary Luigi Terzago. From the sales contract it is clear that from then on Moncucco was among the villages forced to pay a tax on bread, meat, wine and fodder.

===== Modern age =====
According to the Charles V Cadastre of 1548 (Catasto Bergamino), the estate consisted of 145 hectares (475 moggia and 4 staia), of which 116 were ploughland, 6 were vineyards and 23 were meadows. It was inhabited by three family groups (hearths) and among the owners was Gio Filippo Cazza from Proh.

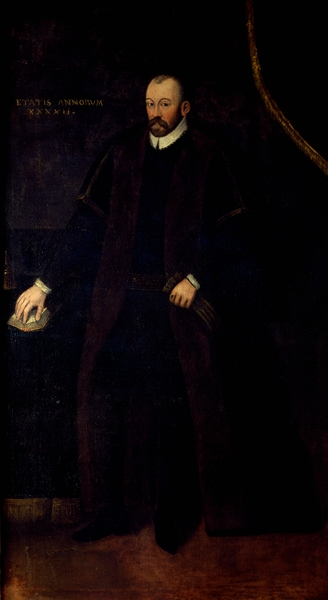
Amico Canobio, owner of Moncucco at the end of the 16th century

In 1592, upon the death of the owner Amico Canobio, the estate had an extension of 206 hectares (3,160 pertiche), which were donated by testamentary disposition to the Monte di Pietà of Novara, founded by Canobio himself. However, only 45 hectares (700 pertiche) actually reached the institute in 1594, once the bureaucratic obstacles placed by the Novara Church in order to oppose that man who did not look favourably upon it had been overcome.

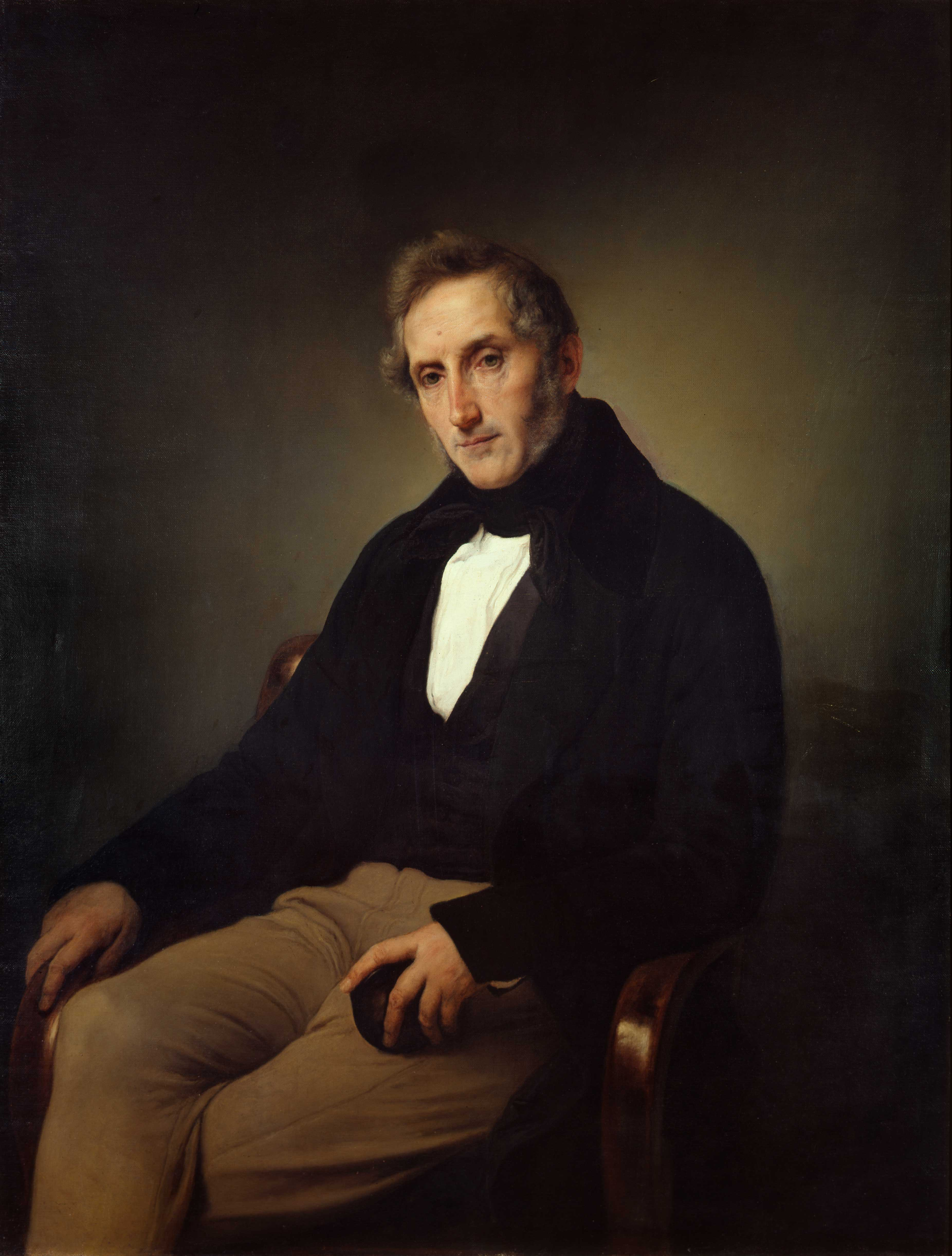
Alessandro Manzoni's nobility consisted of the title of Lord of Moncucco of Mirasole

In the 17th century it was an autonomous municipality, which on 23 February 1691 Pietro Antonio Manzoni, great-grandfather of Alessandro, purchased as a fief (created on that occasion and dependent on Mirasole, a farmstead-castle near Caltignaga), ensuring the noble title to his family. Around 1723, with the administrative reorganisation following the Theresian Cadastre, its community was not considered sufficient to maintain the status of municipality (like 18 other communities of the Lower Novarese) and became a fraction of Garbagna. In 1753 the fief passed to his son Alessandro Valeriano and in 1773 to the latter's second-born son, Pietro (presumed father of the famous Alessandro).

In 1764 there were 83 inhabitants.

In 1802, during the administrative reorganisation requested by the Napoleonic France government, within the Department of Agogna (District I) it was aggregated to Olengo, together with Buzzoletto (Olengo con Moncucco, e Buzzoletto).

===== Contemporary age =====
Like Buzzoletto, between the 18th and 19th centuries Moncucco progressively lost its administrative independence, becoming a fraction of Garbagna (see section Aggregation to Garbagna).

In 1800 the estate had more than doubled the size left by Canobio, reaching 1534 pertiche. At that time the right of exploitation was assigned through auction; specifically, in 1833 the assignee was the noblewoman Francesca Morbio (widow Bollini and last representative of the firstborn branch of the Morbio family), who owned some bordering properties and in turn contracted out buildings and lands of Moncucco through a sub-auction procedure, made official with publication in the Gazzetta Piemontese. The publication of the aforementioned auction did not specify its duration, however the details can be found in the publications of subsequent auctions: twelve years in 1888 and nine in 1936.

Thanks to the administration of the Monte di Pietà, other lands were later aggregated, including the farms of Olengo and Bicocca, reaching in 1870 the 3200 pertiche reported by Lino Cassani still in 1948.

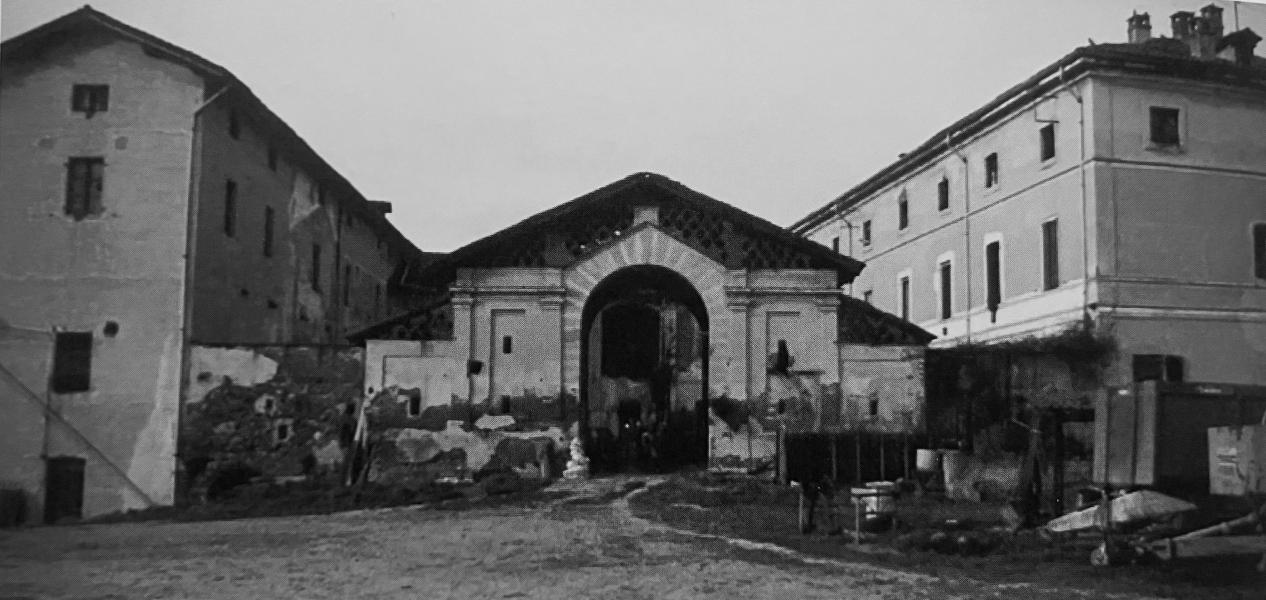
Ancient entrance to Moncucco

In the first half of the 20th century, Moncucco was rented to the Brustia family, a renowned family of farmers from Novara, whose management led to notable progress recognised by the victory of various prizes. Towards the middle of the 20th century, the management passed to the Tosi family, who were also rewarded for the results obtained.

In the ferment of technological progress in Italy during the economic boom and the activities that promoted it, in 1964 the Tosi brothers took part by hosting in Moncucco the annual provincial motor ploughing competition, organised by the Provincial Committee for the development of agricultural mechanisation and valid for admission to the national championships.

Between the 1950s and 1970s, various lands of the estate located along the provincial road were sold to the manufacturing company SIDA (men's clothing) and to the entrepreneur Oscar Comazzi, who would have built the headquarters of Metro-Com and the adjacent villa there.

In 1822 inhabitants were 60, as well as in 1840. The post-war censuses show the following figures: 68 in both 1951 and 1961, 46 in 1971.

Retracing some steps of its history, in 1948 Ernesto Colli stated that Moncucco was greatly disadvantaged over the centuries by the roughness of the territory (a large part of which was hilly) and by the valleys subject to the frequent floods of Arbogna. Without these unfavourable conditions, it would have been a much richer and more powerful settlement.

==== Description ====
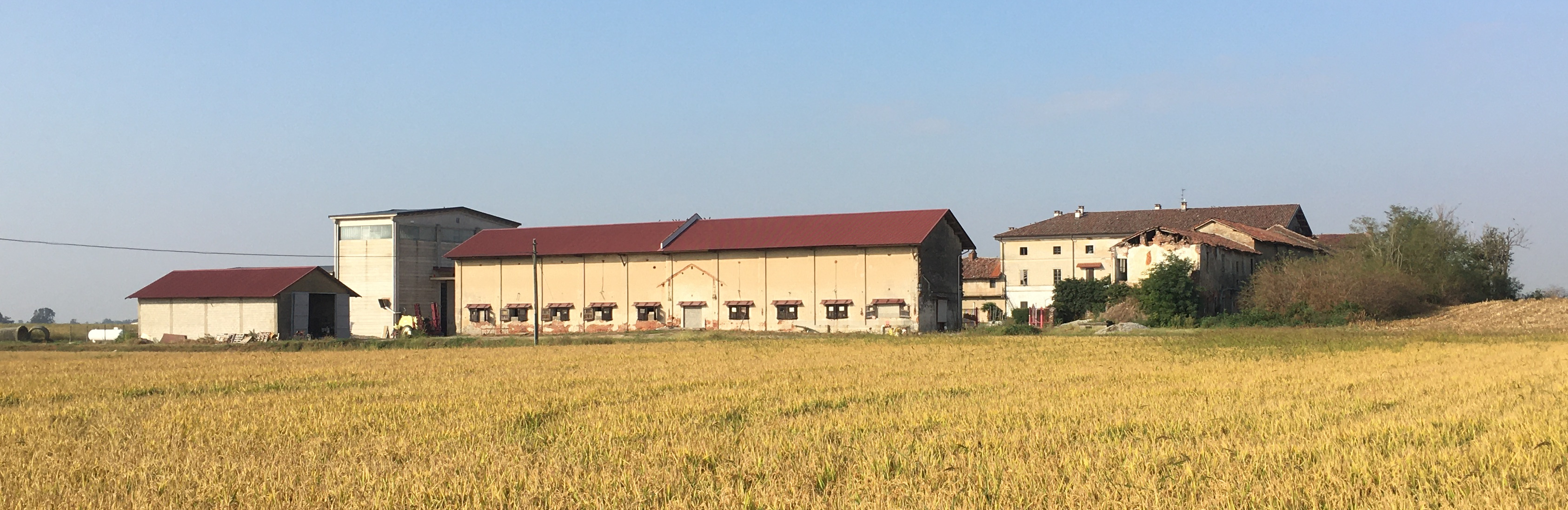
View from road 211

The complex is arranged around two courtyards onto which both the residential and agricultural buildings overlook. The main courtyard is bordered to the north by a building used for storing agricultural materials, to the east and south by two buildings used as a warehouse/barn. The smaller courtyard, where it is believed the ancient entrance to the villa once stood, is located to the west of the main courtyard and is bordered to the west by the old three-storey house, to the north by a two-storey building with a loggia on the second floor and to the east by the current house.

As of 2009, the condition of the residential and agricultural structures is fair. The old part of the building, although abandoned, appears to be rather well-kept.

==== Oratory ====
In the past the farmhouse was equipped with an oratory, dedicated to St. Mary of Victories and located to the east of the buildings, next to the road leading to the estate.

It is mentioned in the mid-17th century, when Monsignor Odescalchi (Note: The source does not specify whether it is Benedetto Odescalchi, bishop from 1650 to 1656, or Giulio Maria Odescalchi, Benedetto's successor until 1666.) forbade the celebration of mass there, as no one provided the necessary furnishings.

The following century, in 1723, the oratory was reported in the Theresian Cadastre and in 1794 the walls and altar were found to be in good condition, although the prohibition to celebrate mass there continued due to the lack of furnishings.

In 1823, on the occasion of the pastoral visit of Bishop Giuseppe Morozzo, it was described as completely abandoned, given the aforementioned prohibition. From the visit report it emerges that the facade faced north, with a small cross-shaped window above the entrance door.

In 1948 Ernesto Colli reported it as destroyed.

==== Image gallery ====
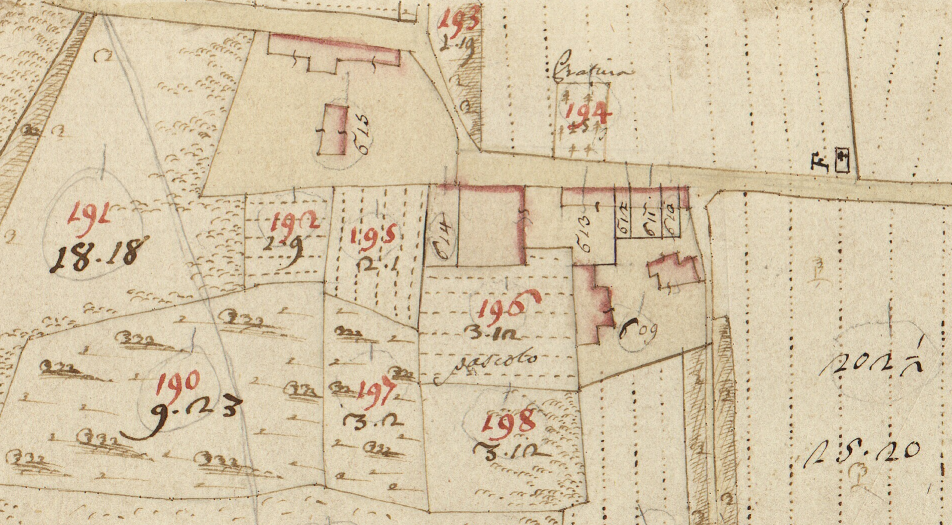
Plan of Theresian Cadastre (1723)

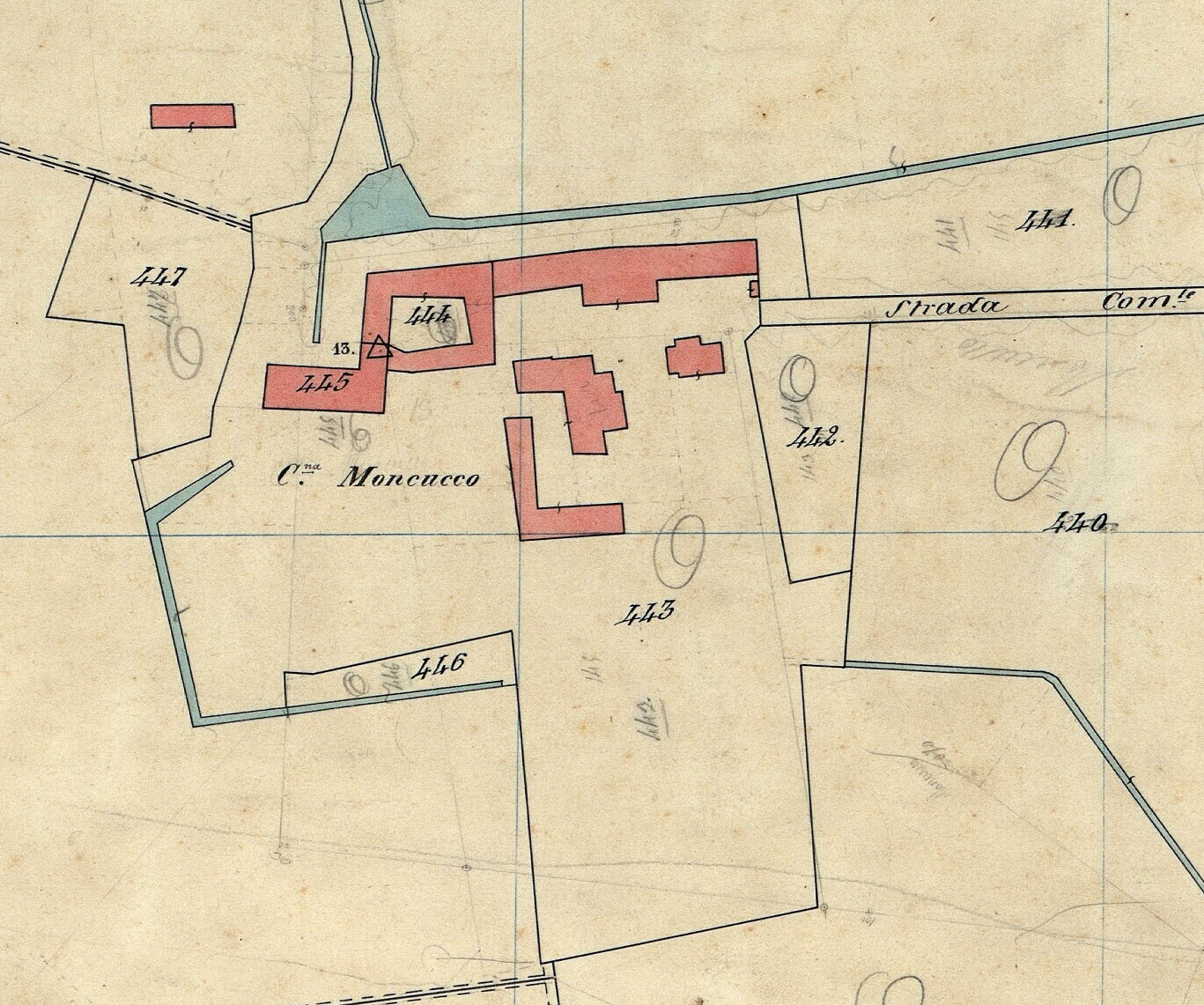
Plan of Rabbini Cadastre (1867)

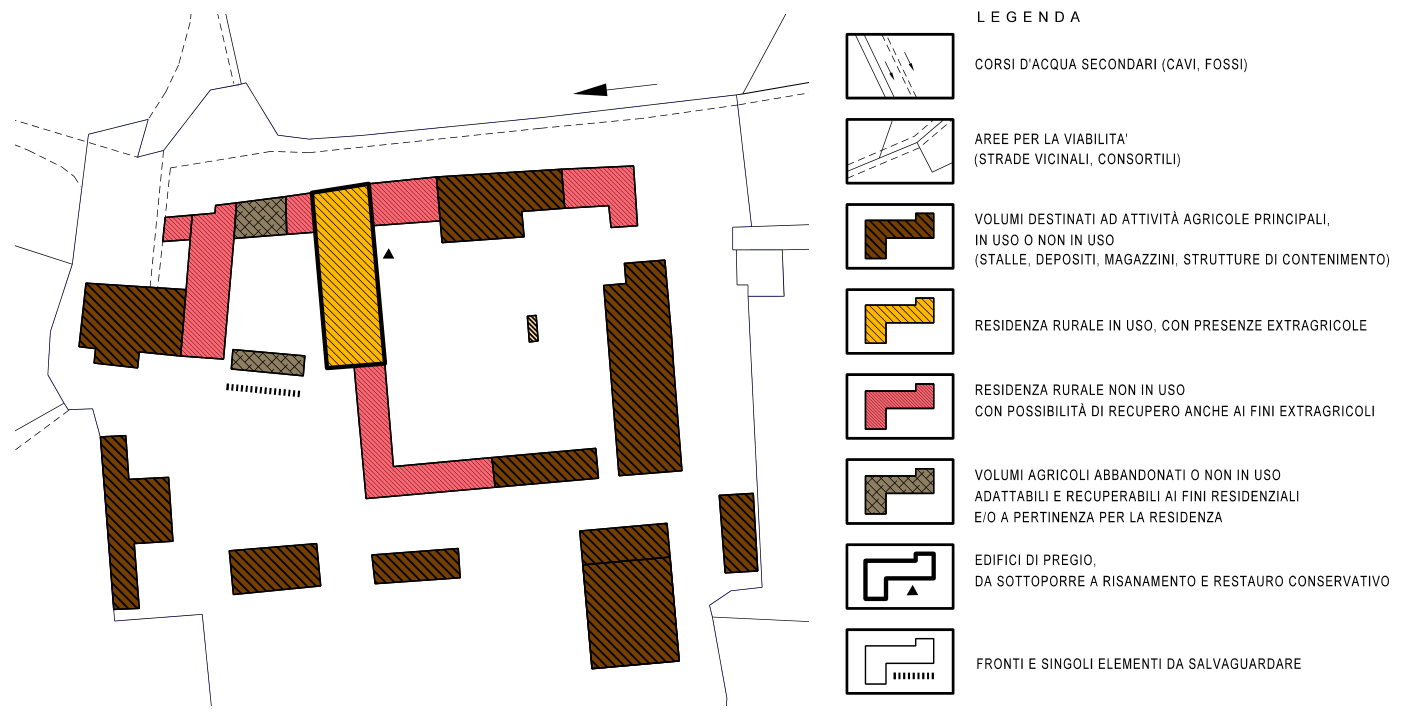
Plan of P.R.G.C. (2003)

=== Aggregation to Garbagna ===
In the 17th century Buzzoletto and Moncucco were small independent settlements, included in the Contado of Novara.

Both saw their administrative autonomy reduced starting from the 18th century, before 1775: first Moncucco and then Buzzoletto.

From 1775, the year of the abolition of the county and the promulgation of the Regulation for the administration of public bodies in the cities, villages and places of the royal states on the mainland and on this side of the mountains by King Victor Amadeus III of Savoy, they fell under the management of the Ordinary Council of Garbagna. The two aggregated communities participated in the municipal administration only for particularly important questions: on such occasions the representatives of the two communities (i.e. the owners of the lands) joined the ordinary councillors, with the prior authorisation of the General Intendant, in the capacity of additional councillors (and the council was defined as Doubled).

For several decades the two settlements maintained a partial independence, seeing their individuality, interests and assets recognised, even if classified as aggregated hamlets. This did not prevent Cesare Morbio, owner of Moncucco, from being appointed mayor of Garbagna in 1837.

The total loss of independence was sanctioned by a decree of 14 September 1840 (executive since 1841), the result of the resolutions of the Doubled Council with which the representatives of Buzzoletto and Moncucco agreed to the concentration of assets and liabilities (i.e. public income and expenditure) in a single register. The only aspects that the two communities continued to manage autonomously were the rights to use woods, moors and pastures, according to their respective ancient customs.

== Other farmsteads ==
=== Brusattina ===
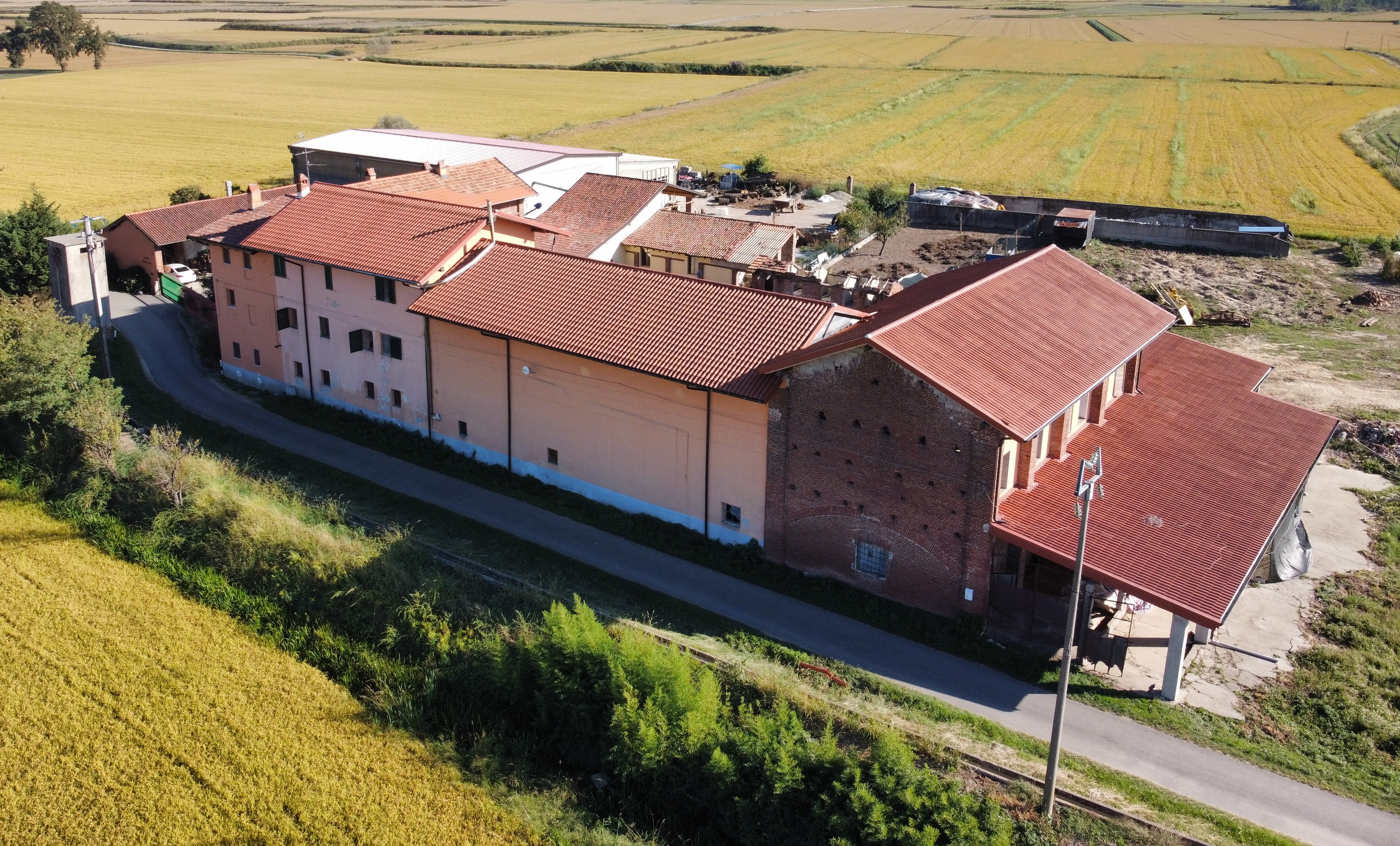
Brusattina seen from north-west (2022)

The estate is located to the west of the town, a few dozen metres after the Belvedere farmhouse, on the Brusattina road of the same name, a municipal road that connects the road to the Church of Garbagna with the SP 97 Mercadante. The Brusattina canal flows nearby.

The name, which Angelo Luigi Stoppa believes to be motivated by a descriptive or functional characteristic of the estate, is sometimes reported with the alternative spelling of Brusatina.

It is a stage of Cascina Baraggiolo (Baraggiolo farmstead) itinerary, part of Vie Verdi del Riso (Green ways of Rice) theme.

==== History ====
The ancient farmhouse building is represented on the 1723 map of the Theresian Cadastre related to Garbagna and Moncucco. From this document, among various details, we learn at that time the road coming from Garbagna ended right at the estate.

The construction of most of the remaining older buildings is estimated to date back to the 19th century.

In the 1940s, the residential building to the north-east was raised from two to three floors.

As of 1961, 13 residents were reported.

On 7 July 2021, the estate, owned by Mario Simeoni and his son Marco, was hit particularly hard by the storm that hit the western Po Valley.

==== Description ====
The complex is arranged around a courtyard. The north-west part has always been used as a barn, while the north-east part is used for civilian purposes and is arranged on three floors. The south part, also on three floors, is used for civilian purposes only on the ground floor. To the west there is a small building used as a stable. Two other prefabricated buildings for the storage of tools and agricultural materials are to the east and outside the main courtyard, built recently.

As of 2009 the building is used for residential and agricultural purposes. The structure condition is fair for the residential part, while the rest appears to be worse preserved.

==== Image gallery ====
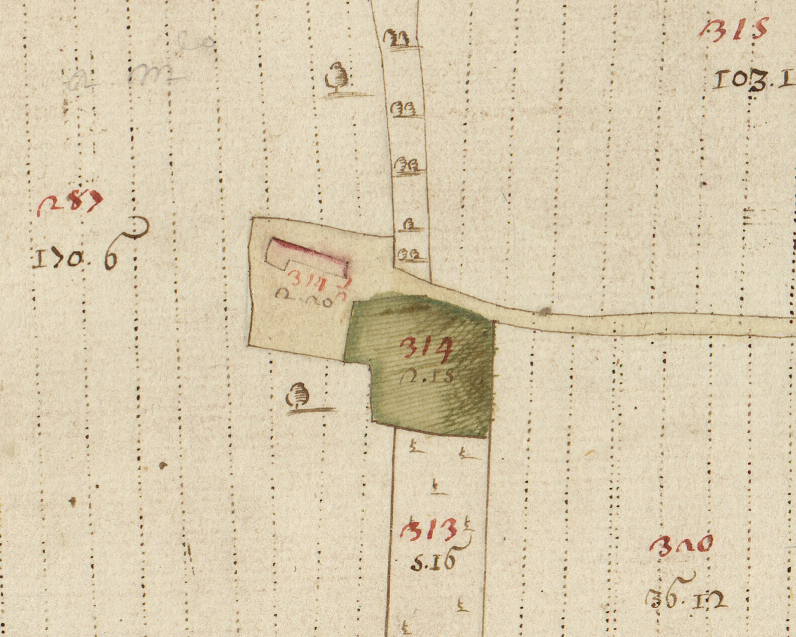
Plan of Theresian Cadastre (1723)

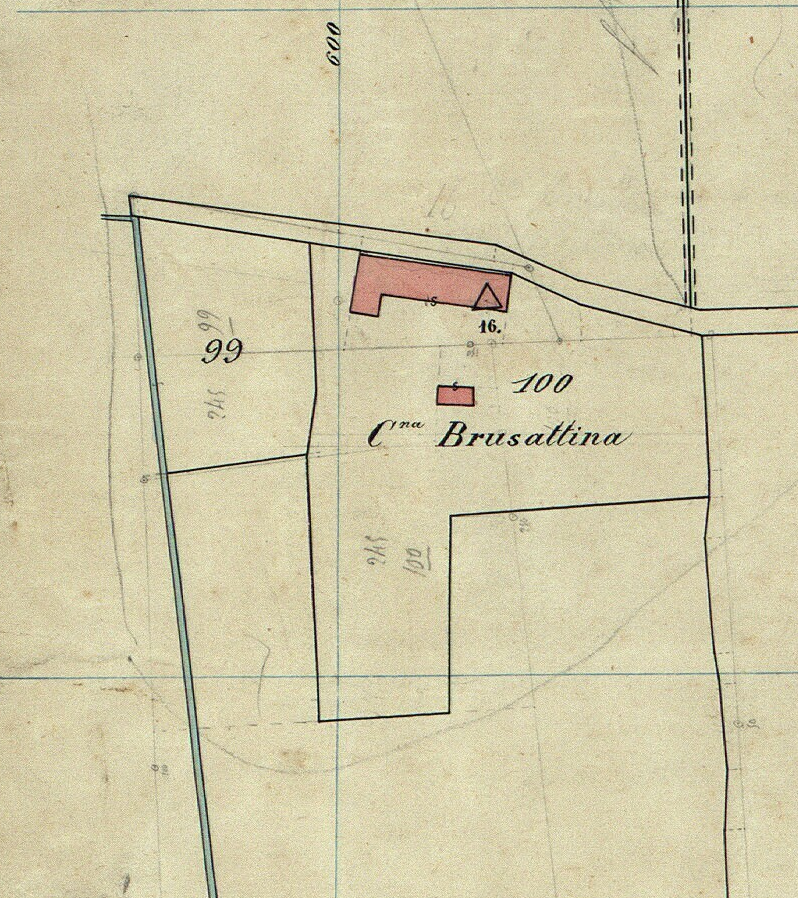
Plan of Rabbini Cadastre (1867)

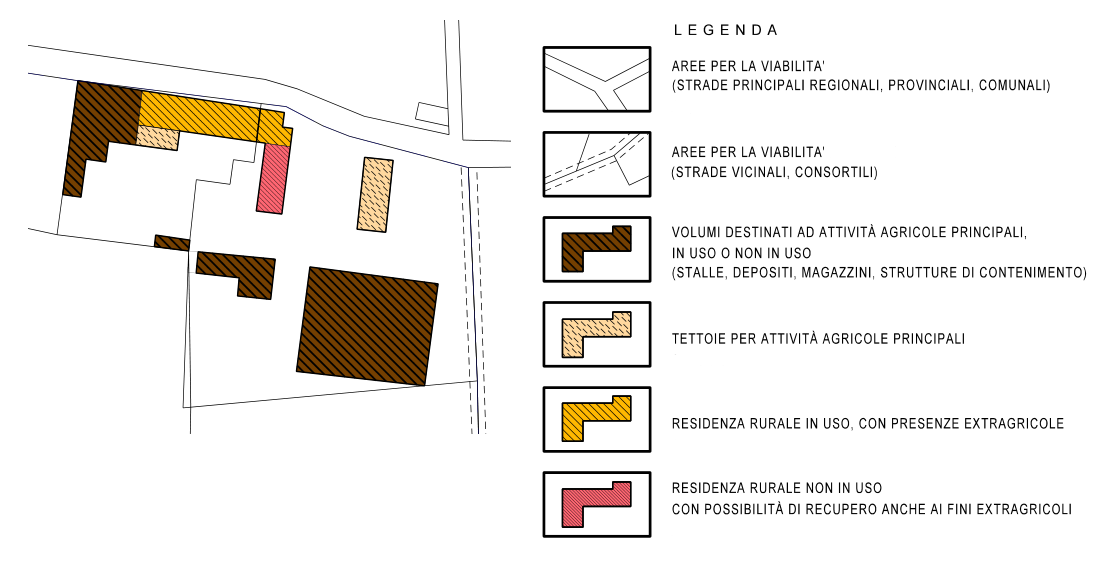
Plan of P.R.G.C. (2003)

=== Cascinetta ===
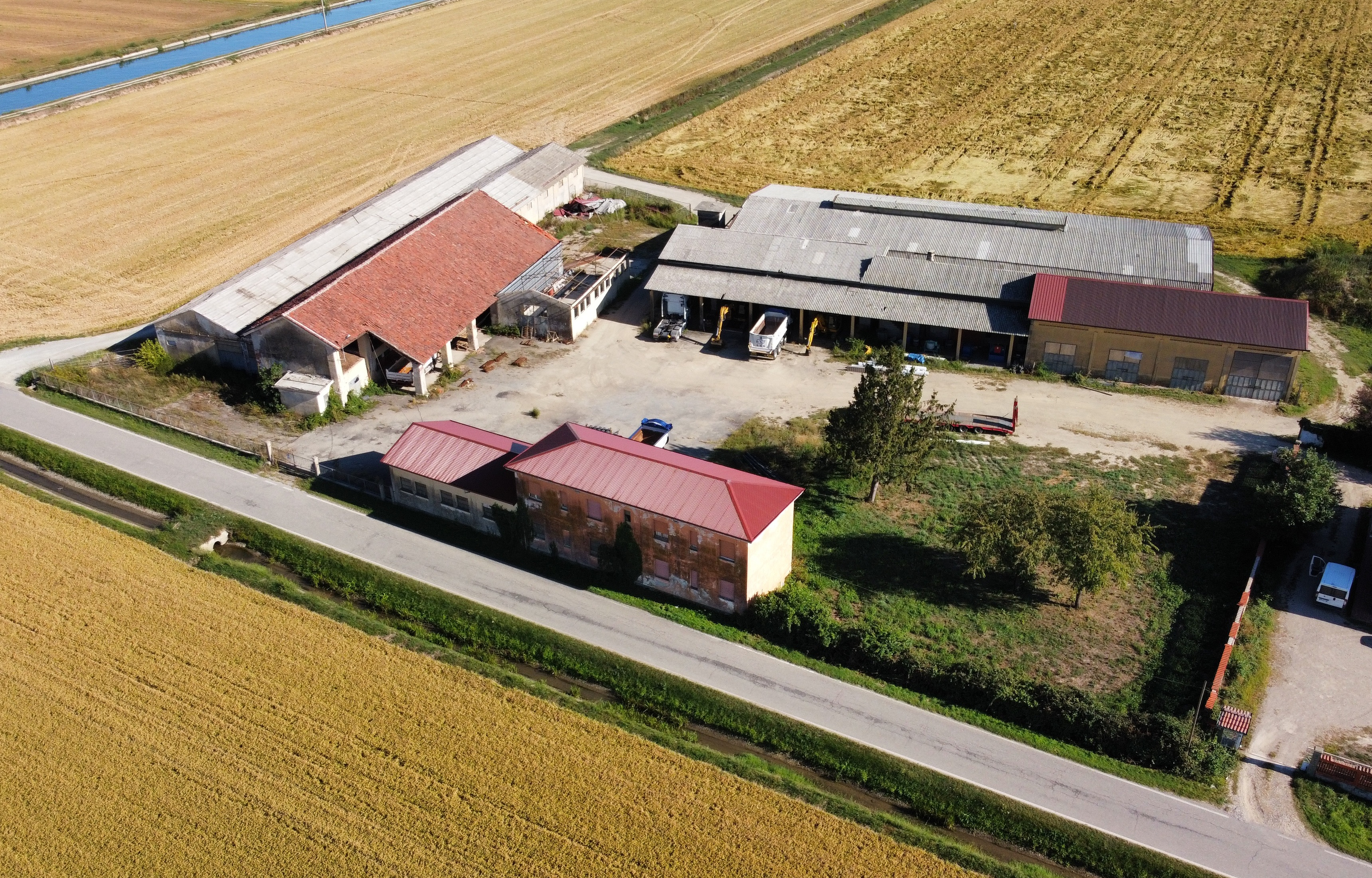
Cascinetta seen from north-west (2022)

It is located on the provincial road that connects Garbagna to Terdobbiate, a few metres from the Quintino Sella canal.

An alternative spelling of the name (which means Small farmstead) is Cassinetta.

It should not be confused with the farmhouses of the same name in the surrounding area: one near Borgolavezzaro, four in the municipality of Novara.

==== History ====
We have information about Cascinetta between the end of the 15th century and the first decades of the following one, in the turbulent period of the fall of the Sforzas, the occupation of Novarese by the French, Swiss and Spanish and finally the establishment of the Farnese marquisate.

In those years, the estate was at the center of a legal dispute involving several generations of litigants. In 1497, Alessandro da Cremona (courtier and confidant of Ludovico Sforza (a.k.a. Ludovico il Moro), as well as ducal chamberlain, ducal hunting officer, podestà, and ducal commissioner of Vigevano)

he leased a meadow and an arable field from the Cacciapiatti family for nine years, totaling 26 moggia, in the Buzoletto area of Garbagna, known as Cassinetta, for a rent of 916 lire per year, promising to carry out work, the value of which would be deducted from the rent itself. Once the work was completed, however, he was forced to leave the Duchy of Milan, going into exile. The Cacciapiattis immediately leased the properties back to others, whereupon the Da Cremona brothers, Alessandro's heirs, sued them for repossession or compensation. The matter was resolved in 1522, when the Cacciapiattis agreed to cede the properties to the Da Cremonas, reserving the right to redeem them for 1300 imperial lire within six years. The Da Cremonas immediately leased the property back to them, at a rent of 65 lire per year, with the stipulation that if they failed to pay for one year, the Cacciapiattis would be removed. A few years later, in 1526, the property passed to Antonia, the Da Cremonas' sister, as part of her dowry. However, the Cacciapiattis had to wait another two decades to free themselves from the constraint: in 1545, Antonia, now a widow, resold the Cascinetta meadow and fields to Giovanni Battista Cacciapiatti for 1300 lire.

The ancient building is represented on the 1723 Theresian Cadastre map relating to Buzzoletto and Calzavacca, specifically as a dependency of the former.

A reference is contained in the Geographical-postal dictionary of 1863.

==== Description ====
The complex consists of three buildings built around a large courtyard: the stable to the east was converted into a warehouse in the late 1900s; the structure to the south serves as a shelter for tools and agricultural vehicles; the two-story building to the north, dating back to the early 1900s, is used for civilian purposes.

As of 2003, the state of conservation of the residential building is good, while the agricultural part is poor.

==== Image gallery ====
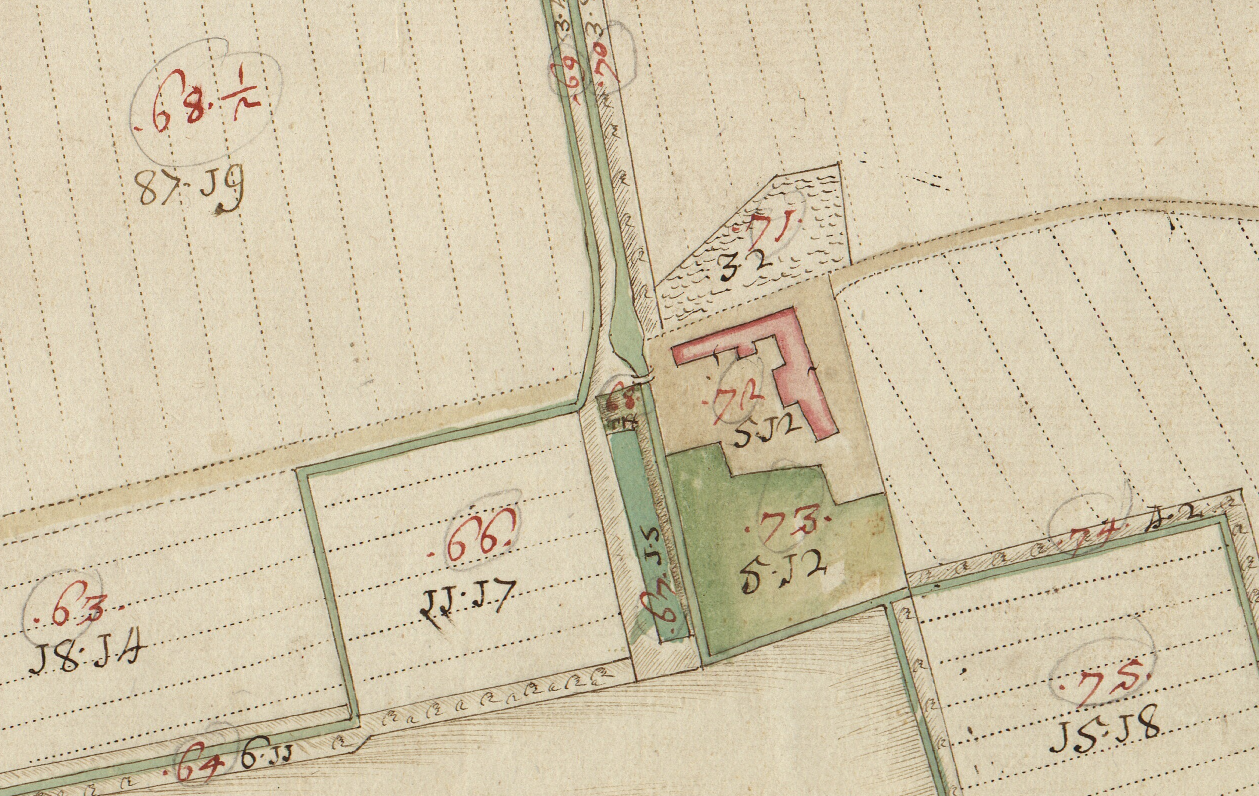
Plan of Theresian Cadastre (1723)

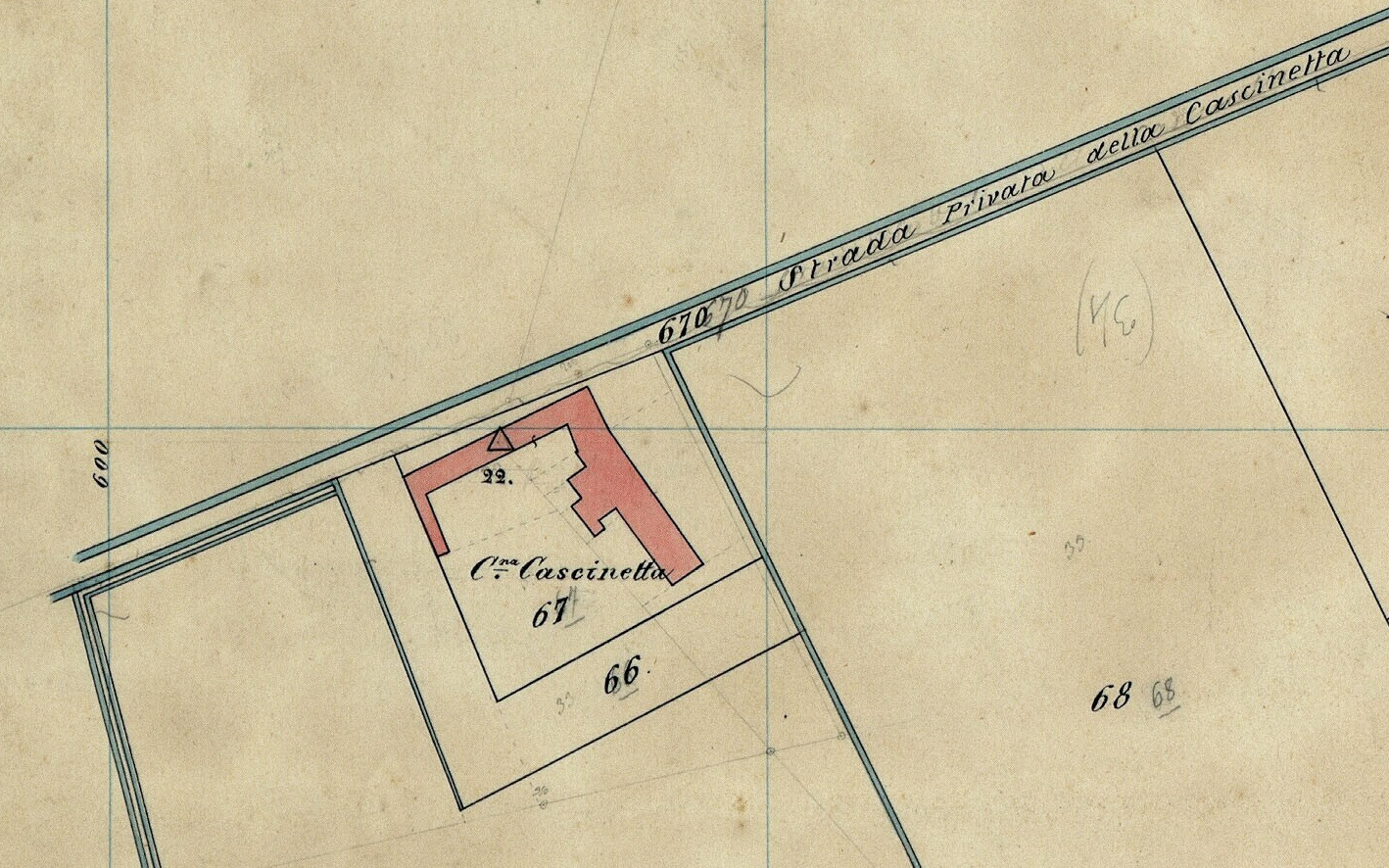
Plan of Rabbini Cadastre (1867)

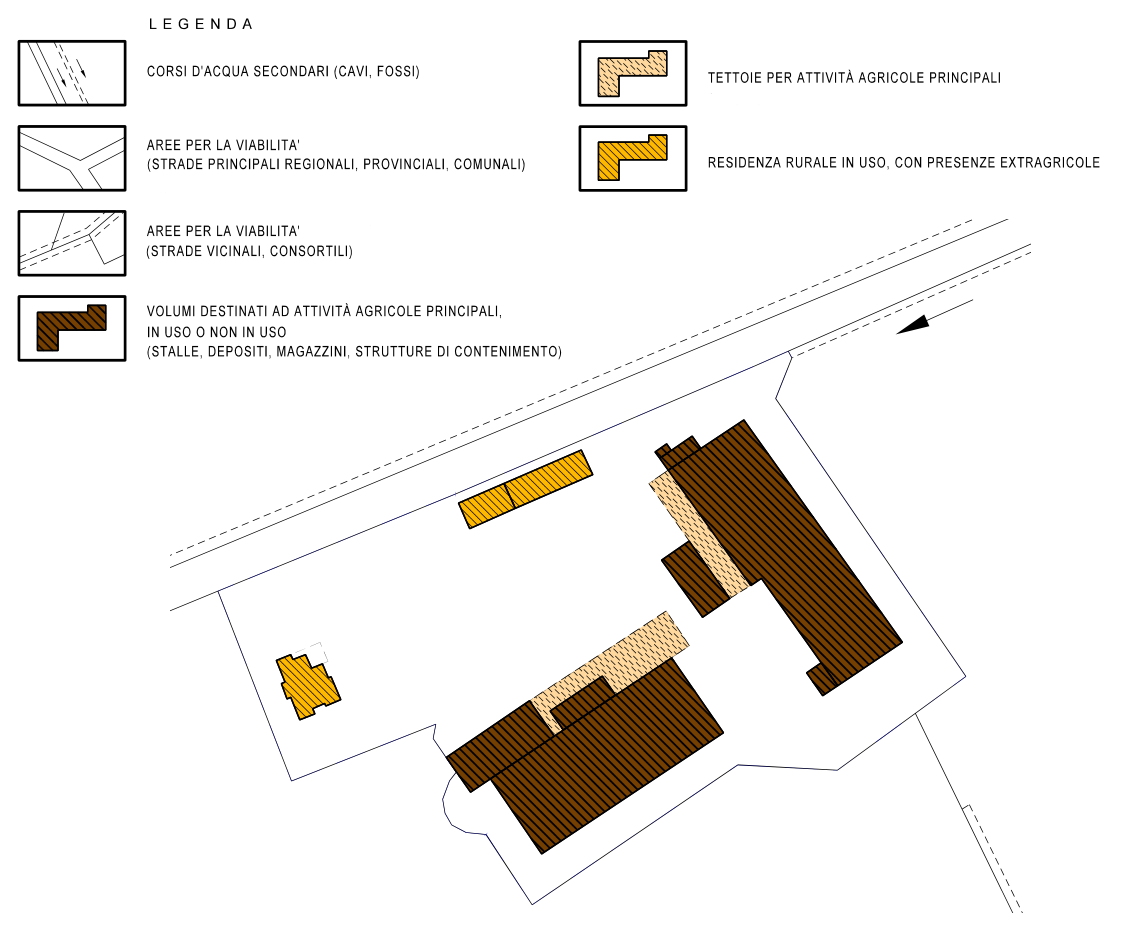
Plan of P.R.G.C. (2003)

=== Marijna ===
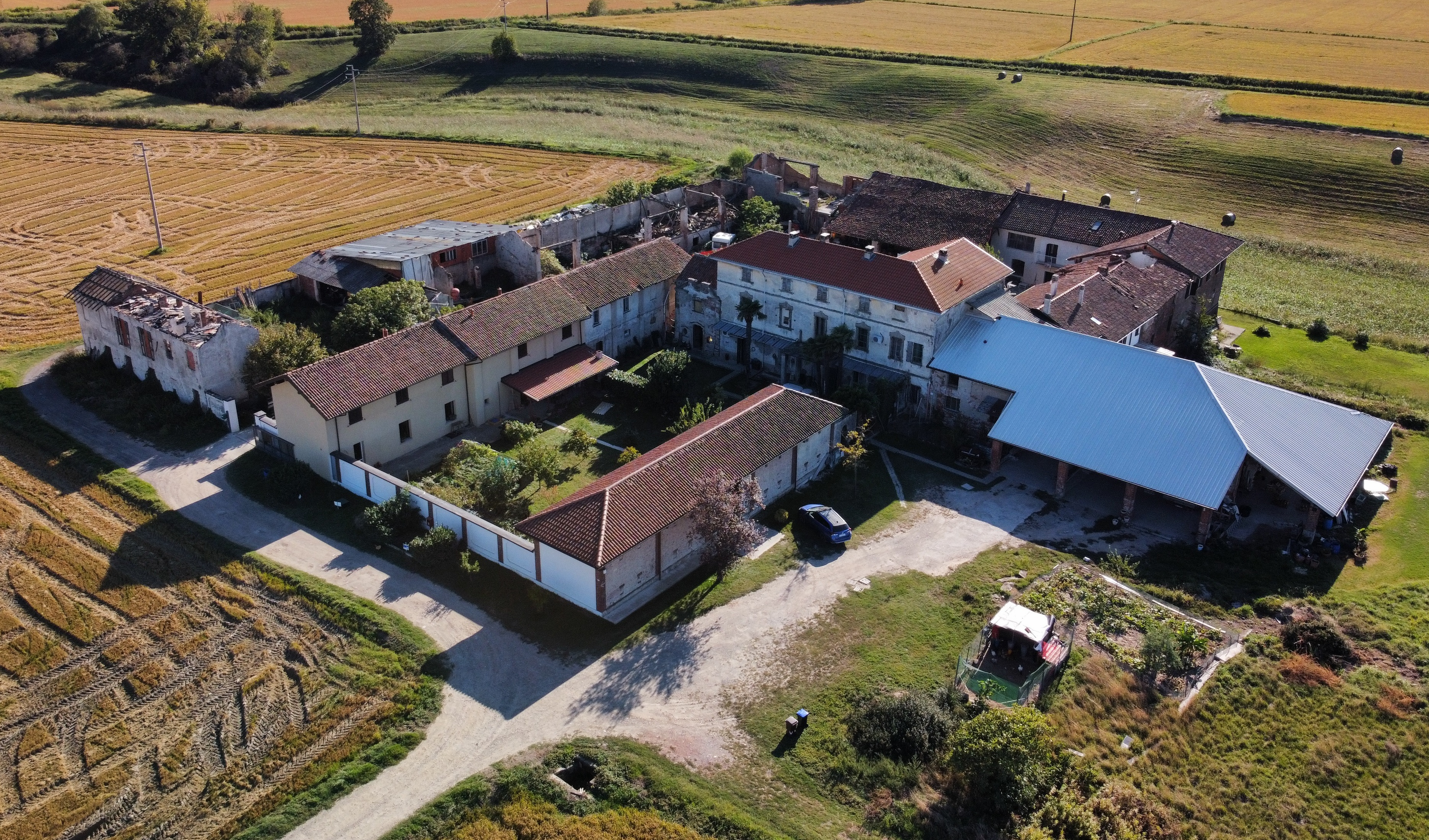
Marijna seen from north-east (2022)

The estate is located at the western edge of the municipal territory, in the center of the Novara-Vespolate Terrace. Nearby is the local road known as Marijna road, the final stretch of Brusattina road, which connects Via alla Chiesa of Garbagna with the S.P. 97 Mercadante. The Marijna stream and the Rì stream flow nearby. The estate is also located at the top of the Arbogna Valley, whose stream flows nearby.

The name, which Angelo Luigi Stoppa believes derived from an ancient family of owners who disappeared and are now forgotten, is also reported with spellings Mariina, Marina and Marajna.

Various activities of touristic valorization of the landscape heritage concern it: it is a stage of Cascina Baraggiolo (Baraggiolo farmstead) itinerary (part of Vie Verdi del Riso (Green ways of Rice) theme) and the path Tappa 00 sud of C.A.I. Novara runs along a part of the Marijna road.

==== History ====
===== Modern age =====
A reference to the estate is contained in the land registry of Charles V, in the document relating to ecclesiastical assets dated 1588: a piece of land in Olengo, belonging to the church of San Pietro of Novara and administered by an unspecified priest of the Marijna.

At the time of the Spanish domination of the Duchy of Milan, the estate belonged to the Caccia family of Novara: in a proclamation (grida) of 11 January 1696 it was declared part of the territory of Garbagna and property of Donna Clara Conti Caxa and her son Marquis Don Sebastiano Caxa; in an edict of Charles Emmanuel III of Savoy dated 11 March 1739 it belonged to the Marquis Giuseppe Caccia.

The representation of the estate on the map of the Theresian Cadastre of 1723 relating to Garbagna and Moncucco therefore dates back to the period of the Caccia property.

It is assumed that the current building was built in the 18th century, according to the inscription present in the oldest part, reporting the date 1779.

At the end of the century the property passed to two Novara personalities who emerged during the French occupation and the following Department of Agogna: Giovanni Battista Cavalli (mayor of Novara in 1790 and 1798) and the Dominican friar and notary Giacinto Patrioli (provincial and departmental treasurer, mayor in 1799 (Note: The Dominican friar Giacinto Patrioli is first known for his work as a notary and provincial treasurer of Novara in the last decade of the 18th century, an activity attested by numerous documents preserved in the State Archives of Novara. In the same decade, he was among the first Novara clerics to embrace the ideas of the French Enlightenment and Revolution, joining the first municipal administration in 1798 and becoming its president (mayor) the following year. His figure was disliked by several figures of the time: the notary Giuseppe Garone called him a Dominican who had abandoned those novelties, while the historian Carlo Francesco Frasconi labeled him a vir sane irreligiosus (absolutely irreligious man). He also held the position of treasurer during the Department of Agogna, at least in the two-year period 1800-1801.)). A detail left to us by a decree of the Department of Agogna: in 1801, as the Novara administration had to cover the costs of military subsistence, 30 sacks of rice were requisitioned from Cavalli (among other landowners and tenants in the surrounding area), which were later repaid to him for the sum of 68 Milanese lire each by the Departmental Cashier.

===== Contemporary age =====
In the following decades, the owner was Francesco Antonio Cavalli, remembered for being the protagonist of a dispute that received widespread attention in the courts and became a model: having deliberately diverted the course of the Ri stream, which flowed on his property, he deprived the lands downstream of its course of irrigation water, including those belonging to the parish of Garbagna, the benefice of the curate Giovanni De Paoli. The priest, supported by the entire community of the village, took the matter to court, which ultimately ruled in favor of Cavalli, who had no right to deprive the lands downstream of water.

The events of the Second World War also involved Marijna: the partisan Ladino Marangon, born in 1923, who was a battalion commander in the Corpo Volontari della Libertà (Volunteers of Freedom Corp), lived there, falling in combat at Marano Ticino in November 1944. (Note: Ladino Marangon was born in Contarina (Rovigo), son of Giovanni and Maria Pasqua Beretta. In April 1944, he joined the partisan ranks under the nom de guerre Barba, rising to command the 10th Rocco Brigade in the 2nd Garibaldi Division Redi, and at the same time assisting Taras (Nello Sartoris) in managing the Volante Azzurra Battalion. After seven months of guerrilla warfare, he fell in combat on November 17, 1944, at the end of a sabotage operation on an enemy column coming from Arona, which was then transporting fuel. The next day, some partisans removed his body and took it to Mezzomerico, whereupon all trace of him disappeared. Over the years, several searches for his burial have been carried out in neighboring municipalities, and anyone with information is encouraged to share it. In 1957 he was awarded the bronze medal for military valor in memoriam and, decades later, his figure has been remembered several times during the celebrations of April 25th in Marano Ticino. He had an older brother, Arturo, born in 1920 in Contarina and also living in Garbagna. Arturo was a partisan in the Osella Brigade, but after being captured in combat in February 1945, he was never heard from again. Ernesto Colli, remembering the fallen of Garbagna in the two world wars, he cites him as Livino.).

A German radio station was also installed near the farmhouse, at the southern end of a seven-kilometer-long telephone line that ran from Cameri. The line was guarded by numerous guard posts, with civilian guards from the territories they passed through, who had been conscripted by the German occupiers and were paid a daily allowance of 30 lire as compensation for days of lost work. The line was the target of several sabotage actions by partisan forces.

In 1951 it had 39 inhabitants. The previous and subsequent censuses do not provide any details.

In the second half of the 20th century, a small stone sarcophagus (0.40 m x 1.25 m) was found near the Marijna farmhouse during renovations to the keep. The discovery of the sarcophagus, now privately held, is important evidence of human presence during Late Antiquity.

==== Description ====
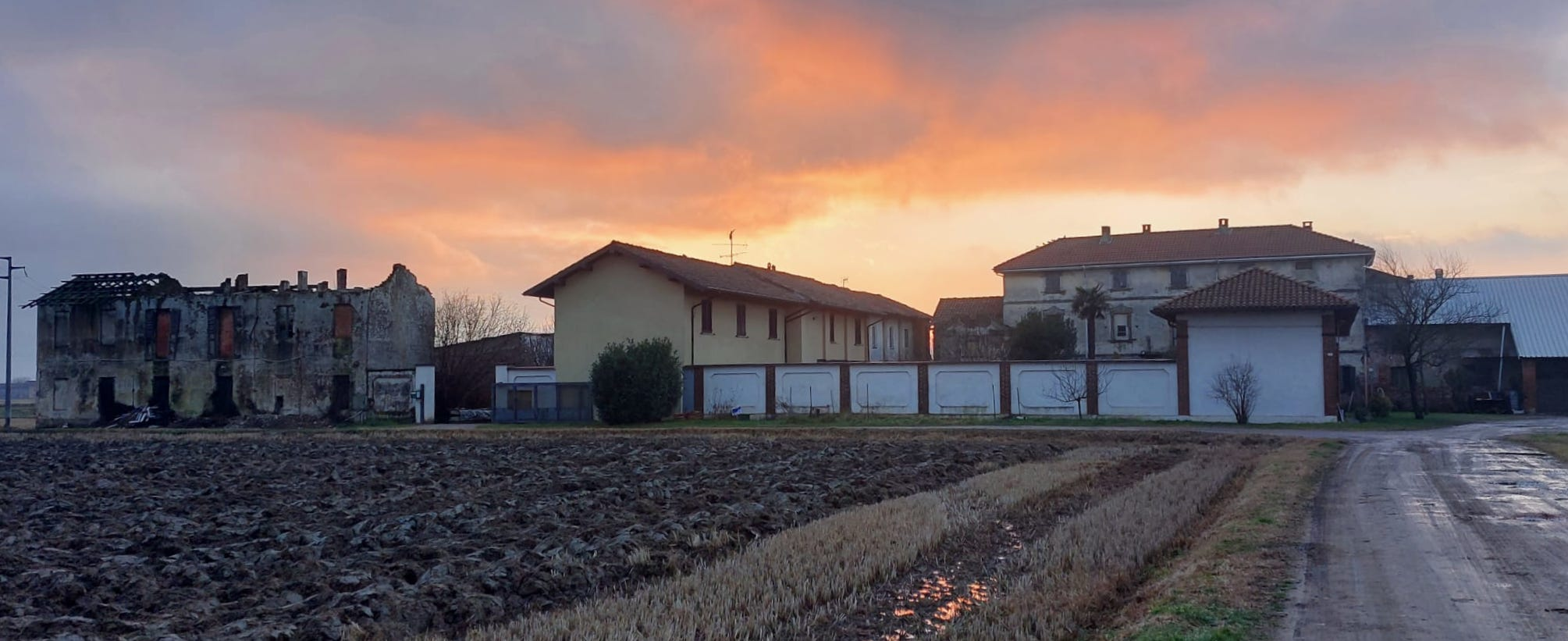
View at sunset, from the east

The main building is arranged around a rectangular courtyard. The two-story eastern wing is used for residential purposes and is flanked by an oratory. The western and southern wings serve as warehouses, but are currently underutilized. The northern wing is partially used as a cellar and contains an old wooden mill. Also to the north, but externally, is a large tile-roofed shed used for agricultural tools and machinery.

Another building located in front of the residential building is used as a warehouse.

As of 2009, the older buildings were neglected, while the residential buildings were in fair condition. The internal oratory, however, was well-maintained and in good condition.

==== Oratory ====
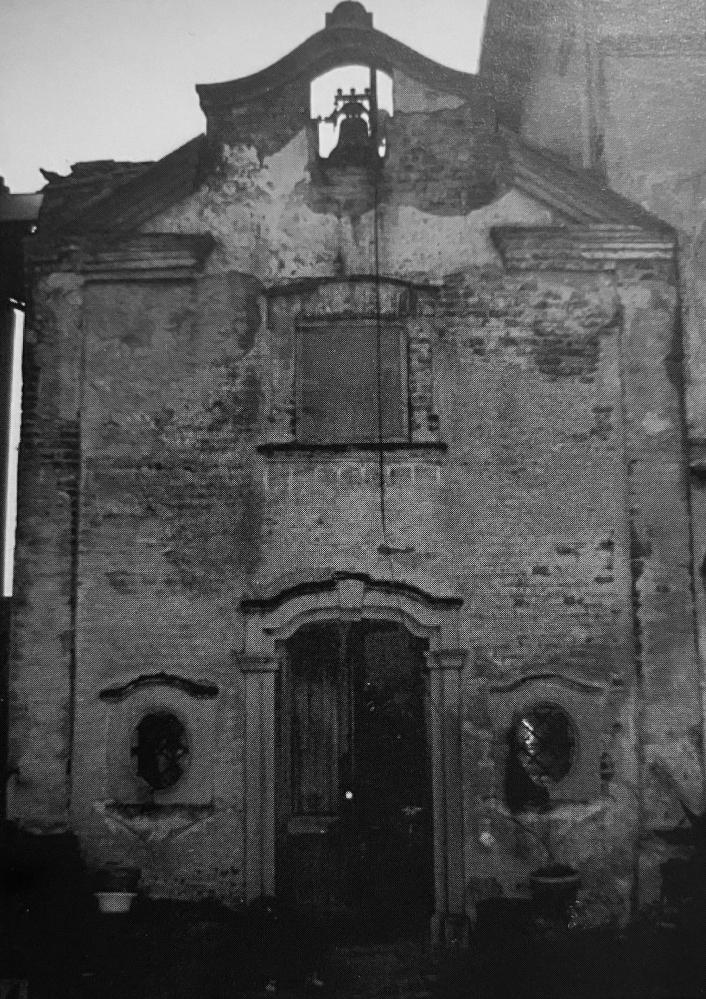
Facade of the oratory

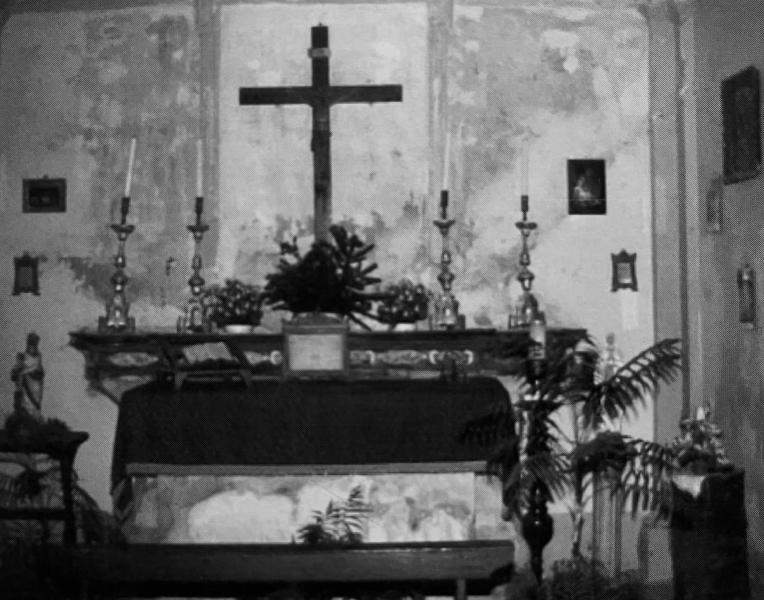
Altar of the oratory

Among the civil and agricultural buildings is the oratory dedicated to Saint James the Apostle and Saint Charles, built in 1783 in good shape and well equipped with furnishings.

In 1823, Bishop Giuseppe Morozzo visited the church on a pastoral visit. The visit report provides a detailed description: its façade faced east and had three windows; inside, there was a single altar, with a step above and a marble predella; to the sides of the altar were two storage rooms, used for flowers and furnishings. The only negative aspect was the storage room on the south side, used for storing everything, as if it were a living room or a kitchen.

In 2008 the pediment with bell gable had collapsed.

==== Image gallery ====
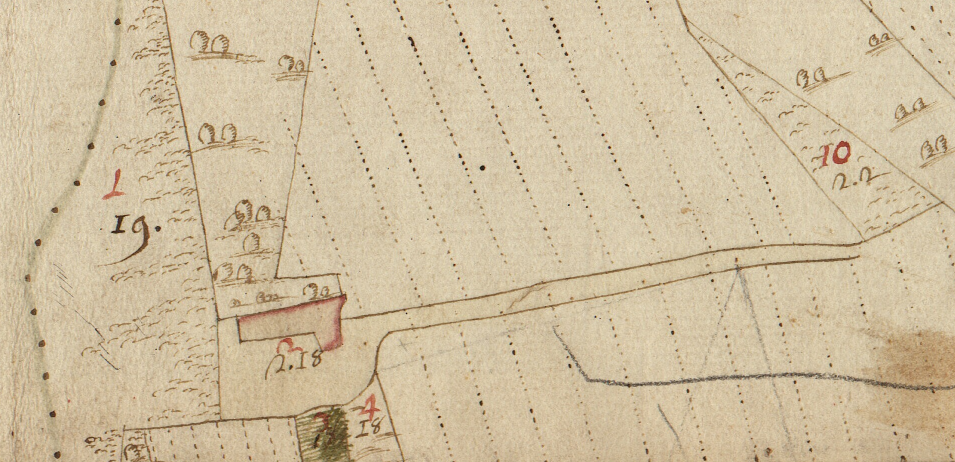
Plan of Theresian Cadastre (1723)

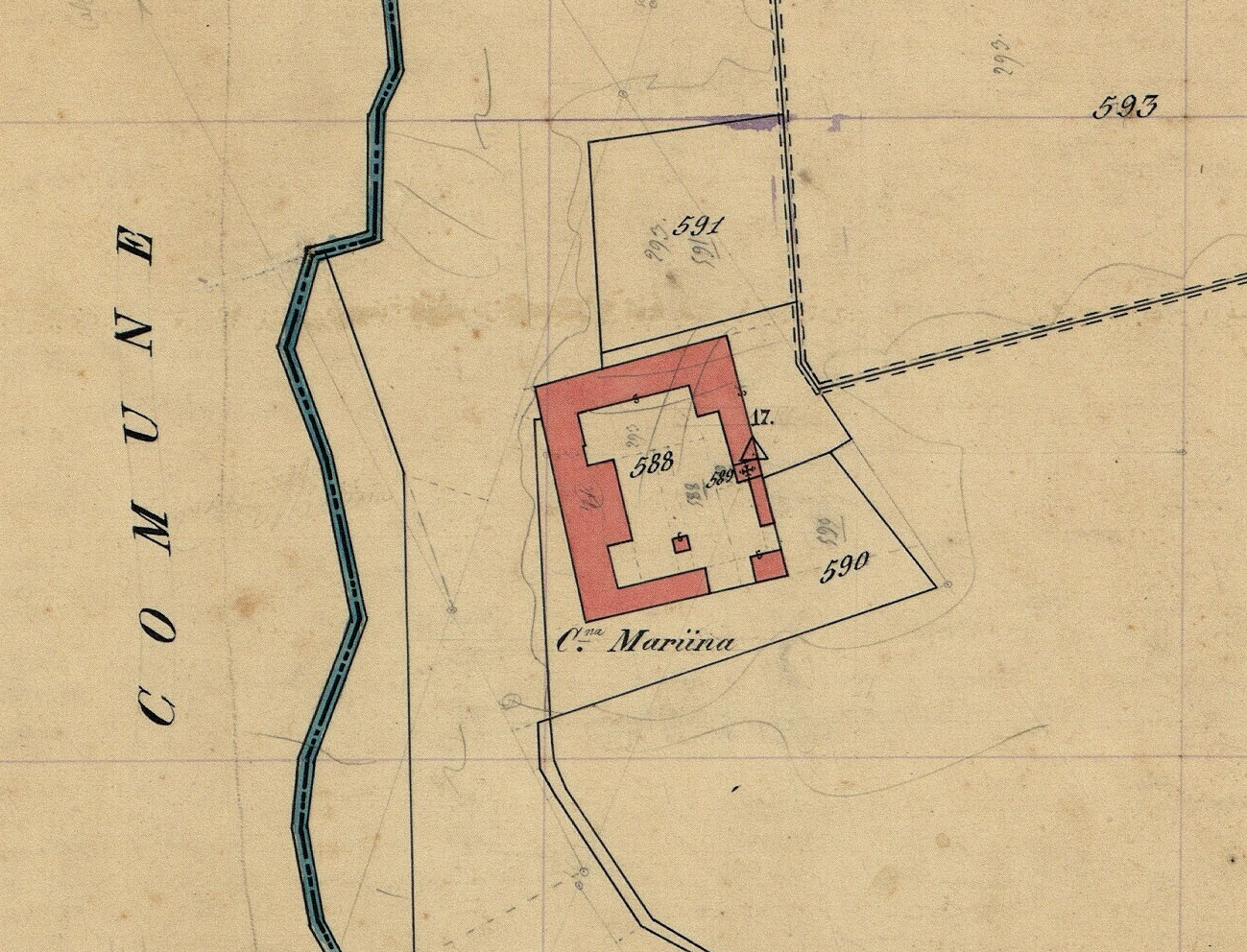
Plan of Rabbini Cadastre (1867)

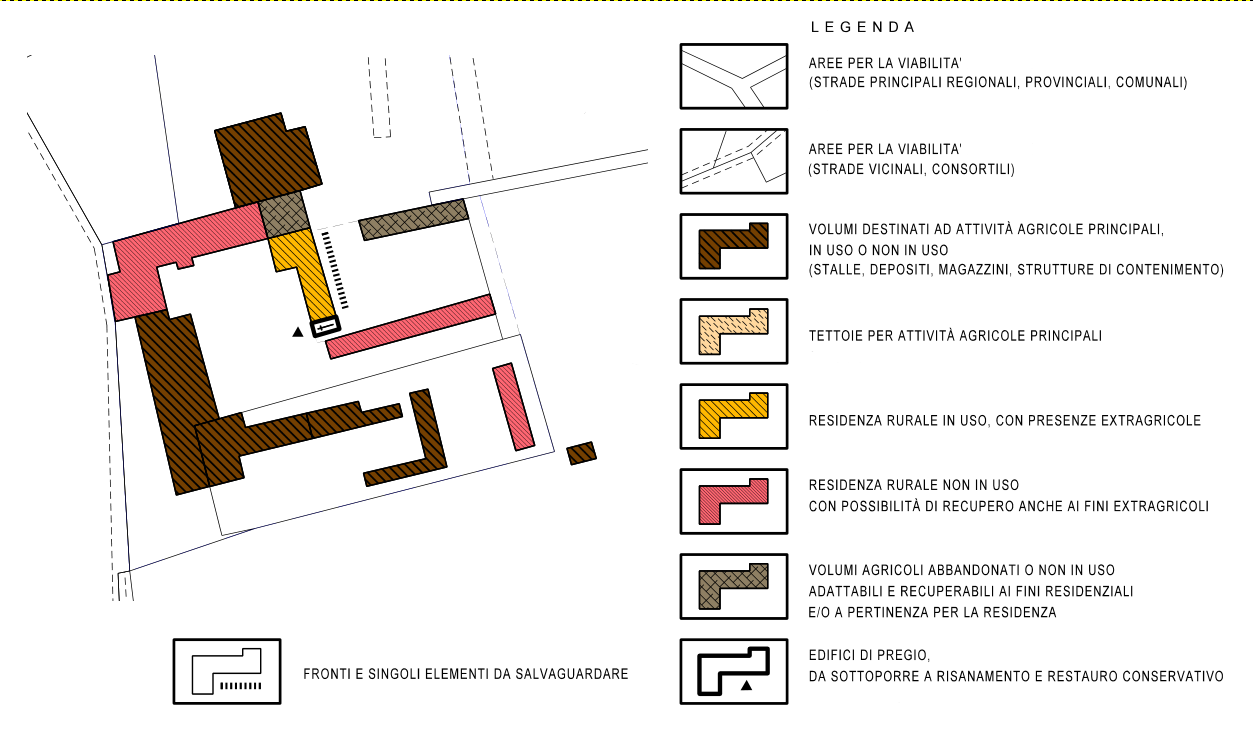
Plan of P.R.G.C. (2003)

=== Borghetto ===
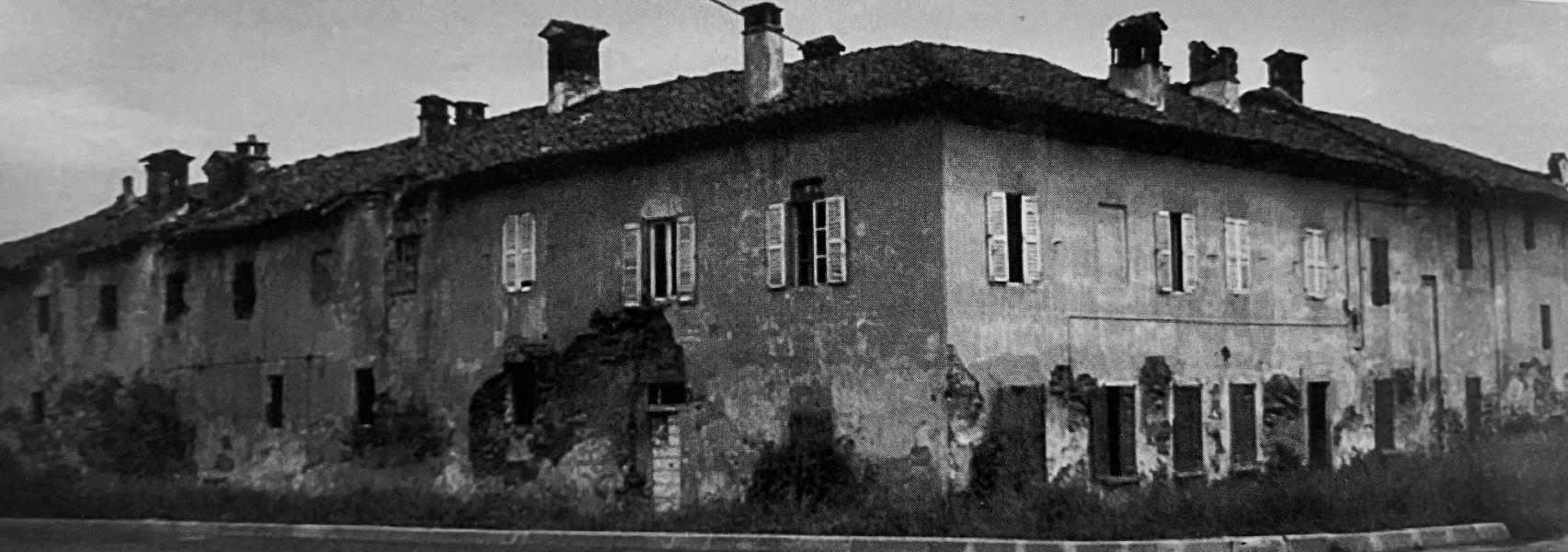
Old farmstead Borghetto, photographed by the local physician and art historian Giacomo Perolini

It is located on the road that leads from the village to the train stop.

It is bordered by the Borghetto fountain to the west (covered along the entire length of the town), the cavo del Comune di Vespolate to the east and the cavo dell'Ospedale Maggiore of Novara.

==== History ====
It was part of an estate of over a thousand perches (almost 70 hectares) which belonged for centuries to the Ospedale Maggiore of Novara.

It is present on the map of the Theresian Cadastre of 1723 relating to Garbagna and Moncucco.

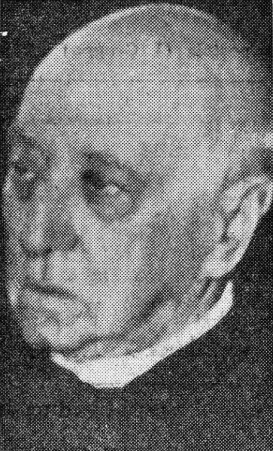
Lino Cassani, co-author of the monograph on Garbagna, spent his childhood in Borghetto

In the 19th century, following the Napoleonic wars, the Sardinian government forced the Hospital of Charity of Novara to sell the estate, which was divided between several private individuals, together with other properties.

During the 19th century, the Cassani family was also a tenant, and in 1877 they introduced the breeding of Bergamina breed cows to Garbagna. Lino Cassani, co-author of the 1948 monograph on Garbagna, he spent his childhood in Borghetto, recounting that even during his stay valuable 18th-century paintings, probably of the Valsesian school, were visible near a window facing the parish church.

Since the 1950s, the Fregonara family has operated the Borghetto farm, classified as a large farm. Over the years, Eugenio and Giovanni Fregonara have received several provincial and national awards for their high productivity and the quality of their rice seeds.

In the modernization activities of the estate during the 1950s, the expansion of the buildings to the east of the municipal road saw the involvement of the renowned Gregotti architectural studio (Vittorio Gregotti, Lodovico Meneghetti and Giotto Stoppino). Specifically, among the first creations of the young studio were the villa for the farmer (1953) and the new machinery shed (1954). (Note: The architect Vittorio Gregotti was a relative of the owner of the Borghetto estate, Carmen Magni Gregotti, mentioned in the next paragraph. However, no documents attesting to their precise relationship have yet been found.)

In the 70s the owner Carmen Magni, daughter of the mayor of the town Francesco Magni, donated part of the estate to the municipality for the construction of a sports centre: an area of 13000 m^{2} on which the "Mario Costadone" Sports Centre was built in the early 1980s.

==== Description ====
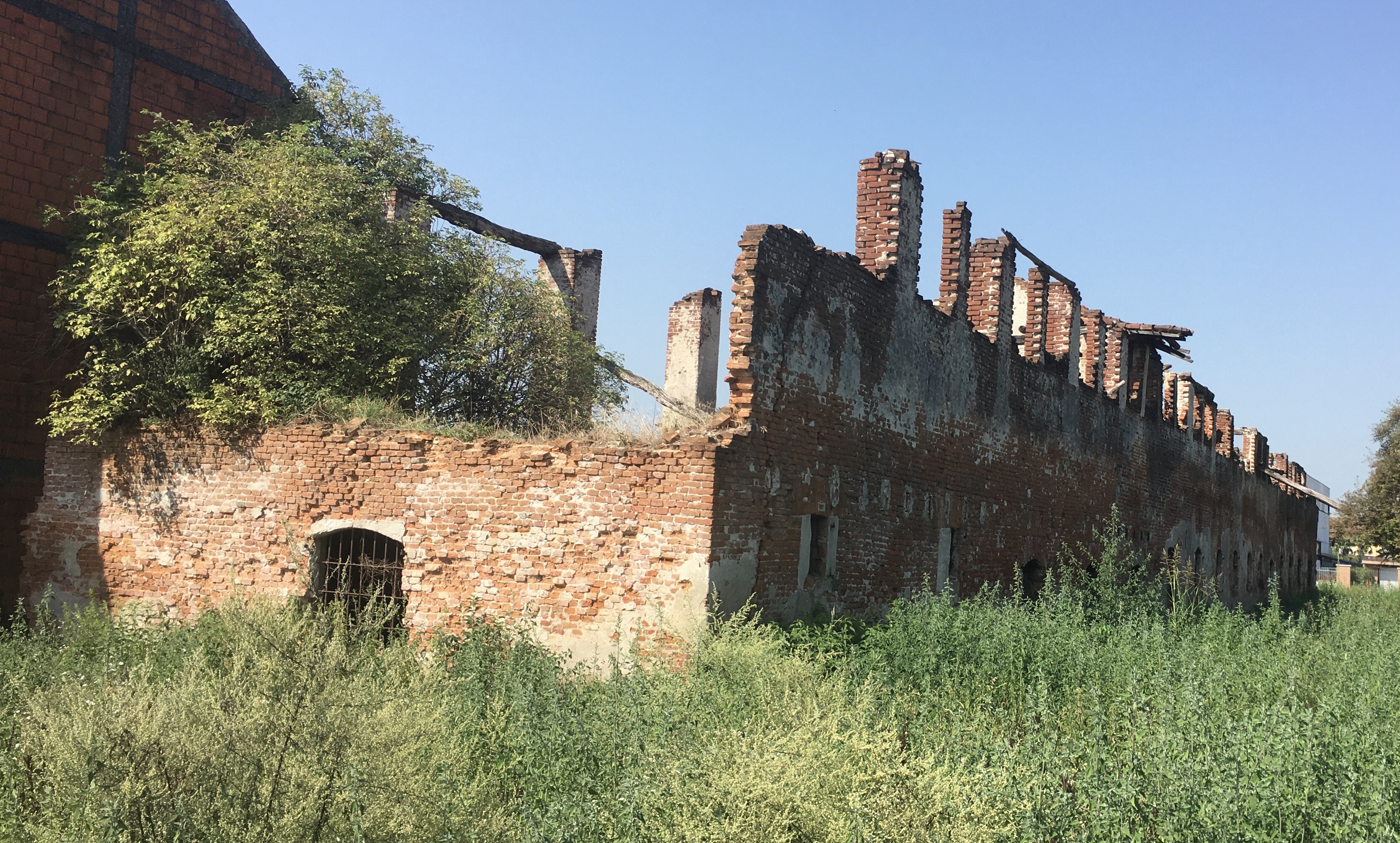
Ruins of the ancient stables

As of 2021 the main body of the old farmhouse is destroyed, only a ruined and abandoned part remains, whose stable features columns considered to be of significant historical value. There have been several attempts to launch recovery programs, programs that were also proposed during the electoral campaigns for the municipal elections.

==== Image gallery ====
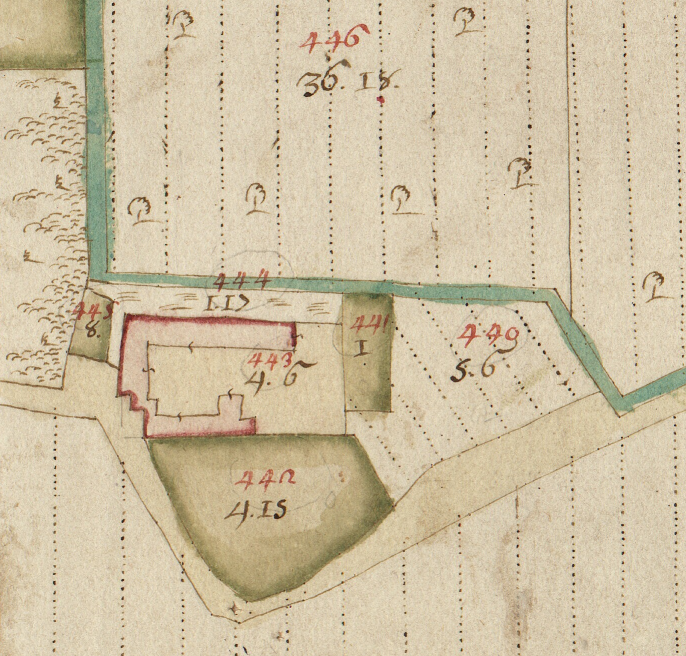
Plan of Theresian Cadastre (1723)

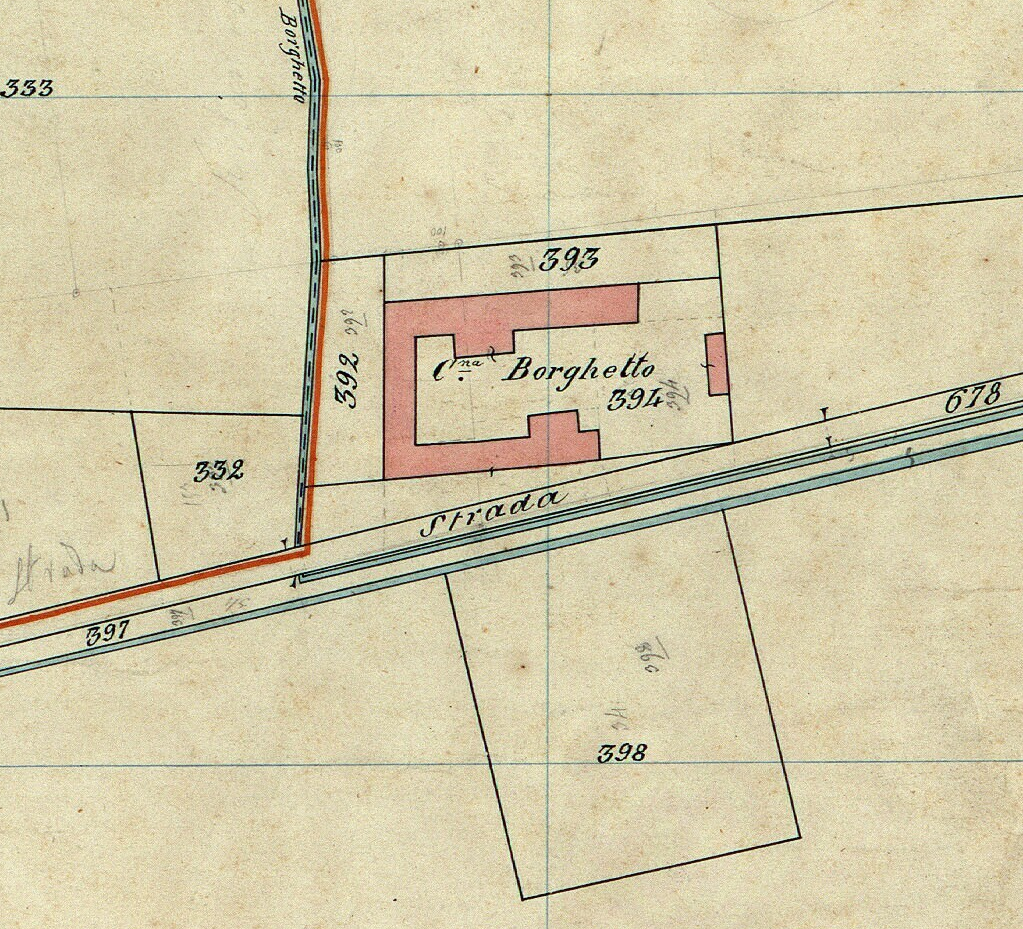
Plan of Rabbini Cadastre (1867)

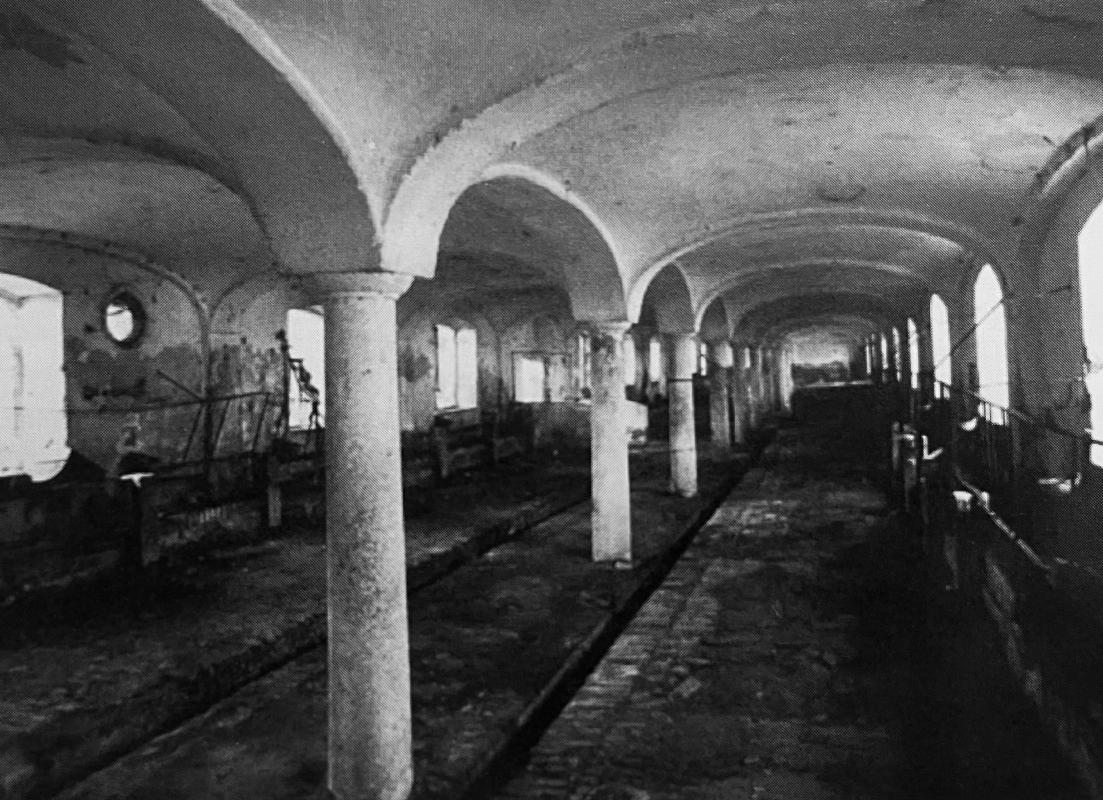
Interno delle antiche stalle

=== Buzzoletto Nuovo ===
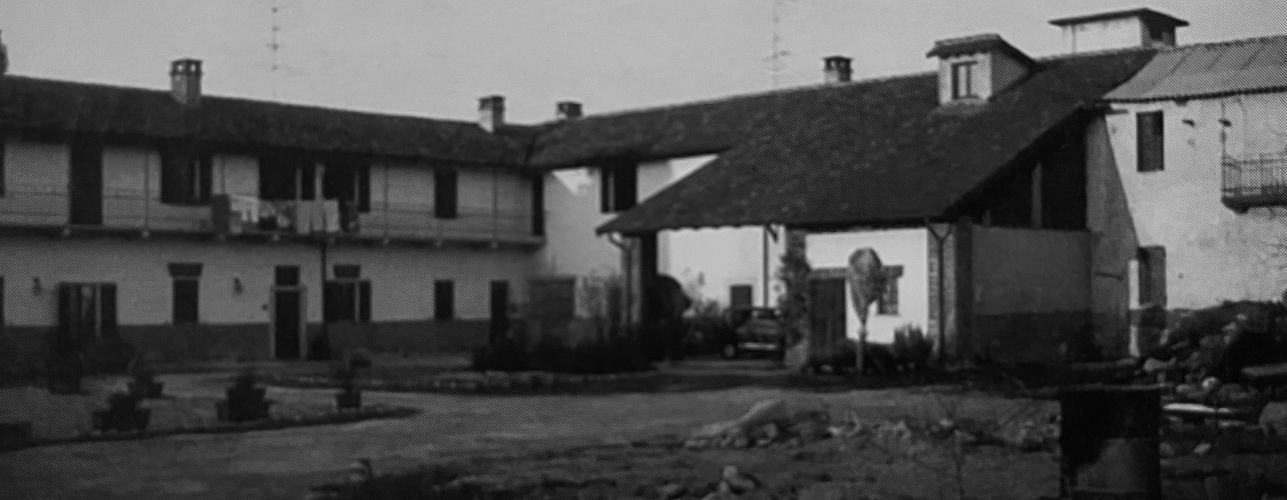
View from the courtyard of Buzzoletto Nuovo

The estate is located on the road that connects Olengo and Terdobbiate and is bordered at the back by the Buzzoletto spring. A few dozen meters away are the Quintino Sella Canal to the west, the Gambalotta spring to the east and the Buzzoletto Vecchio farmstead to the south.

==== History ====
The ancient buildings are represented on the 1723 Theresian Cadastre map relating to Buzzoletto and Calzavacca.

A textual reference that distinguishes it from Buzzoletto Vecchio dates back to 1850, when the administrators of the Bellini inheritance published the announcement of a 12-year lease of the property Buzzoletto dissopra (upper Buzzoletto), located on lands in Trecate, Garbagna, Olengo and Buzzoletto.

A reference to the current name Buzzoletto Nuovo (which means New Buzzoletto) dates back to 1863 in the Geographical-Postal Dictionary of Italy.

From the censuses we obtain the number of inhabitants after the Second World War: 60 in 1951, 50 in 1961 and 34 in 1971.

==== Description ====
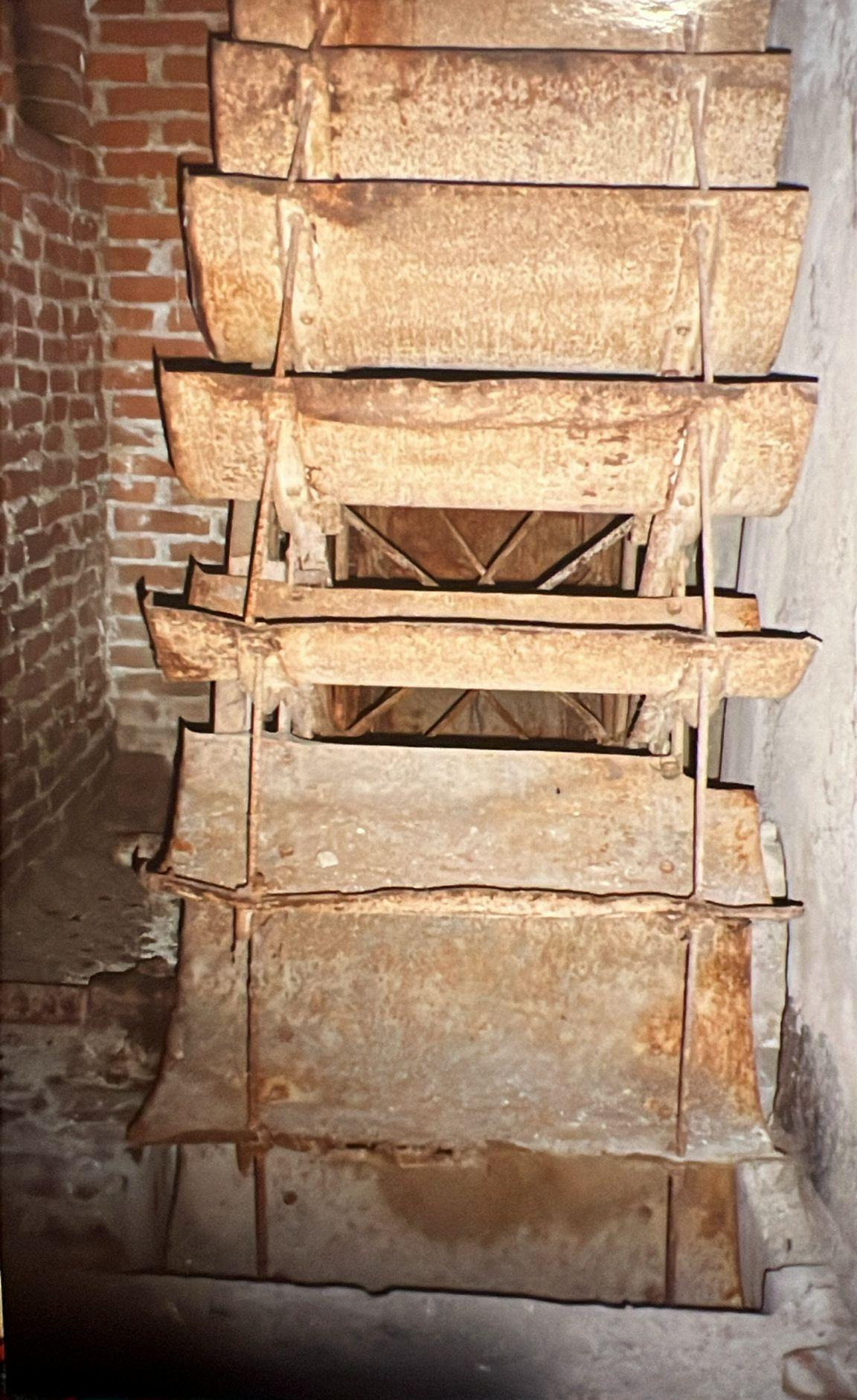
Mill wheel

In the southern sector, there are several buildings dating back to the early 20th century, now used as shelters for agricultural machinery. Many of these, especially the shed on the west side, are unsafe.

The northern sector consists of residential buildings dating back to the 19th century, arranged around a courtyard divided by a masonry partition. An old sundial is located on the partition, beneath a gabled roof, of historical importance but now difficult to distinguish. The buildings to the west and east of the partition were renovated in the 1960s; the eastern section was renovated in the 1990s.

As of 2003, the complex, used for both residential and agricultural purposes, is reasonably well preserved in the northern part, while the southern sector is in very poor condition.

==== Image gallery ====
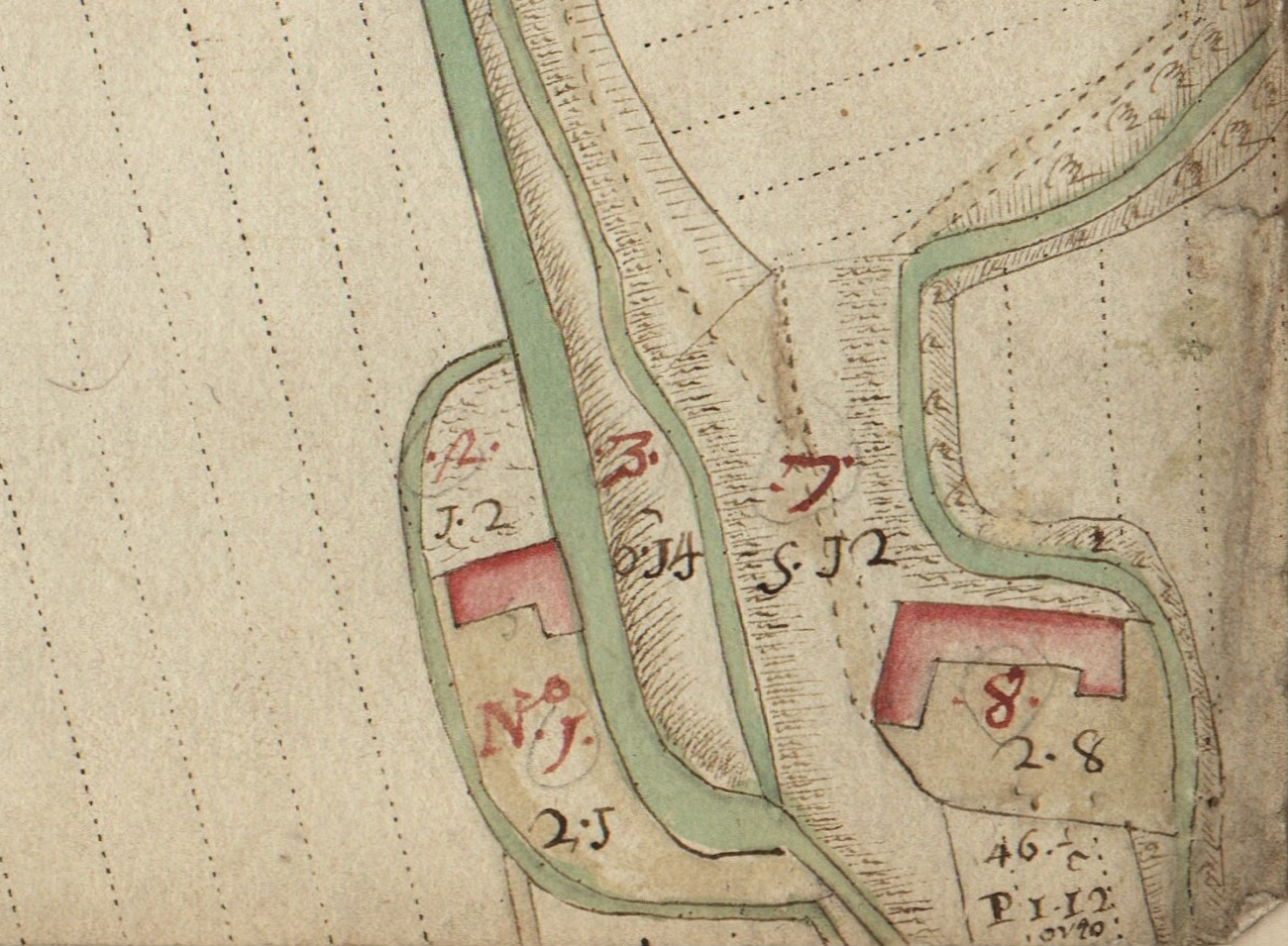
Plan of Theresian Cadastre (1723)

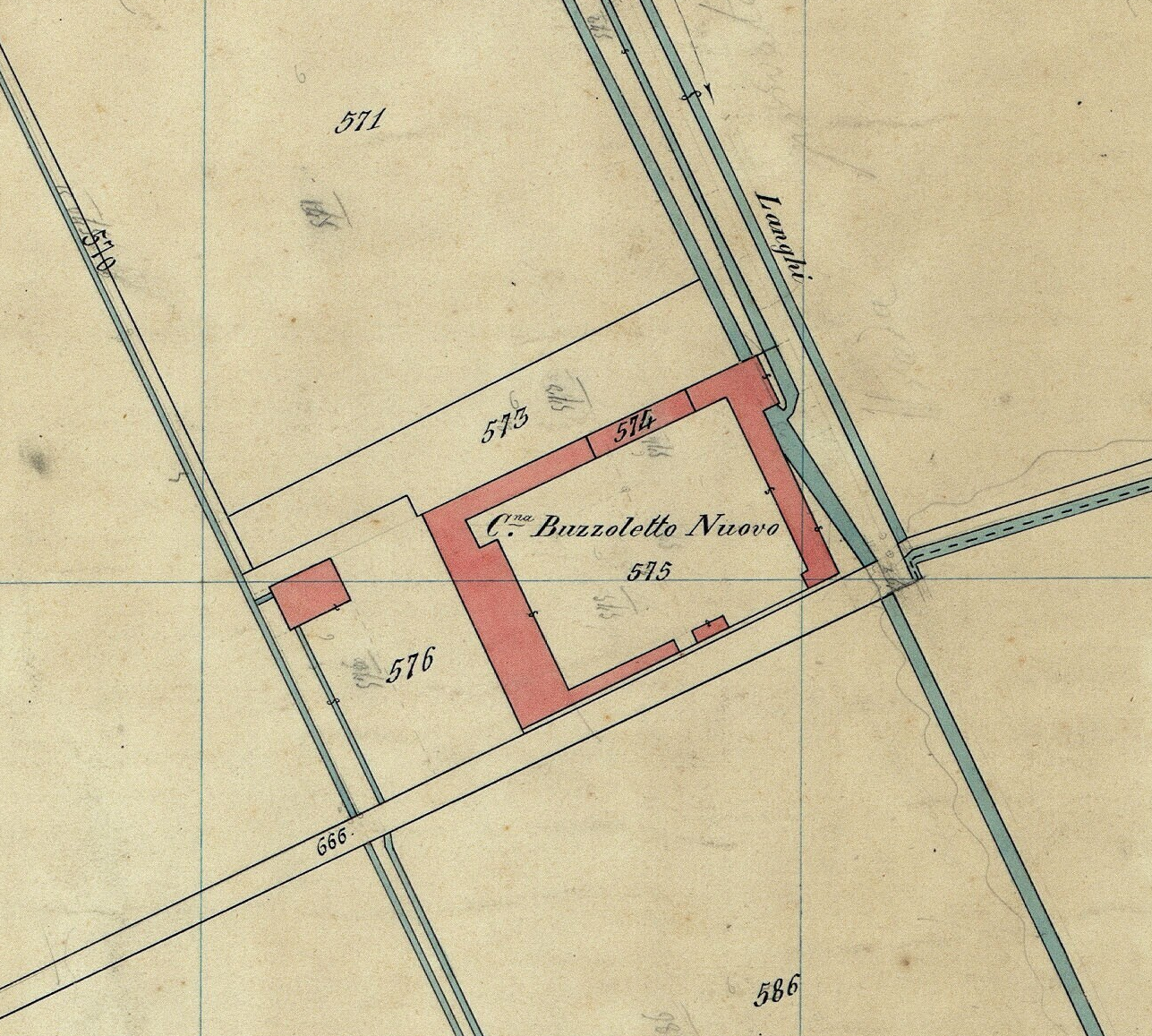
Plan of Rabbini Cadastre (1867)

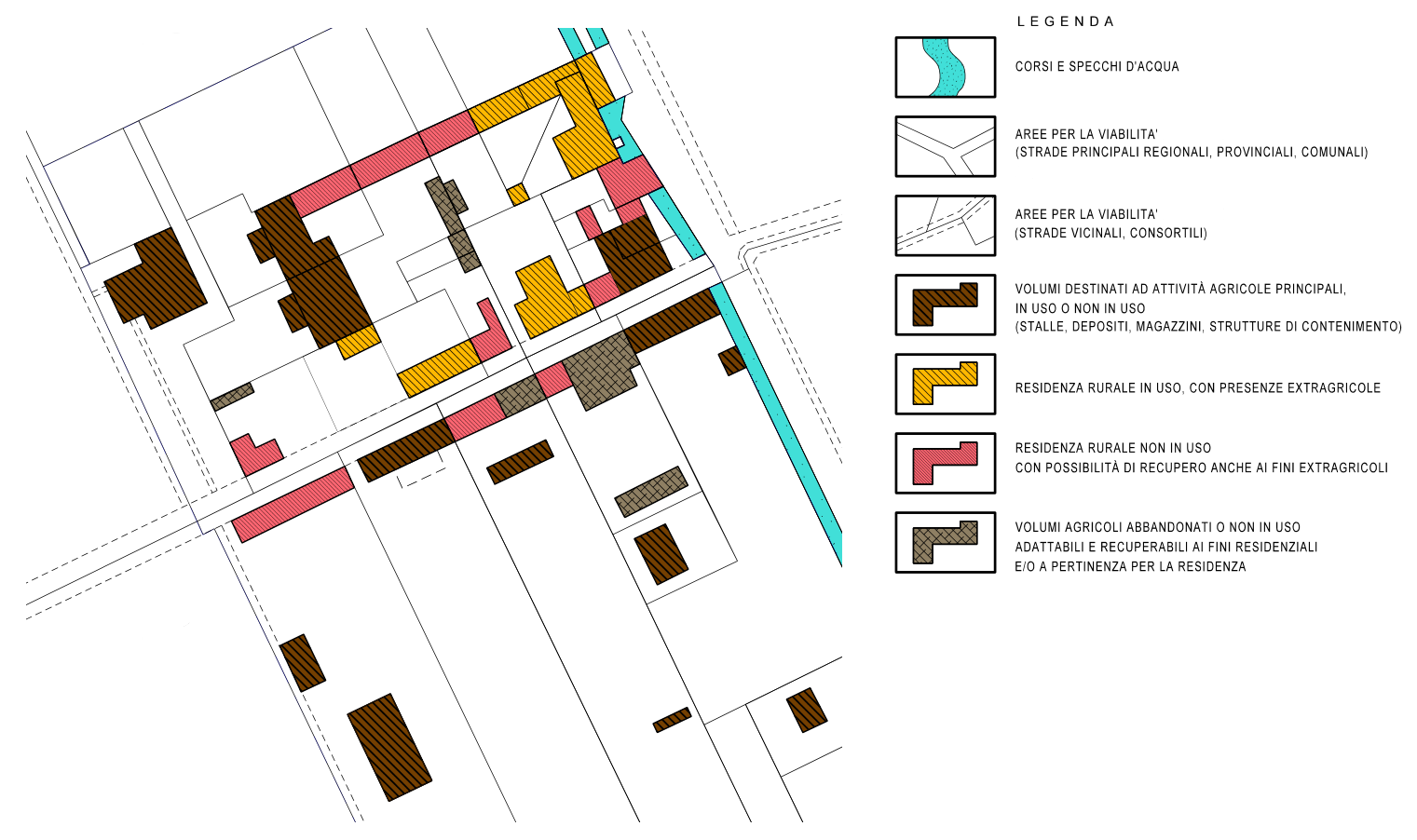
Plan of P.R.G.C. (2003)

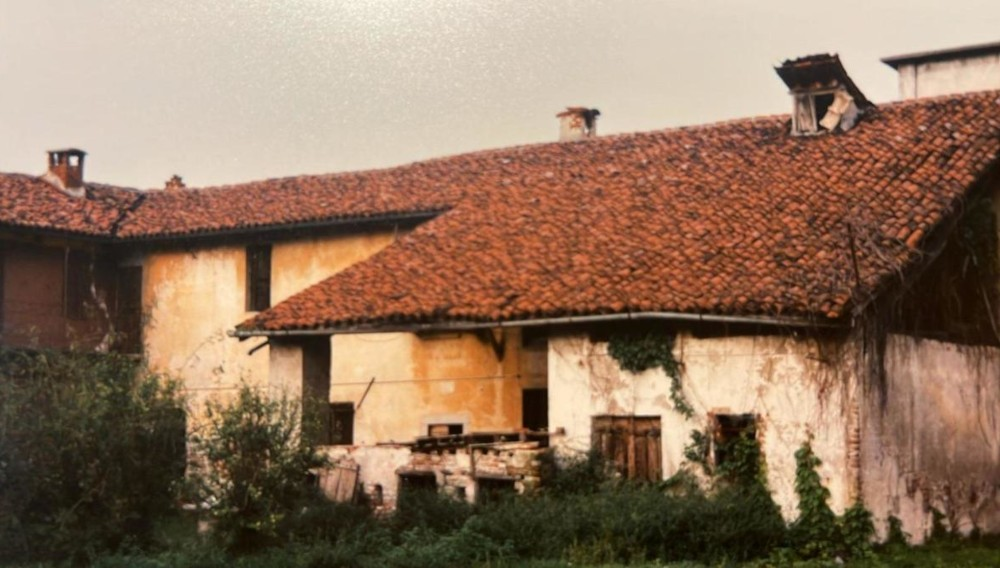
View of the farmyard (1994)

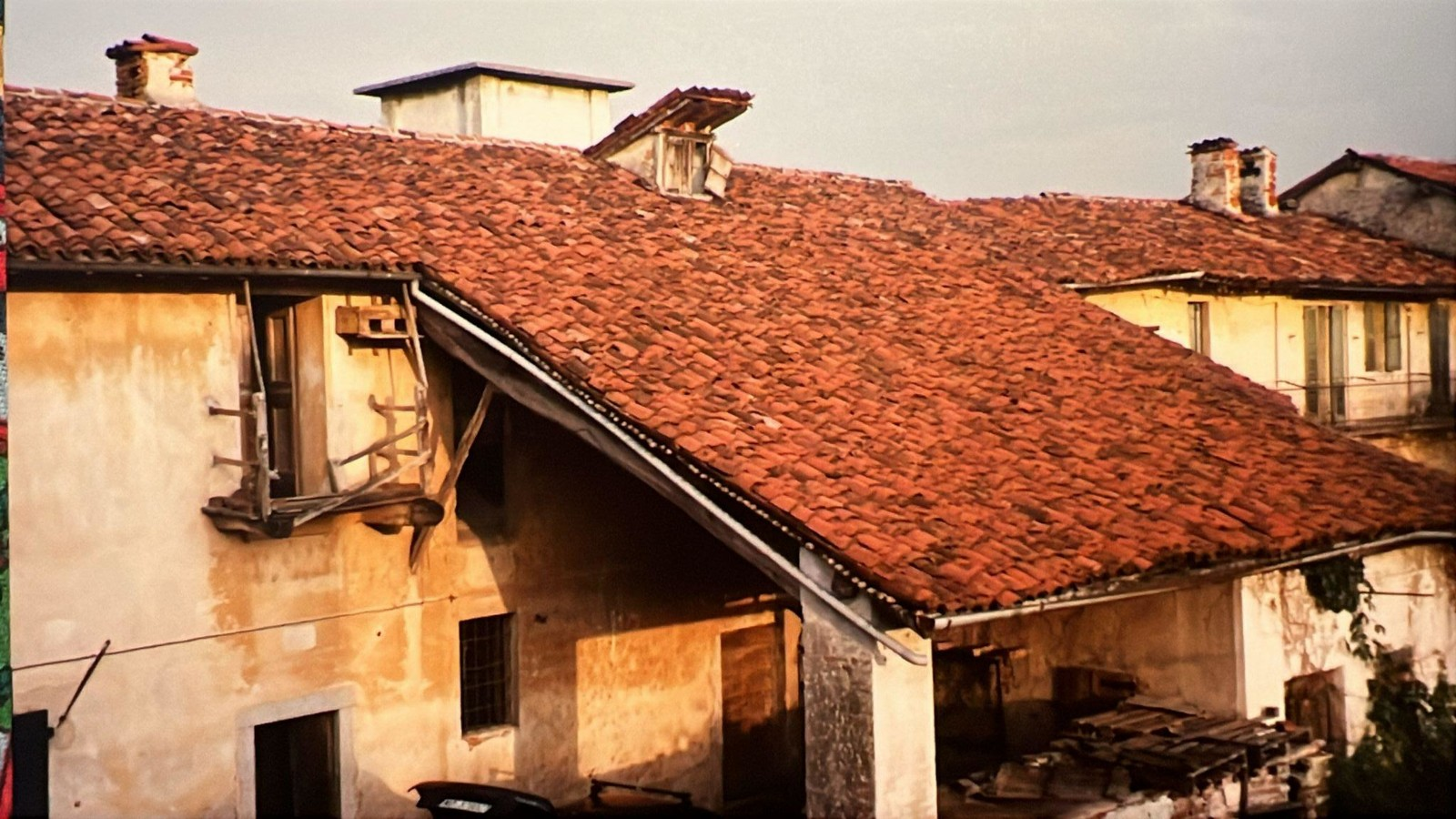
View of the farmyard (1994)

== See also ==
- History of Garbagna Novarese
- Oratorio di Santa Maria, location of two frescoes commissioned by people living in Buzzoletto Vecchio and Moncucco in late 15th century

== Bibliography ==
- Cassani, Lino; Mellerio, Gottardo; Tosi, Mario, eds. (1937). Consignationes beneficiorum dioecesis Novariensis factae anno 1347 tempore Reverendissimi Domini Guglielmi Episcopi [Consignments of the benefices of the diocese of Novara made in the year 1347 at the time of the Most Reverend Bishop William] (in Latin). Vol. 1. Novara: E. Cattaneo.
- Cassani, Lino; Colli, Ernesto (1948). Memorie storiche di Garbagna Novarese [Historical memories of Garbagna Novarese] (in Italian). Novara: Tip. Pietro Riva & C – via Foto Emilio Alzati.
- Cognasso, Francesco (1952). Novara e il suo territorio [Novara and its territory] (in Italian). Novara: Banca Popolare di Novara – via Byterfly.
- Colli, Ernesto (1978). Garbagna, Nibbiola, Vespolate, Borgolavezzaro - Le mie memorie [Garbagna, Nibbiola, Vespolate, Borgolavezzaro - My memories] (in Italian). Novara: Tip. San Gaudenzio – via Foto Emilio Alzati.
- AA. VV. (1981). La bassa novarese [The Lower Novarese] (in Italian). Novara: Camera di Commercio Industria Artigianato Agricoltura.
- Arrigoni, Enrico; Mambrini, Gabrio; Ramati, Silvano (1989). Oltre mezzo secolo di sport e di passione calcistica a Garbagna [Over half a century of sport and football passion in Garbagna] (in Italian). Illustrated by Rosella Marchetti, patronage by municipality of Garbagna Novarese. Novara: Istituto Geografico De Agostini.
- Mongiat, Emiliana; Porzio, Maria Grazia; Tuniz, Dorino, eds. (2003). Le cascine: un patrimonio da recuperare [The farmsteads: a heritage to be recovered] (in Italian). Vol. 1: Indagine sulle strutture agricole di Novara e dell'ovest Ticino. Provincia di Novara.
- Bisogni, Fabio; Calciolari, Chiara, eds. (2006). Affreschi novaresi del Trecento e del Quattrocento: arte, devozione e società [Novara frescoes from the 14th and 15th centuries: art, devotion, and society] (in Italian). Cinisello Balsamo: Silvana. ISBN 978-8-83-660651-1.
