= Highland Potato Famine =

Major agrarian crisis in the Scottish Highlands from 1846 to 1857

Highland Potato Famine Gaiseadh a' bhuntàta
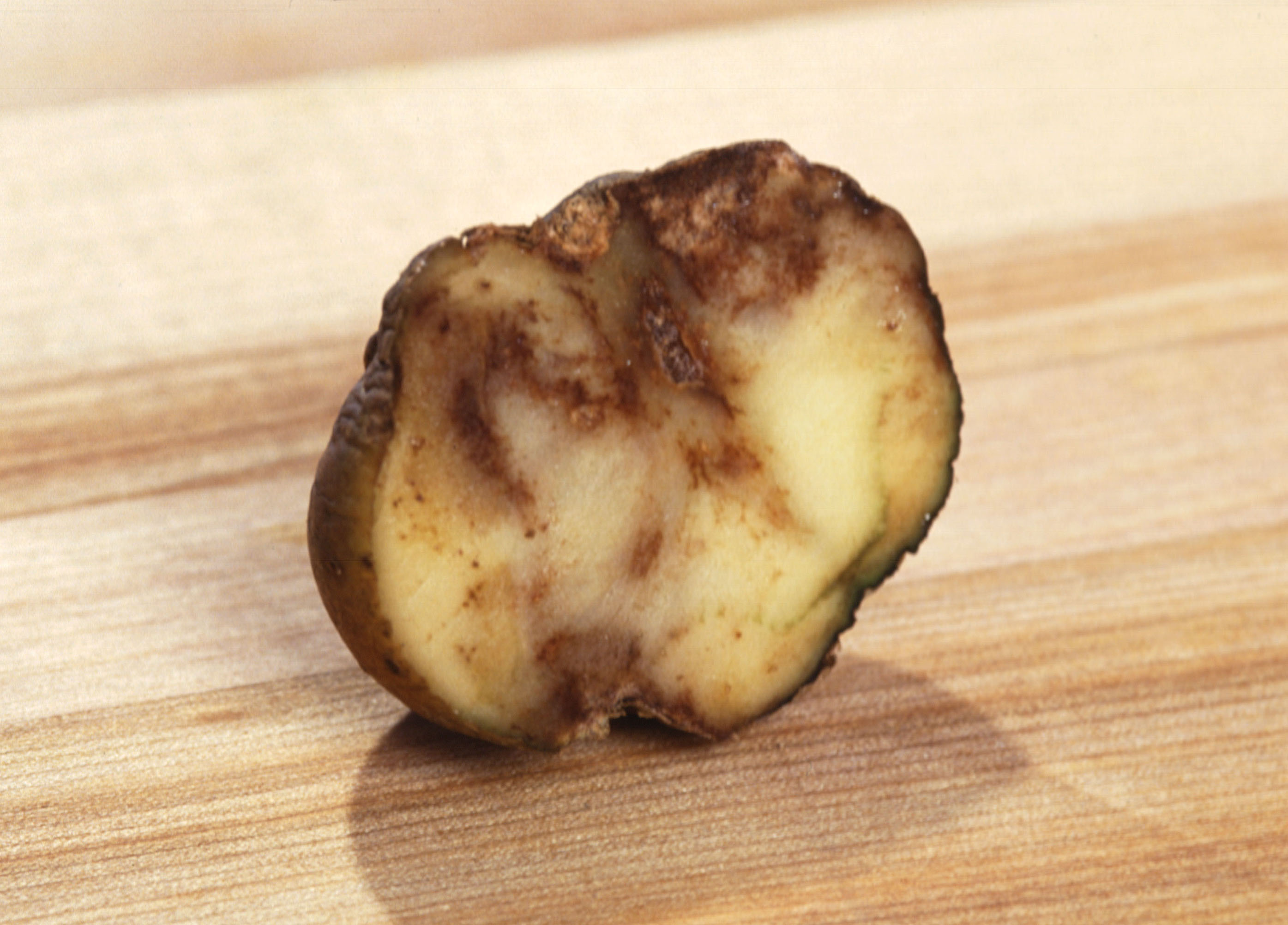
- Cross-section of a blighted potato tuber
- Country: United Kingdom
- Location: Scotland
- Period: 1846–1856
- Causes: Policy failure, potato blight

The Highland Potato Famine (Scottish Gaelic: Gaiseadh a' bhuntàta) was a period of 19th-century Scottish Highland history (1846 to roughly 1856) over which the agricultural communities of the Hebrides and the western Scottish Highlands (Gàidhealtachd) saw their potato crop (upon which they had become over-reliant) repeatedly devastated by potato blight. It was part of the wider food crisis facing Northern Europe caused by potato blight during the mid-1840s, whose most famous manifestation is the Great Irish Famine, but compared with its Irish counterpart, it was much less extensive (the population seriously at risk was never more than 200,000 – and often much less) and took many fewer lives as prompt and major charitable efforts by the rest of the United Kingdom ensured relatively little starvation.

The terms on which charitable relief was given, however, led to destitution and malnutrition amongst its recipients. A government enquiry could suggest no short-term solution other than reduction of the population of the area at risk by emigration to Canada or Australia. Highland landlords organised and paid for the emigration of more than 16,000 of their tenants and a significant but unknown number paid for their own passage. Evidence suggests that the majority of Highlanders who permanently left the famine-struck regions emigrated, rather than moving to other parts of Scotland. It is estimated that about a third of the population of the western Scottish Highlands emigrated between 1841 and 1861.

== Vulnerability of crofting areas ==
Over the late 18th and early 19th century, Highland society had changed greatly. On the eastern fringes of the Highlands, most arable land was divided into family farms with 20 to 50 acres (8.1 to 20.2 hectares) (Note: of arable land, with normally an additional acreage of grazing: a typical mid-19th-century census entry for the tenant of one of these farms would be "Farmer of 500 acres of which 50 arable") employing crofters (with some land held in their own right, insufficient on its own to give them an adequate living) and cottars (farm workers with no land of their own, sometimes sub-let a small patch of land by their employer or a crofter). The economy had become assimilated to that of the Lowlands, whose proximity allowed and encouraged a diverse agriculture. Proximity to the Lowlands had also led to a steady drain of population from these areas. In the Western Isles and the adjacent mainland developments had been very different. Chieftains who had become improving landlords had found livestock-grazing (generally sheep, sometimes cattle) the most remunerative form of agriculture; to accommodate this they had moved their tenants to coastal townships where they hoped valuable industries could be developed and established an extensive crofting system (see Highland Clearances). Croft sizes were set low to encourage the tenantry to participate in the industry (e.g. fishing, kelp (Note: Various seaweeds, including true kelp, gathered and burned to yield soda ash. The industry was only able to compete with imported barilla in the early 19th century because of the Napoleonic Wars and a high import duty on barilla: from 1822 onwards the duty on barilla was progressively reduced and 1845 abolished; by then neither natural source could compete on price with the Leblanc process. "Kelp was formerly a valuable resource of the highland and Irish peasantry on the coast, but it ceased to be remunerative as Barilla became cheaper, and the manufacture of soda by chemical means has reduced the price still more and utterly destroyed the trade")) the landlord wished to develop.

A contemporary writer thought that a crofter would have to do work away from his holding for 200 days a year if his family were to avoid destitution. The various industries the crofting townships were supposed to support mostly prospered in the first quarter of the 19th century (drawing workers over and above the originally intended population of townships) but declined or collapsed over its second quarter. The crofting areas were correspondingly impoverished, but able to sustain themselves by a much greater reliance on potatoes (it was reckoned that one acre growing potatoes could support as many people as four acres growing oats). Between 1801 and 1841 the population in the crofting area increased by over half, whereas in the eastern and southern Highlands the increase in the same period was under 10 percent. Consequently, immediately pre-blight, whilst mainland Argyll had over 2 acres (0.8 hectares) of arable land per inhabitant, there was only 1/2 acre (0.2 hectares) of arable land per head in Skye and Wester Ross: in the crofting area, as in Ireland, the population had grown to levels which only a successful potato harvest could support.

== Famine and destitution ==
=== Famine (1846–1847) ===
In the Scottish Highlands, in 1846, there was widespread failure of potato crops as a result of potato blight. Crops failed in about three-quarters of the crofting region, putting a population of about 200,000 at risk; the following winter was especially cold and snowy and the death rate rose significantly. The Free Church of Scotland, strong in the affected areas, was prompt in raising the alarm and in organising relief, being the only body actively doing so in late 1846 and early 1847; relief was given regardless of denomination. Additionally, the Free Church organised transport for over 3,000 men from the famine-struck regions to work on the Lowland railways. This both removed people who needed to be fed from the area and provided money for their families to buy food.

The British government took early notice of the crop failure. They were approached for assistance by landowners at the end of the summer of 1846, but any direct subsidies to the landlords were ruled out, as this would have relieved them of their responsibilities to their tenants. Sir Charles Trevelyan, the Assistant Secretary to the Treasury (effectively the senior civil servant at this department) provided the lead. The government was restricted by the common attitudes of the middle of the 19th century: minimal intervention, and there was deep concern to avoid upsetting the free play of normal market forces. Despite the constraints of these ruling economic theories, Trevelyan made completely clear that "the people cannot, under any circumstances, be allowed to starve" in a letter of September 1846.

The government's first action was to ensure that Highland landlord met their responsibilities to provide famine relief to their tenants. Landlord response varied. Some had both the resources and the willingness to do this. (Note: For example, the 2nd Duke of Sutherland, a hereditary landowner, and James Matheson, who had recently bought the Isle of Lewis, both of whom were very wealthy and felt it a matter of pride to look after their tenants.) Others, typically among the remaining hereditary landowners, were in perilous financial conditions and struggled to meet expectations, some of them being in denial about their lack of ability to do so. (Note: A well-known example was Norman MacLeod of MacLeod, owner of one of the 2 major estates on Skye, who did not hesitate to buy food for his destitute tenants, but was obliged to sell all the properties he could by the spring of 1847 and find employment in London, in his words "a ruined man".) The last class, those who had the means to fund relief for their tenants, but chose not to, (Note: For example, the obstinacy of Colonel John Gordon of Cluny meant that the government had to send grain to Barra, South Uist and Benbecula over the winter of 1846.) were put under substantial pressure by the government. Senior relief officers made personal inspections of their properties (the Royal Navy had a steamer to provide transport for this). Formal exhortations were made over the winter of 1846 to those who still did not comply. Threats were added that the government would recover the costs of relief they had provided, even by selling part of the problem estates. By mid-1847, even the notorious Colonel John Gordon of Cluny was acknowledged by the senior relief officer, Sir Edward Pine Coffin, as having improved beyond the worst class of landlord.

The government stationed two meal depots at Portree and Tobermory, Mull in the winter of 1846-7 and based a team of relief officers in the affected areas. The depots sold meal only at market prices - any hint of a subsidy went against free market principles. However, the purpose in establishing the depots was to prevent spiralling prices due to local shortages - thereby demonstrating the dilemma in choosing practical, necessary measures that fitted with the contemporary views on political economy. Existing legislation was examined for ways of providing help. Innovative measures were shunned for fear of expanding the role of government. Discretion was allowed to Inspectors of the Poor in providing meal to recipients of casual relief for destitute families. A much larger use of current law was the active encouragement of landowners to apply for loans under the Drainage and Public Works Act. After streamlining of the cumbersome application process, this channelled money to landlords that allowed them to employ their tenantry to improve the land that they rented.

Following on from the Free Church's voluntary efforts, relief committees were set up in Edinburgh in December 1846 and Glasgow in January 1847. By February 1847, the Free Church and the Edinburgh and Glasgow groups combined to form the Central Board of Management for Highland Relief. By the end of 1847 the Relief Committees had raised about £210,000 (roughly equivalent in purchasing power to £17m in 2018) to support relief work. Other groups to organise relief work included the British Relief Association; its efforts were coordinated by Lord Kinnaird and the Earl of Dalhousie. News of the famine led the Scottish diaspora, including Scottish-Americans, to organise relief efforts.

The prompt response of the Lowlands (and the much smaller size of the problem) meant that famine relief programmes were better organised and more effective in Scotland than in Ireland. As in Ireland, the export of foodstuffs from Scotland was not prohibited, and in Inverness, Wick, Cromarty, and Invergordon, troops were used to quell protests about the export of grain or potatoes from local harbours.

=== Destitution relief (1847–1850) ===
In 1847 the crop failure was less extensive, and death rates had returned to normal; thereafter the government left famine relief to the Central Board. Crop failures continued, but at a reduced level, and the charitable relief programme only ceased upon the near-exhaustion of its funds. One modern historian summarises its evolution: "... gradually it took on the worst features of mid-Victorian philanthropy. At once autocratic and bureaucratic, the Board became a gradgrind employer, paying rock bottom wages in kind for hard labour on public works... ". Relief was not available to those with any disposable capital (which was interpreted to include livestock). The daily ration (of oatmeal or Indian meal) was initially set by the Central Board at 24 ounces (680 g) per man, 12 oz (340 g) per woman and 8 oz (230 g) per child. (Note: "Corn flour, whole-grain, yellow" contains 361 kcal/100g and hence an ounce of maize flour contains just over 100 kcal) Recipients were expected to work for their rations, leading to the building of "destitution roads" and other public works of little (if any) real value. This requirement was not rigorously enforced at first, but potato crops failed to recover to pre-blight levels, and the Central Board became concerned that long-term recipients of the rations would become "pauperised". (Note: Reconciled to long-term welfare dependency, rather than simply poor. It was inherent in the thinking of the age that the recipients of relief should be reduced to poverty and generally live in such a state that no self-respecting man would claim relief unless he had no option.)

Eleemosynary aid… would be a curse instead of a benefit; and hence it was absolutely necessary to teach the people of the Highlands that they must depend on their resources for the future. To accomplish this object it would be requisite to instruct them in croft husbandry, in developing the treasures of the deep, and in prosecuting the manufacture of kelp.

To encourage them to stand on their own feet, the ration was reduced (e.g. to 16 ounces (450 g) per man), and it would only be given to those doing a full eight-hour day's work. This "destitution test", harsh in itself, implemented by Victorian bureaucracy, and policed by officials used to enforcing naval discipline, engendered considerable hostility.

=== End of charitable relief (1850) ===
By 1850, the relief funds were almost exhausted and, with potato blight persisting, there was a growing sense (even within the relief committees) that long-term solutions were needed; the provision of short-term aid had delayed these being adopted. The Destitution Relief Boards announced that their operations would cease at the end of September 1850. In doing so, they expressed two concerns: if the potato crop failed again things would be as bad as in 1846; on the other hand, if the 1850 crop was largely unaffected, the Highlanders would not learn the lesson that the blight should teach them and revert to their old ways, and four years' effort to diversify their sources of food and of income would have gone to waste.

There were again considerable failures of the potato crop in 1850, and the question then naturally arose as to how the distressed population were to be supported. The Scottish Poor Laws, unlike those in England, allowed relief to be given from the parish poor rates only to the sick and infirm and explicitly forbade any relief being given to the able-bodied poor unable to find work locally. As early as 1848 Sir Charles Trevelyan had advocated that the Scottish Poor Law be amended to allow the able-bodied poor to claim relief; critics countered that the scale of destitution was such that it was clearly unrealistic to expect a large number of unemployed in a distressed parish to be supported solely by rates levied on that parish.

In response to inquiries from county officials, the government indicated that it did not intend to make additional funds available now that the charitable relief effort had ended, neither to provide relief in situ nor to assist emigration from distressed areas. It suggested that a Poor Law clause giving the Poor Law authorities discretion to grant relief to those temporarily unable to work might (somewhat contrary to its wording) be used to provide relief to the able-bodied poor willing but unable to find work. It set up an enquiry under Sir John McNeill, the chairman of the Board of Supervision (of Scottish Poor Law Boards), to investigate the situation and recommend remedies.

=== Sir John McNeill's report (1851–1852) ===
Having carried out his enquiry from February to April 1851, Sir John made his report in July 1851. He ascribed the current difficulties to the sub-division of crofts (or, amounting to the same thing, more than one family being supported by a single croft) in times of prosperity, and to the insularity of the Highlanders. When the kelp industry had collapsed they surely would have sought work elsewhere had they not been separated by habits and language from the majority of the population and regarded the rest of the kingdom as a foreign country. Such emigration as had taken place had been of the prosperous; in replacing them the landlords had discovered tacksmen operating large grazings to be willing to pay higher rents and more reliable in paying them. That discovery had led them to move crofters to more marginal areas to create more grazings.

There had been no known deaths by starvation (Note: On the basis of enquiry to the parochial Poor Law Boards, who of course were expected to prevent such deaths. In 1851 Scotland had neither civil registration of deaths (which would require a cause of death to be identified) nor coroner's inquests) since the cessation of Relief Board operations (to put those in proportion, he noted that total expenditure by the Relief Board on Skye in 1850 was less than half the value of taxed whisky sales on Skye in 1850, gratuitously going on to note that the latter was more than double the value of sales in 1846) and the predicted humanitarian crisis had not materialised. On Skye, where the parochial boards had been giving discretionary relief to the able-bodied in response to the end of Relief Board Operations even before government guidance:

the working classes, disabused of the notion that the eleemosynary aid they had been receiving for some years would be permanent, and thrown upon the local resources and their own exertions, have hitherto surmounted the danger, with an amount of relief absolutely trifling. No doubt, suffering must have been endured, the pressure upon all classes must have been severe: but to the latest date to which intelligence has been received, there is no sufficient reason to believe that one life has yet been lost in consequence of the cessation of eleemosynary relief

Consequently, he concluded that the programme of extensive relief to the able-bodied poor, although well-intentioned, had ultimately been deleterious. He made no recommendation for changes to the Scottish Poor Law to give the able-bodied poor a right to claim parish relief, but recommended all parochial boards to give discretionary relief.

Various schemes of improvement had been attempted locally to relieve destitution and had been urged upon him as deserving wider adoption. However, the areas less badly affected by destitution were not those where these schemes had been attempted, but rather those where communications with the rest of the country were relatively good, where there was greater acceptance of seasonal migration in search of work, or where there were significant other sources of income. There was widespread agreement, therefore, that in the short term, prompt and widespread emigration was necessary to the well-being of the population and to their extrication from their current difficulties. Parliament should therefore authorise loans to assist immigration as they had formerly loans to assist improvements in the distressed areas.

With the population reduced, the area could be made more resilient against future crises by giving crofters greater security of tenure (so giving them some incentive for agricultural improvement), by instruction in agriculture and the management of stock, and by better education. "Increased and improved means of education would tend to enlighten the people and to fit them for seeking their livelihood in distant places, as well as tend to break the bonds that now confine them to their native localities", but education should not simply be in the "three Rs"; it should also seek to excite a desire for knowledge in which respect education in the Highlands was currently deficient.

This led to the creation by January 1852 of the Highland and Island Emigration Society by Trevelyan and McNeill .

=== Blight dies away ===
Blight returned year after year, but never to the same extent as in 1846. As late as 1854, the complete loss of the potato crop was being reported for local blackspots such as the Hebridean communities of Barra and Harris (where the blight was said to be more prevalent than in 1846). In subsequent years blight was usually reported in various localities, but it was always only partial and never as bad as first feared: "There is some clamour about the potato blight but ... the fear is greater than the hurt." On Lewis, Sir James Matheson had spent £33,000 in three years to support his tenants; in six of the next thirty years he had to provide similar help, but on a much smaller scale and with a greater likelihood of being repaid:

Year	1855	1862	1863	1864	1869	1877
Value of meal and seed advanced	£806	£150	£740	£278	£1886	£353

== Consequent depopulation ==
Most landlords worked to lessen the effects of the famine on their crofting tenants: forgoing rent, donating to the relief committees, running their own parallel relief operations, funding the introduction of new crops and industries or reviving old ones. However, as it became apparent that crofting at current population levels had long-term problems, they feared that the government would impose some system of permanent relief charged against their estates (either directly or through Poor Law reform). They instead sought to solve or remove the problems by inducing their poorer tenants to migrate to the Lowlands, or emigrate overseas.

There was theoretical support on the problem of excess population from the work of Malthus, and this certainly had an influence on the management of the Duke of Sutherland's estate. His factor in the Scourie district (Evander McIver) worked both to persuade the landlord to subsidise emigration and to encourage the tenantry to accept the assistance offered. Whilst the second Duke of Sutherland effectively forbade eviction to achieve this, the influence of favourable reports from previous emigrants, coupled with the level of destitution in the community acted as a stimulus for people to leave. Extreme poverty acted as a barrier to emigration – emphasising the importance of financial assistance from the landlord.

The crofting areas lost about a third of their population between the early 1840s and the late 1850s; losses were higher in the Hebrides and remoter areas of the mainland such as Ardnamurchan, with over 40% of inhabitants being evicted by 1856. Some landlords contributed towards "assisted" emigration (under which over 16,000 crofters were shipped overseas to Canada and Australia), others encouraged their tenants to move by taking a harder line on rent arrears, turf-cutting rights, and other practices on which tenants had traditionally been allowed some leeway. But – since crofters had no security of tenure – landlords could simply evict their superfluous tenants. Pine Coffin became alarmed by the extent of evictions in 1848-9, warning of "the unsettling of the very foundations of the social system".

On Lewis, the large-scale "voluntary" emigration to Canada from the Matheson estates was encouraged by both the carrot (promises of good treatment of volunteers) and the stick (reminders to tenants of their rent arrears and the possibility of their eviction). A witness of it said in the 1880s: "Some people say it was voluntary. But there was a great deal of forcing and these people were sent very much against their will. That is very well known and people present know that perfectly well. Of course, they were not taken in hand by the police and all that, but they were in arrears and had to go, and remonstrated against going."

=== Barra – "The most destitute" emigrants "I ever saw" ===
Barra was a particularly hard case and in due course a cause celebre; it had been prosperous, but the hereditary McNeill proprietor had set up a kelp works which had drawn in outsiders; the works had proved uneconomic and to meet its losses, the crofters' rents had been raised to unsustainable levels. The kelp works were abandoned, but the high rents retained. "The poverty of the people is beyond description" wrote their parish priest in 1830. Despite the high rents, McNeill went bankrupt and his trustees in bankruptcy seized and sold most of the islanders' livestock (their main source of income) to pay rent arrears. Barra itself ended up in the hands of John Gordon of Cluny, "the richest commoner in Scotland" (he died worth £2m in 1858). Colonel Gordon (he was a colonel in the Aberdeenshire Militia) was notoriously parsimonious in his personal habits, but he authorised his factor to reduce rents to realistic levels and attempted various schemes (most notably a deep-water fishery) to improve the lot of the islanders (and his income from the island). These schemes met with little cooperation (and in some cases active opposition) from the islanders, and came to nothing: by 1850 Gordon had owned Barra for ten years, and seen no return for his money. Consequently, the islanders were still both poor and heavily dependent on potatoes. Furthermore, their landlord had no sentimental ties to them or the island, and held that the islanders were largely the authors of their own misfortune: if they had supported his improvements they would not find themselves dependent on the benevolence of others.

Potato blight destroyed any possibility of Barra being self-sufficient. In November 1850, it was reported of that year's cereal crop that "it might give about 453 bolls of meal, or what would be adequate to the support of the population for about two months; whilst even then there were families who did not possess so many pecks of meal as there were persons in them." (Note: The boll was originally a measure of volume for dry goods, but at the time of the Highland Potato Famine had become defined by weight. Its definition varied depending on the item being measured, but a boll of oatmeal was 140 pounds (10 stone) or 63.5 kg. A peck is more variably defined, but can be taken, in context, to mean a quarter of a firlot, which in turn is a quarter of a boll. So one peck is 8.75 pounds or 4 kg.) Consequently, the islanders became dependent on the benevolence of others to an extraordinary extent: in 1850, 1,965 of a population of 2,300 received relief. Gordon attempted to consolidate small crofts into larger holdings better able to support their tenants (his version) or to reduce the number of destitute islanders he would have to support (the view taken by his critics). Some Barra islanders appeared, penniless, ragged, and unable to speak English, on the streets of Glasgow just before Christmas 1850 . The tale told on their behalf was that they were only a small part of 132 families evicted from their holdings in May 1850; they squatted on waste land only to be evicted when relief operations ceased in September 1850. They excited public sympathy and Gordon became the target of criticism in Scottish newspapers for having them removed first from their homes and secondly from the island of their birth; the criticism intensified when he indicated he had no intention of assisting them. (Note: His refusal (although legal) went against a widely held maxim of the age that "property has its responsibilities, as well as its rights".) Gordon denied that he had had anybody evicted "at this inclement time of year" and denied all knowledge of why they had left Barra; he would welcome further enquiry, as it would show the truth of the matter. He replied to criticism by letting it be known that, prior to the evictions, he had cooperated with the Relief Committee, given them £1000, and spent nearly £2300 in relieving distress in the island; he declared himself willing to lay out more money if anyone could show him where it might effect lasting good.

The Barra islanders who reached Glasgow do not appear to have given interviews to journalists (and were subsequently claimed by the Barra Parochial Board to have left Barra in July and to be known bad characters). A subsequent party arrived at Inverness and talked to a Gaelic-speaking journalist, giving an account which was markedly different but not significantly more favourable to Gordon. The Inverness party said they had been moved from their crofts two to three years ago: "Ejectments were made illegally. No summonses of removal were served, nor any steps taken before the judge ordinary, or any other. The bare authority of Colonel Gordon, in a letter to the ground-officer, was that on which their houses were pulled about their ears, to make way for the large farmers to whom their crofts were let". They had been moved to infertile land; their crops were small or blighted, and they had been living on relief. When the Destitution Board had ceased operation, Gordon had taken over relief, but with inferior and unpalatable meal. They had not been evicted from the island; indeed Gordon's factor had refused them any assistance to leave the island – not even any meal for the journey. They were, however, convinced that Gordon was deliberately trying to "disgust them into" leaving. (In contrast to the treatment they had had from Gordon and his agents, they had reached Inverness through multiple kindnesses: An Irish merchant on Barra had given them provisions; the captain of a Board of Northern Lights lighthouse tender had kindly taken them to Tobermory; the townsfolk of Tobermory had fed them, lodged them, and given them money to pay their fare to Oban; the captain of the Tobermory–Oban packet had refused payment; the people of Oban "had outdone those of Tobermory in generosity"; and so on.)

In 1851, the Parochial Board of Barra reported that over half the population wished to emigrate if only they had the means. In May, they told the Board of Supervision that they did not have the funds to continue relief to the able-bodied poor – the Board wrote back to say it was their responsibility to do so. Gordon chartered ships and offered free passage to Quebec to his tenants in Barra and South Uist (and to those recently evicted). About 1,700 people availed themselves of the offer, but on arrival at Quebec some members of the last shipload signed a statement that they had been induced to emigrate by promises by their landlord (free onward passage to Upper Canada, guaranteed work, the possibility of free land grants) which they now found were illusory. They said twenty of those on the ship had wanted to change their mind about emigrating, but had been dragooned onto the ship by Gordon's factor and a police constable. (Note: the emigration from Barra is sometimes described as forced or forcible and this is supported by oral tradition on Barra, but this seems to be the full extent of the coercion as far as contemporary newspapers were concerned – despite the highly critical view they took of Gordon no claims were recorded that emigrants had never wanted to emigrate but been forced to.) The emigrants arrived on board half-starving (Note: They were noted to have been living on seaweed and shellfish, "the meal supplied by the Destitution Committee being inadequate to support them". (At this stage the meal was not supplied by the Destitution Committee but was the much inferior "Colonel Gordon's pound of salt water-saturated Indian meal" (16 oz of maize is about 1,600–1,700 kcal and inadequate for 8 hours' manual labour): the seaweed was "'slocken' (a kind of dulse)". (For shore dwellers, shellfish and seaweed are sensible sources for the protein and vitamins inherently lacking in a cereal (or potato) diet and are not intrinsically "famine foods")) and half-naked (some children were naked: "Many children of nine and ten years old had not a rag to cover them. Mrs Crisp the wife of the master of ... [the ship] ... was employed the whole of the voyage converting empty bread-bags, old canvases and blankets into coverings for them"). They arrived in Quebec unable to support themselves and without any means of paying for passage to Upper Canada (where they might be able to find work); the Canadian authorities had to lay out £670 to get them there. Because they had not sailed until August, they arrived too late to be properly settled before the onset of a Canadian winter, for which they remained unprepared. The vice-president of a Scottish benevolent society in Hamilton, Upper Canada, wrote: "the emigrants from Barra and South Uist, amounting to between two and three thousand were the most destitute I ever saw coming to this country. They were actually in a state of nudity on their arrival here and were utterly helpless".

The lot of the emigrants from Gordon of Cluny's estates was woeful, and drew a letter of complaint from the Canadian authorities to Gordon's factor but both that letter and contemporary newspaper reports made a comparison with the better treatment of emigrants from other Highland estates by their former landlords. "The Lewis men were provided ... not only with clothing for the voyage, and a free passage to Quebec, but with a week's rations after arrival ... and a free passage to their ultimate destination". Emigrants from the Duke of Sutherland's estates arrived well-clad and fed, and with money to buy and stock farms; where their own savings were inadequate, the Duke had gifted them money.

== Aftermath ==
McNeill's report did not endorse the argument of papers such as the Scotsman that the destitution was due to the inherent laziness of the Gael (which contrasted unfavourably with the estimable traits of the 'Teutonic' Lowland Scots who read the Scotsman), but his comments on the cultural barriers which had hindered timely migration from the congested areas mirrored and reinforced a prevalent assumption that Gaelic culture and language was an unnecessary brake on progress and the long-term happiness and prosperity of the Gaelic-speaking areas could best be secured by making them English-speaking. Two decades after the famine the Edinburgh Courant noted emigration from Hebridean islands, which was the best cure for their ills, was accelerated by education: "It is startling enough to be asked to establish and maintain a school system for the purpose of depopulating a district, but we have little doubt this would be the first effect and the best success of the thorough education of the Hebrides". Consequently, on the other hand "There is still a prejudice among some of the old people against any but Gaelic education, because they see that it gives their children wings with which they can fly away from the family nest".

In the immediate aftermath of the famine government resisted arguments that it should subsidise a railway to Oban in order to reduce the isolation of the Hebrides. Only in 1880 did the Caledonian Railway eventually reach Oban after taking over the Callander and Oban Railway. In 1867 the inhabitants of Stornoway got their mail via a twice-weekly steamer from Greenock. Consequently, it took 74 to 132 hours for letters to reach Stornoway from Edinburgh or London, and any reply had to wait half a week for the next steamer. Complaints that Stornoway was worse served than some other islands were denied by their inhabitants; letters posted in London took as long to reach Barra as they would to reach Bombay. Services to Skye and Lewis improved when the Dingwall and Skye Railway reached Stromeferry in 1870 and began steamer services from a pier there. More generally, better steamships and more frequent services eventually allowed better communication, and the recovery of fishing and cattle-rearing and the greater ease of temporary migration for seasonal work eventually allowed the crofting economy to move from self-sufficiency to one in which enough cash was generated to allow the purchase of imported grain.

In the 1880s, the technical issue of how to avoid future famines or seasons of destitution in the Highlands became submerged in the political question of how to address the grievances of crofters and cottars (agricultural labourers without land). Landlords had taken to heart McNeill's comments on the need to prevent uncontrolled population growth in crofting areas by preventing sub-division or multiple occupancy of crofts; they had taken much less notice of his view that crofters should be granted secure leases. Consequently, there was growing resentment amongst the crofting communities. In 1882 there were failures of both the potato and cereal harvests in the Hebrides (because of blight and wind damage, respectively); this led to widespread destitution in 1883.

There was also unrest among the crofters and formation of a Highland Land League which took its inspiration from the Irish Land League. The Gladstone Government set up the Napier Commission (a "Royal Commission of Inquiry into the Condition of Crofters and Cottars in the Highlands and Islands" under Lord Napier ) to identify remedies. Napier's report in 1884 recommended security of tenure for crofters paying rents of over £6 a year (of whom there were few) and voluntary emigration for the rest of the population. Napier's recommendations were at odds with the measures adopted in Ireland to resolve the Irish 'land question' and the subsequent Crofters' Holdings (Scotland) Act, 1886 was more influenced by the Irish precedents than by the Napier Commission report. In the General Election of 1885, 5 Highland seats had elected 'Independent Liberal' MPs endorsed by the Highland Land League ("the Crofters' Party") and thereafter political considerations heavily influenced the Liberal approach to the problems of the crofting region.

== See also ==
- Agriculture in Scotland
- Great Famine (Ireland)
- European Potato Famine
