= Rod (unit) =

Unit of length

rod
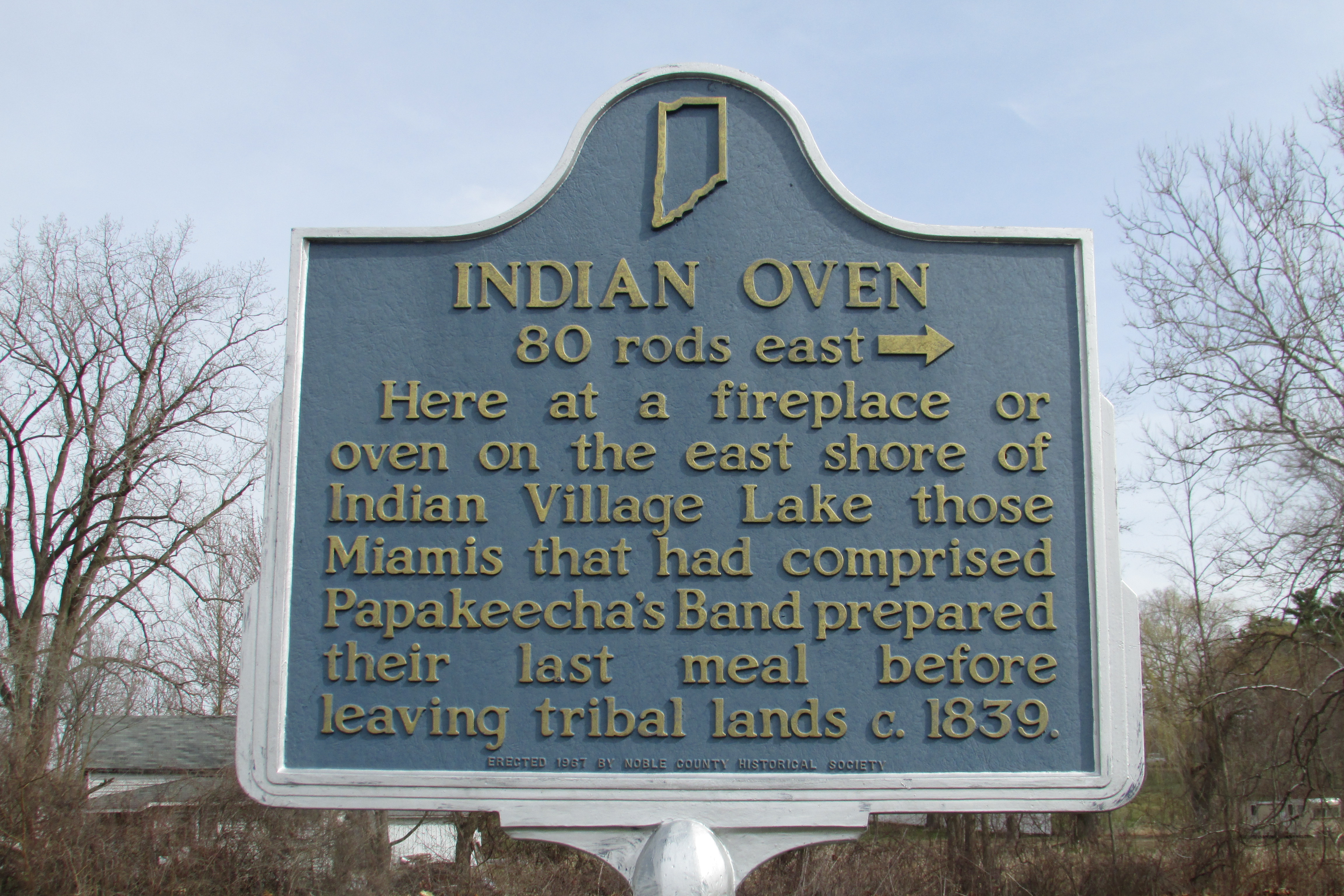
- Sign near a historic site in Indiana, with its location given as "80 rods east", equivalent to roughly 400 m or 1/4 mile.

General information
- Unit system: imperial/US units
- Unit of: length

Conversions
1 rod in ...	... is equal to ...
- Imperial/US units: 16 1/2 ft
- metric (SI) units: 5.0292 m

The rod, perch, or pole (sometimes also lug) is a surveyor's tool and a unit of length with various historical definitions. In British imperial and US customary units, it is defined as 16 1/2 feet, equal to exactly 1/320 of a mile, or 5 1/2 yards (a quarter of a surveyor's chain), and is exactly 5.0292 meters. The rod is useful as a unit of length because integer multiples of it can form one acre of square measure (area). The 'perfect acre' is a rectangular area of 43,560 square feet, bounded by sides 660 feet (a furlong) long and 66 feet (a chain) wide (220 yards by 22 yards) or, equivalently, 40 rods by 4 rods. An acre is therefore 160 square rods or 10 square chains.

The name perch derives from the Ancient Roman unit, the pertica. The measure also has a relationship with the military pike of about the same size. Both measures date from the sixteenth century, when the pike was still utilized in national armies.

The tool has been supplanted, first by steel tapes and later by electronic tools such as surveyor lasers and optical target devices for surveying lands. In dialectal English, the term lug has also been used, although the Oxford English Dictionary states that this unit, while usually of 16 1/2 feet, may also be of 15, 18, 20, or 21 feet.

== History ==
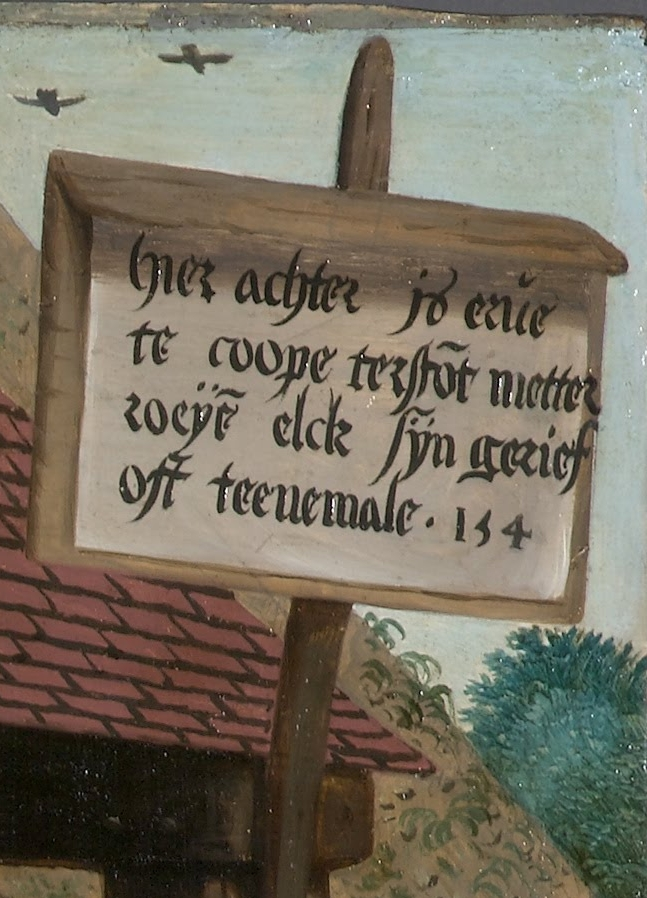
The sign included in Pieter Aertsen's 1551 painting A Meat Stall with the Holy Family Giving Alms reads in Flemish: "behind here are 154 rods of land for sale immediately, either by the rod according to your convenience or all at once".

In England, the perch was officially discouraged in favour of the rod as early as the 15th century; however, local customs maintained its use. In the 13th century, perches were variously recorded in lengths of 18 feet (5.49 m), 20 feet (6.1 m), 22 feet (6.71 m) and 24 feet (7.32 m); and even as late as 1820, a House of Commons report notes lengths of 16 1/2 feet (5.03 m), 18 feet (5.49 m), 21 feet (6.4 m), 24 feet (7.32 m), and even 25 feet (7.62 m). In Ireland, a perch was standardized at 21 feet (6.4 m), making an Irish chain, furlong and mile proportionately longer by 27.27% than the "standard" English measure.

Until English King Henry VIII seized the lands of the Roman Catholic Church in 1536, modern land measures were essentially unknown. Instead a narrative system of landmarks and lists was used. Henry wanted to raise even more funds for his wars than he had seized directly from church property (he had also assumed the debts of the monasteries), and as James Burke writes and quotes in the book Connections that the English monk Richard Benese "produced a book on how to survey land using the simple tools of the time, a rod with cord carrying knots at certain intervals, waxed and resined against wet weather." Benese described the measure of an acre in terms of a perch:

an acre bothe of woodlande, also of fyldlande [heath] is always forty perches in length, and four perches in breadth, though an acre of woodlande be more in quantitie [value, i.e. was more valued commercially] than an acre of fyldelande

The practice of using surveyor's chains, and perch-length rods made into a detachable stiff chain, came about a century later when iron was a more plentiful and common material. A chain is a larger unit of length measuring 66 feet (20.1168 m), or 22 yards, or 100 links, or 4 rods (20.1168 meters). There are 10 chains or 40 rods in a furlong (eighth-mile), and so 80 chains or 320 rods in one statute mile (1760 yards, 1609.344 m, 1.609344 km); the definition of which was legally set in 1593 and popularized by Royal surveyor (called the 'sworn viewer') John Ogilby only after the Great Fire of London (1666).

An acre is defined as the area of 10 square chains (that is, an area of one chain by one furlong), and derives from the shapes of new-tech plows and the desire to quickly survey seized church lands into a quantity of squares for quick sales by Henry VIII's agents; buyers simply wanted to know what they were buying whereas Henry was raising cash for wars against Scotland and France. Consequently, the surveyor's chain and surveyor rods or poles (the perch) have been used for several centuries in Britain and in many other countries influenced by British practices such as North America and Australia. By the time of the industrial revolution, and with surveys for land sales, canals and railways increasing, surveyor rods such as those used by George Washington were generally made of dimensionally stable metal—semi-flexible drawn wrought iron linkable bar stock (not steel) so the four folded elements of a chain were easily transportable through brush and branches when carried by a single man of a surveyor's crew. With a direct ratio to the length of a surveyor's chain and the sides of both an acre and a square (mile), they were common tools used by surveyors, if only to lay out a known plottable baseline in rough terrain thereafter serving as the reference line for instrumental (theodolite) triangulations.

The rod as a survey measure was standardized by Edmund Gunter in England in 1607 as a quarter of a chain (of 66 feet (20.12 m)), or 16 1/2 feet (5.03 m) long.

=== In ancient cultures ===
The perch (pertica) as a lineal measure in Rome (also decempeda) was 10 Roman feet (2.96 metres), and in France varied from 10 feet (perche romanie) to 22 feet (perche d'arpent—apparently 1/10 of "the range of an arrow"—about 220 ft (67 m)). To confuse matters further, by ancient Roman definition, an arpent equalled 120 Roman feet. The related unit of square measure was the scrupulum or decempeda quadrata, equivalent to about 8.76 m^{2} (94.3 sq ft).

=== In continental Europe ===
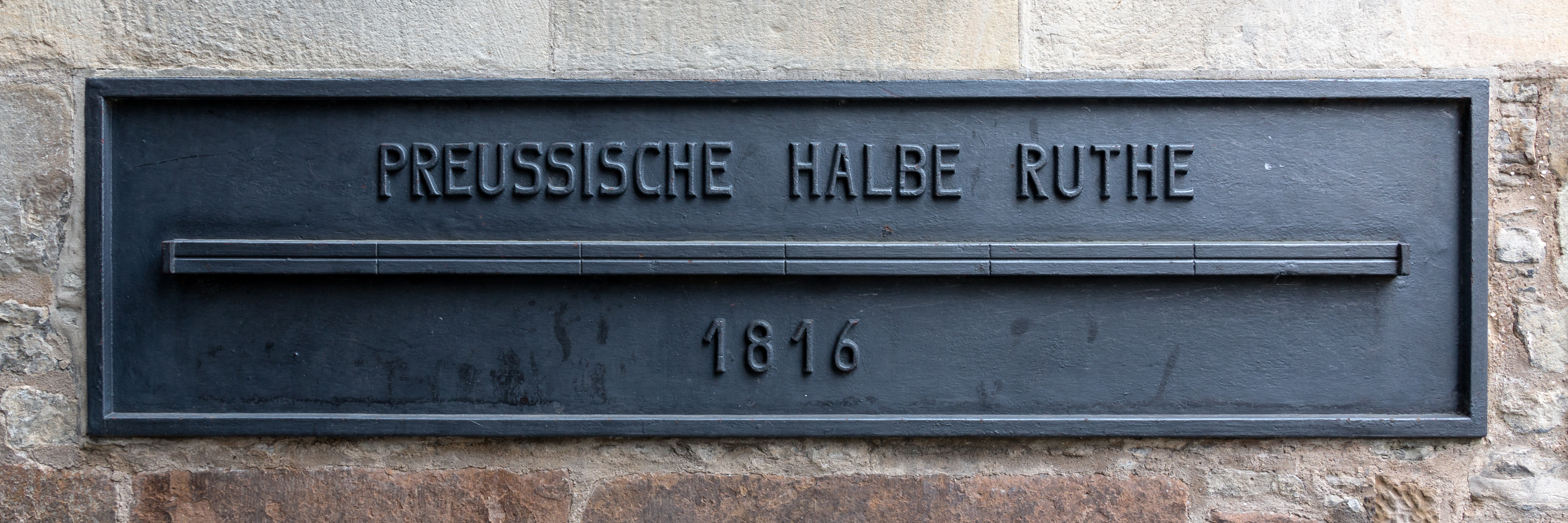
A standard at the City Hall in Münster, Germany, from 1816; the bar shown is one "Prussian Half Rod" (1.883 m) long.

Units comparable to the perch, pole or rod were used in many European countries, with names that include French: perche and canne, German: Ruthe, Italian: canna and pertica, Polish: pręt and Spanish: canna. They were subdivided in many different ways, and were of many different lengths.

Rods and similar units in continental Europe
Place	Local name	Local equivalent	Metric equivalent (meters)
Aachen	Feldmeßruthe	16 Fuß	4.512
Amsterdam	Roede	13 Voet	3.681
Aubenas, Ardèche	canne	8 pans	1.985
Baden, Grand Duchy of	Ruthe	10 Fuß	3.0
Basel, Canton of	Ruthe	16 Fuß	4.864
Bern, Canton of	Ruthe	10 Fuß	2.932
Barcelona	canna	8 palmos	1.581
Braunschweig	Ruthe	16 Fuß	4.565
Bremen	Ruthe	8 Ellen or 16 Fuß	4.626
Brussels	Ruthe	20 Fuß	4.654
Cagliari, Sardinia	canna	10 palmi	2.322
Calenberg Land	Ruthe	16 Fuß	4.677
Cassel, Hessen	Ruthe	14 Fuß	4.026
Denmark	Ruthe	10 Fuß	3.138
Canton of Geneva	Ruthe	8 Fuß	2.598
Hamburg	Geestruthe	16 Fuß	4.583
Hamburg	Marschruthe	14 Fuß	4.010
Hannover	Ruthe	16 Fuß	4.671
France	Perche	3 toises	5.847
France	Perche (for woodland)	3 2/3 toises	7.145
Genoa	canna	10 palmi	2.5
Jever, Oldenburg	Ruthe	20 Fuß	4.377
Mallorca	canna	8 palmos	1.714
Malta	canna	8 palmi	2.08
Mecklenburg	Ruthe	16 Fuß	4.655
Menorca, but not Mahón	canna		1.599
Menorca, city of Mahon	canna	8 palmos	1.714
Messina, Sicily	canna	8 palmi	2.113
Montauban, Tarn-et-Garonne	canne	8 pans	1.783
Morocco	canna	8 palmos	1.714
Naples	canna (for cloth)	8 palmi	
Naples, Kingdom of: Apulia, Calabria, Eboli, Foggia, Lucera	percha	7 palmi	1.838
Naples, Kingdom of: Capua	percha	7 1/5 palmi	1.892
Naples, Kingdom of: Fiano, Naples	percha	7 1/2 palmi	2.014
Naples, Kingdom of: Caggiano, Cava, Nocera, Rocce, Salerno	percha	7 2/3 palmi	1.971
Nuremberg, Bavaria	Ruthe	16 Fuß	4.861
Oldenburg	Ruthe	20 Fuß	5.927
Palermo, Sicily	canna	8 palmi	1.942
Parma	Pertica	6 bracci	3.25
Poland	Pręt	7 1/2 łokci or 10 pręcików	4.320
Prussia, Rheinland	Ruthe	12 Fuß	3.766
Rijnland	Roede	12 Voet	3.767
Rome	canna (for cloth)		2
Rome	canna (for building)		2.234
Saragoza	canna		2.043
Saxony	Ruthe	16 Leipziger Fuß	4.512
Sweden	Ruthe	16 Fuß	4.748
Tortosa	canna		1.7
Tuscany, Grand-Duchy of (Florence, Pisa)	canna	5 bracci	2.918
Uzès, Gard	canne	8 pans	1.98
Waadt, Canton of	Ruthe or toise courante	10 Fuß	3
Württemberg	Reichsruthe	10 Fuß	2.865
Württemberg	old Ruthe	16 Fuß	4.583
Venice, Republic of	Pertica	6 piedi	2.084
Zürich, Canton of	Ruthe	10 Fuß	3.009

=== In Britain and Ireland ===
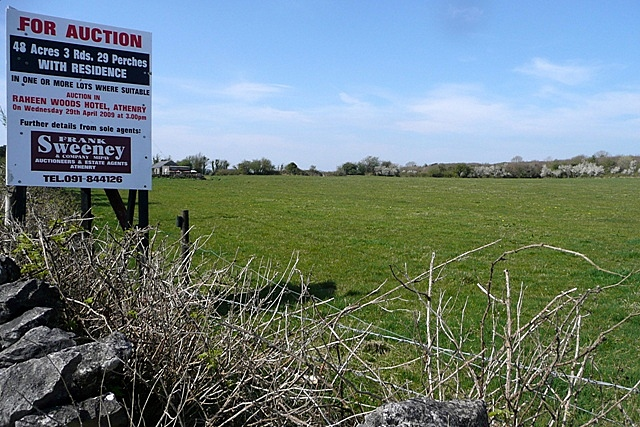
Land for sale in Gortavaura, County Galway, Ireland: the area is 48 acres, 3 roods and 29 perches. In metric units, this is 19.8 hectares.

In England, the rod or perch was first defined in law by the Composition of Yards and Perches, one of the statutes of uncertain date from the late 13th to early 14th centuries: tres pedes faciunt ulnam, quinque ulne & dimidia faciunt perticam (three feet make a yard, five and a half yards make a perch).

The length of the chain was standardized in 1620 by Edmund Gunter at exactly four rods. Fields were measured in acres, which were one chain (four rods) by one furlong (in the United Kingdom, ten chains).

Bars of metal one rod long were used as standards of length when surveying land. The rod was still in use as a common unit of measurement in the mid-19th century, when Henry David Thoreau used it frequently when describing distances in his work, Walden.

In traditional Scottish units, a Scottish rood (ruid in Lowland Scots, ròd in Scottish Gaelic), also fall measures 222 inches (6 ells).

== Modern use and definition ==
The rod was phased out as a legal unit of measurement in the United Kingdom as part of a ten-year metrication process that began on 24 May 1965. In the UK and elsewhere, some vestigial use of the term persists. For example, sizes of allotment gardens continue to be measured in square poles in some areas, sometimes being referred to simply as poles rather than square poles.

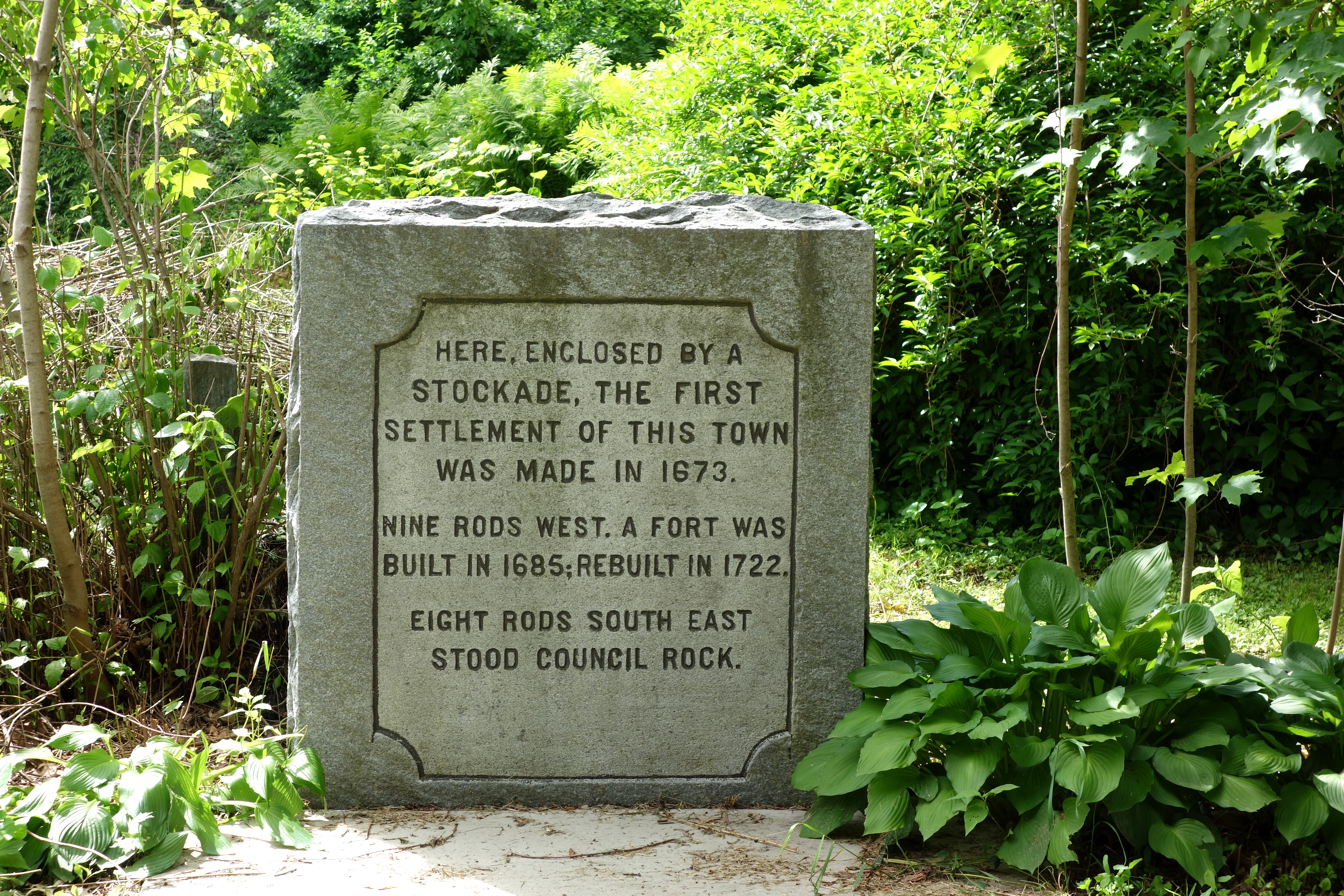
First settlement marker in Northfield, Massachusetts, with the location of a fort and council rock being "9 rods west" and "8 rods south east", respectively.

Despite no longer being in widespread use, the rod is still employed in certain specialized fields. In recreational canoeing, maps measure portages (overland paths where canoes must be carried) in rods; typical canoes are approximately one rod long. The term is also in widespread use in the acquisition of pipeline easements, as the offers for an easement are often expressed on a "price per rod".

In Vermont, the default right-of-way width of state and town highways and trails is three rods (49 ft 6 in, 15.09 m). Rods can also be found on the older legal descriptions of tracts of land in the United States, following the "metes and bounds" method of land survey; as shown in this actual legal description of rural real estate:

LEGAL DESCRIPTION: Commencing 45 rods East and 44 rods North of Southwest corner of Southwest 1/4 of Southwest 1/4; thence North 36 rods; thence East 35 rods; thence South 36 rods; thence West 35 rods to the place of beginning, Manistique Township, Schoolcraft County, Michigan.

In the United States, the rod, along with the chain, furlong, and statute mile (as well as the survey inch and survey foot) were based on the pre-1959 values for United States customary units of linear measurement until 1 January 2023. The Mendenhall Order of 1893 defined the yard as exactly 3600/3937 meters, with all other units of linear measurement, including the rod, based on the yard. In 1959, an international agreement (the international yard and pound agreement), defined the yard as the fundamental unit of length in the Imperial/USCU system, defined as exactly 0.9144 metres. However, the above-noted units, when used in historical surveying, may retain their pre-1959 values, depending on the legislation in each state; the terms are not used in modern surveying (see below) and if they were to be used they would have the values by reference to the international foot.

The U.S. National Geodetic Survey and National Institute of Standards and Technology have recently replaced the definition for the above-mentioned units by the international 1959 definition of the foot, being exactly 0.3048 meters. In the United States until 1 January 2023, the rod was defined in terms of 'survey' feet: it was 16.5 US survey feet which equalled approximately 5.029 210 058 meters; since 1 January 2023 survey feet have been deprecated and the rod formally is defined as exactly 16.5 feet (international feet) or exactly 5.0292 meters.

== Area and volume ==
The terms pole, perch, rod and rood have been used as units of area, and perch is also used as a unit of volume. As a unit of area, a square perch (the perch being standardized to equal 16 1/2 feet, or 5 1/2 yards) is equal to a square rod, 30 1/4 square yards (25.29 square metres) or 1/160 acre. There are 40 square perches to a rood (for example a rectangular area of 40 rods times one rod), and 160 square perches to an acre (for example a rectangular area of 40 rods times 4 rods). This unit is usually referred to as a perch or pole even though square perch and square pole were the more precise terms. Rod was also sometimes used as a unit of area to refer to a rood.

However, in the traditional French-based system in some countries, 1 square perche is 42.21 square metres.

As of August 2013, perches and roods are used as government survey units in Jamaica. They appear on most property title documents. The perch is also in extensive use in Sri Lanka, being favored even over the rood and acre in real estate listings there. Perches were informally used as a measure in Queensland real estate until the early 21st century, mostly for historical gazetted properties in older suburbs.

=== Volume ===
A traditional unit of volume for stone and other masonry. A perch of masonry is the volume of a stone wall one perch (16 1/2 feet or 5.03 metres) long, 18 inches (45.7 cm) high, and 12 inches (30.5 cm) thick. This is equivalent to exactly 24 3/4 cubic feet (0.92 cubic yards; 0.70 cubic metres; 700 litres).

There are two different measurements for a perch depending on the type of masonry that is being built:

1. A dressed stone work is measured by the 24 3/4-cubic foot perch (16 1/2 feet or 5.03 metres) long, 18 inches (45.7 cm) high, and 12 inches (30.5 cm) thick. This is equivalent to exactly 24 3/4 cubic feet (0.916667 cubic yards; 0.700842 cubic metres).
2. a brick work or rubble wall made of broken stone of irregular size, shape and texture, made of undressed stone, is measured by the (16 1/2 feet or 5.03 metres) long, 12 inches (30.5 cm) high, and 12 inches (30.5 cm) thick. This is equivalent to exactly 16 1/2 cubic feet (0.611111 cubic yards; 0.467228 cubic metres).

== See also ==
- Anthropic units
- English units of measurement
