= Gallon (Scots) =

Unit of liquid volume measurement

The Scots gallon (Scottish Gaelic: galan) was a unit of liquid volume measurement that was in use in Scotland from at least 1661 – and possibly as early as the 15th century – until the late 19th century. It was approximately equivalent to 13.568 litres, or very roughly three times larger than the Imperial gallon that was adopted in 1824. A Scots gallon could be subdivided into eight Jougs (or Scots pints, of 1696 mL each), or into sixteen chopins (of 848 mL each).

An ale or beer barrel was 12 Scots gallons (35.81 Imperial gallons [162.816 litres]).

== See also ==
- Obsolete Scottish units of measurement
- Gill
- Mutchkin
