= Forpet =

A forpet, lippie or lippy was a Scottish unit of dry measure equal to a quarter or fourth-part of a peck.

A lippie was so called because a leap was a traditional name for a basket in Scotland.

== See also ==
- Firlot
