= Scottish units of measurement =

Obsolete units of measurement formerly used in Scotland

Scottish or Scots units of measurement are the weights and measures peculiar to Scotland which were nominally replaced by English units in 1685 but continued to be used in unofficial contexts until at least the late 18th century. The system was based on the ell (length), stone (mass), and boll and firlot (volume). This official system coexisted with local variants, especially for the measurement of land area.

The system is said to have been introduced by David I of Scotland (1124–53), although there are no surviving records until the 15th century when the system was already in normal use. Standard measures and weights were kept in each burgh, and these were periodically compared against one another at "assizes of measures", often during the early years of the reign of a new monarch. Nevertheless, there was considerable local variation in many of the units, and the units of dry measure steadily increased in size from 1400 to 1700.

The Scots units of length were technically replaced by the English system by an Act of the Parliament of Scotland in 1685, and the other units by the Treaty of Union with England in 1706. However, many continued to be used locally during the 18th and 19th centuries. The introduction of the Imperial system by the Weights and Measures Act 1824 (5 Geo. 4. c. 74) saw the end of any formal use in trade and commerce, although some informal use as customary units continued into the 20th century. "Scotch measure" or "Cunningham measure" was brought to parts of Ulster in Ireland by Ulster Scots settlers, and used into the mid-19th century.

== Length ==
Scottish inch
The Scottish inch was 25.44 mm, almost the same as the English (and modern international) inch (25.40 mm). A fraudulent smaller inch of 1/42 ell (22.4 mm) is also recorded.
foot (Scots: fit)
12 inches (305.3 mm; compare with the English foot of 304.8 mm).
yard (yaird)
36 inches (915.9 mm; compare with the English yard of 914.4 mm). Rarely used except with English units, although it appears in an Act of Parliament from 1432: "The king's officer, as is foresaid, shall have a horn, and each one a red wand of three-quarters of a yard at least."
Scots ell
The ell (Latin: ulna) was the basic unit of length, equal to 37 inches (941.3 mm). The "Barony ell" of 42 inches (1069 mm) was used as the basis for land measurement in the Four Towns area near Lochmaben, Dumfriesshire.
fall (faw)
6 ells, or 222 inches (5.648 m). Identical to the Scots rod and raip ("rope").
Scots mile
320 falls or 5920 feet or 1973.33 yards (1807 metres), compare with the English mile of 5280 English feet or 1760 yards (approximately 1609 metres), but varied from place to place. Obsolete by the 19th century.

== Area ==
A number of conflicting systems were used for area, sometimes bearing the same names in different regions, but working on different conversion rates. Because some of the systems were based on what land would produce, rather than the physical area, they are listed in their own section. Please see individual articles for more specific information. Because fertility varied widely, in many areas, production was considered a more practical measure.

=== Area by size ===
For information on the squared units, please see the appropriate articles in the length section

- square inch
- square ell
- square fall (faw)
- Scots rood (ruid)
- Scots acre

=== Area by production ===
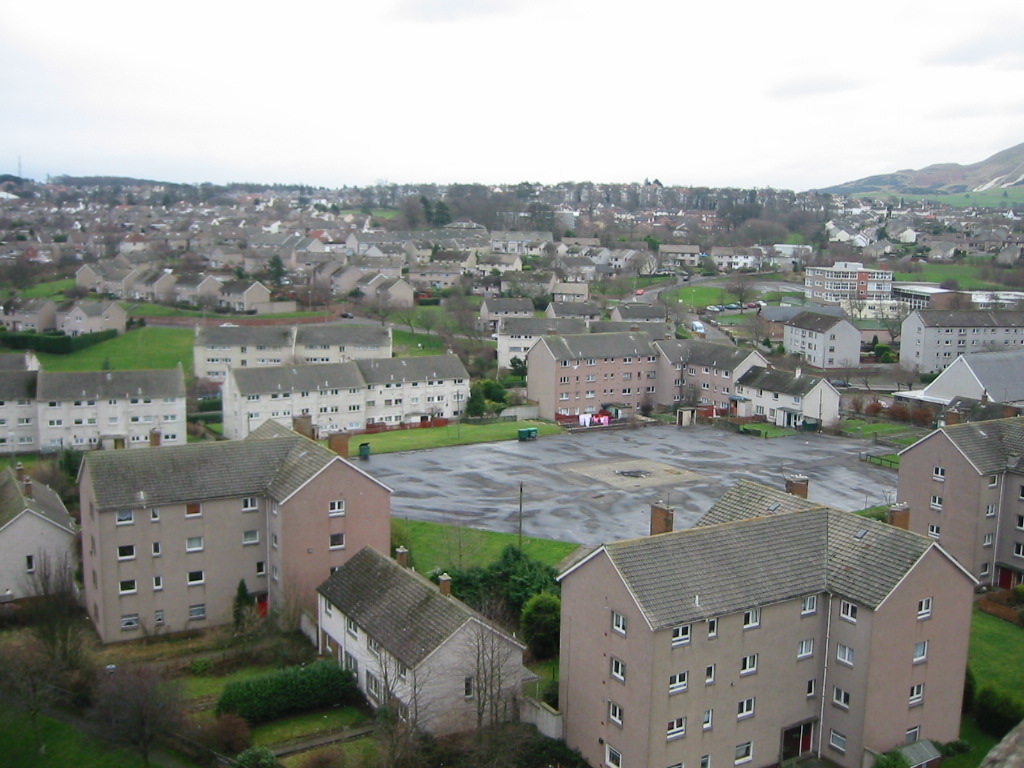
Oxgangs, Edinburgh named after the Scottish unit.

Eastern Scotland:

oxgang (damh-imir)
The area an ox could plough in a year (around 20 acres).
ploughgate (plougate)
8 oxgangs
davoch (dabhach, or dauch)
4 ploughgates

=== Area by taxation/rent ===
In western Scotland, including Galloway:

markland (merkland, marg-fhearann)
8 ouncelands (varied)
ounceland (unceland, tir-unga)
20 pennylands
pennyland (peighinn)
basic unit; sub-divided into halfpenny-land and farthing-land.

Also:

quarterland (ceathramh
Of variable value: one-quarter of a Markland.
groatland (Scottish Gaelic, còta bàn)
Land valued at a groat i.e. four pence

== Volume ==
=== Dry volume ===
Dry volume measures were slightly different for various types of grain, but often bore the same name.

chalder (chauder)
Normally understood as 16 bolls (being just under 12 Winchester quarters)
boll (bowe, or bole)
Equal to 4 firlots.
firlot
peck
lippie, or forpet

These volume measurements were fixed at slightly different sizes at different times. A unified weights and measures system is attributed to David I – though the first written records of this are from the 14th century. The Assize of 1426 made changes to these measures. Then the Assize of 1457 was followed by four major revisions. These involved increases in the size of the firlot, the basic unit of grain measure, and occurred in: c.1500, 1555 (modified in 1563), 1587 and 1618. This last date gave a fixed Scottish system which only changed with the introduction of English measures. An increase in the size of the firlot allowed greater taxation to be raised (as each unit collected was bigger).

Superimposed on this chronological complexity was the difference between the "legal" measures established by the assizes, and the actual measures used in the markets and everyday trade. The "trading" measure could be one sixteenth larger than the "legal" boll, and the "customary" boll a further one sixteenth larger.

Weight equivalents of one boll are given in a trade dictionary of 1863 as follows: Flour 140 pounds; Peas or beans 280 pounds; Oats 264 pounds; Barley 320 pounds; Oatmeal 140 pounds.

=== Fluid volume ===
Standard Measures of Scotland before 1707:
Name	Unit			Metric	Notes
Name	Scottish	US customary	English	equivalent	Notes
gill of spirits			0.761 gill	108.15 ml	6 3/5 cubic inches
gill of ale or beer		0.014 gal		0.053 L	
mutchkin	4 gills	0.056 gal	3 gills	0.212 L	
chopin	4 mutchkins or 16 gills	0.224 gal		0.848 L	Derived from the French measure chopine, from c. 13th century.
pint (Scots) of ale or beer	2 chopins	0.448 gal	3 pints or 1.5 quarts	1.696 L	also known as a joug
pint (Scots) of spirits	2 chopins			473.17 ml	a.k.a. tappit hen
gallon of ale or beer	8 pints	3.584 gal	2.98 (≈3) gallons	13.638 L	
gallon of wine or spirits	8 pints				35 gills in a gallon of spirits
barrel of ale or beer	12 Scots gallons		35.76 (≈36) beer gallons		A standard English ale or beer barrel was 34 gallons.
barrel of wine or spirits	12 Scots gallons		≈36 gallons		
hogshead of ale or beer	18.12 (≈18) Scots gallons		54 gallons		
hogshead of wine or spirits	21.14 (≈21) Scots gallons		63 gallons		

Nipperkin was also used, but perhaps not part of this more formal set.

== Weight ==
Weight was measured according to "troy measure" (Lanark) and "tron measure" (Edinburgh), which were standardised in 1661. In the Troy system these often bore the same name as imperial measures.

- drop (drap)
- ounce (unce)
- pound (pund)
- stone (stane)

Various local measures all existed, often using local weighing stones.

See also the weight meanings of the boll under the dry volume section, above.

== See also ==
- Units of measurement
- Systems of measurement
- History of measurement
- Scottish coinage
- Scottish pronunciation
- Tron

== Bibliography ==
- Collins Encyclopedia of Scotland
- Weights and Measures, by D. Richard Torrance, SAFHS, Edinburgh, 1996, ISBN 1-874722-09-9 (NB book focuses on Scottish weights and measures exclusively)
- Scottish National Dictionary and Dictionary of the Older Scottish Tongue
- Weights and Measures in Scotland: A European Perspective R. D. Connor, et al. National Museum of Scotland and Tuckwell Press, NMSE Publishing, 2004, ISBN 1-901663-88-4
