= Chopin (unit) =

Obsolete Scottish measurement of volume

The chopin was a Scottish measure of volume, usually for fluids, that was in use from at least 1661, though possibly 15th century, until the mid 19th century. The measure was derived from the French measure chopine, a widespread unit of liquid capacity, first recorded in the 13th century. A chopin is equivalent to 0.848 litres.

- 1 chopin is 8 gills
- 1 chopin is 2 mutchkins
- 2 chopins is the equivalent of 1 (Scots) pint (or joug)
- 16 chopins is the equivalent of 1 (Scots) gallon

== See also ==
- Obsolete Scottish units of measurement
