= Italian units of measurement =

Historical units

A variety of units of measurement were used in the various independent Italian states and Italian dependencies of foreign empires up to the unification of Italy in the 19th century. The units to measure length, volume, mass, etc., could differ widely between countries or between towns in a country (e.g. Rome and Ancona), but usually not between a country and its capital.

The Kingdom of Sardinia included the island of Sardinia and the continental areas of Piedmont (with the capital Turin) and Liguria (with Genoa). The Kingdom of Naples included the island of Sicily (with Palermo). The Kingdom of Lombardy–Venetia was part of the Austrian Empire, which also shared ruling family with Modena, Parma and Tuscany (capital Florence). The Papal States included the areas of Latium (with the capital Rome), Umbria, Romagna (with Bologna) and the Marches (with Ancona).

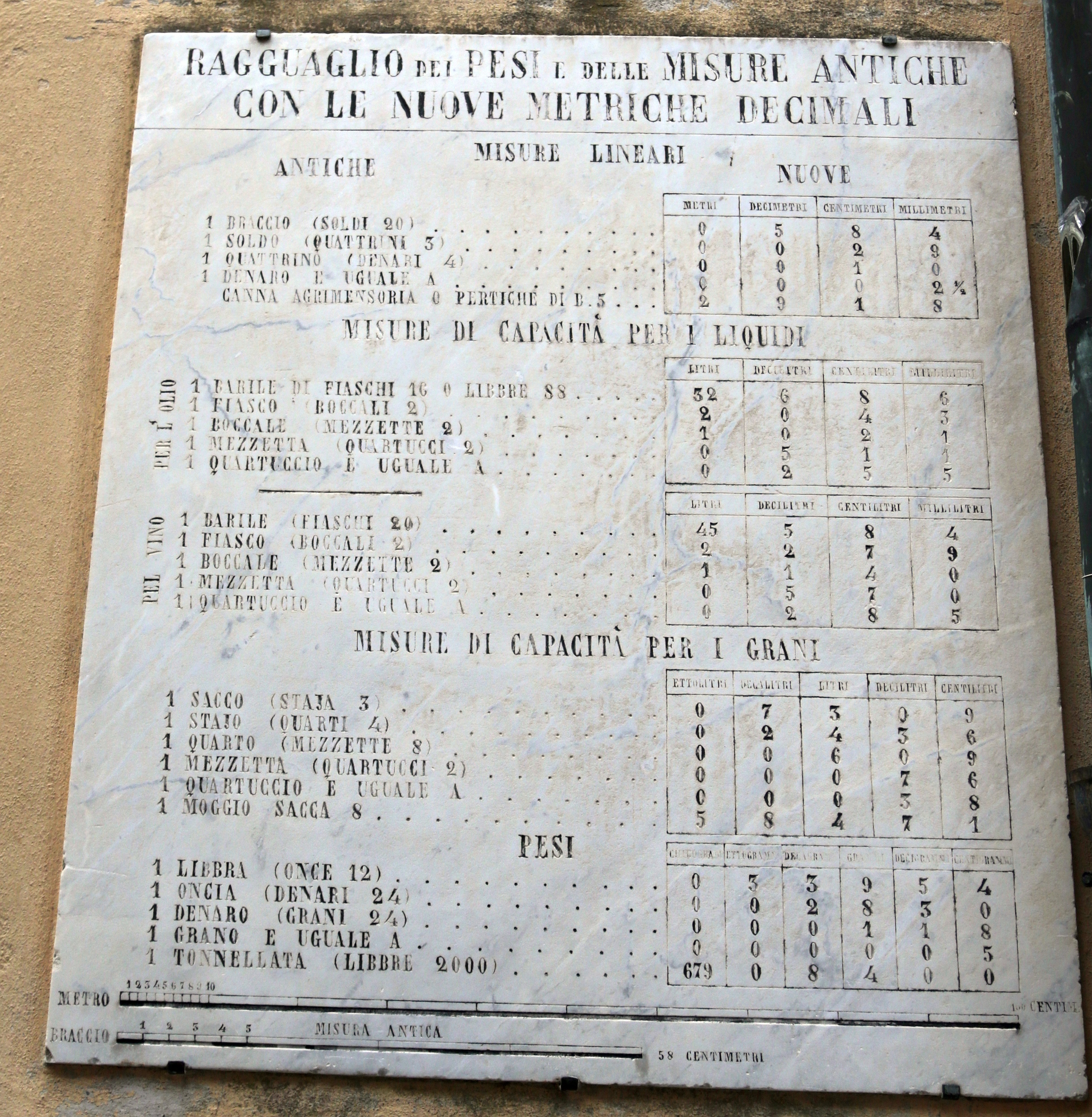
An example of a Tavole di ragguaglio (Conversion Table) in 1860 when Tuscany became part of modern Italy.

Milan adopted the metric system in 1803, during the Napoleonic Wars, albeit reusing names of older units. After the Congress of Vienna, the various Italian states reverted to their original systems of measurements.

In 1845 Sardinia passed legislation to introduce the metric system within five years. In 1859 Lombardy (but not Venetia) was annexed. In 1860 Parma, Modena, Tuscany, Umbria, Romagna and the Marches, and the Two Sicilies (Naples) were assimilated into Sardinia and under the Law 132 of 28 July 28, 1861 the metric system became the official system of measurement throughout the (this year) Italian kingdom. The last to be incorporated were Venetia (1866), and the rest of the Papal States (1870).

For historical Roman measurements, see Ancient Roman units of measurement. The following is a comprehensive list of units used prior to the adoption of the metric system, along with the local names assigned to metric-based units after the system change.

Over time, many traditional unit names were repurposed to denote metric-based units. This practice introduced an additional layer of complexity, making the transition to the metric system unnecessarily cumbersome. These units are marked with ^{€}. They are also placed after the traditional.

== Length ==
Units varied from one province or city to another. In the north the atomo was the smallest unit.

Dedicated use: # architect's † commercial ‡ mercer's

1 piede liprando = 0.51377 m
1 punto (point) = 1/144 piede liprando
1 oncia (inch) = 12 punti
1 piede liprando (foot) = 12 oncie
1 canna = 4 piedi liprando
1 trabucco = 1 1/2 canna
1 miglio (mile) = 4333 1/3 piedi liprando

=== Lombardy–Venetia ===
1 punto = 12 atomi
1 oncia = 12 punti
1 piede = 12 diti (a.k.a. pollici)
1 piede = 435.185 mm
1 braccio = 12 once
1 braccio = 2 piedi

1 miglio^{€} = 1 km

==== Milan ====
1 dito (a.k.a. pollico) = 36.27 mm
1 oncia = 12 punti
1 piede = 12 diti
1 piè = 15.61 in
1 braccio = 12 once = 594.94 mm
1 trabucco = 6 piedi
1 miglio = 3000 braccii = 1784.81 m

1 atomo^{€} = 1 mm
1 dito^{€} = 1 cm
1 palmo^{€} = 1 dm
1 metro^{€} = 1 m

==== Venice ====
1 linea = 10 decimi
1 piede = 348 mm
1 piede = 12 once = 347.735 mm
1 piè = 13.69 in
1 braccio = 683 mm
1 cavezzo = 6 piedi = 2.08641 m
1 miglio = 1000 passi = 1738.67 m

=== Modena ===
1 cavezzo = 6 piedi
1 piè = 20.593 in
1 braccio = 22.741 in

=== Naples ===
1 oncia = 5 minuti
1 decima = 10 centesimi = 26.455 mm
1 palmo = 10 decime = 12 once = 264.55 mm
1 palmo = 10 decime
1 palmo = 12 once = 10.381 in
1 canna = 10 palmi = 2.646 m
1 canna = 10 palmi = 2.6455 m
1 canna^{†} = 8 palmi
1 canna = 8 palmi
1 pertica (a.k.a. passo) = 7 1/2 palmi
1 miglio = 7000 palmi = 1.147 miles
1 miglio = 1000 passi (geographical mile) = 1855.11 m

==== Sicily ====
1 palmo = 9.5297 in
1 canna = 2.06480 m
1 canna = 8 palmi
1 canna = 8 palmi = 2.06479 m
1 cortena = 4 canne
1 corda = 4 cortene = 33.037 m
1 miglio = 45 corde = 1486.66 m

==== Palermo ====
1 canna = 10 palmi = 2.065 m

=== Papal States ===
1 palmo^{#} = 12 once = 8.79 in
1 palmo^{†} = 8.796 in
1 palmo^{‡} = 8.347 in
1 palmo mercantile^{†} = 24.908 cm
1 palmo architettonica^{#} = 22.319 cm
1 palmo d'ara = 12.500 cm
1 once^{#} = 10 decimi
1 pie^{#} (foot) = 16 once = 11.72 in
1 pié = 11.592 in
1 braccia da mercante^{†} = 67 cm
1 braccia par le tele^{‡} = 63.5 cm
1 braccia d'ara = 75 cm
1 canna = 78.4 in
1 canna^{#} = 10 palmi
1 canna^{#} = 7 1/2 piedi = 2.23190 m
1 canna mercantile^{†} = 8 palmi = 1.99263 m
1 canna architettonica^{#} = 10 palmi = 2.2319 m
1 canna d'ara = 9 palmi = 1.125 m
1 catena^{#} = 10 stajoli = 25 1/2 palmi
1 miglio = 1000 passi = 1487.93 m

==== Rome ====
1 oncia^{#} = 10 decimi = 18.6 mm
1 piede = 297.587 mm
1 braccio = 30.732 in
1 canna = 10 palmi = 2.234 m

==== Ancona ====
1 pié = 15.384 in
1 braccio = 35 1/3 in

==== Bologna ====
1 piede = 38 cm
1 braccio = 64 cm

=== Parma ===
1 punto = 12 atomi
1 oncia = 12 punti
1 braccio di legno = 12 once
1 braccio = 21.344 in
1 pertica = 6 braccia
1 piè = 22.428 in

=== Sardinia ===
1 punto = 12 atomi
1 oncia = 12 punti
1 piè liprando = 12 once = 20.228 in
1 canna = 8 palmi = 2.1 m
1 miglio = 4333 1/3 piedi liprando = 1.3835 mile

==== Piedmont ====
1 raso = 14 oncie
1 piede manuale = 2/3 piede liprando
1 piede manuale = 8 once = 342.511 mm
1 trabucco = 6 piedi liprandi = 3.096 m
1 trabucco = 6 piedi liprandi
1 pertica = 2 trabucci
1 pertica = 12 piedi liprandi = 6.16519 m
1 miglio = 800 trabucchi = 2466.08 m

==== Turin ====
1 piede = 293 mm
1 raso = 14 oncie
1 raso = 0.6 m
1 trabucco = 6 piedi liprandi
1 pertica = 2 trabucci

==== Genoa ====
1 palmo = 5 1/3 once
1 palmo = 248 mm
1 piè manuale = 2/3 piè liprando
1 braccio = 2 1/3 palmi
1 braccio = 28 once = 581.22 mm
1 canna = about 9 palmi
1 canna piccola = 9 palmi = 2.24186 m
1 canna = 10 palmi = 2.49095 m
1 canna grossa = 12 palmi = 2.98914 m

=== Tuscany ===
1 quattrino = 4 denari = 9.728 mm
1 soldo = 12 denari
1 palmo = 10 soldi = 11.49 in
1 braccio = 2 palmi
1 canna = 4 braccia
1 canna = 5 braccii = 2.91825 m
1 canna^{#} = 5 braccia
1 canna^{†} = 4 braccia = 2.3346 m
1 canna (a.k.a. percha) = 5 bracchia
1 miglio = 2833 1/3 braccia = 1.0277 mile
1 miglio = 2833 1/3 braccii = 1653.67 m

==== Florence ====
1 braccio = 2 palmi = 583 mm

== Mass ==
One libbra (pound) differed between 307 and 398 g. Several countries used both a light and a heavy pound.

Dedicated use: # gold ∆ silver § jewels † apothecaries' ‡ silk @ spices, drugs and pigments ¥ commercial ¢ oil ship cargoes: Σ grain flour etc § salt

1 grano (grain) = 1/6912 libbra
1 carato = 4 grani
1 tomin = 12 grani
1 denaro (scruple) = 24 grani
1 ottavo (drachm) = 3 denari
1 carato = 6 denaro (a.k.a. scrupolo)
1 oncia (ounce) = 8 ottavi
1 oncia = 4 quarto (quarta)
1 libbra (pound) = 12 oncie
1 rubbo = 25 libbre
1 quintale = 4 rubbi
1 cantaro = 6 rubbi
1 cantaro = 100 rotoli

=== Lombardy–Venetia ===
1 denaro^{#∆} = 24 grani
1 oncia^{#∆} = 24 denari
1 marco^{#∆} = 8 once = 7.5562 troy ounce
1 marco di zecca = 8 once

1 denaro^{€} = 10 grani
1 grosso^{€} = 10 denari
1 oncia^{€} = 10 grossi
1 libbra metrica^{€} = 10 once = 1 kg
1 rubbio^{€} = 10 libbre

==== Milan ====
1 grano^{∆‡} (a.k.a. denaro) = 50.998 mg
1 marco = 234.997 g
1 libbra piccola = 12 once = 326.793 g
1 libbra grossa = 28 once
1 libbra grossa = 28 once = 763 g
1 libbra da olio^{¢} = 32 once
1 rubbio = 8.17 kg
1 fascio = 10 peso = 87.14 kg

1 grano^{€} = 1 dg
1 denar^{€} = 1 g
1 denaro^{€} (from 1803) = 1 g
1 grosso^{€} = 1 dag
1 oncia^{€} = 1 hg
1 libbra nuova^{€} = 1 kg
1 rubbio = 10 kg
1 quintale^{€} = 10 rubbi
1 quintale^{€} = 10 miriagrammi = 100 kg
1 centinajo metrico^{€} (a.k.a. centarello) = 100 kg

==== Venice ====
1 marco = 238.499 g
1 libbra sottile = 301 g
1 libbra sottile = 301.23 g
1 libbra grossa = 12 once = 477 g
1 libbra grossa = 12 once = 476.999 g
1 centinaio sottile = 100 libbre = 30.123 kg
1 centinajo (–1869) = 100 libbre sottile
1 centinajo (–1869) = 100 libbre grossa

==== Trieste ====
Austrian, but not part of Lombardy-Venetia.

1 funto (–1858) = 1 Wiener Pfund
1 centinaji = 100 funti
1 migliajo (–1858) = 10 centinaji

=== Modena ===
1 oncia = 16 ferlini
1 libbra (a.k.a. lira) = 12 once = 0.7044 lb
1 libbra = 340.457 g
1 peso = 25 libbre = 8.2 kg

=== Naples ===
1 scrupolo^{†} = 20 accini
1 trapeso^{#∆‡@} = 20 accini
1 drachma^{†} = 3 scrupoli
1 dramma^{#∆‡@} = 3 trapesi (a.k.a. scrupoli)
1 oncia^{†} = 10 drachme
1 oncia^{#∆‡@} = 10 dramme
1 libbra = 12 once = 0.321 kg
1 libbra = 12 once = 0.70722 lb
1 libbra^{†} = 12 once
1 libbra^{#∆‡@} = 12 once
1 libbra^{‡@} (–1840) = 320.759 g
1 rotolo = 861 g
1 rotolo = 2 7/9 libbre
1 rotolo di puglia = 1000 trappesi = 890.997 g
1 cantaio piccolo (1840 6/4-) = 32.076 kg
1 cantaro = 100 rotoli = 89.100 kg
1 cantaio grosso^{¢} (1840 6/4-) = 89.1 kg

==== Sicily ====
1 taro = 20 grani
1 onza^{#} = 70 tarì = 26.4473 g
1 libbra = 12 oncie = 0.70723 lb
1 rotolo = 30 once = 12 once alla grossa = 793.42 g
1 rottolo sottile = 30 oncie = 1.76 lb
1 rottolo grosso = 38 oncie = 1.925 lb
1 cantaro = 79.15 kg
1 cantaro = 100 rotoli = 79.342 kg

==== Palermo ====
1 libbra = 12 once = 317 g
1 libbra = 317.368 g
1 cantaro = 100 rotoli = 79.34 kg

=== Papal States ===
1 denaro = 24 grani
1 oncia = 24 denari
1 libbra = 12 once
1 centinaio = 100 libbre = 33.907 kg
1 rubbio^{§} = 600 libbre
1 rubbio^{Σ} = 640 libbre
1 rubbio = 720 libbre

==== Rome ====
1 denaro^{∆¥} = 24 grani = 1.178 g
1 oncia = 12 denari
1 libbra = 12 once = 339 g
1 libbra = 6912 grani = 339.072 g
1 libbra = 0.7477 lb
1 decina = 10 libbre = 3.391 kg
1 cantaro (a.k.a. centinajo) (–1870) = 100 libbre
1 cantaro piccolo = 100 libbre = 33.9073 kg
1 cantaro (–1870) = 160 libbre
1 cantaro (–1870) = 250 libbre
1 cantaro grosso (a.k.a. migliajo) (–1870) = 1000 libbre = 339.07 kg

==== Ancona ====
1 libbra = 0.7277
1 rubbo = 25 libbre
1 centinajo = 2/3 cantari
1 centinajo = 4 rubbi = 32.96 kg

==== Bologna ====
1 carato = 4 grani
1 ferlino = 10 carati
1 ferlino = 10 carati = 1.885 g
1 ferlino^{§} = 1.9225 g
1 ottavo = 2 ferlini
1 oncia = 8 ottavi
1 oncia = 16 ferlini
1 libbra mercantile^{¥} = 12 once = 362 g
1 libbra = 0.7984
1 libbra = 12 once
1 libbra^{#∆‡} = 361.851 g
1 peso = 25 libbre = 9.046 kg

==== Ferrara ====
1 ferlino = 10 carati = 1.80 g
1 oncia = 16 ferlini
1 centinajo (–1859) = 34.514 kg

=== Parma ===
1 denaro = 24 grani
1 oncia = 24 denari
1 marco = 234.997 g
1 libbra = 12 once = 0.7197 lb
1 libbra = 328 g
1 rubbio = 25 libbre

=== Sardinia ===
1 grano^{‡} = 53.363 mg
1 denaro^{¥} = 24 grane = 1280.71 mg
1 cantaro = 4 rubbi
1 cantaro di comercio^{¥} = 25 libbre = 10.164 kg
1 cantaro grosso (a.k.a. cantarello) = 26 libbre = 10.5706 kg
1 calpo = 10 cantari grossi

==== Piedmont ====
1 grano = 24 granotini
1 denaro = 24 grani
1 ottavo = 3 denari
1 oncia = 8 ottavi
1 marco = 245.920 g
1 libbra = 12 once = 0.81332 lb
1 libbra^{†} = 1 1/4 marco
1 marco^{#∆} = 2/3 libbra
1 rubbo = 25 libbre = 9.222 kg

==== Turin ====
1 grano = 24 granotini
1 denaro = 24 grani
1 denaro (1853) = 50 mg
1 ottavo = 3 denari
1 oncia = 8 ottavi
1 marco^{#∆} = 2/3 libbra
1 libbra^{†} = 1 1/4 marco
1 libbra (–1818) = 368.88 g
1 libbra = 12 once = 369 g
1 libbra = 12 once = 0.81332 lb
1 rubbio = 9.22 kg

==== Genoa ====
1 denaro = 24 grani
1 oncia = 24 denari
1 libbra = 12 once = 317 g
1 libbra = 12 once = 0.70021 lb
1 libbra (peso grosso) = 12 once = 0.77023 lb
1 libbra peso sottile = 316.75 g
1 libbra peso grosso = 317.664 g
1 rottolo = 1 1/2 libbre
1 rotolo = 18 once = 475.125 g
1 cantaro (–1847) = 6 rubbi
1 cantaro (–1847) = 47.649 kg
1 cantaro grosso = 100 rotoli = 47.650 kg
1 peso (–1847) = 5 cantari
1 rubbio = 7.942 kg
1 mina = 12 rubbi = 95.299 kg

==== Cagliari ====
1 libbra di commercio^{¥} = 406.563 g
1 libbra da orefici = 325.25 g

=== Tuscany ===
1 denaro = 24 grani
1 dramma = 3 denari
1 oncia = 8 dramme
1 libbra = 12 once = 0.7486 lb
1 cantaro comune = 150 libbre = 50.931 kg
1 cantaro (–1861) = 100 libbre = 33.9542 kg
1 migliaio (–1861) = 10 cantari

==== Florence ====
1 libbra = 12 once = 339.5 g
1 libbra = 339.542 g

==== Lucca ====
1 libbra = 334.5 g
1 libbre grosse = 11 libbre mercantile
1 coppo = 24 libbre grosse = 88.308 kg

== Area ==
Dedicated use: # architect's

1 giornata (a.k.a. quadrao) = 38 are
1 tavola = 1/100 giornata

=== Lombardy–Venetia ===
1 tornatura = 100 palmi^{2} = 1 are
1 campo = 0.6881 acre

==== Lombardy ====
1 tavola = 4 trabucchi quadri
1 pertica = 24 tavole = 654.52 m^{2}

==== Venetia ====
1 migliajo = 1000 passi quadrati = 3022.99 m^{2}

=== Modena ===
1 cavezzo^{2} = 36 piedi^{2}
1 tavola = 4 cavezzi^{2}
1 biolca = 72 tavole = 0.7009 acres

=== Naples ===
1 canna quadrata (centesimo) = 6.999 m^{2}
1 decima = 10 centesimi = 69.987 m^{2}
1 decima = 10 canne quadrate
1 moggio = 10 decime
1 moggio = 50,626 palmi^{2} = 0.8684 acre
1 moggio = 10 decime = 699.87 m^{2}

==== Sicily ====
1 canna (quartiglio) = 4.263 m^{2}
1 mondelli = 1024 canne quadrate
1 bisaccia = 16 mondelli = 4365.72 m^{2}

=== Papal States ===
1 scorzo = 28 catene agrimensorie
1 quarta = 4 scorzi = 4621.19 m^{2}
1 rubbio = 370300 palmi^{2} ^{#} = 4.5658 acres
1 rubbio = 184.8438 ar

=== Parma ===
1 staro = 12 tavola
1 biolca = 6 stari = 0.7528 acre
1 biolca = 288 pertica^{2}

=== Sardinia ===
==== Piedmont ====
1 giornata = 100 pertica^{2} = 0.9393 acre
1 giornata = 100 tavole = 38.01 ar
1 giornata = 100 tavole = 3800.96 m^{2}

=== Tuscany ===
1 saccato = 16500 braccia^{2} = 1.389 acre

== Volume (dry) ==
Dry and wet capacity (volume) were usually two separate systems, but a few units were universally handled, mostly in countries that had had experience with the metric system. (One of the sources do not state what subsystem they are handling).

Dedicated use: # firewood † grain ‡ salt ∆ oats and legumes Σ coal

One mina varied from 12 to 120 litres.

=== Lombardy–Venetia ===
1 pinta^{€} = 10 coppi = 1 litre
1 mina^{€} = 10 pinte
1 soma^{€} = 10 mine

==== Venice ====
1 moggio = 8 mezzeni = 333.3 litres

==== Milan ====
1 moggio = 8 stala = 146.2 litres
1 soma^{∆} = 164.51 L

1 coppo^{€} = 1 dl
1 pinta^{€} = 1 L
1 mina^{€} = 1 dal
1 soma^{€} = 1 hl

=== Modena ===
1 stajo = 1.9978 bushels
1 sacco = 2 staja

=== Naples ===
1 quarto (–1840) = 6 misuri
1 mezzetta = 2 quarte = 27.77 L
1 mezzetto (–1840) = 2 quarti = 27.66 L
1 tomolo = 55.54 litres
1 tomolo = 24 misure = 1.5646 bushels
1 carro = 36 tomoli
1 canna da legna^{#} = 256 cubic palmi = 4.74 m^{3}

==== Sicily ====
1 salma generale = 7.8 bushels
1 salma grosso = 10 bushels

==== Palermo ====
1 salma = 4 bisace = 275 litres
1 salma = 16 tomoli

=== Papal States ===
1 scorzo = 4 quartucci
1 starello = 1 3/8 scorzi
1 quarta = 4 starelli
1 rubbio = 4 quarte
1 rubbio^{∆} = 249.458 L
1 rubbio = 294.465 L

==== Rome ====
1 decina^{†‡} = 4.601 L
1 staro = 4 decine
1 rubbio = 8.355 bushels
1 rubbio = 22 scorzi = 294.5 litres

==== Ancona ====
1 rubbio = 7.974 bushels

==== Bologna ====
1 quarterone = 4 quarticini
1 stajo = 4 quarteroni
1 corba (dry and liquid) = 2 staja
1 corba (dry and liquid) = 2.232 bushels
(20.7617 gallons, liquid)
1 corba = 2 staia = 60 boccali = 78.6 litres

=== Parma ===
1 mina = 8 quarteroli
1 stajo (a.k.a. staro) = 2 mine = 1.334 bushels

=== Piedmont ===
1 coppo^{†} = 2.876 L
1 emine^{#} = 23.006 L
1 sacco^{#} = 5 emine = 115.027 L
1 sacco^{#} (1818–) = 5 emine = 115,275 L
1 sacco camerale = 6 emine

==== Turin ====
1 copello = 20 cucchiari
1 quartière = 4 copelli
1 mina = 2 quartière
1 stajo = 2 mine
1 sacco = 3 staje = 3.2635 bushels
1 sacco = 5 mine = 115.3 litres

==== Genoa ====
1 gombetta = 4 misurette = 1.21 L
1 quarto = 12 gombette
1 mina = 8 quarti = 2.4804 gallons
1 mina = 116.5 litres
1 mina^{†} = 116.532 L
1 sacco^{Σ} = 3 misure (coppi) = 157.75 L

=== Tuscany ===
1 quartuccio = 2 bussoli
1 mezzetta = 2 quartucci
1 mezzetta = 2 quartucci = 0.761 L
1 metadella = 2 mezzette
1 quarto = 4 metadelle
1 mina = 2 quarti
1 stajo = 2 mine
1 sacco = 3 staja
1 sacco^{#} = 3 staja = 73.09 L
1 moggio = 8 sacci = 16.5904 bushels
1 moggio = 8 sacci^{#}

==== Florence ====
1 moggio = 8 sacca = 584.7 litres

== Volume (liquids) ==
There are also a unit cantara: no specifics.

Dedicated use: # wine † spirits ‡ oil

1 barile da vino^{#} = 45.6 L
1 barile da olio^{‡} = 33.4 L

=== Lombardy–Venetia ===
1 pinta^{€} = 10 coppi = 1 litre
1 mina^{€} = 10 pinte
1 soma^{€} = 10 mine

==== Venice ====
1 quartuccio = 4 gotti = 670.7 mL 1 barile^{#†} = 24 bozze = 64.386 L

==== Milan ====
1 mezzo = 2 zaine (bicchieri) = 393.5 mL
1 boccale = 2 mezzi
1 boccale = 0.787 L
1 quartaro = 4 pinte
1 mina (secchia) = 2 quartari = 12.592 L
1 brenta = 96 boccali = 75.6 litres
1 brenta = 75.554 L

1 coppo^{€} = 1 dl
1 pinta^{€} = 1 L
1 mina^{€} = 1 dal
1 soma^{€} = 1 hl

==== Trieste ====
1 boccale = 1.83 L

=== Modena ===
1 fiasco = 2 boccali = 0.55028 gallon
1 fiasco^{#} = 2 boccali = 2.083 L
1 barile = 20 fiasci

=== Naples ===
1 barile^{#†} = 60 caraffi
1 botta^{#†} = 12 barile
1 botte^{#†} = 12 barili = 523.5 litres
1 carro^{#†} = 2 botti
1 caraffa = 3 bicchieri = 0.7271 L
1 caraffa^{#†} = 0.1929 gallons
1 quarto^{‡} = 6 misurelle
1 stajo^{‡} = 16 quarti = 2.61633 gallons
1 stajo^{‡} = 20 pignate
1 salma^{‡} = 16 staja
1 barile^{#†} = 43.625 L

==== Sicily ====
1 quartuccio = 4 bicchieri = 0.8597 L
1 salma = 22 gallons
1 barile^{#†} = 34.386 L

=== Papal States ===
1 foglietta = 4 quartucci
1 foglietta = 4 quartucci (cartocci)
1 boccale = 1.8232 L
1 boccale = 4 fogliette
1 barile = 32 boccale
1 barile^{#} = 15.412 gallon
1 barile^{‡} = 15.185 gallon
1 botte = 16 barile

==== Rome ====
1 fogliette = 4 quartucci
1 foglietta^{#} = 456 mL
1 mezzo = 2 fogliette = 911.6 mL
1 boccale = 2 mezzi
1 boccale^{#} = 4 fogliette = 1.823 L
1 boccale^{‡} = 1/4 cugnatella = 2.053 L
1 soma = 43.386 gallons
1 barile^{#†} = 32 boccali = 58.342 L
1 barile = 32 boccali = 75.5 litres
1 brenta = 175.023 L
1 soma^{#} = 116,683 L
1 soma^{‡} = 164,23 L
1 botte = 8 some

==== Ancona ====
1 soma = 18.49 gallons

==== Bologna ====
1 foglietta^{#} = 327 mL
1 boccale = 4 fogliette
1 boccale = 0.346 gallon
1 boccale = 1.31 L
1 quarterone = 15 boccale
1 corba = 4 quarterone
1 corba = 2 staia = 60 boccali = 78.6 litres

=== Parma ===
See Lombardy–Venetia and Milan.

=== Sardinia ===
==== Piedmont ====
1 boccale = 2 quartini
1 pinta = 2 boccali
1 pinta = 4 quartini = 1.3696 L
1 pinta (–1818) = 2 boccale = 1.369 L
1 rubbio = 6 pinte = 2.4804 gallons
1 brenta = 6 rubbi
1 carro = 10 brente

==== Turin ====
1 boccale = 2 quartini
1 boccale = 0.68 L
1 pinta = 2 boccali
1 rubbio = 6 pinte = 2.4804 gallons
1 brenta = 6 rubbi
1 brenta = 49.285 L
1 carro = 10 brente
1 carro = 10 brente = 493.11 litres

==== Genoa ====
1 amola = 4 quarti = 0.8833 L
1 barile = 90 amole
1 barile = 50 pinte = 17.084 gallons
1 barile = 70 litres
1 barile^{#†} = 79.02 L
1 mezzaruòla = 2 barilli

=== Tuscany ===
1 mezzetta^{#} = 2 quartucci
1 mezzetta^{†} = 2 quartucci = 0.57 L
1 mezzetta^{‡} = 2 quartucci = 0.522 L
1 boccale^{#} = 2 mezzette
1 boccale = 4 quartucci = 1.1396 L
1 fiasco^{#} = 2 boccale
1 fiasco^{#} = 2 boccali = 2.279 L
1 barile^{#} = 20 fiasci = 12.0444 gallons = 133 1/3 libbre (weight)
1 barile^{†} = 20 fiasci = 12.0444 gallons = 120 libbre (weight)
1 barile^{‡} = 16 fiasci = 120 libbre (weight)
1 soma^{‡} = 2 barile

==== Florence ====
1 boccale = 1.14 L
1 barile^{#} = 20 fiaschi = 45.6 litres
1 barile^{‡} = 16 fiaschi = 33.43 litres
