= Rood (unit) =

Unit of area equal to a quarter of an acre

rood
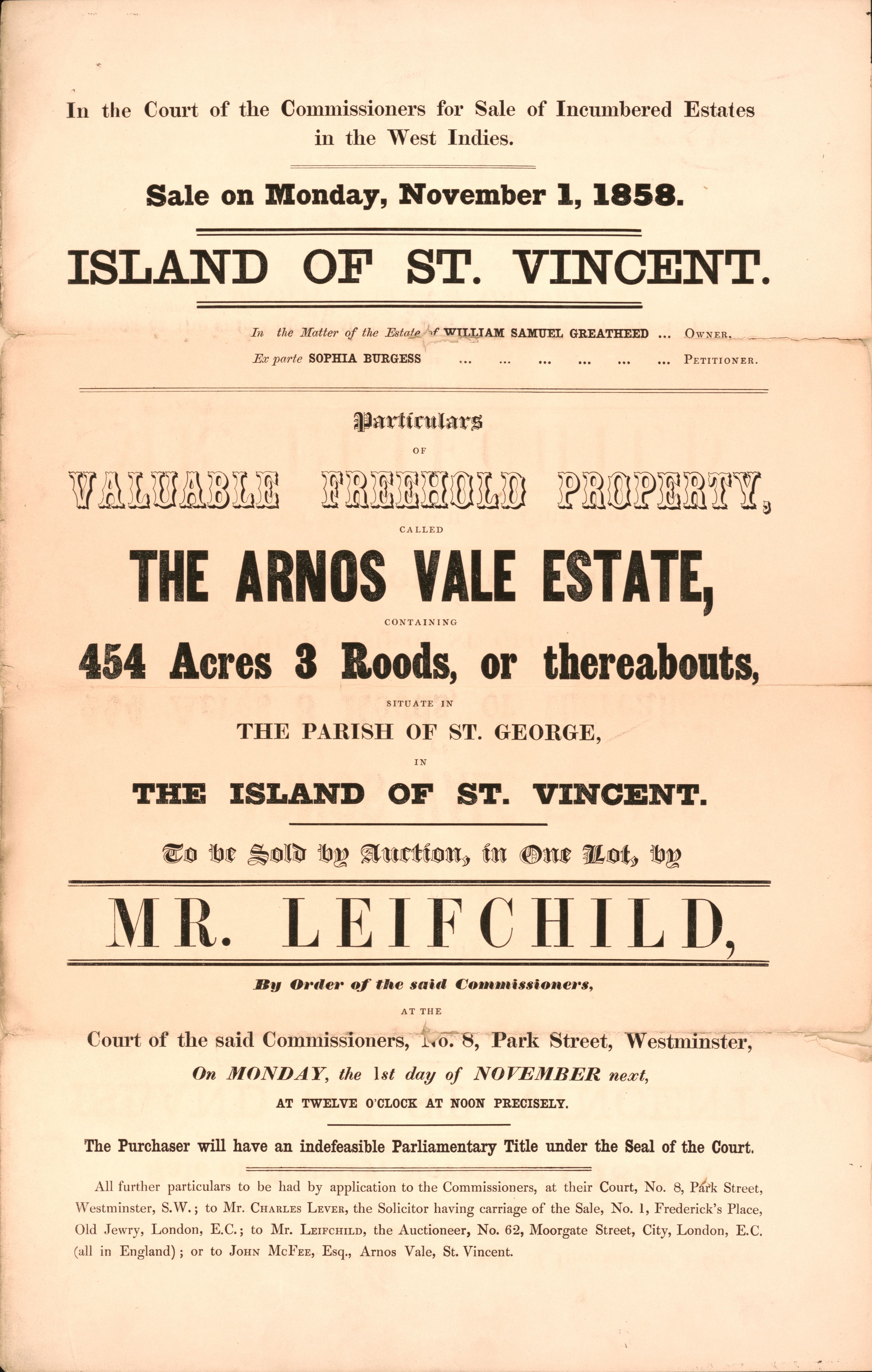
- Estate for sale on St Vincent, with area given as 454 acres 3 roods (i.e. 454 3/4 acres).

General information
- Unit system: Imperial units
- Unit of: area

Conversions
1 rood in ...	... is equal to ...
- SI base units: 1011.7141056 m^{2}
- acre: 1/4 acre
- square feet: 10890 ft^{2}

A rood (/ˈruːd/; abbreviation: ro) is a historic English and international inch-pound measure of area, as well as an archaic English measure of length.

== Etymology ==
Rood is an archaic word for "pole", from Old English rōd "pole", specifically "cross", from Proto-Germanic *rodo, cognate to Old Saxon rōda, Old High German ruoda "rod"; the relation of rood to rod, from Old English rodd "pole", is unclear; the latter was perhaps influenced by Old Norse rudda "club".

In Normandy, where the rood was also used (before being replaced by metric units around 1800), it was known as a vergée, from the French word verge (stick, rod), which was borrowed in English (see virge).

== Measurement of area ==
Comparison of 1 rood (unit) with some Imperial and metric units of area

Rood is an English unit of area equal to one quarter of an acre or 10,890 square feet, exactly 1,011.7141056 m^{2}. A rectangle that is one furlong (i.e., 10 chains, or 40 rods) in length and one rod in width is one rood in area, as is any space comprising 40 perches (a perch being one square rod). The vergée was also a quarter of a Normandy acre, and was equal to 40 square perches (1 Normandy acre = 160 square perches).

The rood was an important measure in surveying on account of its easy conversion to acres. When referring to areas, rod is often found in old documents and has exactly the same meaning as rood.

== Linear measure ==
A rood is also an obsolete British unit of linear measure between 16 1/2 and 24 feet (5.0–7.3 m). It is related to the German Rute and the Danish rode. The original OED of 1914 said this sense was "now only in local use, and varying from 6 to 8 yards" (or 18 to 24 ft, "Rood", II.7).

== See also ==
- Rood (Scots)
- Rood screen
- List of obsolete units of measurement
