= John Ramsey (died 1551) =

English prior of Merton and religious pamphleteer

- Born: 1496?
- Died: 1551
- Occupations: Prior of Merton and religious pamphleteer

John Ramsey, or John Ramsay, (1496?–1551) was an English prior of Merton and religious pamphleteer.

== Biography ==
Ramsey was born about 1496. He was possibly son of John Ramsay (d. 1515), rector of Brabourne, Kent. He joined the college of canons regular at New Inn Hall, Oxford, and graduated B.A. in 1513–14 and B.D. in 1522. He was afterwards successively prior of St. Mary's College, Oxford (about 1528), and of Merton Abbey, Surrey. To the latter office he was elected on 31 January 1530. In 1537 Thomas Paynell dedicated to him his translation of Erasmus's ‘Of the Comparation of a Virgin and a Martyr,’ which he had undertaken at Ramsay's request. Ramsay adopted reforming principles, and resigned his priory before the dissolution of the monasteries. The abbey was surrendered in 1538 by another prior, John Bowle (Dugdale, Monasticon, vi. 246).

Before 1545 Ramsay became rector of Woodchurch (Deanery of Lympne, Kent), and died in possession of the rectory in 1551 (Hasted, Kent, iii. 111).

Ramsay wrote:

- ‘A Corosyfe to be layed hard unto the Hartes of all Faythfull Professours of Christes Gospel, gathered out of the Scriptures by John Ramsay,’ 12mo, no place or date. But at the close of the work it prays for Edward VI, and ‘for the laws permitting the liberty of Christ's Gospel.’ It was therefore published some time between 1548 and 1551; it is Protestant and evangelical in tone.
- ‘A Communication or a Dialogue between a Poor Man and his Wife, wherein thou shalt find Godly Lessons for thy Instruction,’ 8vo, without date or place (see Tanner, Bibl. Brit.)
