= Thomas Paynell =

English Augustinian and translator

- Occupations: Augustinian and translator

Thomas Paynell (fl. 1528–1564) was an English Augustinian and translator.

== Biography ==
Paynell was an Austin friar. He was educated at Merton Abbey, Surrey, where he became a canon. He then proceeded to the college of St. Mary the Virgin, Oxford, which was designed for the education of the canons of certain Augustinian houses, of which Merton was one (Wood, City of Oxford, ed. Clark, ii. 228–9). He subsequently returned to Merton, and devoted himself to literary and medical studies. His first book, an edition of the ‘Regimen Sanitatis Salerni,’ appeared in 1528, and from that date Paynell's activity as a translator was incessant. In 1530 a Thomas Paynell was admitted member of Gray's Inn (Foster, Register, p. 8). On 13 April 1538 Merton Abbey surrendered to the crown, and its inmates received pensions. Paynell accepted 10l. per annum. On 16 October in the same year Paynell was licensed to export from England five hundred woollen cloths, and in December he was despatched, with Christopher Mount, on a mission to the protestant princes of Germany; he was present at the diet of Frankfort on 12 February 1539 (State Papers Henry VIII, i. 604–6, 609, 614). Before 1541 he had become chaplain to Henry VIII, perhaps as a reward for diplomatic services. He seems to have escaped molestation on account of his religious opinions, and remained in favour with Edward VI, Mary, and Elizabeth, to all of whom he dedicated books. Among others to whom his dedications are addressed were Mary (1496–1533), queen-dowager of France, John de Vere, fifteenth earl of Oxford, Anthony Browne, first viscount Montague, the lord chamberlain, and William Blount, fourth lord Mountjoy He was also an intimate friend of Alexander Barclay, the author of the ‘Ship of Fools.’ He is probably the Thomas Paynell who resigned the living of St. Dionys, Lime Street, London, on 13 Feb. 1549–50 (Strype, Eccl. Mem. ii. ii. 261), and succeeded his friend Richard Benese at All Hallows, Honey Lane, which he resigned before 21 Feb. 1560–1. His will was proved 22 Mar. 1564. The latest mention of him appears in the ‘Stationers' Register’ in December or January 1567–8.

The translator's works are:

- ‘Regimen Sanitatis Salerni. This boke techyng al people to governe them in helthe is translated out of the Latyne tonge in to englyshe by T. Paynell,’ T. Berthelet, London, 1528, 4to. The British Museum copy contains a few manuscript notes; the work consists of the ‘Regimen’ which was originally compiled by Joannes de Mediolano, and dedicated to Robert, duke of Normandy, who stayed at Salerno for the cure of a wound received in Palestine, and of a commentary by Arnaldus of Villa Nova, but only the commentary is in English; it is dedicated to John de Vere, fifteenth earl of Oxford. Other editions appeared in 1530, 1535, 1541, 1557, 1575, and 1634. The British Museum has copies of all these editions, and the Britwell Library of the earlier ones.
- ‘The preceptes teachyng a prynce or a noble estate his duetie, written by Agapetus in Greke to the emperour Justinian, and after translated into Latin, and nowe to Englysshe by T. Paynell,’ T. Berthelet, London [1532?], 8vo (Brit. Museum and Britwell). It is undated, but the dedication to ‘my lorde Montjoy, lord-chamberlaine to the queene,’ i.e. William Blount, fourth lord Mountjoy, lord chamberlain to Queen Catherine, places it before his death in 1534, and probably before the divorce proceedings. Another edition, dated 1563, and bound with Ludovicus Vives's ‘Introduction to Wisdom,’ translated by Sir Richard Morison, is in the Britwell Library (cf. Lowndes, i. 18).
- Erasmus's ‘De Contemptu Mundi, translated in to englysshe’ [by T. Paniell], T. Berthelet, London, 1533, 16mo (Brit. Mus.); another edition, undated and perhaps earlier, is in the Britwell Library. It is dedicated to Mary, queen-dowager of France, to whom Paynell describes himself as ‘your daily oratour.’
- Ulrich von Hutten's ‘De Morbo Gallico’ [translated into English by T. Paynell], T. Berthelet, London, 1533, 8vo (Brit. Mus.) Another edition appeared in 1730 (Brit. Mus.) This work is, except the title-page, identical with ‘Of the wood called Guaiacum, that healeth the Frenche Pockes …’ [translated by T. Paynell], T. Berthelet, London, 1536, 8vo (Brit. Mus. and Britwell). Other editions appeared in 1539 and 1540 (Brit. Mus.)
- ‘A moche profitable treatise against the pestilence, translated into ēglyshe by Thomas Paynel, chanon of Martin Abbey,’ T. Berthelet, London, 1534, 12mo (Brit. Mus.)
- Erasmus's ‘Comparation of a Vyrgin and a Martyr,’ T. Berthelet, London, 1537, 12mo, dedicated to John Ramsay, prior of Merton, at whose request Paynell undertook the translation. The only known copy is in the Lambeth Library (Maitland, Early Printed Books in the Lambeth Library, p. 199; cf. Lowndes, i. 750; Ames, ed. Herbert, i. 429; Maunsell, p. 47; Dibdin, iii. 297).
- ‘A Sermon of St. Cyprian made on the Lordes Prayer,’ T. Berthelet, London, 1539, 8vo (Brit. Mus. and Britwell), dedicated to Sir Anthony Denny
- ‘The Conspiracie of Lucius Catiline, translated into englishe by Thomas Paynell, worthy, profitable, and pleasaunt to be read,’ T. Berthelet, 1541 (Britwell and Huth), dedicated to Henry VIII. Another edition, with Barclay's translation of Sallust's ‘Iurgutha,’ revised by Paynell, was published by J. Waley in 1557, 4to, and dedicated to Anthony Browne, viscount Montagu (Brit. Mus.)
- ‘A compēdious [&] moche fruytefulle treatyse of well livynge, cōtaynyng the whole sume … of all vertue. Wrytten by S. Bernard [&] translated by T. Paynell,’ T. Petyt, London [1545?], 16mo (Lambeth and Brit. Mus.); dedicated to the Lady Mary.
- ‘The Piththy and moost notable sayinges of al Scripture gathered by T. Paynell, after the manner of common places …’ T. Gaultier, London, 1550, 8vo; dedicated to the Lady Mary. Copies are in the British Museum, Britwell, and Bodleian libraries (cf. Strype, Eccl. Mem. i. i. 75, II. i. 415). Another edition, ‘newly augmēted and corrected,’ was published in the same year by W. Copland for R. Jugge (Britwell and Brit. Mus.), and a third in 1560 by W. Copland.
- ‘The faythfull and true storye of the Destruction of Troy, compyled by Dares Phrygius …’ John Cawood, London, 1553, 8vo (Bodleian) (cf. Hazlitt, Handbook, p. 140; Wood, Athenæ, i. 340).
- ‘The Pandectes of the Evangelicall Law, comprisyng the whole Historye of Christes Gospell,’ Nycolas Hyll for Wyllyam Seres and Abraham Vele, 1553, 8vo (Britwell).
- ‘The office and duetie of an husband made by the excellēt Philosopher, L. Vives, and translated into Englyshe by T. Paynell,’ J. Cawood, London [1553], 8vo (Brit. Mus. and Britwell). The date is determined by the dedication to ‘Sir Anthony Browne,’ who was created Viscount Montagu on 2 Sept. 1554; it refers to his intention to marry again (his first wife died on 22 July 1552), and Cawood is described as printer to the ‘Queenes highnesse’ (i.e. Queen Mary).
- ‘Certaine godly and devout prayers made in latin by the reverend father in God, Cuthbert Tunstall, bishop of Durham,’ London, John Cawoode, 1558, 12mo (Brit. Mus.); dedicated to Queen Mary.
- ‘The Complaint of Peace …’ Jhon Cawoode, 1559, 8vo (Brit. Mus. and Britwell); translation of Erasmus's ‘Querela Pacis,’ reprinted in 1802.
- ‘The Civilitie of Childehoode, with the discipline and institution of children … translated out of Frenche,’ John Tisdale, 1560, 8vo (Hazlitt, Collections, i. 101); apparently a version of Erasmus's ‘De civilitate morum puerilium libellus,’ which was translated into English by Udall in 1542.
- ‘The Ensamples of Vertue and Vice gathered out of holye scripture … By N. Hanape. And Englyshed by T. Paynell,’ John Tisdale [1561], 8vo; dedicated to Queen Elizabeth (cf. ARBER, i. 153) (Brit. Mus. and Britwell).
- ‘A frutefull booke of the common places of all St. Pauls Epistles … sette foorthe by T. Paniell,’ J. Tisdale, 1562, 8vo (Brit. Mus., Bodleian, and Britwell); dedicated to Thomas Argall.
- ‘The moste excellent and pleasaunt booke entituled ‘The treasurie of Amadis of Fraunce … translated out of Frenche,’ Thomas Hacket [1568], 4to (Brit. Mus. without title-page). The ‘Stationers' Register’ for 1567–8 assigns the authorship to ‘Thomas Pannell.’ Paynell also edited and wrote a preface for Richard Benese's ‘Boke of Measurynge of Lande’ [1537?], 4to; other editions were 1540? 1562, and 1564?

He likewise supplied a table for the 1557 edition of the works of Sir Thomas More. Other works which Wood and Bale attribute to him have not been identified.

Paynell is confused by Wood, Cooper, and others with a contemporary Thomas Paynell or Parnell, apparently one of the Paynells of Lincolnshire, who was born at Boothby Pagnell or Paynell, and educated at Louvain under Robert Barnes, then an Augustinian friar. When Barnes became prior of the Austin friars at Cambridge, Paynell went thither with him, and together ‘they made the house of the Augustinians very famous for good and godly literature’ (Athenæ Cantabr. i. 78). It may be he who was in the king's service at Boston in 1538, and wrote to Cromwell certifying the suppression of the friars' houses there, and urging the application of the building materials to the repair of the haven and town (Ellis, Original Letters, 3rd ser. iv. 170–2). A third Thomas Paynell studied at St. Bernard's (afterwards St. John's) College, Oxford, became rector of Cottingham, near Beverley, Yorkshire, and left benefactions to the place by will, which was proved at the prerogative court of Canterbury on 22 March 1563–4 (Wood, Athenæ Oxon. i. 337–40). A Nicholas Paynell of Yorkshire was elected fellow of Pembroke College, Cambridge, in 1515, and subsequently became public lecturer in mathematics (Strype, Eccl. Mem. i. i. 75).
