= Joug =

The joug or Scots pint or Scottish pint (Scottish Gaelic: pinnt) was a Scottish unit of liquid volume measurement that was in use from at least 1661 – possibly as early as the 15th century – until the early 19th century, approximately equivalent to 1696 mL or roughly three imperial pints.

The standard was held at Stirling and thereby called the Stirling Jug. It went astray in 1745 and its loss was hidden by replacement by a standard pewter jug of roughly the same size. The error was discovered by Rev Alexander Bryce in 1750, who after a long search found the damaged jug in the attic of a Mr Urquhart, a coppersmith in Stirling, and restored the standard.

Bakers used the measure until the late 19th century.

- One joug was sixteen Scottish gills (of approximately 106 mL each)
- One joug was four mutchkins (of approximately 424 mL each)
- One joug was two chopins (of approximately 848 mL each)
- Eight jougs made a Scottish gallon (approximately 13.568 L)

== See also ==
- Obsolete Scottish units of measurement
