= Fall (unit) =

Scottish measurement of length

A fall or fa’ is a Scottish measurement of length. Other variants of the name include "faw", "faa" and "fa"; the spelling with an apologetic apostrophe is not favoured now. The measurement was mostly out of use by the 19th century, and English measurements were imposed in 1824 by an act of parliament.

There were 320 falls in a Scots mile.

Equivalent to:

- Scottish measures: 18 ft, or 6 ells
- Metric system: 5.6479 metres
- Imperial system: 6.1766 yards, 1.123 rods

== See also ==
- Ell (Scots)
- Scottish inch
- Scots mile
