= Firlot =

Old Scottish unit of volume

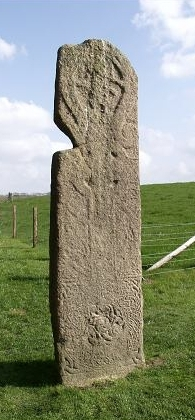
The Maiden Stone. Tradition tells of a Drumdurno maiden who bet a stranger she could bake a "firlot" (an old Scottish measure) of meal before he could forge a path to the top of Bennachie, a nearby mountain. As usual, the 'stranger' was the Devil in disguise, who, having completed the path in time, returned to chase after the fleeing maiden. As he caught her, she was turned to stone; the triangular chunk missing from the side of the stone supposedly marks where he reached out and grabbed her shoulder.

The firlot was a dry measure used in Scotland. For centuries it was the primary measure for all grains sold in the country. In the Scottish system a firlot was equal to 4 pecks, and the boll was equal to 4 firlots.

The first attempt of the Parliament of Scotland to define the firlot was in 1426. They set it as 1,200 Scottish cubic inches or 19.98 litres, but effectively the exact volume continued to be defined by local custom and varied across the country.

Over the years the common definition seems to have increased. By an act of the Parliament of Scotland of 1617, the commissioners' firlot of Linlithgow was made the standard for the whole of Scotland, but, in fact, two units were defined for different commodities. The first, which “contained 21 pints and a mutchkin of the water of Leith,” (approximately 35 litres) was for wheat, pease, beans, rye, and white salt, commodities which had been sold by striken, or level measure. The second firlot, which contained 31 pints of water, about 50 litres, was for oats, barley and malt, which had been sold by heaped measure. The pint mentioned is the Scottish Sterling jug.

The measure became less common in 1696 when laws were passed requiring all oatmeal to be sold by weight rather than measure. It finally disappeared with the introduction of Imperial units by the Weights and Measures Act 1824 (5 Geo. 4. c. 74).

== See also ==
- Obsolete Scottish units of measurement
