= Richard Benese =

English Augustinian canon (died 1546)

Richard Benese (died 1546), was a canon of the Augustinian priory of Merton.

== Career ==
Benese supplicated for the degree of B.C.L. at Oxford University 6 July 1519. He signed the surrender of the Augustinian priory of Merton to Henry VIII on 16 April 1538.

He had previously written a book upon the art and science of surveying land. The book was prepared for the press by Thomas Paynell, also a canon of Merton, and was printed by James Nicholson at Southwark. Its probable date is 1537. This first edition is more complete than a later one, which omits the tables for the calculation of dimensions.

== Later life ==
The name Benese occurs as the holder of the following benefices and dignities, but whether this represents two or more different persons is uncertain. Evidence linking them is circumstantial.

1. Clerk in the diocese of Hereford, 1514
2. Parson of Woodborough, Sarum diocese 1511 to 1515
3. Precentor of Hereford, 11 Nov. 1538 to end of 1546
4. Prebendary of Farrendon, Line., 20 April 1542
5. Parson of Longlednam, Lincolnshire
6. Rector of Long Ditton, Surrey, 11 Feb. 1542
7. Rector of All Hallows, Honey Lane, 11 Oct. 1540.

The church of Long Ditton was in the patronage of Merton Priory, and that the next rector of All Hallows was Thomas Paynell, the editor of Benese's book, suggesting that these two benefices were held by the same person. The precentor of Hereford also died at the end of 1546, about the same time as the rector of Long Ditton. But the will of the rector of Long Ditton (Alen. 31, 47), dated 3 Nov. 1546, and proved 20 Oct. 1547, says nothing of the testator's holding other benefices. A brother, Edward, and a sister, Elizabeth, married to Ric. Skynner, are mentioned in the will.

== Publications ==
- 'This boke sheweth the maner of measurynge of all maner of lande, as well of woodlande, as of lande in the felde, newly invented and compyled by Syr Rycharde Benese, chanon of Marton Abbay besyde [L]ondon.' (1547)
