= Pertica (unit) =

Ancient Roman unit of length and area

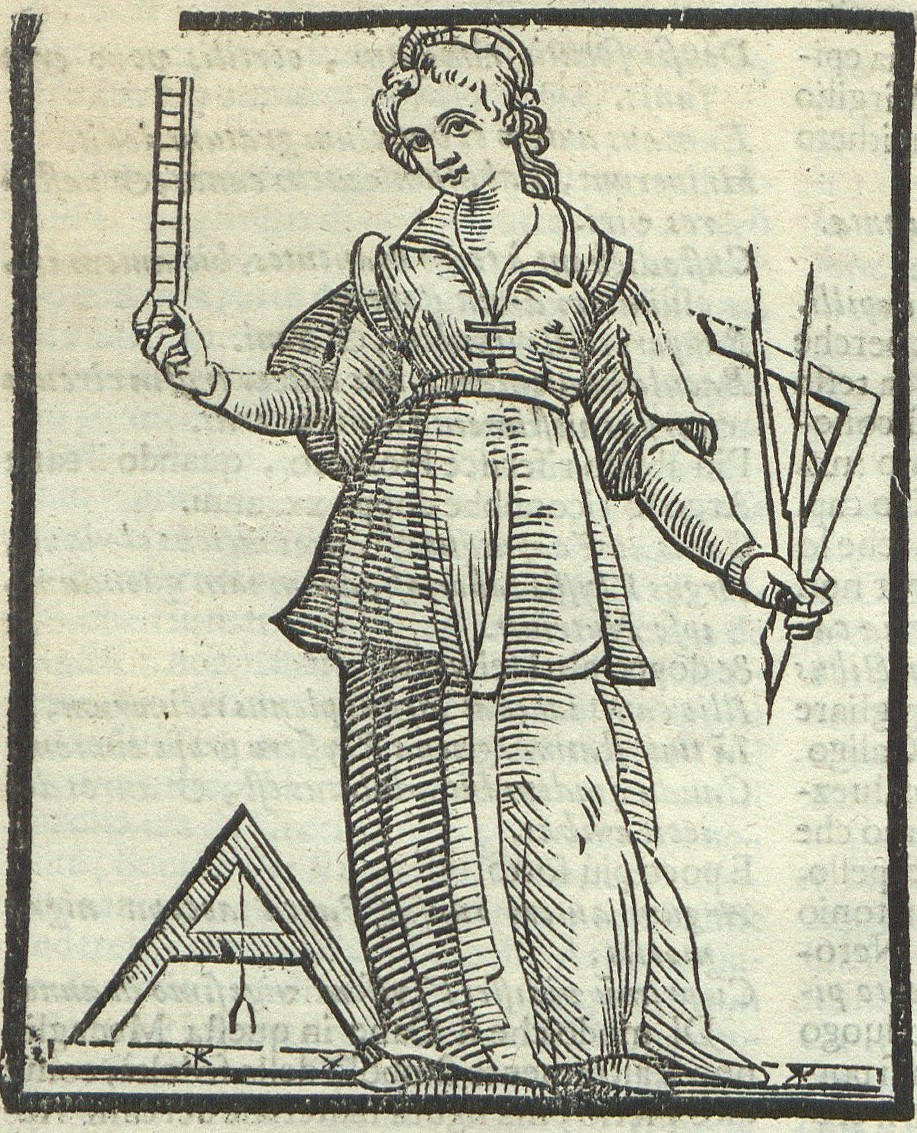
Allegory of measurement, the decempeda is under the woman's feet with Xs marking the feet subdivisions (by Giovanni Zaratino Castellini, 17th century)

The pertica (from Latin: pertica, measuring rod) was a pre-metric unit of either length or area, with the values varying by location. For a similar unit in Northern Europe, see perch.

== Ancient Rome ==
In the Ancient Rome, pertica, also called decempeda, was a unit of length, usually equal to 10 Roman feet (pedes), or approximately 2.96 meters. The variants of pertica contained 12 and 15 pedes. Isidore of Seville (per Codex Gudianus) states that sometimes a pertica of 10, 12, 15, or 17 pedes was used by agrimensores (Roman land surveyors) to accommodate the richness of the soil and approximately even the yield per unit area. Kidson highlights the near-perfect match between the pertica of 17 pedes and the English version of the perch.

The same names, pertica and decempeda, were used for the surveyor's tool, a rod of the corresponding length with subdivision into smaller units, similar to the Ancient Greek kalamos.

== Italy ==
The linear unit in Italy was about 3 meters, area unit contained about 600 square meters. After switching to the metric system, the unit became equal to 1 decare.

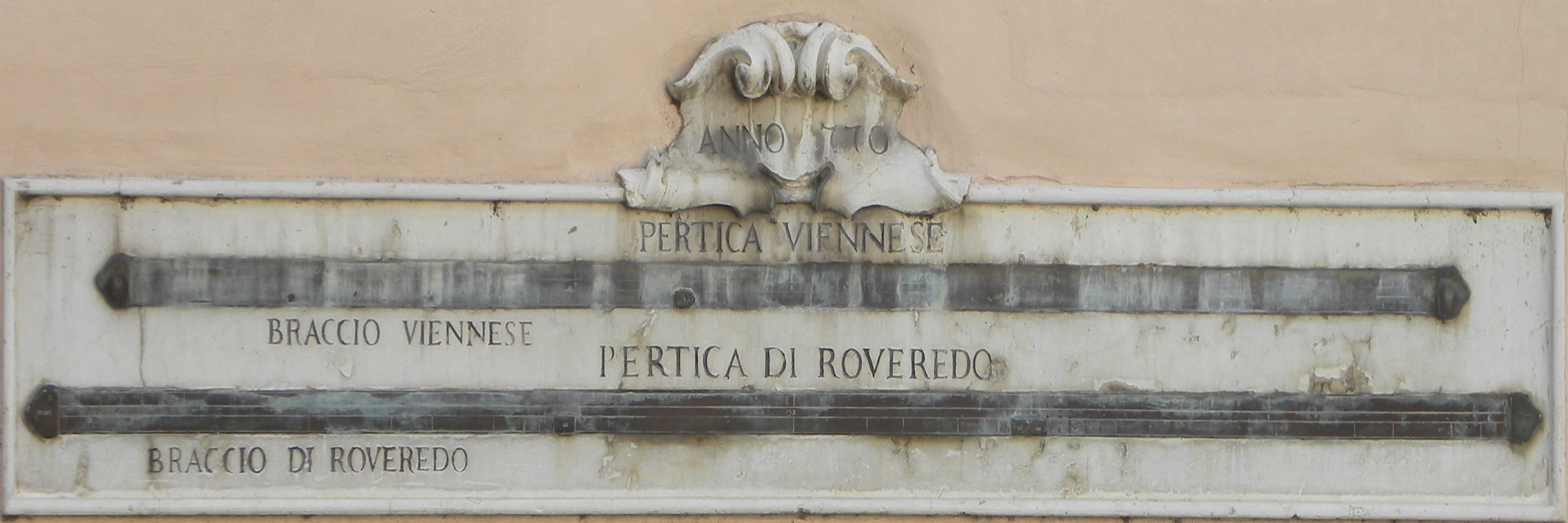
Viennese pertica is on top, Rovereto pertica at the bottom (Palazzo Pretorio, Rovereto)

The regional area values significantly varied per province (in square meters):

- Bergamo 662;
- Como (milanese) 655;
- Cremona 808;
- Pavia 770;
- Piacenza 762;
- Sondrio 688.

== Sources ==
- Morwood, James, ed. (2005). The pocket Oxford Latin dictionary: Latin - English. Oxford University Press. ISBN 978-0-19-173958-3.
- Walthew, C. V. (1981). "Possible Standard Units of Measurement in Roman Military Planning". Britannia. 12: 15–35. doi:10.2307/526241. JSTOR 526241.
- Kidson, Peter (1990-01-01). "A Metrological Investigation". Journal of the Warburg and Courtauld Institutes. 53 (1): 71–97. doi:10.2307/751340. ISSN 0075-4390. JSTOR 751340.
- Duncan-Jones, R. P. (1980). "Length-Units in Roman Town Planning: The Pes Monetalis and the Pes Drusianus". Britannia. 11: 127–133. doi:10.2307/525675. JSTOR 525675.
- Senseney, John R. (2013-10-28). "Plans, Measurement Systems, and Surveying: The Roman Technology of Pre-Building". A Companion to Roman Architecture. Wiley. pp. 140–156. doi:10.1002/9781118325117.ch8. ISBN 978-1-4051-9964-3.
