= Peck =

Unit of volume with different values

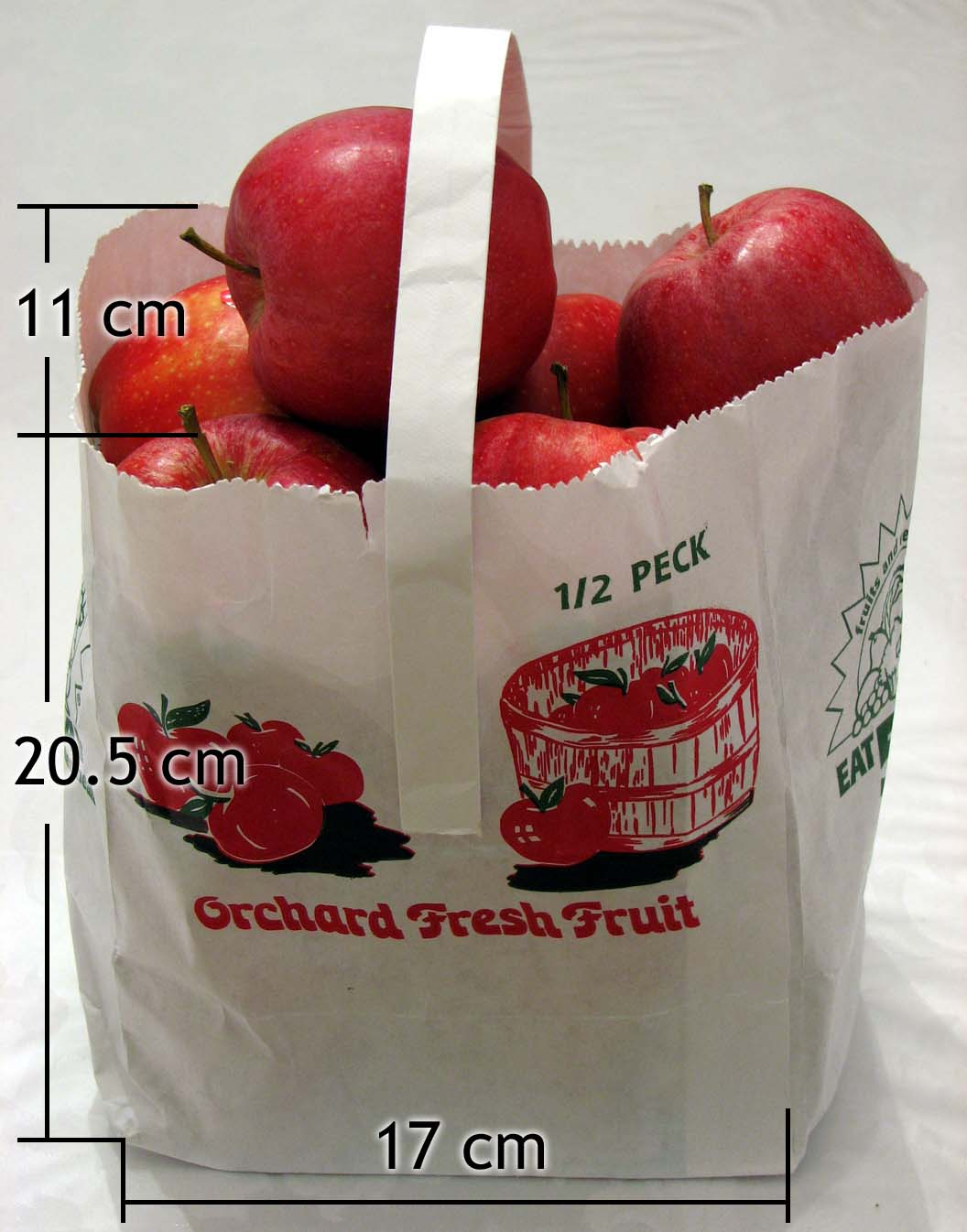
A half-peck apple bag

A peck is an imperial and United States customary unit of dry volume, equivalent to 8 dry quarts or 16 dry pints. An imperial peck is equivalent to 9.09218 liters and a US customary peck is equivalent to 8.80976754172 liters. Four pecks make a bushel. Although the peck is no longer widely used, some produce, such as apples, are still often sold by the peck in the U.S. (although it is obsolete in the UK, found only in the old nursery rhyme "Peter Piper" and in the Bible – e.g., Matthew 5:15 in some older translations).

== Scotland before 1824 ==
In Scotland, the peck was used as a dry measure until the introduction of imperial units as a result of the Weights and Measures Act 1824. The peck was equal to about 9 litres (1.98 Imp gal) (in the case of certain crops, such as wheat, peas, beans and meal) and about 13 litres (2.86 Imp gal) (in the case of barley, oats and malt). A firlot was equal to 4 pecks.

== Conversions ==
| 1 imperial peck | ≡ | 1/4 of an imperial bushel |
| 1 imperial peck | ≡ | 2 imperial gallons |
| 1 imperial peck | ≡ | 8 imperial quarts |
| 1 imperial peck | ≡ | 16 imperial pints |
| 1 imperial peck | ≡ | 320 imperial fluid ounces |
| 1 imperial peck | ≡ | 9.09218 litres |
| 1 imperial peck | ≈ | 554.8389 cubic inches |
| 1 imperial peck | ≈ | 2.4019 US gallons |
| 1 imperial peck | ≈ | 9.6076 US quarts |
| 1 imperial peck | ≈ | 19.2152 US pints |
| 1 imperial peck | ≈ | 8.2564539 US dry quarts |
| 1 imperial peck | ≈ | 16.5129079 US dry pints |

| 1 US peck | ≡ | 1/4 of a US bushel |
| 1 US peck | ≡ | 8 US dry quarts |
| 1 US peck | ≡ | 16 US dry pints |
| 1 US peck | ≡ | 537.605 cubic inches |
| 1 US peck | ≡ | 8.80976754172 litres |
| 1 US peck | ≡ | 2 15121/46200 US gallons |
| 1 US peck | ≡ | 9 3571/11550 US liquid quarts |
| 1 US peck | ≡ | 18 3571/5775 US liquid pints |
| 1 US peck | ≈ | 1.937878 imperial gallons |
| 1 US peck | ≈ | 7.7515118 imperial quarts |
| 1 US peck | ≈ | 15.5030236 imperial pints |
| 1 US peck | ≈ | 310.060471 imperial fluid ounces |

== See also ==
- Bushel
- Obsolete Scottish units of measurement
- Winchester measure
