= Mutchkin =

Scottish unit of liquid volume

Disambiguation: a "mutchkin" can also refer a close-fitting Scottish cap.

The mutchkin (Scottish Gaelic: mùisgein) was a Scottish unit of liquid volume measurement that was in use from at least 1661 (and possibly as early as the 15th century) until the late 19th century, approximately equivalent to 424 mL, or roughly 3/4 imperial pint. The word was derived from mutse – a mid 15th-century Dutch measure of beer or wine.

- A mutchkin could be subdivided into four Scottish gills (of approximately 106 mL each) – this was roughly equivalent to three imperial gills.
- Two mutchkins (848 mL) made one chopin.
- Four mutchkins (1696 mL) made one Scottish pint (or joug), roughly equivalent to three imperial pints (1705 mL).

== See also ==
- Obsolete Scottish units of measurement
