= Penny Scots =

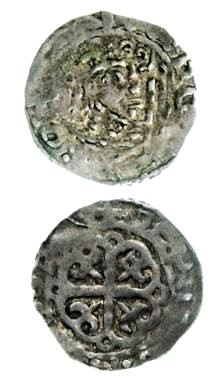
Picture of a silver penny of King David I of Scotland. Represents the first "native" Scottish coinage, as in the first silver coinage to have a Scottish king's head on it.

The Penny Scots was a unit of the Pound Scots, the currency of Scotland until the Acts of Union 1707. The word "penny" (Scottish Gaelic: peighinn, but see below) was used in Scottish parlance for money generally; for example, a "penny-fee" was an expression for wages, a "penny-maister" would be a town treasurer, and a "penny-wedding" was one where every guest contributed to pay for the event. Meanwhile, "penny-wheep" was particularly poor beer.

My riches a's my penny-fee,
And I maun guide it canny, O.
— Burns, My Nannie, O

The older Scottish Gaelic word for penny was peighinn. The modern form is sgillinn, literally shilling, which reflects the fact that at the Union with England in 1707, the exchange rate was fixed at twelve Pounds Scots to one Pound Sterling so one shilling Scots exchanged for one English penny.

== See also ==
- Scottish coinage – Coinage of Scotland before 1707
- Pennyland – Scottish land measurement
- Bawbee – Scottish coin, a sixpence
- Bodle – Scottish coin
- Plack – Scottish coin
