= Half-pistole (Scottish coin) =

1701 Scottish gold coin

A Half-pistole was a Scottish gold coin minted in 1701 under the reign of King William III. Along with the Pistole it was one of last gold coin minted for the Kingdom of Scotland before the Acts of Union 1707. The Half-pistole was equal to 6 Scottish pounds with an approximate value equal to the British Half guinea.
