= Scottish coinage =

Coinage of Scotland before 1707

From c. 1124 until 1709, the coinage of Scotland was unique and minted locally. A wide variety of coins, such as the plack, bodle, bawbee, dollar and ryal were produced over that time. Before c. 1124, coins of Northumbria and various other places had been used for trading purposes. From 1709, coins of the Kingdom of Great Britain and then of the UK have been used.

== Ancient history and Roman trade (c. AD 71–400) ==
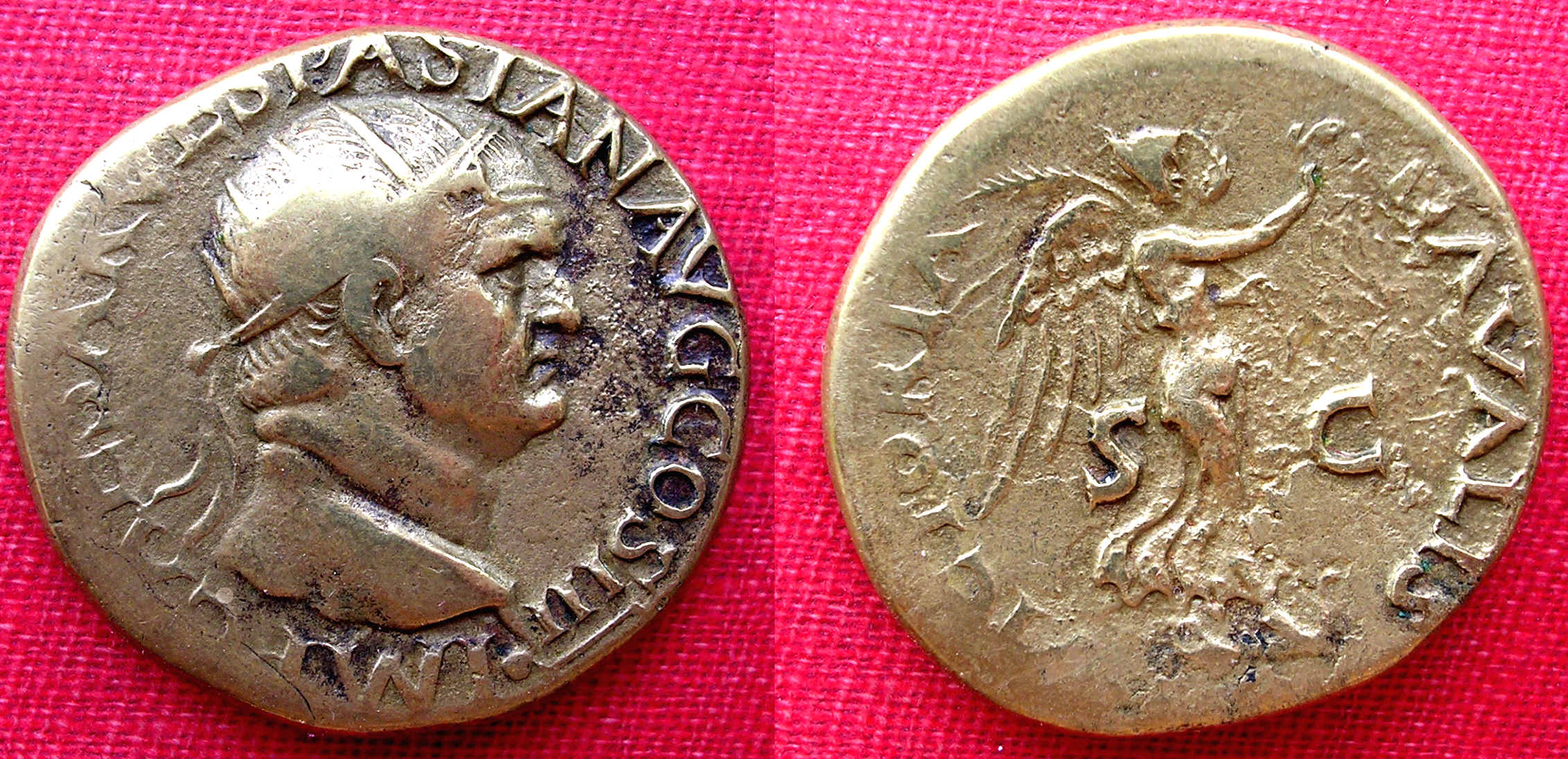
An example of a dupondius coin of Vespasian (AD 69–79) typical of the Roman coins deposited at the Cardean Fort Angus in the late first century.

The earliest coins in Scotland were introduced by the Roman provinces of Britain that were obtained from trade with the westernmost outpost of the Roman Empire. Far from being isolated, the Celts of Caledonia, north of Hadrian's Wall, developed trade to the general benefit of the population, to the north of the Wall. Roman coins appear over a wide range across the country, especially sites near the Antonine Wall. Hadrian's Wall was also regarded as a means to regulate social traffic and trade north, rather than a military defence against the northern tribes of the Caledoni. Civil settlements arose along south of the wall with shops and taverns that facilitated trade between the Empire and the north. It is possible to recognise groupings of coins from certain periods, during the Flavian and Antonine occupations; such as Cardean Fort Angus where Roman dupondius coins AD 69–79 date to the reign of Emperor Vespasian. Other sites include coins from North Uist dating to the 4th century until recently was thought to be beyond the sphere of known trade routes. Other native sites include the Fairy Knowe broch Buchlyvie, and the broch and dun at Gargunnock in Stirlingshire. Some sites include substantial silver treasure hoards most likely buried or abandoned in either Roman or native pots. Indicating the Roman governor of Britain paid large sums of money to the inhabitants of southern Scotland and possibly bribing the northern Caledonians to maintain peaceful relations with Romans and the British. Payments to chieftains are recorded in four areas; Edinburgh, Fife, Aberdeen and the Moray Firth. This may indicate such discoveries (e.g. the Birnie hoard of between 200 and 400 silver coins) were deposited as votive offerings. Examples including coinage of Constantine II (337–342) with over 20 such hoards found throughout Scotland. Rare examples include a base silver (potin) coin of Ptolemy XIII of Egypt, 80–51 BC In 410, trade ceased as the Roman Empire withdrew from the island of Albion.

== Early medieval period (500–900) ==
As the Roman Empire retreated from Britain, various kingdoms sprouted up to the south of Scotland. One of these, Northumbria, soon expanded into the north as far as the Kingdom of Strathclyde. Thus, it controlled the southern parts of what is now Scotland, and the bronze sceat coins of the Northumbrian Kings circulated freely in what is now Scotland. This coin was issued from 837 to 854. Anglo-Saxon coins were minted in Northumberland; however, due to the extensive trade routes of the Vikings, sceat coins were also minted in Frisia and Jutland during Anglo-Saxon times and coins of this period indicate the extent of Scottish trade not only with Northumberland but also with continental Europe. Norsemen also introduced some form of coinage, and coins from as far away as Byzantium and the Arabic countries have been found in sites in Scandinavia, including Norway which had strong links with Scotland in the early Middle Ages.

== Scottish Penny (c. 1100–1602) ==
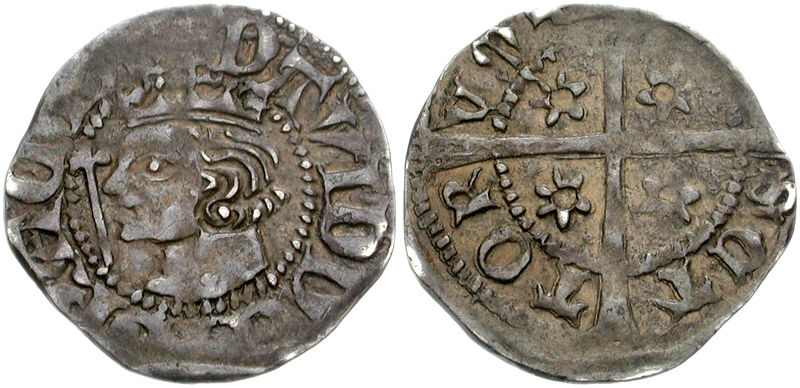
David II (r. 1329–1371): penny
+DAVID DEI GRACIA, crowned head left; sceptre before	[REX] SCT TOR VM+, long cross; mullets in quarters.
18 mm; 1.31 g; c. 1351–1357.

The first king of Scots to produce his own coinage was David I (r. 1124–1153). In 1136 he captured Carlisle, including its English mint and nearby silver mines from Stephen, King of England. He struck silver pennies, which were similar to those Stephen struck for England, at Carlisle, Edinburgh, St Andrews, Roxburgh and Berwick. For the next two centuries, the continued use of a profile, as opposed to the facing portrait, was about all that distinguished Scottish coins from their English counterparts. In particular, the reverse types of Scottish coins followed the English Tealby, short cross, and long cross designs. Moreover, Scottish coins followed English weight standards, allowing the two coinages to circulate alongside one another.

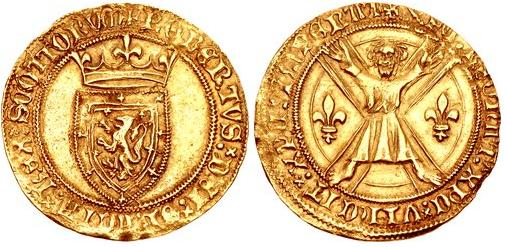
Robert III (r. 1390–1406): gold lion
Royal Arms	Saint Andrew

David II of Scotland ended the parity between Scottish and English coins, resulting in an English proclamation banning the lower quality Scottish coins from their country in 1356. Robert III of Scotland continued to devalue Scottish coins, making them worth one-half of their English counterparts by 1392. He also replaced the profile bust on the obverse of Scottish coins with a facing head, which made his coins much easier to confuse with the more valuable English issues. David II's attempt to introduce gold coins to Scotland by copying the English noble was a failure but Robert III successfully introduced the gold lion, which showed St. Andrew crucified on his saltire-shaped cross.

Under James III of Scotland English influence of Scottish coinage gave way to Burgundian models, with both his gold rider and silver plack. He is best remembered, however, for the realistic portraits on his silver groat. James III also introduced the gold unicorn. This was one of a long series of coin types which characterized continuing changes in standard and revaluations of Scottish coinage. Ordinances required Scots to turn in their old coins in exchange for new issues struck to a lower standard, thereby providing a profit to the king. James VI alone had eight issues of coins before he unified the thrones, and to a large extent the coinages, of Scotland and England.

At the end of the 16th century King James VI called in all silver coins, totally 211 stone and 10 pounds, and these were melted down to create new coins with his image, hugely reducing the surviving coins predating this point. At this point copper pennies were first minted, valued at one twelfth of a silver penny.

== Union of the Crowns (from 1603) ==
In 1604, the year after the Union of the Crowns, the Council ordered Scotland to use the same coinage standards as England. A new gold coin, called a Unit in Scotland or Unite in England, was valued at £12 Scots or £1 sterling. Gold and fine silver coins now had the same sizes and compositions in Scotland and England, but Scotland did maintain its own copper coinage. The Scottish and English coinages both used the same royal title, king of Great Britain, France and Ireland, and when they specified a denomination it was a Roman numeral which could be interpreted as Scottish shillings or English pence. The designs in the two kingdoms had only minor differences. In the North, coins used the Crown of Scotland, decorated by a fleur-de-lis in the center between two crosses, as opposed the English crown, where the placements of the lis and crosses were reversed. Beginning in 1610, Scottish coins also used the Royal coat of arms of Scotland, which placed the Scottish lion in the more prominent positions than the English version.

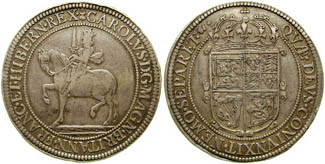
Charles I (r. 1625–1649) silver 60 shillings
Charles I with title MAGN BRITANN FRANC ET HIBERN REX	Royal arms of Scotland and Scottish Crown
Briot's 1637 milled coinage

In 1636, Charles I made Nicholas Briot master of the Scottish Mint at Edinburgh. With his Scottish son-in-law, Sir John Falconer, Briot replaced Scotland's gold and silver hammered coinage with machine made milled coinage. The English Civil war ended this coinage in 1642. During the war, Scotland struck a few copper coins but after the war the Edinburgh mint closed and Scotland used the regular coins of the Commonwealth of England.

Although the Parliament of Scotland proclaimed Charles II King on 5 February 1649, he did not strike coins in Scotland until 1664. His silver denominations were multiples of the merk. At this time, the Scottish one merk coin was similar to an English shilling, but it was valued at 13s 4d Scots. In 1677, Charles II introduced a copper bawbee, valued at 6 pence Scots, with a crowned thistle on the reverse in place of the figure of Britannia on the copper coins he struck in England. James VII of Scotland reverted to silver coins with denominations in shillings, now with the weights adjusted to reflect an exchange rate of 13 shillings Scots to 1 shilling sterling.

=== 1707–1710 recoinage ===
Following the 1707 union between the Kingdom of Scotland and the Kingdom of England, the Scottish silver (but not gold nor copper) coinage was replaced with new silver coins, with the aim of creating a common currency for the new Kingdom of Great Britain as required by the Treaty of Union. The exercise was conducted under the guidance of Sir Isaac Newton, who had previously directed the recoinage in England some years earlier in his role as Warden of the Mint (and subsequently as Master of the Mint).

Despite fluctuations in the exchange rate since 1603, and a 1697 proclamation setting the ratio at 13:1, a 12:1 ratio (one shilling Scots to one penny sterling) was applied to the recoinage, although compensation was paid. The new coinage was made using Troy weights (12 Troy ounces to the pound), rather than the traditional Scots weights (16 Troy ounces to the pound). Coins were minted in both London and Edinburgh, the latter inscribed with the letter 'E' under the bust of the monarch to permit them to be distinguished. Under the supervision of moneyers from the Tower Mint in London, a weight of 103,346 Troy pounds in crowns, half-crowns, shillings, and sixpences were minted at the Edinburgh Mint with a value of £320,372 12s, equivalent to US$20.5 million (£17.1 million) at 2017 average silver prices and exchange rates.

This 12:1 ratio is reflected in the fact that sgillinn, which originally meant shilling, became the Scottish Gaelic word for a penny sterling, and bonn-a-sia which literally means "coin of six" became the word for a halfpenny. Following decimalisation in 1971, sgillinn became and remains the Scottish Gaelic word for a new penny.

As a result of the recoinage, foreign coins, which were frequently used alongside the local currency, stopped being legal tender on 6 October 1707. Pre-Union 40-, 20- and 10-shilling coins ceased to be legal tender on 10 February 1708, but were temporarily put back into circulation before finally ceasing to be legal tender on June 1, along with coins of 1/2, 1, 2, and 4 merks, 5 shillings, and the 3s 6d coin.

The last batch of new coins, consisting of silver shillings and half-crowns were delivered on 5 October 1709, and were to be the last coins to be minted in Scotland.

=== Subsequent developments ===
Article 16 of the Treaty of Union stipulated that Scotland was to keep its own mint.

"That, from and after the Union, the coin shall be of the same standard and value throughout the United Kingdom as now in England, and a Mint shell be continued in Scotland under the same rules as the Mint in England; and the present officers of the Mint continued subject to such regulations and alterations as Her Majestie, her heirs or successors, or the Parliament of Great Britain shall think fit."

— Article XVI of the Acts of Union

Although the Edinburgh Mint retained its permanent officials (though not other staff) for a further hundred years, until 1814, minting ceased a mere two years after Union, despite several subsequent proposals to restart production. The mint itself was finally abolished in 1817 and sold in 1830. Abolition caused a low level of protest, mentioned by Sir Walter Scott, and continued to be protested against by Nationalist pamphlets into the 1950s and beyond. The title of 'Governor of the Mint of Scotland', which passed to the Chancellor of the Exchequer under the Coinage Act 1870, was finally abolished with the passing of the Coinage Act 1971.

The transition from Scottish coinage to English did not occur overnight. Scottish coinage was still in circulation in the later 18th century, but the changeover was made a little easier due to common currency in the nomenclature. Pound Sterling is still translated as Punnd Sasannach (English pound) in Scottish Gaelic Certain old coin names, such as bawbee, continued in colloquial usage into the 20th century. Others, such as mark and dollar, would be more associated with various foreign currencies by contemporary Scots.

Some British coins later had explicitly Scottish reverses: for example the shilling appeared with either English or Scottish royal arms as reverses from 1937 to 1970, while its replacement the 5p coin had a crowned thistle from 1971 to 2008.

Currently, three Scottish banks produce their own banknotes (Bank of Scotland, Royal Bank of Scotland and Clydesdale Bank), but no coinage. Scotland is the only part of the UK where one pound notes are still in usage (although they can be found in the Isle of Man and Channel Islands).

== List of Scottish coins ==
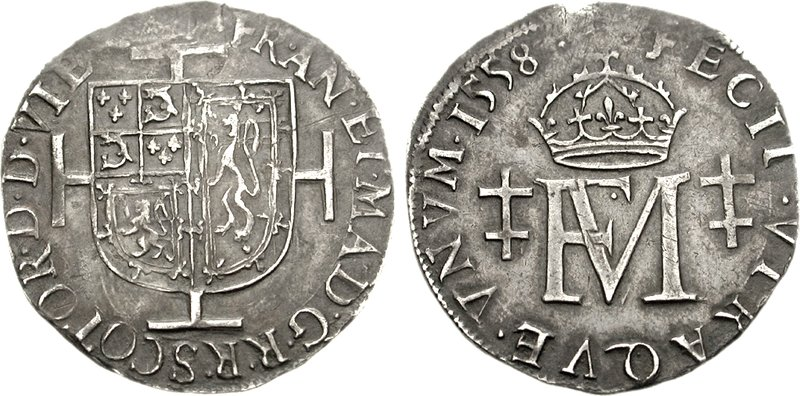
Mary I (r. 1542–1567) and Francis (r. 1558–1560): testoon
FR•AN • ET • MA • D • G • R • R • SCOTORVM • D • D • VIE[N], crowned arms of Francis and Mary over cross potent	• FECIT • VTRAQVE • VNVM • 1558 •, crowned FM; Lorraine cross to either side.

As with Scottish weights and measures, many of the Scottish denominations bore the same names as those in England, but were of slightly different values. The dates, and first kings to issue them are included:

- Pistole – Gold, 12 pounds Scots
- Dollar – Replacement for the ryal, 60 Scots shillings (James VI)
- Ryal – Gold, 1565
- Crown or Lion – Gold (James I)
- Half-crown, Demi-Lion or Demys – Gold (James I)
- Ducat or "bonnet" – 40 shillings, 1539 (James V)
- Mark or merk – Gold (giving rise to the term markland)
- Noble – Gold, worth half a mark, 1357 (David II, reintroduced by Robert III)
- Unicorn – Gold, 18 shillings Scots, 1484–85 (James III)
- Half-unicorn – Gold, 9 shillings Scots (James IV)
- Testoun – silver, 1553. Was produced in France with the new process of mill and screw, being the first milled coinage of Scotland.
- Bawbee – Billon, six pence from 1537
- Shilling
- Groat – Silver, equivalent to four pence, from 1357 (giving rise to the term groatland)
- Half-groat – Silver, equivalent to two pence, from 1357
- Turner – Billon, two pence (James VI), later copper.
- Bodle – Copper, two pence (Charles II)
- Hardhead – also called Lion, billon coin circulated in the reigns of Mary and James VI
- Penny – Billon, one of the earliest coins, dating from David I. Later made of copper; giving rise to the term pennyland.
- Halfpennies – Initially literally half of a penny, these became minted coins in their own right in c.1280. Later made of copper.
- Farthing or quarter-penny – These were originally quarters of pennies, but as with Halfpennies, became coins in their own right in c.1280. Later made of copper.
- Plack

== Scottish monarchs who issued coins ==
- David I (1124–1153)
- Malcolm IV (1153–1165)
- William I the Lion (1165–1214)
- Alexander II (1214–1249)
- Alexander III (1249–1286)
- John Balliol (1292–1296)
- Robert I the Bruce (1306–1329)
- David II (1329–1371)
- Robert II (1371–1390)
- Robert III (1390–1406)
- James I (1406–1437)
- James II (1437–1460)
- James III (1460–1488)
- James IV (1488–1513)
- James V (1513–1542)
- Mary I (1542–1567)
- James VI (1567–1625)
- Charles I (1625–1649)
- Charles II (1660–1685)
- James VII (1685–1688)
- William II and Mary II (1689–1694)
- William II (1694–1701)
- Anne (1701–1714, no coins minted after Union)

== See also ==
- Pound Scots
- Modern Scottish banknotes

== References and further reading ==
- Donald Bateson. Scottish Coins. Shire Book, Bucks, 1987, ISBN 0-85263-847-7
- Jean Belaubre. Dictionnaire de numismatique médiévale occidentale. Paris, Léopard d'Or, 1996. ISBN 2-86377-121-3
- Holmes, Nicholas, Scottish Coins, NMS Publishing, Edinburgh (1998), ISBN 1-901663-02-7
- Mackay – Mussel (eds.): Coin Price Guide to British coins 1066- Token Publishing Ltd, Axminster, Devon
- Ian Halley Stewart. The Scottish Coinage, Spink & Son, London, 1955
- "Coinage" – in Collins Encyclopedia of Scotland (ed. Keay & Keay, 1994)
