= Bodle =

Scottish coin

A bodle or boddle or bodwell, also known as a half groat or Turner, was a Scottish copper coin, of less value than a bawbee, worth about one-sixth of an English penny. They were first issued under Charles I, and were minted until the coronation of Anne. Its name may derive from Bothwell (a mint-master).

It is mentioned in one of the songs of Joanna Baillie:

Black Madge, she is prudent, has sense in her noddle
Is douce and respectit; I carena a bodle.

The use of the word survives in the anglicised phrase "not to care a bodle", which Brewer glosses as "not to care a farthing". Something similar appears in Burns' Tam o' Shanter (line 110), it is also mentioned:

Fair play, he car'd na deils a boddle (He cared not devils a bodle)

== Gallery ==
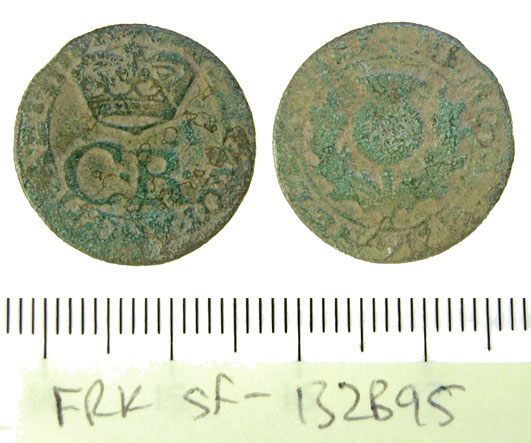
Turner or Bodle of Charles I, c.1642-1650 AD

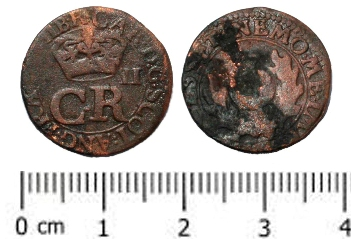
Turner or Bodle of Charles II, c. 1663-1668 AD

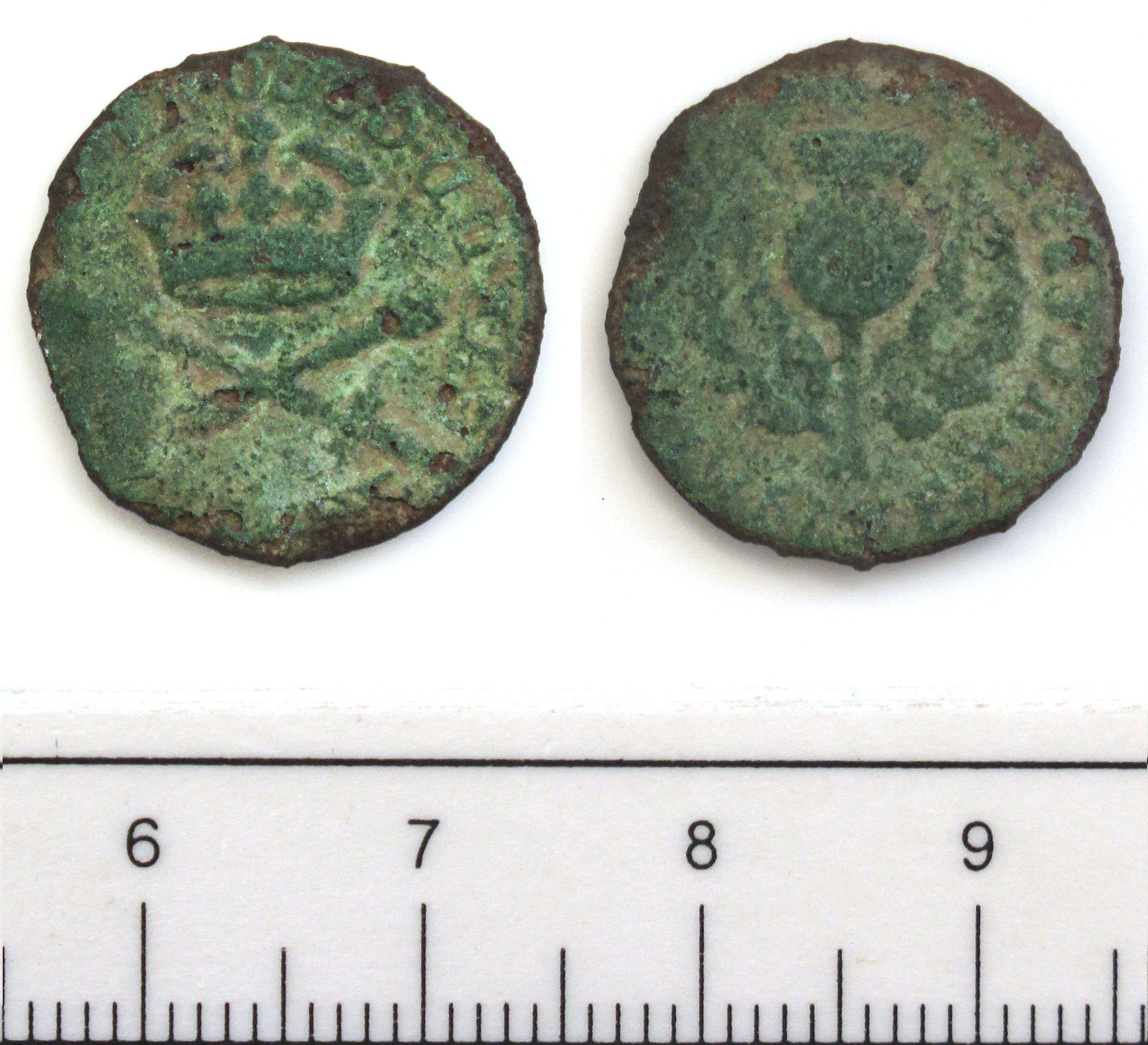
Turner or Bodle of Charles II, c. 1677-1679 AD

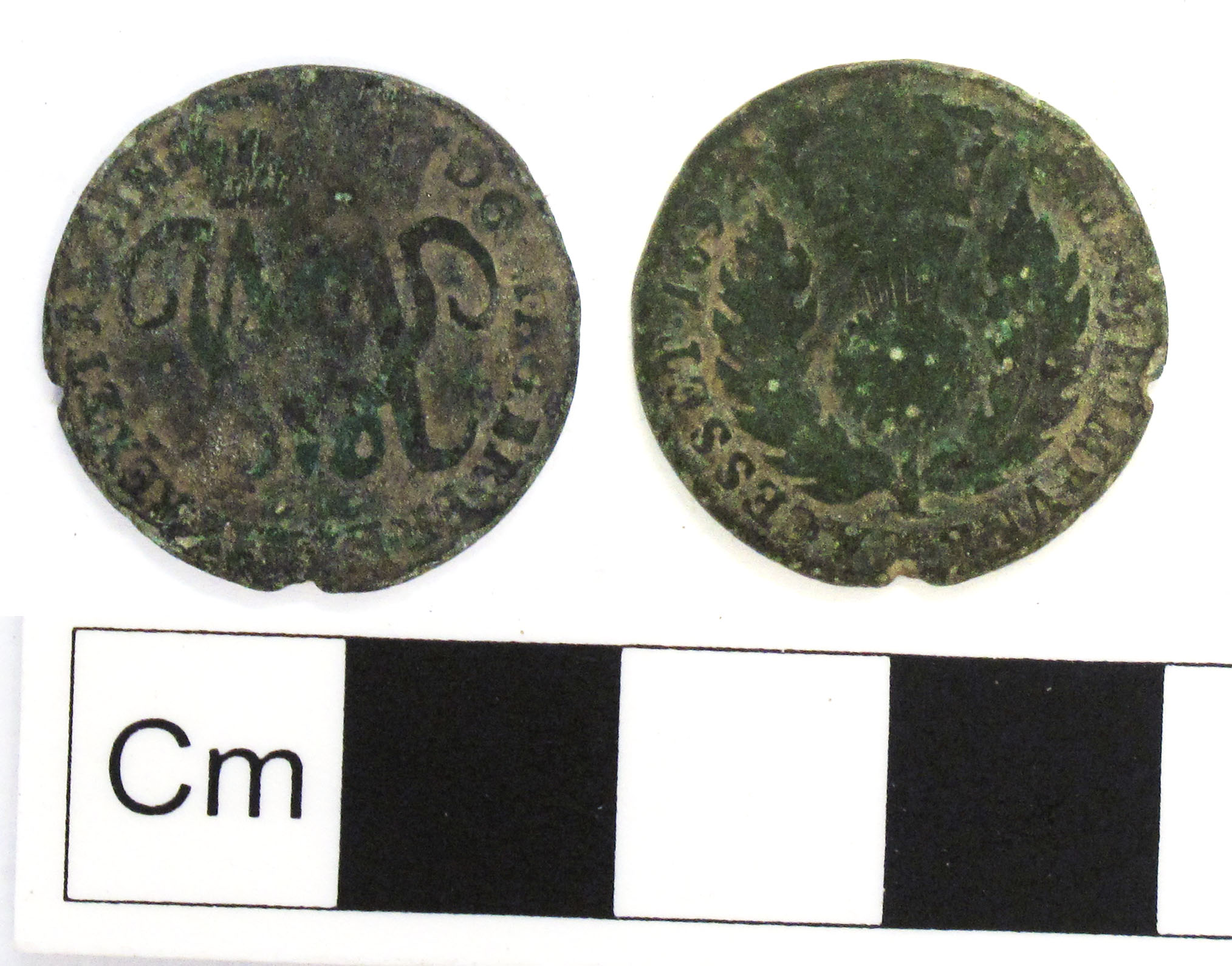
Bodle or Turner of William and Mary, 1692

== See also ==
- Plack
- Pound Scots
- Scottish coinage
