= History of the English penny (1603–1707) =

The history of the English penny from 1603 to 1707 covers the period of the House of Stuart, up to the Acts of Union of 1707 which brought about the Union of the Kingdom of England with the Kingdom of Scotland.

== The Stuarts and the Commonwealth (1603–1714) ==
=== The Early Stuarts ===
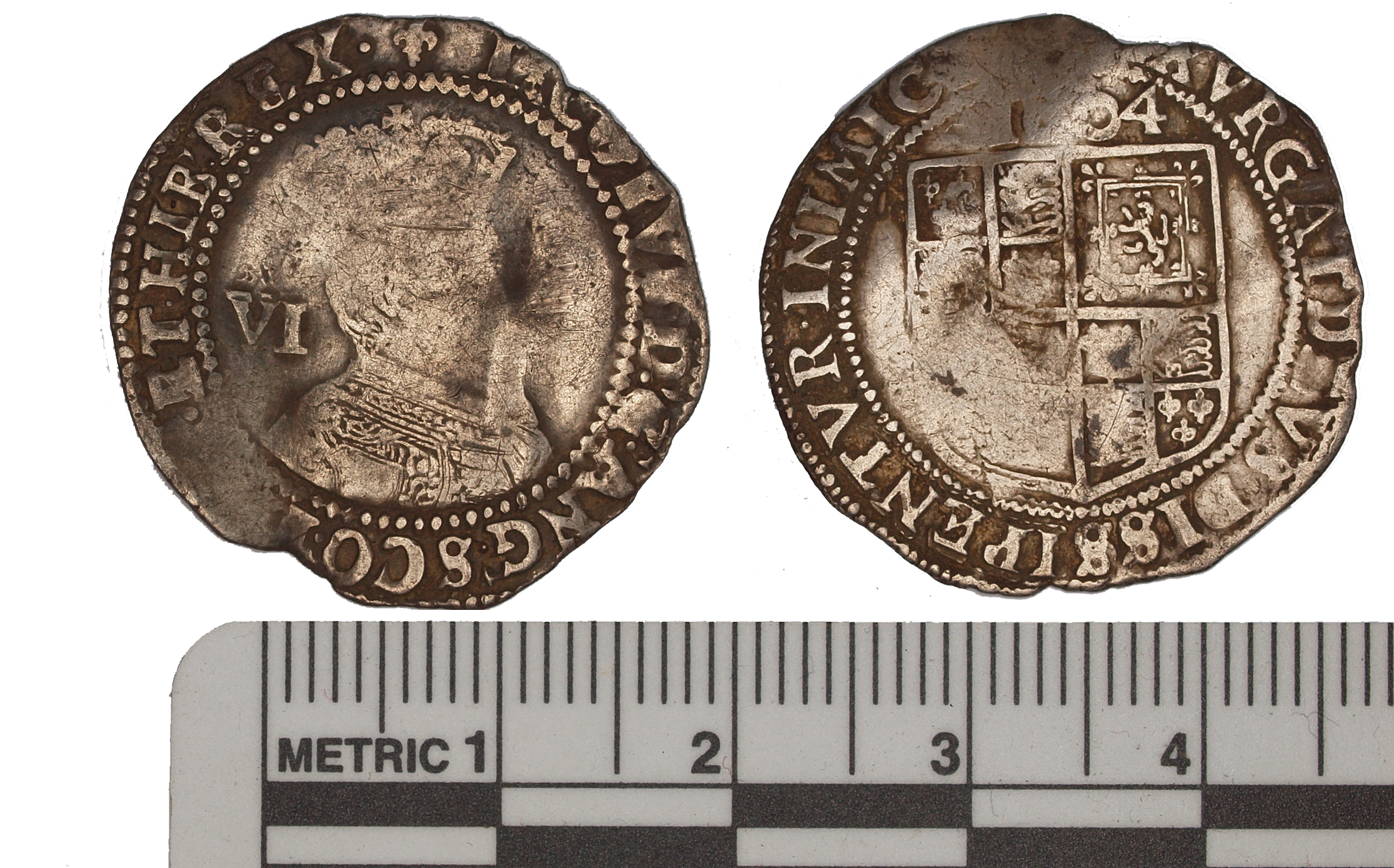
1604 penny of James I with portrait.

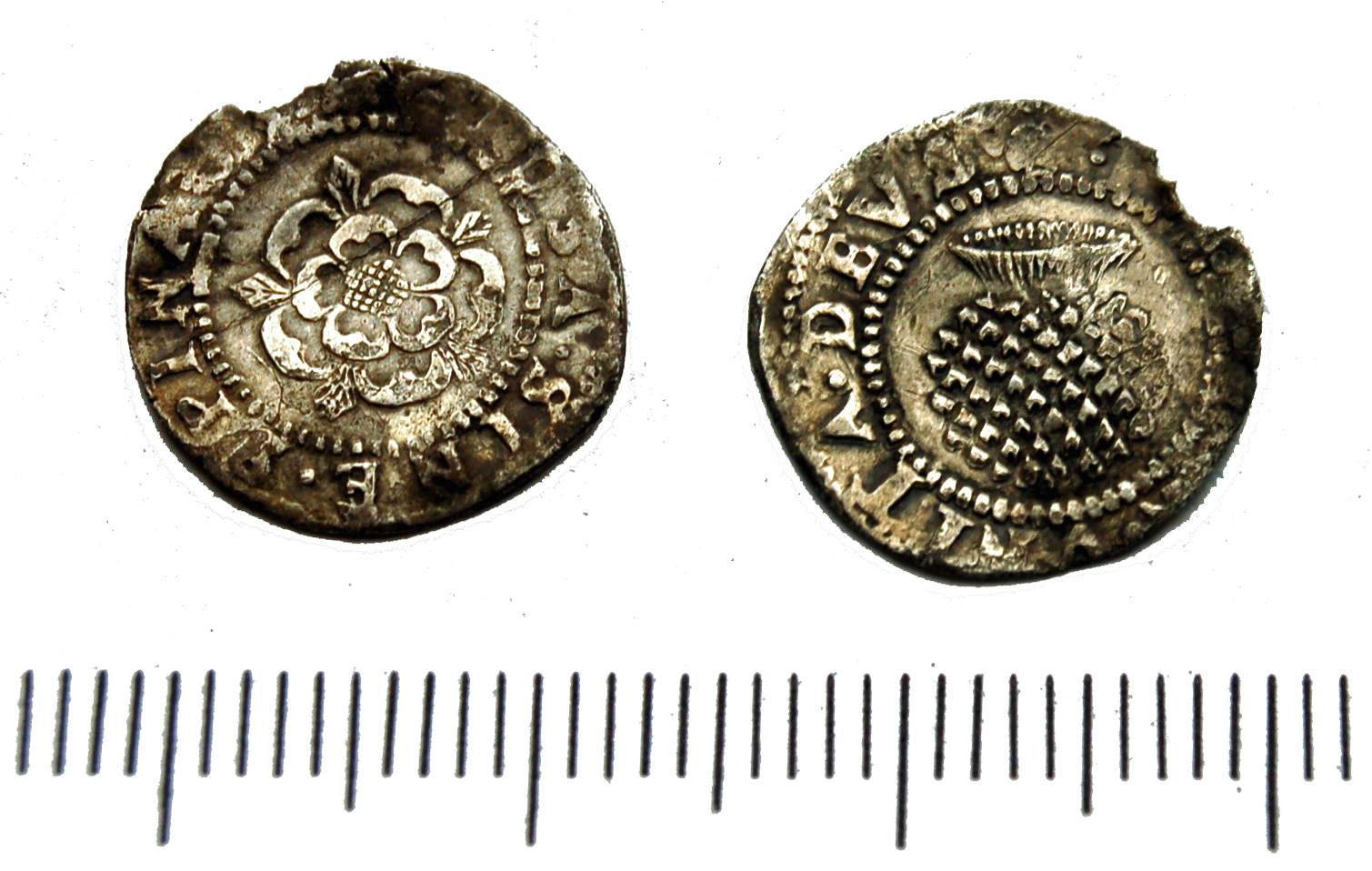
Silver penny of James I, with rose and thistle.

When Elizabeth died unmarried and childless in 1603, the throne passed to James VI of Scotland, a great-grandson of Henry VII, who ruled in England as James I. James's silver coinage changed little from that of Elizabeth in production and style. The most notable feature was the introduction of a copper farthing to help with the problem of small change. With inflation, the penny continued to become a less important denomination.

The first coinage, of 1603–4, shows a bust of the king facing right with the inscription I D G ROSA SINE SPINA on the obverse, and a shield including the Scottish coat of arms on the reverse. The second (1604–1619) and third coinages show a rose instead of the king's bust on the obverse, with the I D G ROSA SINE SPINA inscription, while the reverse contains a thistle surrounded by the inscription TUETUR UNITA DEUS – May God guard these united (kingdoms). All the coins were minted at the Tower of London.

In 1625 the 25-year-old second son of James I, Charles I, inherited the throne (his older brother Henry having died before his father). Unfortunately Charles's political judgment was appalling – he reigned for eleven years without convening the Parliament of England, as he was not disposed to accept direction from it when it was sitting, and the ensuing English Civil War eventually cost Charles both his crown and his head.

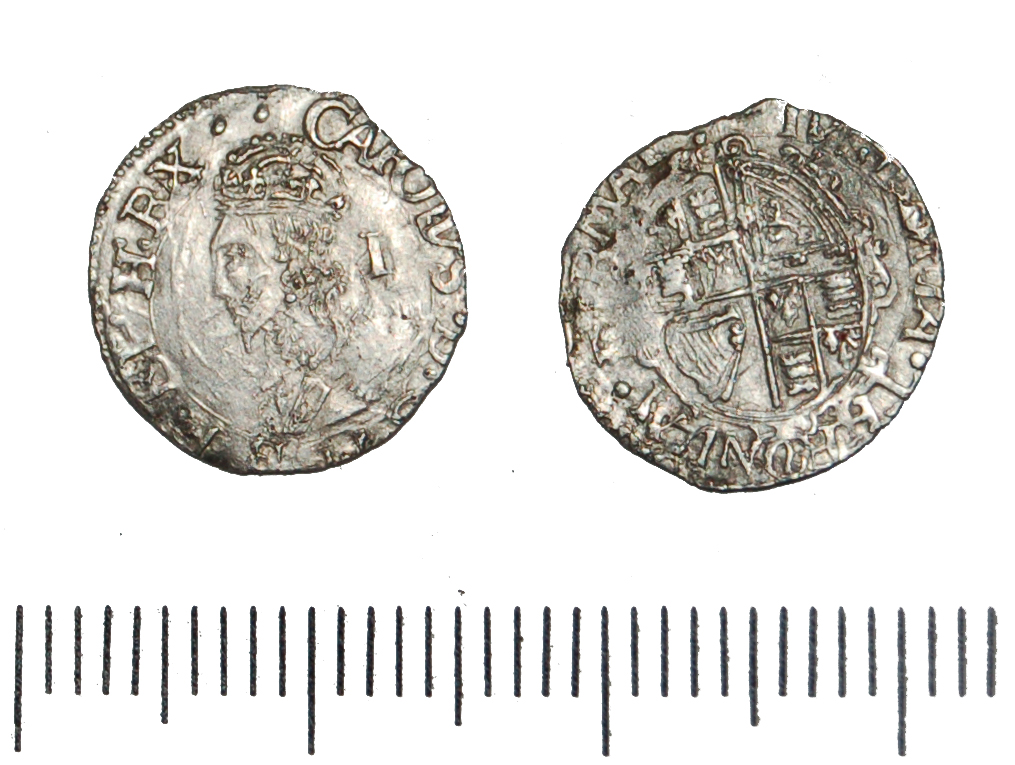
Charles I penny of 1642–46

Numismatically, Charles I's reign is without doubt the most interesting and complicated of any English monarch. Many varieties were produced at the Tower mint, and a number of provincial mints were opened during the Civil War, though as these were mainly opened to produce coins to pay the troops, the number of pennies produced there was quite low, as larger denominations were preferred. Between 1630 and 1639 the Frenchman, Nicholas Briot produced a milled coinage which for the first time included pennies. The quality of Briot's coins is superb, and one can only conclude that the only reason the Tower mint was not turned over completely to machine production was professional jealousy from the other workers.

Charles's hammered pennies produced at the Tower originally had a design of a rose on both sides, with the inscription C D G ROSA SINE SPINA on the obverse and IUS THRONUM FIRMAT – Justice strengthens the throne – on the reverse. Later pennies bore a bust of the king facing left with a I behind the head to denote the denomination of one penny, with the inscription CAROLUS D G MA B F ET HI REX – Charles by the grace of God King of Great Britain France and Ireland, while the reverse shows an oval shield and the IUSTITIA THRONUM FIRMAT inscription. Following the takeover of the Tower mint by the English Parliament in 1642, the same coin designs were produced until 1648 though with an older-looking bust of the king; this was to emphasise the fact that Parliaments' argument was not with the king but with his "evil advisors".

In 1638 a new mint was opened at Aberystwyth castle, Wales, to produce smaller coins (penny to half-crown) from locally produced silver. These are identifiable by having plumes (like the Prince of Wales's feathers on the 1967–2007 era decimal Two decimal pence coin) on the reverse. Following damage to the castle mint in 1648 there was a short-lived mint located at the actual silver mine in Aberystwyth in 1648/9, but no records have survived of what coins were produced there.

With the take-over by the English Parliament of the Tower mint in 1642, the king set up his permanent headquarters at Oxford and established his main mint there. Most pennies produced there were made from dies from the Aberystwyth mint, so they look very similar to Aberystwyth coins. There is a very rare "Declaration penny" produced in 1644 where the reverse contains the declaration RELIG PRO LEG ANG LIBER PAR 1644 – The religion of the Protestants the laws of England the liberty of Parliament. The Oxford mint closed in 1646.

Bristol was captured by the Royalists in July 1643 and a mint was established there, producing pennies with the plume reverse, but it was closed when the English Parliament recaptured the city in 1645. The Exeter mint which operated between 1643 and April 1646 mainly produced crowns and half-crowns, but also made some pennies.

=== The Commonwealth ===
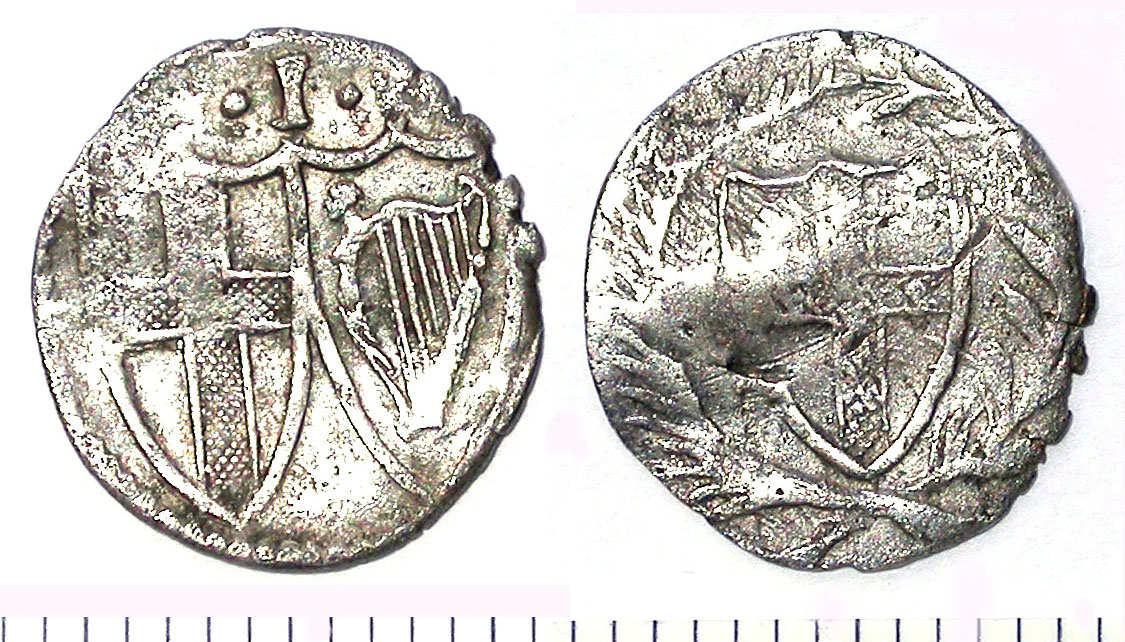
Penny of the Commonwealth, with English and Irish shields.

The Commonwealth of England (1649–60) is well known for having produced the only English coins which did not contain any Latin inscription at all. This was due to an association of Latin with Catholicism. As far as the Commonwealth penny is concerned, the inscriptions are totally absent. The reverse shows St George's shield within a wreath, while the obverse shows St George's shield and an Irish shield, with the denomination I above them.

=== The Restored Stuarts ===
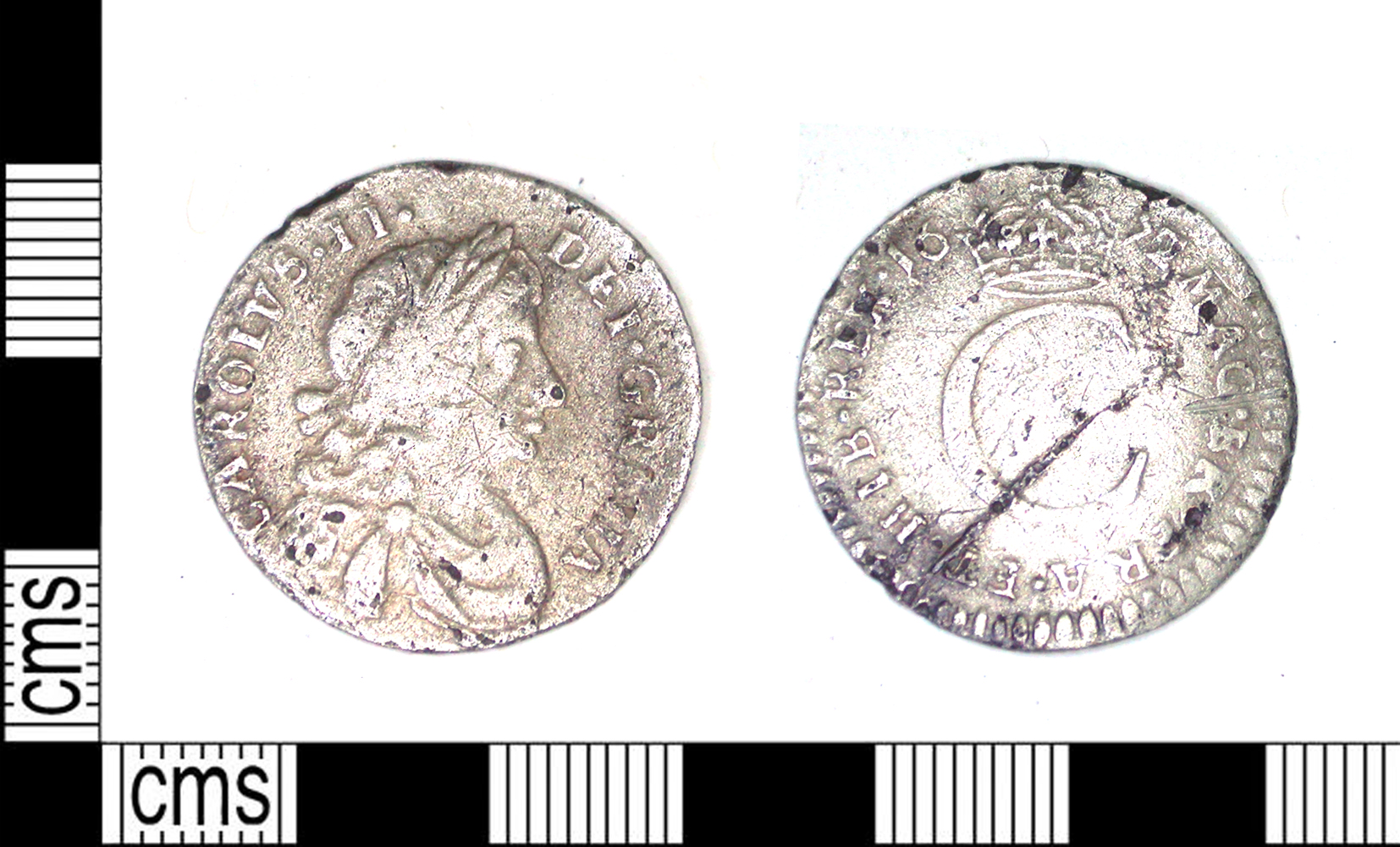
Charles II penny of 1672

Following the Restoration of the monarchy in 1660 in the form of Charles II, both hammered and milled coinage was produced until 1662. The penny was a fairly common denomination and was produced by both methods from dies produced by Thomas Simon. The obverse showed a left-facing bust of the new king with no value indication behind his head, and the inscription CAROLUS II D G MAG BRI F ET H REX – Charles II by the grace of God King of Great Britain France and Ireland. The reverse shows the king's shield over a cross, with the legend CHRISTO AUSPICE REGNO – I reign under the auspices of Christ. This issue marks the end of the English hammered coinage – all subsequent English and British coins have been milled.

The first regular milled silver pennies appeared around 1664 or 1665 and are undated, weighing 0.5 grams and being 12 mm in diameter. They show the king facing left, with I behind the head, inscribed CAROLVS II D G M B F & H REX, and the reverse shows a shield enclosing the Arms of England, Scotland, Ireland and France, inscribed CHRISTO AUSPICE REGNO. From 1670 to 1684 dated pennies were produced each year, showing the king facing right with the inscription CAROLVS II DEI GRATIA, while the reverse shows a crowned "C" with the inscription MAG BR FRA ET HIB REX date.

The same basic design continued in the short reign of James II (1685–1688) with the crowned "C" on the reverse replaced by a crowned "I" which acted not only as the king's initial "Iacobus" but as the indication of the denomination, 1 penny.

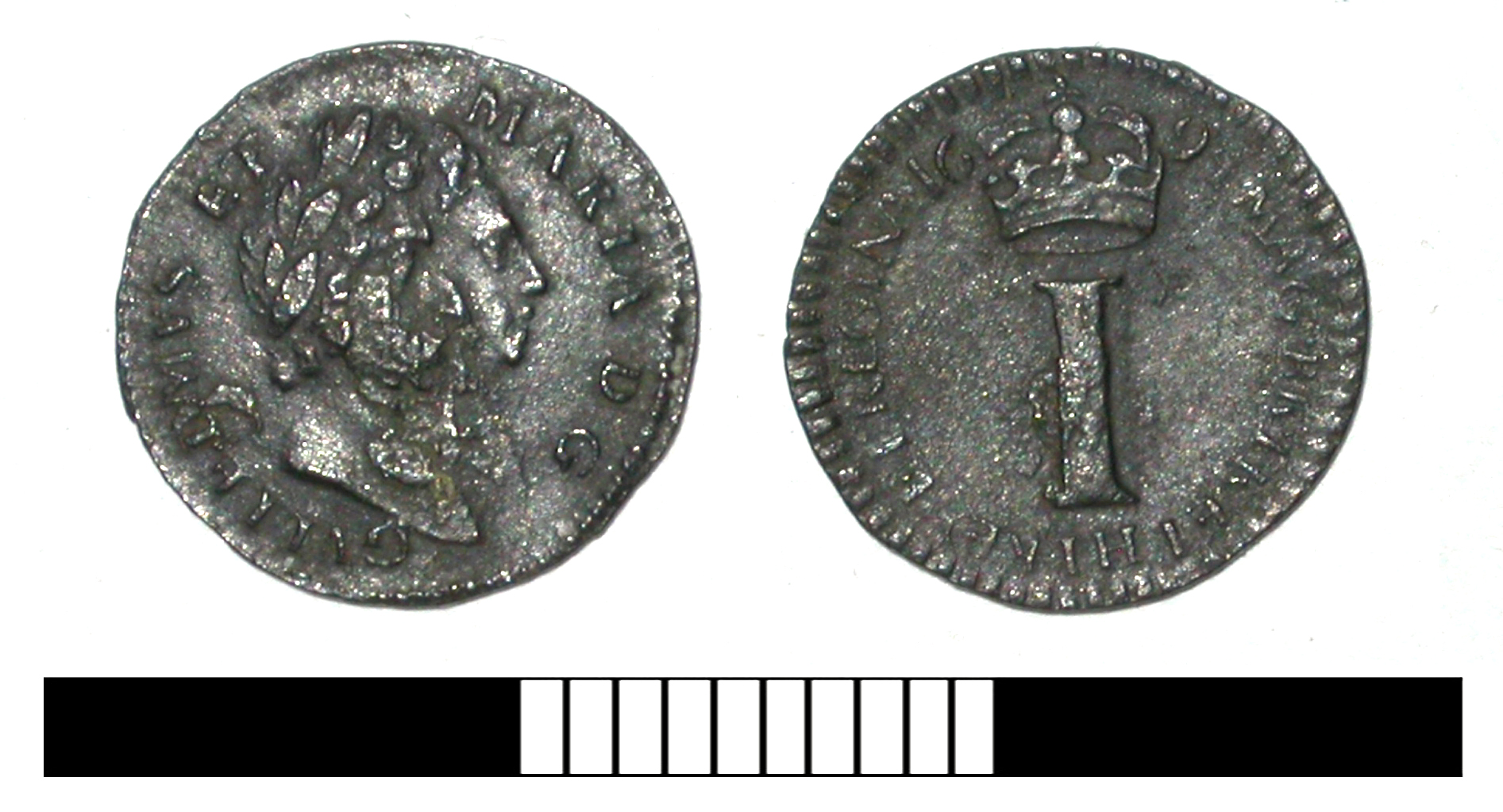
Silver penny of William III and Mary II

Following the birth of the Catholic James II's only son James Francis Edward Stuart ("The Old Pretender"), the English establishment determined to avoid the possibility of a Catholic dynasty on the English throne by engineering the Glorious Revolution, when the throne was offered to the older of James's two Protestant daughters from his first marriage and her husband, the Stadhouder of the Dutch Republic, who reigned as co-monarchs, William III (1689–1702) and Mary II (1689–1694). The silver pennies of this reign bear the combined heads of the two monarchs facing right on the obverse with the inscription GVLIELMVS ET MARIA D G – William and Mary by the grace of God, while the reverse still contains the crowned "I" which now represented only the denomination, with the inscription MAG BR FR ET HIB REX ET REGINA date – King and Queen of Great Britain France and Ireland.

Following the death of Queen Mary from smallpox in 1694 the coins continued with King William's head facing right and the inscription GVLIELMVS III DEI GRA – William III by the grace of God, on the reverse, and the crowned "I" and MAG BR FRA ET HIB REX date – King of Great Britain France and Ireland. Pennies were produced in 1698–1701.

== Anglo-Scottish Union ==
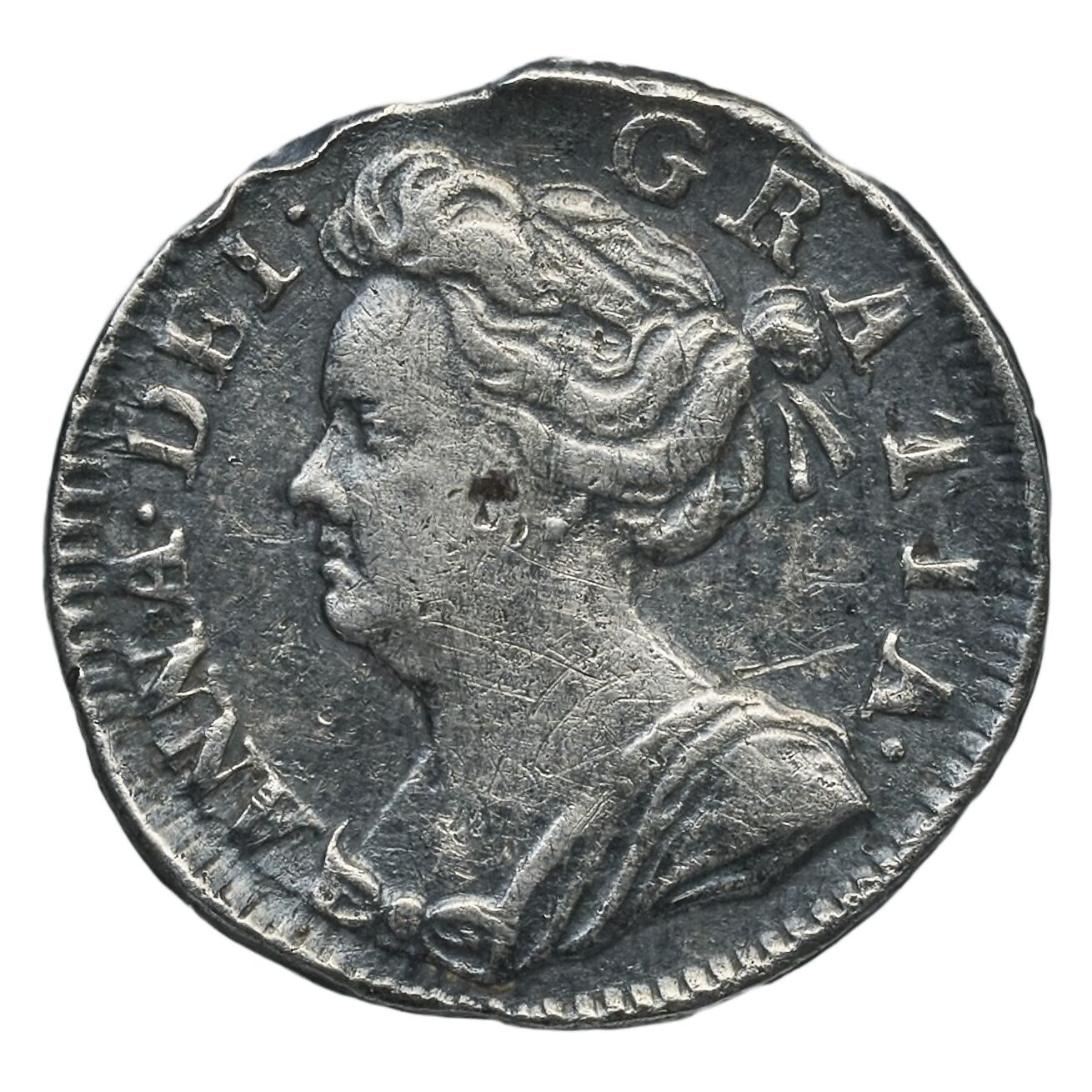
Penny of Anne (1703)

William III was succeeded in 1702 by Mary's younger sister, Anne. During Anne's reign the kingdoms of England and Scotland were united in 1707 (see Acts of Union 1707), to form what is usually referred to as the Kingdom of Great Britain. Twelve Pounds Scots were exchanged for 1 pound sterling so a shilling Scots corresponded to an English penny.

Despite having had ten pregnancies, none of Anne's children survived, and the Stuart dynasty died with her in 1714. In accordance with the Act of Settlement 1701 the crown passed to the Protestant descendants of Sophia, Electress of Hanover, in the form of king George I.

Anne's reign produced silver pennies in 1703, 1705, 1706, 1708, 1709, 1710, and 1713. The obverse of the coins show her left-facing bust with the inscription ANNA DEI GRATIA, while the reverse shows the crowned "I" and (1703) MAG BR FRA ET HIB REG 1703, (1705,6) MAG BR FR ET HIB REG, or (1708–13) MAG BRI FR ET HIB REG.
