= Pound Scots =

Currency in the Kingdom of Scotland until 1707

Pund Scottis (Middle Scots) Punnd na h-Alba (in Scottish Gaelic)
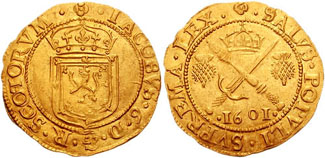
- Gold Sword and Sceptre coin of 1601, with a denomination of £6 Scots

Units of account
- Plural: pounds
- Symbol: £
- Subunit
- 2/3: merk
- 1/20: shilling
- 1/240: Penny Scots
- Symbol
- shilling: s. or /–
- Penny Scots: d.

Demographics
- Date of introduction: 12th century
- User(s): Kingdom of Scotland; Earldom of Orkney; Commonwealth of England, Scotland and Ireland (only used in Scotland)

Issuance
- Central bank: Bank of Scotland (1695–1707)
- Printer: Bank of Scotland (1695–1707)
- Mint: See Mints of Scotland
- This infobox shows the latest status before this currency was rendered obsolete.

The pound (Modern and Middle Scots: Pund) was the currency of the Kingdom of Scotland prior to 1707, after which Scotland became a country of the Kingdom of Great Britain and subsequently began using the pound sterling as its currency. It was introduced by David I, in the 12th century, on the Carolingian monetary system of a pound divided into 20 shillings, each of 12 pence. The Scottish currency was later devalued relative to sterling by debasement of its coinage. By the time of James III, one pound Scots was valued at five shillings sterling.

== Issue ==
Silver coins were issued denominated in merk, worth 13s. 4d. Scots (2/3 pound Scots). When James VI became King James I of England in 1603, the coinage was reformed to closely match sterling coin, with £12 Scots equal to £1 sterling. No gold coinage was issued from 1638 to 1700, but new silver coinage was issued from 1664 to 1707.

=== Acts of Union 1707 ===
With the Acts of Union 1707, the pound Scots was replaced by sterling coin at the rate of 12:1 (£1 Scots = twenty pence sterling), although the pound Scots continued to be used in Scotland as a unit of account for most of the 18th century. Today, there is no distinct Scots currency; but Scotland's three largest clearing banks (the Royal Bank of Scotland, the Bank of Scotland and the Clydesdale Bank) issue banknotes denominated in sterling. These notes may be accepted as payment throughout the United Kingdom, but are much more commonly seen in Scotland; their value is backed by non-circulating large denomination notes issued by the Bank of England (the "giants" and "titans").

== History ==
=== Origins and early coinage ===
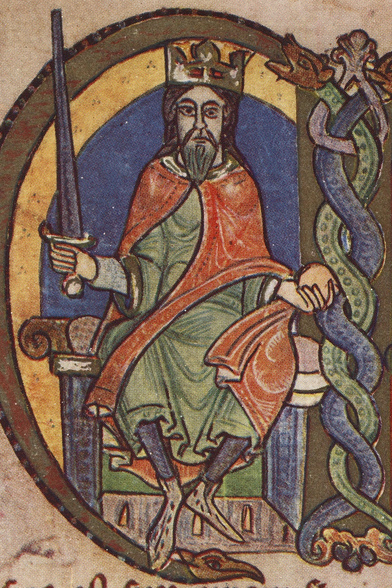
Introduction of Scottish coinage is typically attributed to David I of Scotland (1124–1153)

The monetary system of medieval Scotland developed within the wider European system based on the pound, shilling and penny. The Scottish pound was divided into 20 shillings, while each shilling contained 12 pence. The terminology derived from the Latin libra, solidus and denarius, conventionally abbreviated as £sd. The development of a distinct Scottish coinage is generally associated with the reign of David I (1124–1153). Scottish pennies were subsequently issued under successive monarchs and initially closely followed contemporary English monetary standards. Scottish coinage was produced at a number of mints, including Edinburgh and other important royal burghs.

During the Middle Ages, Scottish monarchs periodically altered the weight and fineness of their coins. The Scottish currency consequently developed characteristics distinct from English sterling, although the two monetary systems remained closely related. By the later medieval period, the Scottish coinage included denominations such as pennies and groats, as well as gold coins and fractional denominations.

=== Medieval development ===
The value of the pound Scots relative to English sterling changed substantially during the fourteenth, fifteenth and sixteenth centuries. Repeated debasements of the Scottish coinage resulted in the Scottish currency progressively diverging from English sterling. According to the National Records of Scotland, by 1560 five pounds Scots were equivalent to one pound sterling. The distinction between the pound as a unit of account and the individual coins circulating in Scotland became increasingly important. The merk was one of the most significant alternative units of account. It was valued at 13 shillings and 4 pence Scots, or two-thirds of a pound Scots, and was occasionally issued as a physical coin.

=== Sixteenth century ===
The sixteenth century witnessed substantial changes in Scottish coinage. During the reign of James V (1513–1542), a number of new denominations were introduced, including the bawbee and half-bawbee. Mary, Queen of Scots subsequently issued further denominations, including the hardhead, while gold and silver coinage continued to be produced in accordance with changing monetary standards. The continued debasement of Scottish coinage caused the value of the Scottish pound to fall significantly in relation to sterling. By 1560, the exchange relationship had reached £5 Scots to £1 sterling.

Scotland also periodically experienced shortages of domestic coinage. As a result, foreign coins circulated alongside Scottish issues, particularly in the sixteenth and seventeenth centuries. References to continental European coins can be found in Scottish testamentary records from this period.

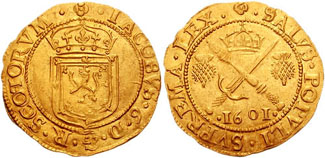
Coinage of Pound Scots under the reign of James VI of Scotland

==== Union of the Crowns ====
The Union of the Crowns in 1603, when James VI of Scotland succeeded to the English throne as James VI and I, marked an important stage in the development of the Scottish monetary system. Scotland and England remained separate kingdoms with separate parliaments and financial institutions, but the relationship between their currencies was stabilised. From 1603, the exchange rate was fixed at £12 Scots to £1 sterling. Consequently, one pound Scots was equivalent to 1 shilling and 8 pence sterling. The Scottish currency nevertheless remained a separate currency. Scottish coins continued to be produced at the Edinburgh Mint, while English coins were produced separately in England. The two systems therefore remained institutionally distinct despite the fixed relationship between their respective units of account.

=== Seventeenth century ===
During the seventeenth century, Scottish coinage continued to be issued under the authority of the Scottish Crown and at the Edinburgh Mint. A range of denominations was produced in gold, silver and base metals. The merk remained an important unit of account, while smaller denominations were required for everyday transactions. Although the exchange relationship of £12 Scots to £1 sterling provided a standard for accounting, Scottish financial records continued to distinguish explicitly between Scots money and sterling. This distinction is particularly important in interpreting historical records, including wills, inventories, land records, rents and other financial documents.

The pound Scots therefore existed simultaneously as a monetary unit and as an accounting denomination. The physical coins representing Scottish money varied over time in both denomination and metallic content, meaning that the nominal value recorded in an account did not necessarily correspond directly to the intrinsic value of the metal contained in a particular coin.

==== Bank of Scotland ====
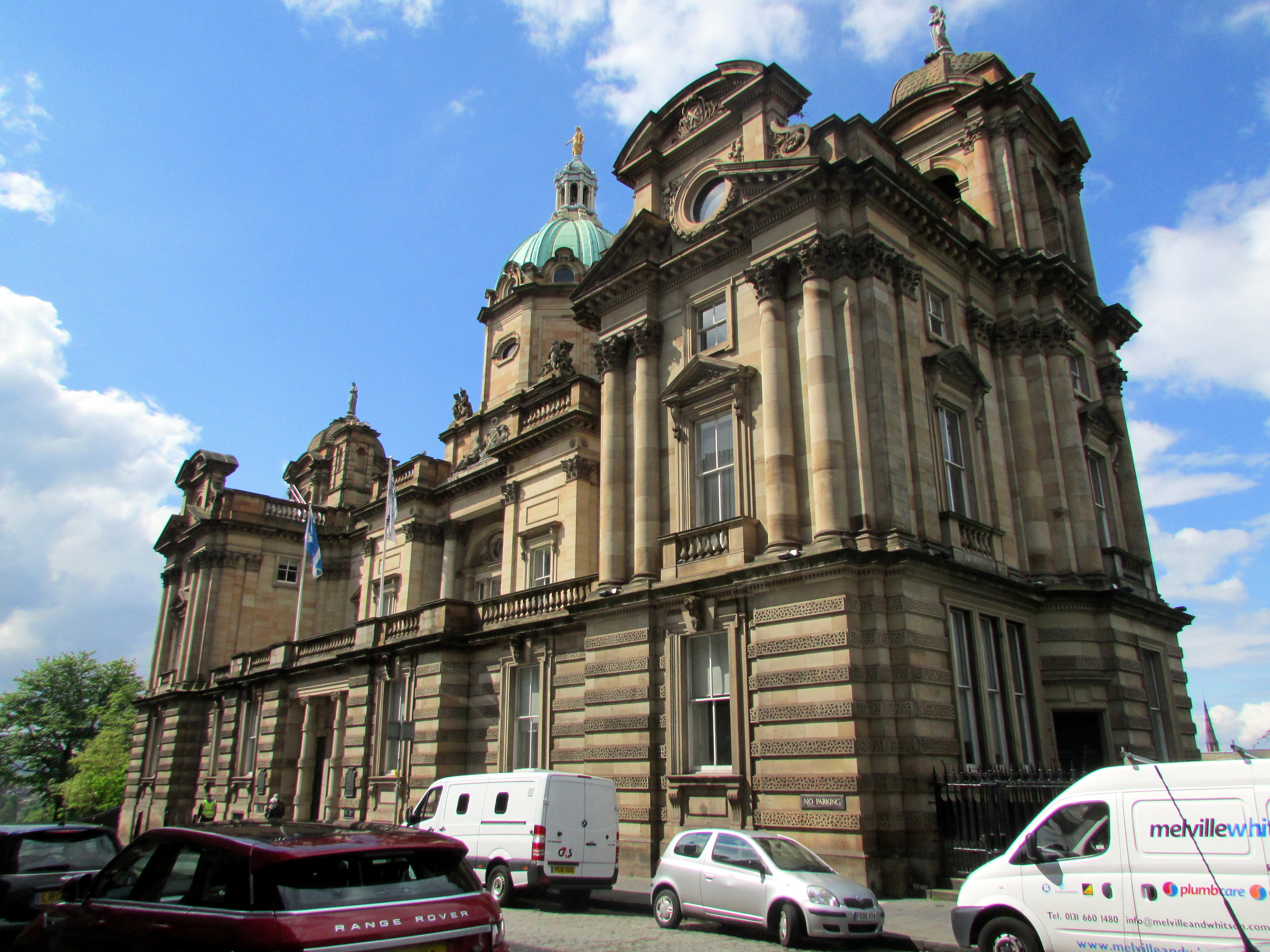
The Bank of Scotland, established in 1695

The establishment of the Bank of Scotland in 1695 introduced a new form of monetary instrument to Scotland shortly before the Union. The bank subsequently issued banknotes denominated in Scottish pounds. This development marked an important stage in the emergence of Scottish paper money and the wider development of Scotland's banking system. The pound Scots therefore remained an active unit of account at the beginning of the eighteenth century, even though its value had long been fixed in relation to sterling.

==== Acts of Union 1707 ====
The Kingdom of Scotland relinquished its independence along with the Kingdom of England to create the new state, the Kingdom of Great Britain (shown in green)

The Acts of Union 1707 united the Kingdom of Scotland and the Kingdom of England to form the Kingdom of Great Britain. The monetary arrangements of the Union were principally established by Article XVI of the Treaty of Union. Article XVI provided that the coinage of the newly united kingdom should have the same standard and value as the coinage then used in England. It also provided for the continuation of the Scottish Mint, subject to the provisions established for the coinage of the united kingdom. The Union consequently ended Scotland's separate monetary standard. Rather than maintaining the pound Scots alongside sterling, the Scottish currency was to be brought into conformity with the English standard. The monetary provisions therefore represented an important element of the economic integration created by the Union.

The Union also provided for financial compensation connected with the monetary changes. Article XV established the payment of The Equivalent, a sum of £398,085 10s, principally connected with Scotland's assumption of a share of the English national debt and the financial consequences of the Union.

===== Recoinage =====
Following the Union, Scotland underwent a major recoinage to bring its circulating coinage into conformity with the English standard. The process was undertaken principally between 1707 and 1709 and involved the Edinburgh Mint. The recoinage effectively ended the pound Scots as a separate physical currency. Scottish coins were withdrawn and replaced or converted in accordance with the monetary standard established by the Union. The Edinburgh Mint continued to operate during the recoinage, but the process represented the final major stage in the independent Scottish coinage tradition.

The pound Scots nevertheless survived for some time as a unit of account after the Union. Scottish rents, wages and the value of agricultural produce continued in some cases to be expressed in Scots money, demonstrating that the accounting convention outlived the separate currency itself.

=== After the Union of 1707 ===
The pound Scots continued to be used as a unit of account after the Union. Scottish records continued to express rents, wages, agricultural values and other financial obligations in Scots money. This meant that the pound Scots survived as an accounting convention after the physical Scottish currency had disappeared.

In November 2013, the Scottish Government published Scotland's Future, its detailed prospectus for independence ahead of the referendum scheduled for 18 September 2014. The document identified currency as a central component of its proposed economic framework. The Scottish Government proposed that an independent Scotland would retain the pound sterling. Its preferred arrangement was a formal currency union between Scotland and the continuing United Kingdom, commonly described as a "sterling union".

The proposal had been developed with the assistance of the Fiscal Commission Working Group, which examined a number of possible currency arrangements. These included continued use of sterling, the creation of a separate Scottish currency and membership of the euro. The Commission recommended retaining sterling within a formal monetary union as the preferred option for an independent Scotland. Under the proposed arrangement, monetary policy would have continued to be conducted by the Bank of England, but the Scottish Government proposed changes to the governance of the Bank. It proposed that monetary policy should take account of economic conditions throughout the wider sterling area and that Scotland and the remainder of the United Kingdom should have a shared interest in the ownership and governance of the Bank of England.

The Scottish Government argued that continuing to use sterling would provide continuity for individuals and businesses, reduce transaction costs with Scotland's largest trading partner and provide stability during the transition to independence. It also argued that the rest of the United Kingdom would benefit from continuing monetary integration because of the close economic relationship between Scotland and the rest of the UK. The proposal for a formal sterling currency union became one of the most controversial aspects of the economic debate during the referendum campaign. In February 2014, HM Treasury published an assessment of a potential sterling currency union and concluded that the United Kingdom Government should not enter into such an arrangement in the event of Scottish independence.

==== Later proposal for a Scottish pound ====
The Scottish Government's position on currency subsequently developed. Rather than regarding permanent use of sterling as the preferred long-term solution, more recent Scottish Government policy has proposed using sterling during an initial transitional period following independence and subsequently introducing a separate Scottish pound.

In its Building a New Scotland series, the Scottish Government proposed that sterling would initially continue to be used after independence. It argued that this would provide continuity for households and businesses while allowing time to establish new Scottish economic institutions, including an independent central bank. Under the proposal, an independent Scotland would establish an independent Scottish central bank and would introduce a Scottish pound "as soon as practicable", although no fixed timetable would be established in advance.

The timing of the transition would instead be determined by economic conditions and criteria established by the Scottish Government and subsequently assessed by the proposed Scottish central bank. The Government has argued that this approach would allow the transition to take place when the Scottish economy was sufficiently prepared rather than according to a predetermined date. The proposed Scottish pound would become Scotland's legal currency and principal unit of account, with government contracts, wages, benefits and taxes would be denominated in the Scottish pound, whilst Sterling would nevertheless remain capable of being used by individuals and businesses, meaning that the introduction of a Scottish pound would not necessarily prohibit the continued private use of sterling.

== Legacy ==
The pound Scots was therefore both a monetary unit and the basis of an independent Scottish system of coinage that developed over several centuries. From its medieval origins, Scottish money evolved through repeated changes in coinage standards and denominations, while its value increasingly diverged from English sterling. By 1560, £5 Scots was equivalent to £1 sterling, while after the Union of the Crowns in 1603 the relationship was fixed at £12 Scots to £1 sterling. The Acts of Union 1707 brought the Scottish monetary system into the common monetary framework of Great Britain. The requirement that the coinage have the same standard and value as that of England, followed by the recoinage of Scottish money, ended the pound Scots as an independent currency. Its use as an accounting denomination, however, continued in Scotland after 1707 and remained visible in historical and financial records for generations.

== List of coins of the pound Scots ==
David II (1329–1371): penny
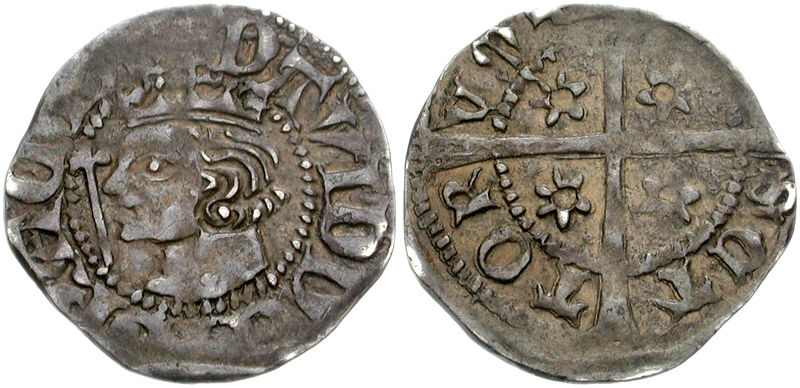
First side of the image: +DAVID DEI GRACIA, crowned head left; sceptre before
Second side of the image: [REX] SCT TOR Vm+, long cross; mullets in quarters
18 mm; 1.31 g; circa 1351–1357

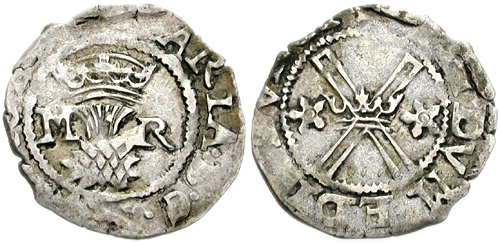
A bawbee minted during the reign of Mary, Queen of Scots

- Pistole – Gold, 12 pounds Scots
- Dollar – Replacement for the ryal, 60 shillings Scots (James VI)
- Ryal – Gold, 1565
- Crown or Lion – Gold (James I)
- Half-crown, Demi-Lion or Demys – Gold (James I)
- Ducat or "bonnet" – 40 shillings, 1539 (James V)
- Mark or merk – Gold (giving rise to the term markland)
- Noble – Gold, worth half a mark, 1357 (David II, reintroduced by Robert III)
- Unicorn – Gold, 18 shillings Scots, 1484–85 (James III)
- Half-unicorn – Gold, 9 shillings Scots (James IV)
- Testoun – silver, 1553. Was produced in France with the new process of mill and screw, being the first milled coinage of Scotland.
- Bawbee – Billon, six pence from 1537
- Shilling
- Groat – Silver, equivalent to four pence, from 1357 (giving rise to the term groatland)
- Half-groat – Silver, equivalent to two pence, from 1357
- Turner – Billon, two pence (James VI), later copper.
- Bodle – Copper, two pence (Charles II)
- Hardhead – also called Lion, billon coin circulated in the reigns of Mary and James VI
- Penny – Billon, one of the earliest coins, dating from David I. Later made of copper, giving rise to the term pennyland
- Halfpennies – Initially literally half of a penny, these became minted coins in their own right in c.1280. Later made of copper.
- Farthing or quarter-penny – These were originally quarters of pennies, but as with Halfpennies, became coins in their own right in c.1280. Later made of copper.
- Plack – value of four pence Scots or by 1707 one-third of a penny sterling

== See also ==
- Banknotes of Scotland (modern Sterling banknotes)
- Scottish coinage
  - Penny Scots
  - Merk (coin)
- Testoon (English shilling)
- Cutty-sark (witch) § Tam o' Shanter (Robbie Burns poem)
