= Plack (coin) =

Scottish coin

A plack (Scottish Gaelic: plang) was an ancient Scottish coin of the value of four Scots pence or, by 1707, one-third of an English penny.

== Issues and nomenclature ==
James III of Scotland started minting placks and two pence half-placks in Edinburgh before 1473. They were made of "billon", an alloy with a low silver content. The name of the coin comes from a Flemish word for a metal disc.

James IV of Scotland, who reigned from 1488 to 1513, issued two kinds of four pence placks, both minted in billon. The first issue has "Lombardic" mediaeval-style lettering, and the second issue used Roman capitals. There were also half-placks, valued at two pence. The half-placks are now comparatively rare.

Placks issued during the minority years of James V are slightly different in design from those of his father, and are sometimes called "Queen's Placks", referring to his mother Margaret Tudor. No half-placks were minted under James V.

== Revaluations ==
Placks and other copper-based coins were widely counterfeited, and in May 1567 the Privy Council of Mary, Queen of Scots, prohibited the circulation of forgeries under the pain of treason. An article considered by the Parliament of Scotland in December 1567 proposed the devaluation of the coins nonsunts, bawbees, placks, and hardheads, because of counterfeits or "false coins".

In March 1574, Regent Morton issued a proclamation to "cry down" or devalue unofficial placks and lions or hardheads (two pence pieces) made in the time of Mary of Guise. The order was printed and published by John Ross. These placks would now be current at two pence, and the lions at one penny. The coins were to be returned to the mint, and if found lawful marked with a Douglas heart and star and returned to the owner. Such countermarked coins are often found today. The goldsmith James Gray was in charge of the marking. The measure was intended to counter exorbitent prices and the large number of counterfeits. Morton's reform of the base money coinage was said to have caused hardship to the poor.

A chronicle writer compared the motifs of the countermark, the "mark of a heart" with heraldry carved on Morton's Gate, the Portcullis Gate of Edinburgh Castle, and said that the labourers who worked on the reconstruction of the castle after the Marian Civil War had been paid with base money. Proofs for new placks and bawbees were made by Abraham Peterson in April 1576.

== Placks of James VI ==
In 1588 the word plack was also used to describe coins of the value of a penny or two pence, the "tuppences" having two dots placed next to the lion of Scotland. These twopenny placks are known as "hardheads" today. Some contemporary counterfeits were made of copper blanks coated with tin, to give the appearance of billon.

In July 1593 the Parliament of Scotland authorised the minting of a four penny plack with two sceptres crossed and a thistle. This "saltire plack" was the last coin minted in billon alloy.

== The plack in Scottish literature ==
A letter written by Robert Constable in 1569 described how English and Scottish rebels drank ale played cards for "placks and hardheads" at the house of Thomas Kerr of Ferniehirst in Jedburgh.

The coin appears in the old song:

A’ that e’er my Jeanie had,
My Jeanie had, my Jeanie had,
A’ that e’er my Jeanie had

Was ae bawbie

There’s your plack, and my plack,
And your plack, and my plack,

And Jeanie’s bawbie.

The word is probably derived from the ancient Flemish coin, a plaquette, in use before the introduction into the Netherlands of the French money reckoned by francs and centimes.

It can be found in the works of Robert Burns too:

Nae howdie gets a social night,

or plack frae them

(Scotch Drink)

Stretch a joint to catch a plack,
Abuse a brother to his back.
(To Gavin Hamilton)

== See also ==
- Bawbee
- Bodle
- Pound Scots
- Scottish coinage
