= Bawbee =

Scottish coin, a sixpence

Bawbee from the reign of Queen Mary
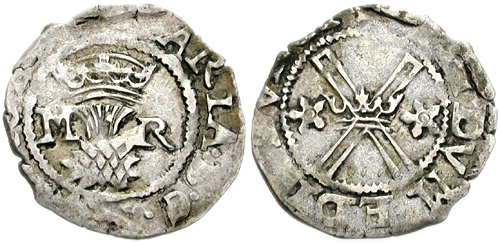
First side of the image: +MARIA D G REGINA SCOTORV, crowned thistle flanked by M R
Second side of the image: (lis)OPPIDVM EDINBVRGI, saltire cross with crown and cinquefoils
BI 21 mm, 2.35 g, 12 h. First issue, minted circa 1542–1558. Mint: Edinburgh

A bawbee was a Scottish sixpence. The word means a debased copper coin, valued at six pence Scots (equal at the time to an English half-penny), issued from the reign of James V of Scotland to the reign of William II of Scotland. They were hammered until 1677, when they were produced upon screw presses.

== Issues ==
The bawbee was introduced by James V in 1538, valued at sixpence. These carry his 'I5' monogram flanking a crowned thistle, and a large saltire on the reverse with a central crown. There were also a smaller half bawbee and a quarter bawbee. In 1544, James V's widow Mary of Guise minted bawbees at Stirling Castle, with an 'MR' cipher on the obverse and the cross potent with crosslets of Lorraine on the reverse.

The first bawbees of Mary, Queen of Scots, issued by the mint at Holyroodhouse in Edinburgh carried the cinquefoil emblems of the Regent Arran. Proofs for new placks and bawbees were made by Abraham Peterson in April 1576.

The bawbee of King Charles II was a copper coin with the reverse inscription Nemo me impune lacessit ("No one provokes me with impunity"), although the last word on these coins was spelled "Lacesset". This motto is still in use today on the edge of some circulating one pound coins. The motto is around a crowned thistle and is followed by the date. This coin was also valued at six pence Scots or half an English penny.

== Etymology ==
The word bawbee is derived from the familiar name of Alexander Orrok, Laird of Sillebawbie, who was appointed Master of the Scottish Mint on 13 August 1538. Following traditional Scottish custom, the public frequently referred to the mintmaster by his territorial estate name. This subsequently became the nickname for the sixpenny billon (silver alloy) coins issued under his authority. The existence of the laird and his title is verified by the Lord High Treasurer's accounts from 7 September 1541, which record: "In argento receptis a Jacobo Atzinsone, et Alexandro Orok de Sillebawby respective.". (Note: In silver, received from James Atzinson and Alexander Orok of Sillebawby, respectively.)

Sillebawby (also spelled Silliebawbie) was historically a farm in the parish of Burntisland in Fife, a moorland portion of the larger farm of Balbie (pronounced 'bawbee' (/bɔː biː/)). The estate name took various forms throughout its recorded history, including Sybbable (1328), Slebalbe (1328 and 1458), and Selybawbey (1517). Its later historic and modern names, such as Silverbabie (1642), Silver-baby (1654), and Silverbarton (current), likely arose as popular nicknames marking the land's historic connection to the mintmaster and his coin.

While Brewer's Dictionary of Phrase and Fable notes an alternative etymology deriving the word from the French bas billon ("debased copper money"), modern numismatists and linguists dismiss this as a speculative folk-etymology.

== Literary references ==
The bawbee was metaphorically used for a fortune by Sir Alexander Boswell, the son of the more famous James Boswell, the biographer of Samuel Johnson. It occurs in the song of Jennie’s Bawbee:

Quoth he, "My goddess, nymph, and queen,
Your beauty dazzles baith my e'en",
But deil a beauty had he seen
But Jennie’s bawbee

Sir Alexander took the hint of his song from a much older one:

A' that e'er my Jeanie had,
My Jeanie had, my Jeanie had,
A' that e'er my Jeanie had
Was ae bawbie
There's your plack, and my plack,
And your plack, and my plack,
And Jeanie's bawbie.

Brewer's Dictionary lists "Jenny's Bawbee" as meaning a "marriage portion".

After 1707 the Pound Scots was phased out. England and Scotland then shared what had been the English coinage, and in Scotland the term "bawbee" took on the meaning of a halfpenny, as can be seen in the poem Lament for Ancient Edinburgh by James Ballantine published in 1856 (see Luckenbooths article). The word was still current in the 20th century and continues to be used to refer to bawbee baps or cakes in Aberdeen (i.e. low-priced baps). A popular song, "The Crookit Bawbee", was recorded by The Alexander Brothers and Kenneth McKellar amongst others, and the tune remains a staple for Scottish country dance band music. The song has a rich suitor asking why his "bright gowd" and "hame... in bonnie Glenshee" are being turned down, the lady referring to a laddie when she was a young "bairnie", and her heart "Was gi'en him lang-syne, for this crookit bawbee." Inevitably the rich suitor turns out to be the laddie returned to his love.

The bawbee is referred to in the popular Scots song "Coulter's Candy":

Ally Bally Ally Bally Bee
Sittin on your mammy's knee
Greetin for a wee bawbee
Tae buy some Coulter's candy

=== Kirkmahoe ===
Wha'll hire, wha'll hire, whall hire me?
Three plumps and a wallop for ae bawbee.

The tale is that the people of Kirkmahoe were so poor, they could not afford to put any meat into their broth. A 'cute cobbler invested all his money in buying four sheep-shanks, and when a neighbour wanted to make mutton broth, for the payment of one halfpenny the cobbler would "plump" one of the sheep-shanks into the boiling water, and give it a "wallop" or whisk round. He then wrapped it in a cabbage-leaf and took it home. This was called a gustin bone, and was supposed to give a rich "gust" to the broth. The cobbler found his gustin bone very profitable.

=== Skipping rhyme ===
Ma Mam sez that Ah maun go
Wi ma Daddy's dinner-o
Chappit tatties, beef an steak
Twa reid herrin an a bawbee cake

== See also ==
- Bodle – Scottish coin
- Plack (coin) – Scottish coin
- Pound Scots – Currency in the Kingdom of Scotland until 1707
- Scottish coinage

== Sources ==
- Holmes, Nicholas. Scottish Coins: A History of Small Change in Scotland. NMS Publishing (1998) ISBN 1-901663-02-7
- MacKay, Charles. A Dictionary of Lowland Scotch (1888)
