= Unicorn (coin) =

Gold Scottish coin

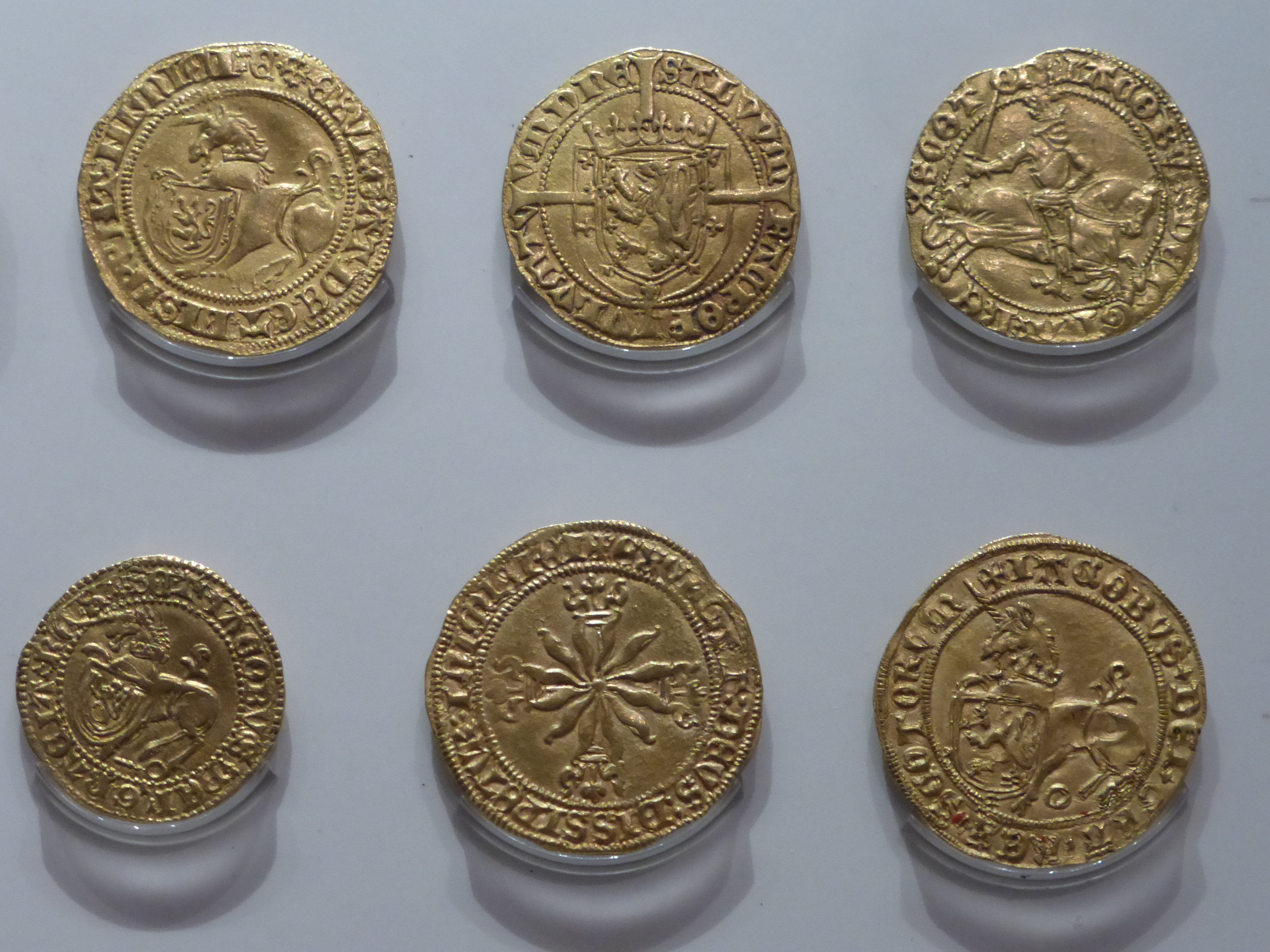
Scottish "unicorns" from the reigns of James III (top left) and James IV (bottom right)

The unicorn was a gold coin that formed part of Scottish coinage between 1484 and 1525. It was initially issued in the reign of James III with a value of 18 shillings Scots, but rising gold prices during the reign of James V caused its value to increase first to 20 shillings, and then 22. The obverse of the coin shows a crowned unicorn. The significance is that the unicorn is one of the heraldic symbols of Scotland, two of them occurring, most notably, crowned and chained, as the supporters of the royal coat of arms of Scotland.

== Use as a gift for foreigners ==
According to the British Museum, it became the coin favoured by Scottish kings when making gifts to foreigners, as in 1503 when James IV gave 100 unicorns to Lord Dacre, the English ambassador.

== Half-unicorn ==
A half-unicorn (lower left in photo) was introduced with a value of 9 shillings during the reign of James IV. It also rose in value due to gold prices under James V, first to 10, and then 11 shillings.

== Replacement ==
The unicorn was replaced during the reign of James V with the gold crown, or Abbey crown, which had a value of 20 shillings.
