= Pistole (Scottish coin) =

A pistole was a Scottish gold coin minted in 1701 under the reign of King William III. Along with the half-pistole it was the last gold coin minted for Scottish coinage. With a weight of 106 grains (6.9 grams; 0.22 troy oz), the coin was equal to 12 Scottish pounds.
