= Billon (alloy) =

Alloy of a precious metal with majority base metal content

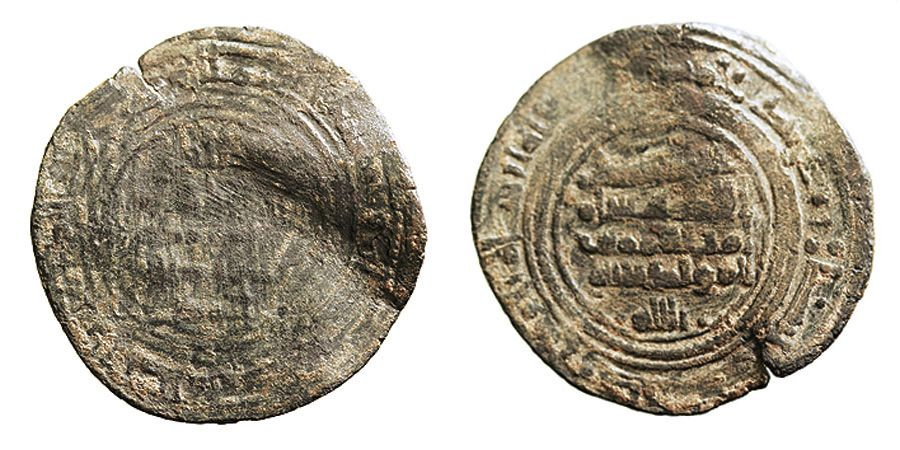
Billon dirham of Abbad II al-Mu'tadid, dated 439 AH (1047–1048 AD)

Billon (/ˈbɪlən/) is an alloy of a precious metal (most commonly silver, but also gold) with a majority base metal content (such as copper). It is used chiefly for making coins, medals, and token coins.

The word comes from the French bille, which means 'log'.

== History ==
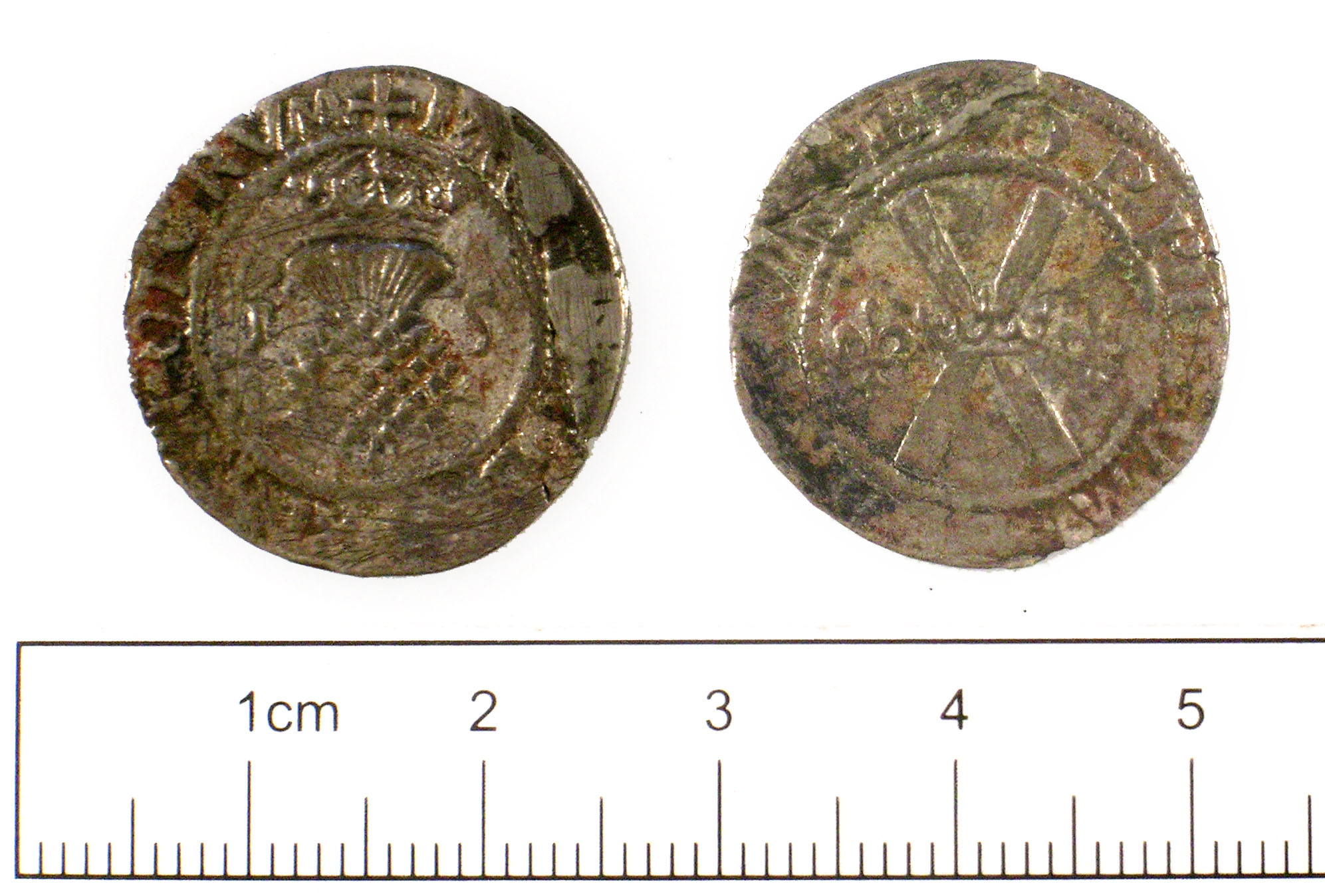
Billon bawbee coin of James V of Scotland (coined between 1538 and 1543)

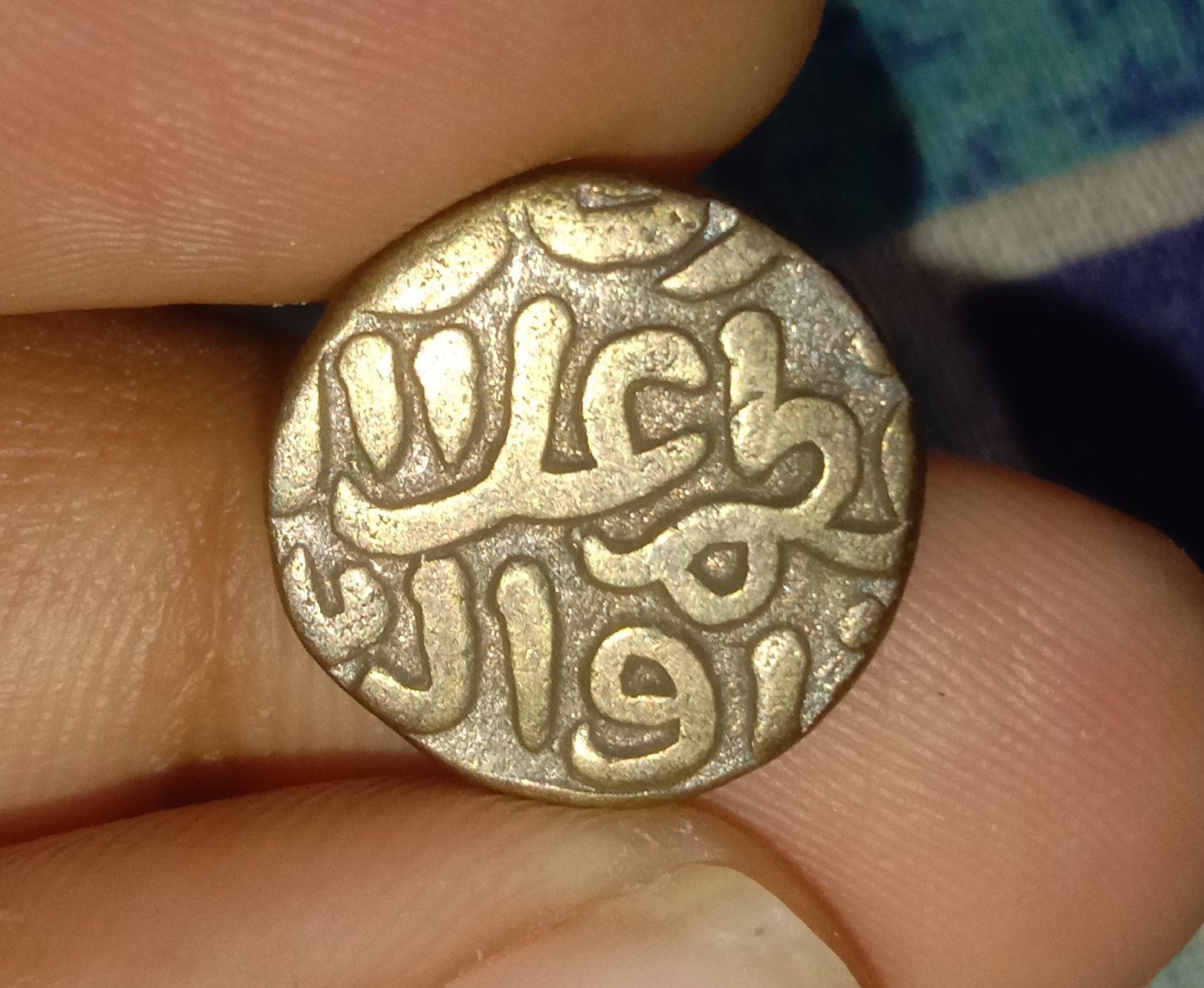
Billon two gani coin of Delhi Sultan Ala al-din Khilji

The use of billon coins dates from ancient Greece and continued through the Middle Ages. During the sixth and fifth centuries BC, some cities on Lesbos used coins made of 60% copper and 40% silver. In both ancient times and the Middle Ages, leaner mixtures were adopted, with less than 2% silver content.

Billon coins are perhaps best known from the Roman Empire, where progressive debasements of the Roman denarius and the Roman provincial tetradrachm in the third century AD led to declining silver and increasing bronze content in these denominations of coins. Eventually, by the third quarter of the third century AD, these coins were almost entirely bronze, with only a thin coating or even a wash of silver.

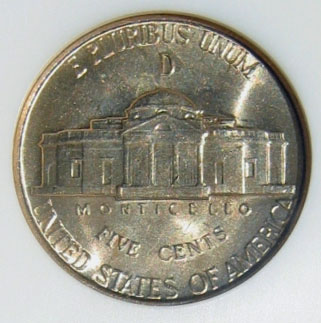
Billon nickel from 1942–45, with "D" mintmark and unusual color

Billon coins were frequently issued in varying finenesses up to about 37% silver for fractional denominations in eighteenth-century German states.

An example of a United States coin considered to be billon is the Jefferson nickel issued from 1942 through 1945. In order to save nickel and copper for the war effort, the composition of the nickel was changed to an alloy of 35% silver, 56% copper, and 9% manganese. These coins are easily identifiable by their color and by the presence of a large mintmark on top of the dome of Monticello.

Another twentieth-century example is the Mexican one-peso coin minted from 1957 to 1967, which was composed of 10% silver, 70% copper, 10% nickel, and 10% zinc.

== See also ==
- Potin
- Coinage metals
- Bullion
- List of alloys
- Antoninianus
- Shakudō
