= Galwegian Gaelic =

Extinct dialect of Gaelic

- Gallovidian Gaelic; Gallowegian Gaelic; Galloway Gaelic
- Gàidhlig
- Region: Galloway, Annandale, Nithsdale and Carrick, Scotland
- Extinct: 1760, with the death of Margaret McMurray
- Language family: Indo-European: Celtic; Insular Celtic; Goidelic; Scottish Gaelic; Galwegian Gaelic
- Early forms: Primitive Irish: Old Irish; Middle Irish; Scottish Gaelic
- Writing system: Latin script (Scottish Gaelic orthography)

Language codes
- ISO 639-3: –
- Linguist List: gla-gal
- Glottolog: None

Galwegian Gaelic (also known as Gallovidian Gaelic, Gallowegian Gaelic, or Galloway Gaelic) is an extinct dialect of Scottish Gaelic formerly spoken in southwest Scotland. It was spoken by the people of Galloway and Carrick until the early modern period. Other than numerous placenames and a song collected in North Uist, little of it has survived, so that its exact relationship with other Scottish Gaelic dialects is uncertain.

== History and extent ==
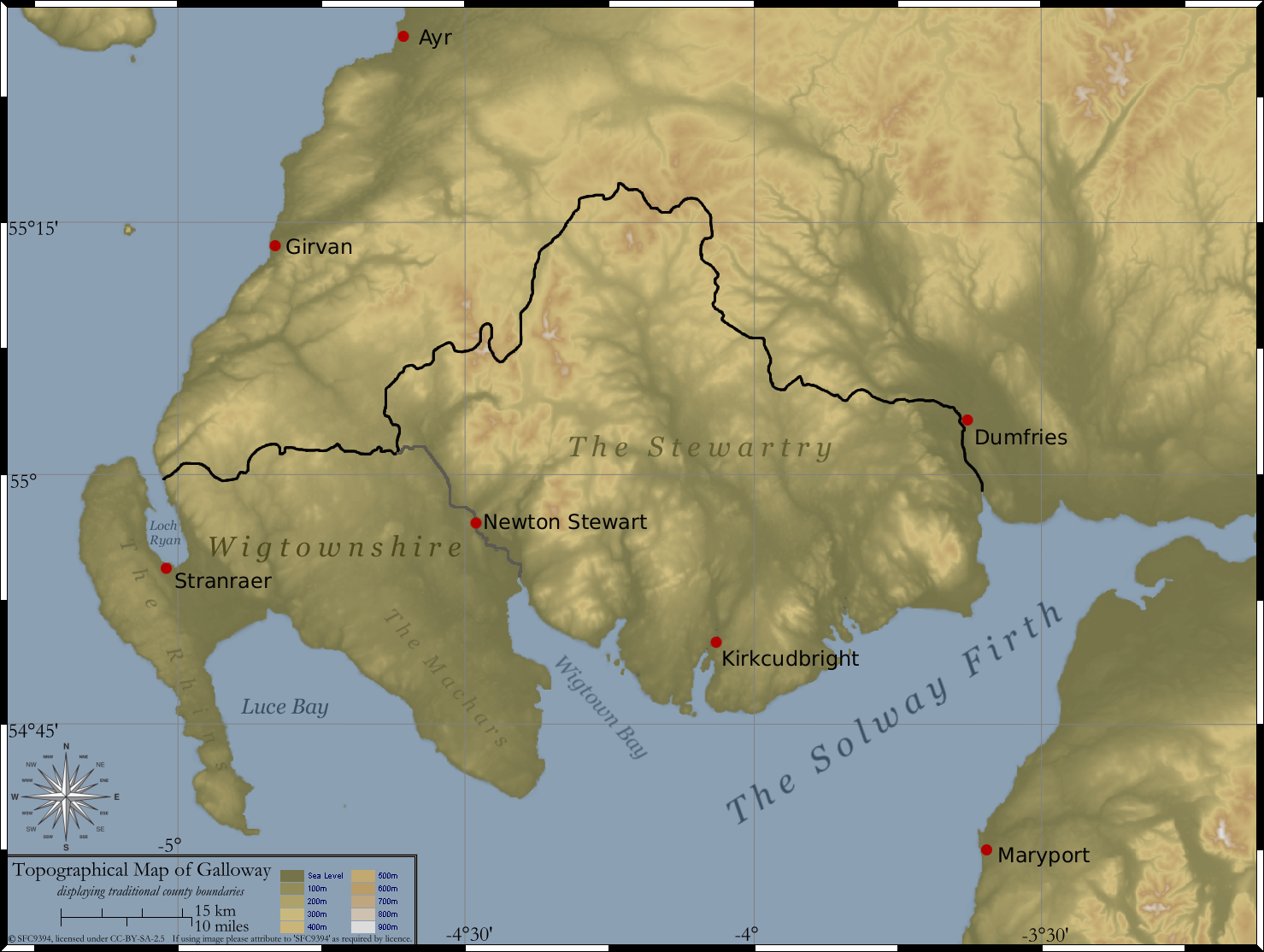
Area shows Galloway (marked) and Carrick. Carrick, roughly, is the area south of Ayr but west of Galloway. Carrick was detached from the lordship of Galloway in the late 12th century because of a succession dispute between two rival lines of the Galwegian royal kindred.

Gaelicisation in Galloway and Carrick occurred at the expense of Northumbrian Old English and Cumbric, a Brittonic Celtic dialect related to Welsh. Use of Old Irish in Scotland can be traced in the Rhins of Galloway from at least the fifth century. How it developed and spread is largely unknown. The Gaelicisation of the land was complete probably by the eleventh century, although some have suggested a date as early as the beginning of the ninth century. The main problem is that this folk-movement is unrecorded in historical sources, so it has to be reconstructed from things such as place-names. According to the placename studies of W. F. H. Nicolaisen, formerly of the University of Edinburgh, the earliest layer is represented by compound placenames starting with Sliabh "mountain" (often Anglicised Slew- or Sla(e-) and Carraig "rock" (Anglicised as Carrick). This would make the settlement roughly contemporary with what was then Dál Riata. The Gall-Ghàidheil (the Norse Gaels or "foreign Gaels"), who gave their name to the area, appear to have settled in the ninth and tenth centuries. Many of the leading settlers would have been of both Norse and Gaelic heritage, and it was the Gaelicisation of these Norse leaders which distinguished them from other Norse lords of northern Britain such as those in Shetland, Orkney and Caithness.

It is quite possible that even as late as the twelfth century, Cumbric was still spoken in Annandale and lower Strathnith (where a man called Gille Cuithbrecht has the Gaelic nickname Bretnach [=Welshman]), but these areas seem to have been thoroughly Gaelicised by the end of that century. A couple of legal terms also survive in medieval documents. The demise of Cumbric in the region is even harder to date than that of Gaelic.

The likely eastern limit reached by the language was the River Annan, for the reason that Gaelic placenames disappear quite rapidly beyond this boundary. In the north it was possibly cut off from other Scottish dialects in the 14th, if not the 13th century.

== Culture ==
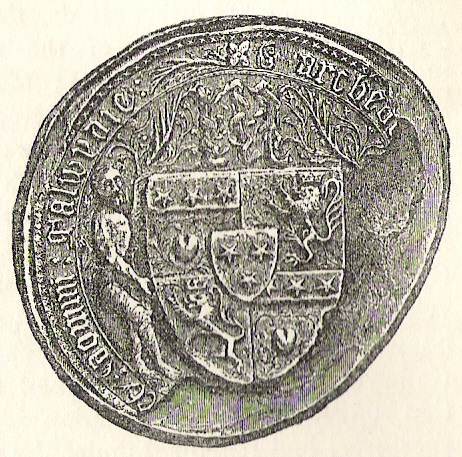
The seal of Archibald the Grim, Lord of Galloway. His arms are held up by wildmen, representing his conquest of the Galwegians. Archibald was a Lowland Scot whose family were of Flemish origin; he later became 3rd Earl of Douglas.

Gaelic-speakers in medieval Galloway, whom Richard of Hexham erroneously called Picts, had a fearsome reputation. They were the barbarians par excellence of the northern English chroniclers, said, amongst other things, to have ripped babies out of their mothers' wombs. It was reported by Walter of Guisborough in 1296 that during a raid on Hexham Priory, the Galwegians under William Wallace desecrated the shrine of St Andrew, cut off the head of the saint's statue, and threw relics into a fire.

Although Galloway was peripheral to Scotland until 1234, in the aftermath of the rebellion of Gille Ruadh and the dissolution of the Lordship, Galloway and allegiance of the Galwegian Gaels became critical. In many ways, the Wars of Scottish Independence were also a dynastic civil war, with the Bruces the successors of Gilla Brigte mac Fergusa and the Balliols the successors of his brother Uchtred mac Fergusa.

Under the post-1234 Franco-Gaelic lordship were several powerful kin-groups, or clans, for instance, the MacLellans, the MacDowalls, and Clan Kennedy of Carrick. It was probably through these groups that Galwegian society operated for the remainder of the Middle Ages. Evidence for a clan system in the area can be found in medieval records – cineal ('kindred') appears in such terms as kenelman ('kinsman'), and kenkynol ('chief[tain]', from ceann-cinneil 'head of the kindred'); muinntir ('household') appears in the name Muntercasduff; clann ('children', less literally 'progeny', 'family') in names such as Clenafren, and Clanmacgowin. A number of local surnames have Gaelic origins, e.g. Landsburgh (originally McClambroch), MacClumpha, MacGuffock, Hannay, McKie, McNay, Kennedy, and MacCulloch. The placenames Balmaclellan and Balmaghie may represent the site of chiefs' residences.

Evidence of a bardic class can be found in such placenames as Dervaird (Doire a' Bhaird) and Loch Recar (Loch an Reacaire).

Important information about local agriculture can be gleaned from placenames as well: shielings (àiridh) were in use e.g. Airies, Airieholland; manured infield from Talnotrie (talamh an otraigh) and Auchnotteroch. Gall-Ghàidheil agriculture is indicated in the use of peighinn and its subdivisions, e.g. Pinminnoch, Leffin Donald, Fardin; Daugh and quarterland (ceathramh) also appear, e.g. Doach, Kirriedarroch, Terraughty.

== Relationships to other languages ==
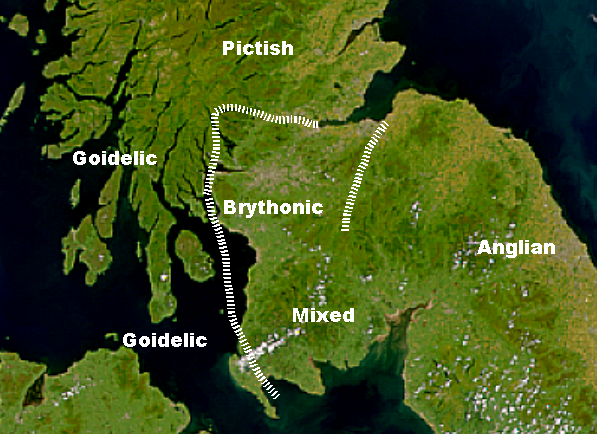
Possible language zones in southern Scotland, 7th–8th centuries (after Nicolaisen, Scottish Place-Names and Taylor, "Place Names").

Linguistic division in early twelfth century Scotland.

It is thought that Galwegian Gaelic probably had more in common with the Manx and Ulster Irish than with Scottish Gaelic as spoken in the Highlands. However, medieval Goidelic was a single language, spoken from Munster to Sutherland, with a universal educated standard and many regional dialects, which might have been mutually comprehensible. It is possible that the Gaelic dialect of the Isle of Arran parallels the Galwegian language most, but this is purely speculative.

Galwegian Gaelic may have borrowed certain words from Northumbrian Old English or Old Norse. The influence of the Anglian Bishopric of Whithorn, with the Norse Gall-Ghàidheil, could explain why the word kirk (ON kirkja, cognate with OE cirice, 'church') is used in so many placenames with Celtic second elements and word order. Cirice / kirkja occurs in medieval Galwegian placenames where, in the rest of Scotland, one would expect Gaelic cille, 'church'. Examples include: Kirkcormac, Kirkmikbrick, Kirkinner, Kirkcolm, Kirkcowan, and Kirkmabrick, and many others. In these names, the first word is Germanic and the second Gaelic. The word order is typical of the Celtic languages, with the adjective following the noun, rather than the Germanic adjective preceding the noun (cf. Dùn Èideann versus Edin-burgh). It is possible that this was a feature of the dialect, but it is also possible that most of these are the product of later English semi-translations.

Early English influence would not be surprising given the popularity of English saints. Kirkcudbright, for example, means 'Church of [St] Cuthbert'. Closeburn, earlier Killeosberne (Cille + Osbern) is another. A plethora of personal names confirm the influence of Anglo-Saxon culture. For example, the name Gille Cuithbrecht (also found in Manx as Giolla Cobraght) means 'devotee of [St] Cuthbert'. Another historical example is Gille Aldan, the name of the first bishop of Galloway after the re-establishment of that see by King Fergus.

== 1500 and after ==
An important source for the perception of Galwegian language is the poem known as The Flyting of Dunbar and Kennedy. The poem, written somewhere between 1504 and 1508, portrays an ideological, historical and cultural conflict between William Dunbar (representing Lothian and Anglic Scotland) and Walter Kennedy (representing Carrick and Gaelic Scotland). Dunbar ridicules Kennedy's Heland ('Highland') accent and Erische ('Irish', i.e. Gaelic) language, while Kennedy defends it, saying calling it "all trew Scottismennis leid" ('all true Scotsmen's language') and telling Dunbar "in Ingland sowld [should] be thy habitation". The salient point is that, from a Lothian perspective, as late as the early sixteenth century, Carrick and Galloway still represented Gaelic Scotland, just as Lothian did Anglian Scotland. Although Kennedy's surviving works are written in Middle Scots he may also have composed in Scottish Gaelic. In the Flyting, for instance, Dunbar makes big play of Kennedy's Carrick roots (albeit in the rankly insulting terms that are part of the genre) and strongly associates him with Erschry, 'Irishry', which meant in other words the Gaelic and bardic tradition; the term Irish in Scotland (and often England) signified Gaelic generally:

Sic eloquence as thay in Erschry use,
In sic is sett thy thraward appetyte.
Thow hes full littill feill of fair indyte.
I tak on me, ane pair of Lowthiane hippis
Sall fairar Inglis mak and mair perfyte
Than thow can blabbar with thy Carrik lippis.

Translation:

Such eloquence as they in Irishry use
In such is set thy perverse appetite.
Thou have very little aptitude for good verse-making.
I'll wager, a pair of Lothian hips
Shall fairer English make and more perfect
Than thou can blabber with thy Carrick lips.

Alexander Montgomerie (c. 1545 – c. 1610) was also a Gaelic speaker, and was termed the "Hielant Captain"; various Gaelic terms and phrases can be found in his works.

George Buchanan, himself a Gaelic speaker, writing in 1575, reported that Gaelic was still spoken in Galloway. In the middle of the century, 1563–1566, an anonymous English military investigator reported that the people of Carrick "for the most part specke Erishe".

After this, there is much ambiguous and indirect evidence that the language was spoken, if only fragmentedly, into the eighteenth century. Margaret McMurray (died 1760) is one of the last speakers we know of by name, although there are some suggestions that linguist Alexander Murray (1775–1813) may have learnt it from his aged father, a local upland shepherd.

It is safe to say, though, that the Galwegian language died out somewhere between 1700 and 1800. Nearby areas such as the Isle of Man, east Ulster (especially Rathlin Island and the Glens of Antrim), and Arran all had native Gaelic speakers into the 20th century.

== Corpus ==
The only known text is a Galwegian song collected from a shennachie from North Uist called Òran Bagraidh which was collected by the oral historian Donald MacRury from his schoolmaster. Although the song is broadly comprehensible, it contains many obscure words, shown in bold.

Scottish Gaelic text	English (fairly literal translation)
Aobh cumar an eas dom, Aobh bealach nan slògh, Aobh bruthaichean Beinn Beithich, Aobh an gleann san robh tu òg. Trom dom maduinn aon-là, Trom dom maduinn a' chro, Nì robh èirig air an eislig Caisteal a' chro.	Pleasant is the confluence of the waterfalls to me, Pleasant the pass of the hosts, Pleasant the slopes of Beinn Bheithich, [?Benbeoch] Pleasant the glen in which you were young. Heavy for me the one-day morning, Heavy for me the morning of blood, Your ransom was not on the bier The castle of blood.
Nar ro geis anns a' chro, Nir bu geis anns a' chro, **Fa** tu **deanma** bidh muid **diamain**, Lagaidh ceudan dìogailt linn. Buille **beada gom borr**, **Goille** grad beart doid, Com gun cholainn sliochd na feannaig, Dìogailt rinn-dearg **baradag** slìom.	There was no enchantment in the blood, There never was an enchantment in the blood, ? you ? we will be ?, Hundreds shall be weakened by is. A stroke ?, ? quick to act, A headless body to the kindred of crows, The vengeance of the red points ? slippery.
Riam righfinnid air an Fianta, Ro-sà ràthan rìghtech tu, Riam **ruighean** ràth na rìghinn, Rogaid **roighean** tu ar rìgh, **Saindsearc sighi** sorcha **seiti**, Caimbeart cruthach calma ceannt, **Supach suanach solma** socrach, Ceudnach **clota cleusta clit**.	Always a born leader of the Fianna, A great man in the king's house are you, Always ? in the queen's house, A chief among the ? of the king, ? bright ? No crooked ways, a strong ?, ? calm, The first ?.
Toinnti muinntir na dubh-chos, Inn san draodhnich 's ruigh raoin, Sloinnti cinneil sliochd a' mhaduidh, **Cingdi cairpech diaman** saoidh, Bhite breacach Loch a' Bharr, Bhite fiadhach Carrsa Feàrn, Bhite brocach Gleann na Seamraig, Bhite fleaghtach an Dail Righ.	Wrapped up in the people of the black foot, In their thorny places and grazing, In the genealogy of the people of the wolf, ? warriors. They would be fishing in Lochinvar, They would be deer-hunting in Carsphairn, They would be badger hunting in Glen Shamrock, They would be feasting in Dalry.
Do bhi treilis donna dosrach, Air an ruadhadh san **do dail**, **Greaghan congail tochadh sgola** **Seirbhti** sin an deireadh gnas. **Tarpa** sluagh na gruaigi ciar, Na cneas deathar cairti glas **Dosguin ciripti teasmailt brianta** **Sosguin foirprig teanmaidh bragh**.	Long ringlets of brown hair, Shalle be reddened in the ?, ?, ? the end of ?. ? of the dark-brown host, Of the dark tanned complexions, ? ?.

The song contains numerous examples of linguistic features associated with known Southern dialects (such as unlenited tu "you" and dom "to me" (usually thu and dhomh). The retention of the verbal particle in the last stanza do bhi is also highly unusual for a Scottish Gaelic dialect, as is the form inn san "in the" (usually anns an). The negative nì (usually chan) is also a feature more commonly associated with Irish dialects, rather than Scottish Gaelic.

== Modern influence ==
Although Galwegian Gaelic has left behind only one extant contribution to Scottish Gaelic literature and has been extinct for over two centuries, the Gaelic heritage of Galloway continued to inspire modern writers, such as the late William Neill, a poet who wrote in Scottish Gaelic and Irish, Lowland Scots, and English. Another example of the modern legacy is the "Gall-Gael Trust" founded by Colin MacLeod.

On 8 September 2018 a one-day conference 'Galloway: Gaelic's Lost Province' was held at the Catstrand in New Galloway.

Efforts are also ongoing by the Dumfries and Galloway County Council to promote both heritage language learning and the Scottish Gaelic Renaissance in the region.
