= Groatland =

A groatland, also known as a fourpenceland, fourpennyland or “Còta bàn” (meaning "white coat") was a Scottish land measurement. It was so called, because the annual rent paid on it was a Scottish “groat” (coin).

== See also ==
- Obsolete Scottish units of measurement
  - In the East Highlands:
    - Rood
    - Scottish acre = 4 roods
    - Oxgang (Damh-imir) = the area an ox could plow in a year (around 20 acres)
    - Ploughgate (?) = 8 oxgangs
    - Daugh (Dabhach) = 4 ploughgates
  - In the West Highlands:
    - Markland (Marg-fhearann) = 8 Ouncelands (varied)
    - Ounceland (Tir-unga) =20 Pennylands
    - Pennyland (Peighinn) = basic unit; sub-divided into half penny-land and farthing-land
    - (Other terms in use; Quarterland (Ceathramh): variable value; Groatland (Còta bàn)
