= Strip farm =

Strip farm may refer to:

- Strip farming, a method of farming used when a slope is too steep or too long
- Ribbon farm, a long, narrow land division, usually found in series lined up along a waterway
