= Hide (unit) =

Historical unit of land measurement

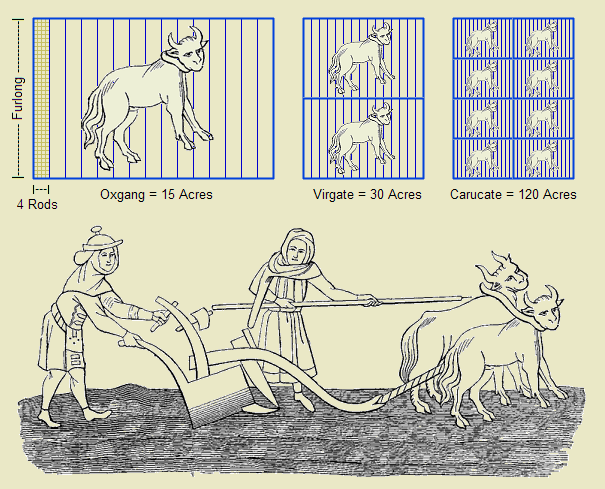
Farm-derived units of measurement: 1. The rod is a historical unit of length equal to 5 1/2 yards. It may have originated from the typical length of a mediaeval ox-goad. There are 4 rods in one chain.; 2. The furlong (meaning furrow length) was the distance a team of oxen could plough without resting. This was standardised to be exactly 40 rods or 10 chains.; 3. An acre was the amount of land tillable by one man behind one team of eight oxen in one day. Traditional acres were long and narrow due to the difficulty in turning the plough and the value of river front access.; 4. An oxgang was the amount of land tillable by one ox in a ploughing season. This could vary from village to village, but was typically around 15 acres.; 5. A virgate was the amount of land tillable by two oxen in a ploughing season.; 6. A carucate was the amount of land tillable by a team of eight oxen in a ploughing season. This was equal to 8 oxgangs or 4 virgates.

The hide (or mansa) is an archaic English unit of land measurement originally intended to represent the amount of land sufficient to support a household. It is a measure of value and tax assessment, including obligations for food-rent (feorm), maintenance and repair of bridges and fortifications, manpower for the army (fyrd), and (eventually) the geld land tax. The hide was divided into four yardlands or virgates. It was hence nominally equivalent in area to a carucate, a unit used in the Danelaw.

The hide's method of calculation is now obscure: different properties with the same hidage could vary greatly in extent even in the same county. Following the Norman Conquest of England, the hidage assessments were recorded in the Domesday Book of 1086, and there was a tendency for land producing £1 of income per year to be assessed at 1 hide. The Norman kings continued to use the unit for their tax assessments until the end of the 12th century.

== Original meaning ==
The Anglo-Saxon word for a hide was hid (or its synonym hiwisc). Both words are believed to be derived from the same root hiwan, meaning "family". Bede in his Ecclesiastical History (c. 731) describes the extent of a territory by the number of families which it supported, as (for instance), in Latin, terra x familiarum meaning 'a territory of ten families'. In the Anglo-Saxon version of the same work hid or hiwan is used in place of terra ... familiarum. Other documents of the period show the same equivalence and it is clear that the word hide originally signified land sufficient for the support of a peasant and his household or of a family, which may have had an extended meaning. It is uncertain whether it meant the immediate family or a more extensive group.

Charles-Edwards suggests that in its early usage it referred to the land of one family, worked by one plough and that ownership of a hide conferred the status of a freeman, whom Stenton refers as "the independent master of a peasant household".

== Holy Roman Empire ==
Hides of land formed the basis for tax levies used to equip free warriors (milites) of the Holy Roman Empire. In 807 it was specified that in the region west of the Seine, for example, a vassal who held four or five hides was responsible for showing up to a muster in person, fully equipped for war. Three men who each possessed one hide were grouped such that two of them were responsible for equipping the third, who would go to war in their name. Those holding half-hides were responsible for readying one man for every group of six. This came about as a way of ensuring that the liege took to the field with a fully equipped and provisioned force.

== Anglo-Saxon England ==
In early Anglo-Saxon England, the hide was used as the basis for assessing the amount of food rent (known as feorm) due from a village or estate, and it became the unit on which all public obligations were assessed, including in particular the maintenance and repair of bridges and fortifications and the provision of troops to man the defences of a town or for the defence force known as the fyrd. For instance, at one period, five hides were expected to provide one fully armed soldier in the king's service, and one man from every hide was to be liable to do garrison duty for the burhs and to help in their initial construction and upkeep.

A land tax known as gafol by the Anglo-Saxons was first levied in 991 during the reign of Æthelred the Unready following the Battle of Maldon. This became known as the Danegeld, as its purpose was to buy off the Danes who were then raiding and invading the country. It was raised again for the same purpose on several occasions. The already existing system of assessment of land in hides was utilised to raise the geld, which was levied at a stated rate per hide (e.g. two shillings per hide). Subsequently, the same system was used for general taxation and the geld was raised as required.

The hide was a measure of value rather than a measurement of area, but the logic of its assessment is not clear, especially as assessments changed from time to time and were not always consistent. By the end of the Anglo-Saxon period, it was a measure of the taxable worth of an area of land, but it had no fixed relationship to its area, the number of ploughteams working on it, or its population; nor was it limited to the arable land on an estate. According to Bailey, "It is a commonplace that the hide in 1086 had a very variable extent on the ground; the old concept of 120 acres cannot be sustained." Many details of the development of the system during the 350 years which elapsed between the time of Bede and the Domesday Book remain obscure. According to historian Frank Stenton, "Despite the work of many great scholars the hide of early English texts remains a term of elusive meaning."

The fact that assessments tended to be made in multiples of 5 hides indicates the hide is not measured in terms of area, and this applies to the 11th century as well as to charters of the 7th and 8th centuries. The hide became the basis of a system of assessment of land for purposes of taxation, which lasted for a long period. The most consistent aspect of the hide is described by Sally Harvey (referring particularly to Domesday Book): "Both Maitland and Vinogradoff long ago noticed that there was a general tendency throughout Domesday for a hide of land to be worth £1, or, put another way, for land producing £1 of income to be assessed at one hide."

The document known as the Tribal Hidage is a very early list thought to date possibly from the 7th century but known only from a later and unreliable manuscript. It is a list of tribes and small kingdoms owing tribute to an overlord and of the proportionate liability or quota imposed on each of them. This is expressed in terms of hides, though we have no details as to how these were arrived at nor how they were converted into a cash liability. The Burghal Hidage (early 10th century) is a list of boroughs giving the hide assessments of neighbouring districts which were liable to contribute to the defence of the borough, each contributing to the maintenance and manning of the fortifications in proportion to the number of hides for which they answered.

The County Hidage (early 11th century) lists the number of hides to be assessed on each county, and it seems that by this time at least, the number of hides in a given area was imposed from above. Each county was assigned a round number of hides, for which it would be required to answer. For instance, Northamptonshire was assigned 3,200 hides while Staffordshire was assigned 500. This number was then divided up between the hundreds in the county. Theoretically there were 100 hides in each hundred, but this proportion was often not maintained, for example because of changes in the hundreds or in the estates comprising them, or because assessments were altered when the actual cash liability was perceived as too high or too low, or for other reasons now unknown. The hides within each hundred were then divided between villages, estates or manors, usually in blocks or multiples of 5 hides, though this was not always maintained. Differences from the norm could result from estates being moved from one hundred to another, or from adjustments to the size of an estate or alterations in the number of hides for which an estate should answer.

As each local community had the task of deciding how its quota of hides should be divided between the lands held by that community, different communities used different criteria, depending on the type of land held and on the way in which an individual's wealth was reckoned within that community; thus it is self-evident that no single comprehensive definition is possible.

== Norman England ==
The Normans continued to use the system which they found in place. Geld was levied at intervals on the existing hidage assessments. In 1084 William I laid an exceptionally heavy geld of six shillings upon every hide. At the time the value of the hide was approximating 20 shillings per year, and the price of an ox was two shillings. Thus the holder of a hide had a tax burden equivalent to three of his oxen and roughly one-third of the annual value of his land. A more normal rate was 2 shillings on each hide.

Domesday Book, recording the results of the survey made on the orders of William I in 1086, states in hides (or carucates or sulungs as the case might be) the assessed values of estates throughout the area covered by the survey. Usually it gives this information for 1086 and 1066, but some counties were different and only showed this information for one of those dates. By that time the assessments showed many anomalies. Many of the hide assessments on lands held by tenants-in-chief were reduced between 1066 and 1086 in order to effect an exemption from or reduction in tax; this again shows that the hide was a tax assessment, not an area of land.

Sometimes the assessment in hides is given both for the whole manor and for the demesne land (i.e. the lord's own demesne) included in it. Harvey suggests that the ploughland data in Domesday Book was intended to be used for a complete re-assessment, but if so it was never actually made. The Pipe Rolls, where they are available, show that levies were based largely on the old assessments, though with some amendments and exemptions. The last recorded levy was for 1162–63 during the reign of Henry II; but the tax was not formally abolished, and Henry II thought of using it again between 1173 and 1175. The old assessments were used for a tax on land in 1193–94 to raise money for King Richard's ransom.

== Relationship to other terms ==
A hide was usually made up of four virgates, although exceptionally Sussex had eight virgates to the hide. A similar measure was used in the northern Danelaw, known as a carucate, consisting of eight bovates, and Kent used a system based on a sulung, consisting of four yokes, which was larger than the hide and on occasion treated as equivalent to two hides. These measures had a different origin, signifying the amount of land which could be cultivated by one plough team as opposed to a family holding, but all later became artificial fiscal assessments.

In some counties in Domesday Book (e.g. Cambridgeshire), the hide is sometimes shown as consisting of 120 acres (30 acres to the virgate), but as Darby explains: "The acres are, of course, not units of area, but geld acres, i.e. units of assessment". In other words, this was a way of dividing the tax assessment on the hide between several owners of parts of the land assessed. The owner of land assessed at 40 notional (or fiscal) acres in a village assessed at 10 hides and paying geld of 2 shillings per hide would be responsible for one-third (40/120) of 2 shillings—that is, 8 pence—though his land might be considerably more or less than 40 modern statute acres in extent.
