= Township (Scotland) =

Subdivision of land in Scotland

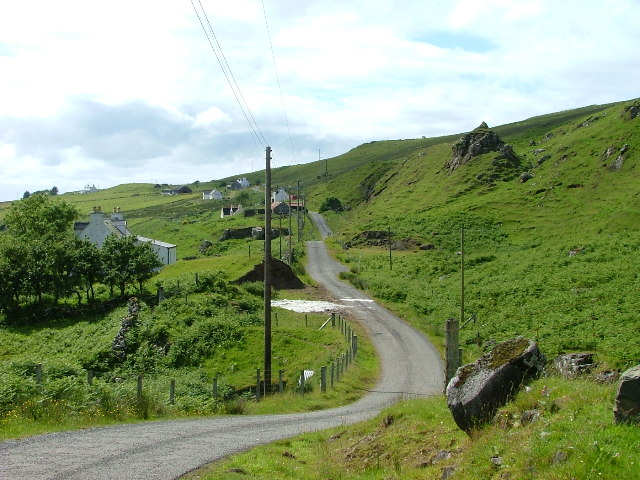
In northern and western areas of Scotland, many people live in small crofting townships, such as here on the Isle of Skye.

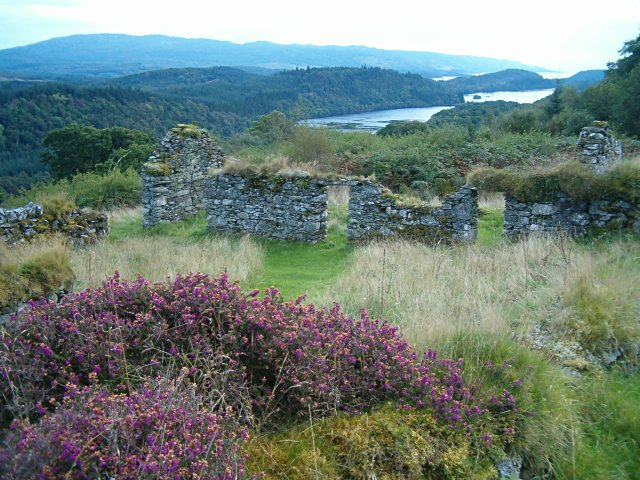
Ruins of the township of Arichonan, forcibly cleared in 1848 as part of the Highland Clearances. Caol Scotnish can be seen in the middle distance with Loch Sween farther out.

In Scotland a crofting township is a group of agricultural smallholdings (each with its own few hectares of pasture and arable land (in-bye land)) holding in common a substantial tract of unimproved upland grazing. Each township comprises a formal legal unit. Like older Scottish land measurements, such as the davoch, quarterland and oxgang, the extent of a township often varies according to the quality of the land it is on, and this can range from a hundred to a few thousand hectares. There is often a substantial tract of unimproved upland common grazing - known as a "shieling" or "àirigh" which is held in common. This tends to be used in the summer, but with the advent of fertilisers it is often used in colder times as well.

In reference to the history of Scotland, a township is often called a toun (the Lowland Scots word for a township), although before the Anglic language Scots became widespread in Scotland the word baile was more commonly used.

Traditional townships were largely wiped out during the Highland Clearances. Auchindrain in Argyll, once occupied by up to seven tenant families who farmed the land cooperatively, was the last to survive. This was down to the 19th century landowner, the 8th Duke of Argyll, who decided that splitting the township into individual crofts would not be financially viable and encouraged his tenants to modernise their methods. The final tenant departed Auchindrain in 1963. The traditional houses and other buildings still stand, and have been turned into an open-air museum.

== See also ==
- Townland
- Quarterland
- Davoch
- Half-foot
- Clachan
