= Carucate =

Medieval land unit from England and Scotland

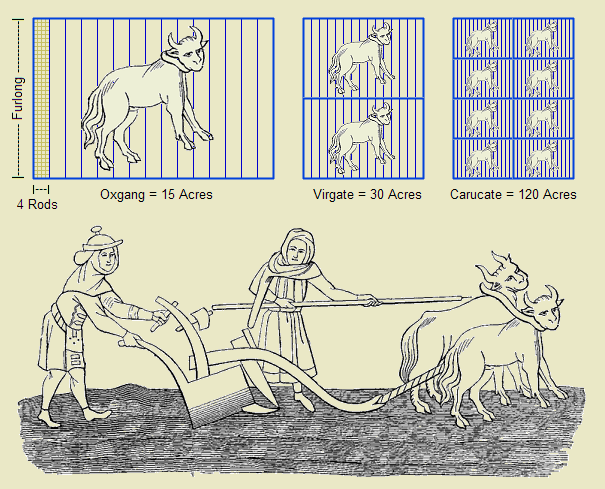
Farm-derived units of measurement: 1. The rod is a historical unit of length equal to 5 1/2 yards. It may have originated from the typical length of a mediaeval ox-goad. There are 4 rods in one chain.; 2. The furlong (meaning furrow length) was the distance a team of oxen could plough without resting. This was standardised to be exactly 40 rods or 10 chains.; 3. An acre was the amount of land tillable by one man behind one team of eight oxen in one day. Traditional acres were long and narrow due to the difficulty in turning the plough and the value of river front access.; 4. An oxgang was the amount of land tillable by one ox in a ploughing season. This could vary from village to village, but was typically around 15 acres.; 5. A virgate was the amount of land tillable by two oxen in a ploughing season.; 6. A carucate was the amount of land tillable by a team of eight oxen in a ploughing season. This was equal to 8 oxgangs or 4 virgates.

The carucate or carrucate (Medieval Latin: carrūcāta or carūcāta) was a medieval unit of land area approximating the land a plough team of eight oxen could till in a single annual season. It was known by different regional names and fell under different forms of tax assessment.

== England ==
The carucate was named for the carruca heavy plough that began to appear in England in the late 9th century, which may have been introduced during the Viking invasions of England. It was also known as a ploughland or plough (Old English: plōgesland, "plough's land") in the Danelaw and usually, but not always, excluded the land's suitability for winter vegetables and desirability to remain fallow in crop rotation. The tax levied on each carucate came to be known as "carucage". Though a carucate might nominally be regarded as an area of 120 acres (49 hectares), and can usefully be equated to certain definitions of the hide, its variation over time and depending on soil and fertility makes its actual figure wildly variable. The Danelaw carucates were subdivided into eighths: oxgangs or bovates based on the area a yoked pair of oxen could till in a year. In the rest of England, the land was reckoned in hides which were divided into four yardlands, later known as virgates.

== Scotland ==
A ploughgate was the Scottish equivalent in the south and east of the country. Even more so than in England, the variable land quality in Scotland led to ploughgates of varying sizes, although the area was notionally understood as 100 Scots acres. Many sources say that four ploughgates made up a daugh; in other places, it appears to have been one daugh exactly. As in the Danelaw, ploughgates were subdivided into oxgangs, again usually by eighths.

== Wales ==
Cattle and oxen were a central part of the Laws of the ancient Celts, by the Welsh Middle Ages, oxen were an integral part of Welsh Law, and an important part of the legal valuations used in assessing land value, the wealth of personal holdings and determining compensations (such as the Galanas). Carucates are found throughout the Cyfraith Hywel (Law's of Hywel Dda).

In 1086, the Domesday Book records a number of entries for commotes in Wales. These commotes, (that had come under Anglo-Norman possession, but were still part of Welsh law and customs) were assessed for military service and taxation. Whereas the English possessions obligations were given in hides, the Welsh obligations were rated in carucates. This was also true for Archenfield in Herefordshire which may indicate the area maintained the Welsh systems.

== See also ==
- Aratrum terrae
- English units:
  - hide
  - virgate, nook, farundel
  - acre
- Scottish units in the East Highlands:
  - daugh
  - oxgang
  - Scots acre
  - Scots rood
- Scottish units in the West Highlands:
  - Scots markland
  - Ounceland
  - Quarterland
  - Pennyland
  - Groatland
