= Virgate =

Ancient unit of land

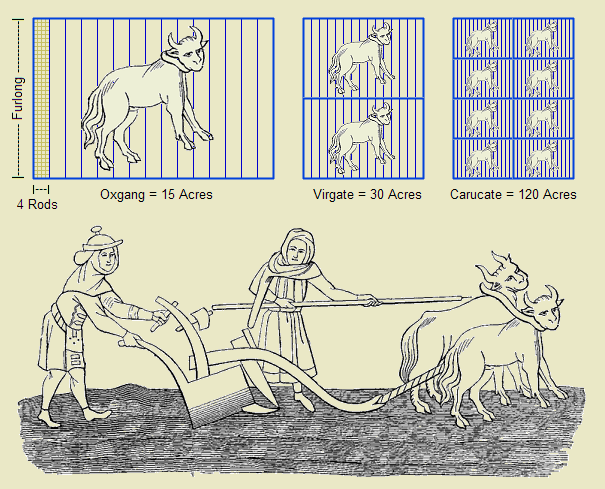
Farm-derived units of measurement: 1. The rod is a historical unit of length equal to 5 1/2 yards. It may have originated from the typical length of a mediaeval ox-goad. There are 4 rods in one chain.; 2. The furlong (meaning furrow length) was the distance a team of oxen could plough without resting. This was standardised to be exactly 40 rods or 10 chains.; 3. An acre was the amount of land tillable by one man behind one team of eight oxen in one day. Traditional acres were long and narrow due to the difficulty in turning the plough and the value of river front access.; 4. An oxgang was the amount of land tillable by one ox in a ploughing season. This could vary from village to village, but was typically around 15 acres.; 5. A virgate was the amount of land tillable by two oxen in a ploughing season.; 6. A carucate was the amount of land tillable by a team of eight oxen in a ploughing season. This was equal to 8 oxgangs or 4 virgates.

The virgate, yardland, or yard of land (Latin: virgāta [terrae]) was an English unit of land. Primarily a measure of tax assessment rather than area, the virgate was usually (but not always) reckoned as 1/4 hide and notionally (but seldom exactly) equal to 30 acres. It was equivalent to two of the Danelaw's oxgangs.

== Name ==
The name derives from the Old English gyrd landes ("yard of land"), from “yard's” former meaning as a measuring stick employed in reckoning acres (cf. rod). The word is etymologically unrelated to the yard of land around a dwelling. "Virgate" is a much later retronym, anglicizing the yardland's latinized form virgāta after the advent of the yard rendered the original name ambiguous.

== History ==
The virgate was reckoned as the amount of land that a team of two oxen could plough in a single annual season. It was equivalent to a quarter of a hide, so was nominally thirty acres. In some parts of England, it was divided into four nooks (Middle English: noke; Medieval Latin: noca). Nooks were occasionally further divided into a farundel (Middle English: ferthendel; Old English: fēorþan dǣl, "fourth deal, fourth share").

The Danelaw equivalent of a virgate was two oxgangs or ‘bovates’. These were considered to represent the amount of land that could be worked in a single annual season by a single ox and therefore equated to half a virgate. As such, the oxgang represented a parallel division of the carucate.
