= Aratrum terrae =

Legal term in Roman law

The term aratrum terræ, in ancient law books, meant as much land as can be tilled with one plough—Hoc manerium est 30 aratrorum.

Aratura terræ was an ancient service which the tenant was perform for his lord, by ploughing his land.

== See also ==
- Carucate
