= Acre =

Unit of area

acre
- The area of one acre (red) superposed on an American football field (green) and association football/soccer pitch (blue)

General information
- Unit system: US customary units, Imperial units
- Unit of: area
- Symbol: ac, acre

Conversions
| 1 ac in ... | ... is equal to ... |
- SI units: = 4,046.8564224 m^{2}
- US customary, Imperial: ≡ 4,840 yd^{2} ≡ 1/640 sq mi

The acre (/ˈeɪkər/ AY-kər) is a unit of land area used in the British imperial and the United States customary systems. It is traditionally defined as the area of one chain by one furlong (66 by 660 feet), which is exactly equal to 10 square chains, 1/640 of a square mile, 4,840 square yards, or 43,560 square feet, and approximately 4,047 m^{2}, or about 40% of a hectare. The acre is sometimes abbreviated ac, but is usually spelled out as the word "acre".

Traditionally, in the Middle Ages, an acre was conceived of as the area of land that could be ploughed by one man using a team of eight oxen in one day. The acre is still a statutory measure in the United States, where both the international acre and the US survey acre are in use, but they differ by only four parts per million. The most common use of the acre is to measure tracts of land. The acre is used in many existing and former Commonwealth of Nations countries by custom. In a few, it continues as a statute measure, although not since 2010 in the UK, and not for decades in Australia, New Zealand, and South Africa. In many places where the acre is no longer a statute measure, it is still lawful to use as supplementary information next to the statutory hectare measurement.

== Description ==
Comparison of 1 acre (highlighted as a yellow checkerboard pattern) with some Imperial and metric units of area

One acre equals 1/640 (0.0015625) square mile, 4,840 square yards, 43,560 square feet, or about 4,047 square metres (0.4047 hectares) (see below). While all modern variants of the acre contain 4,840 square yards, there are alternative definitions of a yard, so the exact size of an acre depends upon the particular yard on which it is based. Originally, an acre was understood as a strip of land sized at forty perches (660 ft, or 1 furlong) long and four perches (66 ft) wide; this may have also been understood as an approximation of the amount of land a yoke of oxen could plough in one day (a furlong being "a furrow long"). A square enclosing one acre is approximately 69.57 yards, or 208 feet 9 inches (63.61 metres), on a side. As a unit of measure, an acre has no prescribed shape; any area of 43,560 square feet is an acre.

== US survey acres ==
In the international yard and pound agreement of 1959, the United States and five countries of the Commonwealth of Nations defined the international yard to be exactly 0.9144 metre. The US authorities decided that, while the refined definition would apply nationally in all other respects, the US survey foot (and thus the survey acre) would continue 'until such a time as it becomes desirable and expedient to readjust [it]'. By inference, an "international acre" may be calculated as exactly 4,046.8564224 square metres but it does not have a basis in any international agreement.

Both the international acre and the US survey acre contain 1/640 of a square mile or 4,840 square yards, but alternative definitions of a yard are used (see Foot (unit) § Survey foot and Yard § Conversions), so the exact size of an acre depends upon the yard upon which it is based. The US survey acre is about 4,046.872 square metres; its exact value (4046 13,525,426/15,499,969 m^{2}) is based on an inch defined by 1 metre = 39.37 inches exactly, as established by the Mendenhall Order of 1893. Surveyors in the United States use both international and survey feet, and consequently, both varieties of acre.

Since the difference between the US survey acre and international acre (0.016 square metres, 160 square centimetres or 24.8 square inches), is only about a quarter of the size of an A4 sheet or US letter, it is usually not important which one is being discussed. Areas are seldom measured with sufficient accuracy for the different definitions to be detectable. In October 2019, the US National Geodetic Survey and the National Institute of Standards and Technology announced their joint intent to end the "temporary" continuance of the US survey foot, mile, and acre units (as permitted by their 1959 decision, above), with effect from the end of 2022.

=== Spanish acre ===
The Puerto Rican cuerda (0.39 ha; 0.97 acres) is sometimes called the "Spanish acre" in the continental United States.

== Use ==
The acre is commonly used in many current and former Commonwealth countries by custom, and in a few it continues as a statute measure. These include Antigua and Barbuda, American Samoa, The Bahamas, Belize, the British Virgin Islands, Canada, the Cayman Islands, Dominica, the Falkland Islands, Grenada, Ghana, Guam, the Northern Mariana Islands, Jamaica, Montserrat, Samoa, Saint Lucia, St. Helena, St. Kitts and Nevis, St. Vincent and the Grenadines, Turks and Caicos, the United Kingdom, the United States, and the US Virgin Islands.

=== Republic of Ireland ===
In the Republic of Ireland, the hectare is legally used under European units of measurement directives; however, the acre (the same standard statute as used in the UK, not the old Irish acre, which was of a different size) is still widely used, especially in agriculture.

=== Indian subcontinent ===
In India, residential plots are measured in square feet, square yard or square metre, while agricultural land is measured in bigha, acres or hectare. In Sri Lanka, the division of an acre into 160 perches or 4 roods is common.

In Pakistan, residential plots are measured in Kanal (20 marla = 1 kanal = 605 sq yards) and open/agriculture land measurement is in acres (8 kanal = 1 acre) and muraba (25 acres = 1 muraba = 200 kanal), jerib, wiswa and gunta.

=== United Kingdom ===
Its use as a primary unit for trade in the United Kingdom ceased to be permitted from 1 October 1995, due to the 1994 amendment of the Weights and Measures Act, where it was replaced by the hectare – though its use as a supplementary unit continues to be permitted indefinitely. This was with the exemption of land registration, which records the sale and possession of land; in 2010 HM Land Registry ended its exemption. The measure is still used to communicate with the public, and informally (non-contract) by the farming and property industries.

== Equivalence to other units of area ==
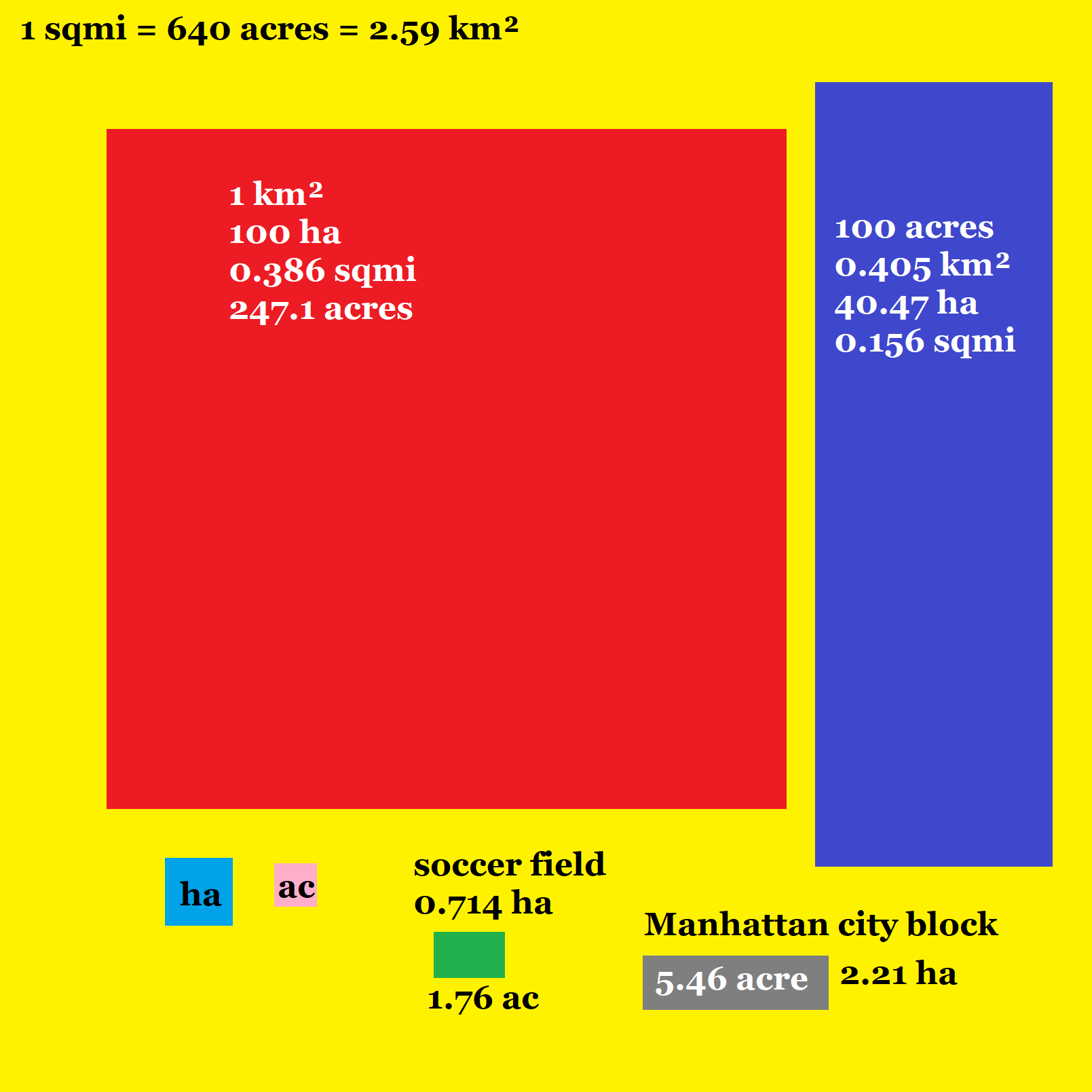
Image comparing the acre (the small pink area at lower left) to other units. The entire yellow square is one square mile; the dark blue area at right represents 100 acres.

1 international acre is equal to the following metric units:

- 0.40468564224 hectare (A square with 100 m sides has an area of 1 hectare.)
- 4,046.8564224 square metres (or a square with approximately 63.61 m sides)

1 United States survey acre is equal to:

- 0.404687261 hectare
- 4,046.87261 square metres (1 square kilometre is equal to 247.105 acres)

1 acre (both variants) is equal to the following customary units:

- 66 feet × 660 feet (43,560 square feet)
- 10 square chains (1 chain = 66 feet = 22 yards = 4 rods = 100 links)
- 1 acre is approximately 208.71 feet × 208.71 feet (a square)
- 4,840 square yards
- 43,560 square feet
- 160 perches. A perch is equal to a square rod (1 square rod is 0.00625 acre)
- 4 roods
- A furlong by a chain (furlong 220 yards, chain 22 yards)
- 40 rods by 4 rods, 160 rods^{2} (historically fencing was often sold in 40 rod lengths)
- 1/640 (0.0015625) square mile (1 square mile is equal to 640 acres)

Perhaps the easiest way for US residents to envision an acre is as a rectangle measuring 88 yards by 55 yards (1/10 of 880 yards by 1/16 of 880 yards), about 9/10 the size of a standard American football field. To be more exact, one acre is 90.75% of a 100-yd-long by 53.33-yd-wide American football field (without the end zone). The full field, including the end zones, covers about 1.32 acres (0.53 ha). For residents of other countries, the acre might be envisioned as rather more than half of a 1.76 acres (0.71 ha) football pitch.

== Historical origin ==
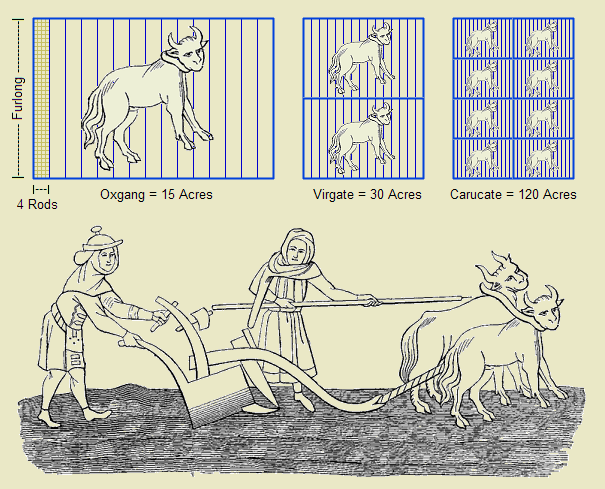
Farm-derived units of measurement: 1. The rod is a historical unit of length equal to 5 1/2 yards. It may have originated from the typical length of a mediaeval ox-goad. There are 4 rods in one chain.; 2. The furlong (meaning furrow length) was the distance a team of oxen could plough without resting. This was standardised to be exactly 40 rods or 10 chains.; 3. An acre was the amount of land tillable by one man behind a yoke of oxen in one day. Traditional acres were long and narrow due to the difficulty in turning the plough and the value of river front access.; 4. An oxgang was the amount of land tillable by one ox in a ploughing season. This could vary from village to village, but was typically around 15 acres.; 5. A virgate was the amount of land tillable by two oxen in a ploughing season.; 6. A carucate was the amount of land tillable by a team of eight oxen in a ploughing season. This was equal to 8 oxgangs or 4 virgates.

The word acre is derived from the Norman, attested for the first time in 1006 in a text from Fécamp with the meaning of "agrarian measure". Acre dates back to the old Scandinavian akr "cultivated field, ploughed land" which is perpetuated in Icelandic and the Faroese akur "field (wheat)", Norwegian and Swedish åker, Danish ager "field", cognate with German Acker, Dutch akker, Latin ager, Sanskrit ajr, and Greek αγρός (agros). In English, an obsolete variant spelling was aker. According to the Act on the Composition of Yards and Perches, dating from around 1300, an acre is "40 perches [rods] in length and four in breadth", meaning 220 yards by 22 yards. (Note: 22 yards is about 20 meters.) As detailed in the diagram, an acre was roughly the amount of land tillable by a yoke of oxen in one day.

Before the introduction of the metric system, many countries in Europe used their own official "acres" (with other names). In France, the traditional unit of area was the arpent carré, a measure based on the Roman system of land measurement. The acre was used only in Normandy (and neighbouring places outside its traditional borders), but its value varied greatly across Normandy, ranging from 3,632 to 9,725 square metres, with 8,172 square metres being the most frequent value. But inside the same pays of Normandy, for instance in pays de Caux, the farmers (still in the 20th century) made the difference between the grande acre (68 ares, 66 centiares) and the petite acre (56 to 65 ca). The Normandy acre was usually divided in 4 vergées (roods) and 160 square perches, like the English acre.

The Normandy acre was equal to 1.6 arpents, the unit of area more commonly used in Northern France outside of Normandy. In Canada, the Paris arpent used in Quebec before the metric system was adopted is sometimes called "French acre" in English, even though the Paris arpent and the Normandy acre were two very different units of area in ancient France (the Paris arpent became the unit of area of French Canada, whereas the Normandy acre was never used in French Canada).

In Germany, the Netherlands, and Eastern Europe the traditional unit of area was Morgen. Like the acre, the morgen was a unit of ploughland, representing a strip that could be ploughed by one man and an ox or horse in a morning. There were many variants of the morgen, differing between the different German territories, ranging from 1/2 to 2 1/2 acres (2,000 to 10,100 m^{2}). It was also used in Old Prussia, in the Balkans, Norway, and Denmark, where it was equal to about two-thirds acre (2,700 m^{2}). Statutory values for the acre were enacted in England, and subsequently the United Kingdom, by acts of:

- Edward I
- Edward III
- Henry VIII
- George IV
- Queen Victoria – the British Weights and Measures Act 1878 defined it as containing 4,840 square yards.

Historically, the size of farms and landed estates in the United Kingdom was usually expressed in acres (or acres, roods, and perches), even if the number of acres was so large that it might conveniently have been expressed in square miles. For example, a certain landowner might have been said to own 32,000 acres of land, not 50 square miles of land.

The acre is related to the square mile, with 640 acres making up one square mile. One mile is 5280 feet (1760 yards). In western Canada and the western United States, divisions of land area were typically based on the square mile, and fractions thereof. If the square mile is divided into quarters, each quarter has a side length of 1/2 mile (880 yards) and is 1/4 square mile in area, or 160 acres. These subunits are typically then again divided into quarters, with each side being 1/4 mile long, and being 1/16 of a square mile in area, or 40 acres. In the United States, farmland was typically divided as such, and the phrase "the back 40" refers to the 40-acre parcel to the back of the farm. Most of the Canadian Prairie Provinces and the US Midwest are on square-mile grids for surveying purposes.

== Legacy units ==
- Customary acre – The customary acre was roughly similar to the Imperial acre, but it was subject to considerable local variation similar to the variation in carucates, virgates, bovates, nooks, and farundels. These may have been multiples of the customary acre, rather than the statute acre.
- Builder's acre = 40,000 square feet (3,700 m^{2}) or 200 by 200 feet (61 m × 61 m), used in US real-estate development to simplify the math and for marketing. It is nearly 10% smaller than a survey acre, and the discrepancy has led to lawsuits alleging misrepresentation.
- Feddan – Middle Eastern measurement unit, 4,200 square metres (1.0378 acres).
- Scottish acre = 1.3 imperial acres (5,080 m^{2}, an obsolete Scottish measurement)
- Irish acre = 7,840 square yards (6,560 m^{2})
- Cheshire acre = 10,240 square yards (8,560 m^{2})
- Stremma or Greek acre ≈ 10,000 square Greek feet, but now set at exactly 1,000 square metres (a similar unit was the zeugarion)
- Dunam or Turkish acre ≈ 1,600 square Turkish paces, but now set at exactly 1,000 square metres (a similar unit was the çift)
- Actus quadratus or Roman acre ≈ 14,400 square Roman feet (about 1,260 square metres)
- Long acre – the grass strip on either side of a road that may be used for illicit grazing.
- Town acre was a term used in early 19th century in the planning of towns on a grid plan, such as Adelaide, South Australia and Wellington, New Plymouth and Nelson in New Zealand. The land was divided into plots of an Imperial acre, and these became known as town acres.

== See also ==
- Acre-foot – used in US to measure a large water volume
- Anthropic units
- Arpent – used in Louisiana to measure length and area
- Conversion of units
- God's Acre – a synonym for a churchyard
- Jugerum – Roman unit of area
- Morgen ("morning") – normally 2/3 of a Tagwerk ("day work") of ploughing with an ox
- Mu – Chinese acre
- Public Land Survey System
- Quarter acre
- Section (United States land surveying)
- Spanish units of measurement
