= Margaret McMurray =

Last native speaker of a Lowland dialect of Scottish Gaelic in the Galloway variety

Margaret McMurray (died 1760) appears to have been one of the last native speakers of a Lowland dialect of Scottish Gaelic in the Galloway variety.

In The Scotsman of 18 November 1951 appeared the following letter, which had originally been printed in the Daily Review in 1876:

Sir-I send this in corroboration of the fact that Gaelic was to some extent spoken in Ayrshire in the early part of last century. My grand-aunt, Jean McMurray, who died in 1836 at the age of 87, informed me that Margaret McMurray, the representative of the elder branch of the McMurrays of Cultezron, near Maybole, and who died at a very advanced age about the year 1760, was long talked about as having been the last Gaelic-speaking native of Carrick.

Cultezron is situated about 30 miles north of Glenapp, and seven or eight miles south of Ayr. Cultezron was possessed by several generations of McMurrays, and its name is purely Celtic Cul Tigh Eobhain, (sic) signifying the 'back of Ewan's house'.

-I am etc. D. Murray-Lyon Ayr, October 31, 1876

Cultezron (not to be confused with nearby Culzean) is a small farm on the outskirts of the town of Maybole in South Ayrshire. It appears that Margaret's family had been in possession of it for at least 150 years prior to this, as one 'John McMurray' is in legal records at that time. It is also notable that McMurray's descendants, dropped the 'Mc' from the name, suggesting anglicisation. Despite their similar appearance, the names 'McMurray' and 'Murray' come from separate origins, the former being related to the Murphys and Morrows in Ireland and the Murchisons in the Scottish Highlands, and the latter's origin being de Moray (of Moray).

The farm is now titled Cultezeon Farm, just west of Maybole.

The scholar William Laughton Lorimer discussed McMurray briefly in Scottish Gaelic studies.

== See also ==
- Galwegian Gaelic
