= Oxgang =

Old English and Scottish land area

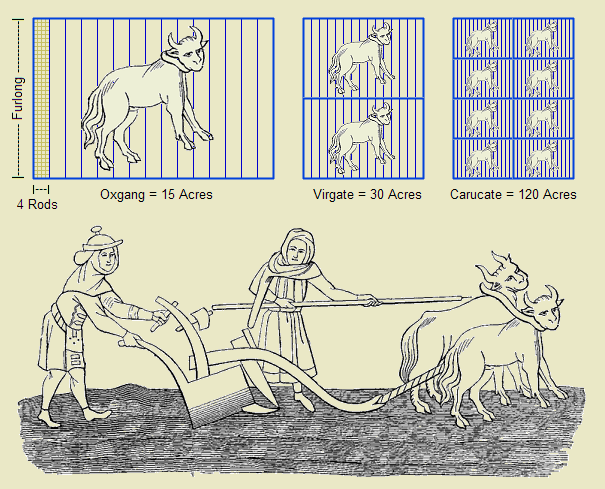
Farm-derived units of measurement: 1. The rod is a historical unit of length equal to 5 1/2 yards. It may have originated from the typical length of a mediaeval ox-goad. There are 4 rods in one chain.; 2. The furlong (meaning furrow length) was the distance a team of oxen could plough without resting. This was standardised to be exactly 40 rods or 10 chains.; 3. An acre was the amount of land tillable by one man behind one team of eight oxen in one day. Traditional acres were long and narrow due to the difficulty in turning the plough and the value of river front access.; 4. An oxgang was the amount of land tillable by one ox in a ploughing season. This could vary from village to village, but was typically around 15 acres.; 5. A virgate was the amount of land tillable by two oxen in a ploughing season.; 6. A carucate was the amount of land tillable by a team of eight oxen in a ploughing season. This was equal to 8 oxgangs or 4 virgates.

An oxgang or bovate (Old English: oxangang; Danish: oxgang; Scottish Gaelic: damh-imir; Medieval Latin: bovāta) is an old land measurement formerly used in Scotland and England as early as the 16th century sometimes referred to as an oxgait. It averaged around 20 English acres (eight hectares), but was based on land fertility and cultivation, and so could be as little as 15 acres (6 hectares).

An oxgang is also known as a bovate, from bovāta, a Medieval Latinisation of the word, derived from the Latin bōs, meaning "ox, bullock or cow". Oxen, through the Scottish Gaelic word damh or dabh, also provided the root of the land measurement 'daugh'.

Skene in Celtic Scotland says:

"in the eastern district there is a uniform system of land denomination consisting of 'dabhachs', 'ploughgates' and 'oxgangs', each 'dabhach' consisting of four 'ploughgates' and each 'ploughgate' containing eight 'oxgangs'.

"As soon as we cross the great chain of mountains [the Grampian Mountains] separating the eastern from the western waters, we find a different system equally uniform. The 'ploughgates' and 'oxgangs' disappear, and in their place we find 'dabhachs' and 'pennylands'. The portion of land termed a 'dabhach' is here also called a 'tirung' or 'ounceland', and each 'dabhach' contains 20 pennylands."

In Scotland, oxgang occurs in Oxgangs, a southern suburb of Edinburgh, and in Oxgang, an area of the town of Kirkintilloch.

== Usage in England ==
In England, the oxgang was a unit typically used in the area conquered by the Vikings which became the Danelaw, for example in the Domesday Book, where it is found as a bovata, or 'bovate'. The oxgang represented the amount of land which could be ploughed using one ox in a single annual season. As land was normally ploughed by a team of eight oxen, an oxgang was thus one eighth the size of a ploughland or carucate. Although these areas were not fixed in size and varied from one village to another, an oxgang averaged 15 acres (6 hectares), and a ploughland or carucate 100–120 acres (40–49 ha). However, in the rest of England a parallel system was used, from which the Danelaw system of carucates and bovates seen in the Domesday Book was derived. There, the virgate represented land which could be ploughed by a pair of oxen, and so amounted to two oxgangs or bovates, and was a quarter of a hide, the hide and the carucate being effectively synonymous.

A peasant occupying or working an oxgang or bovate might be known as a "bovater" or "oxganger".

== See also ==
- Obsolete Scottish units of measurement
  - In the East of Scotland:
    - Rood
    - Scottish acre = 4 roods
    - Oxgang (Damh-imir) = the area an ox could plough in a single annual season (around 20 acres)
    - Ploughgate (?) = 8 oxgangs
    - Daugh (Dabhach) = 4 ploughgates
  - In the West of Scotland:
    - Pennyland (Peighinn) = basic unit also broken into halfpennyland and farthingland.
    - Groatland - (Còta bàn) = ie 4 pennies;
    - Quarterland (Ceathramh) = 8 pennylands (quarter of a mark);
    - Ounceland (Tir-unga) = 4 quarterlands (32 pennies);
    - Markland (Marg-fhearann) = 8 Ouncelands (varied);
