= Scottish acre =

A Scottish or Scots acre (Scottish Gaelic: acair) was a land measurement used in Scotland. It was standardised in 1661. When the Weights and Measures Act 1824 was implemented the English System was standardised into the Imperial System and Imperial acres were imposed throughout the United Kingdom, including in Scotland and indeed throughout the British Empire from that point on. However, since then the metric system has come to be used in Scotland, as in the rest of the United Kingdom..

Equivalent to:

- Metric system
  - 5,080 square metres, 0.508 hectares
- Imperial system
  - 54,760 square feet. This is approximately 1.257 acres (English).

== See also ==
- Acre
- Obsolete Scottish units of measurement
  - In the East Highlands:
    - Rood
    - Scottish acre = 4 roods
    - Oxgang (Damh-imir) = the area an ox could plough in a year (around 20 acres)
    - Ploughgate (?) = 8 oxgangs
    - Daugh (Dabhach) = 4 ploughgates
  - In the West Highlands:
    - Groatland - (Còta bàn) = basic unit
    - Pennyland (Peighinn) = 2 groatlands
    - Quarterland (Ceathramh) = 4 pennylands (8 groatlands)
    - Ounceland (Tir-unga) = 4 quarterlands (32 groatlands)
    - Markland (Marg-fhearann) = 8 Ouncelands (varied)
