= Quarterland =

Scottish land measurement

A Quarterland or Ceathramh (Scottish Gaelic) was a Scottish land measurement. It was used mainly in the west and north.

It was supposed to be equivalent to eight fourpennylands, roughly equivalent to a quarter of a markland. However, in Islay, a quarterland was equivalent to a quarter of an ounceland. Half of a quarterland would be an ochdamh(ie.one-eighth), and in Islay a quarter of a quarterland a leothras(ie.one-sixteenth).

The name appears in many Scottish placenames, notably Kirriemuir.

- Kerrowaird – Ceathramh àrd (High Quarterland)
- Kerrowgair – Ceathramh geàrr (Rough Quarterland)
- Kerry (Cowal) - An Ceathramh Còmh’lach (The Cowal Quarterland)
- Kerrycroy - An Ceathramh cruaidh (The Hard Quarterland)
- Kirriemuir – An Ceathramh Mòr/Ceathramh Mhoire (either "The Big Quarterland" or "Mary's Quarterland")

Ceathramh was also used in Gàidhlig for a bushel and a firlot (or four pecks), as was Feòirling, the term used for a farthlingland.

== Isle of Man ==
The Isle of Man retained a similar system into historic times: in the traditional land divisions of treens (cf. the Scottish Gaelic word trian, a third part) which are in turn subdivided into smaller units called quarterlands.

== See also ==
- Obsolete Scottish units of measurement
  - In the East Highlands:
    - Rood
    - Scottish acre = 4 roods
    - Oxgang (Damh-imir) = the area an ox could plow in a year (around 20 acres)
    - Ploughgate (?) = 8 oxgangs
    - Daugh (Dabhach) = 4 ploughgates
  - In the West Highlands:
    - Markland (Marg-fhearann) = 8 Ouncelands (varied)
    - Ounceland (Tir-unga) =20 Pennylands
    - Pennyland (Peighinn) = basic unit; sub-divided into half penny-land and farthing-land
    - (Other terms in use; Quarterland (Ceathramh): variable value; Groatland (Còta bàn)
- Townland
- Township (Scotland)
