= Prairie strips =

Conservation practice

Prairie strips are strips of native perennial vegetation that are strategically integrated into row crop fields. This technique is used in conservation farming to improve biodiversity, and protect soil and water.

Native prairie vegetation improves soil stability, reduces soil erosion and nutrient runoff, and concentrates more organic carbon in soil than corn and soybean crops. Research has found that strategically setting aside land in corn and soybean fields benefits biodiversity, water and soil in a greater extent than other types of perennial vegetation. 10% of a corn field set aside for native vegetation can reduce sediment movement by 95%. Phosphorus and nitrogen lost through run off are reduced by 90% and 85% respectively. Farmers can take odd areas or difficult-to-farm areas out of production as they integrate native plant species into farm fields as contour buffers and edge-of-field filters.

In Iowa, most of the rich and fertile soils have been dedicated to corn and soybean crops. Only around 0.1 percent of the original tallgrass prairie remains. Prairie strips are among the few remaining areas for the native vegetation.

Entomologists at Iowa State University observed beneficial aphid-eating insects in soybean fields and the prairie strips. They found that prairie strips supported twice the number of aphid-eating insects than soybean fields.
