= Ounceland =

Traditional Scottish land measurement

An ounceland (Scottish Gaelic: unga) is a traditional Scottish land measurement. It was found in the West Highlands, and Hebrides. In Eastern Scotland, other measuring systems were used instead. It was equivalent to 20 pennylands or one eighth of a markland. Like those measurements, it is based on the rent paid, rather than the actual land area. It was also known as a "tirung" (from Scottish Gaelic: tìr-unga), or a dabhach (same as daugh), which is a term of Pictish origin, also used in the east of Scotland too, but for a different measurement. The “ounceland” is thought to be of Norse origin, so it is possible that Norse (‘ounceland’) and native systems (dabhach) were conflated in the west.

== Quotes ==
Skene in Celtic Scotland says:

"As soon as we cross the great chain of mountains separating the eastern from the western waters, we find a different system equally uniform. The ‘ploughgates’ and ‘oxgangs’ disappear, and in their place we find ‘dabhachs’ and ‘pennylands’. The portion of land termed a ‘dabhach’ is here also called a ‘tirung’ or ‘ounceland’, and each ‘dabhach’ contains 20 pennylands."

The Rev. Dr Campbell of Broadford on the island of Skye said:

"the system of land measure which prevailed in the Western Isles, and then took root in Argyll was neither Pictish nor Irish, but Norse. The unit was the 'ounce'-land, i.e. the extent of land which paid the rent of an ounce of silver. The word was borrowed by Gaelic and appears as 'unnsa'. The land term was 'unga', e.g. Unganab in North Uist and in Tiree. It appears in the old charters as 'teroung', 'teiroung', &c. This extent was divided into twenty parts—sometimes into only 18 – which parts being called 'peighinn'…"

== Other uses ==
The term unga/uinge is also used for an ingot.

== See also ==
- Obsolete Scottish units of measurement
  - In the East Highlands:
    - Rood
    - Scottish acre = 4 roods
    - Oxgang (Damh-imir) = the area an ox could plow in a year (around 20 acres)
    - Ploughgate (?) = 8 oxgangs
    - Daugh (Dabhach) = 4 ploughgates
  - In the West Highlands:
    - Markland (Marg-fhearann) = 8 Ouncelands (varied)
    - Ounceland (Tir-unga) =20 Pennylands
    - Pennyland (Peighinn) = basic unit; sub-divided into half penny-land and farthing-land
    - (Other terms in use; Quarterland (Ceathramh): variable value; Groatland (Còta bàn)
- Townland (Baile)
