= Davoch =

Ancient Scottish land measurement

The davoch, davach or daugh is an ancient Scottish land measurement. All of these terms are cognate with modern Scottish Gaelic dabhach. The word dabh or damh means an "ox" (cf. oxgang, damh-imir), but dabhach can also refer to a "tub", so may indicate productivity. It was called the arachor in the Lennox.

It is thought that the measurement is of Pictish origins, and is most common in the north east, and often absent in the south of Scotland. It is particularly common in various placenames to this day, often in the form "Daugh of Invermarkie" etc. The name "Haddo" is also a corruption of “Hauf Daugh”, or half-davoch, in turn a translation of “leth-dhabhach”.

Scottish land measurements tended to be based on how much livestock they could support. This was particularly important in a country where fertility would vary widely. In the east a davoch would be a portion of land that could support 60 cattle or oxen. MacBain reckoned the davoch to be “either one or four ploughgates, according to locality and land”. A ploughgate contains about 100 Scots acres (5.3 km^{2}).

Watson, in The Placenames of Ross & Cromarty, says, “usually four ploughgates”. Skene in Celtic Scotland says:

“in the eastern district there is a uniform system of land denomination consisting of ‘dabhachs’, ‘ploughgates’ and ‘oxgangs’, each ‘dabhach’ consisting of four ‘ploughgates’ and each ‘ploughgate’ containing eight ‘oxgangs’.

“As soon as we cross the great chain of mountains separating the eastern from the western waters, we find a different system equally uniform. The ‘ploughgates’ and ‘oxgangs’ disappear, and in their place we find dabhachs and ‘pennylands’. The portion of land termed a ‘dabhach’ is here also called a tirung or 'ounceland', and each ‘dabhach’ contains 20 pennylands.”

The pennyland is thought to be of Norse origin, so it is possible that Norse and native systems were conflated in the west.

Prof. MacKinnon in Place and Personal Names of Argyll says,

“In Pictland the unit of land measure was the ‘dabhach’, a unit which properly denotes a liquid measure. An old farmer in Western Gaeldom frequently speaks of his fields, not as containing so many acres of land, but as ‘the sowing of so many bolls of oats’, ‘the bed of so many barrels of potatoes’ &c. Accordingly, from a measure of capacity, ‘dabhach’ came early to be used as a measure of land surface. In Gaeldom, where arable land is scant and scattered, the variations in the acreage, of particular ‘dabhachs’ or ‘ounces’ must have been very great, still the extent of land represented by these terms seems to have been, as a rule, about 104 Scots acres, or 120 English acres [0.547 km^{2}]”.

The lexicographer Jamieson claimed that a daugh was enough to produce about 48 bolls, and averaged an area of approximately 1 1/2 square miles (3.9 km^{2}).

Daughs are referred to in the Book of Deer, and were recorded as being in use in the late 18th century in Inverness-shire. In some areas, a quarter of a davoch was a ploughgate, and an eighth an ochdamh.

== See also ==
- Acre
- Obsolete Scottish units of measurement
  - In the East Highlands:
    - Rood
    - Scottish acre = 4 roods
    - Oxgang (Damh-imir) = the area an ox could plow in a year (around 20 acres)
    - Ploughgate (?) = 8 oxgangs
    - Daugh (Dabhach) = 4 ploughgates
  - In the West Highlands:
    - Groatland - (Còta bàn) = basic unit
    - Pennyland (Peighinn) = 2 groatlands
    - Quarterland (Ceathramh) = 4 pennylands (8 groatlands)
    - Ounceland (Tir-unga) = 4 quarterlands (32 groatlands)
    - Markland (Marg-fhearann) = 8 ouncelands (varied)
- Townland (Baile)
- Feddan - an Arabic land measurement following a similar line of thinking.
