= Markland (Scots) =

A markland or merkland (Scottish Gaelic: Marg-fhearainn) is an old Scottish unit of land measurement.

There was some local variation in the equivalences; for example, in some places eight ouncelands were equal to one markland, but in others, such as Islay, a markland was twelve ouncelands. The markland derived its name from the old coin, the Merk Scots (cognate with German mark and various other European coinages, see Mark (money)), which was the annual rent paid on it. It was based on this, rather than its actual area. Originally a Scots mark or merk was 13s 4d (160 pence), but the Scottish coinage depreciated against the English, and by the 18th century a Scots merk was worth only 13^{1}/_{3}d sterling – one-twelfth of its original value. Although such coins were abolished by the Acts of Union 1707, some stayed in circulation for decades, and the names themselves remained in common use for centuries.

== See also ==
- Obsolete Scottish units of measurement
  - In the East Highlands:
    - Rood
    - Scottish acre = 4 roods
    - Oxgang (Damh-imir) = the area an ox could plough in a year (around 20 acres)
    - Ploughgate (?) = 8 oxgangs
    - Daugh (Dabhach) = 4 ploughgates
  - In the West Highlands:
    - Markland (Marg-fhearann) = 8 Ouncelands (varied)
    - Ounceland (Tir-unga) =20 Pennylands
    - Pennyland (Peighinn) = basic unit; sub-divided into half penny-land and farthing-land
    - (Other terms in use; Quarterland (Ceathramh): variable value; Groatland (Còta bàn)
