= South African units of measurement =

A number of units of measurement were used in South Africa to measure quantities like length, mass, capacity, etc. The Imperial system of measurements was made standard in 1922 and the metric system was adopted in 1961.

== System before metric system ==
British and old Dutch systems were used.

=== Length ===
The Rhynland rood (Rijnlandse roede) was a standard Dutch measurement. It was changed in 1859 to the "Cape Foot" due to a drift in standards.

1 Rhynland foot (Rijnlandse voet) = 12 Rhynland inches (Rijnlandse duim) = 1.030 English feet.
1 Rhynland rood = 12 Rhynland feet = 12.36 (≈12.4) English feet.
1 Cape foot = 1.033 English feet.
1 Cape rood = 12 Cape feet = 12.394 (≈12.4) English feet.
1 elle = 27 Rhynland inches = 2.25 Rhynland feet [0.685 m].
1 English yard = 34.85 (≈35) Rhynland inches = 2.916̅ Rhynland feet

=== Mass ===
32 loot = 16 ons ("Dutch ounce") = 1 pond ("Dutch pound").
1 Dutch pound = 1.08932 (≈1.09) English Avoirdupois pounds. [0.494 kg.]
1 English Avoirdupois pound [0.453 kg.] = 0.918 (≈0.92) Dutch pounds.
1 Cape Hundredweight (cwt.) = 100 English Avoirdupois pounds.
20 Cape Hundredweights (20 × 100 lb) = 1 Cape Ton (2,000 lb)
1 Bundle =0.699 lbs [0.3175 kg]

=== Area ===
One morgen was equal to 8565.32 m^{2}.

=== Capacity ===
Several units were used. Some units are provided below:

==== Dry measures ====
These were used to measure rice and salt.

1 gantang [9.2 L, 2.02 Imp. gal.]: Derived from a Malaysian dry measure used on Java, Borneo, and the Moluccas and Celebes Islands.
1 balli = 5 gantang [46 L, 11 Imp. gal.]: Derived from an Indonesian dry measure used on Sumatra.

==== Corn measures ====
These were used to measure grains.

1 schepel [27.275 L, 5.999 (≈6) Imp. gal., 0.749 (≈0.75) Imp. bushels.] Derived from an old Dutch word for a measuring spade or scoop used to portion out seeds or grain. It fell out of favor by the end of the 19th century.
1 muid (sack) = 4 schepels [109.1 L, 23.998 (≈24) Imp. gal., 2.99 (≈3) Imp. bushels] Derived from a medieval French word for a dry measure of seeds large enough to plant a set area of land.
1 quarter [290.95 (≈291) l, 64 Imp. gal., 8 Imp. bushels] ≈ 11 schepels [300.025 L, 65.99 (≈66) Imperial gal., 8.249 (≈8.25) Imp. bushels]: A standard measurement of grain equal to a quarter of a short ton [500 English lbs., 227 kg] in weight.
1 load = 10 muids = 40 schepels [1091 L, 29.98 (≈30) Imp. bushels]

==== Liquid measures ====
The country didn't have a unified system of liquid measurement in the 19th century because the Afrikaners used the Dutch gallon [3.3947 (≈3.4)? liters] and the British used the Imperial gallon [4.54 liters]. When measuring alcohol, the British system was used only for ale and beer and the Dutch system was used only for wine, brandy and distilled spirits. This was due to specialization in the two colonies, which were not united until 1910. Vintning was more common among the Afrikaner farmers of the Western Cape, who dominated the industry. Meanwhile, the British farmers grew grain that could be brewed into beer. Wine was for export and beer, which was perishable, was for domestic consumption. Each community used their own standard measurement systems to store, sell and ship their wares.

===== Ale and beer =====
The firkin, kilderkin, barrel, hogshead, and butt were traditional British measurements of capacity for standard ale and beer containers. They were based on the British ale gallon. (Once there were different measures for ale and beer before the Ale gallon measure became standard for both in 1688; the Ale gallon then became the Imperial gallon in 1824).

1 firkin [9 Imp. gal.]: A Dutch word meaning "little Fourth"; a measure that was a fourth of a barrel. A small cask similar to the anker.
1 kilderkin = 2 firkins [18 Imp. gal.]: A Dutch word meaning "little quintal"; a measure that was a half of a barrel.
1 barrel = 4 firkins = 2 kilderkins [36 Imp. gal.]
1 hogshead = 6 firkins = 3 kilderkins [54 Imp. gal.]:
1 butt = 12 firkins = 6 kilderkins = 3 barrels = 2 hogsheads [108 Imp. gal.]

{Beer bottles in South Africa were different from in other countries.}

Dumpie [340 ml, 11.98 Imp. fl. oz.]: A short-necked recyclable beer-bottle with a rounded body; the word is a nickname for a person who is short and fat. It used to be 12 Imperial ounces [341 ml] (3/5 of an Imperial pint), like the Canadian "stumpy" beer bottles. It was rounded down to 340 ml when South Africa converted to the metric system in 1970. The 340 ml capacity also became the standard volume for beer and soda cans until 2007, when the bottling plants converted to the 330 ml European standard. It has since been replaced by long-necked 330 ml beer bottles.
"Quart" [750 ml, 0.659 (≈0.66) Imp. fl. qt.]: The standard 750 ml wine bottle (about 2/3 of an Imperial quart) was also used for beer until 2008. Wine bottles were more fragile than the heavier Dumpies, making them harder to recycle. Under the South African Breweries (SAB) Project Calabash initiative in 2008 a new 750 ml bottle that was longer lasting and easier to recycle was introduced. It has a cylindrical body with a necked-down conical neck, resembling a scaled-up Pilsner beer pint bottle.

===== Wine =====
The Dutch East India Company used the Cape of Good Hope as a waystation between Europe and the East Indies in the 17th and 18th centuries. Dutch sailors drank the local wine to combat scurvy and exported barrels of it back to Europe. This was followed by the British government's policy of encouraging the wine and brandy industry in South Africa in the early- to mid-19th century through subsidies and low tariffs. (Their recent isolation during Napoleon's Continental System impressed upon them that they would potentially need alternative sources of European commodities in the future.)

The kanne, anker, ahm, and legger are obsolete 17th century Dutch measurements of capacity that were used for standard containers of wine and spirits. The standard "Dutch gallon" used was based on that of Amsterdam. They were typically sold in ankers, half-aums, and leggers until 1922, when the Imperial measurement system went into effect.

1 kanne (can) = 1/388 legger [11/32 (≈0.343) Dutch gallons, 1.329 Liters, 1.17 Imp. qts.] A Dutch and German term for a measure of alcohol that was enough to fill a standard wine flagon (flapkan). The term kanne was also used for different-sized measures of beer, milk or whale oil that varied from region to region.
1 flask = [19/32 (≈0.6) Dutch gallons, 2.248 Liters, 1.978 (≈2) Imp. qts.] A term for a measure of alcohol that was enough to fill a large wine bottle. South Africa eventually adopted the standard French 750-ml bottle.
1 half-anker = 12.125 (≈12) kannen, 1/8 ahm = 1/32 legger [4.75 Dutch gallons, 16.125 Liters, 3.958 (≈4) Imp. gals.]
1 anker = 24.25 (≈24) kannen, 1/4 ahm = 1/16 legger [9.5 Dutch gallons, 32.25 Liters, 7.9143 (≈8) Imp. gals.] A Dutch term for a small wine or brandy cask.
1 half-aum = 48.5 (≈48) kannen, 2 anker = 1/8 legger [19 Dutch gallons, 64.5 Liters, 15.8286 (≈16) Imp. gals.] A measure roughly equivalent to a British rundlet [68.19 (≈68) liters, 15 Imperial gallons].
1 ahm (aum) = 97 kannen = 4 anker = 1/4 legger. [38 Dutch gallons, 129 Liters, 31.6572 (≈32) Imp. gals.] An ahm (anglicised as "aum" – using the French spelling) was a Dutch and German measure of wine that was a fourth of a legger. It was also roughly equivalent to a British tierce [159.1 (≈159) liters, 35 Imp. gals.], a measure equal to a third of a butt.
1 half-pipe [55 Dutch gallons, 208.29 Liters, 45.8̅1̅ (≈46) Imp. gals.]
1 pipe [110 Dutch gallons, 416.58 Liters, 91.6̅3̅ (≈92) Imp. gals.]: A wine cask based on the Spanish pipa of Cadiz that was introduced to Britain via the garrison of Gibraltar. The British adopted several different sized 'pipes' that varied in capacity depending on the contents (like hard cider, brandy, wine, or fortified wine). The South African wine 'pipe' was based on the Madeira 'pipe' of 92 Imperial gallons.
1 half-leaguer = 194 kannen = 8 anker = 2 ahm [76 Dutch gallons, 287.849 (≈288) liters, 63.318 (≈64) Imp. gals.] A measure roughly equivalent to a British hogshead.
1 legger (leaguer) = 388 kannen = 16 anker = 4 ahm [152 Dutch gallons, 575.67 (≈576) liters, 126.6̅3̅ (≈127) Imp. gals.] A legger (anglicised as "leaguer") was a Dutch term for a large barrel of wine, roughly equivalent to a British butt [477.3 (≈477) liters, 105 Imperial gallons].

===== Gasoline =====
Gasoline was formerly sold in Imperial gallons [1 Imp. gal. = 4.546 L], but was switched to litres after the adoption of the metric system between 1971 and 1973.
