= Pennyland =

Scottish land measurement

A pennyland (Scottish Gaelic: peighinn) is an old Scottish land measurement. It was found in the West Highlands, and also Galloway, and believed to be of Norse origin. It is frequently found in minor placenames.

Skene in Celtic Scotland says:

"in the eastern district there is a uniform system of land denomination consisting of 'dabhachs', 'ploughgates' and 'oxgangs', each 'dabhach' consisting of four 'ploughgates' and each 'ploughgate' containing eight 'oxgangs'.

"As soon as we cross the great chain of mountains separating the eastern from the western waters, we find a different system equally uniform. The 'ploughgates' and 'oxgangs' disappear, and in their place we find 'dabhachs' and 'pennylands'. The portion of land termed a 'dabhach' is here also called a 'tirung' or 'ounceland', and each 'dabhach' contains 20 pennylands."

The Rev. Dr Campbell of Broadford on Skye says:

"the system of land measure which prevailed in the Western Isles, and then took root in Argyll was neither Pictish nor Irish, but Norse. The unit was the ‘ounce-’land, i.e. the extent of land which paid the rent of an ounce of silver. The word was borrowed by Gaelic and appears as ‘unnsa’. The land term was ‘unga’, e.g. Unganab in North Uist and in Tiree. It appears in the old charters as ‘teroung’, ‘teiroung’, &c. This extent was divided into twenty parts—sometimes into only 18 – which parts being called ‘peighinn’; hence many placenames, e.g. Pennymore, Peighinnchornach. In some places the pennyland was subdivided. On Loch Fyneside we meet with Lephinmore, Lephincorrach, (‘the big half-pennyland’, the ‘rough half pennyland’); also ‘an Fheòirling’ (the ‘farthingland’). A conventional use of the term ‘peighinn’ is met with in Skye—the crofting town of Elgol is separated by a march-dyke from the deer forest; each crofter is responsible for the upkeep of a specified length of the dyke, and it is called the ‘peighinn’ of his croft; similarly the part of the shore allotted to each croft for seaware is called the ‘peighinn’ of that croft."

It should not be confused with pen which is a Brythonic language element in placenames such as Penicuik, in Midlothian.

== See also ==
- Obsolete Scottish units of measurement
  - In the East Highlands:
    - Rood
    - Scottish acre = 4 roods
    - Oxgang (Damh-imir) = the area an ox could plow in a year (around 20 acres)
    - Ploughgate (?) = 8 oxgangs
    - Daugh (Dabhach) = 4 ploughgates
  - In the West Highlands:
    - Markland (Marg-fhearann) = 8 Ouncelands (varied)
    - Ounceland (Tir-unga) =20 Pennylands
    - Pennyland (Peighinn) = basic unit; sub-divided into half penny-land and farthing-land
    - (Other terms in use; Quarterland (Ceathramh): variable value; Groatland (Còta bàn)
- Penny Scots
- Pennyland project (low-energy buildings at Milton Keynes)
