= Strip farming =

Method of partitioning farming fields

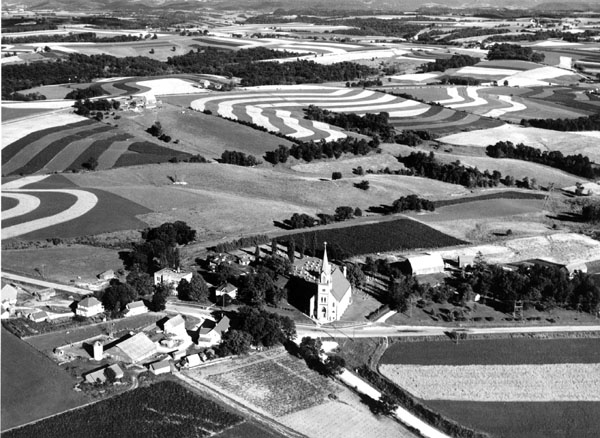
Strip farming in Wisconsin, 1957

Strip cropping is a method of farming which involves cultivating a field partitioned into long, narrow strips which are alternated in a crop rotation system. It is used when a slope is too steep or when there is no alternative method of preventing soil erosion. The most common crop choices for strip cropping are closely sown crops such as hay, wheat, or other forages which are alternated with strips of row crops, such as corn, soybeans, cotton, or sugar beets. The forages serve primarily as cover crops. In certain systems, strips in particularly-eroded areas are used to grow permanent protective vegetation, but in most systems, all strips are alternated on an annual basis.

== Dimensions ==
The width of strips is determined by a number of factors, with the two most important being the average wind velocity in a specific site and the features of the slope, particularly the gradient. Each strip typically ranges from 25 feet (7.6 m) to 75 feet (23 m) in width, but certain conditions may necessitate widths outside of this range. A minimum width of 50 feet (15 m) is ideal for the use of most farm equipment.

== Use in conservation ==
The growing of a cultivated crop (as corn) in strips alternating with strips of a sod-forming crop (as hay) is arranged to follow an approximate contour of the land and minimize erosion. Saffron can also be planted with strip farming.

Strip cropping helps to stop soil erosion by creating natural dams for water and preserving the strength of the soil. Certain layers of plants will absorb minerals and water from the soil more effectively than others. When water reaches the weaker soil that lacks the minerals needed to make it stronger, it normally washes it away. When strips of soil are strong enough to slow down water from moving through them, the weaker soil cannot wash away as it normally would. Because of this, farmland stays fertile much longer.

The term strip cropping also refers to a method of dry farming sometimes used in areas including parts of the Great Plains of the United States and the Prairies of Canada. To accumulate moisture in those dry areas, cropland is periodically left fallow. Typically, the fallow and planted areas are organized in parallel long, narrow strips that are oriented normal to the prevailing winds to minimize the erosion of soil from the bare fields.

Strip farming helps to prevent mass erosion by having the roots of crops hold on to the soil to prevent it from being washed away.

In the Midwestern United States, prairie strips integrate "native plant species into farm fields as contour buffers and edge-of-field filters." Prairie strips attract pollinators, build soil health, help prevent erosion, and provide wildlife habitat.

== Types ==
=== Strip intercropping ===
Intercropping is the practice of growing two or more crops in the same field. The field is still divided into strips, but the strips are narrower and contiguous, which helps facilitate modern farm machinery as well as allows adjoining plants to benefit from synergistic growth effects.

=== Contour strip cropping ===
Contour strip cropping employs a crop rotation system down a slope to minimize runoff and rain velocity. It is used mainly on gentle slope gradients. The width of protective strips is often higher than that of the row crop strips, so they may effectively intercept runoff.
