= Ribbon farm =

Long, narrow land divisions for farming

Ribbon farms (also known as strip farms, (Note: A long narrow strip farm is not to be confused with strip cropping (a.k.a. strip farming), which is a method of cultivating a particular field located on a steep slope, which is partitioned into long, narrow strips of alternate crops to prevent soil erosion) river lots, long-lot farms, or just long lots) are long, narrow land divisions for farming, usually lined up along a waterway. In some instances, they line a road.

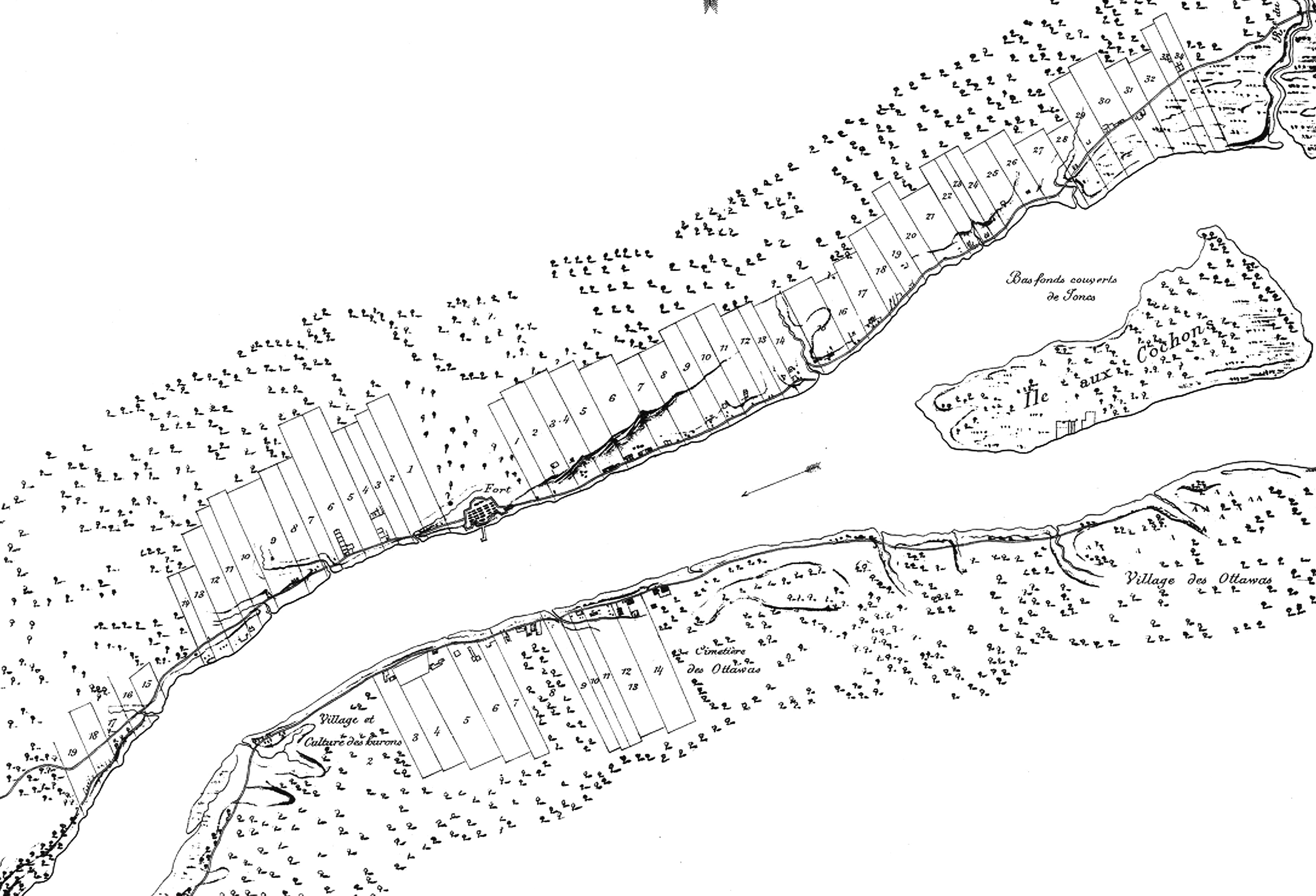
Ribbon farms along the Detroit River in 1796, where modern Detroit and Windsor, Ontario, now stand. Fort Detroit is on the north side of the river at center left, and Belle Isle is to the right.

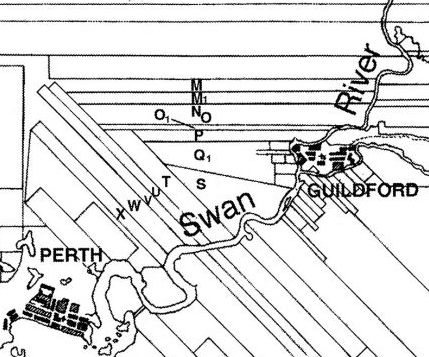
Ribbon grants along the Swan River of Western Australia between Perth and Guildford

== Background ==
Ribbon or strip farms were prevalent in diverse areas of the world along rivers; locations where these farms appear include in parts of Ireland, Central Europe (particularly in Germany and Poland), West Africa, Hokkaido, Brazil, and Chile. In the United States and Canada, ribbon farms are found in various places settled by the French, particularly along the Saint Lawrence River, the Great Lakes, and the Detroit River and tributaries, and parts of Louisiana. Some sections of the American Southwest, particularly Texas, also had ribbon farms laid out. Typical Polish examples are Zawoja and Sułoszowa, which extend over a length of 18 and 9 km respectively.

It is likely that platting farms in ribbon lots arose independently in various parts of the world. However, the ribbon farms scattered through the United States probably derive from the European model. The origin of the ribbon farm in Europe is unclear, but the first recorded appearance of these types of farms was in Germany in the ninth to eleventh century. These early German long lots were cut through forests or marshes, rather than along rivers, allowing for clustering of houses along a central road. From Germany, the pattern spread, notably to western France, where forest, marsh, and river long lots were well-established by the time the French began colonizing the Americas. By the 1630s, the long-lot pattern had been imported to the New World and established along the Saint Lawrence River as the French seigneurial system. From there, the ribbon farm plan situated along rivers was carried to other parts of the French colonies, and diffused into some parts of the Spanish colonies.

== Description ==
The size of ribbon farms can vary from lot to lot and from place to place. In Illinois, these lots could be 1/4 mile (400 m) or more long and only 30–40 feet (9–12 m) wide. Near Detroit, the ribbon farms were about 250 feet (75 m) wide and up to 3 miles (5 km) long. In Texas, lots could be as small as 10 acres (4 ha) in area, or as large as 5 by 20 miles (8 by 32 km).

Farmers of ribbon farms typically, although not universally, built houses on the farm along the river such that the houses on a series of ribbon farms were located near each other.

== Advantages ==
In areas where rivers provided the main form of transportation, the ribbon farm layout gave multiple landowners access to the waterway. In addition, the long lots increased variation in soil and drainage within one lot, and facilitated plowing by minimizing the number of times oxen teams needed to be turned. Where farmers lived on their lots (rather than in a central village), the ribbon farm fostered communication and socialization, with houses clustered at the ends of the lots. The ribbon farm also strikes an economic balance, where houses are relatively close together and can be easily and economically accessed, yet the farmers need not spend excessive travel time to reach their fields some distance from a central village. Finally, in those places in the New World where ribbon farms were platted, the division of land into long rectangles was relatively easy to survey and establish boundaries.

== Disadvantage ==
One disadvantage was that the agricultural land of a single farmer was awkwardly spread out, often over two or more linear miles, necessitating a long travel time to reach rear parts of the lot. However, this disadvantage was generally no more than would have been experienced by peasant farmers living in a central village and walking to their fields.

== See also ==
- Open field system
- Seigneurial system of New France
- Strip farming
- Strip farming in Norway
- Linear settlement
